= TVXQ singles discography =

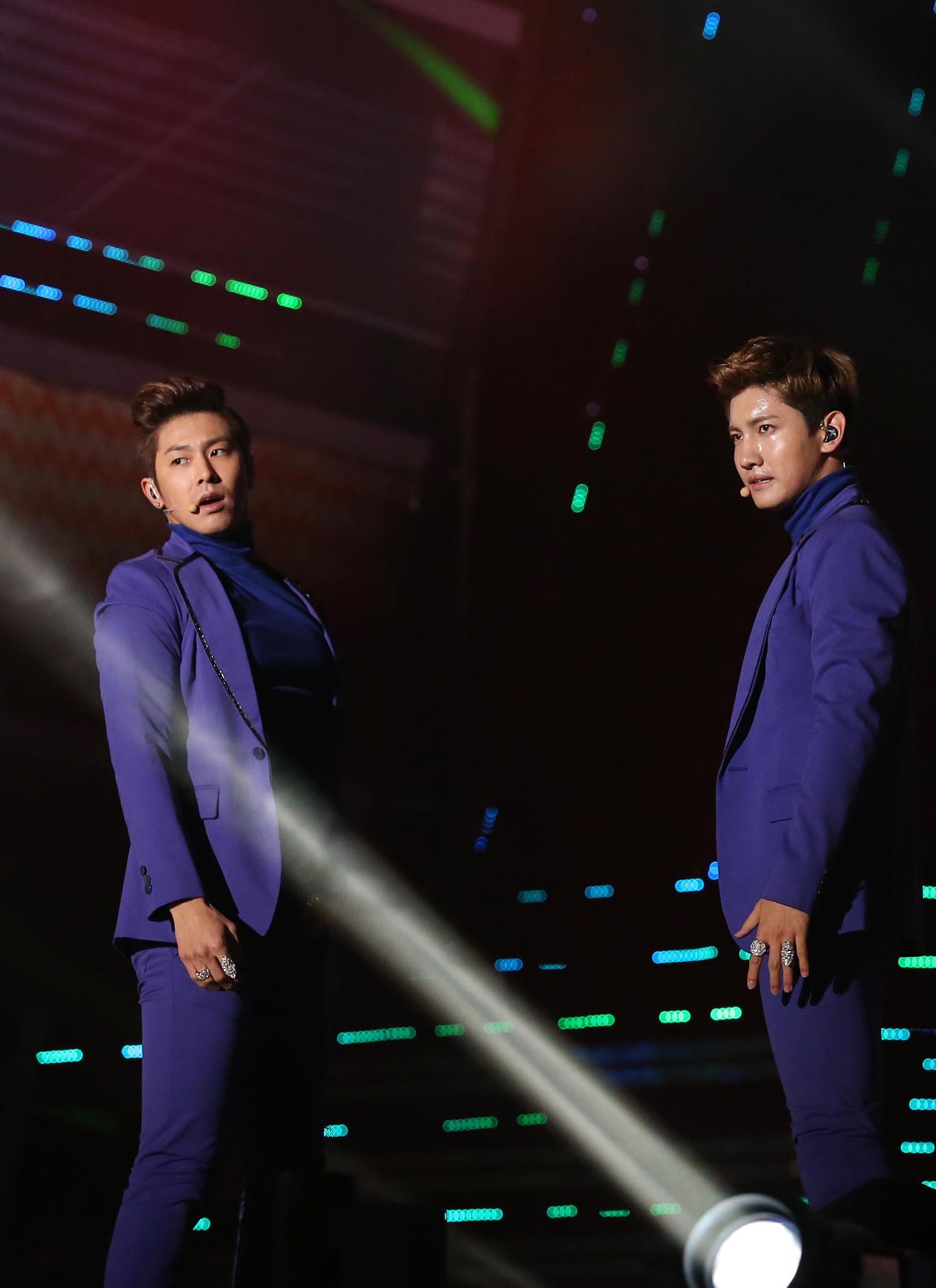
- TVXQ performing during the K-Pop World Festival, 2012
- Singles: 74
- Featured appearances: 3
- Soundtrack appearances: 27

South Korean pop group TVXQ, known as Tohoshinki (東方神起, Tōhōshinki) in Japanese releases, have released 74 singles (including 1 as a co-featuring artist), 3 featured appearances, and 27 soundtrack appearances. The group signed with S.M. Entertainment in 2003 and released their debut single "Hug" in January 2004, peaking at number four on the Monthly Albums Chart of the Music Industry Association of Korea (MIAK). Their following single "The Way U Are", released in June 2004, entered the MIAK Monthly Albums Chart at number one.

In late 2004, TVXQ signed with Japan's Avex Group to launch their Japanese music career. They first issued the English version of "Hug" in November 2004, which was then followed by the release of their debut Japanese single "Stay with Me Tonight" in April 2005, peaking at number thirty-seven on the Oricon Singles Chart. They achieved their first top-three single in Japan the following year with "Miss You / 'O'-Sei.Han.Gō.", and in 2008, they scored their first number-one Japanese single with "Purple Line". Its accompanying studio album T spawned six top-five singles on the Oricon.

In September 2008, TVXQ released their fourth Korean studio album Mirotic. The album's title single became one of TVXQ's biggest worldwide hits – it topped digital charts across most major Asian music markets, and became a signature song for the Hallyu. The group's fourth Japanese studio album The Secret Code, released in March 2009, repeated Mirotic's success, spawning four number-one singles on the Oricon. The single "Dōshite Kimi o Suki ni Natte Shimattandarō?" (2008) was the album's best-selling single, receiving a gold certification from the Recording Industry Association of Japan (RIAJ) after only one week of release. It went on to receive two platinum certifications in digital downloads in 2014.

The singles following "Survivor" (2009) cemented TVXQ's commercial success in Japan. The group scored their best-selling hit with "Share the World", receiving three platinum certifications in digital downloads from the RIAJ. The single, released in April 2009, was part of the soundtrack for the anime, One Piece. In 2010, TVXQ released their first platinum-certified singles "Break Out!" and "Toki o Tomete". The latter was TVXQ's last single to feature members Jaejoong, Yoochun, and Junsu.

TVXQ restarted their career as a duo with members Yunho and Changmin in January 2011. Their first single "Keep Your Head Down" debuted at number five on South Korea's Gaon Singles Chart and number one on Japan's Oricon, receiving a platinum certification from the RIAJ one week after release. "Keep Your Head Down" is one of TVXQ's biggest hits in Japan; it topped music charts across the country, earning a platinum certification in digital downloads. All of the duo's singles released after "Keep Your Head Down" have charted within the top three. With a total of thirteen number-one singles recorded on the Oricon, TVXQ is highest-ranking foreign music act in Japan. They have since sold more than 4.2 million physical singles there, making them the best-selling international artist of all-time in CD singles.

== Singles ==
=== Korean singles ===
List of Korean singles released by TVXQ
Title	Year	Peak chart positions				Sales	Album
Title	Year	KOR^{[A]}	KOR Hot^{[B]}	JPN	US World	Sales	Album
"Hug"	2004	12 (Note: Released in 2004, "Hug" peaked at number four on the MIAK charts for the month of January 2004. It entered the Gaon Album Chart in 2014 and peaked at number 12 for the week of January 12–18, 2014.)	—	77	—	KOR: 194,972 (phy.); JPN: 4,710 (phy.)	Tri-Angle
"The Way U Are"	2004	68 (Note: Released in 2004, "The Way U Are" peaked at number two on the MIAK charts for the month of July 2004. It entered the Gaon Album Chart in 2010 and peaked at number 68 for the week of March 7–13, 2010.)	—	—	—	KOR: 239,807 (phy.)	Tri-Angle
"I Believe" (믿어요)	2004	—	—	—	—		Tri-Angle
"Tri-Angle" (featuring BoA and the TRAX)	2004	—	—	—	—		Tri-Angle
"Magic Castle"	2004	—	—	—	—		The Christmas Gift from TVXQ
"Hi Ya Ya Yeoreumnal"	2005	45 (Note: Released in 2005, "Hi Ya Ya Summer Day" entered the Gaon Album Chart in 2010 and peaked at number 45 for the week of February 28 to March 6, 2010.)	—	—	—	KOR: 68,537 (phy.)	Non-album single
"Rising Sun"	2005	—	—	—	—		Rising Sun
"Tonight"	2005	—	—	—	—		Rising Sun
"Show Me Your Love" (with Super Junior)	2005	28 (Note: Released in 2005, "Show Me Your Love" peaked at number one on the MIAK charts for the month of December 2005. It entered the Gaon Album Chart in 2010 and peaked at number 28 for the week of February 21–27, 2010.)	—	—	—	KOR: 56,141 (phy.)	Non-album singles
"Dong Bang Tuhon"	2006	93 (Note: "Fighting Spirit of the East" was released in 2006 to support the South Korean football team at the 2006 FIFA World Cup. It entered the Gaon Album Chart in 2010 and peaked at number 93 for the week of January 10–16, 2010.)	—	—	—	KOR: 25,524 (phy.)	Non-album singles
"'O'-Jung.Ban.Hap."	2006	—	—	—	—		"O"-Jung.Ban.Hap.
"Balloons"	2006	—	—	—	—		"O"-Jung.Ban.Hap.
"Mirotic"	2008	—	—	—	—	KOR: 4,173,225	Mirotic
"Wrong Number"	2008	—	—	—	—		Mirotic
"Keep Your Head Down"	2011	5	—	—	—	KOR: 1,391,468	Keep Your Head Down
"Before U Go"	2011	15	—	—	—	KOR: 489,503	Before U Go
"Catch Me"	2012	16	25	—	7	KOR: 594,124	Catch Me
"Humanoids"	2012	32	—	—	8	KOR: 157,915	Humanoids
"Something"	2014	4	7	—	5	KOR: 564,880	Tense
"Spellbound"	2014	27	52	—	15	KOR: 136,338	Spellbound
"The Chance of Love"	2018	30	—	—	—		New Chapter #1: The Chance of Love
"Truth"	2018	—	—	—	—		New Chapter #2: The Truth of Love
"Rebel"	2023	—	—	—	—		20&2
"—" denotes items which were not released in that country or failed to chart.

=== Japanese singles ===
List of Japanese singles released by TVXQ
Title	Year	Peak chart positions					Sales	Certifications^{[D]}	Album
Title	Year	KOR^{[A]}	JPN	JPN Hot^{[C]}	JPN RIAJ^{[D]}	TW	Sales	Certifications^{[D]}	Album
"Stay with Me Tonight"	2005	—	37	—	—	—	JPN: 10,116		Heart, Mind and Soul
"Somebody to Love"	2005	—	14	—	—	—	JPN: 10,496		Heart, Mind and Soul
"My Destiny"	2005	—	16	—	—	—	JPN: 16,615		Heart, Mind and Soul
"Asu wa Kuru Kara"	2006	—	22	—	—	—	JPN: 11,484		Heart, Mind and Soul
"Rising Sun"	2006	—	22	—	—	—	JPN: 7,672		Heart, Mind and Soul
"Heart, Mind and Soul"	2006	—	22	—	—	—	JPN: 7,672		Heart, Mind and Soul
"Begin"	2006	—	15	—	—	—	JPN: 17,283		Five in the Black
"Sky"	2006	—	6	—	—	—	JPN: 26,890		Five in the Black
"Miss You"	2006	—	3	—	—	—	JPN: 29,226		Five in the Black
"O"-Sei.Han.Gō."	2006	—	3	—	—	—	JPN: 29,226		Five in the Black
"Step by Step"	2007	—	7	—	—	—	JPN: 29,144		Five in the Black
"Choosey Lover"	2007	—	9	—	—	—	JPN: 28,116		Five in the Black
"Lovin' You"	2007	—	2	—	—	—	JPN: 49,495	RIAJ: Gold (dig.)	T
"Summer Dream"	2007	—	2	—	—	—	JPN: 124,829	RIAJ: Gold (phy.)	T
"Song for You"	2007	—	2	—	—	—	JPN: 124,829	RIAJ: Gold (phy.)	T
"Love in the Ice"	2007	—	2	—	—	—	JPN: 124,829	RIAJ: Gold (phy.)	T
"Shine"	2007	—	2	—	—	—	JPN: 41,978		T
"Ride On"	2007	—	2	—	—	—	JPN: 41,978		T
"Forever Love"	2007	—	4	—	—	—	JPN: 50,812		T
"Together"	2007	—	3	—	—	—	JPN: 39,595		T
"Purple Line"	2008	72 (Note: Released in 2008, "Purple Line" entered the Gaon Album Chart in 2010 and peaked at number 72 for the week of March 28 to April 3, 2010.)	1	10	79	—	JPN: 47,303	RIAJ: Gold (dig.)	T
"Two Hearts"	2008	—	13	57	—	—	JPN: 27,116		The Secret Code
"Runaway"	2008	—	8	49	—	—	JPN: 32,983		The Secret Code
"If..."	2008	—	12	32	—	—	JPN: 32,939		The Secret Code
"Close to You"	2008	—	9	42	—	—	JPN: 21,037		The Secret Code
"Keyword"	2008	—	7	33	—	—	JPN: 29,122		The Secret Code
"Beautiful You"	2008	—	1	10	—	4	JPN: 121,771	RIAJ: Gold (phy.)	The Secret Code
"Sennen Koi Uta"	2008	—	1	—	—	4	JPN: 121,771	RIAJ: Gold (phy.)	The Secret Code
"Dōshite Kimi o Suki ni Natte Shimattandarō?"	2008	—	1	6	17	4	JPN: 120,890	RIAJ: Gold (phy.); 2× Platinum (dig.)	The Secret Code
"Mirotic"	2008	—	1	4	91	17	JPN: 100,000; JPN: 100,000 (dig.)	RIAJ: Gold (phy.); Gold (dig.)	The Secret Code
"Bolero"	2009	—	1	6	—	5	JPN: 110,717; JPN: 100,000 (dig.)	RIAJ: Gold (phy.); Gold (dig.)	The Secret Code
"Kiss the Baby Sky"	2009	—	1	—	—	5	JPN: 110,717	RIAJ: Gold (phy.)	The Secret Code
"Wasurenaide"	2009	—	1	—	—	5	JPN: 110,717	RIAJ: Gold (phy.)	The Secret Code
"Survivor"	2009	—	3	11	55	1	JPN: 100,313; JPN: 100,000 (dig.)	RIAJ: Gold (phy.); Gold (dig.)	The Secret Code
"Share the World"	2009	—	1	4	5	4	JPN: 180,826; JPN: 750,000 (dig.)	RIAJ: Gold (phy.); 3× Platinum (dig.)	Best Selection 2010
"We Are!"	2009	—	1	—	39	4	JPN: 180,826; JPN: 100,000 (dig.)	RIAJ: Gold (phy.); Gold (rt.)	Best Selection 2010
"Stand by U"	2009	65 (Note: Released in 2009, "Stand by U" entered the cumulative Gaon Album Chart in 2010 and peaked at number 65 for the week of March 7–13. 2010.)	2	2	7	—	JPN: 233,057; JPN: 250,000 (dig.)	RIAJ: Gold (phy.); Platinum (dig.)	Best Selection 2010
"Break Out!"	2010	3	1	1	7	4	JPN: 289,412; JPN: 100,000 (dig.)	RIAJ: Platinum (phy.); Gold (dig.)	Best Selection 2010
"Toki o Tomete"	2010	2	1	1	26	3	JPN: 250,448	RIAJ: Platinum (phy.)	Best Selection 2010
"Why? (Keep Your Head Down)"	2011	5	1	1	1	9	JPN: 286,056; JPN: 250,000 (dig.)	RIAJ: Platinum (phy.); Gold (rt.); Platinum (dig.)	Tone
"Superstar"	2011	8	2	1	11	13	JPN: 184,317	RIAJ: Gold (phy.)	Tone
"Winter Rose"	2011	5	2	2	23	10	JPN: 153,580	RIAJ: Gold (phy.)	Time
"Duet" (winter version)	2011	5	2	—	23	10	JPN: 153,580	RIAJ: Gold (phy.)	Tone
"Still"	2012	6	1	1	8	7	JPN: 160,791	RIAJ: Gold (phy.)	Time
"Android"	2012	16	1	2	4	14	JPN: 175,544	RIAJ: Gold (phy.)	Time
"Catch Me (If You Wanna)"	2013	7	1	1	—	—	JPN: 156,537; JPN: 100,000 (dig.)	RIAJ: Gold (phy.); Gold (dig.)	Time
"Ocean"	2013	10	2	2	—	14	JPN: 159,163	RIAJ: Gold (phy.)	Tree
"Scream"	2013	—	2	2	—	16	JPN: 145,628	RIAJ: Gold (phy.)	Tree
"Very Merry Xmas"	2013	—	2	3	—	19	JPN: 133,058	RIAJ: Gold (phy.)	Tree
"Hide & Seek"	2014	—	2	2	—	—	JPN: 119,291	RIAJ: Gold (phy.)	Tree
"Something"	2014	—	2	—	—	—	JPN: 119,291	RIAJ: Gold (phy.)	Tree
"Sweat"	2014	—	2	1	—	—	JPN: 140,300	RIAJ: Gold (phy.)	With
"Answer"	2014	—	2	—	—	—	JPN: 140,300	RIAJ: Gold (phy.)	With
"Time Works Wonders"	2014	—	2	1	—	—	JPN: 115,877	RIAJ: Gold (phy.)	With
"Sakuramichi"	2015	—	2	2	—	—	JPN: 158,131	RIAJ: Gold (phy.)	Fine Collection: Begin Again
"Reboot"	2017	—	2	3	—	—	JPN: 152,410	RIAJ: Gold (phy.)	Tomorrow
"Road"	2018	—	2	2	—	—	JPN: 92,924	RIAJ: Gold (phy.)	Tomorrow
"Jealous"	2018	—	1	3	—	—	JPN: 102,543	RIAJ: Gold (phy.)	XV
"Hot Hot Hot"	2019	—	2	4	—	—	JPN: 66,074		XV
"Mirrors"	2019	—	2	46	—	—	JPN: 66,074		XV
"Manazashi"	2020	—	3	6	—	—	JPN: 66,933		Non-album single
"Utsuroi"	2022	—	2	32	—	—	JPN: 27,003		Zone
"Parallel Parallel"	2023	—	3	35	—	—	JPN: 38,746		Zone
"Lime & Lemon"	2023	—	2	40	—	—	JPN: 35,915		Zone
"Sweet Surrender"	2024	—	—	—	—	—			Zone
"Dearest"	2024	—	—	—	—	—			Zone
"—" denotes items which were not released in that country or failed to chart.

== Promotional singles ==
=== Korean promotional singles ===
List of TVXQ Korean promotional singles
Title	Year	Peak chart positions	Album
Title	Year	KOR^{[A]}	Album
"Traveling"	2007	—	2007 Winter SMTown – Only Love
"Nothing Better"	2009	—	2009 Summer SMTown – We are Shining
"Athena"	2010	22	Keep Your Head Down
"Journey" (featuring Seohyun)	2011	111	Keep Your Head Down
"Rise as One" (Changmin solo)	2015	—	Rise as God
"Champagne" (Yunho solo)	2015	77	Rise as God
"Love Line"	2018	—	New Chapter No. 1: The Chance of Love
"Down"	2023	—	20&2
"—" denotes items which were not released in that country or failed to chart.

=== Japanese promotional singles ===
List of TVXQ Japanese promotional singles
Title	Year	Peak chart positions			Certifications^{[D]}	Album
Title	Year	JPN 100^{[C]}	JPN RIAJ^{[D]}	JPN Oricon	Certifications^{[D]}	Album
"Amaku Hateshinaku"	2009	—	8	—	RIAJ: Gold (dig.)	Best Selection 2010
"I Don't Know"	2011	—	44	—		Tone
"I Think U Know"	2011	—	—	—		Tone
"B.U.T (BE-AU-TY)"	2011	65	9	—	RIAJ: Gold (dig.)	Tone
"Back to Tomorrow"	2011	94	17	—		Tone
"Jumon -Mirotic-" (Live Tour 2012: Tone)	2012	—	—	—		Non-album singles
"Rising Sun" (Live Tour 2012: Tone)	2012	—	—	—		Non-album singles
"Summer Dream" (Live Tour 2012: Tone)	2012	—	—	—		Non-album singles
"I Know"	2012	—	—	—		Time
"In Our Time"	2013	—	—	—		Time
"Rat Tat Tat"	2013	—	—	—		Time
"Tree of Life"	2014	—	—	—		Tree
"Spinning"	2014	—	—	—		With
"Asu wa Kuru Kara (Tomorrow version)"	2018	—	—	—		Tomorrow
"Guilty"	2019	—	—	—		XV
"Small Talk"	2020	96	—	13		Epitaph
"Epitaph (For the Future)"	2022	—	—	—		Epitaph
"—" denotes items which were not released in that country or failed to chart.

== Featured appearances ==
=== As featured artists ===
List of singles as featured artists, with selected chart positions and certifications, showing year released and album name
Title	Year	Peak positions	Sales	Certifications^{[D]}	Album
Title	Year	JPN Oricon	Sales	Certifications^{[D]}	Album
"Last Angel" (Kumi Koda featuring Tohoshinki)	2007	3	JPN: 91,620; JPN: 100,000 (rt.)	RIAJ: Gold (phy.); Gold (rt.)	Kingdom
"Just the Two of Us!" (ravex featuring Tohoshinki)	2009	—			Trax
"Survival Dance (No No Cry More)" (TRF featuring Tohoshinki)	2013	—			TRF Tribute Album Best
"—" denotes items which were not released in that country or failed to chart.

=== As SM Town ===
List of featured appearances as SM Town
Title	Year	Album
"Hot Mail" (as SM Town)	2004	2004 Summer Vacation in SMTown.com
"Drive"	2004	2004 Summer Vacation in SMTown.com
"Through the Forest"	2004	2004 Summer Vacation in SMTown.com
"Red Sun" (as SM Town)	2006	2006 Summer SMTown
"Oasis"	2006	2006 Summer SMTown
"Snow Dream" (as SM Town)	2006	2006 Winter SMTown – Snow Dream
"When We'll Be Together"	2006	2006 Winter SMTown – Snow Dream
"Let's Go On a Trip" (as SM Town)	2007	2007 Summer SMTown – Fragile
"White Summer Christmas"	2007	2007 Summer SMTown – Fragile
"Only Love" (as SM Town)	2007	2007 Winter SMTown – Only Love
"Evergreen"	2007	2007 Winter SMTown – Only Love
"Yeohaenggi"	2007	2007 Winter SMTown – Only Love
"Seaside (Boom Boom)" (with Super Junior and SHINee)	2009	2009 Summer SMTown – We Are Shining
"Nothing Better"	2009	2009 Summer SMTown – We Are Shining
"Sleigh Ride"	2011	Winter: The Warmest Gift
"Dear My Family" (as SM Town)	2012	I AM. – Original Film Soundtrack
"Magical" (with Super Junior)	2021	2021 Winter SM Town: SMCU Express
"Dinner"	2021	2021 Winter SM Town: SMCU Express
"Hope from Kwangya" (as SM Town)	2021	2021 Winter SM Town: SMCU Express
"Psycho"	2025	2025 SM Town: The Culture, the Future

== Soundtrack appearances ==
=== Korean soundtrack appearances ===
Song	Year	Film and/or television drama series
"Free Your Mind" (Opening theme)	2006	Featured in Origami Warriors
"Love Is All I Need" (Ending theme)	2006	Featured in Origami Warriors
"Greeting"	2006	A Millionaire's First Love – Original Soundtrack
"Holding Back the Tears"	2006	Vacation – Original Soundtrack
"Beautiful Thing" (Harmonica version)	2006	Vacation – Original Soundtrack
"Remember"	2007	Prince Hours – Original Soundtrack
"Harudal"	2007	Air City – Original Soundtrack
"All in Vain"	2007	Air City – Original Soundtrack
"Rising Sun"	2009	Featured in Fast & Furious
"Athena"	2010	Athena: Goddess of War – Original Soundtrack
"Journey"	2011	Paradise Ranch – Original Soundtrack

=== Japanese soundtrack appearances ===
Song	Year	Film and/or television drama series
"I'll Be There" (Japanese version)	2007	Featured in Genghis Khan: To the Ends of the Earth and Sea
"A Whole New World"	2007	Disneymania presents Pop Parade Japan
"Sennen Koi Uta"	2007	The Legend – Original Soundtrack
"Last Angel"	2007	Resident Evil: Extinction – Original Soundtrack
"Bolero"	2009	Subaru – Original Soundtrack
"The Way U Are" (Japanese version)	2009	Subaru – Original Soundtrack
"Asu wa Kuru Kara" (17th ending theme)	2010	One Piece Memorial Album
"We Are!" (10th opening)	2010	One Piece Memorial Album
"Share the World" (11th opening)	2010	One Piece Memorial Album
"Break Out!" (Opening theme)	2010	Suzusato High School Calligraphy Club – Original Soundtrack
"With All My Heart ~Kimi ga Odoru, Natsu~"	2010	The Summer You Danced – Original Soundtrack
"Why? (Keep Your Head Down)" (Opening theme)	2011	My Beautiful Neighbor – Original Soundtrack
"One More Thing" (Opening theme)	2012	Featured in Let M: Watashi ga Anata wo Aisuru Riyuu
"Scream"	2013	Theme for Sadako 3D 2 Ranked #5 in the Orion Annual Ranking for Movie Tie-Up Singles
"Answer" (Opening theme)	2013	Featured in Hard Nut
"Hide & Seek" (Opening theme)	2014	Featured in Team Batista 4
"I Love You" (Opening theme)	2014	Featured in Kykei no Koya
"Sakuramichi" (Opening theme)	2015	Featured in Hanayome Noren
"Reboot" (Opening theme)	2017	Featured in School Counselor
"Daisuki Datta"	2018	Theme for Yo-kai Watch: Forever Friends
"Mirrors" (Opening theme)	2019	Featured in Sign

=== English soundtrack appearances ===
Song	Year	Film and/or television drama series
"Runnin on Empty"	2014	Make Your Move (Original Motion Picture Soundtrack)

== Other charted songs ==
=== Other charted Korean songs ===
List of charted Korean non-single songs
Title	Year	Peak chart positions	Album
Title	Year	KOR^{[A]}	Album
"How Can I"	2011	81	Keep Your Head Down
"Maximum	2011	14	Keep Your Head Down
"Crazy" (featuring Jay)	2011	112	Keep Your Head Down
"Rumor"	2011	108	Keep Your Head Down
"Our Game"	2011	132	Keep Your Head Down
"She"	2011	115	Keep Your Head Down
"Sleigh Ride"	2011	173	2011 Winter SMTown – The Warmest Gift
"Viva"	2012	113	Catch Me
"Destiny"	2012	96	Catch Me
"Like a Soap"	2012	107	Catch Me
"I Don't Know" (Korean version)	2012	118	Catch Me
"Dream"	2012	115	Catch Me
"How Are You"	2012	87	Catch Me
"Getaway"	2012	126	Catch Me
"I Swear"	2012	112	Catch Me
"Gorgeous"	2012	129	Catch Me
"Good Night"	2012	122	Catch Me
"Ten (10 Years)"	2014	70	Tense
"Your Man"	2014	68	Tense
"Moonlight Fantasy"	2014	67	Tense
"Beside"	2014	79	Tense
"Double Trouble"	2014	105	Tense
"Off-Road"	2014	89	Tense
"Smoky Heart"	2014	96	Tense
"Love Again"	2014	93	Tense
"Steppin'"	2014	90	Tense
"Rise..."	2014	100	Tense
"Always with You"	2014	75	Tense

=== Other charted Japanese songs ===
List of charted Japanese non-single songs
Title	Year	Peak chart positions	Album
Title	Year	JPN RIAJ^{[D]}	Album
"Tea for Two"	2009	89	Single B-Side Collection
"A Whole New World" (DJ Kaori Remix)	2009	82	Disney / Mellow Disney ～R & B Revisited～
"With All My Heart (君が踊る、夏)"	2010	11	Best Selection 2010
"Maximum"	2011	31	Tone
"Duet"	2011	35	Tone
"Shiawase Iro no Hana"	2011	97	Tone
"Easy Mind"	2011	83	Tone
"One More Thing"	2012	38	Time
"Blink"	2012	49	Time

== See also ==
- TVXQ albums discography
- TVXQ videography
- List of songs recorded by TVXQ
- List of awards and nominations received by TVXQ

== Notes ==
- A Prior to the establishment of the Gaon Music Chart in 2010, South Korea's music charts were supplied by the Music Industry Association of Korea (MIAK), which stopped compiling data in 2008. There are no known cumulative chart records for digital singles prior to 2010. The Gaon Music Chart was rebranded to the Circle Chart in 2022.
- B The first issue date of the Billboard K-Pop Hot 100 was on August 25, 2011. The chart was discontinued after the May 17, 2014, issue date.
- C The first issue date of the Billboard Japan Hot 100 was on March 3, 2008.
- D The Recording Industry Association of Japan (RIAJ) supplies the music recording sales certification in Japan. Until July 27, 2012, Chaku-uta Full (cellphone downloads), Chaku-uta (ringtones) and regular PC Haishin (PC digital download) sales were charted separately by the RIAJ on the RIAJ Digital Track Chart. The chart was discontinued after July 27, 2012. On February 28, 2014, the Chaku-uta Full and PC categories were merged to create the Single Track (digital download) category.

Specific
