= List of awards and nominations received by TVXQ =

TVXQ awards and nominations
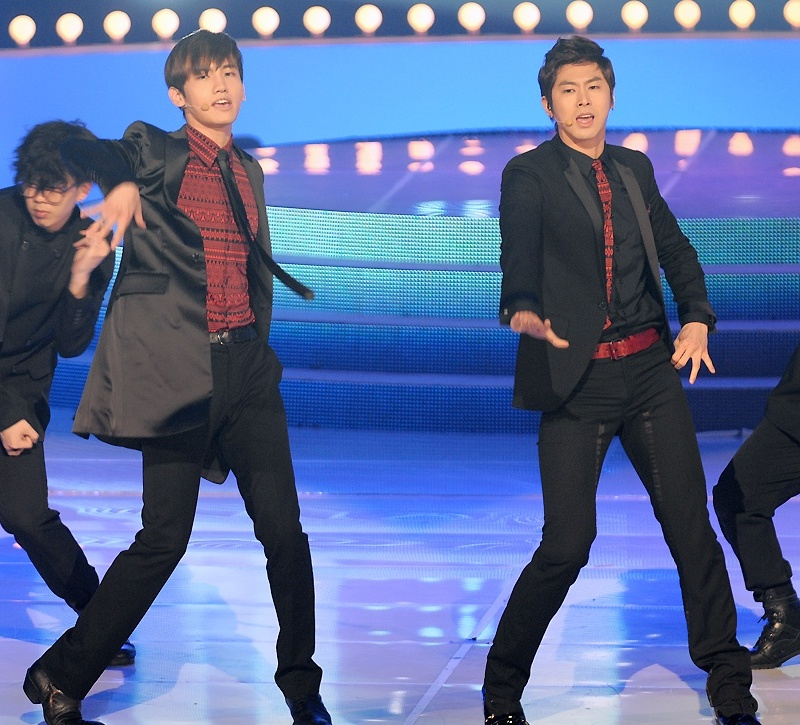
- TVXQ in May 2011
Awards and nominations
Award	Wins	Nominations
Asia Song Festival	1	1
Circle Chart Music	3	3
Golden Disc	6	9
Japan Gold Disc	16	16
MAMA	12	33
Melon Music	2	4
MTV Korea	1	1
MTV Japan	3	4
Seoul Music	8	15
World Music	0	9
Asia Model Festival Awards	1	1
Best Hits Japan	3	3
Billboard Japan Music Awards	1	2
Japan Internet Music Awards	1	1
Japan Record Awards	3	6
KBS Music Awards	2	2
Korea Broadcasting Prizes	1	1
Korean Entertainment Awards	2	2
MBC Entertainment Awards	1	1
MBC Gayo Daejejeon	2	2
SBS Gayo Daejeon	5	7
Thailand Channel [V] MV Awards	3	3
Thailand Asia SEED Awards	2	2
Thailand Virgin Hitz Awards	1	1

Totals (Note: Certain award groups do not simply award one winner. They acknowledge several different recipients, have runners-up, and have third place. Since this is a specific recognition and is different from losing an award, runner-up mentions are considered wins in this award tally. For simplification and to avoid errors, each award in this list has been presumed to have had a prior nomination.)
- Wins: 82
- Nominations: 132

This is a list of awards and nominations received by TVXQ, a South Korean pop group produced by SM Entertainment. TVXQ have received numerous awards and nominations for their contributions to the music industries in both South Korea as well as Japan—where they are known as Tohoshinki (東方神起).

== Awards and nominations ==
Name of award ceremony, year awarded, category, nominated work, and result
Award ceremony	Year	Category	Nominee / work	Result	Ref.
Asia Model Awards	2013	Asia Star Award	TVXQ	Won	
Asia Song Festival	2008	Asia's Top Singer Award	TVXQ	Won	
Best Hits Japan	2007	Gold Artist Award	Tohoshinki	Won	
Best Hits Japan	2008	Gold Artist Award	Tohoshinki	Won	
Best Hits Japan	2009	Gold Artist Award	Tohoshinki	Won	
Billboard Japan Music Awards	2012	Top Pop Artist	Tone	Won	
Billboard Japan Music Awards	2013	Top Pop Artist	Time	Nominated	
Gaon Chart K-Pop Awards	2012	Album of the Year – 1st Quarter	Keep Your Head Down	Won	
Gaon Chart K-Pop Awards	2013	Album of the Year – 4th Quarter	Catch Me	Won	
Gaon Chart K-Pop Awards	2014	Album of the Year – 1st Quarter	Tense	Won	
Golden Disc Awards	2004	New Artist Award	TVXQ	Won	
Golden Disc Awards	2006	Main Album Award (Disk Bonsang)	"O"-Jung.Ban.Hap.	Won	
Golden Disc Awards	2006	Grand Prize in Album Releasing (Disk Daesang)	"O"-Jung.Ban.Hap.	Won	
Golden Disc Awards	2008	Grand Prize in Album Releasing (Disk Daesang)	Mirotic	Won	
Golden Disc Awards	2008	Main Album Award (Disk Bonsang)	Mirotic	Won	
Golden Disc Awards	2008	Yepp Popularity Award	Mirotic	Won	
Golden Disc Awards	2013	The Most Popular K-pop Star	Catch Me	Nominated	
Golden Disc Awards	2013	Main Album Award (Disk Bonsang)	Catch Me	Nominated	
Golden Disc Awards	2015	Main Album Award (Disk Bonsang)	Catch Me	Nominated	
Japan Gold Disc Awards	2010	Best Music Videos (International)	All About TVXQ! scope="row" – Season 3	Won	
Japan Gold Disc Awards	2011	Best Top 5 Albums	Best Selection 2010	Won	
Japan Gold Disc Awards	2011	Best Music Videos	TOHOSHINKI Video Clip Collection	Won	
Japan Gold Disc Awards	2012	Best 3 Albums (Asia)	Tone	Won	
Japan Gold Disc Awards	2014	Best Asian Artist	Tohoshinki	Won	
Japan Gold Disc Awards	2014	Album of the Year (Asia)	Time	Won	
Japan Gold Disc Awards	2014	Best 3 Albums (Asia)	Time	Won	
Japan Gold Disc Awards	2014	Song of the Year by Download (Asia)	"Catch Me -If you wanna-"	Won	
Japan Gold Disc Awards	2014	Best Music Videos	Tohoshinki LIVE TOUR 2013 ~TIME~	Won	
Japan Gold Disc Awards	2015	Best Asian Artist	Tohoshinki	Won	
Japan Gold Disc Awards	2015	Album of the Year (Asia)	Tree	Won	
Japan Gold Disc Awards	2015	Best 3 Albums (Asia)	Tree	Won	
Japan Gold Disc Awards	2015	Best 3 Albums (Asia)	With	Won	
Japan Gold Disc Awards	2015	Best Music Videos	Tohoshinki LIVE TOUR 2014 ~TREE~	Won	
Japan Gold Disc Awards	2016	Best Asian Artist	Tohoshinki	Won	
Japan Gold Disc Awards	2016	Best Music Video	Tohoshinki LIVE TOUR 2015 WITH	Won	
Japan Internet Music Festival	2011	Entertainment TV Award	Tohoshinki	Won	
Japan Record Awards	2008	Grand Prix	"Dōshite Kimi o Suki ni Natte Shimattandarō?"	Nominated	
Japan Record Awards	2008	Excellent Work Award	"Dōshite Kimi o Suki ni Natte Shimattandarō?"	Won	
Japan Record Awards	2009	Grand Prix	"Stand by U"	Nominated	
Japan Record Awards	2009	Excellent Work Award	"Stand by U"	Won	
Japan Record Awards	2011	Grand Prix	"Why? (Keep Your Head Down)"	Nominated	
Japan Record Awards	2011	Excellent Work Award	"Why? (Keep Your Head Down)"	Won	
KBS Music Awards	2004	Artist of the Year	TVXQ	Won	
KBS Music Awards	2005	Artist of the Year	TVXQ	Won	
Korea Broadcasting Prizes	2011	Best Singer	Keep Your Head Down	Won	
Korean Entertainment Awards	2007	Overseas Popularity Award	TVXQ	Won	
Korean Entertainment Awards	2008	Most Popular Group	TVXQ	Won	
Korea Entertainment Producers Association	2009	Culture Sports Tourism Recognition Award	TVXQ	Won	
Korea Grand Music Awards	2024	K-Pop Legendary Artist	TVXQ	Won	
MAMA Awards	2004	Best New Group Video	"Hug"	Won	
MAMA Awards	2004	Best Dance Video	"Hug"	Nominated	
MAMA Awards	2005	Most Popular Music Video	"Rising Sun"	Won	
MAMA Awards	2005	Best Male Group	"Rising Sun"	Nominated	
MAMA Awards	2005	Best Dance Performance	"Rising Sun"	Nominated	
MAMA Awards	2005	M.net Plus Mobile Popularity Award	"Rising Sun"	Won	
MAMA Awards	2006	Album of the Year	"O"-Jung.Ban.Hap.	Nominated	
MAMA Awards	2006	Artist of the Year	TVXQ	Won	
MAMA Awards	2006	Song of the Year	"'O'-Jung.Ban.Hap."	Nominated	
MAMA Awards	2006	Best Group	"'O'-Jung.Ban.Hap."	Won	
MAMA Awards	2006	Best Dance Performance	"'O'-Jung.Ban.Hap."	Nominated	
MAMA Awards	2006	M.net Choice	TVXQ	Won	
MAMA Awards	2006	M.net Plus Mobile Popularity Award	TVXQ	Won	
MAMA Awards	2008	Album of the Year	Mirotic	Won	
MAMA Awards	2008	Artist of the Year	TVXQ	Nominated	
MAMA Awards	2008	Song of the Year	"Mirotic"	Nominated	
MAMA Awards	2008	Best Male Group	"Mirotic"	Nominated	
MAMA Awards	2008	Best Dance	"Mirotic"	Nominated	
MAMA Awards	2008	Auction Netizen's Choice Award	TVXQ	Won	
MAMA Awards	2008	Oversees Viewers Award	TVXQ	Won	
MAMA Awards	2009	Best Asia Star	TVXQ	Won	
MAMA Awards	2011	Album of the Year	Keep Your Head Down	Nominated	
MAMA Awards	2011	Artist of the Year	TVXQ	Nominated	
MAMA Awards	2011	Song of the Year	"Keep Your Head Down"	Nominated	
MAMA Awards	2011	Best Male Group	"Keep Your Head Down"	Nominated	
MAMA Awards	2011	Best Dance Performance – Male Group	"Keep Your Head Down"	Nominated	
MAMA Awards	2012	Album of the Year	Catch Me	Nominated	
MAMA Awards	2012	Artist of the Year	TVXQ	Nominated	
MAMA Awards	2012	Best Male Group	"Catch Me"	Nominated	
MAMA Awards	2012	Best Global Group – Male	"Catch Me"	Nominated	
MAMA Awards	2014	Song of the Year	"Something"	Nominated	
MAMA Awards	2014	Best Dance Performance – Male Group	"Something"	Nominated	
MAMA Awards	2023	Inspiring Achievement Award	TVXQ	Won	
MBC Entertainment Awards	2011	K-pop Concert	TVXQ	Won	
MBC Gayo Daejejeon	2004	Top Ten Singers Award	Tri-Angle	Won	
MBC Gayo Daejejeon	2004	Best New Artist	Tri-Angle	Won	
Melon Music Awards	2009	Star Award	TVXQ	Won	
Melon Music Awards	2009	Mania Award	Mirotic	Won	
Melon Music Awards	2012	Global Artist – Global Star Award	TVXQ	Nominated	
Melon Music Awards	2014	Netizen Popularity Award	"Something"	Nominated	
MTV Best of the Best Awards	2011	Artist of the Year	Keep Your Head Down	Won	
MTV Video Music Awards Japan	2007	Best Buzz – South Korea	"'O'-Jung.Ban.Hap."	Won	
MTV Video Music Awards Japan	2008	Best Collaboration Video	"Last Angel"	Won	
MTV Video Music Awards Japan	2010	Best Group Video	"Share the World"	Won	
MTV Video Music Awards Japan	2013	Best Group Video	"Catch Me -If you wanna-"	Nominated	
SBS Gayo Daejeon	2004	Main Prize (Bonsang)	Tri-Angle	Won	
SBS Gayo Daejeon	2004	Grand Prize (Daesang)	Tri-Angle	Nominated	
SBS Gayo Daejeon	2005	Grand Prize (Daesang)	Rising Sun	Nominated	
SBS Gayo Daejeon	2005	Main Prize (Bonsang)	Rising Sun	Won	
SBS Gayo Daejeon	2005	Popularity Award	TVXQ	Won	
SBS Gayo Daejeon	2006	Grand Prize (Daesang)	"O"-Jung.Ban.Hap.	Won	
SBS Gayo Daejeon	2006	Main Prize (Bonsang)	"O"-Jung.Ban.Hap.	Won	
Seoul Music Awards	2004	Grand Prize (Daesang)	TVXQ	Nominated	
Seoul Music Awards	2004	Main Prize (Bonsang)	TVXQ	Won	
Seoul Music Awards	2004	Newcomer Award	TVXQ	Won	
Seoul Music Awards	2004	Popularity Award	TVXQ	Won	
Seoul Music Awards	2006	Grand Prize (Daesang)	TVXQ	Won	
Seoul Music Awards	2006	Main Prize (Bonsang)	TVXQ	Won	
Seoul Music Awards	2006	Popularity Award	TVXQ	Won	
Seoul Music Awards	2009	Grand Prize (Daesang)	TVXQ	Nominated	
Seoul Music Awards	2009	Main Prize (Bonsang)	TVXQ	Won	
Seoul Music Awards	2009	Popular Mobile Award	TVXQ	Won	
Seoul Music Awards	2012	Main Prize (Bonsang)	TVXQ	Nominated	
Seoul Music Awards	2013	Main Prize (Bonsang)	TVXQ	Nominated	
Seoul Music Awards	2015	Main Prize (Bonsang)	TVXQ	Nominated	
Seoul Music Awards	2015	Popularity Award	TVXQ	Nominated	
Seoul Music Awards	2015	Hallyu Award	TVXQ	Nominated	
Thailand Channel [V] MV Awards	2006	Popular Music Video	"Rising Sun"	Won	
Thailand Channel [V] MV Awards	2006	Popular Asian Artist	TVXQ	Won	
Thailand Channel [V] MV Awards	2009	Popular Asian Artist	TVXQ	Won	
Thailand Asia SEED Awards	2007	Best Asian Singer Award	TVXQ	Won	
Thailand Asia SEED Awards	2009	Best Asian Artist of the Year	TVXQ	Won	
Thailand Virgin Hitz Awards	2006	Popular Vote Asia Artist	TVXQ	Won	
World Music Awards	2014	World's Best Group	Tohoshinki	Nominated	
World Music Awards	2014	World's Best Live Act	Tohoshinki	Nominated	
World Music Awards	2014	World's Best Song	"Very Merry Xmas"	Nominated	
World Music Awards	2014	World's Best Video	"Very Merry Xmas"	Nominated	
World Music Awards	2014	World's Best Song	"Something"	Nominated	
World Music Awards	2014	World's Best Video	"Something"	Nominated	
World Music Awards	2014	World's Best Album	Time	Nominated	
World Music Awards	2014	World's Best Album	Tense	Nominated	
World Music Awards	2014	World's Best Album	Tree	Nominated	

== Other recognitions ==
Years	Awards
2004	Seoul Dental Association – 2004 Award for Celebrities with Healthy Teeth; Seoul Foreign Correspondents' Club – Foreign Press Public Relations Award for Tri-Angle

== Listicles ==
Name of publisher, year listed, name of listicle, and placement
Publisher	Year	Listicle	Ranking	Ref.
The Dong-a Ilbo	2016	Best Male Artists According to Experts	2nd	
Forbes	2012	Korea Power Celebrity	15th	
Forbes	2013	Korea Power Celebrity	23rd	
Forbes	2014	Korea Power Celebrity	7th	
Forbes	2015	Korea Power Celebrity	37th	
Golden Disc Awards	2025	Golden Disc Powerhouse 40	Placed	
IZM	2025	The 25 Greatest Musicians of the first 25 Years of the 21st Century	Placed	
Korea Federation of Copyright Societies (Note: The Korea Federation of Copyright Societies is an association that consists of 10 organizations, including the Korea Music Copyright Association (KOMCA), the Korean Music Performers Association, the Korean Broadcasting Writers Association, and the Korea Press Foundation, and has a total of 300,000 members.)	2023	Korea World Music Culture Hall of Fame ("Mirotic")	Inducted	
LiveAbout	2018	Top 30 Boy Bands of All Time	Placed	

== See also ==
- TVXQ albums discography
- TVXQ singles discography
- TVXQ videography
- List of songs recorded by TVXQ
