= TVXQ videography =

South Korean boy band videography

TVXQ video discography
- Music videos: 111
- Concert tour videos: 20
- Documentaries: 11
- Video compilations: 1
- Photo albums: 8
- Storybooks: 6

The videography of South Korean pop group TVXQ, known as Tohoshinki in Japan, consists of 111 music videos, 20 concert tour videos, 11 documentary DVDs, one music video compilation, eight photo albums, and six storybooks. TVXQ originally debuted as a five-piece boy band under S.M. Entertainment in December 2003. In 2004, the band signed with Japan's Avex sub-label Rhythm Zone and released their debut Japanese single, "Stay with Me Tonight" in April 2005. In July 2009, three of the members – later known as JYJ – left the group's Korean agency S.M. Entertainment, and TVXQ returned as a duo act with remaining members U-Know Yunho and Max Changmin in 2011.

== Music videos ==
=== 2000s ===
Year	Title	Note	Album	Original language	Notes
2004	"Hug"	^{3}	Tri-Angle	Korean	
2004	"My Little Princess"	^{4}	Tri-Angle	Korean	
2004	"The Way U Are"		Tri-Angle	Korean	
2004	"Hotmail"		2004 Summer Vacation in SMTown.com	Korean	with SM Town
2004	"Whatever They Say" (A cappella version)		Tri-Angle	Korean	
2004	"Believe"		Tri-Angle	Korean	
2004	"Thanks To"		Tri-Angle	Korean	
2004	"Tri-Angle" (featuring BoA and the TRAX)		Tri-Angle	Korean	
2004	"Magic Castle"		The Christmas Gift from TVXQ	Korean	
2005	"Stay with Me Tonight"		Heart, Mind and Soul	Japanese	1st Japanese single
2005	"Hi Ya Ya Summer Day"			Korean	Special summer single
2005	"Somebody to Love"		Heart, Mind and Soul	Japanese	2nd Japanese single
2005	"Tonight"		Rising Sun	Korean	
2005	"Rising Sun"	^{1}	Rising Sun	Korean	A separate Korean music video was filmed for LG Mobile.
2005	"My Destiny"		Heart, Mind and Soul	Japanese	3rd Japanese single
2005	"Show Me Your Love" (with Super Junior)			Korean	Christmas single
2006	"Always There..."		Rising Sun	Korean	
2006	"Beautiful Life"	^{6}	Rising Sun	Korean	
2006	"Free Your Mind"	^{5}	Rising Sun	Korean	
2006	"Asu wa Kuru Kara"		Heart, Mind and Soul	Japanese	4th Japanese single
2006	"Fighting Spirit of the East"			Korean	Korea National Football Team Official Image Song
2006	"Red Sun"		2006 Summer SMTown	Korean	with SM Town
2006	"Begin"		Five in the Black	Japanese	6th Japanese single
2006	"Sky"		Five in the Black	Japanese	7th Japanese single
2006	"'O'-Jung.Ban.Hap."	^{1}	"O"-Jung.Ban.Hap.	Korean	
2006	"Miss You"		Five in the Black	Japanese	8th Japanese single
2006	"Balloons"		"O"-Jung.Ban.Hap.	Korean	
2006	"Snow Dream"		2006 Summer SMTown	Korean	with SM Town
2007	"Step by Step"		Five in the Black	Japanese	9th Japanese single
2007	"You're My Miracle"	^{5}	"O"-Jung.Ban.Hap.	Korean	
2007	"Choosey Lover"		Five in the Black	Japanese	10th Japanese single
2007	"Lovin' You"		T	Japanese	11th Japanese single
2007	"Let's Go On a Trip!"		2007 Summer SMTown - Fragile	Korean	with SM Town
2007	"Summer Dream"		T	Japanese	12th Japanese single
2007	"Shine"		T	Japanese	13th Japanese single
2007	"Last Angel" (with Kumi Koda)	^{7}	Kingdom	Japanese	
2007	"Forever Love"		T	Japanese	14th Japanese single
2007	"Holding Back the Tears"	^{7}	Vacation	Korean	
2007	"Only Love"		2007 Winter SMTown - Only Love	Korean	with SM Town
2007	"Together"		T	Japanese	15th Japanese single, and was released in two versions, including an animated Cinnamonroll version.
2008	"Purple Line"	^{2}	T	Korean / Japanese	16th Japanese single, Including Korean Version
2008	"Beautiful You"		The Secret Code	Japanese	22nd Japanese single
2008	"Dōshite Kimi o Suki ni Natte Shimattandarō?"		The Secret Code	Japanese	23rd Japanese single
2008	"Mirotic"	^{1} ^{8}	Mirotic	Korean	
2008	"Wrong Number"	^{8}	Mirotic	Korean	
2009	"Bolero"	^{7}	The Secret Code	Japanese	25th Japanese single
2009	"Survivor"		The Secret Code	Japanese	26th Japanese single
2009	"Kiss the Baby Sky"		The Secret Code	Japanese	25th Japanese single
2009	"Are You a Good Girl?"	^{5}	Mirotic	Korean	
2009	"Share the World"	^{7}	Best Selection 2010	Japanese	27th Japanese single
2009	"Stand by U		Best Selection 2010	Japanese	28th Japanese single
2009	"Picture of You"	^{6}	Mirotic	Korean	Last Korean music video with five members
2009	"Seaside (Boom Boom)"	^{5}	2009 Summer SMTown – We Are Shining	Korean	with SM Town

=== 2010s ===
Year	Title	Note	Album	Original language	Notes
2010	"Break Out!"		Best Selection 2010	Japanese	29th Japanese single
2010	"Toki o Tomete"		Best Selection 2010	Japanese	30th Japanese single, and the last music video with five members
2011	"Keep Your Head Down"	^{1} ^{8}	Keep Your Head Down	Korean	
2011	"Before U Go"	^{8}	Before U Go	Korean	Released as a regular music video and a short film
2011	"Superstar"	^{8}	Tone	Japanese	32nd Japanese single
2011	"B.U.T. (BE-AU-TY)"	^{8}	Tone	Japanese	
2011	"I Don't Know"	^{8}	Tone	Japanese	
2011	"Duet"		Time	Japanese	33rd Japanese single
2011	"Winter Rose"		Time	Japanese	33rd Japanese single
2011	"Santa U Are the One" (by Super Junior)		2011 Winter SMTown – The Warmest Gift	Korean	with SM Town
2012	"Still"		Time	Japanese	34th Japanese single
2012	"Dear My Family"		I AM. Original Soundtrack	Korean	with SM Town
2012	"Android"	^{8}	Time	Japanese	35th Japanese single
2012	"Shiawase Iro no Hana"	^{5}	Tone	Japanese	
2012	"Catch Me"	^{1} ^{8}	Catch Me	Korean	
2012	"Humanoids"	^{1} ^{8}	Humanoids	Korean	
2012	"I Know"		Time	Japanese	
2013	"In Our Time"	^{5}	Time	Japanese	
2013	"Ocean"	^{8}	Tree	Japanese	37th Japanese single
2013	"Scream"	^{7} ^{8}	Tree	Japanese	38th Japanese single
2013	"Very Merry Xmas"		Tree	Japanese	39th Japanese single
2014	"Something"	^{1} ^{8}	Tense	Korean	
2014	"Tree of Life"		Tree	Japanese	
2014	"White"		Fine Collection: Begin Again	Japanese	
2014	"Spellbound"	^{8}	Spellbound	Korean	
2014	"Sweat"	^{8}	With	Japanese	41st Japanese single
2014	"I Love You"	^{5}	Tree	Japanese	
2014	"Time Works Wonders"	^{4}	With	Japanese	42nd Japanese single
2014	"Chandelier"		With	Japanese	
2014	"Spinning"		With	Japanese	
2015	"Sakuramichi"		Fine Collection: Begin Again	Japanese	43rd Japanese single
2015	"Rise as One"		Rise as God	Korean	Max Changmin solo
2015	"Champagne"		Rise as God	Korean	U-Know Yunho solo
2015	"With Love"	^{5}	With	Japanese	
2017	"Reboot"		Tomorrow	Japanese	44th Japanese single
2017	"Begin ~Again Version~"		Tomorrow	Japanese	Remake of 6th Japanese single
2018	"The Chance of Love"		New Chapter #1: The Chance of Love	Korean	
2018	"Love Line"		New Chapter #1: The Chance of Love	Korean	
2018	"Road"		Tomorrow	Japanese	45th Japanese single
2018	"Asu wa Kuru Kara ~Tomorrow Version~"		Tomorrow	Japanese	Remake of 4th Japanese single
2019	"Jealous"		XV	Japanese	46th Japanese single
2018	"Truth"		New Chapter #2: The Truth of Love	Korean	
2019	"Hot Hot Hot"		XV	Japanese	47th Japanese single
2019	"Guilty"		XV	Japanese	
2019	"Hot Sauce"		XV	Japanese	

=== 2020s ===
Year	Title	Note	Album	Original language	Notes
2020	"Manazashi"			Japanese	48th Japanese single
2021	"Hope"			Korean	with SM Town
2022	"Hope from Kwangya"			Korean	with SM Town
2022	"Epitaph (For the Future)"		Epitaph	Japanese	
2022	"Utsuroi"			Japanese	49th Japanese single
2023	"Hope from Kwangya"			Korean	with SM Town
2023	"Parallel Parallel"	^{8}		Japanese	50th Japanese single
2023	"Lime & Lemon"			Japanese	51st Japanese single
2023	"Down"		20&2	Korean	
2023	"Rebel"	^{8}	20&2	Korean	

=== Notes ===
- ^{1} – A separate music video for the Japanese version was officially released.
- ^{2} – A separate music video for the Korean version was officially released.
- ^{3} – A separate music video for the English version was officially released.
- ^{4} – An alternate version of the music video was officially released.
- ^{5} – A music video featuring footage from a concert tour.
- ^{6} – A music video to promote a DVD release.
- ^{7} – A music video for a soundtrack.
- ^{8} – Separate dance version(s) was filmed.

== Video albums ==
=== Concert tour videos ===
Title	Album details	Peak chart positions		Sales
Title	Album details	KOR	JPN	Sales
Korean
The 1st Live Concert "Rising Sun"	Released: January 18, 2007; Label: SM Entertainment; Format: DVD	—	—	
The 2nd Asia Tour Concert "O"	Released: January 3, 2008; Label: SM Entertainment; Format: DVD	—	—	
The 3rd Asia Tour Concert "Mirotic"	Released: December 30, 2009; Label: SM Entertainment; Format: DVD	—	—	KOR: 12,576
The 4th World Tour "Catch Me" in Seoul	Released: August 14, 2014; Label: S.M. Entertainment; Format: DVD	—	—	KOR: 7,689; JPN: 5,230
Special Live Tour in Seoul "T1ST0RY"	Released: May 29, 2015 (DVD); August 31, 2015 (Blu-ray); Label: SM Entertainment; Format: DVD, Blu-ray	—	—	
TVXQ! Concert Circle #welcome	Released: March 27, 2019; Label: SM Entertainment; Format: DVD	—	—	
Japanese
1st Live Tour 2006 ~Heart, Mind and Soul~	Released: October 4, 2006; Label: Rhythm Zone; Format: VCD, DVD	—	—	JPN: 95,096
2nd Live Tour 2007 ~Five in the Black~	Released: September 26, 2007; Re-released: December 29, 2010; Label: Rhythm Zone; Format: VCD, DVD, Blu-ray	—	—	JPN: 163,856
3rd Live Tour 2008 ~T~	Released: August 6, 2008; Re-released: December 29, 2010; Label: Rhythm Zone; Format: VCD, DVD, Blu-ray	—	—	JPN: 204,127
4th Live Tour 2009 ~The Secret Code~ Final in Tokyo Dome	Released: September 30, 2009; Re-released: March 17, 2010; Label: Rhythm Zone; Format: DVD, Blu-ray	—	1	JPN: 315,203
Live Tour 2012 ~Tone~ Tohoshinki's Perfect Live Performance in Tokyo Dome	Released: July 25, 2012; Label: Avex Trax; Format: DVD, Blu-ray	—	1	JPN: 231,891
Live Tour 2013 ~Time~	Released: October 23, 2013; Label: Avex Trax; Format: DVD, Blu-ray	—	1	JPN: 184,552
Live Tour 2013 ~Time~ Final in Nissan Stadium	Released: December 18, 2013; Label: Avex Trax; Format: DVD, Blu-ray	—	1	JPN: 133,069
Live Tour 2014 ~Tree~	Released: August 27, 2014; Label: Avex Trax; Format: DVD, Blu-ray	—	1	JPN: 166,803
Live Tour 2015 ~With~	Released: August 19, 2015; Label: Avex Trax; Format: DVD, Blu-ray	—	1	JPN: 161,193
Live Tour 2017 ~Begin Again~	Released: March 28, 2018; Label: Avex Trax; Format: DVD, Blu-ray	—	1	JPN: 93,789
Live Tour 2017 ~Begin Again~ Special Edition in Nissan Stadium	Released: December 19, 2018; Label: Avex Trax; Format: DVD, Blu-ray	—	1	JPN: 70,000
Live Tour 2018 ~Tomorrow~	Released: April 8, 2019; Label: Avex Trax; Format: DVD, Blu-ray	—	1	
Live Tour 2019 ~XV~	Released: February 24, 2021; Label: Avex Trax; Format: DVD, Blu-ray	—	2	
Live Tour 2023 ~Classyc~	Release: November 1, 2023; Label: Avex Trax; Format: DVD, Blu-ray	—	2	
"—" denotes releases that did not chart or were not released in that region.

=== Documentaries ===
Title	Album details	Peak chart positions		Sales
Title	Album details	KOR	JPN	Sales
Korean
Rising Sun Showcase	Released: November 2, 2005; Label: S.M. Entertainment; Format: VCD	—	—	
All About TVXQ!	Release: February 27, 2006; Label: S.M. Entertainment; Format: DVD	—	—	JPN: 16,597
All About TVXQ! Season 2	Release: November 21, 2007; Label: S.M. Entertainment; Format: DVD	—	—	JPN: 13,148
All About TVXQ! Season 3	Released: August 14, 2009; Label: S.M. Entertainment; Format: DVD	—	—	KOR: 14,130; JPN: 79,000
Catch Me — Production Note	Release: December 27, 2013; Label: S.M. Entertainment; Format: DVD	—	—	
Japanese
History in Japan Vol. 1	Released: March 23, 2006; Label: Rhythm Zone; Format: DVD	—	—	
History in Japan Vol. 2	Released: March 28, 2007; Label: Rhythm Zone; Format: DVD	—	—	JPN: 11,414
History in Japan Vol. 3	Released: March 19, 2008; Label: Rhythm Zone; Format: DVD	—	—	JPN: 53,000
History in Japan Vol. 4	Released: October 28, 2009; Label: Rhythm Zone; Format: DVD	—	—	JPN: 110,000
Tohoshinki History In Japan Special	Released: September 29, 2010; Label: Rhythm Zone; Format: DVD	—	—	JPN: 69,215
72 Hours of TVXQ	Released: February 15, 2019; Label: Avex Pictures; Format: DVD	–	3	
"—" denotes releases that did not chart or were not released in that region.

=== Music video compilations ===
Title	Album details	Peak chart positions		Sales
Title	Album details	KOR	JPN	Sales
Japanese
Video Clip Collection -The One-	Released: March 17, 2010; Label: Rhythm Zone; Format: DVD	—	—	JPN: 179,004
"—" denotes releases that did not chart or were not released in that region.

=== Other releases ===
Title	Album details	Peak chart positions		Sales
Title	Album details	KOR	JPN	Sales
Japanese
Zoom Shika Shiranai Tohoshinki DVD	Released: September 29, 2010; Label: Rhythm Zone; Format: DVD	—	—	JPN: 61,226
Bigeast Fanclub Event 2012 — The Mission	Released: September 19, 2012; Label: Avex Trax; Format: DVD	—	—	
We are T ～First Memories～	Released: December 19, 2012; Label: Avex Trax; Format: DVD	—	—	
Bigeast Fanclub Event 2013 — The Mission II	Released: April 23, 2014; Label: Avex Trax; Format: DVD	—	—	
We are T ～Second Memories～	Released: February 24, 2016; Label: Avex Trax; Format: DVD	—	—	
Bigeast FANCLUB EVENT 2022 TOHOSHINKI THE GARDEN ~TOURS~	Released: November 23, 2022; Label: Avex Trax; Format: DVD, Blu-ray	—	6	
"—" denotes releases that did not chart or were not released in that region.

=== Featured releases ===
Title	Album details	Peak chart positions		Sales
Title	Album details	KOR	JPN	Sales
Korean
SMTOWN Live in Tokyo, Special Edition	Released: February 22, 2012; Label: S.M. Entertainment; Format: DVD	—	—	
I AM: SMTOWN Live at Madison Square Garden	Released: September 25, 2012 (Hong Kong); Label: S.M. Entertainment; Format: DVD	—	—	
Japanese
Rhythm Nation 2006 -The biggest indoor music festival-	Released: July 11, 2007; Label: Rhythm Zone; Format: DVD	—	—	
a-nation '07 Best Hit Selection	Released: July 25, 2007; Label: Avex Marketing; Format: CD, DVD	—	—	
a-nation '07 Best Hit Live	Released: November 7, 2007; Label: Avex Marketing; Format: CD, DVD	—	—	
Best Live DVD: Premium Live Dream Selection	Released: December 5, 2007; Label: Avex Marketing; Format: DVD	—	—	
Summer Freak by a-nation	Released: July 23, 2008; Label: Avex Marketing; Format: CD, DVD	—	—	
a-nation 2012 stadium fes.	Released: March 13, 2013; Label: Avex Marketing; Format: DVD	—	—	
"—" denotes releases that did not chart or were not released in that region.

== Others ==
=== Photo albums ===
Photo Album #	Information	Details of contents
1st (Korea)	TVXQ! The 1st Photo Album – Travel Sketches in L.A: Released: February 7, 2005; Photoshoot in Los Angeles, United States	1. Photobook; 2. Diary (approximately 224 pages); 3. Cassiopeia Special Story book 4. 2 VCDS with music videos and wallpapers 5. 6 mini posters
2nd (Korea)	TVXQ! The 2nd Photo Album – Summer Paradise in Borabora: Released: June 30, 2005; Photoshoot in Bora Bora Island, Tahiti	1. Photobook; 2. VCD (including MV material, wallpaper, screen saver); 3. DBSK Poster; 4. Stickers
3rd (Korea)	TVXQ! The 3rd Photo Album – The Prince in Prague: Released: December 9, 2006; Photoshoot in Prague, Czech Republic	1. 164 page photobook 2. VCD with video shot on location 3. Large sticker 4. Photo card gifts
4th (Korea)	Bonjour Paris – TVXQ! 2007 Paris Photobook Special Limited Edition: Released: November 22, 2007; Photoshoot in Paris, France	1. 3 photobooks, each containing 100 pages (24 x 29 cm): Bonjour Paris I, Bonjour Paris II, Parisien; 2. Photo diary (12 x 16 cm); 3. DVD (108 minutes)
5th (Korea)	A Week Holiday – TVXQ! 2008 Photobook: Released: July 21, 2008; Photoshoot in deserts and Grand Canyon of Arizona, United States	1. 2 Photobooks: It's Stylish (37.3 cm x 26.8 cm,108 pages), Camping (19.3 cm x 14.8 cm,86 pages with DVD); 2. DVD language: Korean, without subtitles 3. Limited edition
6th (Korea)	TI AMO TVXQ!: Released: July 22, 2014; Photoshoot in Milan, Italy	1. 3 Photobooks: La Storia (170 pages), La Via Della Liberta (170 pages), La Via Del Romanzo (90 pages); 2. Folded poster 3. DVD
7th (Korea)	Heliophilia!: Released: September 30, 2016; Photoshoot in Ko Samui, Thailand	1. 304 pages 2. Photocard; 3. Letter; 4. DVD
8th (Korea)	Life is a Journey: Released: January 31, 2019; Photoshoot in Scotland, Florence, and Jeju	1. 304 pages 2. 3 Post cards 3. Poster; 4. DVD (50 min.)
1st (Japan)	Tohoshinki 1st Artist Book – Tomorrow: 000777: Released: March 25, 2006	1. 116 page photobook 2. DVD with video footage (29 minutes); 3. 5 special mini photos
2nd (Japan)	Tohoshinki 2nd Artist Book – Shine: Released: September 11, 2007	1. 140 page photobook 2. DVD with photography sessions and interviews (23 minutes)
3rd (Japan)	Tohoshinki 3rd Artist Book – El Sol: Released: October 29, 2011; Photoshoot in Spain	1. 128 page photobook 2. B5-size hard cover
4th (Japan)	Tohoshinki – STAY: Released: September 25, 2015; Re-released (as STAY'elua): April 2, 2016; Photoshoot in Hawaii	STAY: 1. 128 page photobook 2. B4-size hard cover; STAY'elua: 1. 96 page photobook 2. B5-size paper back

=== Storybooks ===
Storybook #	Information	Details of Contents
1st	Dong Bang Shin Ki: The 1st Story Book "Hug"; Released: March 30, 2004; Length: N/A	Track listing CD: 1. Hug; 2. My Little Princess; 3. Oh Holy Night (feat. BoA); 4. My Little Princess (A cappella); 5. Hug (Instrumental); VCD: 1. Intro; 2. Jacket Sketch; 3. TVXQ Special Clip; 4. Music Video 'Hug'; 5. Wallpapers and Screensavers
2nd	Dong Bang Shin Ki: The 2nd Story Book 'The Way U Are; Released: August 21, 2004; Length: N/A; A 196-page story book comprising photos of the group.	Track listing CD: 1. The Way U Are; 2. Whatever They Say; 3. 옹달샘 이야기 1 (Mountain Spring Story 1); 4. 옹달샘 (Mountain Spring); 5. 옹달샘 이야기 2 (Mountain Spring Story 2); 6. Whatever They Say (Instrumental); VCD: 1. Intro; 2. Jacket Sketch; 3. Taiwan Promotion; 4. Samsung "Yepp" & Surprise Party for Micky; 5. F Concert with Cassiopeia; 6. My Little Princess MV; 7. My Little Princess (A cappella) MV; 8. Hotmail MV; 9. Drive MV; 10. The Way U Are MV; 11. 35 Pictures; 12. 2 Wallpapers; 13. 1 Screensaver
3rd	Dong Bang Shin Ki: The 3rd Story Book 'TVfXQ! Special Photo Essay In L.A; Released: November 20, 2004; Length: N/A	Track listing CD: 1. 믿어요 (Believe); 2. Thanks To; 3. Tri-Angle (Extended version); 4. 내 여자친구가 되어줄래?; 5. Whatever They Say (A cappella); 6. Million Men; 7. 지금처럼; 8. I Never Let Go; 9. 꼬마야; 10. 넌언제나; 11. HUG; 12. My Little Princess; 13. The Way U Are; 14. Tri-Angle; VCD: 1. Intro; 2. Hug MV; 3. My Little Princess MV; 4. My Little Princess (A cappella) MV; 5. The Way U Are MV; 6. Hotmail MV; 7. Drive MV; 8. Miduhyo MV; 9. Album Jacket Sketch; 10. Music Video Sketch; 11. Self Camera; 12. TVfXQ! In L.A; 13. 6 Special Stickers; 14. 15 Deluxe Wall Paper Images; 15. 2 Screen Savers; 16. 2 Pictures
4th	Dong Bang Shin Ki Vol. 2: Rising Sun Repackage 4th Story Book: Five Secret Story; Released: November 28, 2005; Length: N/A	Track listing CD: 1. Tonight; 2. Beautiful Life; 3. Rising Sun; 4. 바보 (Unforgettable); 5. 내가 허락할테니 (Love Is Never Gone); 6. Love After Love; 7. Dangerous Mind; 8. One; 9. Love Is..; 10. Free Your Mind; 11. 작은고백 (Your Love Is All I Need); 12. 약속했던 그때에 (Always There..); VCD: 1. Japan Special Photo Sketch; 2. Japan Event Sketch; 3. Rising Sun MV; 4. Making of Rising Sun; 5. 15 Wallpapers; 6. 2 Screensavers; 7. 6 Stickers
5th	Dong Bang Shin Ki: The 2nd Asia Tour Concert "O" Documentary Book; Released: April 10, 2007; Reprint: May 4, 2007; Length: N/A	1. 132- page Documentary Book; 2. Special Animation VCD; 3. Canvas Shoulder Bag
6th	Dong Bang Shin Ki: Please Be Mine : All About TVXQ Season 3 Making Book; Released: July	1. A 300-page photo storybook 2. English, Japanese, and Korean captions

== See also ==
- TVXQ discography
- List of songs by TVXQ
- List of awards and nominations received by TVXQ
