= Tree: Live Tour 2014 =

2014 concert tour by Tohoshinki

- Tour by Tohoshinki
- Location: Japan
- Associated album: Tree
- Start date: April 22, 2014
- End date: June 22, 2014
- No. of shows: 29
- Website: toho-jp.net/tour2014/

Tohoshinki concert chronology
- Time: Live Tour 2013 (2013); Tree: Live Tour 2014 (2014); Tistory: Special Live Tour (2014–15)

Tree: Live Tour 2014 (stylized as Tohoshinki Live Tour 2014 ～TREE～), also known as the Tree Tour, was the seventh Japanese concert tour (eleventh overall) by South Korean pop duo Tohoshinki, and was launched in support of their seventh Japanese studio album Tree (2014). It was first announced by the duo in November 2013, during the last show of their fanclub event tour, The Mission II. The theme of the tour was the Tree of Life, in which Tohoshinki, two beings born from the tree of life, use their spirit to save humanity from darkness.

The Tree Tour kicked off in Yokohama on April 22, 2014 and visited a total of ten cities and eleven venues in Japan. It concluded on June 22, 2014 in Osaka. Over 600,000 people attended the tour.

== Background ==
On November 23, 2013, Tohoshinki held their fanclub event tour The Mission II at the Saitama Super Arena, where they performed several songs from their last two albums and interacted with fans. At the end of the show, Tohoshinki revealed their plans to embark on a new nationwide tour in 2014. Following the duo's unveil, twenty-six dates for their tour were announced by their record label Avex Trax, but the name of the tour was not officially revealed until January 2014, when Tohoshinki announced the release of their seventh Japanese album, Tree.

Unlike the duo's previous Time: Live Tour 2013, which visited all five of Japan's major concert domes including the Nissan Stadium, the Tree Tour visited smaller concert halls and arenas. The duo stated that they wanted to perform in smaller venues in order to have better interactions with their audience. The Tree Tour began with three shows in the Yokohama Arena in April 2014.

On February 24, 2014, three additional dates were announced, extending the tour's shows at Tokyo Dome and Osaka Dome to four days each, making Tohoshinki the first non-Japanese band to hold concerts at the Tokyo Dome for three years in a row. On March 20, the tour's official website and merchandise were launched.

== Setlist ==
This setlist is representative of the first show in Yokohama. It does not represent all dates throughout the tour.

1. "Champion"
2. "SCREAM"
3. "Disvelocity"
4. "Cheering"
5. "Ai o Motto" (愛をもっと)
6. "Breeding Poison"
7. "Shinjiru Mama" (信じるまま)
8. "B.U.T (BE-AU-TY)"
9. "I love you"
10. "Kimi Ga Odoru, Natsu" (With All My Heart ～君が踊る、夏～)
11. "Wedding Dress"
12. "Hide & Seek"
13. "Crazy Crazy Crazy"
14. "Good Days"
15. "Over" (Changmin solo)
16. "Shout Out!" (Yunho solo)
17. "Spellbound" (Japanese version)
18. "Something" (Japanese version)
19. "Why? (Keep Your Head Down)" (Japanese version)
20. "Easy Mind"
21. "Humanoids" (Japanese version)
22. "TREE OF LIFE"

Encore

23. "miss you"
24. "Sweat"
25. "OCEAN" / "Somebody to Love"
26. "Good-bye for Now"

== Tour dates ==
List of concerts, showing date, city, venue, and attendance
Date	City	Venue	Attendance
April 22, 2014	Yokohama	Yokohama Arena	—
April 23, 2014	Yokohama	Yokohama Arena	—
April 24, 2014	Yokohama	Yokohama Arena	—
April 28, 2014	Nagoya	Nippon Gaishi Hall	—
April 29, 2014	Nagoya	Nippon Gaishi Hall	—
April 30, 2014	Nagoya	Nippon Gaishi Hall	—
May 3, 2014	Miyagi	Sekisui Heim Super Arena	—
May 4, 2014	Miyagi	Sekisui Heim Super Arena	—
May 7, 2014	Sapporo	Makomanai Sekisui Heim Ice Arena	—
May 8, 2014	Sapporo	Makomanai Sekisui Heim Ice Arena	—
May 11, 2014	Niigata	Toki Messe	—
May 12, 2014	Niigata	Toki Messe	—
May 16, 2014	Echizen	Sun Dome Fukui	—
May 17, 2014	Echizen	Sun Dome Fukui	—
May 20, 2014	Tokyo	Tokyo Dome	220,000
May 21, 2014	Tokyo	Tokyo Dome	220,000
May 23, 2014	Tokyo	Tokyo Dome	220,000
May 24, 2014	Tokyo	Tokyo Dome	220,000
May 27, 2014	Osaka	Osaka-jō Hall	—
May 28, 2014	Osaka	Osaka-jō Hall	—
June 4, 2014	Fukuoka	Marine Messe Fukuoka	—
June 5, 2014	Fukuoka	Marine Messe Fukuoka	—
June 6, 2014	Fukuoka	Marine Messe Fukuoka	—
June 11, 2014	Hiroshima	Hiroshima Green Arena	—
June 12, 2014	Hiroshima	Hiroshima Green Arena	—
June 18, 2014	Osaka	Kyocera Dome Osaka	—
June 19, 2014	Osaka	Kyocera Dome Osaka	—
June 21, 2014	Osaka	Kyocera Dome Osaka	—
June 22, 2014	Osaka	Kyocera Dome Osaka	—
Total			~600,000

== DVD ==
Tohoshinki Live Tour 2014: Tree

Video by Tohoshinki
- Released: August 27, 2014
- Recorded: April – June 2014
- Genre: J-pop; dance-pop
- Length: 201 minutes
- Language: Japanese
- Label: Avex Trax
- Director: Masato Yoshikiawa
- Producer: Sam; Yoko Kikuta

Tohoshinki chronology
Live World Tour: Catch Me in Seoul (2014)	Tohoshinki Live Tour 2014: Tree (2014)

Tohoshinki Live Tour 2014 ～TREE～ is a live DVD concert film by South Korean pop duo Tohoshinki, released on August 27, 2014 in Japan. The DVD was filmed during the duo's seventh Japan-wide concert tour Tree, which ran from April to June 2014. The tour stopped by ten cities and visited eleven different venues in Japan, including the Tokyo Dome and Kyocera Dome Osaka, rounding up to a total of 29 shows.

=== History ===
The DVD documents the live performances during the tour's four-day stop at the Tokyo Dome, between May 20 and 24, 2014. It was released in three separate editions; a 2-DVD standard edition, a 3-DVD limited edition, and a Blu-ray. The limited edition also includes a third DVD, which features backstage interviews, behind-the-scene footage, a tour documentary, an MC digest segment, and an additional photobook pamphlet.

=== Track listing ===
Disc 1
No.	Title	Length
1.	"Champion"
2.	"SCREAM"
3.	"Disvelocity"
4.	"Cheering"
5.	"Ai o Motto (愛をもっと)"
6.	"Breeding Poison"
7.	"Shinjiru Mama (信じるまま)"
8.	"B.U.T (BE-AU-TY)"
9.	"I love you"
10.	"With All My Heart 〜君が踊る、夏〜"
11.	"Wedding Dress"
12.	"Hide & Seek"
13.	"Crazy Crazy Crazy"
14.	"Good Days"
15.	"Over" (Changmin solo)
16.	"Shout Out!" (Yunho solo)
17.	"SURI SURI (Spellbound)" (Japanese version)
18.	"Something" (Japanese version)

Disc 2
No.	Title	Length
19.	"Why? (Keep Your Head Down)" (Japanese version)
20.	"Easy Mind～We Are! (ウィーアー!)"
21.	"Humanoids" (Japanese version)
22.	"TREE OF LIFE"
23.	"miss you"
24.	"Sweat"
25.	"OCEAN～Somebody To Love"
26.	"Good-bye for Now"
27.	"MV Movie in Tokyo Dome"

Disc 3 – Limited edition
No.	Title	Length
1.	"Live Digest in Osaka-Jo Hall"
2.	"Backstage Documentary"
3.	"MC Digest"
4.	"End Roll Movie"

=== Chart performance ===
Live Tour 2014: Tree debuted at number one on the Oricon DVD Chart, selling 104,000 copies on the first week of release. It was Tohoshinki's fifth DVD release to debut at number-one in Japan. The Blu-ray edition also debuted at number one on the Oricon Blu-ray Chart, selling 18,000 copies on the first week.

The following week, both the DVD and the Blu-ray fell to number three. The DVD stayed charted in the top ten for four consecutive weeks. It ultimately charted for 13 weeks and sold 116,000 units in Japan, becoming the eleventh best-selling DVD of the year. The Blu-ray edition stayed charted for six weeks, selling 20,000 copies.

=== Charts ===
==== Weekly charts ====
Chart (2014)	Peak position
Oricon Music DVD Chart	1
Oricon Music Blu-ray Chart	1

==== Year-end charts ====
Chart (2014)	Peak position
Oricon Music DVD Chart	11

==== Sales ====
Released	Oricon chart	Peak	Debut week sales	Sales total	Chart run
August 27, 2014	Weekly Music DVD Chart	1	104,213	115,903	13 weeks
August 27, 2014	Weekly Music Blu-ray Chart	1	18,537	20,394	6 weeks

=== Release history ===
Region	Date	Format	Label
Japan	August 27, 2014	DVD and Blu-ray	Avex Trax
Taiwan	September 26, 2014	DVD	Avex Taiwan

== Personnel ==
Credits are taken from the DVD's liner notes.

=== Main ===
- Executive producer
  - Lee Soo-man (S.M. Entertainment)
  - Max Matsuura (Avex Group)
- General producer
  - Nam So-young (S.M. Entertainment Japan)
  - Ryuhei Chiba (Avex Group)
- Total stage producer – Sam
- Tour advisor – Katsumi Kuroiwa
- Tour producer – Yoko Kikuta
- Tour director – Masato Yoshikiawa
- Tour contents producer – Toshiro Hayashi
- Tour contents director – Nobuto Kkura, Naoko Kojima
- Technical director – Naoto Hori, Hidetomo Suzuki
- Visual director – Kenta Sekine
- Shooting crew director – Hiroko Ishizuchi
- Director of photography – Koji Matsuura
- Choreographer – Shige, Achi, Taichi
- Stylist – Yosuke Sasagawa

=== Band and performers ===
- Dancers – Sonny, 50, Ywki, Achi, Tamiya, k-sk, Yoshiki, Ryota, Hiroto, Rui, Rika, Lina
- Band master and keyboards – Yoichiro Kakizaki
- Drums – Tetsuya Hatamo
- Bass – Watru Suzuki
- Guitar – Kiyoto Konda
- Percussion – Masao Fukunaga
