= Time: Live Tour 2013 =

2013 concert tour by Tohoshinki

- Tour by Tohoshinki
- Location: Japan
- Associated album: Time
- Start date: April 27, 2013
- End date: August 18, 2013
- No. of shows: 18
- Website: toho-jp.net/time/tour/

Tohoshinki concert chronology
- Catch Me: Live World Tour (2012–13); Time: Live Tour 2013 (2013); Tree: Live Tour 2014 (2014)

Time: Live Tour 2013 (stylized as Tohoshinki Live Tour 2013 ～TIME～), also known as the Time Tour, was the sixth Japanese concert tour (tenth overall) by South Korean pop duo Tohoshinki, in support of their sixth Japanese studio album Time (2013). The tour visited all five of Japan's major concert Domes and the Nissan Stadium, the largest seated stadium in Japan.

The Time Tour broke several attendance records in the country; it was the first Dome tour held by non-Japanese Asian performers and the fourth held by international artists in Japan. Among Japanese-singing artists, Tohoshinki were the sixteenth artists to do so. The tour was the highest-attended tour by an international music act in Japan. The duo were also the first international artists to headline a concert at the Nissan Stadium in Yokohama. Tohoshinki have said on their first five-Dome tour, "It's a dream come true."

== History ==
The special site for the tour was official launched on April 18, 2013. Official goods were released on the same day as well.

== Records ==
We're very happy that the five-dome tour we've dreamed of going on since our debut is finally going to happen. We'll work hard to prepare great music and performances, so please look forward to it, and we hope to see your support and interest.

— Tohoshinki, on their achievement on having a five Dome tour to enews on November 21, 2012

The tour was officially announced on November 22, 2012, by Tohoshinki's Korean agency, S.M. Entertainment. Commencing the tour with three shows at the Saitama Super Arena in April 2013, the tour then embarked on its five-Dome tour, which include the Sapporo Dome, Nagoya Dome, Fukuoka Yahoo! Dome, Kyocera Osaka Dome, and the Tokyo Dome, consisting of twelve dates over a period of three months. An S.M. representative said, "Any concert hall with a ‘dome’ in it is a place where only the best get to stand. This proves just how big TVXQ is in Japan." On February 21, 2013, four more dates were added to their five-Dome tour, including one extra performance at the Nagoya Dome, two at the Kyocera Dome and one at the Tokyo Dome, increasing the expected to attend to more than 700,000. Tohoshinki are the first non-Japanese Asian artists to hold a complete five-Dome tour in Japan, and the sixteenth Japanese-singing artists to do so. Among other foreign artists who have held five-Dome tours, Tohoshinki came in fourth, following Bon Jovi in 2003, the Eagles in 2004 and Billy Joel in 2006.

On April 27, 2013, during the duo's first show in Saitama, they announced that the tour's final shows would be held at the Nissan Stadium, Japan's largest seated stadium, on August 17 and 18. Tohoshinki are the first international musical act to perform at the venue, setting another record for being the first foreign artists in Japan to bring in an audience of over 850,000. An additional 30,000 people watched the Nissan Stadium concert live in theaters across Japan.

== Commercial performance ==
The average ticket price for the Time: Live Tour 2013 was reported to be ₩120,000 (¥10,600). One of the highest-grossing concert tours of the year, it grossed over US$90 million (₩102 billion) from 18 shows. A sell-out, the tour attracted over 890,000 people from 18 shows and an additional 30,000 people from cinema screenings, a dramatic increase from the 550,000 fans who attended their last nationwide tour in 2012.

== Broadcasts and recordings ==
A recording of the tour's three concerts at the Tokyo Dome was televised, and it aired on Fuji Television on August 31, 2013. In October 2013, the same recording was released DVD and Blu-ray. Within the first week, the DVD sold over 120,000 copies and the Blu-ray sold over 18,000 copies, debuting at number one on their respective charts. A separate recording of the tour's two final concerts at the Nissan Stadium was also televised, and it aired on Fuji Television in late October 2013. In December 2013, the Nissan recording was released on DVD and Blu-ray. Both peaked at number one on their respective charts, selling nearly 68,000 copies in the first week.

== Setlist ==
This setlist is representative of their first show in Saitama. It does not represent all dates throughout the tour.

1. "Fated"
2. "ANDROID"
3. "Superstar"
4. "I Don't Know"
5. "STILL"
6. "Duet"
7. "One More Thing"
8. "Y3K"
9. "Purple Line"
10. "Humanoids" (Japanese version)
11. "Heart, Mind and Soul"
12. "I Know"
13. "One and Only One"
14. "Rat Tat Tat"
15. "T-Style" (Yunho solo)
16. "Rock with U" (Changmin solo)
17. "O'-Sei.Han.Gō"(O-正・反・合) (Japanese version) (In Nissan Stadium) / BLINK (In Tokyo Dome)
18. "Survivor"
19. "Share the World"
20. "Ocean"
21. "Aitakute Aitakute Tamaranai" (逢いたくて逢いたくてたまらない)
22. "Catch Me -If you wanna-" (Japanese version)

Encore

23. "Why? (Keep Your Head Down)" (Japanese version)
24. "SCREAM"
25. "SHINE"
26. "We Are!? (ウィーアー!?)
27. "Summer Dream"
28. "In Our Time"

Notes

- During the Nissan Stadium concerts, Tohoshinki performed "OCEAN" in place of "Sky". They also performed "Somebody to Love" after "In Our Time".

== Tour dates ==
List of concerts, showing date, city, venue, and tickets sold
Date	City	Venue	Attendance
April 27, 2013	Saitama	Saitama Super Arena	—N/a
April 28, 2013	Saitama	Saitama Super Arena	—N/a
April 29, 2013	Saitama	Saitama Super Arena	—N/a
May 5, 2013	Sapporo	Sapporo Dome	—N/a
May 10, 2013	Nagoya	Nagoya Dome	—N/a
May 11, 2013	Nagoya	Nagoya Dome	—N/a
May 12, 2013	Nagoya	Nagoya Dome	—N/a
May 25, 2013	Fukuoka	Fukuoka Yahoo! Dome	—N/a
May 26, 2013	Fukuoka	Fukuoka Yahoo! Dome	—N/a
June 5, 2013	Osaka	Kyocera Osaka Dome	—N/a
June 6, 2013	Osaka	Kyocera Osaka Dome	—N/a
June 8, 2013	Osaka	Kyocera Osaka Dome	—N/a
June 9, 2013	Osaka	Kyocera Osaka Dome	—N/a
June 15, 2013	Tokyo	Tokyo Dome	165,000
June 16, 2013	Tokyo	Tokyo Dome	165,000
June 17, 2013	Tokyo	Tokyo Dome	165,000
August 17, 2013	Yokohama	Nissan Stadium	150,000
August 18, 2013	Yokohama	Nissan Stadium	150,000
Total			~890,000

== Personnel ==
=== Main ===
- Tour organizer: Avex Group, SM Entertainment
- Sponsors:
  - Glico
  - Seven-Eleven Japan
  - 7net Shopping
- Executive producers – Lee Soo-man (S.M. Entertainment), Max Matsuura (Avex Group)
- General producers – Nam So-young (S.M. Entertainment Japan), Ryuhai Chiba (Avex Group)
- Tour producer – Yoko Kikuta
- Tour director – Masato Yoshikawa
- Stage producer – Sam
- Executive supervisors – Shinji Hayashi, Akira Akutsu
- Artist management – Kang Sung-chang, Kim Jung-min, Her Young-joo, Charlene Ryu
- Sound direction – Katsutoshi Yasuhara
- Stylist – Yosuko Sasagawa
- Hair and make-up – Rei Calin, Hiro
- Art designer – Masanori Nagase
- Lighting director – Yuichi Kobayashi
- Visual director – Osamu Nakamoto
- Choreographers – Masao, Pino, Shige, Achi, Kazuki, Taichi
- Dancers – Sonny, 50, Ywki, Achi, Tamiya, k-sk, Yoshiki, Ryota, Hiroto, Sappy, Chali, Rui

=== Band ===
- Tohoshinki (Yunho, Changmin) – Lead vocals
- Yoichiro Kakizaki – Band master, keyboards
- Tatsuya Hatano – drums
- Kazuhiro Sunaga – bass
- Kiyoto Konda – guitar
- Masao Fukunaga – percussion
