= Hide & Seek (TVXQ song) =

Single by Tohoshinki

from the album Tree
- A-side: "Something"
- Released: February 5, 2014
- Recorded: 2013
- Genre: J-pop; rock
- Label: Avex Trax
- Songwriter: Kaoru Kondou
- Producer: Shinjiroh Inoue

Tohoshinki singles chronology
"Something" (2014)	"Hide & Seek" / "Something" (2014)	"Spellbound" (2014)

"Hide & Seek" is a song by South Korean pop duo Tohoshinki, taken from their seventh Japanese studio album, Tree (2014). Serving as Tohoshinki's's 40th Japanese single, the song was released as a double A-sided single with "Something" on February 5, 2014 by Avex Trax. The fourth and final single release for Tree, the single was released in three editions – a CD+DVD version, a CD only version, and a Bigeast Board edition.

The song served as the theme song for the Japanese television drama, Team Batista 4, which premiered on January 7, 2014. A restrained rock song with baritone vocal range, the producers of "Hide & Seek" have described the song to be Tohoshinki's "most intense" song to date. The song was released onto various radio stations across Japan on January 16, 2014.

"Hide & Seek" reached to number two on the Oricon Singles Chart and the Billboard Japan Hot 100. Within a week of its release, the single was certified gold by the Recording Industry Association of Japan (RIAJ) for shipments of over 100,000.

== Release and promotion ==
"Hide & Seek" was announced in December 2013, and shipments were sent off on February 3, 2014. The single was released in three editions – Version A, a CD+DVD single, a CD only single, and a CD single exclusive to the members of Bigeast, Tohoshinki's official Japanese fan club. To promote the record, the single's cover art was printed on many public transportation vehicles around major cities in Japan.

== Chart performance ==
On its first day of release, the physical single sold 74,040 copies, debuting at number two on the daily Oricon Singles Chart. "Hide & Seek" debuted at number three on the digital Recochoku, number six on iTunes, and number one on Mu Mu. It debuted at number two on the weekly Oricon Singles Chart and the Billboard Japan Hot 100. "Hide & Seek" peaked at number 47 on the Billboard Japan Adult Contemporary Airplay and number 22 on the Billboard Japan Hot Top Airplay.

== Formats and track listings ==
- Japanese digital download EP
1. "Hide & Seek" – 5:18
2. "Something" (Japanese version) – 4:01
3. "Hide & Seek" (Markus Bøgelund's Audio Ninja Remix) – 4:51
4. "Hide & Seek" (Less Vocal) – 5:18
5. "Something" (Less Vocal) – 4:01
- Japanese CD+DVD single AVCK-79187/B

Disc 1 (CD)

1. "Hide & Seek"
2. "Something" (Japanese version)
3. "Hide & Seek" (Less Vocal)
4. "Something" (Less Vocal)

Disc 2 (DVD)

1. "Something" (Video Clip)
2. Off Shot Movie (First Press Limited Edition only)
- Japanese CD single AVCK-79175
1. "Hide & Seek"
2. "Something" (Japanese version)
3. "Hide & Seek" (Markus Bøgelund's Audio Ninja Remix)
4. "Hide & Seek" (Less Vocal)
5. "Something" (Less Vocal)
- Japanese CD single (Bigeast limited edition) AVC1-79176
1. "Hide & Seek"
2. "Something"
3. "Hide & Seek" (Less Vocal)
4. "Something" (Less Vocal)

== Charts ==
Chart (2014)	Peak position
Japan (Oricon Singles Chart)	2
Billboard Japan Hot 100	2
Billboard Japan Adult Contemporary Airplay	47
Billboard Japan Hot Top Airplay	22

=== Sales ===
Released	Oricon chart	Peak	Debut week sales	Sales total
February 5, 2014	Daily Singles Chart	2	107,413	119,291
February 5, 2014	Weekly Singles Chart	2	107,413	119,291
February 5, 2014	Monthly Singles Chart	5	107,413	119,291
February 5, 2014	Yearly Singles Chart	56	107,413	119,291

Notes

- Sales coincide with the single "Something".

== Certifications ==
Region	Certification	Certified units/sales
Japan (RIAJ)	Gold	100,000^{^}
^{^} Shipments figures based on certification alone.

== Release history ==
Region	Date	Format	Label
Japan	February 5, 2014	CD; CD+DVD; digital download	Avex Trax
South Korea	February 5, 2014	Digital download	S.M. Entertainment; KT Music
Taiwan	March 7, 2014	CD; CD+DVD	Avex Taiwan
