= Tree (TVXQ album) =

Studio album by Tohoshinki
- Released: March 5, 2014
- Recorded: 2012–2013
- Genre: J-pop; EBM; R&B; hip hop; dance-pop; rock
- Length: 60:27
- Language: Japanese
- Label: Avex Trax
- Producer: Nam So-young; Ryuhei Chiba; Sean Alexander; Daniel Rothmann; GL Music; Yoo Young-jin; Steven Lee; Hitchhiker; Andreas Stone Johansson; Tim Hawes; Obi Mhondera

Tohoshinki chronology
Tense (2014)	Tree (2014)	Live World Tour: Catch Me in Seoul (2014)

Singles from Tree
- 1. "Ocean" Released: June 12, 2013; 2. "Scream" Released: September 4, 2013; 3. "Very Merry Xmas" Released: November 27, 2013; 4. "Hide & Seek / Something" Released: February 5, 2014; 5. "Tree of Life" Released: March 5, 2014

Tree (stylized in all caps) is the seventh Japanese studio album (fourteenth overall) by South Korean pop duo Tohoshinki, released by Avex Trax on March 5, 2014. The record was released in four physical versions, each with a seasonal theme cover – Version A (Spring/Summer), a CD+DVD version with music videos; Version B (Autumn), another CD+DVD version with off-shot movies; Version C (Winter), a CD only version with two bonus tracks; and Version D, a fan club limited edition with a CD-Extra. Musically, Tree is a varied pop music album that is influenced by a broad range of musical genres, such as electronic dance music, hip hop, R&B, swing jazz, rock music, power ballads, and reggae. Recording for the album began well before the launch of their sixth Japanese studio album Time in early 2013.

Tree was Tohoshinki's fourth consecutive album to debut at number one on the Oricon Albums Chart and the Billboard Japan Top Albums, selling 225,000 copies on its first week of release. With Tree, Tohoshinki became the first foreign group in Japan to have three consecutive studio albums with first-week sales of over 200,000 copies, breaking Bon Jovi's thirteen-year record. Less than four weeks after release, the album earned a platinum certification by the Recording Industry Association of Japan (RIAJ) for shipments of over 250,000 copies.

All four of the album's commercially successful singles – "Ocean", "Scream", "Very Merry Xmas", and "Hide & Seek / Something" – debuted at number two on the Oricon Singles Chart and achieved gold certifications by the RIAJ. To promote the album, Tohoshinki embarked on their seventh nationwide tour, Tree: Live Tour 2014 from April to June 2014.

== Background and release ==
Tree was officially announced on January 10, 2014, through Tohoshinki's official website. It contains a total of fourteen tracks, including two bonus tracks, all which were revealed on January 21, 2014. Following the convention of using the first letter 'T' in their album titles, the duo explained in a January 2014 interview that the name "Tree" was meant to be used as a metaphor for their growth as artists. Tree is also an element of growth in East Asian mythology. Yunho and Changmin added in a later interview that the name was actually inspired by the children's picture book The Giving Tree, and that Tree sends a message about giving.

Recording sessions for Tree coincided with the duo's seventh Korean album, Tense, which was released in January 2014. Similar to the duo's last two Japanese records, Tree delves into the usual electronic landscape in its dance tracks, some with hip hop and rock influences. The duo also experimented with genres they previously have not attempted before, such as swing jazz and reggae. A variety of different power ballads permeate throughout the album; "I Love You", written by Katsuhiko Yamamoto, emphasizes the duo's emotive vocal harmony with minimalist programming. Only 22 people were behind the song's instrumental arrangement, playing the piano, guitar, cello, and strings. However, Yamamoto's other composition in the album, "Ai o Motto" (愛をもっと), uses smooth R&B arrangements. The song was written after the 2011 Tōhoku earthquake and tsunami and its lyrical content refers to hope and faith.

On January 28, 2014, the official covers for Tree were revealed on Japanese newspapers, music retailers and Tohoshinki's official website. Each album cover represented a season of the year; Version A, a CD+DVD version with music videos, fell on Spring/Summer; Version B, a CD+DVD version with off-shot movies and live performances, fell on Autumn; and Version C, a CD-only version with two bonus tracks, fell on Winter. Version D, which features bare-shouldered Yunho and Changmin on the cover, was a limited edition that was exclusive for registered members of Bigeast, Tohoshinki's official fanclub in Japan. First press limited editions also included a photo card.

A short version of the music video for the album's promotional single "Tree of Life" premiered on February 4, 2014. Tree was introduced on TV Osaka's Japan Countdown on February 9, 2014. On February 15, the special website for Tree was opened, and the lyrics to seven songs in the album were revealed. In early March 2014, Tohoshinki celebrated the album release with an exhibition opened in Shibuya Tower Records in Tokyo. Pre-orders for Tree were sent out a few days prior to the official March 5 release date.

== Promotion ==
In August 2013, the duo performed "Ocean" and "Scream" at the Nissan Stadium in Yokohama, the last stop of their Time: Live Tour 2013. In November 2013, during their fan-meet concert The Mission II in Saitama, Tohoshinki revealed plans for a new nationwide tour in 2014. Following the duo's unveil, twenty-six dates for their tour were announced, and Tree: Live Tour 2014 was officially announced in January 2014. The tour is set to begin in April 2014 with three shows in the Yokohama Arena.

=== Singles ===
"Ocean" was released as the first single from the album, on June 12, 2013. Released three months after their sixth Japanese album Time, the duo promoted "Ocean" in their 2013 Japan-wide concert tour, Time: Live Tour 2013. The duo performed "Ocean" at the Nissan Stadium in Yokohama, the last stop of the tour. "Ocean" is the album's best-selling single, with nearly 150,000 copies sold on its first week of release.

"Scream" was released as the album's second single on September 4, 2013. Serving as the theme song for the Japanese horror film Sadako 3D 2, the song was first revealed in July 2013. Like "Ocean", Tohoshinki also promoted "Scream" in their Time Tour, and debuted their first performance of "Scream" at the Nissan Stadium. "Scream" debuted at number two on the Oricon Singles Chart and peaked at number two on Billboard's Japan Hot 100. Also debuting at number two, the album's third single, "Very Merry Xmas", was released on November 27, 2013, as a special Christmas single. Supported by the holiday season, the song charted considerably well in radio airplay charts compared to "Ocean" and "Scream", both which have failed to chart in the top fifteen. "Very Merry Xmas" charted in the top ten in the Billboard Japan Hot Top Airplay, and peaked at number nineteen on the Billboard Japan Adult Contemporary Airplay. Within a week of its release, the single was certified gold by the Recording Industry Association of Japan (RIAJ) for shipments of over 100,000.

The double A-sided "Hide & Seek / "Something" was released as the album's fourth and final single, on February 5, 2014, one month before the official release date of Tree. "Something", originally recorded in Korean, was first released in South Korea on January 6, 2014, as the lead single of the duo's seventh Korean studio album Tense. "Hide & Seek" was featured as the theme song for the Japanese television drama, Team Batista 4, which premiered on Japan's Fuji TV on January 7, 2014.

== Commercial performance ==
Debuting atop the daily Oricon Albums Chart and selling 156,491 copies on its first day of release, Tree maintained its number one spot for the next four days, making it Tohoshinki's first studio album and second overall release to top the daily Oricon Albums Chart for five days in a row.

Tree debuted at number one on both the weekly Oricon Albums Chart and the Billboard Japan Top Albums, selling approximately 225,000 copies on its first week of release. It gave Tohoshinki their fourth consecutive number one album in Japan. The album was Tohoshinki's third studio album and fourth record to shift over 200,000 copies on its first week, breaking a record previously set by Bon Jovi thirteen years ago. The album was Tohoshinki's second studio album to top the Oricon's monthly album chart, selling 252,155 copies by March 31, 2014. It was certified platinum by the Recording Industry Association of Japan less than four weeks after it was released.

== Track listing ==
Tree track list
No.	Title	Lyrics	Music	Arrangement	Length
1.	"I Love You -Introduction-"	Katsuhiko Yamamoto	Katsuhiko Yamamoto	Katsuhiko Yamamoto	1:42
2.	"Champion"	H.U.B	Sean Alexander (Avenue 52); Jeremy Thurber	Sean Alexander; Jeremy Thurber	3:51
3.	"Breeding Poison"	H.U.B	Lasse Lindorff; Daniel Rothmann; Harry Wilkins	Lasse Lindorff; Daniel Rothmann; Harry Wilkins	3:34
4.	"More Love" (Ai o Motto (愛をもっと))	Katsuhiko Yamamoto	Katsuhiko Yamamoto	Katsuhiko Yamamoto; Daisuke Kadowaki	5:51
5.	"Cheering"	Shinjiroh Inoue	Shinjiroh Inoue	Shinjiroh Inoue	4:19
6.	"Something" (Japanese version)	Yoo Young-jin; H.U.B	Yoo Young-jin; Yoo Han-jin	Yoo Young-jin; Yoo Han-jin	4:02
7.	"Good Days"	Shinjiroh Inoue	Shinjiroh Inoue	Shinjiroh Inoue	6:14
8.	"Hide & Seek"	H.U.B	Kaoru Kondou	Shinjiroh Inoue	5:18
9.	"As We Believe" (Shinjiru Mama (信じるまま))	H.U.B	Steven Lee; Drew Ryan Scott	Steven Lee; Drew Ryan Scott	3:14
10.	"Scream"	H.U.B	Hitchhiker	Hitchhiker	3:44
11.	"Crazy Crazy Crazy"	H.U.B	Steven Lee; Andreas Stone Johansson; Fredrik Hult (Firefly); Andreas Öberg	Steven Lee; Andreas Stone Johansson; Fredrik Hult; Andreas Öberg	3:57
12.	"Ocean"	Shinjiroh Inoue	Shinjiroh Inoue	Shinjiroh Inoue	5:14
13.	"Tree of Life"	Shinjiroh Inoue	Anders Grahn; Carlos Okabe	Shinjiroh Inoue	5:38
14.	"Good-bye for Now"	Shinjiroh Inoue	Katerina Bramley; Obi Mhondera (Zebra1); Tim Hawes (Zebra1)	Katerina Bramley; Zebra1	3:49
Total length:					60:27

Tree Version C (Winter) track list – CD bonus tracks
No.	Title	Lyrics	Music	Arrangement	Length
15.	"I Love You -Full version-"	Katsuhiko Yamamoto	Katsuhiko Yamamoto	Katsuhiko Yamamoto	4:44
16.	"Very Merry Xmas"	Shinjiroh Inoue	Chris Buseck; Tom Hugo	Tomoji Sogawa	4:06
Total length:					69:17

Tree Version D (Bigeast limited edition) track list – CD extra
No.	Title	Length
15.	"CD-Extra: Tree of Life" (Lip version)

Notes

- Version D is only available on the Bigeast Official Shop, which requires Bigeast membership.

Version A (Spring / Summer) – Disc 2 (DVD)
No.	Title	Length
1.	"Ocean" (Video clip)
2.	"Scream" (Video clip)
3.	"Very Merry Xmas" (Video clip)
4.	"White" (Video clip)
5.	"Something" (Video clip)
6.	"Tree of Life" (Video clip)
7.	"Ocean" (Dance version)
8.	"Scream" (Dance version)
9.	"Something" (Dance version)
10.	"Catch Me -If you wanna-" (Live at A-nation 2013 stadium festival)
11.	"Scream" (Live at A-nation 2013 stadium festival)
12.	"Humanoids" (Live at A-nation 2013 stadium festival)

Tree Version B (Autumn) – Disc 2 (DVD)
No.	Title	Length
1.	"In Our Time" (Off shot movie)
2.	"White" (Off shot movie)
3.	"Tree of Life" (Off shot movie)
4.	"Album jacket photography" (Off shot movie)
5.	"One and Only One" (Live Tour 2013 "Time" documentary film)
6.	"In Our Time" (Live Tour 2013 "Time" Final in Nissan Stadium documentary film)

== Personnel ==
Credits adapted from the liner notes of Tree.

Performers and musicians

- Tohoshinki (Yunho, Changmin) – vocals, background vocals
- Yoo Young-jin – background vocals (track 6)
- Kim Hyeon-a – background vocals (track 6)
- Kumi Sasaki – background vocals (track 13)
- Yuko Ohtaki – background vocals (track 13)
- Hiroaki Takeuchi – background vocals (track 13)
- Robin – background vocals (track 14)
- Katsuhiko Yamamoto – piano (tracks 1, 15)
- Tomohiko Osakabe – bass (track 4)
- Kadowaki strings – strings (tracks 4, 15)
- Shinjiroh Inoue – background vocals (track 13); all instruments (tracks 5, 8, 12); piano (track 13); guitar (tracks 7, 13)
- Kang Soo-ho – drums (track 6)
- Jeon Seong-sik – double bass (track 6)
- Sam Lee – guitar (track 6)
- Kim Dong-ha – trumpet (track 6)
- Lee Han-jin – trombone (track 6)
- Kim Sang-il – saxophone (track 6)
- Taizo Nakamura – bass (tracks 7, 13)
- Shika strings – strings (tracks 7, 13)
- Steven Lee – keyboards (track 9, 11)
- hitchhiker – guitar, keyboards (track 10)
- Andreas Stone Johansson – keyboards (track 11)
- Andreas Oberg – guitar (track 11)
- Kentaro Kawai – guitar (track 15)
- Tomoji Sogawa – piano (track 16)
- Kiyoto Konda – guitar(track 16)
- Konno strings – strings (track 16)

Technical personnel

- Katsutoshi Yasuhara – direction (tracks 1–5, 7–9, 11–16)
- Yoo Young-jin – direction, recording, mixing (track 6)
- hitchhiker – direction, sound processing (track 10)
- Atsushi Hattori – mixing, recording (tracks 1, 7, 15, 16); mixing (track 14)
- Jung Eui-seok – mixing, recording (track 10)
- Naoki Yamada – mixing (track 2–5, 8, 9, 11–13)
- Hideaki Jinbu – recording (tracks 1–5, 7–9, 11–16)
- Oh Sung-gun with assistant Song Ju-yong – recording (track 6)
- Kwang Jung-shin with assistant Jeong Mo-yun – recording (track 6)
- Junichi Shinohara – editing (track 3)
- Makoto Yamadoi – editing (track 4)
- Katsuhiko Yamamoto – programming (tracks 4, 15)
- Shinjiroh Inoue – programming (tracks 7, 13)
- Steven Lee – programming (tracks 9, 11)
- Andreas Stone Johansson – programming (track 11)
- Tomoji Sogawa – programming (track 16)

== Charts ==
=== Weekly charts ===
Chart (2014)	Peak position
Japanese Albums (Oricon)	1
Japanese Top Albums (Billboard)	1
South Korean Albums (Gaon)	15
Taiwanese Albums (G-Music)	9
Taiwanese J-pop Albums (G-Music)	4

=== Year-end charts ===
Chart (2014)	Position
Japanese Albums (Oricon)	13

== Sales and certifications ==
Region	Certification	Certified units/sales
Japan (RIAJ)	Platinum	265,013
South Korea	—	33,644

== Release history ==
Region	Date	Format	Label
Japan	March 5, 2014	CD; CD+DVD; digital download	Avex Trax
Taiwan	April 3, 2014	CD; CD+DVD	Avex Taiwan
South Korea	March 19, 2014	Digital download	S.M. Entertainment; KT Music
South Korea	April 4, 2014	CD; CD+DVD	S.M. Entertainment; KT Music

== See also ==
- TVXQ albums discography
- List of Oricon number-one albums of 2014
