= Very Merry Xmas =

Single by Tohoshinki

from the album Tree
- B-side: "White"
- Released: November 27, 2013
- Recorded: 2013
- Genre: J-pop; Christmas
- Length: 22:11
- Label: Avex Trax
- Songwriters: Chris Buseck; Tom Hugo Hemansen; Shinjiroh Inoue
- Producer: Shinjiroh Inoue

Tohoshinki singles chronology
"Scream" (2013)	"Very Merry Xmas" (2013)	"Something" (2014)

"Very Merry Xmas" is the 39th Japanese single by South Korean pop duo Tohoshinki. Described as an upbeat Christmas carol, "Very Merry Xmas" was released on November 27, 2013, by Avex Trax as the third single from their seventh Japanese studio album, Tree. It was released in three versions – a CD+DVD version, a CD only version, and a Bigeast Board edition.

The song debuted at number two on the Oricon Singles Chart and peaked at number three on Billboard's Japan Hot 100. Selling over 116,000 copies in a week, "Very Merry Xmas" was certified gold by the Recording Industry Association of Japan (RIAJ) for shipments of over 100,000. As of December 2013, "Very Merry Xmas" has reported sales of 130,849 according to the Oricon.

"Very Merry Xmas" is written by Chris Buseck, Tom Hugo Hemansen, and is produced by Shinjiroh Inoue, a frequent collaborator of Tohoshinki. Inoue also wrote the lyrics to both songs, and wrote the B-side song "White".

== Formats and track listings ==
- Digital download
1. "Very Merry Xmas" – 4:06
2. "White" – 4:56
3. "Very Merry Xmas" (music video) – 4:24
- CD+DVD single AVCK-79167/B

Disc 1 (CD)

1. "Very Merry Xmas" – 4:08
2. "White" – 4:58
3. "Very Merry Xmas" (Less Vocal) – 4:08
4. "White" (Less Vocal) – 4:58

Disc 2 (DVD)

1. "Very Merry Xmas" (Video Clip)
2. "Very Merry Xmas" (Off Shot Movie) (First Press Limited Edition only)
- CD single AVCK-79168
1. "Very Merry Xmas" – 4:08
2. "White" – 4:58
3. "Very Merry Xmas" (Markus Bogelund's Audio Ninja Remix)
4. "Very Merry Xmas" (Less Vocal) – 4:08
5. "White" (Less Vocal) – 4:58
- Bigeast Board edition single

Disc 1 (CD)

1. "Very Merry Xmas" – 4:08
2. "White" – 4:58
3. "Very Merry Xmas" (Less Vocal) – 4:08
4. "White" (Less Vocal) – 4:58

Disc 2 (DVD)

1. "Very Merry Xmas" (Video Clip)

== Charts ==
=== Oricon charts ===
Released	Oricon chart	Peak	Debut sales	Sales total	Chart run
November 27, 2013	Daily Singles Chart	1	116,655 (weekly)	133,058	4 weeks
November 27, 2013	Weekly Singles Chart	2	116,655 (weekly)	133,058	4 weeks
November 27, 2013	Monthly Singles Chart	4	116,655 (weekly)	133,058	4 weeks
November 27, 2013	Yearly Singles Chart	57	116,655 (weekly)	133,058	4 weeks

=== Billboard Japan charts ===
Chart (2013)	Peak position
Billboard Japan Adult Contemporary Airplay	19
Billboard Japan Hot Top Airplay	10
Billboard Japan Hot 100 Weekly	3

== Certifications ==
Region	Certification	Certified units/sales
Japan (RIAJ)	Gold	100,000^{^}
^{^} Shipments figures based on certification alone.

== Release history ==
Region	Date	Format	Label
Japan	November 27, 2013	CD; CD+DVD; digital download	Avex Trax
South Korea	November 27, 2013	Digital download	S.M. Entertainment; KT Music
Taiwan	December 20, 2013	CD; CD+DVD	Avex Taiwan
