= Ocean (TVXQ song) =

Single by Tohoshinki

from the album Tree
- B-side: "Wedding Dress"
- Released: June 12, 2013
- Recorded: 2012
- Genre: J-pop; electropop
- Label: Avex Trax
- Songwriters: Shinjiroh Inoue; White Jam
- Producer: Shinjiroh Inoue

Tohoshinki singles chronology
"Humanoids" (2012)	"Ocean" (2013)	"Scream" (2013)

"Ocean" (stylized as "OCEAN") is the 37th Japanese single by South Korean pop duo Tohoshinki. It was released on June 12, 2013 by Avex Trax as the first single from their seventh Japanese studio album, Tree (2014). Written and produced by Shinjiroh Inoue, "Ocean" was released in three editions – a CD+DVD version, a CD-only version, and a Bigeast Board edition.

The single sold 88,428 copies on its first day of release, and 116,782 copies by its second, breaking a new record for the group. "Ocean" landed at number two on the weekly Oricon Singles Chart by selling 140,872 copies, and was certified gold by the Recording Industry Association of Japan (RIAJ). Charting for over nine months, "Ocean" has reported sales of 159,163 according to the Oricon.

"Ocean" was used as the June monthly theme song for five different Japanese variety shows, which include the daytime show PON!, the music show Music Dragon (ミュージックドラゴン), the game show Sore Ike! Game Panther! (それいけ!ゲームパンサー!), and Futtonda (フットンダ). The B-side track "Wedding Dress", written by Shirose and Shimada of White Jam, was used as the theme song for BeeTV's mobile drama, The Greatest Proposal (最上のプロポーズ).

== Formats and track listings ==
- iTunes digital download
1. "OCEAN" – 5:14
2. "Wedding Dress" – 4:26
3. "OCEAN" (music video)
- CD+DVD single AVCK-79145

Disc 1 (CD)

1. "OCEAN"
2. "Wedding Dress"
3. "OCEAN" (Less Vocal)
4. "Wedding Dress" (Less Vocal)

Disc 2 (DVD)

1. "OCEAN" (Video Clip)
2. "OCEAN" (Off Shot Movie)
- CD single AVCK-79147
1. "OCEAN"
2. "Wedding Dress"
3. "OCEAN" (Rising Starr Remix)
4. "OCEAN" (Less Vocal)
5. "Wedding Dress" (Less Vocal)

== Charts ==
=== Oricon charts ===
Released	Oricon chart	Peak	Debut sales	Sales total	Chart run
June 12, 2013	Daily Singles Chart	1	140,872 (weekly)	159,163	10 weeks
June 12, 2013	Weekly Singles Chart	2	140,872 (weekly)	159,163	10 weeks
June 12, 2013	Monthly Singles Chart	5	140,872 (weekly)	159,163	10 weeks
June 12, 2013	Yearly Singles Chart	40	140,872 (weekly)	159,163	10 weeks

=== Billboard Japan charts ===
Chart (2013)	Peak position
Billboard Japan Adult Contemporary Airplay	65
Billboard Japan Hot Top Airplay	18
Billboard Japan Hot 100 Weekly	2

=== Other charts ===
Chart (2013)	Sales total
South Korean International Singles (Gaon)	3,061

== Certifications ==
Region	Certification	Certified units/sales
Japan (RIAJ)	Gold	100,000^{^}
^{^} Shipments figures based on certification alone.

== Release history ==
Region	Date	Format	Label
Japan	June 12, 2013	CD; CD+DVD; digital download	Avex Trax
South Korea	June 12, 2013	Digital download	S.M. Entertainment; KT Music
Taiwan	July 5, 2013	CD; CD+DVD	Avex Taiwan
