= Something (TVXQ song) =

- Cover for Japanese release

Single by TVXQ / Tohoshinki

from the album Tense and Tree
- A-side: "Hide & Seek" (Japan)
- Released: January 6, 2014 (KR); February 5, 2014 (JP)
- Recorded: 2013
- Genre: K-pop; J-pop; big band
- Label: SM Entertainment; Avex Trax
- Composers: Yoo Young-jin; Yoo Han-jin
- Lyricists: Yoo Young-jin (Korean); H.U.B (Japanese)

TVXQ / Tohoshinki singles chronology
| "Very Merry Xmas" (2013) | "Something" (2014) | "Hide & Seek" / "Something" (2014) |

Music video
- "Something" on YouTube

"Something" is a song by South Korean pop duo TVXQ, also known as Tohoshinki in Japan. Serving as the lead single for their seventh Korean studio album Tense (2014), the song was written by TVXQ's long-time collaborator Yoo Young-jin, co-composed and arranged by Yoo with his brother Yoo Han-jin. Introduced as TVXQ's tenth anniversary comeback single, "Something" was released by SM Entertainment on January 6, 2014. Two versions of the song exist; the original Korean-language version, and a Japanese-language version, which was released by Avex Trax as a double A-sided CD single, along with "Hide & Seek", in Japan on February 5, 2014. It served as the fourth and final single release for the duo's seventh Japanese studio album, Tree (2014). Within a week of its release, the single was certified gold by the Recording Industry Association of Japan (RIAJ) for shipments of over 100,000.

Noted for being a major musical departure from TVXQ's earlier songs, "Something" is a song that incorporates swing performance styles with modern dance-pop. The song deals with a narcissistic male protagonist who tells women that they need to have "that something" in order to attract him. The accompanying music video, filmed in early December 2013, premiered on January 1, 2014, at 6pm KST.

== Background and release ==
"Something" was composed and arranged by Yoo Young-jin and Yoo Han-jin, both who have been close collaborators with TVXQ since their debut in 2003. The Korean lyrics was written by Yoo Young-jin while the Japanese lyrics was written by H.U.B. The production credits of "Something" was first revealed in early December 2013 by the Korea Music Association, which also revealed details of four other tracks in the album. The song is described to be upbeat and jazzy with a modern twist. The lyrics deal with a narcissistic male protagonist who brags about his popularity and his endless number of female admirers. He wants to meet a woman who has "got that something" so he can have her fall in love with him.

On December 26, 2013, the day of TVXQ's tenth anniversary, "Something" was announced to be the lead single of Tense. A sixteen-second teaser trailer for its accompanying music video aired on television and other broadcasting portals in South Korea. At a press conference for TVXQ's tenth anniversary concert Time Slip, which was held at the Korea International Exhibition Center on December 26, 2013, and December 27, 2013, the duo announced that "Something" is a new musical experiment for their team. The song pursues a 1950s American big band concept, a genre that they have never explored with before.

The duo's Japanese label Avex Trax released a Japanese version of the "Something" teaser, which included an extra ten seconds of footage, on December 31, 2013. The Japanese version of "Something" was released as a double A-sided CD single, along with "Hide & Seek", in Japan on February 5, 2014. It served as TVXQ's 40th Japanese single.

== Reception ==
=== Critical ===
"Something" received attention for its raw acoustic swing jazz sounds and big band instrumental. TVXQ stated the song was made with mass appeal in mind. Primarily known for their "dark and intense" SMP music, a unique experimental genre that employs heavy contemporary R&B, rock, and hip hop beats, TVXQ were initially worried that the laid-back sounds of "Something" would garner mixed responses from fans and critics.

The song has received general acclaim from music critics. Lee Hye-rin of Osen described "Something" as "cute and lively" with "entertaining" lyrics. She welcomed TVXQ's change in musical route, commenting that it is a refreshing adjustment to the group. Other critics praised the song's raw big band sound and expressed that "Something" is one of the first K-pop idol songs to use brass instruments. "Something" came in fourth on Billboard's list of Best K-pop Songs of 2014.

=== Chart performance ===
"Something" debuted at number four on the Gaon Singles Chart. As of February 1, digital sales of "Something" have reached 383,960 copies in South Korea. In Japan, the single sold 74,040 physical copies on its first day of release, debuting at number two on the daily Oricon Singles Chart.

=== Accolades ===
On January 16, 2014, "Something" won first place on the Mnet music show, M! Countdown. It was TVXQ's fifteenth win on the show and the duo's first number-one win since "Before U Go" in 2011. On January 17, "Something" won first place on the KBS Music Bank K-Chart, and on January 18, the song won first place on MBC Show! Music Core, TVXQ's first-ever win on the show. On January 19, "Something" won its fourth accolade on SBS The Music Trend. On January 23, despite TVXQ's absence, "Something" won its second first-place trophy from M! Countdown. The show gave the song its third and last first-place trophy on January 30. On February 7, "Something" won its second and last first-place trophy from Music Bank. "Something" has won seven trophies.

Music program wins
| Program | Date | Ref. |
|---|---|---|
| M Countdown | January 16, 2014 | |
| M Countdown | January 23, 2014 | |
| M Countdown | January 30, 2014 | |
| Music Bank | January 17, 2014 | |
| Music Bank | February 7, 2014 | |
| Show! Music Core | January 18, 2014 | |
| Inkigayo | January 19, 2014 | |

== Music video ==
=== Background and synopsis ===
A teaser trailer was released on December 26, 2013, the day of TVXQ's tenth anniversary. The sixteen-second teaser showed various snippets from the actual music video, which ended with words that read "10th Anniversary – Something". The full music video premiered on TVXQ's official video-sharing channels on January 1, 2014, at 6pm KST. The video, filmed sometime in early December 2013 in Paju, took three days to shoot. It features a big band ensemble with TVXQ dancing in two different studio settings – a brightly lit opera house set and an alleyway. The outfits worn in the video include flowery and pinstriped cutaway tailcoats, wide-legged trousers, and other roaring twenties-driven pieces, some which were by Ann Demeulemeester from the spring 2014 collection. The duo closely worked with choreographer Tony Testa and performance director Hwang Sang-hoon for the song's dance choreography. Inspired by the project's period setting, they added microphones in their choreography and used them as ropes. The dance has three main points (highlights): the bass guitar strumming, the boxing ring, and the marionette dance. The duo had described the dance as "extremely difficult; defying the laws of gravity". The highly interactive dance choreography features both male and female dancers. Drawing inspirations from swing, Charleston and modern jazz dance, it also features many inversions and sliding movements.

A scene in the video where U-Know Yunho is doing the marionette dance with ropes.

The video, running five minutes and twenty-four seconds, begins with U-Know Yunho and Max Changmin appearing in a marble hallway with celestial lighting. They do a low five and snap their fingers as they walk in, leaving behind fluorescent red footprints. As they walk deeper into the hall, they pass by a portrait of three beautiful muses, who come to life to gaze at the duo.

Changing to more colorful outfits, Yunho and Changmin walk down a staircase and stop at the center of a large ballroom, standing on top of a big letter "X" – the Roman numeral for ten – that is painted on the floor. Shadows of vintage microphones hover above the duo; Yunho grabs one and the microphone lights up. Music starts and the scene changes, with TVXQ whispering "she got that something" into lit-up vintage microphones while leaning back-to-back, supported by ropes. Zooming into Yunho's elbow, the scene changes again with Changmin strumming on ropes that are set up like a large string instrument by the dancers; Yunho follows suit while a double bass instrumental arrangement plays. The music then picks up and their back-up dancers start to dance. A big band music ensemble plays behind them.

Scenes of TVXQ posing with women are interspersed throughout the video. The duo are seen seducing the women by touching their faces, brushing up their legs and fingering up their arms. Halfway into the song, the video cuts into an animated dance break, with a solo dance by each member. Bebop music is played. After the break, the band and dancers freeze. Yunho snaps his fingers and they are brought back to motion. When the song ends, the duo walk back into the marble hallway. They stop by the portrait of the muses and is enamored by the muse in the middle, who reaches out a hand. They are then pulled into the painting. The video ends with TVXQ's tenth anniversary Tense logo.

=== Reception ===
The video has received general acclaim from critics and viewers. The South Korean media described the video as being "luxurious", "vintage" and "masculine" with universal appeal. Some viewers are reminded of the glitz and glamour of Las Vegas shows, while others have compared the video's concept to The Great Gatsby and many Broadway musicals. The dynamic usage of rotoscoping and stop motion in the music video is praised, and the "line performance" is lauded for being intricate, innovative and unique, becoming the highlight of the video. The usage of big band in the video is also rated favorably.

== Live performances ==
TVXQ debuted their first live performance of "Something" on January 3, 2014, on Music Bank, and continued their comeback tour with performances on Show! Music Core and The Music Trend, respectively on January 4 and 5. On January 9, they performed "Something" for the first time on the cable show, M! Countdown. The duo had their second week of performances on South Korean music programs from January 10–12. On their third week of performances, which was from January 16–19, "Something" won first-place trophies on all four music programs. Absent on the last weekend of January, TVXQ did not perform again until February, when the duo showcased "Something" on Show! Music Core and The Music Trend on February 1 and 2, respectively. Their last week of promotional performances for "Something" fell on February 7–9, 2014.

== Formats and track listings ==
- Korean digital download
1. "Something" – 4:01
- Japanese digital download EP
1. "Hide & Seek" – 5:18
2. "Something" – 4:01
3. "Hide & Seek" (Markus Bøgelund's Audio Ninja Remix) – 4:51
4. "Hide & Seek" (Less Vocal) – 5:18
5. "Something" (Less Vocal) – 4:01
- Japanese CD+DVD single AVCK-79187/B

Disc 1 (CD)

1. "Hide & Seek"
2. "Something"
3. "Hide & Seek" (Less Vocal)
4. "Something" (Less Vocal)

Disc 2 (DVD)

1. "Something" (Video Clip)
2. Off Shot Movie (First Press Limited Edition only)
- Japanese CD single AVCK-79175
1. "Hide & Seek"
2. "Something"
3. "Hide & Seek" (Markus Bøgelund's Audio Ninja Remix)
4. "Hide & Seek" (Less Vocal)
5. "Something" (Less Vocal)
- Japanese CD single (Bigeast limited edition) AVC1-79176
1. "Hide & Seek"
2. "Something"
3. "Hide & Seek" (Less Vocal)
4. "Something" (Less Vocal)

== Charts ==
Weekly charts
| Chart (2014) | Peak position |
|---|---|
| Japan Singles (Oricon) | 2 |
| South Korea (Gaon) | 4 |
| South Korea (K-pop Hot 100) | 7 |

== Certifications ==
| Region | Certification | Certified units/sales |
|---|---|---|
| Japan (RIAJ) | Gold | 100,000^{^} |
^{^} Shipments figures based on certification alone.

== Release history ==
| Regions | Dates | Format(s) | Label(s) |
|---|---|---|---|
| Worldwide | January 6, 2014 | Digital download | SM Entertainment |
| South Korea | January 6, 2014 | Digital download | SM Entertainment; KT Music |
| Japan | February 5, 2014 | CD; CD+DVD; digital download | Avex Trax |
| Taiwan | March 7, 2014 | CD; CD+DVD | Avex Taiwan |

== Credits ==
Credits adapted from the liner notes of Tense.

=== Studio ===
- SM Booming System – recording, mixing, digital editing
- Sonic Korea – mastering

=== Personnel ===
- SM Entertainment – executive producer
- Lee Soo-man – producer
- TVXQ – vocals, background vocals
- Yoo Young-jin – producer, Korean lyrics, composition, arrangement, vocal directing, background vocals, recording, mixing, digital editing, music and sound supervisor
- H.U.B – Japanese lyrics
- Yoo Han-jin – composition, arrangement
- Sam Lee – guitar
- Kang Su-ho – drums
- Jeon Jung-sik – double bass
- Kim Dong-ha – trumpet
- Lee Han-jin – trombone
- Kim Sang-il – saxophone
- Jeon Hoon – mastering
