= Tense (album) =

Studio album by TVXQ
- Released: January 6, 2014
- Recorded: 2011–13
- Genres: K-pop; R&B; dance; neo-soul
- Length: 44:07
- Language: Korean
- Label: SM
- Producers: Hitchhiker; Hiro Doi; Hwang Hyun; Kenzie; Lee Soo-man (exec.); Yoo Young-jin

TVXQ chronology
Time (2013)	Tense (2014)	Tree (2014)

Singles from Tense
- 1. "Something" Released: January 6, 2014

Repackage edition cover
- Spellbound repackage album cover

Singles from Spellbound
- 1. "Spellbound" Released: February 27, 2014

Tense is the seventh Korean studio album (thirteenth overall) by South Korean pop duo TVXQ. It was released on January 6, 2014, by S.M. Entertainment. The record was promoted as a commemorative album for the duo's tenth debut anniversary, which fell on December 26, 2013. Tense consists of modern R&B and pop songs with components of neo-soul. Its lead single, "Something", also has elements of swing jazz with big band arrangements. Lyrically, the album references the concepts of love, courage and hope.

Tense received general acclaim from music critics, who commended the album's cohesive production and TVXQ's vocal performance. In South Korea, the album debuted at number one on the Gaon Albums Chart, giving TVXQ their third consecutive number-one since the chart's establishment in 2010. In Japan, Tense debuted at number four on the Oricon Albums Chart, making it the duo's second Korean album to enter the chart's top-five. According to the Gaon Albums Chart, Tense is the fourth best-selling Korean album of 2014, selling 196,971 physical units.

The repackage of Tense, Spellbound, was released on February 27, 2014. The repackage features three newly recorded songs, including the lead single "Spellbound". The repackage had two-day shipments of 61,405 copies and debuted at number two on the Gaon Albums Chart. It sold 110,566 physical units in 2014, becoming TVXQ's best-selling repackage album on the chart.

== Background and release ==
In November 2013, Korean news portals reported that TVXQ were close to completing the recording for their seventh Korean studio album, which was described to be a special tenth anniversary album. Their Korean agency, S.M. Entertainment, announced that the duo had recorded twenty songs for the album, and that they may consider releasing it in two parts. TVXQ called back their frequent collaborators to write and produce the project, such as Yoo Young-jin, Kenzie, and Hitchhiker. Recording sessions for Tense coincided with the duo's seventh Japanese album Tree. In December 2013 the Korea Music Association webpage revealed the details of five new songs from the record, which included "Double Trouble", "Ten (10 Year)", "Always With You", "Your Man", and the lead single "Something", produced by Yoo Young-jin.

On December 26 and 27, TVXQ held their two-day tenth anniversary concert, "Time Slip", at the Korea International Exhibition Center. At the concerts, the duo teased the new album with a performance of "Always With You", a pop-rock ballad. When introducing their new album to their fans at the concerts, Max Changmin stated that he considered Tense to be their proudest record from their catalog.

Information regarding an expanded album or a second release for Tense arose in early December 2013, when TVXQ revealed that they may separate Tense into two parts. A few weeks after Tense was released in January 2014, S.M. Entertainment disclosed in an interview that TVXQ would announce the release of a new album around mid-February 2014. Speculations of the album's repackage began circulating around social media websites in late January 2014, and the rumors claimed that the repackage would be released on February 17. On February 18, member Max Changmin confirmed that they were preparing for a new single.

TVXQ officially announced the repackage of Tense on February 20, 2014, and that "Spellbound" would be serviced as the repackage's lead single. Complementing its magical concept, a deck of collectible playing cards are also included in the album's packaging. Pre-orders officially began on February 21, 2014, and it peaked at number one on the online medium Synarra. The official music video for "Spellbound" dropped at midnight on February 27, 2014, and TVXQ debuted their first performance of "Spellbound" on February 28, 2014, on Music Bank.

== Composition ==
TVXQ called Tense an album with "unique musicality". In the album, the duo included a mix of genres that they had not experimented with before, such as swing jazz. With its focus on more mature music styles, the album steers away from TVXQ's usual electronic sound, opting for more acoustic backing. Tense has also been described as "less powerful" than their previous albums.

The concept of time and TVXQ's own tenth anniversary is referenced throughout Tense, and the titles of TVXQ's older hit singles, starting from their debut single "Hug" (2004), are used in the lyrics for the album's opening track "Ten (10 Years)". A pop song with swing and big band influences, the album's lead single "Something" is intended to be a song with mass appeal. It is noted for being a major musical departure from TVXQ's earlier songs, which had heavy R&B, rock, and hip hop attributes. Continuing with the vintage theme set off from "Something", the album's third track "Your Man" is a retro pop punk song, and the dance pop song "Moonlight Fantasy" added gospel sounds for a more harmonious effect. The R&B pop number "Off-Road" is the Korean version of the English-language song "Runnin' On Empty", a song TVXQ recorded in 2011 for the film Make Your Move 3D. U-Know Yunho also made a cameo appearance in the film, dancing to the song. Changmin wrote the lyrics for the ballad "Rise".

The repackaged album has three new songs, starting off with the lead single "Spellbound", a dance-pop song inspired by groove and funk. The second new track is Max Changmin's solo "Heaven's Day", a PBR&B track. The last new track is U-Know Yunho's solo "November with Love", a soft, mid-tempo pop ballad co-composed by Yunho and the writers of Real Man. The song also includes the backing vocals of a children's choir. "November with Love" is Yunho's first self-composed song to be included in a TVXQ studio album release.

== Release and promotion ==
On December 25, 2013, the intro page of TVXQ's official website was changed to a teaser photo for an upcoming album, which was announced to be called Tense. S.M. Entertainment confirmed that the album would be released in the traditional CD and digital mediums on January 6, 2014, and that official physical sales would begin selling on January 7, 2014. In an interview with Oh My News, it was explained that Tense represented the phrases "anxiety", "tension", and "on the edge", signifying TVXQ unwavering collectiveness and strength in their performances and music throughout the years. Tense also has a similar pronunciation to "tenth".

On December 26, 2013, the day of TVXQ's tenth debut anniversary, a sixteen-second teaser trailer for the music video of "Something", the album's first lead single, began airing on television and other broadcast media around South Korea. Through the trailers, it was announced that Tense would be released on January 6, 2014. Their official Korean website was also uploaded with an image of the album's digital cover, which was a picture of a golden coin engraved with the silhouettes of the duo. The image also included a message that thanked the fans for walking together with TVXQ in the past ten years.

Teaser pictures of the duo smartly dressed in black and white checkered suits were released to Korean media agencies throughout the week, and on December 30, a highlight medley of the songs from the album was uploaded to their official YouTube channel. Their official Korean website was also updated with a new teaser photo, and online pre-orders for the album were made available that same day. Two different covers of the album – red and black – were printed. Pre-orders peaked at number-one on various real time charts, and by December 31, pre-orders were sold out on the online medium Synarra. Selling over ten million albums in the last ten years, S.M. Entertainment published an ad of the duo's milestone, which also promoted for the upcoming release of Tense. On December 31, the Japanese version of the "Something" teaser, which includes an extra ten seconds of footage, was uploaded to Avex Trax's official YouTube account. S.M. Entertainment allegedly spent over 167.1 million won on the commercial ads.

The official music video for "Something" premiered on January 1, 2014, at 6pm KST. TVXQ debuted their first live performance of "Something" on January 3, 2014, on Music Bank, and continued their comeback tour with performances on Show! Music Core and The Music Trend, respectively on January 4 and 5.

To promote the repackaged edition of the album, TVXQ debuted their first performance of "Spellbound" on Music Bank and continued their comeback tour with performances on Show! Music Core and The Music Trend, respectively on March 1 and 2. They performed "Spellbound" on the cable shows The Show and Show Champion – TVXQ's first ever appearances on the shows – respectively on March 4 and 5, and on March 6, TVXQ debuted its only performance of "Spellbound" on M! Countdown. TVXQ completed its music show promotions by March 16. On March 24, the duo held a 3.5 hour Korail tour with 180 fans to commemorate their tenth debut anniversary and promote the record.

== Singles ==
"Something" was announced to be the lead single through a teaser that aired on December 26, 2013. The music video premiered on January 1, 2014, at 6pm KST and the song was officially released on January 6, 2014. In Japan, the Japanese version of "Something" was released as a double A-sided single with "Hide & Seek" on February 5, 2014.

"Spellbound"' (Korean: 수리수리) in Korean, was announced to be the lead single of the repackage on February 20, 2014. An upbeat dance-pop track, the production draws inspiration from soul, groove and funk. Its lyrics describe the feelings of being "spellbound" by a magical love. Its official Korean title "Surisuri", derived from the phrase "Surisuri Masuri" (Korean: 수리수리마수리), the Korean version of the incantation abracadabra.

Snippets of "Spellbound" were first featured on slideshow teasers that aired on the music shows Music Bank, Show! Music Core and The Music Trend on the weekend of February 21, 2014. At 12 p.m. KST on February 27, 2014, "Spellbound" was officially released on digital stores, coinciding with the release of the full album repackage.

== Reception ==
Professional ratings
Review scores
Source	Rating
IZM	3/5 stars

=== Critical ===
Korean music critics provided Tense with positive ratings, calling it coherently diverse and musically complete. Sticking to acoustics rather than electronic sounds, Kwon Suk-jung of Tenasia commented that the album was more mature yet less ambitious than TVXQ's earlier releases. IZM: Neo Music Community praised that Tense was the best album released by the duo, and felt that the album was "tattooed" with all the happiness and hardships that Yunho and Changmin have endured through the years. Jeff Benjamin of Billboard K-Town gave the album a favorable review, describing the project to be an album with "throwback-inspired pop and sultry R&B productions", also adding that the album would "sure to delight" even fans of Michael Jackson, Bruno Mars and general R&B fans.

=== Chart performance ===
On the first day of release, Tense debuted at number one on South Korea's digital charts. One day after release, it ranked at number one on the iTunes Stores in Japan and Vietnam, and was charted in the top 10 on the iTunes Stores of seven other countries. It also debuted at number 253 on the iTunes top album chart in the United States. According to South Korea's Hanteo Album Charts, Tense sold over 73,100 physical copies on its first week of release, debuting at number one. Tense was also the number-one K-pop album of the week in Taiwan. Demand for the album among Japanese fans was also high, with Tense debuting at number four on the Oricon Weekly album charts with sales of 13,895 imported copies.

== Track listing ==
Tense track list
No.	Title	Lyrics	Music	Arrangement	Length
1.	"Ten (10 Years)"	Yoo Young-jin	Yoo Young-jin	Yoo Young-jin	3:12
2.	"Something"	Yoo Young-jin	Yoo Young-jin; Yoo Han-jin	Yoo Young-jin; Yoo Han-jin	4:01
3.	"Your Man" (너의 남자; Neo-ui Namja)	Kenzie	Kenzie; Kim Jeong-bae	Kenzie	3:07
4.	"Moonlight Fantasy" (오늘밤; Oneulbam; lit. 'Tonight')	Jeon Gan-di	Coach & Sendo; Alexander Holmgren	Coach & Sendo; Alexander Holmgren	3:35
5.	"Beside" (그 대신 내가; Geu Daesin Naega; lit. 'Instead of Him, Let Me')	JQ (Makeumine works)	Albi Albertsson (Mussashi); Ricky Hanley; Stephan Elfgren	Mussashi	3:45
6.	"Double Trouble"	Kim Boo-min	Hitchhiker	Hitchhiker	3:44
7.	"Off-Road" (Korean version of "Runnin' On Empty")	Seo Ji-eum	Adam Nierow (Mr. Fantastic); Peter Habib (Mr. Fantastic); Marc Joseph; Yaroslav Vynnytsky	Mr. Fantastic; Mysto and Pizzi	3:32
8.	"Smoky Heart" (갈증; Galjeung; lit. 'Thirst')	Seo Ji-eum	Brian Kennedy; Dewain Whitmore	Brian Kennedy; Dewain Whitmore	3:33
9.	"Love Again"	Jang Yeon-jeong	Tesung Kim (Iconic Sounds); Andrew Choi (Iconic Sounds); Fast Lane; Sky Beatz	Sky Beatz	3:52
10.	"Steppin'" (뒷모습; Dwinmoseup; lit. 'Back View')	Jeon Gan-di	Im Kwang-wook (Devine Channel); Andrew Jackson; Martin Hoberg Hedegaard	Im Kwang-wook (Devine Channel); Andrew Jackson; Martin Hoberg Hedegaard	3:11
11.	"Rise..."	Max Changmin	Jarkko Ehnqvist; Pessi Levanto; Martin Mulholland; Deez	LeeOn	4:40
12.	"Always With You" (항상 곁에 있을게; Hangsang Gyeoche Isseulge; lit. 'Always Be By Your Side')	Hwang Hyun (MonoTree); Agnes Shin (MonoTree)	Hwang Hyun (MonoTree)	MonoTree	3:55
Total length:					44:46

Spellbound repackage track list
No.	Title	Lyrics	Music	Arrangement	Length
1.	"Spellbound" (수리수리; Surisuri; lit. 'Abracadabra')	Yoo Young-jin	Yoo Young-jin	Yoo Young-jin	4:31
2.	"Ten (10 Years)"	Yoo Young-jin	Yoo Young-jin	Yoo Young-jin	3:12
3.	"Something"	Yoo Young-jin	Yoo Young-jin; Yoo Han-jin	Yoo Young-jin; Yoo Han-jin	4:01
4.	"Your Man" (너의 남자; Neo-ui Namja)	Kenzie	Kenzie; Kim Jeong-bae	Kenzie	3:07
5.	"Moonlight Fantasy" (오늘밤; Oneulbam; lit. 'Tonight')	Jeon Gan-di	Coach & Sendo; Alexander Holmgren	Coach & Sendo; Alexander Holmgren	3:35
6.	"Beside" (그 대신 내가; Geu Daesin Naega; lit. 'Instead of Him, Let Me')	JQ (Makeumine works)	Albi Albertsson (Mussashi); Ricky Hanley; Stephan Elfgren	Mussashi	3:45
7.	"Double Trouble"	Kim Boo-min	Hitchhiker	Hitchhiker	3:44
8.	"Off-Road" (Korean version of "Runnin' On Empty")	Seo Ji-eum	Adam Nierow (Mr. Fantastic); Peter Habib (Mr. Fantastic); Marc Joseph; Yaroslav Vynnytsky	Mr. Fantastic; Mysto and Pizzi	3:32
9.	"Heaven's Day" (Max Changmin solo)	Max Changmin	Shin Hyuk (Joombas); RE:ONE (Joombas); DK (Joombas); Sean Fenton	Joombas	3:43
10.	"Smoky Heart" (갈증; Galjeung; lit. 'Thirst')	Seo Ji-eum	Brian Kennedy; Dewain Whitmore	Brian Kennedy; Dewain Whitmore	3:33
11.	"Love Again"	Jang Yeon-jeong	Tesung Kim (Iconic Sounds); Andrew Choi (Iconic Sounds); Fast Lane; Sky Beatz	Sky Beatz	3:52
12.	"Steppin'" (뒷모습; Dwinmoseup; lit. 'Back View')	Jeon Gan-di	Im Kwang-wook (Devine Channel); Andrew Jackson; Martin Hoberg Hedegaard	Im Kwang-wook (Devine Channel); Andrew Jackson; Martin Hoberg Hedegaard	3:11
13.	"Rise..."	Max Changmin	Jarkko Ehnqvist; Pessi Levanto; Martin Mulholland; Deez	LeeOn	4:40
14.	"November With Love" (11월...그리고; 11wol... Geurigo; lit. 'November... and') (U-Know Yunho solo)	U-Know Yunho; Kim Woo-joo	U-Know Yunho; Lee Oh-won (Realtrack); Yoon Sang-jo (Realtrack)	Realtrack; Boys Of Korea	4:34
15.	"Always With You" (항상 곁에 있을게; Hangsang Gyeoche Isseulge; lit. 'Always Be By Your Side')	Hwang Hyun (MonoTree); Agnes Shin (MonoTree)	Hwang Hyun (MonoTree)	MonoTree	3:55
Total length:					56:55

== Personnel ==
Credits adapted from the liner notes of Tense.

Performers and musicians

- TVXQ (Yunho, Changmin) – vocals, background vocals
- Yoo Young-jin – background vocals (tracks 1, 2)
- Kim Hyeon-ah – background vocals (tracks 2)
- Andrew Choi – background vocals (tracks 4, 5, 7, 9, 11)
- Park Ah-sul – background vocals (track 12)
- Kang Su-ho – drums (track 2)
- Jeon Sung-sik – double bass (track 2)
- Sam Lee – guitar (track 2)
- Kim Dong-ha – trumpet (tracks 2–4)
- Lee Han-jin – trombone (tracks 2–4)
- Kim Sang-il – saxophone (tracks 2–4)
- Choi Hun – bass (tracks 3, 4)
- Kim Jung-bae – guitar (track 3)
- Kenzie – piano (track 3)
- Yong – strings (tracks 3, 11)
- Jung Dae-han – organs (track 4)
- Hitchhiker – bass, guitar, keyboard (track 6)
- Im Jung-kyu – drums (tracks 11, 12)
- Kim Ki-wook – bass (track 11)
- Go Tae-young – guitar (track 11)
- Kim Min-woo – keyboard (track 11)
- Kim Byung-suk – bass (track 12)
- Kang Su-won – guitar (track 12)

Technical personnel

- Yoo Young-jin – direction, mixing, recording (tracks 1, 2)
- Kenzie – direction (track 3)
- Hitchhiker – direction, additional vocal editing (track 6)
- Hiro Doi – direction (track 9)
- Hwang Hyun – direction, additional vocal editing (tracks 10, 12)
- Yoo Ji-sang – vocal direction, vocal editing (track 4)
- Kim Jin-hwan – vocal direction (tracks 5, 8)
- Lee Jae-myung – vocal direction (tracks 5, 7, 8, 11)
- Kim Tae-sung – vocal direction (track 7)
- Lee Yun-jae – vocal direction (track 8)
- Jung Eun-kyung – additional vocal editing (track 4), recording (tracks 3, 9, 11)
- Lee Min-kyu – additional vocal editing (track 5, 7, 8, 11), recording (track 5)
- Lee Ji-hong – additional vocal editing (track 9), recording (track 11)
- Oh Sung-geun with assistant Song Ju-yong – recording (track 2)
- Kwang Jung-sin with assistant Jung Mo-yeon – recording (track 2)
- Jung Ki-hong with assistant Park Mu-il – recording (tracks 3, 4)
- Jung Wi-suk – recording (tracks 4–6, 11), mixing (tracks 5, 6, 10)
- Park Eun-jung – recording (tracks 4, 8, 10)
- Kim Hyun-gon with assistant Jang Woo-young – recording (tracks 4, 11, 12)
- Lee Sung-ho – recording (track 5)
- Goo Jong-pil – recording (tracks 5, 12), mixing (tracks 4, 8, 9)
- Nam Gung-jin – recording (tracks 7, 8, 12), mixing (tracks 3, 7, 8, 12)
- Kim Chul-soon – recording (tracks 7, 8)
- Kim Ji-eun – recording (track 10)

== Charts ==
=== Weekly charts ===
Chart performance for Tense & Spellbound
Chart (2014)	Peak position	
Chart (2014)	Tense	Spellbound
South Korean Albums (Gaon)	1	2
Japanese Albums (Oricon)	4	–
Taiwanese Albums (G-Music)	16	13
Taiwanese East Asian Albums (G-Music)	6	6
US World Albums (Billboard)	2	–

=== Monthly charts ===
Chart performance for Tense & Spellbound
Chart (2014)	Peak position	
Chart (2014)	Tense	Spellbound
South Korean Albums (Gaon)	1	3

=== Year-end charts ===
Chart performance for Tense & Spellbound
Chart (2014)	Position	
Chart (2014)	Tense	Spellbound
South Korean Albums (Gaon)	4	12

== Sales ==
Sales for Tense
Region	Chart	Sales/shipments
South Korea	Gaon Albums Chart	196,971
South Korea	Hanteo Albums Chart	159,971
Japan	Oricon Albums Chart	51,572 (with Spellbound)

Sales for Spellbound
Region	Chart	Sales/shipments
South Korea	Gaon Albums Chart	110,566
Japan	Oricon Albums Chart	51,572 (with Tense)

== Release history ==
Release formats for Tense
Region	Date	Format(s)	Label
Worldwide	January 6, 2014	Digital download	S.M. Entertainment
South Korea	January 6, 2014	CD; digital download	S.M. Entertainment
Taiwan	January 6, 2014	Digital download	Avex Taiwan
Taiwan	February 14, 2014	CD	Avex Taiwan

Release formats for Spellbound
Region	Date	Format(s)	Label
Worldwide	February 27, 2014	Digital download	S.M. Entertainment
South Korea	February 27, 2014	CD; digital download	S.M. Entertainment
Taiwan	April 2, 2014	CD	Avex Taiwan

== See also ==
- TVXQ albums discography
- List of number-one albums of 2014 (South Korea)
