= Share the World / We Are! =

Single by Tohoshinki

from the album Best Selection 2010
- Released: April 22, 2009
- Recorded: 2009
- Genre: Pop, urban-pop, electropop, synthpop, hip hop
- Label: Rhythm Zone

Tohoshinki singles chronology
| "Survivor" (2009) | "Share the World / We Are!" (2009) | "Stand by U" (2009) |

Alternative covers
- CD+DVD cover

Music video
- "Share the World" on YouTube

"Share the World / We Are!" (ウィーアー!) is Korean boy band Tohoshinki's twenty-seventh Japanese single and was released on April 22, 2009, by Rhythm Zone. This is their sixth number one single in Japan, extending the record they set back in earlier in the year with "Bolero/Kiss the Baby Sky/Wasurenaide". The single has been labeled as a "One Piece single" since all three songs on the single at some point have been used as a theme song for the anime One Piece.

== Overview ==
"Share the World / We Are!" was released nearly a month after the release of their fourth Japanese studio album The Secret Code. "We Are! (Animation One Piece 10th Anniversary Ver.)" was used as the opening theme for anime series One Piece from episodes 373 to 394. "We Are!" is a cover of the first opening by Hiroshi Kitadani. "Share the World" took the place of "We Are!" as the opening theme of the series. The single debuted at number one on the Oricon charts giving the group their sixth number one single which extends their record making them the first foreign artist to have six number one singles in Japan. The bonus track "Asu wa Kuru Kara" (明日は来るから, lit. Because Tomorrow Will Come), which was released in 2006, was used as the ending theme for the eighth and half of the ninth season of One Piece.

== Music video ==
The music video was shot by Tsuyoshi Inoue (井上強, Inoue Tsuyoshi). The video begins with Hero dusting off a book and proceeds to open it. The members appear on a wasteland where the weather changes from sunny to rainy, when the first verse begins. At the start of the chorus the scene switches to a white background and near the end the wasteland fills with water and Hero emerges from it. At the start of the second chorus they are swimming under water and near the end of the video they are flying in the sky. In the end camera zooms out and shows the globe and reveals the title of the book, Share the World.

== Live performances ==
- June 20, 2009 - Music fair 21
- July 1, 2009 - Tokudane Premium

== Track list ==
| No. | Title | Lyrics | Music | Length |
|---|---|---|---|---|
| 1. | "Share the World" | H.u.b | Kenichi Maeyamada | 3:29 |
| 2. | "We Are!" (ウィーアー！) | Shoko Fujibayashi | Kohei Tanaka | 3:37 |
| 3. | "Asu wa Kuru Kara" (明日は来るから Because Tomorrow Will Come) | Takeshi Seno, Mai Osanai | Takeshi Seno | 4:22 |
| 4. | "Share the World: Save a Remix" (CD only) | H.u.b | Kenichi Maeyamada | 3:29 |
| 5. | "Share the World (Less Vocal)" | | | 3:29 |
| 6. | "We Are! (Less Vocal)" | | | 3:37 |

DVD
| No. | Title | Length |
|---|---|---|
| 1. | "Share the World (Video Clip)" |
| 2. | "Off Shot Movie (First press only)" |

== Charts ==
| Chart | Peak position | Sales total |
|---|---|---|
| Oricon Daily Singles Chart | 1 | 58,952 |
| Oricon Weekly Singles Chart | 1 | 98,033 |
| Oricon Monthly Singles Chart | 2 | 129,225 |
