= List of TVXQ concert tours in Japan =

TVXQ concert tours in Japan
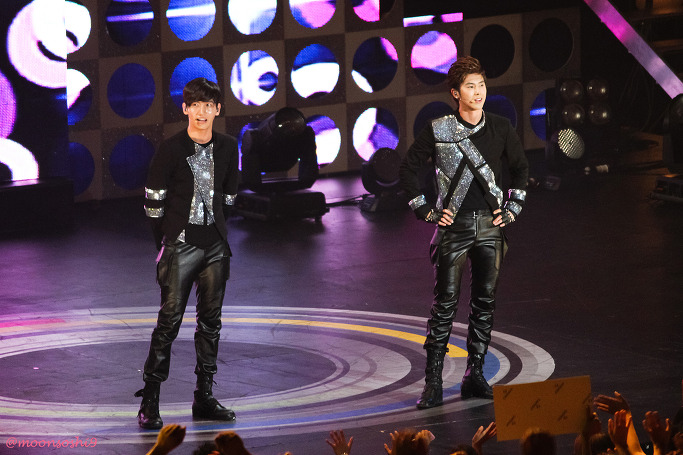
- TVXQ in September 2007
- Japan concert tours: 13
- Fan club events: 5

The South Korean pop duo TVXQ, known as Tohoshinki (東方神起, Tōhōshinki) in Japan, have embarked on twelve nation-wide concert tours. Debuting as a five-member vocal pop group in April 2005, Tohoshinki held their first Japanese tour, the Heart, Mind and Soul Tour, in 2006. This was followed by the Five in the Black Tour in 2007 and the T Tour in 2008, the latter being the group's first arena tour and bringing in an estimate of 150,000 fans from 17 shows. From May to July 2009, Tohoshinki held their fourth and last Japanese tour as a quintet, The Secret Code Tour, selling over 300,000 tickets. For the tour's finale, Tohoshinki performed in the Tokyo Dome, making them the third Korean music act, and the first Korean pop group, to do so.

After the departure of members Jejung, Yuchun, and Junsu in 2010, remaining Tohoshinki members Yunho and Changmin did not tour again until January 2012, when they held their first concert tour as a duo, titled the Tone Tour. The tour sold over 550,000 tickets in Japan and grossed over US$73 million, making it the largest overseas concert held by a Korean artist at the time. The duo broke their own record the following year with their sixth Japanese concert tour, the Time Tour, making Tohoshinki the first Korean artist to hold a dome tour in Japan. The tour's two-day finale was held at Japan's largest stadium, the Nissan Stadium, pushing the duo as the first international music act to headline a stadium concert. The Time Tour was the highest-grossing and most-attended concert tour held by a foreign music act in Japan at the time, selling over 850,000 tickets and grossing US$93 million. Tohoshinki broke that record again with their Begin Again: Live Tour in 2018, which made US$110 million from 1.28 million tickets. The finale of the Begin Again Tour was again held at the Nissan Stadium, pushing Tohoshinki as the first foreign music act to headline Nissan Stadium twice. It is the highest-grossing concert tour held by a foreign music act in Japan.

From January 2012 to June 2014, the duo performed in concerts for over 2 million people in Japan, the fastest mobilization by a non-Japanese act.

== Touring summary ==
Title	Duration	Shows	Attendance	Revenue	Ref.
Heart, Mind and Soul Live Tour 2006	May 13, 2006 – June 28, 2006	11	20,000	—	
Five in the Black Live Tour 2007	May 10, 2007 – June 19, 2007	16	70,000	—	
T: Live Tour 2008	March 19, 2008 – May 6, 2008	17	150,000	—	
The Secret Code: Live Tour 2009	May 4, 2009 – July 5, 2009	21	300,000		
Tone: Live Tour 2012	January 18, 2012 – April 23, 2012	26	550,000	$73.8 million	
Time: Live Tour 2013	April 27, 2013 – August 19, 2013	18	890,000	$92.6 million	
Tree: Live Tour 2014	April 22, 2014 – June 22, 2014	29	600,000	—	
With: Live Tour 2015	February 6, 2015 – April 2, 2015	16	750,000	—	
Begin Again: Live Tour	November 11, 2017 – June 10, 2018	20	1,005,000	—	
Tomorrow: Live Tour 2018	September 26, 2018 – January 20, 2019	33	680,000	—	
XV: Live Tour	November 9, 2019 – January 10, 2020	14	600,000	—	
Classyc: Live Tour 2023	February 11, 2023 – June 25, 2023	20	300,000	—	
Zone: 20th Anniversary Live Tour	November 29, 2024 – April 27, 2025	22	350,000	—	

== Heart, Mind and Soul: 1st Live Tour 2006 ==
Tour dates
Date	City	Venue	Attendance
May 13, 2006	Sapporo	Penny Lane 24	20,000
May 18, 2006	Osaka	Minatomachi River Place	20,000
May 20, 2006	Osaka	Minatomachi River Place	20,000
May 27, 2006	Yokohama	Yokohama Blitz	20,000
May 28, 2006	Yokohama	Yokohama Blitz	20,000
June 4, 2006	Fukuoka	Fukuoka Drum Logos	20,000
June 10, 2006	Nagoya	Diamond Hall	20,000
June 23, 2006	Niigata	Niigata Lots	20,000
June 25, 2006	Tokyo	Zepp Tokyo	20,000
June 27, 2006	Tokyo	Zepp Tokyo	20,000
June 28, 2006	Tokyo	Zepp Tokyo	20,000

== Five in the Black: 2nd Live Tour 2007 ==
Tour dates
Date	City	Venue	Attendance
May 10, 2007	Nakano	Nakano Sun Plaza	70,000
May 12, 2007	Osaka	Orix Theater	70,000
May 13, 2007	Osaka	Orix Theater	70,000
May 16, 2007	Niigata	Niigata Prefectural Civic Center	70,000
May 18, 2007	Shibuya	Shibuya Public Hall	70,000
May 19, 2007	Shibuya	Shibuya Public Hall	70,000
May 23, 2007	Sapporo	Sapporo Education and Culture Hall	70,000
May 27, 2007	Sendai	Sendai Municipal House	70,000
May 29, 2007	Kobe	Kobe International Conference Center	70,000
May 31, 2007	Otsu	Shiga Prefectural Art Theater	70,000
June 2, 2007	Aichi	Aichi Prefectural Art Theater	70,000
June 3, 2007	Aichi	Aichi Prefectural Art Theater	70,000
June 15, 2007	Fukuoka	Fukuoka Sunpalace	70,000
June 16, 2007	Fukuoka	Fukuoka Sunpalace	70,000
June 18, 2007	Tokyo	Nippon Budokan	70,000
June 19, 2007	Tokyo	Nippon Budokan	70,000

== T: 3rd Live Tour 2008 ==
Tour dates
Date	City	Venue	Attendance
March 19, 2008	Yokohama	Yokohama Arena	150,000
March 20, 2008	Yokohama	Yokohama Arena	150,000
March 26, 2008	Osaka	Osaka-jō Hall	150,000
March 27, 2008	Osaka	Osaka-jō Hall	150,000
March 29, 2008	Osaka	Osaka-jō Hall	150,000
March 30, 2008	Osaka	Osaka-jō Hall	150,000
April 1, 2008	Fukuoka	Marine Messe Fukuoka	150,000
April 12, 2008	Hiroshima	Hiroshima Green Arena	150,000
April 13, 2008	Hiroshima	Hiroshima Green Arena	150,000
April 15, 2008	Nagoya	Nippon Gaishi Hall	150,000
April 16, 2008	Nagoya	Nippon Gaishi Hall	150,000
April 19, 2008	Miyagi	Sekisui Heim Super Arena	150,000
April 20, 2008	Miyagi	Sekisui Heim Super Arena	150,000
April 26, 2008	Sapporo	Makomanai Ice Arena	150,000
May 3, 2008	Saitama	Saitama Super Arena	150,000
May 5, 2008	Saitama	Saitama Super Arena	150,000
May 6, 2008	Saitama	Saitama Super Arena	150,000

== The Secret Code: 4th Live Tour 2009 ==
Tour dates
Date	City	Venue	Attendance
May 4, 2009	Kobe	World Memorial Hall	300,000
May 5, 2009	Kobe	World Memorial Hall	300,000
May 9, 2009	Saitama	Saitama Super Arena	300,000
May 10, 2009	Saitama	Saitama Super Arena	300,000
May 16, 2009	Miyagi	Sekisui Heim Super Arena	300,000
May 17, 2009	Miyagi	Sekisui Heim Super Arena	300,000
May 23, 2009	Sapporo	Makomanai Ice Arena	300,000
May 24, 2009	Sapporo	Makomanai Ice Arena	300,000
May 30, 2009	Fukuoka	Marine Messe Fukuoka	300,000
May 31, 2009	Fukuoka	Marine Messe Fukuoka	300,000
June 6, 2009	Hiroshima	Hiroshima Green Arena	300,000
June 7, 2009	Hiroshima	Hiroshima Green Arena	300,000
June 10, 2009	Osaka	Osaka Jou Hall	300,000
June 11, 2009	Osaka	Osaka Jou Hall	300,000
June 13, 2009	Osaka	Osaka Jou Hall	300,000
June 14, 2009	Osaka	Osaka Jou Hall	300,000
June 18, 2009	Nagoya	Nippon Gaishi Hall	300,000
June 20, 2009	Nagoya	Nippon Gaishi Hall	300,000
June 21, 2009	Nagoya	Nippon Gaishi Hall	300,000
July 4, 2009	Tokyo	Tokyo Dome	300,000
July 5, 2009	Tokyo	Tokyo Dome	300,000

== Tomorrow: Live Tour 2018 ==
Tomorrow: Live Tour 2018 (stylized as Tohoshinki Live Tour 2018 〜Tomorrow〜), also known as the Tomorrow Tour, was the tenth Japanese concert tour by South Korean pop duo Tohoshinki. The tour is supported by their album Tomorrow, which was released on September 19, 2018.

On June 10, 2018, during the last concert in Nissan Stadium of Begin Again Tour, in front of 75,000 audience, Tohoshinki announced the new arena and dome tour. They are estimated to bring 640,000 fans from their 10th Japan tour with total 32 concerts. It is the band's most expansive tour since their debut. On September 27, 2018, they announce to add 1 more show in Kyocera Osaka Dome on January 20, 2019, make the tour to 33 concerts with a 680,000 audience.

Set list in Saitama
1. "Yippie Ki Yay"
2. "Showtime"
3. "Something" (Japanese version)
4. "Get Going"
5. "I Don't Know"
6. "Jungle"
7. "Electric Love"
8. "Jumon -Mirotic-" (呪文 -MIROTIC-) (Japanese version)
9. "I Love You"
10. "Telephone"
11. "Asu Wa Kuru Kara" (明日は来るから) (Tomorrow Will Surely Come) (Tomorrow version)
12. "Road"
13. "Burning Down" (Yunho solo)
14. "In a Different Life" (Japanese Version) (Changmin solo)
15. "Sakuramichi"
16. "Back To Tomorrow" (VCR)
17. "The Chance of Love" (Japanese Version)
18. "Spellbound" (Japanese Version)
19. "Jealous" (New single – release on November 21, 2018)
20. "Trigger"
21. "O – Jung Ban Hap" (Japanese version)

Encore

22. "Sweat"
23. "This Is My Love"
24. "Share the World"
25. "SHINE"
26. "Weep"
  Notes
  - During the Tokyo Dome concerts, Tohoshinki performed "Make a Change" in place of "Sakuramichi". They also performed ""Daisuki Datta" (大好きだった)" before "Weep" and "This Is My Love" after SHINE.

Tour dates
Date	City	Venue	Attendance
September 26, 2018	Saitama	Saitama Super Arena	680,000
September 27, 2018	Saitama	Saitama Super Arena	680,000
September 28, 2018	Saitama	Saitama Super Arena	680,000
October 6, 2018	Fukuoka	Marine Messe Fukuoka	680,000
October 7, 2018	Fukuoka	Marine Messe Fukuoka	680,000
October 8, 2018	Fukuoka	Marine Messe Fukuoka	680,000
October 12, 2018	Hiroshima	Hiroshima Green Arena	680,000
October 13, 2018	Hiroshima	Hiroshima Green Arena	680,000
October 14, 2018	Hiroshima	Hiroshima Green Arena	680,000
October 19, 2018	Sapporo	Makomanai Ice Arena	680,000
October 20, 2018	Sapporo	Makomanai Ice Arena	680,000
October 21, 2018	Sapporo	Makomanai Ice Arena	680,000
October 26, 2018	Echizen	Sun Dome Fukui	680,000
October 27, 2018	Echizen	Sun Dome Fukui	680,000
October 28, 2018	Echizen	Sun Dome Fukui	680,000
November 2, 2018	Niigata	Toki Messe	680,000
November 3, 2018	Niigata	Toki Messe	680,000
November 4, 2018	Niigata	Toki Messe	680,000
November 14, 2018	Nagoya	Nippon Gaishi Hall	680,000
November 15, 2018	Nagoya	Nippon Gaishi Hall	680,000
November 16, 2018	Nagoya	Nippon Gaishi Hall	680,000
November 22, 2018	Miyagi	Sekisui Heim Super Arena	680,000
November 23, 2018	Miyagi	Sekisui Heim Super Arena	680,000
November 24, 2018	Miyagi	Sekisui Heim Super Arena	680,000
December 3, 2018	Tokyo	Tokyo Dome	680,000
December 4, 2018	Tokyo	Tokyo Dome	680,000
December 11, 2018	Tokyo	Tokyo Dome	680,000
December 12, 2018	Tokyo	Tokyo Dome	680,000
December 15, 2018	Osaka	Kyocera Dome Osaka	680,000
December 16, 2018	Osaka	Kyocera Dome Osaka	680,000
January 18, 2019	Osaka	Kyocera Dome Osaka	680,000
January 19, 2019	Osaka	Kyocera Dome Osaka	680,000
January 20, 2019	Osaka	Kyocera Dome Osaka	680,000

== XV: Live Tour 2019–20 ==
XV: Live Tour 2019 (stylized as Tohoshinki Live Tour 2019 〜XV〜), also known as the XV Tour, was the eleventh Japanese concert tour by South Korean pop duo Tohoshinki. The tour was supported by their album XV, which was released on October 16, 2019. They are estimated to bring 600,000 fans from their 11th Japan tour with total 14 concerts. On January 19, 2020, they announced that they would add two more shows in Tokyo Dome on April 25–26, 2020 in commemoration of their 15th debut anniversary in Japan, which fell on April 27, 2020. However, the two shows were ultimately canceled due to the COVID-19 pandemic in Japan. The tour grossed over US$33 million.

Set list in Osaka
1. "Hello"
2. "Manipulate"
3. "Crimson Saga"
4. "Disvelocity"
5. "Six In the Morning"
6. "Master"
7. "Hot Sauce"
8. "Mekakushi" (目隠し) (Blindfold)
9. "Hotaru no Namida" (ホタルの涙) (Tears of the Firefly)
10. "Truth" (Japanese Version)
11. "My Destiny"
12. "Everyday"
13. "Yuki Furu Yoru no Barādo" (雪降る夜のバラード) (Ballad of the Night When Snow Falls)
14. "B.U.T (Be-Au-Ty)"
15. "Hide & Seek"
16. "Mirrors"
17. "Easy Mind"
18. "Hot Hot Hot"
19. "Daisuki Datta" (大好きだった) (I'm Really Love You)
20. "Guilty"
21. "Why? (Keep Your Head Down)" (Japanese version)

Encore

22. "Stay with Me Tonight"
23. "Trigger"
24. "Survivor"
25. "Choosey Lover"
26. "Summer Dream"
27. "Somebody to Love"
28. "Pay it Forward"

Tour dates
Date	City	Venue	Attendance
November 9, 2019	Fukuoka	Fukuoka Dome	600,000
November 10, 2019	Fukuoka	Fukuoka Dome	600,000
November 19, 2019	Tokyo	Tokyo Dome	600,000
November 20, 2019	Tokyo	Tokyo Dome	600,000
November 21, 2019	Tokyo	Tokyo Dome	600,000
December 14, 2019	Sapporo	Sapporo Dome	600,000
December 21, 2019	Osaka	Kyocera Dome	600,000
December 22, 2019	Osaka	Kyocera Dome	600,000
January 11, 2020	Nagoya	Nagoya Dome	600,000
January 12, 2020	Nagoya	Nagoya Dome	600,000
January 13, 2020	Nagoya	Nagoya Dome	600,000
January 17, 2020	Osaka	Kyocera Dome	600,000
January 18, 2020	Osaka	Kyocera Dome	600,000
January 19, 2020	Osaka	Kyocera Dome	600,000

== Classyc: Live Tour 2023 ==
Classyc: Live Tour 2023 (stylized as Tohoshinki Live Tour 2023 〜Classyc〜), also known as the Classyc Tour, is the twelfth Japanese concert tour by South Korean pop duo Tohoshinki.

Set list in Nagoya
1. "MAHOROBA"
2. "Sweat"
3. "Special One"
4. "The Reflex"
5. "Shinjiru Mama" (信じるまま)
6. "I Think U Know"
7. "Believe in U -Two of Us version.-"
8. "Storm Chaser"
9. "Like Snow-White"
10. "Thank U" (Yunho solo) (Japanese version)
11. "Fever" (Changmin solo) (Japanese version)
12. "Rat Tat Tat"
13. "Good Days"
14. "STILL"
15. "Epitaph -for the future-"
16. "PARALLEL PARALLEL"
17. "No Symphaty"
18. "Bolero"
19. "Rising Sun" (Remix) (Japanese version)"

Encore

20. "Clap!"
21. "UTSUROI"
22. "High Time"
23. "We Are!"
24. "Somebody to Love"
25. "With Love"
Set list in Tokyo
1. "MAHOROBA"
2. "Sweat"
3. "Special One"
4. "The Reflex"
5. "Shinjiru Mama" (信じるまま)
6. "I Think U Know"
7. "Believe in U -Two of Us version.-"
8. "Storm Chaser"
9. "Like Snow-White"
10. "Thank U" (Yunho solo) (Japanese version)
11. "Fever" (Changmin solo) (Japanese version)
12. "Dancer Introduction medley : "Refuse to Lose" / "Hello" / "Fated" / "B.U.T (Be-Au-Ty)" / "Spellbound" / "Reboot" / "Yippie Ki Yay" / "Champion"
13. "High Time / Rat Tat Tat"
14. "Hot Hot Hot"
15. "Lime & Lemon"
16. "Good Days"
17. "STILL"
18. "Spinning -Less Vocal-" Band Introduction
19. "Epitaph -for the future-"
20. "PARALLEL PARALLEL"
21. "No Symphaty"
22. "Bolero"
23. "Rising Sun" (Remix) (Japanese version)"

Encore

24. "Clap!"
25. "Ocean"
26. "We Are"
27. "Summer Dream"
28. "Somebody to Love"
29. "With Love"

Tour dates
Date	City	Venue	Attendance
February 11, 2023	Nagoya	Nippon Gaishi Hall	300,000
February 12, 2023	Nagoya	Nippon Gaishi Hall	300,000
February 23, 2023	Hiroshima	Hiroshima Green Arena	300,000
February 24, 2023	Hiroshima	Hiroshima Green Arena	300,000
March 4, 2023	Fukuoka	Marine Messe Fukuoka	300,000
March 5, 2023	Fukuoka	Marine Messe Fukuoka	300,000
March 11, 2023	Fukui	Sun Dome Fukui	300,000
March 12, 2023	Fukui	Sun Dome Fukui	300,000
April 1, 2023	Miyagi	Sekisui Heim Super Arena	300,000
April 2, 2023	Miyagi	Sekisui Heim Super Arena	300,000
April 8, 2023	Saitama	Saitama Super Arena	300,000
April 9, 2023	Saitama	Saitama Super Arena	300,000
April 22, 2023	Sapporo	Makomanai Ice Arena	300,000
April 23, 2023	Sapporo	Makomanai Ice Arena	300,000
April 29, 2023	Niigata	Toki Messe	300,000
April 30, 2023	Niigata	Toki Messe	300,000
June 17, 2023	Osaka	Kyocera Dome	300,000
June 18, 2023	Osaka	Kyocera Dome	300,000
June 24, 2023	Tokyo	Tokyo Dome	300,000
June 25, 2023	Tokyo	Tokyo Dome	300,000

== Fan club events ==
Fan club events are organized by Bigeast—the official fanclub of TVXQ in Japan—and are only for Bigeast members.

List of events
Event name	Date	City	Venue	Attendance
「Bigeast Fanclub Event 2018: The Mission IV」	March 13, 2018 (2 sessions)	Osaka	Osaka Jo Hall	—
「Bigeast Fanclub Event 2018: The Mission IV」	March 14, 2018 (2 sessions)	Osaka	Osaka Jo Hall	—
「Bigeast Fanclub Event 2018: The Mission IV」	March 16, 2018 (1 session)	Chiba	Makuhari Messe	—
「Bigeast Fanclub Event 2018: The Mission IV」	March 17, 2018 (2 sessions)	Chiba	Makuhari Messe	—
「Bigeast Fanclub Event 2018: The Mission IV」	March 18, 2018 (2 sessions)	Chiba	Makuhari Messe	—
「Bigeast Fanclub Event 2019: Tohoshinki the Garden」	April 5, 2019 (1 session)	Chiba	Makuhari Messe	—
「Bigeast Fanclub Event 2019: Tohoshinki the Garden」	April 6, 2019 (2 sessions)	Chiba	Makuhari Messe	—
「Bigeast Fanclub Event 2019: Tohoshinki the Garden」	April 7, 2019 (2 sessions)	Chiba	Makuhari Messe	—
「Bigeast Fanclub Event 2019: Tohoshinki the Garden」	April 9, 2019 (2 sessions)	Osaka	Osaka Jo Hall	—
「Bigeast Fanclub Event 2019: Tohoshinki the Garden」	April 10, 2019 (2 sessions)	Osaka	Osaka Jo Hall	—
「Bigeast Fanclub Event 2021: Tohoshinki the Garden ~Online~」	November 14, 2021	N/A	Beyond LIVE	—
「Bigeast Fanclub Event 2022: Tohoshinki the Garden ~Tours~」	May 7, 2022 (1 session)	Chiba	Makuhari Messe	—
「Bigeast Fanclub Event 2022: Tohoshinki the Garden ~Tours~」	May 8, 2022 (2 sessions)	Chiba	Makuhari Messe	—
「Bigeast Fanclub Event 2022: Tohoshinki the Garden ~Tours~」	May 17, 2022 (2 sessions)	Sapporo	Makomanai Ice Arena	—
「Bigeast Fanclub Event 2022: Tohoshinki the Garden ~Tours~」	May 18, 2022 (2 sessions)	Sapporo	Makomanai Ice Arena	Cancelled due to COVID-19 pandemic
「Bigeast Fanclub Event 2022: Tohoshinki the Garden ~Tours~」	May 21, 2022 (2 sessions)	Yokohama	Pia Arena MM	—
「Bigeast Fanclub Event 2022: Tohoshinki the Garden ~Tours~」	May 22, 2022 (2 sessions)	Yokohama	Pia Arena MM	—
「Bigeast Fanclub Event 2022: Tohoshinki the Garden ~Tours~」	June 7, 2022 (2 sessions)	Osaka	Osaka Jo Hall	—
「Bigeast Fanclub Event 2022: Tohoshinki the Garden ~Tours~」	June 8, 2022 (2 sessions)	Osaka	Osaka Jo Hall	—
「Bigeast Fanclub Event 2022: Tohoshinki the Garden ~Tours~」	June 18, 2022 (2 sessions)	Fukuoka	Marine Messe Fukuoka	—
「Bigeast Fanclub Event 2022: Tohoshinki the Garden ~Tours~」	June 19, 2022 (2 sessions)	Fukuoka	Marine Messe Fukuoka	—
「Bigeast Fanclub Event 2022: Tohoshinki the Garden ~Tours~」	June 25, 2022 (2 sessions)	Aichi	Aichi Sky Expo	—
「Bigeast Fanclub Event 2022: Tohoshinki the Garden ~Tours~」	June 26, 2022 (2 sessions)	Aichi	Aichi Sky Expo	—
「TOHOSHINKI Bigeast FANCLUB EVENT 2023 ~WHITE GARDEN~」	November 10, 2023 (1 session)	Kobe	World Memorial Hall	—
「TOHOSHINKI Bigeast FANCLUB EVENT 2023 ~WHITE GARDEN~」	November 11, 2023 (2 sessions)	Kobe	World Memorial Hall	—
「TOHOSHINKI Bigeast FANCLUB EVENT 2023 ~WHITE GARDEN~」	November 12, 2023 (2 sessions)	Kobe	World Memorial Hall	—
「TOHOSHINKI Bigeast FANCLUB EVENT 2023 ~WHITE GARDEN~」	November 25, 2023 (2 session)	Chiba	Makuhari Messe	—
「TOHOSHINKI Bigeast FANCLUB EVENT 2023 ~WHITE GARDEN~」	November 26, 2023 (2 sessions)	Chiba	Makuhari Messe	—
「TOHOSHINKI Bigeast FANCLUB EVENT 2023 ~WHITE GARDEN~」	November 27, 2023 (1 session)	Chiba	Makuhari Messe	—
「TOHOSHINKI FANCLUB EVENT Bigeastrain 2025」	November 2, 2025 (1 session)	Tokyo	Yoyogi National Gymnasium	—
「TOHOSHINKI FANCLUB EVENT Bigeastrain 2025」	November 3, 2025 (2 sessions)	Tokyo	Yoyogi National Gymnasium	—
「TOHOSHINKI FANCLUB EVENT Bigeastrain 2025」	November 22, 2025 (1 session)	Kobe	World Memorial Hall	—
「TOHOSHINKI FANCLUB EVENT Bigeastrain 2025」	November 23, 2025 (2 sessions)	Kobe	World Memorial Hall	—
「TOHOSHINKI FANCLUB EVENT Bigeastrain 2025」	November 24, 2025 (1 sessions)	Kobe	World Memorial Hall	—

== See also ==
- List of TVXQ concert tours
