= List of TVXQ concert tours =

TVXQ concert tours
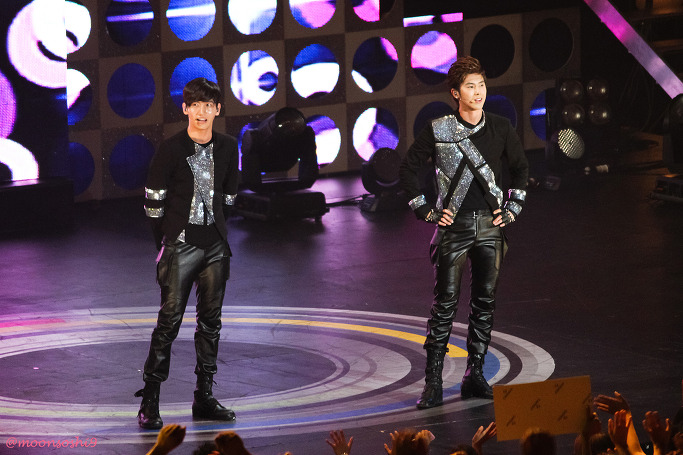
- TVXQ in May 2012
- Asia/World tours: 6
- →Japan tours: 11
- ↙Showcases: 4
- ↙Fan meetings: 3

The South Korean pop duo TVXQ have embarked on seven headlining concert tours, one of which has been worldwide, and ten others that were based exclusively in Japan. TVXQ originally debuted as a five-member group in December 2003, with members U-Know Yunho, Max Changmin, Hero Jaejoong, Micky Yoochun, and Xiah Junsu. The group made their headlining debut in February 2006 through their Rising Sun Tour, performing four sell-out shows in South Korea, one show in Thailand, and one show in Malaysia, which was the first K-pop concert held in the country. They visited China and Taiwan for the first time for their O Tour, which commenced in January 2007. Their third and last concert tour as a quinet, the Mirotic Tour, was announced to tour cities beyond South Korea, China, and Thailand throughout 2009 and 2010, but the remaining concert dates were cancelled soon after members Jaejoong, Yoochun, and Junsu entered a legal battle with their Korean agency S.M. Entertainment, subsequently leading to their departure. In January 2011, TVXQ restarted their activities as a duo, with remaining members Yunho and Changmin.

The duo held their first worldwide concert, the Catch Me: Live World Tour from November 2012 to July 2013, visiting North America and South America for the first time. In December 2014, the duo celebrated their tenth debut anniversary with the Tistory: Special Live Tour, touring cities in South Korea, China, and Thailand. It was the duo's last headlining concert tour before taking their indefinite hiatus to enlist in South Korea's compulsory military service. Since the completion of their service, TVXQ have headlined three concert tours, two of which were exclusively based in Japan. They performed in Korea, Thailand, Hong Kong, and Indonesia with the Circle – #welcome tour from May 2018 to August 2019.

TVXQ's international concert tours often overlapped with their Japanese concert tours. The duo's Japanese tours have set numerous records: they were the first Korean music act to headline a five-Dome tour, the first foreign music act to hold a concert in Japan's largest venue, the Nissan Stadium, and the first and only foreign act to attract over 1 million people on a Japanese tour. Their 2013 Time Tour was the largest, most-attended, and highest-grossing concert series ever held by a foreign music act in Japan at the time; it grossed US$93 million in concert tickets and attracted over 850,000 people. The duo set new attendance and revenue records in 2017 with their Begin Again Tour, mobilizing over 1.28 million fans and grossing US$110 million in ticket sales, as well as becoming the first and only foreign act to play at the Nissan Stadium for three consecutive days.

== Rising Sun Tour ==
Rising Sun: The 1st Concert
- Tour by TVXQ
- Associated album: Rising Sun
- Start date: February 10, 2006
- End date: September 15, 2006
- No. of shows: 4 in South Korea; 1 in Malaysia; 1 in Thailand; 6 Total

TVXQ concert chronology
- Rising Sun: 1st Concert (2006); Heart, Mind and Soul: 1st Live Tour 2006 (2006)

The 1st Concert: Rising Sun, also known as The 1st Asia Tour: Rising Sun, was the debut concert tour by South Korean pop group TVXQ, launched in support of the group's second Korean studio album, Rising Sun (2005). The tour had six dates in Asia, starting with four shows in Seoul, South Korea from February 10 to 13, 2006 at the Olympic Gymnastics Arena. The last show on February 13 was filmed and recorded for the CD and DVD release; the CD was released on July 12, 2006, and the VCD and DVD were released on January 18, 2007. The release came with additional concert and backstage footage, interviews, a behind-the-scenes making, and a 50-page photobook.

The tour's first overseas stop was in Kuala Lumpur, Malaysia on July 14, performing to 15,000 fans in the Putra Indoor Stadium. TVXQ were the first Korean music act to headline a concert in the country. Labelmates Super Junior opened the concert with a performance of their single, "U."

The Rising Sun Tour featured solo performances of each TVXQ member. Xiah Junsu performed a cover of Blue's 2001 debut single "All Rise" and invited Super Junior member Eunhyuk to perform as a guest rapper. Max Changmin covered Michael Jackson's "The Way You Make Me Feel", but due to copyright restrictions, his performance was cut off from the CD and DVD setlist.

Guest acts

- Eunhyuk (South Korea, Malaysia)
- Super Junior (Malaysia)

Setlist

Set list in Seoul
1. "Tonight"
2. "Hug"
3. "너희들것이니까 (I Wish...)"
4. "Whatever They Say"
5. "믿어요 (Believe)"
6. "Tri-Angle"
7. "Free Your Mind"
8. "Dangerous Mind"
9. U-Know Yunho solo: Dance Performance
10. Micky Yoochun solo: "여우비 (Like Weather)"
11. Max Changmin solo: "The Way You Make Me Feel"
12. "지금처럼 (Like Now)"
13. "약속했던 그때에 (Always There...)"
14. "I Never Let Go"
15. "I Wanna Hold You"
16. "마법의 성 (Magic Castle)"
17. Xiah Junsu solo: "All Rise" (featuring Eunhyuk of Super Junior)
18. Hero Jaejoong solo: "발걸음 (Footsteps)"
19. "LOVE After LOVE"
20. "넌 언제나 (You Always)"
21. "The Way U Are" (Extended version)
22. "Rising Sun" (Extended version)

Encore

23. "One"
24. "My Little Princess" (있잖아요...)
25. "Drive"

Tour dates
Date	City	Country	Venue	Attendance
February 10, 2006	Seoul	South Korea	Olympic Gymnastics Arena	40,000
February 11, 2006	Seoul	South Korea	Olympic Gymnastics Arena	40,000
February 12, 2006	Seoul	South Korea	Olympic Gymnastics Arena	40,000
February 13, 2006	Seoul	South Korea	Olympic Gymnastics Arena	40,000
July 14, 2006	Kuala Lumpur	Malaysia	Putra Indoor Stadium	15,000
September 15, 2006	Bangkok	Thailand	Impact Arena	14,000
Estimated total				69,000

== Mirotic Tour ==
The 3rd Asia Tour: Mirotic
- Tour by TVXQ
- Associated album: Mirotic
- Start date: February 20, 2009
- End date: October 2, 2009
- Legs: 4
- No. of shows: 3 in South Korea; 3 in China; 2 in Thailand; 8 Total

TVXQ concert chronology
- O: The 2nd Asia Tour (2008); 3rd Asia Tour: Mirotic (2009); Tone: Live Tour 2012 (2012)

TVXQ! The 3rd Asia Tour “Mirotic” was the third international concert tour of the South Korean pop group TVXQ!, in line with their fourth studio album, Mirotic. The tour marked the return of TVXQ! after performing the 2007-08 TVXQ! The 2nd Asia Tour Concert “O” and the final tour involving all five members of the group before the split-up. The tour commenced with 3 shows in Seoul in February 2009 and continued onto Nanjing, Bangkok, Beijing and Shanghai.

Jaejoong covered Deulgukhwa’s "It’s Only My World”, a song from 1985. Changmin performed a Christian cover song, “Upon This Rock” by Sandi Patty. “Xiahtic” was self-composed, written and arranged by Junsu specifically for his solo performance. SHINee’s Key, being a special guest, performed the rap for this song for the shows in Seoul, Nanjing, Beijing and Shanghai. In Bangkok, Yoochun took over Key’s part due to his inability to attend the concert. Yunho sung an upbeat song of his own composition, “Checkmate”, throughout the whole tour. Yoonchun also performed "Love by love", a self-composed song. On July 31, 2009, the live CD that was recorded from February 20 to 22, 2009 was first released, while the DVD was released on December 30, 2009.

“Xiahtic” and “Checkmate” were later released in Japanese as B-sides for the 29th single Break Out! and 30th single Toki Wo Tomete, respectively in 2010. Break Out! was released in Japan on January 21 and Toki Wo Tomete on March 24 as the last release of TVXQ! as a five-member group.

Setlist

Set list in Seoul

This setlist is representative of the shows in Seoul on February 20–22. It does not represent all concerts for the duration of the tour.

1. "Hey!(Don't Bring Me Down) (Rearranged) "
2. "Are You A Good Girl?"
3. "Rising Sun"
4. "Paradise"
5. "Hug (Rearranged)"
6. "Love By Love (Yoonchun Solo)"
7. "It's My World (Jaejoong Solo)"
8. "Upon This Rock (Changmin Solo)"
9. "Wrong Number"
10. "Purple Line (Dance Break Ver.)"
11. "Balloons (Rearranged)"
12. "Halfmoon"
13. "Love In The Ice (Korean Ver.)"
14. "Don't Say Goodbye"
15. "Greeting"
16. "Xiahatic ft. Key Of SHINee (Junsu Solo)"
17. "Checkmate (Yunho Solo)"
18. "Mirotic (Rearranged)"
19. "The Way U Are (Rearranged)"
20. "Somebody To Love"
21. "Crazy Love"
22. "HaHaHa Song"
23. "Sky"
24. "Song For You"
25. "Tonight"

Tour dates
Date	City	Country	Venue	Attendance
February 20, 2009	Seoul	South Korea	Olympic Gymnastics Arena	36,000
February 21, 2009	Seoul	South Korea	Olympic Gymnastics Arena	36,000
February 22, 2009	Seoul	South Korea	Olympic Gymnastics Arena	36,000
April 4, 2009	Nanjing	China	Nanjing Olympic Sports Centre	20,000
June 27, 2009	Bangkok	Thailand	Impact Arena	32,000
June 28, 2009	Bangkok	Thailand	Impact Arena	32,000
July 11, 2009	Beijing	China	Beijing Workers' Stadium	40,000
October 2, 2009	Shanghai	China	Hongkou Football Stadium	40,000
Estimated total				168,000

Note: The show at the Shenzhen Stadium in China scheduled on November 21 was cancelled due to Jaejoong, Junsu, and Yoonchun's legal dispute with SM Entertainment

== Tistory Tour ==
Tistory: Special Live Tour
- Tour by TVXQ
- Promotional poster for the tour in Seoul
- Associated album: Tense
- Start date: December 6, 2014
- End date: June 14, 2015
- No. of shows: 10

TVXQ concert chronology
- Tree: Live Tour (2014); Tistory: Special Live Tour (2014–15); With: Live Tour (2015)

Tistory: Special Live Tour (stylized as TVXQ! Special Live Tour – T1ST0RY), also known as the tenth anniversary tour, was the fifth world concert tour (twelfth overall) by South Korean pop duo TVXQ. The set list consisted of TVXQ's greatest hits. The tour was the duo's last headlining concert tour before taking their hiatus to enlist in South Korea's compulsory military service.

The name "Tistory" (T1ST0RY; pronounced "tee-story") is coined from the combination of the letter "T" (from "TVXQ") and the word "history." The "i" and "o" in the word "history" is replaced with the numbers "1" and "0" to symbolize the duo's tenth year. The concert was produced by Shim Jae-won and promoted by Dreammaker Entertainment in South Korea.

Background

TVXQ's tenth anniversary promotions started in December 2013, when they held a two-day special concert to commemorate their decade in the Korean music industry. The concert, titled Time Slip, was part of S.M. Entertainment's winter music festival SMTown Week. Time Slip was held in Seoul's Olympic Gymnastics Arena on December 26 and 27, 2013. The two encore shows were called T1ST0RY &...! and was held at the Olympic Gymnastics Arena from June 13 and 14, 2015.

Broadcasts and recordings

The first two concerts in Seoul, South Korea were filmed. The DVD, which also includes behind-the-scene footage and a 100-page photobook, was released on May 29, 2015. The final encore concert on June 14, 2015, was broadcast live at the multi-complexes S.M. COEX Artium in Seoul, South Korea and Studio Coast in Tokyo, Japan. It sold 100,000 tickets in total, grossing approximately US$4 million. The concert film was re-released at the S.M. COEX Artium with surround viewing features on July 10.

On December 26, TVXQ's twelfth anniversary, S.M. debuted the TVXQ! Special Hologram Concert 'T1ST0RY &…!’ + α at the SMTOWN Theatre. The virtual concert, which features TVXQ performing in projected screens, is approximately 35 minutes long. The set list includes "Spellbound", "Humanoids", "Catch Me", "Keep Your Head Down", "Something", and "Ten".

Set list in Seoul (2014)
1. "Catch Me"
2. "Double Trouble"
3. "Rising Sun (순수)" (Remix)
4. "그 대신 내가 (Beside)"
5. "갈증 (Smoky Heart)"
6. Max Changmin solo: "Heaven's Day"
7. "믿기 싫은 이야기 (How Can I)"
8. "Love in the Ice" (Korean version)
9. "오늘밤 (Moonlight Fantasy)"
10. "너의 남자 (Your Man)"
11. "뒷모습 (Steppin')" / "Destiny" / "Off Road"
12. "Love Again"
13. U-Know Yunho solo: "Bang"
14. Acoustic ballad medley part 1: "믿어요 (Believe)" / "My Little Princess (있잖아요...)" / "You Only Love" / "Tonight"
15. Acoustic ballad medley part 2: "낙원 (Paradise)" / "She" / "넌 나의 노래 (You're My Melody)"
16. "Rise..."
17. "Android" (Korean version) / "Humanoids"
18. "B.U.T (Be-Au-Ty)" (Korean version)
19. "I Don't Know" (Korean version)
20. "Show Me Your Love"
21. "Crazy Love"
22. "Somebody to Love" (Korean version)
23. "Something"
24. "수리수리 (Spellbound)"
25. "왜 (Keep Your Head Down)"

Encore

26. "Ten (10 Years)"
27. "Here I Stand"
28. "항상 곁에 있을게 (Always With You)"
Encore set list in Seoul (2015)
1. "Catch Me"
2. "Maximum"
3. "Rising Sun (순수)" (Remix)
4. "그 대신 내가 (Beside)"
5. "갈증 (Smoky Heart)"
6. Max Changmin solo: "Heaven's Day"^{[A]}
7. "믿기 싫은 이야기 (How Can I)"
8. "Love in the Ice" (Korean version)
9. "오늘밤 (Moonlight Fantasy)"
10. "너의 남자 (Your Man)"
11. "뒷모습 (Steppin')" / "Destiny" / "Off Road"
12. "Love Again"
13. U-Know Yunho solo: "Champagne"
14. Acoustic ballad medley part 1: "믿어요 (Believe)" / "My Little Princess (있잖아요...)" / "You Only Love" / "Tonight"
15. Acoustic ballad medley part 2: "Drive" / "Hi Ya Ya" / "The Way U Are" / "넌 나의 노래 (You're My Melody)"
16. "Starlight"
17. "Rise..."
18. "Android" (Korean version) / "Humanoids"
19. "O-Jung.Ban.Hap."
20. "Mirotic"
21. "Crazy Love"
22. "Balloons"
23. "Somebody to Love" (Korean version)
24. "Something"
25. "수리수리 (Spellbound)"
26. "왜 (Keep Your Head Down)"

Encore

27. "Ten (10 Years)"
28. "Here I Stand"
29. "항상 곁에 있을게 (Always With You)"

Double encore

30. "Hug"

Notes

- A In the last two encore performances for Seoul, Donghae & Eunhyuk joined Changmin on stage for the show on June 13. EXO members Xiumin, Chen, and Baekhyun were the guest performers on June 14.

Tour dates
Date	City	Country	Venue	Attendance
December 6, 2014	Seoul	South Korea	Olympic Gymnastics Arena	24,000
December 7, 2014	Seoul	South Korea	Olympic Gymnastics Arena	24,000
December 13, 2014	Taipei	Taiwan	Taipei Arena	8,000
December 19, 2014	Beijing	China	MasterCard Center	—N/a
January 24, 2015	Shanghai	China	Mercedes-Benz Arena	10,000
April 25, 2015	Shenzhen	China	Shenzhen Bay Sports Center	—N/a
April 26, 2015	Shenzhen	China	Shenzhen Bay Sports Center	—N/a
May 30, 2015	Bangkok	Thailand	Impact Arena	—N/a
June 13, 2015	Seoul	South Korea	Olympic Gymnastics Arena	24,000
June 14, 2015	Seoul	South Korea	Olympic Gymnastics Arena	24,000
Estimated total				97,000

== Circle Tour ==
Circle Tour
- Tour by TVXQ
- Promotional poster for the first concert in Seoul
- Associated albums: New Chapter series (Note: New Chapter No. 1: The Chance of Love (2018); New Chapter No. 2: The Truth of Love (2018))
- Start date: May 5, 2018
- End date: September 7, 2019
- No. of shows: 10

TVXQ concert chronology
- Begin Again: Live Tour (2017–18); Circle Tour (2018–19); Tomorrow: Live Tour (2018–19)

The Circle Tour was the sixth concert tour (fourteenth overall) by the South Korean pop duo TVXQ, in support of their New Chapter album series, The Chance of Love and The Truth of Love (2018). The tour's first concert, Circle – #welcome debuted with two shows at the Jamsil Supplementary Stadium in Seoul, South Korea on May 5 and 6, 2018. It went on to tour Hong Kong, China and Bangkok, Thailand. In celebration of the duo's fifteenth debut anniversary in South Korea, the encore concert series titled Circle – #with opened with two shows in Seoul at the KSPO Dome on March 9 and 10, 2019. The tour proceeded to have four more shows in Hong Kong, Bangkok, Jakarta, Indonesia, and Taipei, Taiwan.

On April 30, 2019, TVXQ announced a date for Manila, Philippines, their first performance in the country, with the show to be held at the SM Mall of Asia Arena. Less than a month before the scheduled show, tour organizers Pulp Live World announced that the show had been canceled due to technical difficulties.

The tour's debut shows in Seoul were recorded as a concert film on DVD. The TVXQ! Concert Circle – #welcome DVD was released on March 27, 2019. A concert photobook shot during their Seoul stops for the encore tour was released on October 31, 2019.

=== Set list ===
Set list in Seoul for #welcome (May 5, 2018)
1. "Bounce"
2. "Something"
3. "Top of the World"
4. "The Way U Are"
5. "Love Line"
6. "Sun & Rain"
7. "Puzzle" (U-Know Yunho solo)
8. "The Chance of Love"
9. "Spellbound"
10. "Broken"
11. "Before U Go"
12. "Lazybones"
13. "I Believe"
14. "Without You"
15. "Closer" (Max Changmin solo)
16. "Vertigo"
17. "Mirotic"
18. "Wake Me Up"
19. "Hug"
20. "Balloons"
21. "Dream"
22. "Maximum"
23. "B.U.T (Be-Au-Ty)" (Korean version)
24. "Keep Your Head Down"
25. "Rising Sun"

Encore

26. "Hi Ya Ya Yeolreumnal"
27. "Somebody to Love" (Korean version)
28. "You're My Melody"
Set list in Seoul for #with (March 9, 2019)
1. "Bounce"
2. "Something"
3. "Top of the World"
4. "Truth"
5. "Love Line"
6. "Tonight"
7. "City Lights" (U-Know Yunho solo)
8. "The Chance of Love"
9. "Sooner Than Later"
10. "Before U Go"
11. "Lazybones"
12. "I Believe"
13. "Without You"
14. "Beautiful Stranger" (Max Changmin solo)
15. "Vertigo"
16. "Mirotic"
17. "Wake Me Up"
18. "Hug"
19. "Balloons"
20. "Dream"
21. "Maximum"
22. "Keep Your Head Down"
23. "Rising Sun"

Encore

24. "Morning Sun"
25. "Hi Ya Ya Yeolreumnal"
26. "Circle"

=== Tour dates ===
Tour dates
Date	City	Country	Venue	Attendance
Circle – #welcome
May 5, 2018	Seoul	South Korea	Jamsil Supplementary Stadium	22,000
May 6, 2018	Seoul	South Korea	Jamsil Supplementary Stadium	22,000
July 7, 2018	Hong Kong	China	AsiaWorld–Arena	8,000
August 17, 2018	Bangkok	Thailand	Impact Arena	8,000
Circle – #with
March 9, 2019	Seoul	South Korea	KSPO Dome	20,000
March 10, 2019	Seoul	South Korea	KSPO Dome	20,000
June 29, 2019	Bangkok	Thailand	Impact Arena	8,000
July 20, 2019	Hong Kong	China	AsiaWorld–Arena	9,000
August 31, 2019	Jakarta	Indonesia	Indonesia Convention Exhibition	8,000
September 7, 2019	New Taipei City	Taiwan	Xinzhuang Gymnasium	5,200
Estimated total				88,200

Cancelled shows

Date	City	Country	Venue
July 13, 2019	Manila	Philippines	SM Mall of Asia Arena

== 20&2 Asia Tour ==
20&2 Asia Tour
- Tour by TVXQ
- Promotional poster for the Seoul concert
- Location: Asia
- Associated album: 20&2
- Start date: December 30, 2023
- End date: April 20, 2024
- No. of shows: 7

TVXQ concert chronology
- Classyc: Live Tour (2023); 20&2 Tour (2023–2024); ...

The 20&2 Asia Tour, also known as the twentieth anniversary tour, was the seventh concert tour (eighteenth overall) by South Korean pop duo TVXQ. Consisting of seven shows across Asia, the tour commenced on December 30, 2023 in Seoul, South Korea, and concluded on April 20, 2024 in Jakarta, Indonesia. Announced prior to the release of their ninth studio album 20&2, the tour celebrated the duo's twentieth debut anniversary in the Korean music industry.

On November 14, 2023, TVXQ announced through social media that they would hold their 20th anniversary comeback concert at the Inspire Arena in Incheon, Seoul, titled the 20&2 Concert. TVXQ were the second artist to perform at the new venue, which was specifically designed for live events. On January 10, 2024, TVXQ announced that they would expand the concert across Asia, with stops in Hong Kong, China, Bangkok, Thailand and Taipei, Taiwan. On February 5, 2024, they added two more dates for Macau, China and Jakarta, Indonesia.

=== Set list ===
Set list in Seoul (2023)
1. "Rising Sun"
2. "Jungle"
3. "The Chance of Love"
4. "Devil" (Max Changmin solo)
5. "Wrong Number"
6. "Down"
7. "Rodeo"
8. "Keep Your Head Down"
9. "Purple Line"
10. "Vuja De" (U-Know Yunho solo)
11. "Something"
12. "Life's a Dance"
13. "The Way U Are" (Unplugged version)
14. "I'll Be There"
15. "I Wanna Hold You"
16. "I Believe"
17. "Hug"
18. "Drive"
19. "Crazy Love"
20. "Balloons"
21. "Mirotic"
22. "Rebel"

Encore

23. "Love in the Ice"
24. "Thanks To"
25. "Always With You"
26. "I Wish..."
27. "You're My Miracle"
28. "Catch Me"

=== Tour dates ===
Tour dates
Date	City	Country	Venue	Attendance
December 30, 2023	Incheon	South Korea	Inspire Arena	—
December 31, 2023	Incheon	South Korea	Inspire Arena	—
January 13, 2024	Hong Kong	China	AsiaWorld–Expo	—
February 3, 2024	Bangkok	Thailand	Union Hall 2, Union Mall	—
February 24, 2024	Taoyuan	Taiwan	NTSU Arena	—
March 30, 2024	Macau	China	The Londoner Arena	—
April 20, 2024	Jakarta	Indonesia	ICE BSD City Hall 5	—
Estimated total				N/A

== Showcases ==
=== Rising Sun Showcase ===
Date	City	Venue	Attendance
September 10, 2005	Seoul	Seoul Olympic Stadium	50,000

=== The 3rd Album "O"-Jung.Ban.Hap. Showcase ===
Date	City	Venue	Attendance
September 30, 2006	Seoul	Seoul Olympic Stadium	40,000

=== Giving Young Adults Dreams And Hope- "TVXQ’s Fall Mini Concert" ===
Date	City	Venue	Attendance
September 21, 2008	Seoul	Seoul City Hall Plaza	25,000

=== TVXQ! Welcome Back Party "The Chance Of Love" ===
Date	City	Venue	Attendance
March 28, 2018	Seoul	Blue Square Concert Hall	1,100

== Fan meetings ==
=== Cassiopeia Special Day With TVXQ ===
Date	City	Venue
January 20, 2008 (Twice)	Seoul	Olympic Gymnastics Arena

=== 5th Anniversary Special Party ===
Date	City	Venue
December 26, 2008	Seoul	Korea University Gymnasium

=== Cassiopeia Special Day With TVXQ 2013 ===
Date	City	Venue
October 5, 2013	Seoul	Korea University Gymnasium

=== TVXQ Special Day – The Truth of Love ===
Date	City	Venue
December 26, 2018	Seoul	Korea University Gymnasium

== TVXQ! Special Comeback Live – YouR PresenT ==
Setlist
1. "Something
2. "Mirotic
3. "너의 남자 (Your Man)
4. "Here I Stand
5. "In a Different Life
6. "How Can I (믿기 싫은 이야기)
7. "항상 곁에 있을게 (Always With You)
8. "넌 나의 노래 (You’re My Melody)
9. "Drop
10. "I Don’t Know
11. "Why? Keep Your Head Down

Encore

1. "Catch Me
2. "Rise

Show dates
Date	City	Country	Venue
September 30, 2017	Seoul	South Korea	Jamsil Arena
October 1, 2017	Seoul	South Korea	Jamsil Arena
October 15, 2017	Macau	China	Studio City Event Center
