= Jealous (TVXQ song) =

Single by Tohoshinki

from the album XV
- B-side: "Daisuki Datta"
- Released: November 21, 2018 (release history)
- Studio: 2018; Avex Studio Azabu (Tokyo, Japan)
- Genre: J-pop; dance
- Length: 3:16
- Label: Avex Trax
- Songwriters: Chris Wahle; Didrik Thott; Chris Meyer; H.U.B.
- Producer: Chris Wahle

Tohoshinki singles chronology
| "Road" (2018) | "Jealous" (2018) | "Truth" (2018) |

Music video
- "Jealous" on YouTube

"Jealous" is the 46th Japanese single by South Korean pop duo Tohoshinki, released by Avex Trax on November 21, 2018 as the lead single for Tohoshinki's tenth studio album XV (2019). It was released in three versions – a standard CD single, a limited CD single with a photobook, and a fan club edition exclusively for Tohoshinki's Japanese fan club, Bigeast. The B-side is "Daisuki Datta" (大好きだった), theme song to the 2018 anime Yo-kai Watch: Forever Friends.

"Jealous" was written by Chris Wahle, Didrik Thott, and Chris Meyer, with lyrics by H.U.B. Production was led by Wahle. Tohoshinki premiered a performance of the song at the Saitama Super Arena, the first leg of their Tomorrow Tour on September 26, 2018. Its accompanying music video was released YouTube on October 31, 2018.

The single was a commercial success in Japan, being certified gold by the Recording Industry Association of Japan. It debuted at number one on the Oricon Singles Chart, their first number one single since "Catch Me -If you wanna-" (2013).

== Background and release ==
"Jealous" was written by Chris Wahle, Didrik Thott, and Chris Meyer with lyrics by Tohoshinki's frequent collaborator H.U.B. Production was led by Wahle. Tohoshinki performed "Jealous" for the first time in September 2018, on the opening day of their Tomorrow Tour in the Saitama Super Arena. The name of the single was not announced until October 1, 2018. Aside from a standard CD single and an exclusive fanclub edition, the third version included a 24-page booklet that was only made available in first press limited releases.

On October 17, the song was released on Hiroshima FM's GOOD JOG +. Tohoshinki also appeared on the program to promote the single. On October 25, Tohoshinki dropped the single's jacket photos via their official website. Japanese morning publications were the first to break the news that the single's B-side "Daisuki Datta" (大好きだった) would be the theme song to the 2018 anime film Yo-kai Watch: Forever Friends. According to the film's director Shigeru Takahashi, Tohoshinki was chosen for the theme song because of their wide appeal across generations. At its core, Yo-kai Watch is a film about friends and family. Tohoshinki promoted "Daisuki Datta" on the Japanese morning program HayaDOKI. On October 31, Tohoshinki dropped the "Jealous" music video on YouTube. Behind-the-scenes footage was aired on HayaDOKI, Oya!4, BARI Haya! ZIP!, Mezamashi and Asadesu that same day. JIJI Press shared a longer version of the filming process on November 1.

The CD single was officially released on November 21, 2018.

== Commercial performance ==
The song entered the Billboard Japan Hot 100 at number 78, two weeks ahead of its release. On its fifth week on the chart, "Jealous" peaked at number three and topped the Billboard Top Single Sales. It entered the Billboard Japan Download Songs chart at number three. On December 1, "Jealous" topped song the CDTV's This Week Top 10 chart and TV Tokyo's Japan Countdown chart.

According to the Oricon, "Jealous" debuted at number one on the Oricon Singles Chart, Tohoshinki's 13th single to top the charts, and their first number one on the chart since "Catch Me -If you wanna-" (2013), and sold 91,056 physical copies on its first week. "Jealous" sold over 110,000 copies by the end of 2018 and was certified gold by the RIAJ.

The release of "Jealous" broke three Oricon records: it was Tohoshinki's 13th single to top the charts, putting Tohoshinki as the foreign artist with the most number one singles in Japan. With the single, Tohoshinki had set a new record for having the most singles by a foreign artist to enter the Oricon top ten. "Jealous" was Tohoshinki's 38th single to do so. With "Jealous," Tohoshinki sold over 4.5 million singles in Japan, the most by any foreign artist.

== Live performances ==
Tohoshinki performed "Jealous" at their nationwide Tomorrow Tour, which lasted from September 2018 to January 2019. On August 18, 2019, Tohoshinki performed "Jealous" at the a-nation Music Festival, which they headlined at the Yanmar Stadium Nagai in Osaka.

== Formats and track listings ==
- Digital download EP
1. "Jealous" – 3:16
2. "Daisuki Datta" (大好きだった) – 4:43
3. "Jealous" (Less Vocal) – 3:16
4. "Daisuki Datta" (大好きだった) (Less Vocal) – 4:43

CD single AVCK-79511 (Limited), AVCK-79512, AVC1-79513 (Bigeast)

1. "Jealous"
2. "Daisuki Datta" (大好きだった)
3. "Jealous" (Less Vocal)
4. "Daisuki Datta" (大好きだった) (Less Vocal)

== Charts ==
| Chart (2018) | Peak position |
|---|---|
| Japan (Oricon Singles Chart) | 1 |
| Billboard Japan Hot 100 | 3 |
| Billboard Top Single Sales | 1 |
| Billboard Japan Download Songs | 3 |

=== Sales ===
| Released | Oricon chart | Peak | Debut sales | Sales total |
|---|---|---|---|---|
| November 21, 2018 | Daily Singles Chart | 1 | 63,480 | 101,649 |
| November 21, 2018 | Weekly Singles Chart | 1 | 91,056 | 101,649 |
| November 21, 2018 | Monthly Singles Chart (November) | 4 | 94,649 | 101,649 |
| November 21, 2018 | Yearly Singles Chart (2018) | 69 | —N/a | 101,649 |

== Certifications ==
| Region | Certification | Certified units/sales |
|---|---|---|
| Japan (RIAJ) | Gold | 100,000^{^} |
^{^} Shipments figures based on certification alone.

== Release history ==
| Region | Date | Format | Label |
|---|---|---|---|
| Worldwide | November 21, 2018 | Digital download on iTunes Store | Avex Entertainment |
| Japan | November 21, 2018 | CD; digital download | Avex Trax |
| South Korea | November 21, 2018 | Digital download | S.M. Entertainment |
| Taiwan | December 12, 2018 | Digital download | Avex Taiwan |
| Taiwan | December 21, 2018 | CD single | Avex Taiwan |
