= The Chance of Love =

2018 TVXQ song

Single by TVXQ

from the album New Chapter No. 1: The Chance of Love
- Language: Korean (original)
- Released: March 28, 2018
- Recorded: 2018
- Genre: Dance-pop; swing
- Length: 3:27
- Label: SM; iRiver; Avex Trax
- Composers: Jihad Rahmouni; Lorenzo Fragola; Haris Alagic; Yoo Young-jin
- Lyricist: Yoo Young-jin
- Producers: Jihad Rahmouni; Haris Alagic; Yoo Young-jin

TVXQ singles chronology
"Reboot" (2017)	"The Chance of Love" (2018)	"Road" (2018)

Music video
- "The Chance of Love" on YouTube

"The Chance of Love" (Korean: 운명; RR: Unmyeong; Japanese: 運命, Unmei, lit. 'Fate') is a song recorded by South Korean duo TVXQ. It was released through SM Entertainment on March 28, 2018, as the lead single from their eighth studio album New Chapter No. 1: The Chance of Love (2018). It was the duo's first Korean single after serving two years in the Republic of Korea Armed Forces from 2015 to 2017.

Written and produced by their longtime collaborator Yoo Young-jin, "The Chance of Love" is an electro swing pop song with R&B elements, similar to TVXQ's previous single "Something" (2014). The lyrics focus on the feelings of love at first sight and destiny. The accompanying music video was released on the day of the album's release.

"The Chance of Love" was re-recorded to Japanese and released as a track on the duo's ninth Japanese album Tomorrow (2018).

== Background and release ==
On August 21, 2017, three days after Max Changmin's discharge from the Korean army, TVXQ held a press conference announcing their official comeback. They stated that they had already started working on new material for an upcoming album, which they recorded during breaks from their military services. New Chapter No. 1: The Chance of Love, the first of a duology, was announced on March 16, 2018. The first two music video teasers for "The Chance of Love," featuring U-Know Yunho and Changmin separately, were released on March 23. The music video teaser was released on March 24, confirming the song to be the album's lead single. It was formally released on March 28, 2018, alongside the album.

"The Chance of Love", written by TVXQ's longtime collaborator Yoo Young-jin is described as a "electro swing" R&B song by Billboard and a "swing jazz" dance song by The Korea Herald. The success of TVXQ's previous jazz-fusion song "Something" (2014) has inspired TVXQ to pursue a similar "musical-like" performance number as their lead single. Despite comparisons to "Something", Yunho described "The Chance of Love" as more catchy and sophisticated, with a sense of maturity that represents TVXQ's standing as 15-year K-pop veterans. He also stated, "The song's addictive hook is the focal point. Even if you listen to it ever so slightly, the song is attractive enough to capture your ears."

Veering from the duo's previous works that centered on explosive performances with aggressive lyrics, "The Chance of Love" is a song that centers on love at first sight, while also sending a message that TVXQ are "destined" or "fated" to be with each other and their fans.

"The Chance of Love" debuted at number 36 on the Gaon Digital Chart, and peaked at number 30. The music video was directed by Rigend Film.

== Promotion ==
TVXQ debuted their performance of "The Chance of Love" on Mnet's music program M Countdown on March 29, 2018, followed by KBS's Music Bank on March 30, MBC's Show! Music Core on March 31, and SBS's Inkigayo on April 1. They promoted the song again for a second time two weeks later on the same music programs, from April 12 to 15.

== Charts ==
Weekly charts
Chart (2018)	Peak position
South Korea (Gaon)	30

== Credits ==
Credits adapted from the album's liner notes.

Studio

- SM Booming System – recording, digital editing, engineered for mix, mixing
- Sonic Korea – mastering

Personnel

- SM Entertainment – executive producer
- Lee Soo-man – producer
- TVXQ – vocals
- Yoo Young-jin – producer, lyrics, composition, arrangement, vocal directing, background vocals, recording, digital editing, engineered for mix, mixing, music and sound supervisor
- Jihad Rahmouni – producer, composition, arrangement
- Lorenzo Fragola – composition, arrangement
- Haris Alagic – producer, composition, arrangement
- Jeon Hoon – mastering
