= Fine Collection: Begin Again =

Fine Collection 〜Begin Again〜

Greatest hits album by Tohoshinki
- Released: October 25, 2017
- Recorded: 2011 – 2017
- Genre: J-pop, dance-pop
- Language: Japanese
- Label: Avex Trax
- Producer: Max Matsuura; Lee Soo-man

Tohoshinki chronology
Two of Us (2016)	Fine Collection 〜Begin Again〜 (2017)	New Chapter No. 1: The Chance of Love (2018)

Fine Collection: Begin Again (stylized FINE COLLECTION 〜Begin Again〜) is the second Japanese greatest hits album by South Korean pop duo Tohoshinki. It was released on October 25, 2017, through Avex Trax as a complementary album for their comeback Japanese concert the Begin Again Tour, the duo's first tour since completing their military service. The album mainly contains singles released by Tohoshinki since 2011, including tracks from the albums Tone (2011), Time (2013), Tree (2014), and With (2015). The album also includes three re-recorded versions of earlier singles.

Begin Again was first announced by Avex Trax in August 2017 and was released in four physical versions: Version A, a CD+Blu-ray version which includes 23 music video clips; Version B, a CD+DVD version which also includes 23 music video clips; Version C, a CD-only version; and Version D, a fan club limited edition that includes exclusive footage from the concert.

The album was a commercial success, debuting at number one on the Billboard Japan Top Albums Chart and the Oricon Albums Chart, selling 130,000 copies on the first week of release. In doing so, Tohoshinki became the foreign act with the most number one albums in Japan. Begin Again has earned a gold certification by the Recording Industry Association of Japan (RIAJ) for shipments of over 100,000 copies.

== Background and release ==
The album was put in production soon after Tohoshinki's discharges from the Republic of Korea Armed Forces in late 2017. The songs "Rising Sun" (2006), "Dōshite Kimi o Suki ni Natte Shimattandarō?" (2008), and "Bolero" (2009), numbers the duo performed in their last concert tour With Tour (2015), were re-recorded for the album. Begin Again, a title inspired by Tohoshinki's 2006 single "Begin" (Five in the Black), was announced on August 22, 2017, through their official Avex Trax website. The album was marked as a commemorative and complementary release for the duo's comeback concert tour, Begin Again. To promote the album, Meet & Greet tickets were attached to each album, and buyers had to register their serial numbers through Tohoshinki's official website to be chosen. 220 fans were chosen for the Meet & Greet events, which were held at each Begin Again tour venue.

== Commercial performance ==
According to statistics compiled by Japan's Oricon, Begin Again topped the daily Oricon Albums Chart on its first day of release, selling 81,791 copies. It stayed on top of the daily Oricon Albums Chart the next three days, selling an additional 40,449 copies. By the end of the week, Begin Again sold 134,447 copies and was the number one album of the week. Begin Again also debuted atop the Billboard Japan Top Albums Chart and Japan Hot Albums chart. It ranked third on the Billboard Japan Albums Download Chart.

Begin Again is the duo's sixth consecutive record to top the Oricon Albums Chart, breaking Simon & Garfunkel and Bon Jovi's record as the foreign male music act with the most consecutive number-one albums in Japan. Tohoshinki are also the first foreign music act in Japan to top the weekly Oricon Albums Chart six times.

== Track listing ==
Fine Collection 〜Begin Again〜 (All versions) – Disc 1 (CD)
No.	Title	Lyrics	Music	Length
1.	"Why? (Keep Your Head Down)" (from Tone)	Luna	Yoo Young-jin*Yoo Han-jin
2.	"B.U.T (Be-Au-Ty)" (from Tone)	Luna	Yoo Young-jin*Ryan Jhun*Antwann Frost
3.	"Humanoids" (from Time)	H.U.B.	Thomas Troelsen*Donald "hAZEL "Sales
4.	"Maximum" (from Tone)	H.U.B.	Yoo Young-jin
5.	"Catch Me -If You Wanna-" (from Time)	H.U.B.	Yoo Young-jin
6.	"Spinning" (from With)	H.U.B.	Lubo Slavicek*Katerina Bramey*Ninos Hanna
7.	"Something" (from Tree)	H.U.B.	Yoo Young-jin
8.	"Superstar" (from Tone)	Luna	Lars Halvor Jensen*Johannes Joergensen*Drew Ryan Scott*Lindy Robbins
9.	"Ocean" (from Tree)	Shinjiroh Inoue	Shinjiroh Inoue*White Jam
10.	"I Don't Know"	Luna	Hitchhiker
11.	"Sweat" (from With)	H.U.B.	Hanif Sabzevari*Kevin Borg*Nicklas Eklund
12.	"Android" (from Time)	H.U.B.	Anders Grahn*Grace Tither*Emil Carlin
13.	"Scream" (from Tree)	H.U.B	hitchhiker
14.	"Rising Sun" (Re-recorded, from Heart, Mind and Soul)	m.c.A・T	Yoo Young-jin

Fine Collection 〜Begin Again〜 (All versions) – Disc 2 (CD)
No.	Title	Lyrics	Music	Length
1.	"Duet" (from Tone)	Inoue	Inoue
2.	"One More Thing" (from Time)	H.U.B.	her0ism
3.	"Weep" (from Tone)	Inoue	solaya
4.	"White"	Inoue	Inoue
5.	"Telephone" (from Tone)	Luna	Yoo Young-jin
6.	"Spinning" (from With)	H.U.B.	Lubo Slavicek; Ninos Hanna; Katerina Bramley
7.	"Aitakute Aitakute Tamaranai (逢いたくて逢いたくてたまらない)" (from Time)	Inoue	Inoue
8.	"Time Works Wonders" (from With)	Inoue	Peter Gordeno; Jamie Hartman
9.	"Cheering" (from Tree)	Inoue	Inoue
10.	"In Our Time" (from Time)	Inoue	Inoue
11.	"Thank You My Girl" (from Tone)	Luna	John Paul Lam; Tony Oh; Akil Thompson
12.	"Believe in U" (from With)	Inoue	Inoue
13.	"Dōshite Kimi o Suki ni Natte Shimattandarō? (どうして君を好きになってしまったんだろう？)" (Re-recorded from The Secret Code)	Lambsey	Fredrik "Fredro" Odesjo; Sylvia Bennett-Smith; Mats Berntoft

Fine Collection 〜Begin Again〜 (All versions) – Disc 3 (CD)
No.	Title	Lyrics	Music	Length
1.	"Shiawase Iro no Hana (シアワセ色の花)" (from Tone)	Katsuhiko Yamamoto	Katsuhiko Yamamoto
2.	"Sakuramichi (サクラミチ)"	Yamamoto	Yamamoto
3.	"Chandelier" (from With)	H.U.B.	Matthew Tishler; Andrew Underberg
4.	"Kimi no Inai Yoru (君のいない夜)"	Yamamoto	Yamamoto
5.	"I Love You" (from Tree)	Yamamoto	Yamamoto
6.	"With Love" (from With)	Inoue	Inoue
7.	"I Know" (from Time)	Inoue	T-SK; Tesung Kim; Andrew Choi
8.	"Still" (from Time)	Inoue	Inoue
9.	"Calling" (from Tree)	Inoue	Takashi Iioka
10.	"Ai o Motto (愛をもっと)" (from Tree)	Yamamoto	Yamamoto
11.	"One and Only One" (from Time)	Inoue	Peter Kvint; Jonas Myrin
12.	"Tree of Life" (from Tree)	Inoue	Anders Grahn; Carlos Okabe
13.	"Bolero" (Re-recorded, from The Secret Code)	Lambsey

Notes

- Version D is only available on the Bigeast Official Shop, which requires Bigeast membership.

== Sales and certifications ==
Region	Certification	Certified units/sales
Japan (RIAJ)	Gold	167,259
