= O: The 2nd Asia Tour =

2007–08 concert tour by TVXQ

- Tour by TVXQ
- Promotional poster for the tour in Seoul
- Associated album: "O"-Jung.Ban.Hap.
- Start date: February 23, 2007
- End date: June 12, 2008
- No. of shows: 13

TVXQ concert chronology
- Heart, Mind and Soul Tour (2006); O: The 2nd Asia Tour (2007–08); Five in the Black Tour (2007)

O: The 2nd Asia Tour (stylized as TVXQ! The 2nd Asia Tour Concert "O"), was the second Asia-wide concert tour (third overall) by South Korean pop group TVXQ, launched in support of the group's third Korean studio album, "O"-Jung.Ban.Hap. (2006). Selling out almost all shows in arenas and stadiums across Asia throughout 2007 and 2008, it attracted 184,000 people in total.

The tour commenced with three shows in Seoul, South Korea from February 23 to 25, 2007 at the Olympic Gymnastics Arena. The theme of the concert war and peace, which was inspired by the lyrics in their album's lead single, "'O'-Jung.Ban.Hap." The members of TVXQ were presented as warriors of peace, descending to earth to protect humanity from war and corruption. The show was divided into twelve segments, including the encore. The setlist was mostly composed of songs from TVXQ's first three studio albums. The tour concluded in Beijing, China on June 12, 2008, at the Fengtai Stadium.

== Background ==
After embarking on their first Japanese concert tour, the Heart, Mind and Soul Tour, TVXQ returned to South Korea in late 2006 to release their third Korean studio album, "O"-Jung.Ban.Hap. The album sold 350,000 copies in three months, becoming the best-selling album of 2006. On January 8, 2007, TVXQ's agency announced the O Tour and revealed its official promotional poster as well as the tour's plans to perform 14 shows in 7 cities across Asia. The cities included Seoul, Beijing, Shanghai, Taipei, Hong Kong Bangkok, and Kuala Lumpur; however, the date for the Hong Kong leg never took place.

Ticket sales for the tour's first three stops in Seoul were made available on January 15, 2007, through Inter Park. The tour kicked off with a three-night residency at the Olympic Gymnastics Arena in Seoul from February 23 to 25, 2007. It held its first overseas concert in Taipei, Taiwan at the Chungshan Soccer Stadium. Due to severe weather conditions, a second show in Taipei was canceled.

Three encore dates in Seoul were announced in September 2007, and all 33,000 available tickets were sold out within a few minutes, crashing the server of Inter Park. An addition encore concert in Taipei, held at the Taipei Arena, took place on May 10, 2008. The O Tour ended on June 12, 2008, at the Fengtai Stadium in Beijing, totaling 13 shows and attracting 184,000 fans across Asia.

== Development and performance ==
The theme of the concert war and peace, which was inspired by the lyrics in their album's lead single, "'O'-Jung.Ban.Hap." The members of TVXQ were presented as warriors of peace, descending to earth to protect humanity from war and corruption. The stage was much more elaborate than their previous tour, with moving platforms, pyrotechnics, moving props, and wire fu, totaling a cost of US$1.6 million. The members of TVXQ were presented as warriors of peace, with action-packed video interludes.

The set list for the concert consisted of songs from TVXQ's first three Korean studio albums, as well as solo performances by each member. Super Junior's Donghae and Zhang Liyin remained as guest performers throughout the tour; Super Junior's Donghae was featured as a guest rapper for U-Know Yunho's solo performance "Spokesman", a number Yunho comprosed and wrote himself, while Zhang Liyin's vocals were featured in place of BoA's in TVXQ's performance of "Tri-Angle." For the Kuala Lumpur and Bangkok shows, Zhang Liyin performed her debut single "Timeless" with Xiah Junsu. During the Seoul encore shows in October 2007, Super Junior and Girls' Generation made guest appearances. Throughout the three-day encore concerts, Yunho had to perform in a separate stage platform due to a back injury he sustained during rehearsals.

== Broadcasts and recordings ==
The February 23 to 25, 2007 shows in Seoul were recorded for CD and DVD. Prior to the concert's debut, a documentary of the band filming the concert's video interludes and concert rehearsals were aired on South Korea's Mnet. On February 26, Mnet aired a short program featuring the members getting interviewed and rehearsing in the studios. The November 24, 2007, show in Kuala Lumpur were recorded for television, and it aired on Malaysia's Mandarin Astro AEC in February 2008, airing in conjunction with the Chinese New Year.

The CD recording of the first three Seoul concerts were released on June 18, 2007, topping album charts. The CD also came with two bonus tracks, which were studio recordings of Yunho and Junsu's solos. A 2CD+DVD version was released in Taiwan through Avex Taiwan on September 28, 2007. The 2DVD Korean version was released on December 6, 2007, which included a photobook, a calendar, rehearsals, behind-the-scenes footage, interviews, and an additional music video.

== Setlist ==
This setlist is representative of the shows in Seoul on February 23–15, 2007. It does not represent all concerts for the duration of the tour.

1. "Phantom"
2. "Million Men"
3. "The Way U Are" (Remix version)
4. "Rising Sun"
5. "One"
6. "Believe" (Acoustic version)
7. "You’re My Miracle"
8. Xiah Junsu solo: "My Page"
9. Micky Yoochun solo: "One Last Cry"
10. U-Know Yunho solo: "Spokesman" (featuring Donghae of Super Junior)
11. "Hey! Girl"
12. "I Wanna Hold You"
13. Max Changmin solo: "When I First Kissed You"
14. Hero Jaejoong solo: "Crying"
15. "Drive"
16. "You Only Love"
17. "Dangerous Mind"
18. "Tri-Angle" (featuring Zhang Liyin)
19. "'O'-Jung.Ban.Hap" (Rearranged)
20. "Remember"

Encore

1. "Balloons"
2. "Hi Ya Ya"
3. "Unforgettable"
4. "Hug" (Rearranged)

== Tour dates ==
Date	City	Country	Venue	Attendance
February 23, 2007	Seoul	South Korea	Olympic Gymnastics Arena	36,000
February 24, 2007	Seoul	South Korea	Olympic Gymnastics Arena	36,000
February 25, 2007	Seoul	South Korea	Olympic Gymnastics Arena	36,000
October 5, 2007	Taipei	Taiwan	Zhongshan Soccer Stadium	—
October 26, 2007	Seoul	South Korea	Olympic Gymnastics Arena	33,000
October 27, 2007	Seoul	South Korea	Olympic Gymnastics Arena	33,000
October 28, 2007	Seoul	South Korea	Olympic Gymnastics Arena	33,000
November 24, 2007	Kuala Lumpur	Malaysia	Stadium Merdeka	20,000
December 15, 2007	Bangkok	Thailand	Impact Arena	30,000
December 16, 2007	Bangkok	Thailand	Impact Arena	30,000
May 10, 2008	Taipei	Taiwan	Taipei Arena	10,000
May 31, 2008	Shanghai	China	Hongkou Football Stadium	25,000
June 12, 2008	Beijing	China	Beijing Fengtai Stadium	20,000
Total				184,000

== Guest acts ==
- Donghae (all)
- Zhang Liyin (all)
- Super Junior (Seoul encore)
- Girls' Generation (Seoul encore)
