= Epitaph (EP) =

- Digital cover

EP by Tohoshinki
- Released: March 16, 2022 (release history)
- Recorded: 2020–22
- Genre: J-pop; dance pop
- Length: 21:41
- Language: Japanese
- Label: Avex Trax
- Producer: Hi-yunk; Ryan Jhun; Cimo Fränkel; Rik Annema; Micah Ross Gordon; Jarin Lourens; Niclas Kings; DNA; Katsuhiko Yamamoto; URU

Tohoshinki chronology
XV (2019)	Epitaph (2022)	20&2 (2023)

Singles from Epitaph
- 1. "Small Talk" Released: November 27, 2020; 2. "Epitaph (For the Future)" Released: March 16, 2022

Epitaph is the first Japanese extended play by South Korean duo Tohoshinki. It was released on March 16, 2022, by Avex Trax. Epitaph is a pop album with elements of pop rock, dance pop, and synthesizers. It was released as a follow-up to Tohoshinki's solo EPs Human (2021) by Changmin and Kimi wa Saki e Iku (2022) by Yunho, and is also the duo's first original release in Japan since XV (2019). The EP's first track, "Epitaph (For the Future)" is the lead single.

Epitaph debuted at number three on the Oricon Albums Chart, breaking Tohoshinki's streak of number one debuts. Epitaph also debuted at number three on the Billboard Japan Hot Albums, but topped the Billboard Japan Download Albums, with 2,402 downloads on the first week.

Epitaph accompanied Tohoshinki's nation-wide Classyc Tour in 2023, which started at the Nippon Gaishi Hall in Nagoya on February 11, 2023, and concluded at the Tokyo Dome in Tokyo on June 25, 2023.

== Background and release ==
On October 18, 2021, Avex announced that Tohoshinki would be returning to the Japanese music scene with three consecutive releases starting December 2021. Referring to the EPs as mini albums, it was announced that Changmin would be releasing his mini album Human in December 2021, followed by Yunho's mini album Kimi wa Saki e Iku in January 2022, and finally the duo comeback mini album Epitaph in February 2022. Epitaph would be the duo's first Japanese release since XV in 2019. However, due to production issues as a result of the COVID-19 pandemic in Japan, Yunho's mini album was delayed to a February 9, 2022 release, while Epitaph was delayed to March 16, 2022. Changmin's Human was released as scheduled, on December 8, 2021.

The tracklist of the album was unveiled on March 5, 2022. Avex released snippets of each track every day starting March 5, 2022, through Tohoshinki's official Twitter account. The EP's official website was also revealed. Their single "Small Talk" (2020), which sold 9,786 downloads, was also revealed to be part of the tracklist. On March 12, a music video teaser of the EP's lead single "Epitaph (For the Future)" was released. A television advertisement for the EP's release, which also featured an extended snippet of the lead single, was revealed on March 14.

From March 14 to 20, promotional images of Epitaph were posted at the Metro Promenade in the Shinjuku Station. The music video for "Epitaph (For the Future)" was released on March 16, alongside the EP. From March 16 to 22, the music video was broadcast at the Yunika Vision, a landmark of Shinjuku, every twenty minutes from 7:00 PM to 10:00 PM.

== Composition ==
Epitaph consists of six tracks. A pop album, the EP opens with "Epitaph", a pop rock dance track, with lyrics about determination toward the future. The second track "Like Snow-White" is a mid-tempo track with funk and R&B elements. "Mahoroba" draws inspiration from trap music with heavy bass. "Storm Chaser" is a mid-tempo rock ballad, and "Light My Moon Like This" is a mashup of Changmin's b-side track "Light Up My Moon" from Human (2021) and Yunho's "Shake It Like This" from Kimi wa Saki e Iku (2022). A lyric video for "Light My Moon Like This" was released on March 20.

== Reception ==
Epitaph debuted at number two on the daily Oricon Albums Chart on the first day of release, selling 24,884 copies. It entered the Oricon Albums Chart at number three, with 36,038 copies sold on the first week for release. Epitaph broke Tohoshinki series of number one debuts in Japan, and was their lowest-charted album since T (2008), which debuted at number four. Epitaph stayed charted for 17 weeks on the Oricon, selling 45,808 copies by the end of the year, and ranking 86th on Oricon's year-end chart.

Epitaph also debuted at number three on the Billboard Japan Hot Albums, its lowest-charted album since the chart's inception in 2015. However, it topped the Billboard Japan Download Albums Chart, with over 2,402 downloads.

== Track listing ==
Epitaph track listing
No.	Title	Lyrics	Music	Producer(s)	Length
1.	"Epitaph (For the Future)"	Hi-yunk	Hi-yunk	Hi-yunk	3:57
2.	"Like Snow-White"	Kelly	Ryan Jhun; Cimo Fränkel; Micah Ross Gordon; Rik Annema; Sophie Hintze	Jhun; Fränkel; Annema; Gordon	3:04
3.	"Small Talk"	Shinjiroh Inoue	Cayte Webber; Reece Pullinger; Jarin Lourens; Kristoffer Eriksson	Lourens	4:12
4.	"Mahoroba"	Kelly	Niclas Kings; Andy Love	Kings	3:34
5.	"Storm Chaser"	Kelly	Tania Doko; Jorgen Elofsson; David Musumeei; Anthony Egizii	DNA	3:20
6.	"Light My Moon Like This"	Katsuhiko Yamamoto; Yascotti	Yamamoto	Yamamoto; URU	3:33
Total length:					21:41

Notes

- "Epitaph (For the Future)" is stylized as "Epitaph -for the future-".
- "Mahoroba" is stylized in all caps.
- "Storm Chaser" is stylized as "Storm chaser".
- "Light My Moon Like This" is stylized as "Light My Moon Like THIS".

== Personnel ==
Musicians

- Tohoshinki – lead vocals (all tracks), background vocals (all tracks)
- Yoo Young-jin – background vocals (track 1), recording (1)
- Hi-yunk – background vocals (track 1), all instruments (1)
- Suginami Junior Chorus – background vocals (track 3)
- Jun – background vocals (track 5)
- Katsuhiko Yamamoto – background vocals (track 6)
- Yascotti – background vocals (track 6)
- Uda Shika – cello (track 1)
- Miho Shimokawa – violin (track 1)
- Shinjiroh Inoue – guitar (track 3)

Technical

- Katsutoshi Yasuhara – directing (all tracks)
- Yuka Koizumi – mastering (all tracks)
- Makoto Yamadoi – mixing (tracks 1, 2, 4, 5), recording (1, 5), editing (3)
- Jung Eun-kyung – recording (tracks 1, 2, 3, 5)
- Pollen – directing (tracks 1, 2)
- Atsushi Hattori – mixing (track 3), recording (3, 5)
- Kevin G. Cho – directing (tracks 3, 6)
- Dk Choo – directing (tracks 4, 5)
- Kim Kwang-min – recording (tracks 4, 6)
- URU – mixing (track 6)

== Charts ==
=== Weekly charts ===
Weekly chart performance for Epitaph
Chart (2022)	Peak position
Japanese Albums (Oricon)	3
Japan Hot Albums (Billboard Japan)	3

=== Year-end charts ===
Year-end chart performance for Epitaph
Chart (2022)	Position
Japanese Albums (Oricon)	86

=== Sales ===
Released	Oricon chart	Peak	Debut sales	Sales total
March 16, 2022
March 16, 2022	Daily Albums Chart	4	24,884	46,095
March 16, 2022	Weekly Albums Chart	3	36,038	46,095
March 16, 2022	Monthly Albums Chart (March)	10	41,112	46,095
March 16, 2022	Yearly Albums Chart (2022)	86	46,095	46,095

== Release history ==
Region	Date	Format	Label
Various	March 16, 2022	Digital download; streaming	Avex Entertainment
South Korea	March 16, 2022	Digital download; streaming	S.M. Entertainment
Japan	March 16, 2022	Digital download; streaming; CD	Avex Trax
