= Begin Again: Live Tour =

2017–2018 concert tour by Tohoshinki

- Tour by Tohoshinki
- Tour logo
- Location: Japan
- Associated album: Fine Collection: Begin Again
- Start date: November 11, 2017
- End date: June 10, 2018
- No. of shows: 20
- Website: toho-jp.net/special/beginagain-dvd/

Tohoshinki concert chronology
- With: Live Tour (2015); Begin Again: Live Tour (2017–18); Circle Tour (2018–19)

Begin Again: Live Tour (stylized as Tohoshinki Live Tour 2017 ～Begin Again～), also known as the Begin Again Tour, was the ninth Japanese concert tour (thirteenth overall) by South Korean pop duo Tohoshinki. Consisting of 20 shows across Japan, the tour commenced on November 11, 2017, at the Sapporo Dome in Sapporo, Hokkaido Prefecture and concluded on June 10, 2018, at the Nissan Stadium in Yokohama, Kanagawa Prefecture. It was the highest-grossing and most-attended concert tour in Japan that year, mobilizing over 1 million people.

The Begin Again Tour was the duo's first concert tour after their discharges from the Republic of Korea Armed Forces, which they served from 2015 to 2017. It was first announced on August 21, 2017, three days after Changmin's discharge. The tour was the duo's third nationwide five-dome tour, and supported their compilation album Fine Collection: Begin Again (2017).

The tour broke numerous records. With over 1 million attendees, the Begin Again Tour was the highest-grossing and most-attended concert tour ever held by a foreign artist in Japan, a title that Tohoshinki had held previously with their Time Tour in 2013. Tohoshinki were the first foreign artist in Japan to perform at the Nissan Stadium for three consecutive days, and also the first foreign artist to host two different concert series at the stadium. It was the highest-grossing concert tour in Japan in 2017.

== Background ==
From July 2015 to August 2017, Tohoshinki went on a hiatus to fulfill their compulsory military service for South Korea. During their hiatus, the members released solo mini albums U Know Y (2015) by Yunho, and Close to You (2015) by Changmin, both limited exclusive releases for their fanclub, Bigeast. On April 2, 2016, their tenth anniversary concert films Till (2016) and Till 2 (2017) were released at select theaters and venues, running from April to November 2016, and the sequel running from March to April 2017. Their first remix album as a duo, Two of Us, was released in October 2016.

On August 21, 2017, three days after Changmin's military discharge, the duo held a press conference to announce their return to music. Then, they announced they will first return to Japan with a Japanese compilation album Fine Collection: Begin Again in October 2017, which comprised all of their singles since they came back as a duo in 2011, as well as a few remixes of older songs. The Begin Again Tour, which accompanied the compilation album, opened at the Sapporo Dome on November 11, 2017. There, they debuted their first performance of their comeback Japanese single "Reboot," which was released in December 2017.

== Commercial performance ==
Initially announcing fourteen shows, three more shows were added for Osaka due to demand. The seventeen shows amassed over 780,000 people. Selling out all shows, Avex announced in January 2018 that the tour's final three days would be held at the Nissan Stadium in Yokohama, making Tohoshinki the first foreign artist in Japan to perform at the stadium for three consecutive days.

The shows at the Nissan Stadium in Yokohama alone grossed over ₩27.1 billion in ticket sales and over ₩29 billion in merchandise sales, with a total revenue of ₩56.1 billion (US$50 million).

== Set list ==
This set list was taken from the November 11, 2017, concert in Sapporo. It does not represent all shows throughout the tour.

1. "Reboot"
2. "Android"
3. "Humanoids"
4. "One More Thing"
5. "Superstar"
6. "Chandelier"
7. "B.U.T"
8. "Spinning"
9. "Survivor"
10. "One and Only One"
11. "Shiawase Iro no Hana"
12. "Still"
13. "Aitakute Aitakute Tamaranai"
14. "Duet"
15. "White"
16. "Catch Me"
17. "Easy Mind"
18. "I Just Can't Quit Myself"
19. "Ocean"
20. "Bolero"
21. "Why? (Keep Your Head Down)"

Encore

1. "Maximum"
2. "Rising Sun"
3. "We Are!"
4. "Summer Dream"
5. "Somebody to Love"
6. "Begin"

== Tour dates ==
Date	City	Venue	Attendance
November 11, 2017	Sapporo	Sapporo Dome	780,000
November 25, 2017	Tokyo	Tokyo Dome	780,000
November 26, 2017	Tokyo	Tokyo Dome	780,000
November 27, 2017	Tokyo	Tokyo Dome	780,000
December 2, 2017	Fukuoka	Fukuoka Dome	780,000
December 3, 2017	Fukuoka	Fukuoka Dome	780,000
December 20, 2017	Tokyo	Tokyo Dome	780,000
December 21, 2017	Tokyo	Tokyo Dome	780,000
December 26, 2017	Osaka	Kyocera Dome Osaka	780,000
December 27, 2017	Osaka	Kyocera Dome Osaka	780,000
December 28, 2017	Osaka	Kyocera Dome Osaka	780,000
January 12, 2018	Nagoya	Nagoya Dome	780,000
January 13, 2018	Nagoya	Nagoya Dome	780,000
January 14, 2018	Nagoya	Nagoya Dome	780,000
January 19, 2018	Osaka	Kyocera Dome Osaka	780,000
January 20, 2018	Osaka	Kyocera Dome Osaka	780,000
January 21, 2018	Osaka	Kyocera Dome Osaka	780,000
June 8, 2018	Yokohama	Nissan Stadium	225,000
June 9, 2018	Yokohama	Nissan Stadium	225,000
June 10, 2018	Yokohama	Nissan Stadium	225,000
Estimated total			1,005,000

== Video release ==
Tohoshinki Live Tour 2017 ～Begin Again～ is a live DVD and Blu-ray concert film by South Korean pop duo Tohoshinki, released on March 28, 2018, through Avex Trax in Japan. The DVD was filmed during the duo's ninth Japanese concert tour Begin Again, which ran from November 17 to January 2018. The tour was Tohoshinki's third nation-wide dome tour in Japan, performing at five domes across six cities, with the Nissan Stadium as its final stop. The DVD debuted at number one on the Oricon chart, charting for thirty-two weeks. Titled Tohoshinki Live Tour ～Begin Again～ Special Edition in Nissan Stadium, the Nissan Stadium recording was released as a separate DVD and Blu-ray release on December 19, 2018. It also debuted at number one on the Oricon, and charted for thirteen weeks.
