= Reboot (song) =

2017 single by TVXQ

Single by Tohoshinki

from the album Tomorrow
- B-side: "Begin ~Again Version~"
- Released: December 20, 2017 (release history)
- Recorded: August 2017
- Genre: J-pop; dance
- Length: 4:48
- Label: Avex Trax
- Songwriters: Obi Mhondera; Christopher Wortley; DWB; Hide Nakamura; H.U.B.
- Producer: DWB

Tohoshinki singles chronology
"Sakuramichi" (2015)	"Reboot" (2017)	"Road" (2018)

Music video
- "Reboot" (Short ver.) on YouTube

"Reboot" is the 44th Japanese single by South Korean pop duo Tohoshinki, released by Avex Trax on December 20, 2017. It was made available in three physical versions – a CD+DVD version, a CD only version, and a fan club edition exclusively for Tohoshinki's Japanese fan club, Bigeast. The B-side is a re-recording of their 2006 single "Begin".

"Reboot" was written by Obi Mhondera, Christopher Wortley, DWB, and Hide Nakamura, with lyrics by H.U.B. Production was led by DWB. Tohoshinki premiered a performance of the song at the Sapporo Dome, the first leg of their Begin Again Tour on November 11, 2017. Its accompanying music video was released YouTube on November 24, 2017.

The single was a commercial success in Japan, being certified gold by the Recording Industry Association of Japan. It debuted at number two on the Oricon Singles Chart and peaked at number three on the Billboard Japan Hot 100.

== Background and release ==
"Reboot" was recorded on August 21, 2017, immediately after a Tokyo press conference attended by Tohoshinki to announce their comeback in music. The press conference was held three days after Changmin's discharge from the Republic of Korea Armed Forces, in which he served nearly two years as an MP. "Reboot" was written by Obi Mhondera, Christopher Wortley, DWB, and Hide Nakamura, with lyrics by H.U.B., who has writing credits in all of Tohoshinki's albums since Time (2013). Production was led by DWB.

The announcement of "Reboot" was first shared to Japanese media on October 9, 2017. Promoted as Tohoshinki's "restart" song, "Reboot" was also introduced as the theme song to the Japanese television drama School Counselor. Snippets of the song was teased at the drama's press conference on October 12. School Counselor premiered on October 18. Avex Trax officially announced "Reboot" as Tohoshinki's 44th CD single on November 2. The B-side "Begin ~Again Version~" — a re-recording of Tohoshinki's 2006 single "Begin," was announced on November 12.

Tohoshinki debuted their performance of "Reboot" at the Sapporo Dome, the first leg of their Begin Again Tour on November 11. Jacket photos for the CD single was unveiled to the media on November 24, followed by the release of an accompanying music video for "Reboot," directed by Daisuke Ninomiya, the following day. A music video for "Begin ~Again Version~" directed by Hideaki Sunaga was teased on Japanese morning programs such as ZIP, MezamachiTV, and Sukkiri. The CD single was officially released on December 21, 2017.

== Commercial performance ==
Due to high social media exposure, the song debuted at number 23 on the CDTV Original Ranking chart and number 18 on the Billboard Japan Hot 100, three days ahead of its official release. The song peaked at number three on its third Billboard week, and "Begin ~Again Version~" peaked at number 22. According to the Oricon, "Reboot" debuted at number two on the Oricon Singles Chart, selling 123,659 physical copies in its first week. It debuted and peaked at number 5 on the Billboard Japan Top Download Songs chart, with "Begin ~Again Version~" debuting at number 33). "Reboot" sold 152,538 copies by the end of 2018, entering the top 50 of 2018's best-selling singles.

== Live performances ==
Tohoshinki performed both "Reboot" and "Begin ~Again Version~" at their nationwide Begin Again Tour, which lasted from November 2017 to June 2018. They debuted their first television performance of "Reboot" on December 6, 2017 for the 2017 FNS Music Festival. The group trended on Twitter Japan for a full day following their performance. Tohoshinki were the second most-tweeted artists after Arashi from the same festival.

Their second television performance of "Reboot" was broadcast on CDTV's Special! New Year’s Eve Premier Live on December 31, 2017. The performance was pre-recorded on December 29.

== Formats and track listings ==
- Digital download single
1. "Reboot" – 4:48
2. "Begin ~Again Version~" – 6:12

CD+DVD single AVCK-79416/B (Limited), AVCK-79417/B
Disc 1 (CD)

1. "Reboot"
2. "Begin ~Again Version~"
3. "Reboot -Long Version-"
4. "Reboot -Less Vocal-"
5. "Begin ~Again Version~ -Less Vocal-"

Disc 2 (DVD)

1. "Reboot" (Video Clip)
2. "Begin ~Again Version~" (Video Clip)
3. "Reboot" (Video Clip Off Shot Movie) (Limited edition only)
4. "Begin ~Again Version~" (Video Clip Off Shot Movie) (Limited edition only)

CD single AVCK-79418/B

1. "Reboot"
2. "Begin ~Again Version~"
3. "Reboot -Long Version-"
4. "Reboot -Less Vocal-"
5. "Begin ~Again Version~ -Less Vocal-"

CD+VR single (Bigeast limited edition) AVC1-79419

1. "Reboot"
2. "Begin ~Again Version~"
3. "Reboot -Long Version-"
4. "Reboot -Less Vocal-"
5. "Begin ~Again Version~ -Less Vocal-"

VR contents: "Begin ~Again Version~" (VR Video Clip)

== Charts ==
Chart (2018)	Peak position
Japan (Oricon Singles Chart)	2
Billboard Japan Hot 100	3
Billboard Top Single Sales	2
Billboard Japan Streaming Songs	20
Billboard Japan Download Songs	5

=== Sales ===
Released	Oricon chart	Peak	Debut sales	Sales total
December 20, 2017	Daily Singles Chart	1	78,950	152,538
December 20, 2017	Weekly Singles Chart	2	123,659	152,538
December 20, 2017	Monthly Singles Chart (December)	6	140,559	152,538
December 20, 2017	Yearly Singles Chart (2018)	45	152,538	152,538

== Certifications ==
Region	Certification	Certified units/sales
Japan (RIAJ)	Gold	100,000^{^}
^{^} Shipments figures based on certification alone.

== Release history ==
Region	Date	Format	Label
Worldwide	December 20, 2017	Digital download on iTunes Store	Avex Entertainment
Japan	December 20, 2017	CD; CD+DVD	Avex Trax
South Korea	December 28, 2017	Digital download	S.M. Entertainment
Taiwan	January 12, 2018	CD; CD+DVD	Avex Taiwan
