= Tomorrow (TVXQ album) =

Studio album by Tohoshinki
- Released: September 19, 2018
- Recorded: 2017–2018
- Studio: Prime Sound Studio (Tokyo, Japan); S.M. Lyvin Studio (Seoul, South Korea); S.M. Booming System; Avex Azubu Studio; Bunkamura Studio; S.M. Yellow Tail Studio; Glor 103 Studio; Victor Studio
- Genre: J-pop; dance-pop
- Length: 55:00
- Language: Japanese
- Label: Avex Trax
- Producer: Nam So-young; Ryuhei Chiba; Katsutoshi Yasihara; Tore Johansson; Fredrik Thomander; Dani Paz; Juanjo Monserrat; Hanif "Hitmanic" Sabsevari; Future Sound; Yoo Young-jin; Kiyoshi "KC" Matsuo; Joe Lawrence; DWB; Matthew Tishler; Andrew Underberg; Thomas Stengaard

Tohoshinki chronology
New Chapter #1: The Chance of Love (2018)	Tomorrow (2018)	New Chapter #2: The Truth of Love (2018)

Singles from Tomorrow
- 1. "Reboot" Released: December 20, 2017; 2. "Road" Released: July 25, 2018; 3. "Asu Wa Kuru Kara (Tomorrow version)" Released: September 19, 2018

Tomorrow is the ninth Japanese studio album by South Korean pop duo Tohoshinki, released by Avex Trax on September 19, 2018. The record was released in four physical versions – Version A, a CD+Blu-ray version include music videos and behind-the-scenes content; Version B, a CD+DVD version with similar content; Version C, a CD only version; and Version D, a fan club limited edition. Recording and writing for the album roughly started in 2017; it was officially announced on August 1, 2018. Tomorrow is Tohoshinki's first original Japanese studio album since 2014's With.

The record debuted at number one on the Oricon Albums Chart with first-week sales of 125,319 copies, making it Tohoshinki's seventh album to do so. With Tomorrow, Tohoshinki was tied with BoA for having the most number one albums in Japan as a foreign artist. Tohoshinki went on to break that record a year later, with the release of XV (2019).

A commercial success, Tomorrow is certified gold by the Recording Industry Association of Japan (RIAJ). The album is supported by the Tomorrow Tour, their most expansive Japanese tour since debut, from September 2018 to January 2019.

"Reboot" was released as the album's first single on December 20, 2017. The album's second single was "Road," released on July 25, 2018. Both singles debuted at number two on the Oricon Singles Chart and were certified gold by the RIAJ. Tomorrow's promotional single was a re-recording of the One Piece theme song "Asu Wa Kur Kara", which was previously released in 2006.

== Background and release ==
In February 2018, Tohoshinki announced that they have renewed their contracts with their Korean agency S.M. Entertainment, and subsequently with Avex Trax. Following the release of their eighth Korean studio album New Chapter #1: The Chance of Love, the duo started work on Tomorrow.

Tomorrow was officially announced on August 1, 2018 through Tohoshinki's official website. It contains a total of thirteen tracks, which were revealed on August 17, 2018. Among the tracks included a re-recording of the One Piece theme song "Asu Wa Kuru Kara," which was previously released in 2006. "Asu Wa Kuru Kara" trended on Twitter in Korea following the announcement. The album was officially released on September 19, 2018.

== Singles ==
=== "Reboot" ===
"Reboot" was recorded on August 21, 2017 in Tokyo, three days after Changmin's discharge from the Republic of Korea Armed Forces. A short version of "Reboot" was first released in October 2017, as the theme song for the Japanese television drama School Counselor (2017), which stars Mao Inoue. Although it was not released at the time, "Reboot" debuted at No. 100 on Billboard's Japan Hot 100 for the week of October 23 due to the song's trending on Twitter. "Reboot" was among the songs used for Tohoshinki's collaboration with Canal Christmas for the AQUA Illumination Show in Fukuoka. The single was subsequently used as the title song Tohoshinki's comeback dome tour, the Begin Again Tour.

Jacket shots for "Reboot" was revealed on November 24, 2017. The accompanying music video for the single premiered on Space Shower TV on November 30, 2017. Tohoshinki debuted their television performance of "Reboot" at the 2017 FNS Music Festival on December 6, 2017.

The single was officially released on December 20, 2017 as Tohoshinki's 44th Japanese single. It debuted at number 2 on the Oricon Singles Chart on the first day of release, behind Hey! Say! JUMP's "White Love." The single ultimately landed on the number two spot on the Oricon Singles Chart for the week of January 1, 2018, selling 123,659 copies. It sold 151,943 copies as of January 31, 2018.

=== "Road" ===
The album's second single "Road" was announced on June 1, 2018. It was Tohoshinki's first CD single to not be released with an accompanying DVD. A preview of the music video for "Road" was revealed on the TBS news program HayaDOKI on the morning of June 27, including behind-the-scenes footage of the music video. The full version was subsequently revealed on YouTube. It was shot in Hokkaido.

"Road" was used as the monthly theme songs for NTV's UCHI no GAYA ga Sumimasen!, Saiyou! FLIP NEWS, and BUZZ RHYTHM 02. The single was officially released on July 25, debuting at number 2 on the daily Oricon Singles Chart behind Arashi's "Natsu Hayate." It subsequently finished the week at number two with 86,458 copies sold. "Road" debuted at number 2 on the Billboard Japan Hot 100.

== Track listing ==
Tomorrow (All versions) – Disc 1 (CD)
No.	Title	Length
1.	"Make a Change"	4:00
2.	"Yippie Ki Yay"	4:05
3.	"Showtime"	3:25
4.	"The Chance of Love" (運命; Japanese version)	3:31
5.	"Asu wa Kuru Kara" (Tomorrow version; 明日は来るから, "Because Tomorrow Will Come")	5:16
6.	"Get Going"	3:18
7.	"Jungle"	3:52
8.	"Reboot" (long version)	5:13
9.	"Trigger"	3:39
10.	"Electric Love"	3:25
11.	"This Is My Love"	4:25
12.	"Road"	4:47
13.	"Begin" (Again version)	6:13
Total length:		55:00

Versions A + B – Disc 2 (Version A Blu-ray, Version B DVD)
No.	Title	Length
1.	"Reboot" (video clip)
2.	"Begin" (Again version video clip)
3.	"Road" (video clip)
4.	"Road" (Lip version video clip)
5.	"Asu wa Kuru Kara" (Tomorrow version video clip)
6.	"Reboot" (Jacket off shot movie)
7.	"Road" (Jacket off shot movie)
8.	"Asu wa Kuru Kara" (Tomorrow version; video clip off shot movie)
9.	"Tomorrow" (Jacket off shot movie)
10.	"東方神起 2017～2018 Begin Again Documentary Film" (Live at A-nation 2014 Stadium Festival)

Version D (Bigeast limited edition) – Disc 2 (DVD)
No.	Title	Length
1.	"東方神起 LIVE TOUR 2017 ～Begin Again～ 2017/12/21@TOKYO DOME Digest" (Live clip)

Notes

- Version D is only available on the Bigeast Official Shop, which requires Bigeast membership.

== Charts ==
=== Weekly charts ===
Chart (2018)	Peak position
Japanese Albums (Oricon)	1

=== Year-end charts ===
Chart (2018)	Position
Japanese Albums (Oricon)	25

== Sales and certifications ==
Region	Certification	Certified units/sales
Japan (RIAJ)	Gold	153,262
