= New Chapter No. 1: The Chance of Love =

New Chapter #1: The Chance of Love
- Digital and B version cover.

Studio album by TVXQ
- Released: March 28, 2018
- Recorded: 2017–2018
- Studio: SM Lyvin Studio; Doobdoob Studio; MonoTree Studio; SM Booming System; SM Big Shot Studio; SM Blue Ocean Studio; SM Blue Cup Studio; SM Yellow Tail Studio; SM Concert Hall Studio; Seoul Studio
- Genre: K-pop; R&B; dance; electronic
- Length: 36:56
- Language: Korean
- Label: SM; iRiver
- Producer: Coach & Sendo; Noah Conrad; Dsign Music; Duncan de Moor; EKKO; Yoko Hiramatsu; Joombas; LDN Noise; Marcus Lindberg; Park Chang-hyun; Jihad Rahmouni; Matthew Tishler; Jake Torrey; Hjalmar Wilen; Yoo Young-jin

TVXQ chronology
| Fine Collection: Begin Again (2017) | New Chapter #1: The Chance of Love (2018) | Tomorrow (2018) |

Singles from New Chapter #1: The Chance of Love
- 1. "The Chance of Love" Released: March 28, 2018; 2. "Love Line" Released: March 28, 2018

New Chapter #1: The Chance of Love is the eighth Korean studio album by South Korean duo TVXQ. It was released on March 28, 2018, by SM Entertainment. It is the duo's first full-length Korean album since their discharge from the South Korean army, which they served from 2015 to 2017. The Chance of Love is described to be a "mature sexy" album, with many songs in the album following a metropolitan style of sound that encompasses various genres, including electronic music, R&B, jazz pop, and pop ballad. "The Chance of Love", a swing jazz-inspired dance song, was the album's lead single, with the mid-tempo pop song "Love Line" as the album's follow-up promotional single.

The Chance of Love received generally mixed reviews from Korean music critics, who felt the album lacked musical consistency, but praised the duo's vocal performances. In South Korea, the album debuted at number one on the Gaon Albums Chart, TVXQ's fifth consecutive number one on the chart, and moved 110,000 copies on the first month. It ended the year as South Korea's 14th best-selling album. The sequel album, New Chapter #2: The Truth of Love, was released on December 26, 2018.

== Background and composition ==
From 2015 to 2017, the duo went on a hiatus to fulfill their compulsory military service. U-Know Yunho was inducted into the Republic of Korea Armed Forces in July 2015, and he joined the military band for the 26th Mechanized Infantry Division on August 31. Max Changmin was inducted into the armed forces as a conscripted policeman in November 2015. For the next two years, the duo recorded The Chance of Love during their breaks from the military. Yunho was finally discharged from service in April 2017, and Changmin in August 2017.

On August 21, 2017, no more than three days after Changmin's discharge, a press conference was held in Seoul to welcome the duo's complete comeback to the music industry. Two more press conferences were held in Tokyo and Hong Kong. At the conferences, the duo announced their comeback concert Your Present, new solo releases, and a comeback album, later revealed to be New Chapter #1: The Chance of Love, the first in a series of two musical releases. The name New Chapter is a reflection of TVXQ's own evolution from being a boy band to a mature vocal group.

TVXQ described the new album as "fluid", with "easy-listening" songs like "Love Line" and "The Chance of Love" as starters. The record then dives into more mature-sounding styles, consisting of tracks produced with a future bass sound. The album is meant to be listened in order so it could play out like a movie.

== Promotion ==
The Chance of Love was officially announced on March 16, 2018, with the slogan "King of K-Pop is Back!" A series of teaser videos, directed by Cho Han-jin were revealed between March 18 and March 22, all which included snippets of the tracks from the new album. The first video titled "New Chapter Film #T" dropped on March 18 in which Changmin's solo track "Closer" was used as the background music. On March 19, the duo appeared in a 30-minute live stream session for VLIVE, where they announced the midnight premiere of the album's second teaser, "New Chapter Film #V", which used "Only for You" as the background track. The third teaser #X was revealed on March 21 with a snippet of "Sun & Rain" as the accompanying music. The last teaser #Q included the instrumental of "Bounce". The teaser videos consisted of footage from the album's photobook.

On March 23, TVXQ unveiled a teaser video for the single "Love Line" on YouTube. A television commercial for the album's lead single "The Chance of Love" started airing on March 24, while a different version premiered on YouTube. The music video for "The Chance of Love" was directed by Rigend Film, while "Love Line" was directed by Kim Ji-yong.

== Reception ==
Professional ratings
Review scores
| Source | Rating |
|---|---|
| IZM | 3/5 stars |

=== Critical reception ===
IZM gave The Chance of Love a mixed review; though the duo's vocal performances were praised, the album itself was said to have lacked cohesion. The publication noted that the album was a deviation from TVXQ's earlier sounds, which focused on hard-hitting SMP vocals and strong beats. Nonetheless, the group received praise for making efforts in adjusting their style to the ever-changing pop music scene.

=== Commercial performance ===
On the first day of release, the album debuted at number one on South Korea's digital charts. In Japan, The Chance of Love debuted at number seven on the Oricon Albums Chart.

== Track listing ==
New Chapter No. 1: The Chance of Love track listing
| No. | Title | Lyrics | Music | Length |
|---|---|---|---|---|
| 1. | "Love Line" (평행선; Pyeonghaengseon; lit. Parallel Lines) | Kim Min-ji; ZNEE | Jake Torrey; Noah Conrad; Khristian Araneda | 3:16 |
| 2. | "The Chance of Love" (운명; Unmyeong; lit. "Fate") | Yoo Young-jin | Jihad Rahmouni; Lorenzo Fragola; Haris Alagic; Young-jin | 3:27 |
| 3. | "Broken" (다 지나간다...; Da Jinaganda...; lit. "It Will Pass") | Jo Yoon-kyung | Choi Jun-suk; Nermin Harambašić; Jakob Mihoubi; Rudi Daouk | 3:28 |
| 4. | "Only For You" | Lee Hee-jun; Lee Seu-ran | Delly Boi; Davey Nate; Jass Reyes | 2:56 |
| 5. | "Puzzle" (U-Know Yunho solo; 퍼즐) | Jung Jan-dee | Gregory Bonnick; Hayden Chapman; Adrian McKinnon; Tay Jasper | 3:04 |
| 6. | "Closer" (Max Changmin solo) | Hwang Ji-won; Bong Eun-young | Rahmouni; Duncan de Moor | 3:08 |
| 7. | "Bounce" | Seu-ran; Le'mon | Kyle MacKenzie; Keir MacCulloch; Hannah Wilson; Aston Merrygold; Young-jin | 3:18 |
| 8. | "Wake Me Up" | realmeee | Coach & Sendo; Andrew Choi | 3:35 |
| 9. | "Lazybones" (게으름뱅이; Geeureumbaengi; lit. "Idler") | Park Chang-hyun | Chang-hyun | 4:00 |
| 10. | "Without You" (새벽 공기; Saengbyeok Gonggi; lit. "Air of Dawn") | Seu-ran | Marcus Lindberg; Hjalmar Wilen; Yoko Hiramatsu | 3:15 |
| 11. | "Sun & Rain" | JQ; Lee Ji-hye; Shim Chang-min | Mathew Tishler; Aaron Benward; Felicia Barton; Yoon-gun | 3:29 |
| Total length: | | | | 36:56 |

== Personnel ==
Credits adapted from the liner notes of New Chapter #1: The Chance of Love.

Performers and musicians

- TVXQ (U-Know Yunho, Max Changmin) – vocals, background vocals
- Byung Jang-moon – background vocals (track 1)
- Yoo Young-jin – background vocals (track 2)
- Byun Jang-moon – background vocals (tracks 3–4)
- Park Sang-hyuk – background vocals (track 3)
- Joo Chan-yang – background vocals (tracks 5, 8)
- Onestar – background vocals (tracks 7, 11)
- Han Soong-hyun – background vocals (track 9)
- Coach – bass (track 8)
- Choi Hoon – bass (track 9)
- Sendo – piano (track 8)
- Kang Su-ho – drums (track 9)
- Lee Na-il – strings (track 9)

Technical personnel

- Yoo Young-jin – vocal direction, editing, mixing, recording (tracks 1–5, 7–8, 10)
- Lee Ju-hyung – vocal direction, editing, recording (tracks 1, 11)
- Choo Dae-gwan – vocal direction, editing (tracks 1, 4–7, 10)
- Onestar – vocal direction (tracks 1, 4, 6–7)
- Joo Chan-yang – vocal direction (tracks 5, 8)
- Park Chang-hyun – vocal direction, piano, recording, editing (track 9)
- Lee Ji-hong – recording, editing, mixing (tracks 1, 3–9, 11)
- Ahn Chang-kyu – recording (tracks 1, 4–5, 7–8, 11)
- Lee Min-kyu – recording (tracks 3, 8)
- Kim Chul-soon – mixing, recording (tracks 1, 6, 8)
- Park Sang-hyuk – editing (track 3)
- Jung Wui-seok – mixing (track 3)
- Goo Jong-pil (BeatBurger) – mixing (tracks 4, 10)
- Jung Eun-kyung – recording (tracks 5, 10)
- Woo Min-jung – recording (track 5)
- Seo Eun-kyung – editing (track 6)
- Nam Goong-jin – mixing (tracks 7, 9, 11)
- Uhm Chan-yong – recording (track 9)
- Jung Ki-hong – recording (track 9)
- Choi Da-in – recording (track 9)
- Lee Chan-mi – recording assistant (track 9)

== Charts ==
Chart performance for New Chapter No. 1: The Chance of Love
| Chart (2018) | Peak position |
|---|---|
| South Korean Albums (Gaon) | 1 |
