= Road (TVXQ song) =

2018 single by Japanese group

Single by Tohoshinki

from the album Tomorrow
- B-side: "Drop"; "In A Different Life"
- Released: July 25, 2018 (release history)
- Recorded: 2018
- Studio: Various: Prime Sound Studio (Avex Studio Azabu) (Tokyo, Japan); S.M. Lyvin Studio (Seoul, South Korea); Glor 103 Studio
- Genre: J-pop
- Length: 4:45
- Label: Avex Trax
- Songwriters: KOH; Shinjiroh Inoue
- Producer: Katsutoshi Yasuhara

Tohoshinki singles chronology
| "The Chance of Love" (2018) | "Road" (2018) | "Jealous" (2018) |

Music video
- "Road" on YouTube

"Road" is the 45th Japanese single by South Korean pop duo Tohoshinki for their ninth studio album Tomorrow. The CD single was released by Avex Trax on July 25, 2018 in three versions – a standard CD single, a limited first press edition with a photobook, and a fan club edition exclusively for Tohoshinki's Japanese fan club, Bigeast. The B-sides of the single are Japanese versions of their Korean singles "Drop" and "In A Different Life," solos respectively sung by Yunho and Changmin.

"Road" was written by KOH and Shinjiroh Inoue. Production was directed by Katsutoshi Yasuhara. The accompanying music video, directed by Takatoshi Tsuchiya, was released on YouTube a month ahead of its official release. Tohoshinki debuted their performance of "Road" on June 10, 2018 at the Nissan Stadium, the final leg of their Begin Again Tour.

The single was a commercial success in Japan, certifying gold by the Recording Industry Association of Japan. It debuted at number two on the Oricon Singles Chart and peaked at number two on the Billboard Japan Hot 100.

== Background and release ==
"Road" was written by in-house Avex writers KOH and Shinjiroh Inoue, with production direction headed by Katsutoshi Yasuhara. The single was announced on June 1, 2018, in which Avex confirmed that "Road" would be Tohoshinki's first single without a DVD version. Tohoshinki previewed a snippet of the song on their official website.

Unlike their previous releases, the music video for "Road" was released one month ahead of the single's official release. Directed by Takatoshi Tsuchiya, the music video premiered on YouTube on June 27, 2018. In the days leading up to its release, behind-the-scenes footage of the music video were aired through various Japanese morning programs. The music video was shot in Hokkaido.

On July 3, Avex announced "Road" would be a tie-in song for three Nippon TV programs: the July ending theme for Uchi no Gaya ga Sumimasen!, Saiyou! Flip News, and the August opening theme for Buzz Rhythm 02. It is also attached to a commercial for Huis Ten Bosch's new attraction, the Flower Canal. On July 5, the B-sides were announced to be Japanese re-recordings of their Korean singles "Drop" and "In A Different Life," solos respectively performed and written by Yunho and Changmin.

"Road" was officially released on July 25, 2018 as the final single leading up to the release of Tohoshinki's ninth Japanese album Tomorrow. "Road" was used in campaigns to promote the album's upcoming release, such as the Road to Tomorrow gallery. The free exhibition, which was displayed in the Gyoko-dori Underground Gallery in August 2018, consisted of recent photoshoots and music videos.

== Chart performance ==
"Road" entered the Billboard Japan Hot 100 at number 59 for the week ending on July 9, 2018 with points accumulated from social media exposure and video streaming views. It peaked at number two on both the Japan Hot 100 and the Billboard Top Single Sales. It debuted and peaked at number 33 on Billboard Japan Download Songs.

According to the Oricon, "Road" sold 86,458 copies on its first week in Japan, below Oricon's prediction of 121,400 copies and Tohoshinki's lowest first-week sales since "Survivor" (2009). Despite slower sales than previous singles, "Road" was a commercial success, certifying gold by the RIAJ. It ended the year as the 73rd best-selling single in pure physical sales.

== Live performances ==
Tohoshinki performed "Road" at the Nissan Stadium, the final leg of their Begin Again Tour, on June 10, 2018, as one of their encore songs. On July 20, the duo debuted their first televised performance of "Road" for Music Station. "Road" was part of the setlist for Tohoshinki's Tomorrow Tour (2018–19).

== Formats and track listings ==
- Digital download single
1. "Road" – 4:45
2. "Drop" (Yunho solo) – 4:18
3. "In A Different Life" (Changmin solo) – 3:27

CD single AVCK-79492 (Limited), AVCK-79493, AVC1-79494 (Bigeast)

1. "Road"
2. "Drop" (Yunho solo)
3. "In A Different Life" (Changmin solo)
4. "Road" (Less Vocal)
5. "Drop" (Less Vocal)
6. "In A Different Life" (Less Vocal)

== Charts ==
| Chart (2018) | Peak position |
|---|---|
| Japan (Oricon Singles Chart) | 2 |
| Billboard Japan Hot 100 | 2 |
| Billboard Top Single Sales | 2 |
| Billboard Japan Download Songs | 33 |

=== Sales ===
| Released | Oricon chart | Peak | Debut sales | Sales total |
|---|---|---|---|---|
| July 25, 2018 | Daily Singles Chart | 2 | 63,302 | 92,924 |
| July 25, 2018 | Weekly Singles Chart | 2 | 86,458 | 92,924 |
| July 25, 2018 | Monthly Singles Chart (July) | 8 | 89,801 | 92,924 |
| July 25, 2018 | Yearly Singles Chart (2018) | 73 | —N/a | 92,924 |

== Certifications ==
| Region | Certification | Certified units/sales |
|---|---|---|
| Japan (RIAJ) | Gold | 100,000^{^} |
^{^} Shipments figures based on certification alone.

== Release history ==
| Region | Date | Format | Label |
|---|---|---|---|
| Worldwide | July 25, 2018 | Digital download on iTunes Store | Avex Entertainment |
| Japan | July 25, 2018 | CD | Avex Trax |
| Taiwan | August 10, 2018 | CD | Avex Taiwan |
| Taiwan | August 15, 2018 | Digital download | Avex Taiwan |
| South Korea | October 16, 2018 | Digital download | S.M. Entertainment |
