= XV (TVXQ album) =

Studio album by Tohoshinki
- Released: October 16, 2019
- Recorded: 2018–2019
- Studio: Avex Azabu Studio (Tokyo); Avex Studio Aoyama (Tokyo); Bunkamura Studio (Tokyo); Studio Tanta (Tokyo); In Grid Studio (Seoul)
- Genre: J-pop; dance-pop; electropop
- Length: 56:01
- Language: Japanese
- Label: Avex Trax
- Producer: Hi-yunk; Matthew Tishler; Crash Cove; Dr. R; Jonas Jeberg; Nicolas Scapa; John Read Fasse; Mats Valentin; Willie Weeks; Shinjiroh Inoue; Benny Jansson; Uta; Chris Wahle; Yoichiro Kakizaki; Steve Manovski

Tohoshinki chronology
| New Chapter #2: The Truth of Love (2018) | XV (2019) | Epitaph (2022) |

Singles from XV
- 1. "Jealous" Released: November 21, 2018; 2. "Hot Hot Hot / Mirrors" Released: July 31, 2019; 3. "Guilty" Released: October 16, 2019

XV is the tenth Japanese studio album by South Korean pop duo Tohoshinki, released on October 16, 2019, by Avex Trax. XV (fifteen) denotes Tohoshinki's fifteenth debut anniversary in Japan. The duo announced the album's release at the A-Nation Music Festival, which they headlined, on August 18, 2019. XV was released in five physical versions: a standard CD version, a limited CD and Blu-ray version, a limited CD and DVD version, an exclusive fan club version, and a special "gift" version with a CD packaged in two different LP-size slips. Musically, XV is a varied electropop album that is influenced by a broad range of electronic musical genres, including influences from symphonic metal, soft rock, hip hop, dance-pop, and R&B. Recording for the album began shortly before the launch of their Japanese studio album Tomorrow in 2018.

"Jealous" was released as the album's lead single on November 21, 2018. The track debuted at number one on the Oricon Singles Chart and peaked at number three on the Billboard Japan Hot 100. "Hot Hot Hot" and "Mirrors" were released as a double A-side single on July 31, 2019, debuting at number two on the Oricon Singles Chart.

XV is Tohoshinki's eighth album to debut at number one on the Oricon Albums Chart, setting a new record for a foreign artist in Japan. The album also debuted at number one on Billboard Japan Hot Albums, with first-week sales of 155,000 copies.

XV is the accompanying album for Tohoshinki's XV Tour, the duo's sixth nationwide dome tour in Japan.

== Background and release ==
On May 23, 2019, Tohoshinki announced that they would be holding their fourth nationwide five-Dome tour in Japan from November 2019 to January 2020. They referred the tour as their fifteenth anniversary concert. On August 18, during their headlining appearance at the A-Nation Music Festival, Tohoshinki formally announced XV as their upcoming album. Their official website updated new details moments later. The Roman numerals XV denotes 15, referring to Tohoshinki's 15th debut anniversary in Japan. Like its namesake, the record is composed of 15 tracks.

A website for XV opened in September 2018. Two fan projects were launched to commemorate Tohoshinki's fifteenth anniversary; the first is a short movie consisting of fans being interviewed about their memories of being a Tohoshinki fan; the second is a dance workshop led by Tohoshinki's dance team. On September 11, Avex dropped a promotional image to media outlets and opened a "limited time" Twitter account for the album. The Twitter account will be opened from September 11 to November 8, 2019. Cover photos and the track list of XV were revealed on September 13, 2019. On September 29, Avex released 30-second teasers of each new track, dropping one new teaser per hour starting at 08:00 JST on Twitter.

== Promotion ==
The dance track "Jealous" was released as the album's lead single on November 21, 2018. The single debuted at number one on the Oricon Singles Chart — their first number one single on the chart since "Catch Me -If you wanna-" (2013) — and charted for 10 weeks. It peaked at number three on the Billboard Japan Hot 100. The single was Tohoshinki's 13th number one single on the Oricon, putting Tohoshinki as the foreign artist with the most number one singles in Japan. The music video of "Jealous" was released on YouTube on October 31, 2018.

"Hot Hot Hot" and "Mirrors" were released as a double A-side single on July 31, 2019. It debuted at number two on the Oricon Singles Chart. "Hot Hot Hot" peaked at number four on the Billboard Japan Hot 100 and "Mirrors" peaked at a moderate 46. The light-hearted "Hot Hot Hot" has been compared to Tohoshinki's previous summer singles "Ocean" and "Sweat", respectively taken from the albums Tree (2014) and With (2015). The music video for "Hot Hot Hot" was released July 19, 2019. The darker, rock-inspired "Mirrors" was used as the theme song for Asahi TV's prime-time television drama Sign (2019). A short movie of "Mirrors", intercepted with scenes from Sign, dropped on August 23, 2019.

"Guilty" was the album's final promotional track. The music video was released on YouTube on September 25, 2019. The duo debuted their performance of "Guilty" on Fuji TV's Music Fair on October 12, 2019. On October 15, a day before the album's release, they performed "Guilty" on NHK's Utacon. Their performance trended worldwide on Twitter, at number 11.

Though not released in the album's DVD and Blu-ray, a music video for the dance track "Hot Sauce" was released on YouTube on October 23, 2019.

== Reception ==
XV topped the daily Oricon Albums Chart on the first day of release, selling 105,884 copies. It maintained its top position on the weekly Oricon Albums Chart with 155,153 albums sold, already exceeding the lifelong sales of their previous studio album Tomorrow (2018). XV is Tohoshinki's eighth album to enter the Oricon at number one, setting a new record as the first and only foreign artist in Japan with eight number-one albums. It also debuted at number one on the Billboard Japan Hot Albums and Top Album Sales with 160,872 units. 13 tracks in the album entered mu-mo's Weekly Download Chart, with "Guilty" peaking at number three.

XV has received generally positive reviews from J-pop music critics. Japanese website Real Sound commended the album for taking a more aggressive attitude towards lyrics, music, and vocal style, yet still retaining the colorful pop sound that Tohoshinki have been known for.

== Track listing ==
XV track listing
| No. | Title | Lyrics | Music | Producer(s) | Length |
|---|---|---|---|---|---|
| 1. | "Hello" | H.U.B. | Hi-yunk | Hi-yunk (BACK-ON) | 4:03 |
| 2. | "Manipulate" | Kelly | Matthew Tishler; Elizabeth Russo; Kara Madden | Tishler; Crash Cove | 2:58 |
| 3. | "Hot Sauce" | Kelly | Dr. R; Elizabeth Abrams; Lola Blanc; Brandon Wollman | Ryosuke "Dr. R" Sakai | 2:39 |
| 4. | "Six In the Morning" | Kelly | Jonas Jeberg; Neil Ormandy; Dillon Deskin | Jeberg | 2:53 |
| 5. | "Hot Hot Hot" | Kelly | Nicolas Scapa; Michael John Hancock; John Read Fasse | Scapa; Fasse | 3:40 |
| 6. | "Master" | Kelly | William James McAuley III; Mats Valentin | Valentin | 3:51 |
| 7. | "Mekakushi (目隠し)" (Blindfold) | Tsukiko Nakamura | Hi-yunk | Hi-yunk | 4:03 |
| 8. | "Everyday" | H.U.B. | Willie Weeks; Kyler Niko | Weeks | 3:30 |
| 9. | "Hotaru no Namida (ホタルの涙)" (Tears of the Firefly) | Mami Yamada | Yamada | Shinjiroh Inoue | 4:06 |
| 10. | "Crimson Saga" | H.U.B. | Benny Jansson; Jonathan Bratthall-Tideman | Jansson | 4:06 |
| 11. | "Guilty" | Kelly; Hiro | Uta; Sunny Boy | Uta | 3:54 |
| 12. | "Mirrors (ミラーズ)" | Nakamura | Hi-yunk | Hi-yunk | 4:08 |
| 13. | "Jealous" | H.U.B. | Chris Wahle; Didrik Thrott; Chris Meyer | Wahle | 3:20 |
| 14. | "Yuki Furu Yoru no Barādo (雪降る夜のバラード)" (Ballad of the Night When Snow Falls) | Katsuhiko Yamamoto | Yamamoto | Yoichiro Kakizaki | 5:44 |
| 15. | "Pay It Forward" | H.U.B. | Steve Manovski; Craig Smart; Shaun Smith; Casey May; Jenson Vaughan | Manovski | 3:06 |
| Total length: | | | | | 56:01 |

CD hidden track
| No. | Title | Lyrics | Music | Arrangement | Length |
|---|---|---|---|---|---|
| 16. | "Truth" (Japanese version) | H.U.B. | Thomas Troelson; Jacob Littrell | Troelson | 2:57 |
| Total length: | | | | | 58:58 |

Blu-ray and DVD versions
| No. | Title | Director(s) | Length |
|---|---|---|---|
| 1. | "Jealous" (Video clip) | Hideaki Sunaga |
| 2. | "Hot Hot Hot" (Video clip) | Takuro Okubo |
| 3. | "Guilty" (Video clip) | Tetsuo Inoue |
| 4. | "Jealous" (Jacket off shot movie) | D. Walker |
| 5. | "Jealous" (Video clip off shot movie) | D. Walker |
| 6. | "Hot Hot Hot" (Jacket off shot movie) | D. Walker |
| 7. | "Hot Hot Hot" (Video clip off shot movie) | D. Walker |
| 8. | "XV" (Jacket off shot movie) | D. Walker |
| 9. | "Guilty" (Video clip off shot movie) | D. Walker |
| 10. | "a-nation 2018 supported by dTV & dTV Channel" (Off shot movie) | D. Walker |
| Total length: | | | 80:00 |

Bigeast limited edition – DVD
| No. | Title | Length |
|---|---|---|
| 1. | "a-nation 2018 supported by dTV & dTV Channel" (Live clip) | 50:00 |

Notes

- The Bigeast limited edition is only available for purchase at the Bigeast Official Shop, which requires Bigeast membership.

== Personnel ==
Adapted from the album liner notes.

- Tohoshinki – all vocals (all tracks)
- Tsukiko Nakamura – background vocals (track 7, 10)
- The Philharmonic Chorus of Tokyo – background vocals (track 10)
- Hiroaki Takeuchi – background vocals (track 10)
- Team T – background vocals (track 15)
- Hi-yunk (BACK-ON) – producer, composer, all instruments (tracks 1, 7 and 12)
- Matthew Tishler – producer, composer, all instruments (track 2)
- Crash Cover – producer, all instruments (track 2)
- Ryosuke "Dr. R" Sakai – producer, composer, all instruments (track 3)
- Jonas Jeberg – producer, composer (track 4)
- Nicolas Scapa – producer, composer (track 5)
- John Read Fasse – producer, composer (track 5)
- Mats Valentin – producer, composer (track 6)
- Willie Weeks – producer, composer, all instruments (track 8)
- Shinjiroh Inoue – producer (track 9)
- Benny Jansson – producer, composer (track 10)
- UTA – producer, composer (track 11)
- Chris Wahle – producer, composer, all instruments (track 13)
- Yoichiro Kakizaki – producer, piano (track 14)
- Steve Manovski – producer, composer (track 15)
- Elizabeth Russo – composer (track 2)
- Kara Madden – composer (track 2)
- Elizabeth Abrams – composer (track 3)
- Lola Blanc – composer (track 3)
- Brandon Wollman – composer (track 3)
- Neil Ormandy – composer (track 4)
- Dillon Deskin – composer (track 4)
- Michael John Hancock – composer (track 5)
- William James McAuley III – composer (track 6)
- Kyler Niko – composer (track 8)
- Mami Yamada – composer (track 9)
- Jonathan Bratthall-Tideman – composer (track 10)
- Sunny Boy – composer (track 11)
- Didrik Thott – composer (track 13)
- Chris Meyer – composer (track 13)
- Katsuhiko Yamamoto – composer (track 14)
- Craig Smart – composer (track 15)
- Shaun Smith – composer (track 15)
- Casey May – composer (track 15)
- Jenson Vaughan – composer (track 15)
- Blue – all instruments (track 6)
- Udai Shika Strings – strings (track 12)
- Masao Fuknaga – percussion (track 14)
- Satoshi Shoji – oboe (track 14)
- Kaori Obata – horn (track 14)
- Chieko Kinbara Strings – strings (track 14)
- Katsutoshi Yasuhara – track director (all tracks)
- Atsushu Hattori – mixer (tracks 1, 9, 10), recorder (tracks 3–6 and 8–11)
- Naoki Yamada – mixer (tracks 2 and 6)
- Yoshiaki Onishi – mixer (tracks 4, 5, 7, 8, 12 and 13)
- Shinpei Yamada – mixer, recorder (track 14)
- Makoto Yamadoi – recorder (tracks 1, 2, 7, 10, 12, 14 and 15), mixer (tracks 3, 11 and 15)
- Takeshi Takizawa – recorder (track 13)

== Charts ==
=== Weekly charts ===
Weekly chart performance for XV
| Chart (2019) | Peak position |
|---|---|
| Japanese Albums (Oricon) | 1 |
| Japan Hot Albums (Billboard Japan) | 1 |

=== Year-end charts ===
Year-end chart performance for XV
| Chart (2019) | Position |
|---|---|
| Japanese Albums (Oricon) | 18 |

== Sales ==
Sales figures for XV
| Released | Oricon chart | Peak | Debut sales | Sales total |
|---|---|---|---|---|
| October 16, 2019 | Daily Albums Chart | 1 | 105,884 | 184,201 |
| October 16, 2019 | Weekly Albums Chart | 1 | 155,153 | 184,201 |
| October 16, 2019 | Monthly Albums Chart | 2 | 172,025 | 184,201 |
| October 16, 2019 | Yearly Albums Chart | 18 | 184,201 | 184,201 |

== Release history ==
Release history and formats for XV
| Region | Date | Format | Label |
|---|---|---|---|
| Japan | October 16, 2019 | CD; Blu-ray; DVD; digital download; streaming | Avex Trax |
| South Korea | October 23, 2019 | digital download; streaming | SM Entertainment |
| Taiwan | November 6, 2019 | digital download; streaming | Avex Taiwan |
| Taiwan | November 22, 2019 | CD | Avex Taiwan |

== See also ==
- List of Oricon number-one albums of 2019
