= Penny Lane 24 =

Music venue in Sapporo, Japan

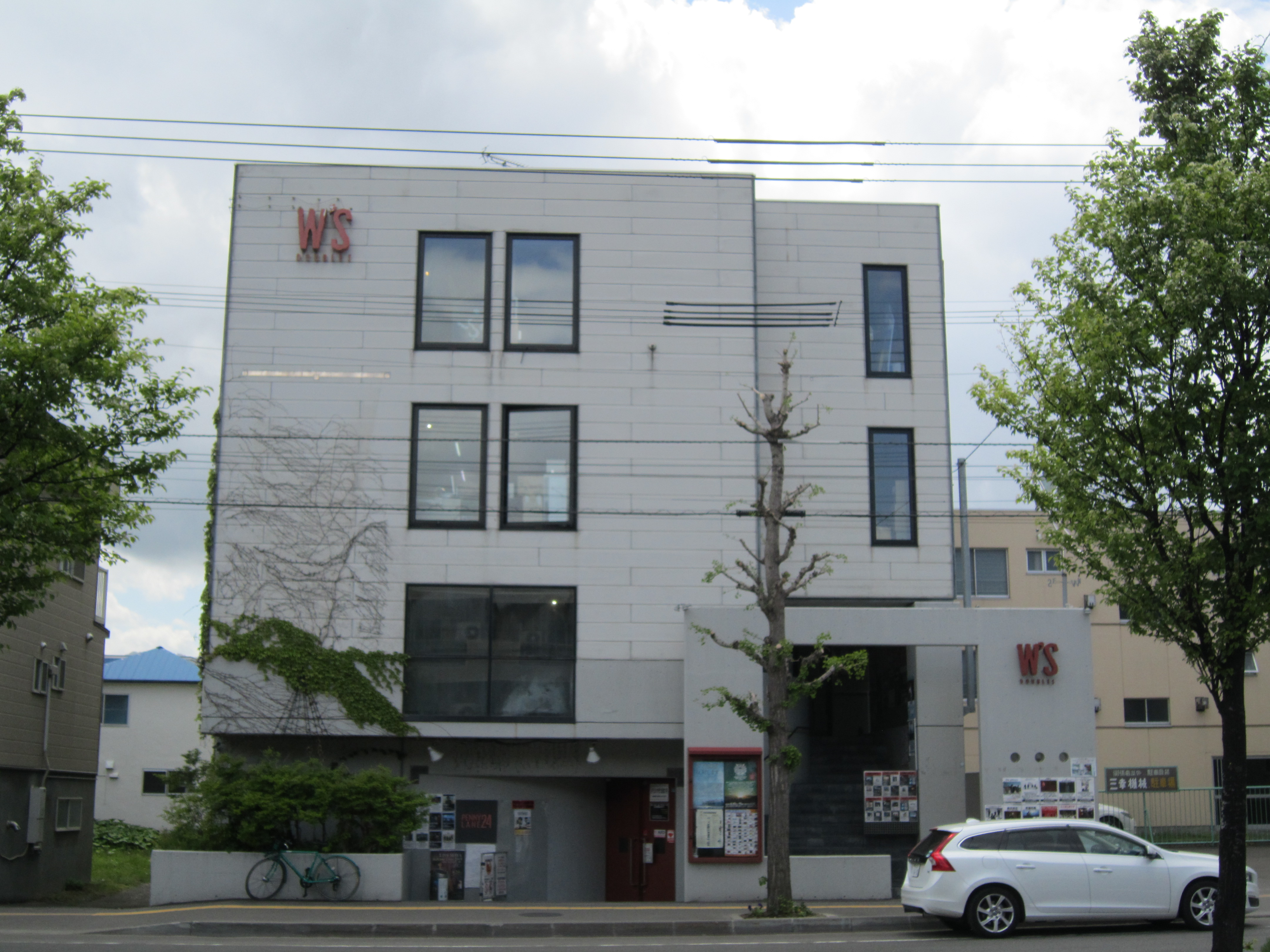
Penny Lane 24

Penny Lane 24 (ペニーレーン・トゥエンティフォー) is a 500-capacity live music venue located in Sapporo, Japan. It opened in 1990 and has hosted artists such as Uriah Heep, Bad Religion, Impellitteri and Foo Fighters.
