= New Chapter No. 2: The Truth of Love =

New Chapter #2: The Truth of Love
- Digital and White version cover.

EP by TVXQ
- Released: December 26, 2018
- Recorded: 2017–18 in Seoul, South Korea
- Genre: K-pop; R&B; dance; electropop
- Length: 24:29
- Language: Korean
- Label: S.M.; Iriver
- Producer: Blackcell; Digi; ICONIC SOUNDS; Jam Factory; Kenzie; Lee Soo-man (exec.); MonoTree; makeumine works; PK; Styalz Fuego; Thomas Troelsen; Tyler Shamy; Yummy Tone

TVXQ chronology
Tomorrow (2018)	New Chapter #2: The Truth of Love (2018)	XV (2019)

Singles from New Chapter #2: The Truth of Love
- 1. "Truth" Released: December 26, 2018

New Chapter #2: The Truth of Love is a Korean extended play record by the South Korean pop duo TVXQ. It was released on December 26, 2018, through SM Entertainment as a special commemorative album for the duo's fifteenth debut anniversary. The Truth of Love is the sequel to the duo's eighth studio album New Chapter #1: The Chance of Love, which was released on March 28, 2018.

The Truth of Love is dance-pop album with elements of R&B and electropop. Its lead single "Truth" is an R&B pop song infused with jazz. Lyrically, the record is a reflection of oneself recovering from the pain of separation.

The record debuted at number two on the Gaon Albums Chart in South Korea, moving 93,238 units. In Japan, The Truth of Love debuted at number 12 on the Oricon Albums Chart.

== Background ==
On November 28, SM Entertainment announced that TVXQ would hold a fan meeting at the Tiger Dome on December 26 to commemorate the duo's fifteenth anniversary, titled TVXQ! Special Day: The Truth of Love. The new record was also announced. The Truth of Love was released as a special album for TVXQ's fifteenth debut anniversary in South Korea, which fell on December 26, 2018.

The Truth of Love's lead single "Truth" was announced on December 19, 2018. The song, written and produced by Thomas Troelsen who also wrote TVXQ's 2008 K-Pop hit "Mirotic," is a jazzy R&B pop song with harmonizing vocals by Yunho and Changmin. The accompanying music video showcased a "symmetrical" dance that is reminiscent of a dance battle. The Truth of Love comprises seven tracks, two which are solos performed by U-Know Yunho and Max Changmin. Yunho's solo "City Lights" features a rap written and performed by Taeyong of NCT. Changmin wrote the lyrics to two tracks – "Jelly Love" and his solo, "Beautiful Stranger." The album's last track "Circle" is also the name of TVXQ's comeback concert, the Circle #welcome Tour, which debuted in Seoul on May 5, 2018.

== Promotion ==
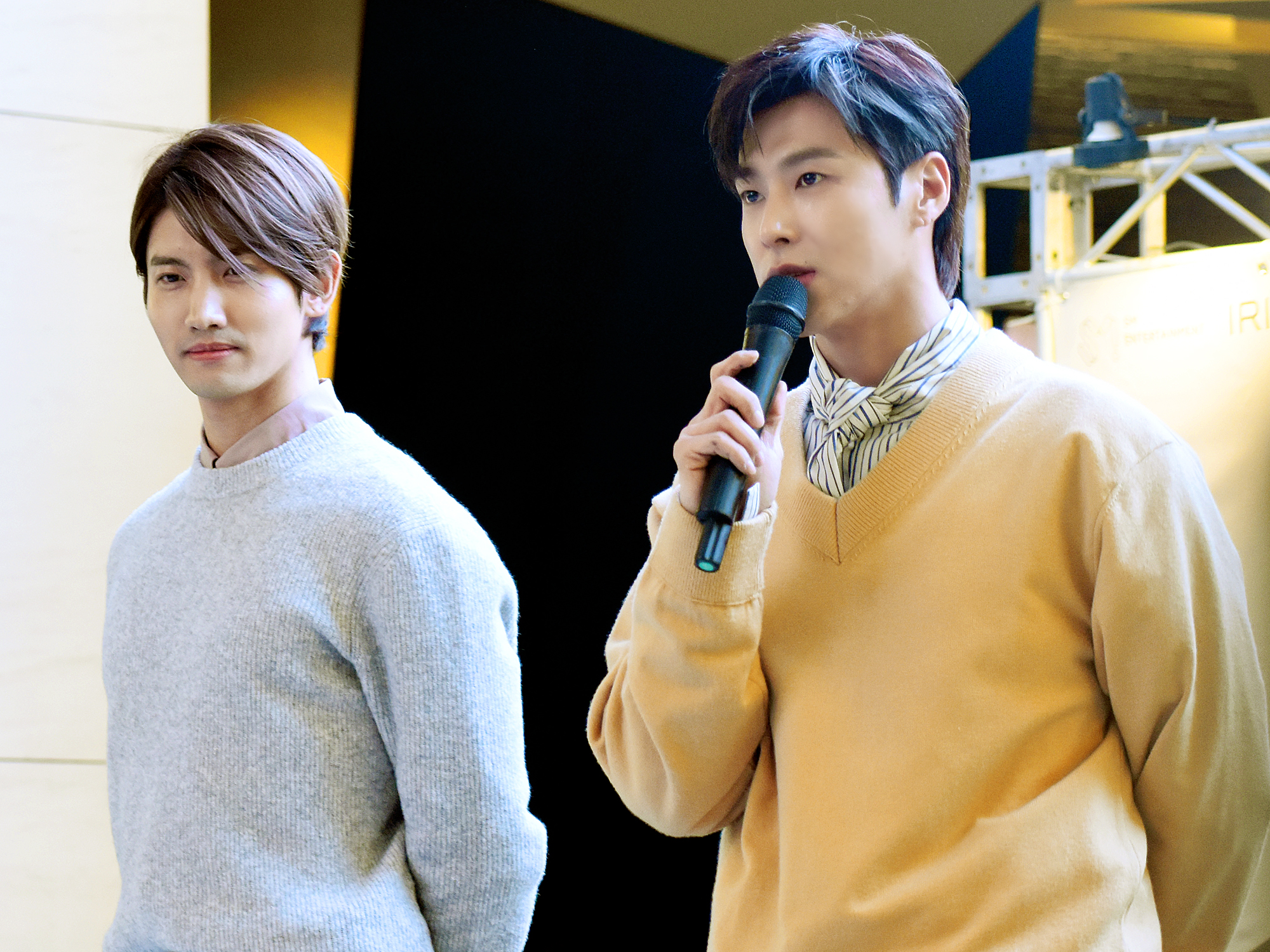
TVXQ during an autograph event at IFC Mall in Yeouido-dong, January 13, 2019

Promotion and marketing for the album first came in a series of social media updates and releases. TVXQ kickstarted the campaign with a surprise album cover drop on December 19, 2018. On December 20, two teaser images of Changmin were unveiled on social media, followed by the release of a short clip ("1st Clue by MAX") on YouTube. A second series of teaser images and a video ("2nd clue by U-KNOW") featuring Yunho was released on December 21. On December 22, SM Entertainment unveiled a group teaser ("3rd clue by TVXQ!") and a new album cover.

A teaser for the music video of the lead single "Truth" was dropped on December 24, followed with a third album cover. The final teaser for "Truth" aired on Christmas Day, along with several other teaser images. The official music video dropped on December 26 at 6pm KST, along with the album's digital release.

The physical CD album dropped the following day, in three versions: white, pink, and red. Each version is attached with a 168-page booklet, a poster, and a postcard.

== Reception ==
On the iTunes Store, The Truth of Love debuted at number one in seven countries: Japan, Indonesia, Thailand, Vietnam, Singapore, Saudi Arabia, and the United Arab Emirates. It peaked at number two in Taiwan, Hong Kong, and Malaysia, and number five in the Philippines.

In South Korea, the album debuted at number two on the Gaon Album Chart, breaking TVXQ's number one streak on the charts since its inception in 2010. According to the Hanteo Album Charts, which tracks real-time sales from affiliated retailers, The Truth of Love moved 37,000 pure album sales on the first week of release.

== Track listing ==
No.	Title	Lyrics	Music	Length
1.	"Truth"	Kyung Jin-hee	Thomas Troelsen; Jacob Luttrell	2:57
2.	"Sooner Than Later" (featuring The Quiett)	Kim Yeon-jung; Shin Dong-gab	Yeon-jung; Jamil Chammas; Kaelyn Behr; Micah Powell; James Patterson; Benjamin Ruttner; MZMC	2:59
3.	"Jelly Love"	January 8; JQ; Hyun Ji-won; MAYB; Shim Chang-min	G'harah Degeddingseze; Jakob Mihoubi; Rudi Daouk	3:33
4.	"Morning Sun"	Hwang Hyun; Son Go-eun; JQ	Big Sancho; Park Hae-il; Choo Dae-gwan; Onestar	3:31
5.	"夜話 (City Lights)" (Yahwa lit. "Night Stories"; solo performed by U-Know Yunho) (featuring Taeyong of NCT)	Hwang Yoo-bin; Lee Tae-yong	Tyler Shamy; Brooke Williams; Matt Wiggers; Zac White	3:24
6.	"아스라이... (Beautiful Stranger)" (Aseurai lit. "Faintly..."; solo performed by Max Changmin)	Chang-min; Kang Eun-jung	Shamy; Amit Ofir; Anthony Starble	3:51
7.	"Circle (동행)" (Donghaeng lit. "Accompany")	JQ; Ji-won; Ji-hye; Yoo-bin	Blackcell; Jakob Mihoubi; Rudi Daouk	4:14
Total length:				24:29

== Charts ==
Chart (2018)	Peak position
South Korean Albums (Gaon)	2
Japanese Albums (Oricon)	12

=== Sales ===
Region	Chart	Sales/shipments
South Korea	Gaon Albums Chart	93,238
South Korea	Hanteo Albums Chart	50,619
Japan	Oricon Albums Chart	12,960

== Release history ==
Region	Date	Format(s)	Label
Various	December 26, 2018	Digital download; streaming	SM Entertainment
South Korea	December 26, 2018	Digital download; streaming	SM Entertainment
South Korea	December 27, 2018	CD	SM Entertainment; IRIVER

== Personnel ==
Credits adapted from the liner notes of New Chapter #2: The Truth of Love.

Performers and musicians

- TVXQ (U-Know Yunho, Max Changmin) – lead vocals
- The Quiett – lead vocals (track 2)
- Taeyong – lead vocals (track 5)
- Joo Chan-yang – background vocals (tracks 1, 3, 5, 6)
- Andrew Choi – background vocals (tracks 2, 7)
- Micah Powell – background vocals (track 2)
- Onestar (MonoTree) – background vocals (track 4)
- Takey – guitar (track 4)
- Choo Dae-gwan (MonoTree) – electric piano (track 4)
- Pik Ssan-cho (Yummy Tone) – synthesizer (track 4)
- ON the string – strings (track 7)

Technical personnel

- Joo Chan-yang (Iconic Sounds) – vocal direction (track 1)
- Choo Dae-gwan (MonoTree) – vocal direction, recording, digital editing, protocols operating (tracks 1, 3, 4, 6)
- Kenzie – vocal direction (track 2)
- Pik Ssan-cho (Yummy Tone) – vocal direction (track 4)
- Jeon Seung-woo – vocal direction (track 5)
- Hwang Hyun (MonoTree) – vocal direction (track 7)
- Jung Ho-jin – recording (track 1)
- Kwak Jung-shin – recording (tracks 1, 3, 5)
- Jung Ki-hong – recording (track 2)
- Choi Da-in – recording (track 2)
- Kwon Yu-jin – recording, digital editing (tracks 2, 7)
- Hong Eun-yi – recording (track 6)
- Kim Jung (Iconic Sounds) – recording (tracks 3, 6)
- Hwang Hyun (MonoTree) – recording, digital editing (track 7)
- Oh Sung-geun – recording (track 7)
- Baek Kyung-hoon – recording (track 7)
- No Min-ji – digital editing (track 1)
- Lee Min-kyu – digital editing, engineer, mixing (tracks 2, 4–6)
- Lee Ji-hong – digital editing, engineer, mixing (tracks 1, 3, 5–7)
- Jang Woo-young – digital editing (track 9)
- Nam-gung Jin – mixing (track 1)
- Jung Ui-seok – mixing (track 2)
- Koo Jong-pil (BeatBurger) – mixing (tracks 3, 4)
- Kim Chul-soon – mixing (track 7)

== See also ==
- TVXQ albums discography
