= List of songs recorded by TVXQ =

South Korean pop duo TVXQ, known as Tohoshinki (東方神起, Tōhōshinki) in Japanese releases, have released 9 Korean studio albums, 10 Japanese studio albums, two Korean EPs, one Japanese EP, three Japanese compilations albums, 26 official Korean singles, and 51 official Japanese singles. They have collaborated with other artists for their album and promotional releases. TVXQ debuted as a five-piece boy band in 2003 under S.M. Entertainment and made their Japanese debut in 2005 under Avex Group. Aside from Korean and Japanese, TVXQ have also recorded Mandarin-language versions of their Korean singles.

== Released songs ==
Key
†	Indicates single release

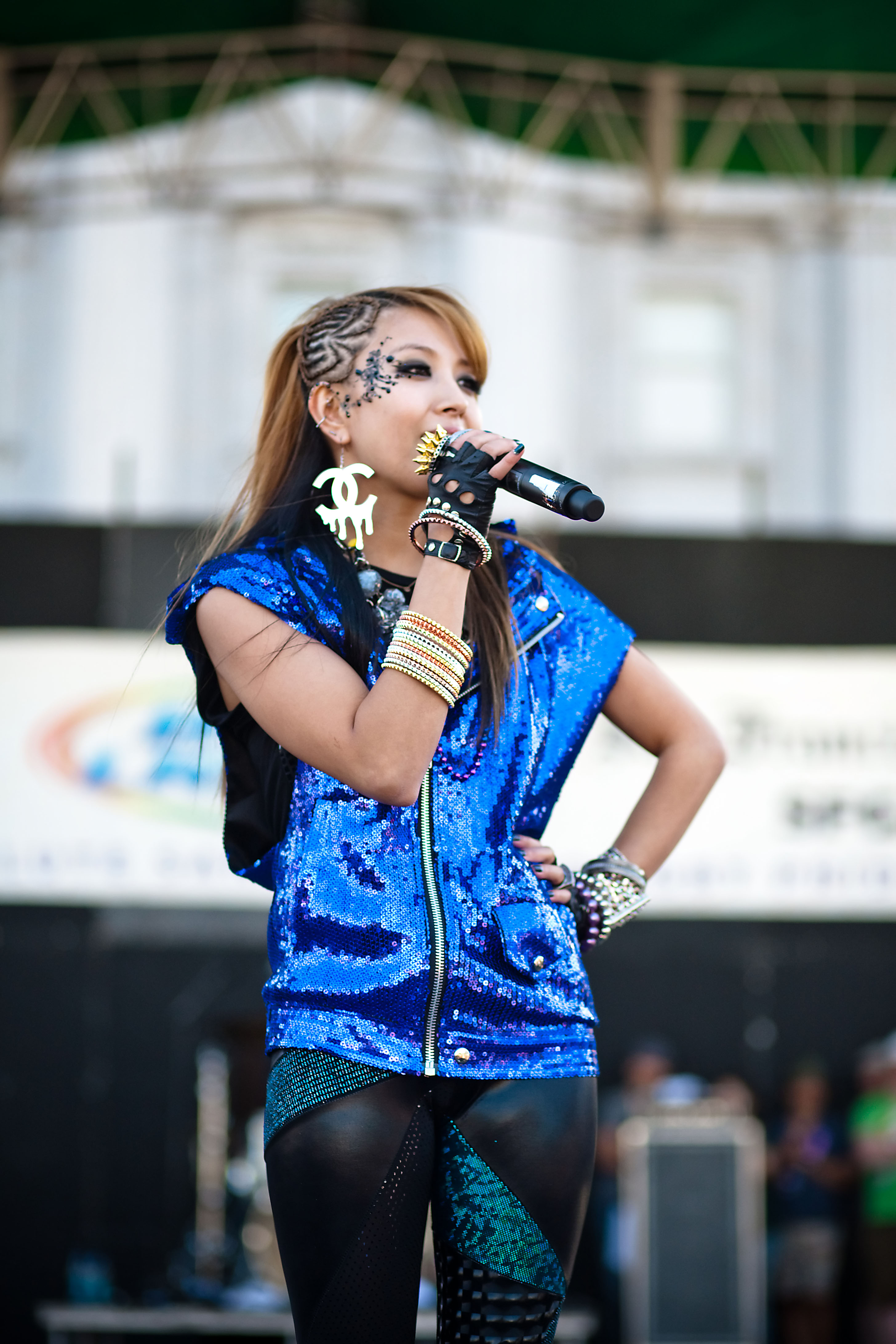
"Tri-Angle" features guest vocals by Korean singer BoA (pictured above) and rock band The TRAX.

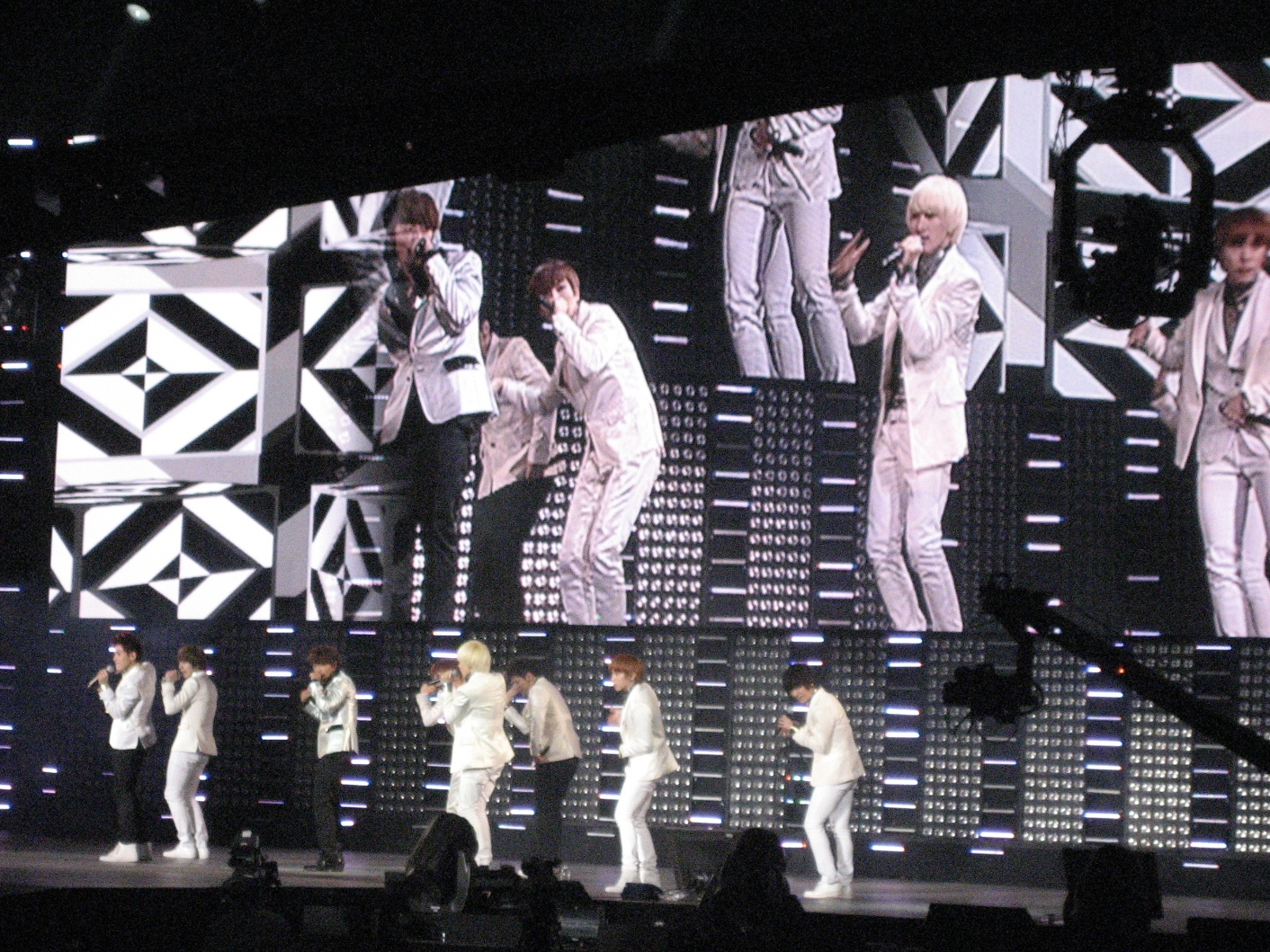
TVXQ and Korean group Super Junior (pictured above) collaborated in the Christmas single "Show Me Your Love." Super Junior members Heechul, Shindong, and Eunhyuk also co-wrote the song's rap verse.

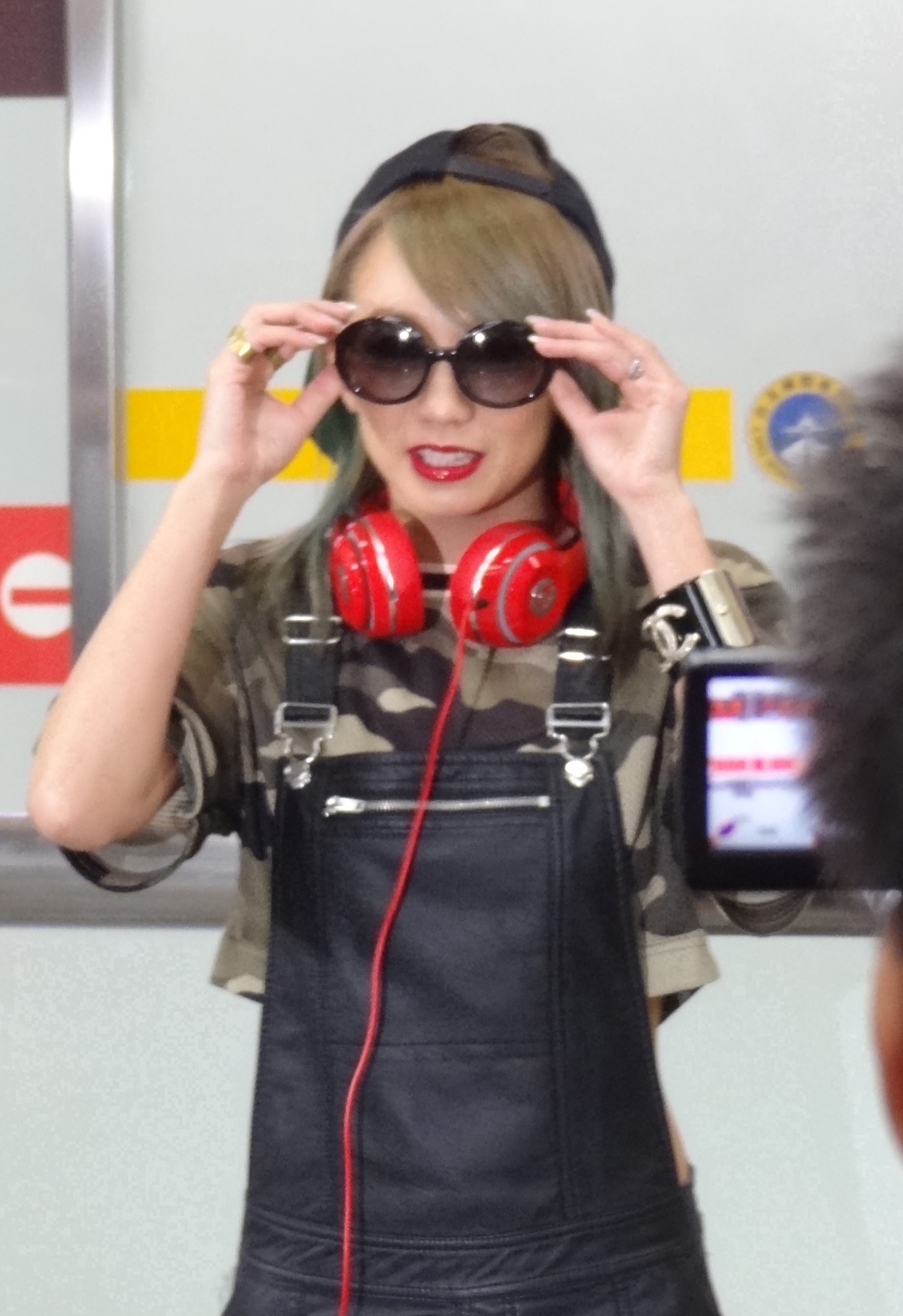
Japanese singer Kumi Koda wrote the lyrics to "Last Angel" and appeared as a lead vocalist.

Song	Artist(s)	Writer(s)	Originating album	Language	Year
"9095"	Tohoshinki	Kim Jae-joong	The Secret Code	Japanese	2009
"9096"	Tohoshinki	Kim Jae-joong	The Secret Code	Japanese	2009
"A Whole New World"	Tohoshinki	Alan Menken	Five in the Black	English	2007
"Ai o Motto" (愛をもっと)	Tohoshinki	Katsuhiko Yamamoto	Tree	Japanese	2014
"Aisenai Aishitai" (愛せない愛したい)	Tohoshinki	Yoshihiro Toyoshima, Maestro-T	Heart, Mind and Soul	Japanese	2006
"Aitakute Aitakute Tamaranai" (逢いたくて逢いたくてたまらない)	Tohoshinki	Shinjiroh Inoue	Time	Japanese	2013
"All In Vain"	TVXQ	An Ji-hong	Air City OST	Korean	2007
"Always There..."	TVXQ	Lee Yoon-jae	Rising Sun	Korean	2005
"Always With You"	TVXQ	Im Gwang-wook, Andrew Jackson, Martin Hoberg Hedegaard	Tense	Korean	2014
"Amaku Hateshinaku" (甘く果てしなく)	Tohoshinki		Best Selection 2010	Japanese	2009
"Android" †	Tohoshinki	Anders Grahn, Grace Tither	Time	Japanese	2012
"Angels We Have Heard on High"	TVXQ	Unknown	The Christmas Gift from TVXQ	Korean	2004
"Answer" †	Tohoshinki	UTA, Hiro, Sunny Bo	With	Japanese	2014
"Are You a Good Girl?"	TVXQ	Yoo Young-jin	Mirotic	Korean	2008
"Asu wa Kuru Kara" (明日は来るから) †	Tohoshinki	Takeshi Seno, Mai Osanai	Heart, Mind and Soul	Japanese	2006
"Asu wa Kuru Kara ～TOMORROW Version～" (明日は来るから) (Note: "Asu wa Kuru Kara" was first released in 2006 and was performed by TVXQ's former five-member lineup. In 2018, the current TVXQ duo re-recorded the song for their ninth album Tomorrow.)	Tohoshinki	Takeshi Seno, Mai Osanai	Tomorrow	Japanese	2018
"Athena"	TVXQ	Hwang Hyun	Keep Your Head Down	Korean	2011
"B.U.T (BE-AU-TY)"	Tohoshinki	Yoo Young-jin	Tone	Japanese	2011
"B.U.T (BE-AU-TY)"	TVXQ	Yoo Young-jin	Live World Tour: Catch Me in Seoul	Korean	2014
"Baby, Don't Cry"	Tohoshinki		With	Japanese	2014
"Back To Tomorrow"	Tohoshinki	White N3rd, Paul Lewis	Tone	Japanese	2011
"Balloons" †	TVXQ	Lee Doo-heon, Kim Sung-ho, Kenzie	"O"-Jung.Ban.Hap.	Korean	2006
"Beautiful Life"	TVXQ	Kim Young-hoo, Jamie Jones	Rising Sun	Korean	2005
"Beautiful Life"	Tohoshinki	Kim Young-hoo, Jamie Jones	T	Japanese	2008
"Beautiful You" †	Tohoshinki	H.U.B, Steve Smith, Anthony Anderson, Joleen Belle	The Secret Code	Japanese	2009
"Before U Go" †	TVXQ	Yoo Young-jin, Yoo Han-jin	Before U Go	Korean	2011
"Begin" †	Tohoshinki	Mai Osanai, Jin Nakamura	Five in the Black	Japanese	2006
"Begin ~Again Version~" (Note: "Begin" was first released in 2006 and was performed by TVXQ's original five-member lineup. Upon the completion of their military service in 2017, the duo re-recorded and included the song as the B-side to their 44th single, Reboot (2017).)	Tohoshinki	Mai Osanai, Jin Nakamura	Tomorrow	Japanese	2017
"Believe in U"	Tohoshinki	Shinjiroh Inoue	With	Japanese	2014
"Beside"	TVXQ	Albi Albertsson, Ricky Hanley, Stephan Elfgren	Tense	Korean	2014
"Blink"	Tohoshinki	Johan Gustafson, Fredrik Haggstam, Sebastian Lundberg, Andrew Jackson	Time	Japanese	2012
"Bolero" †	Tohoshinki	Daisuke Suzuki, Keiichi Tomita	The Secret Code	Japanese	2009
"Bolero" (Note: "Bolero" was first released in 2009 on the Japanese album The Secret Code and was performed by TVXQ's former five-member lineup. The current TVXQ duo re-recorded the single for their Japanese compilation album, FINE COLLECTION 〜Begin Again〜 (2017).)	Tohoshinki	Daisuke Suzuki, Keiichi Tomita	'FINE COLLECTION 〜Begin Again〜	Japanese	2017
"Boom Boom"	TVXQ with Super Junior and SHINee		2009 Summer SM Town – We are Shining	Korean	2009
"Bounce"	TVXQ	Lee Su-ran, Le'mon	New Chapter#1 : The Chance of Love	Korean	2018
"Box in the Ship"	Tohoshinki	Philippe-Marc, Anquetil, Iain James Farqharson, Marcus Killian, Yacine Azeggagh	The Secret Code	Japanese	2008
"Break Out!" †	Tohoshinki	masumi	Best Selection 2010	Japanese	2010
"Break Up the Shell"	Tohoshinki	Kenn Kato, H-Wonder	Heart, Mind and Soul	Japanese	2006
"Breeding Poison"	Tohoshinki	Lasse Lindorff, Daniel Rothmann, Harry Wilkins	Tree	Japanese	2014
"Broken"	TVXQ	Cho Yun-kyung	New Chapter#1 : The Chance of Love	Korean	2018
"Calling"	Tohoshinki	Takashi Iioka	With	Japanese	2014
"Catch Me" †	TVXQ	Yoo Young-jin	Catch Me	Korean	2012
"Catch Me -If You Wanna-" †	Tohoshinki	Yoo Young-jin	Time	Japanese	2013
"Champion"	Tohoshinki	Sean Alexander, Jeremy Thurber	Tree	Japanese	2014
"Chandelier"	Tohoshinki	Matthew Tishler, Andrew Underberg	With	Japanese	2014
"Cheering"	Tohoshinki	Shinjiroh Inoue	Tree	Japanese	2014
"Choosey Lover" †	Tohoshinki	Ryuichiro Yamaki	Five in the Black	Japanese	2007
"Christmas is Loving"	Tohoshinki	Philippe-Marc Anquetil, Christopher Lee-Joe, Danny Lattouf, Martin Scott Carre	With	Japanese	2014
"Circle (동행)"	TVXQ	JQ, Hyun Ji-won, Lee Ji-hye, Hwang Yoo-bin	New Chapter#2 : The Truth of Love	Korean	2018
"Clap!"	Tohoshinki	Figge Boström	T	Japanese	2008
"Close To You" †	TVXQ		The Secret Code	Japanese	2008
"Crazy"	TVXQ featuring Jay	Kim Tae-sung, Noday	Keep Your Head Down	Korean	2011
"Crazy Crazy Crazy"	Tohoshinki	Steven Lee, Andreas Stone Johansson, Fredrik Hult, Andreas Öberg	Tree	Japanese	2014
"Crazy Love"	TVXQ	Kim Young-hu	Mirotic	Korean	2008
"Crimson Saga"	Tohoshinki	H.U.B.	XV	Japanese	2019
"Dangerous Mind"	TVXQ	Yoo Young-jin	Rising Sun	Korean	2005
"Darkness Eyes"	Tohoshinki	Ryoji Sonoda	T	Japanese	2008
"Day Moon ~Harudal~" (ハルダル)	Tohoshinki		T	Japanese	2008
"Dead End"	Tohoshinki	Paul Drew, Greig Watts, Pate Barringer	Five in the Black	Japanese	2007
"Dear My Family" †	SM Town	Yoo Young-jin	I AM. OST	Korean	2012
"Destiny"	TVXQ	Kim Yi-na, Kim Tae-sung, Yim Gwang-wook, Andrew Choi	Catch Me	Korean	2012
"Dinner"	TVXQ	Oh Hyun-sun (lalala Studio)	2021 Winter SMTOWN : SMCU EXPRESS	Korean	2021
"Dirt"	Tohoshinki	Chris Wahle, Andreas Ohrn	With	Japanese	2014
"Disvelocity"	Tohoshinki		—N/a	Japanese	2013
"Dominus"	TVXQ	Lee Joo-hyung, Kim Yoo-seok	Rise as God	Korean	2015
"Don't Cry My Lover"	TVXQ	Kim Jae-joong, Jo Jun-young	Mirotic	Korean	2008
"Don't Say Goodbye"	TVXQ	Kim Ji-hoo, Kim Tae-seong	Mirotic	Korean	2008
"Dōshite Kimi o Suki ni Natte Shimattandarō?" (どうして君を好きになってしまったんだろう？) †	Tohoshinki	Lambsey, Fredro Odesjo, Sylvia Bennett-Smith, Mats Berntoft	The Secret Code	Japanese	2008
"Dōshite Kimi o Suki ni Natte Shimattandarō?" (どうして君を好きになってしまったんだろう？) (Note: "Dōshite Kimi o Suki ni Natte Shimattandarō?" was first released in 2008 on the Japanese album The Secret Code and was performed by TVXQ's former five-member lineup. The current TVXQ duo re-recorded the single for their Japanese compilation album, FINE COLLECTION 〜Begin Again〜 (2017).)	Tohoshinki	Lambsey, Fredro Odesjo, Sylvia Bennett-Smith, Mats Berntoft	'FINE COLLECTION 〜Begin Again〜	Japanese	2017
"Down"	TVXQ	Rokman, Benji Bae, Lockhome, PixelWave	20&2	Korean	2023
"Dream"	TVXQ	Jo Kwang-ho, Park Jung-won	Catch Me	Korean	2012
"Drive"	TVXQ		2004 Summer Vacation	Korean	2004
"Duet"	Tohoshinki	Shinjiroh Inoue	Tone	Japanese	2011
"Duet" (Winter version) †	Tohoshinki	Shinjiroh Inoue	—N/a	Japanese	2011
"Easy Mind"	Tohoshinki	Coach, greensleeves	Tone	Japanese	2011
"Electric Love"	Tohoshinki	H.U.B.	Tomorrow	Japanese	2018
"Epitaph ~for the future~" †	Tohoshinki	Hi-yunk	Epitaph	Japanese	2022
"Eternal"	Tohoshinki	Kosuke Morimoto, Jin Nakamura	Heart, Mind and Soul	Japanese	2006
"Evergreen"	TVXQ	Park Yu-chun (writer); Shim Chang-min (lyrics)	2007 Winter SM Town – Only Love	Korean	2007
"Everlasting" (Note: "Everlasting" is the Korean-language re-recording of "Toki o Tomete" (2010), TVXQ's last single as five members. The duo performed "Everlasting" for the first time at their Catch Me: Live World Tour in November 2012. The studio version was released in May 2014.)	TVXQ	Ichiro Fujiya (music); Shim Chang-min (lyrics)	Live World Tour: Catch Me in Seoul	Korean	2014
"Everyday"	Tohoshinki	H.U.B.	XV	Japanese	2019
"Everyday It Rains"	TVXQ	Jamie Jones, Oskar Cartaya	Rise as God	Korean	2015
"Fated"	Tohoshinki	Paul Drew, Greig Watts, Pete Barringer, Chris Wortley	Time	Japanese	2013
"Fighting Spirit of the East" †	TVXQ		—N/a	Korean	2006
"The First Noel"	TVXQ	Unknown	The Christmas Gift from TVXQ	Korean	2004
"Flower Lady"	TVXQ	Jo Yoon-kyeong	Mirotic	Korean	2008
"Force"	Tohoshinki	Adam Royce, Adolphus, Jason Gill	The Secret Code	Japanese	2009
"Forever Love" †	Tohoshinki	Ryoji Sonoda	T	Japanese	2007
"Free Your Mind"	TVXQ featuring the TRAX	Kim Young-hu, William Pyon, Ahn Ik-su	Rising Sun	Korean	2005
"Get Going"	Tohoshinki	H.U.B.	Tomorrow	Japanese	2018
"Get Me Some"	TVXQ	Tae Hoon, La Verdi, Thomas Charles, Phander, Daniel, Ahn Ik-su	"O"-Jung.Ban.Hap.	Korean	2006
"Getaway"	TVXQ	Kim Boo-min	Catch Me	Korean	2012
"Gonggan (Haneulgwa Badasai.. Whisper of..)"; 공간 (하늘과 바다사이.. Whisper of..)	TVXQ		—N/a	Korean	2005
"Good Days"	Tohoshinki	Shinjiroh Inoue	Tree	Japanese	2014
"Good Night"	TVXQ	Yoo Young-jin, Yoo Han-jin	Catch Me	Korean	2012
"Good-bye for Now"	Tohoshinki	Katerina Bramley, Obi Mhondera, Tim Hawes	Tree	Japanese	2014
"Gorgeous"	TVXQ	Kenzie, Andrew Choi	Catch Me	Korean	2012
"Gosenshi" (五線紙)	Tohoshinki		—N/a	Japanese	2007
"Guilty" †	Tohoshinki	Kelly, Hiro	XV	Japanese	2019
"Haptic Motion"	TVXQ with Girls' Generation		—N/a	Korean	2008
"Harudal" (하루달 Day Moon)	TVXQ		Air City OST	Korean	2007
"Heart, Mind and Soul" †	Tohoshinki	S.O.S	Heart, Mind and Soul	Japanese	2006
"Heartquake"	Super Junior featuring U-Know Yunho and Micky Yoochun	Jo Jun-young, Jung Yun-ho, Park Yu-chun	Sorry, Sorry	Korean	2009
"Hello"	Tohoshinki	H.U.B.	XV	Japanese	2019
"Hello Again"	Tohoshinki	Daisuke Suzuki, H-Wonder	Five in the Black	Japanese	2007
"Here I Stand"	TVXQ	Kim Young-hu	Humanoids	Korean	2012
"Hey! (Don't Bring Me Down)"	TVXQ	Yoo Young-jin	Mirotic	Korean	2008
"Hey! Girl"	TVXQ	Yoo Young-jin, Yoo Han-jin, Luther Squeak Jackson	"O"-Jung.Ban.Hap.	Korean	2006
"Hi Ya Ya Yeoreumnal" (Hi Ya Ya 여름날) †	TVXQ		—N/a	Korean	2005
"Hide & Seek" †	Tohoshinki	Kaoru Kondou	Tree	Japanese	2014
"High Time"	Tohoshinki	Jam, Masataka Kitaura	Five in the Black	Japanese	2006
"Holding Back the Tears"	TVXQ		Vacation OST	Korean	2006
"Hotaru no Namida" (ホタルの涙)	Tohoshinki	Mami Yamada	XV	Japanese	2019
"Hotmail" †	SM Town		04 Summer Vacation with SMTOWN.com	Korean	2004
"Hot Hot Hot" †	Tohoshinki	Kelly	XV	Japanese	2019
"Hot Sauce"	Tohoshinki	Kelly	XV	Japanese	2019
"How Are You"	TVXQ	Hwang Hyun	Catch Me	Korean	2012
"How Can I"	TVXQ	Park Chang-hyun	Keep Your Head Down	Korean	2011
"Hug" †	TVXQ	Park Chang-hyun	Tri-Angle	Korean	2004
"Hug" (International version)	Tohoshinki	Park Chang-hyun	Tri-Angle	English	2004
"Hug" (拥抱)	TVXQ	Park Chang-hyun	Tri-Angle	Mandarin	2005
"Hug"	Tohoshinki	Park Chang-hyun	Heart, Mind and Soul	Japanese	2006
"Humanoids" †	TVXQ	Kenzie	Humanoids	Korean	2012
"Humanoids"	Tohoshinki	Kenzie	Time	Japanese	2013
"I Don't Know"	Tohoshinki	Hitchhiker	Tone	Japanese	2011
"I Don't Know"	TVXQ	Hitchhiker	Catch Me	Korean	2012
"I Know"	Tohoshinki	Shinjiroh Inoue	Time	Japanese	2012
"I Just Can't Quit Myself"	Tohoshinki	Simon Westbrook, Jamie Sellers, James Winchester	With	Japanese	2014
"I Love You"	Tohoshinki	Katsuhiko Yamamoto	Tree	Japanese	2014
"I Never Let Go"	TVXQ		Tri-Angle	Korean	2004
"I Swear"	TVXQ	Mazeland	Catch Me	Korean	2012
"I Think U Know"	Tohoshinki	Nermin Harambasic, Robin Jenssen, Ronny Svendsen, Anne Judith Wik	Tone	Japanese	2011
"I Wanna Hold You"	TVXQ		—N/a	Korean	2005
"I Will..."	TVXQ	Yoon Sang	—N/a	Korean	2005
"If...!?" †	Tohoshinki		The Secret Code	Japanese	2008
"I'll Be There"	TVXQ	Hwang Seong-je	"O"-Jung.Ban.Hap.	Korean	2006
"I'll Be There"	Tohoshinki	Hwang Seong-je	Five in the Black	Japanese	2007
"In Our Time"	Tohoshinki	Shinjiroh Inoue	Time	Japanese	2013
"Introlude"	Tohoshinki	Yasuski Fukuyama	Heart, Mind and Soul	Japanese	2006
"Introduction ~magenta~"	Tohoshinki	Shinjiroh Inoue	Tone	Japanese	2011
"Jesus, Joy of Man's Desiring"	TVXQ		The Christmas Gift from TVXQ	English	2004
"Jigeum Cheoreom" (지금처럼)	TVXQ	Kenzie	Tri-Angle	Korean	2004
"Jealous" †	Tohoshinki	H.U.B.	XV	Japanese	2019
"Jelly Love"	TVXQ	January 8, JQ, Hyun Ji-won, MAYB, Shim Chang-min	New Chapter#2 : The Truth of Love	Korean	2018
"Journey"	TVXQ featuring Seohyun	Kim Dal-woo	Keep Your Head Down	Korean	2011
"Jumon -Mirotic-" (呪文-Mirotic-) †	Tohoshinki	Sigvardt, Mikkel Remee, Lucas Secon, Thomas Troelsen	The Secret Code	Japanese	2008
"Jungle" †	Tohoshinki	H.U.B.	Tomorrow	Japanese	2018
"Jungle"	TVXQ	Pink Slip, Inverness, MZMC	20&2	Korean	2023
"Keep Your Head Down" †	TVXQ	Yoo Young-jin, Yoo Han-jin	Keep Your Head Down	Korean	2011
"Keyword" †	Tohoshinki		The Secret Code	Japanese	2008
"Kimi no Inai Yoru" (君のいない夜)	Tohoshinki	Katsuhiko Yamamoto	—N/a	Japanese	2015
"Kiss The Baby Sky" †	Tohoshinki	Park Yu-chun	The Secret Code	Japanese	2009
"Kiss Shita Mama Sayonara" (Kissしたまま、さよなら)	Tohoshinki	Park Yu-chun, Kim Jae-joong	T	Japanese	2008
"Kkomaya" (꼬마야)	TVXQ	Ken Ingwersen, Jon Rydningen, Jeff Franzel, Marjorie Maye	Tri-Angle	Korean	2004
"Kotoba wa Iranai" (言葉はいらない)	Tohoshinki	Tatsutano Jun	Heart, Mind and Soul	Japanese	2006
"Last Angel" †	Kumi Koda featuring Tohoshinki	Negin, Ian-Paolo Lira, Hugo Lira, Thomas Gustafsson	Kingdom	Japanese	2007
"Last Angel" (Note: TVXQ re-recorded their own version of "Last Angel" for their third Japanese album, T (2008).)	Tohoshinki	Negin, Ian-Paolo Lira, Hugo Lira, Thomas Gustafsson	T	Japanese	2008
"Lazybones"	TVXQ	Park Chang-hyun	New Chapter#1 : The Chance of Love	Korean	2018
"Life's A Dance"	TVXQ	Lars Pedersen	20&2	Korean	2023
"Light My Moon Like This"	Tohoshinki	Katsuhiko Yamamoto	Epitaph	Japanese	2022
"Like a Soap"	TVXQ	Kenzie, Kim Jung-bae	Catch Me	Korean	2012
"Like Snow-White"	Tohoshinki	Ryan S. Jhun, Cimo Frankel, Rik Annema, Micah Ross Gordon	Epitaph	Japanese	2022
"Lime & Lemon" †	Tohoshinki	Caesar & Loui	—N/a	Japanese	2023
"Love After Love"	TVXQ	Lee Sang-in	Rising Sun	Korean	2005
"Love Again"	TVXQ	Kim Tae-sung, Andrew Choi, Fast Lane, Sky Beatz	Tense	Korean	2014
"Love Bye Love"	TVXQ	Park Yu-chun	Mirotic	Korean	2008
"Love in the Ice" †	Tohoshinki	Daisuke Suzuki	T	Japanese	2007
"Love in the Ice"	TVXQ	Daisuke Suzuki (writer); Shim Chang-min (lyrics)	Mirotic	Korean	2008
"Love Is..."	TVXQ	Minuki, Kim Seong-hoon	Rising Sun	Korean	2005
"Love is All I Need"	TVXQ	Lee Seung-jae, Jojo Bee	Rising Sun	Korean	2005
"Love is Never Gone"	TVXQ	Yoo Young-jin, Jack Kugell	Rising Sun	Korean	2005
"Love Line" †	TVXQ	Kim Min-ji, ZNEE	New Chapter#1 : The Chance of Love	Korean	2018
"Lovin' You" †	Tohoshinki	Sakai Mikio	T	Japanese	2007
"Lucky Star"	TVXQ	Hitchhiker	Rise as God	Korean	2015
"Magic Castle" †	TVXQ	Kim Gwang-jin	The Christmas Gift from TVXQ	Korean	2004
"Mahoroba"	Tohoshinki	Niclas Kings, Andy Love	Epitaph	Japanese	2022
"Make a Change"	Tohoshinki	Tsukiko Nakamura	Tomorrow	Japanese	2018
"Manazashi" †	Tohoshinki	Akihisa Matzura	—N/a	Japanese	2020
"Manipulate"	Tohoshinki	Kelly	XV	Japanese	2019
"Master"	Tohoshinki	Kelly	XV	Japanese	2019
"Maximum"	TVXQ	Yoo Young-jin	Keep Your Head Down	Korean	2011
"Maximum"	Tohoshinki	Yoo Young-jin	Tone	Japanese	2011
"Mekakushi" (目隠し)	Tohoshinki	Tsukiko Nakamura	XV	Japanese	2019
"Mideoyo" (믿어요) †	TVXQ	Park Chang-hyun	Tri-Angle	Korean	2004
"Million Men"	TVXQ		Tri-Angle	Korean	2004
"Mirotic" † (Note: In November 2008, the Korean Commission of Youth Protection ruled that the lyrics to "Mirotic" were too provocative and sexual for youths. TVXQ re-recorded the single and released its "clean version" in January 2009. The clean version was also remixed to an acoustic version, which was included in the Platinum Edition release of Mirotic in Taiwan.)	TVXQ	Sigvardt, Mikkel Remee, Lucas Secon, Thomas Troelsen	Mirotic	Korean	2008
"Mirotic"	TVXQ	Sigvardt, Mikkel Remee, Lucas Secon, Thomas Troelsen	Mirotic	Mandarin	2009
"Mirrors" †	Tohoshinki	Tsukiko Nakamura	XV	Japanese	2019
"Miss You" †	Tohoshinki	Daisuke Suzuki, H-Wonder	Five in the Black	Japanese	2006
"Morning Sun"	TVXQ	Hwang Hyun, Son Go-eun, JQ	New Chapter#2 : The Truth of Love	Korean	2018
"My Destiny" †	Tohoshinki	Mai Osanai, Akihisa Matsuura, Maestro-T	Heart, Mind and Soul	Japanese	2005
"My Little Princess" †	TVXQ	Go Young-jo	Tri-Angle	Korean	2004
"My Little Princess"	TVXQ	Go Young-jo	Tri-Angle	Mandarin	2005
"Nae Yeojachinguga Doeeojeullae?" (내 여자친구가 되어줄래?)	TVXQ	Tommy La Verdi, Daniel Pandher, EAR	Tri-Angle	Korean	2004
"Neon Eonjena" (넌 언제나)	TVXQ	Park Jung-won	Tri-Angle	Korean	2004
"No?"	Tohoshinki	Dane Deviller, Sean Hosein, Steve Smith, Anthony Anderson, Ibrahim Lakhani	T	Japanese	2008
"No Pain No Gain"	Tohoshinki	h-wonder	—N/a	Japanese	2006
"No Sympathy"	Tohoshinki	Henrik Nordenback, Christian Fast, Jimmy Claeson	—N/a	Japanese	2023
"Nobody Knows"	Tohoshinki	Nao Tanaka	The Secret Code	Japanese	2009
"Nothing Better"	TVXQ	John Paul Lam, Brandon Fraley (writers); Shim Chang-min (lyrics)	2009 Summer SM Town – We Are Shining	Korean	2009
"'O'-Jung.Ban.Hap." †	TVXQ	Yoo Young-jin	"O"-Jung.Ban.Hap.	Korean	2006
"'O'-Sei.Han.Gō." ("O"-正.反.合.) †	Tohoshinki	Yoo Young-jin	Five in the Black	Japanese	2006
"Ocean" †	Tohoshinki	Shinjiroh Inoue	Tree	Japanese	2013
"Oh Holy Night"	TVXQ featuring BoA	Adolphe Adam	—N/a	English	2004
"Off-Road" (Note: "Off-Road" is the Korean-language re-recording of "Runnin' On Empty", which was first recorded in 2011 for the original soundtrack of Make Your Move (2013).)	TVXQ	Peter Habib, Marc Joseph, Adam Nierow, Yaroslav Vynnytsky	Tense	Korean	2014
"On & On"	TVXQ	Great Dane	"O"-Jung.Ban.Hap.	Korean	2006
"One"	TVXQ	Kenzie	Rising Sun	Korean	2005
"One"	Tohoshinki	Kenzie	Heart, Mind and Soul	Japanese	2006
"One and Only One"	Tohoshinki	Peter Kvint, Jonas Myrin	Time	Japanese	2013
"One More Thing"	Tohoshinki	her0ism	Time	Japanese	2012
"Ongdalsaem" (옹달샘)	TVXQ	Kenzie	—N/a	Korean	2004
"Only For You"	TVXQ	Lee Hee-jun, Lee Su-ran	New Chapter#1 : The Chance of Love	Korean	2018
"Our Game"	TVXQ	William Edward Simister, Tim Hawes, Obi Simbarashe Mhondera, Stuart Priddle	Keep Your Head Down	Korean	2011
"Paradise"	TVXQ	Kelvin Kumar, Sean Kumar	Mirotic	Korean	2008
"Parallel Parallel" †	Tohoshinki	Alexander Karlsson, Alexei Viktorovitch	—N/a	Japanese	2023
"Pay It Forward"	Tohoshinki	H.U.B.	XV	Japanese	2019
"Phantom"	TVXQ	Kenzie	"O"-Jung.Ban.Hap.	Korean	2006
"Picture of You"	TVXQ	Marcus Jilla, James Hollands, James Critcher (writers); Kim Jun-su (lyrics)	Mirotic	Korean	2008
"Promise"	TVXQ	Trackside	20&2	Korean	2023
"Proud"	Tohoshinki	Jin Nakamura	Five in the Black	Japanese	2007
"Purple Line" †	Tohoshinki	Yoo Han-jin, Yoo Young-jin, JJ650	T	Japanese	2008
"Purple Line"	TVXQ	Yoo Han-jin, Yoo Young-jin, JJ650	—N/a	Korean	2008
"Rainbow"	Tohoshinki	N.Davidovich, H.Nadal, Darrell Pittman	T	Japanese	2008
"Rainbow"	TVXQ	Kenzie	Mirotic	Korean	2008
"Rat Tat Tat"	Tohoshinki	Adam Nierow, Peter Habib, Ryan Marrone, Garrick "Smitty" Smith	Time	Japanese	2013
"Reboot" †	Tohoshinki	Obi Mhondera, Christopher Wortley, DWB, Hide Nakamura	Tomorrow	Japanese	2018
"Rebel" †	TVXQ	Moonshine, Kenzie	20&2	Korean	2023
"Refuse to Lose"	Tohoshinki	Philippe-Marc Anquetil, Christopher Lee-Joe, Danny Lattouf, Martin Scott Carre	With	Japanese	2014
"Ride On" †	Tohoshinki	Philippe-Marc Anquetil, Christopher Lee-Joe, Iain James Farquharson	T	Japanese	2007
"Rise..."	TVXQ	Jarkko Ehnqvist, Pessi Levanto, Martin Mulholland (writers); Shim Chang-min (lyrics)	Tense	Korean	2014
"Rising Sun" †	TVXQ	Yoo Young-jin	Rising Sun	Korean	2005
"Rising Sun"	TVXQ	Yoo Young-jin	Rising Sun	Mandarin	2005
"Rising Sun" †	Tohoshinki	Yoo Young-jin	Heart, Mind and Soul	Japanese	2006
"Rising Sun (Re-recording Version)" (Note: "Rising Sun" was first released in 2006 on Heart, Mind and Soul and was performed by TVXQ's former five-member lineup. The TVXQ duo re-recorded the single for their Japanese compilation album, FINE COLLECTION 〜Begin Again〜 (2017).)	Tohoshinki	m.c.A・T	'FINE COLLECTION 〜Begin Again〜	Japanese	2017
"Road" †	Tohoshinki	KOH, Shinjiroh Inoue	Tomorrow	Japanese	2018
"Rodeo"	TVXQ	Mike Woods	20&2	Korean	2023
"Rumor"	TVXQ	Outsidaz	Keep Your Head Down	Korean	2011
"Runaway" †	Tohoshinki	Akira	The Secret Code	Japanese	2008
"Runnin' On Empty" (Note: "Runnin' On Empty" was first recorded in 2011 for the film Make Your Move (2013). The original soundtrack was released in 2014.)	TVXQ	Peter Habib, Marc Joseph, Adam Nierow, Yaroslav Vynnytsky	Make Your Move (Original Motion Picture Soundtrack)	English	2014
"Sakuramichi" (サクラミチ) †	Tohoshinki	Katsuhiko Yamamoto	—N/a	Japanese	2015
"Santa Claus is Comin' to Town"	TVXQ	John Frederick Coots, Haven Gillespie	The Christmas Gift from TVXQ	English	2004
"Scream" †	Tohoshinki	Hitchhiker	Tree	Japanese	2013
"Secret Game"	Tohoshinki	Akira	The Secret Code	Japanese	2009
"Sennen Koi Uta" (千年恋歌) †	Tohoshinki	Joe Hisaishi	The Secret Code	Japanese	2008
"Sentimental Mood"	Tohoshinki	Sofia Vivere, Elias Oberg, SUA(153/Joombas), RHeaT	—N/a	Japanese	2023
"Share the World" †	Tohoshinki	Kenichi Maeyamada	The Secret Code	Japanese	2009
"She"	TVXQ	Matthew Tishler, Amy Powers, Liz Rodrigues	Keep Your Head Down	Korean	2011
"Shiawase Iro no Hana" (シアワセ色の花)	Tohoshinki	Katsuhiko Yamamoto	Tone	Japanese	2011
"Shine" †	Tohoshinki	Reo	T	Japanese	2007
"Shinjiru Mama" (信じるまま)	Tohoshinki	Steven Lee, Drew Ryan Scott	Tree	Japanese	2014
"Show Me Your Love" †	TVXQ with Super Junior	Kenzie, Kim Hee-chul, Shindong, Eunhyuk	—N/a	Korean	2005
"Showtime"	Tohoshinki	H.U.B.	Tomorrow	Japanese	2018
"Silent Night Holy Night"	TVXQ	Franz Gruber	The Christmas Gift from TVXQ	Korean	2004
"Six In the Morning"	Tohoshinki	Kelly	XV	Japanese	2019
"Sky" †	Tohoshinki	h-wonder	Five in the Black	Japanese	2006
"Sleigh Ride"	TVXQ	Leroy Anderson	Winter: The Warmest Gift	English	2011
"Small Talk" †	Tohoshinki	Shinjiro Inoue	Epitaph	Japanese	2022
"Smile"	TVXQ	Teddy Riley, DOM, Lee Hyun-seung, Daniel Obi Klein, J.SOL	Rise as God	Korean	2015
"Smoky Heart"	TVXQ	Brian Kennedy, Dewain Whitmore	Tense	Korean	2014
"Song for You" †	Tohoshinki	Hara Kazuhiro	T	Japanese	2007
"Somebody to Love" †	Tohoshinki	Kei Haneoka	Heart, Mind and Soul	Japanese	2005
"Somebody to Love" (2011 version) (Note: "Somebody to Love" was first released in 2005 and was performed by TVXQ's original five-member lineup. In 2011, the duo re-recorded the single and included it as a bonus track in their first Japanese album as a duo, Tone (2011).)	Tohoshinki	Kei Haneoka	Tone	Japanese	2011
"Something" †	TVXQ	Yoo Young-jin, Yoo Han-jin	Tense	Korean	2014
"Something" †	Tohoshinki	Yoo Young-jin, Yoo Han-jin	Tree	Japanese	2014
"Sooner Than Later"	TVXQ featuring The Quiett	Kenzie, The Quiett	New Chapter#2 : The Truth of Love	Korean	2018
"Special One"	Tohoshinki	Andreas Oberg, Caesar & Loui, Olof Lindskog	With	Japanese	2014
"Spellbound" †	TVXQ	Yoo Young-jin	Spellbound	Korean	2014
"Spinning"	Tohoshinki	Lubo Slavicek, Katerina Bramley, Ninos Hanna	With	Japanese	2014
"Stand by U" †	Tohoshinki	UTA, REO	Best Selection 2010	Japanese	2009
"Stand Up!"	Tohoshinki	Jan Kask, Luciano Peirone, Peter Mansson	The Secret Code	Japanese	2009
"Starlight"	TVXQ	Jisoo Park(153/Joombas), Kyum Lyk	20&2	Korean	2023
"Stay with Me Tonight" †	Tohoshinki	Kei Haneoka, Maestro-T	Heart, Mind and Soul	Japanese	2005
"Step by Step" †	Tohoshinki	Hara Kazuhiro	Five in the Black	Japanese	2007
"Steppin'"	TVXQ	Im Gwang-wook, Andrew Jackson, Martin Hoberg Hedegaard	Tense	Korean	2014
"Still" †	Tohoshinki	Shinjiroh Inoue	Time	Japanese	2013
"Storm Chaser"	Tohoshinki	Tania Doko, Jorgen Elofsson, David Musumeci, Anthony Egizii	Epitaph	Japanese	2022
"Summer Dream" †	Tohoshinki	Tatta Works	T	Japanese	2007
"Sun & Rain"	TVXQ	Shim Chang-min, JQ, Lee Ji-hye	New Chapter#1 : The Chance of Love	Korean	2018
"Superstar" †	Tohoshinki	Lars Halvor Jensen, Johannes Joergensen, Drew Ryan Scott, Lindy Robbins	Tone	Japanese	2011
"Surisuri (Spellbound)"	Tohoshinki	Yoo Young-jin	With	Japanese	2014
"Survivor" †	Tohoshinki	Iain James, Robert Habolin, Adam Powers	The Secret Code	Japanese	2009
"Sweat" †	Tohoshinki	Hanif Sabzevar, Kevin Borg, Nicklas Eklun	With	Japanese	2014
"Take Your Hands"	Tohoshinki	SteveSmith, Anthony Anderson, Jenson David Aubrey Vaughan, Creig Smart	—N/a	Japanese	2009
"Taxi"	Tohoshinki	Jan Kask, Luciano Peirone, Peter Mansson	The Secret Code	Japanese	2009
"Tea for Two"	Tohoshinki	Ichiro Fujiya	—N/a	Japanese	2009
"Telephone"	Tohoshinki	Michele, Vice-Maslin, C.J. Vanston, Matt Tryggestad	Tone	Japanese	2011
"Ten (10 Years)"	TVXQ	Yoo Young-jin	Tense	Korean	2014
"Thanks To"	TVXQ	Lee Sang-in	Tri-Angle	Korean	2004
"Thank You My Girl"	Tohoshinki	John Paul Lam, Tony Oh, Akil Thompson	Tone	Japanese	2011
"The Chance of Love" †	TVXQ	Yoo Young Jin, Haris, Lorenzo Fragola & Jihad Rahmouni	New Chapter#1 : The Chance of Love	Korean	2018
"The Chance of Love"	Tohoshinki	H.U.B.	Tomorrow	Japanese	2018
"The Reflex"	Tohoshinki	Hi-yunk	—N/a	Japanese	2022
"The Story Has Begun"	TVXQ	Park Chang-hak, Yunsang	"O"-Jung.Ban.Hap.	Korean	2006
"The Way U Are" †	TVXQ	Robert Zuddas	Tri-Angle	Korean	2004
"The Way U Are"	TVXQ	Robert Zuddas	Tri-Angle	Mandarin	2005
"The Way U Are"	Tohoshinki	Robert Zuddas	—N/a	Japanese	2006
"This is My Love"	Tohoshinki	Kelly	Tomorrow	Japanese	2018
"Time Works Wonders" †	Tohoshinki	Peter Gordeno, Jamie Hartman	With	Japanese	2014
"Together" †	Tohoshinki	Hara Hiroaki	T	Japanese	2007
"Toki o Tomete" †	Tohoshinki	Ichiro Fujiya	Best Selection 2010	Japanese	2010
"Tonight" †	TVXQ	Yoo Han-jin	Rising Sun	Korean	2005
"Top of the World"	TVXQ	Yoo Young-jin	Rise as God	Korean	2015
"Tree of Life"	Tohoshinki	Anders Grahn, Carlos Okabe	Tree	Japanese	2014
"Tri-Angle" †	TVXQ featuring BoA and the TRAX	Yoo Young-jin	Tri-Angle	Korean	2004
"Tri-Angle" (三角·魔力)	TVXQ featuring BoA and the TRAX	Yoo Young-jin	Tri-Angle	Mandarin	2005
"Trick"	Tohoshinki	Akira	T	Japanese	2008
"Trigger"	Tohoshinki	H.U.B., Matthew Tishler, Andrew Underberg, Allison Kaplan	Tomorrow	Japanese	2018
"Truth" †	TVXQ	Kyung Jin-hee	New Chapter#2 : The Truth of Love	Korean	2018
"Try My Love"	Tohoshinki	Masaya Wada	—N/a	Japanese	2005
"Two Hearts" †	Tohoshinki	Akira	The Secret Code	Japanese	2008
"Unforgettable"	TVXQ	Hwang Seong-je	Rising Sun	Korean	2005
"Unforgettable"	TVXQ	Hwang Seong-je	Rising Sun	Mandarin	2005
"Utsuroi" †	Tohoshinki	Esme Mori, Katsuhiko Yamamoto	—N/a	Japanese	2022
"Vertigo"	TVXQ	Max Schneider, Dillon Pace, Jenna Andrew, Outer Earth Productions	Rise as God	Korean	2015
"Very Merry Xmas" †	Tohoshinki	Chris Buseck, Tom Hugo Hemansen	Tree	Japanese	2013
"Viva"	TVXQ	The Underdogs	Catch Me	Korean	2012
"Wake Me Up"	TVXQ	realmeee	New Chapter#1 : The Chance of Love	Korean	2018
"Wasurenaide" (忘れないで) †	Tohoshinki	Kim Jae-joong, Kim Young-hu	The Secret Code	Japanese	2009
"We Are!" †	Tohoshinki	Kouhei Tanaka	The Secret Code	Japanese	2009
"Wedding Dress"	Tohoshinki	SHIROSE, DJ first, SHIMADA	—N/a	Japanese	2013
"Weep"	Tohoshinki	solaya	Tone	Japanese	2011
"Whatever They Say" †	TVXQ	William Pyon, Kim Young-hu	Tri-Angle	Korean	2004
"White"	Tohoshinki	Shinjiroh Inoue	—N/a	Japanese	2013
"White Lie..."	TVXQ		"O"-Jung.Ban.Hap.	Korean	2006
"Why? (Keep Your Head Down)" †	Tohoshinki	Yoo Young-jin, Yoo Han-jin	Tone	Japanese	2011
"Winter Rose" †	Tohoshinki	Jeff Miyahara, Erik Lidbom	Time	Japanese	2011
"Wish"	TVXQ featuring Ryeowook and Kyuhyun		Mirotic	Korean	2008
"With All My Heart"	Tohoshinki	Shinjiroh Inoue	Best Selection 2010	Japanese	2010
"Without You"	TVXQ	Lee Su-ran	New Chapter#1 : The Chance of Love	Korean	2018
"With Love"	Tohoshinki	Shinjiroh Inoue	With	Japanese	2014
"Wo Xiangxin" (我相信) (Note: "Wo Xiangxin" is the Mandarin-language re-recording of "Mideoyo" (Tri-Angle (Hong Kong and Taiwan Edition), 2005).)	TVXQ	Lee Sang-in	Tri-Angle	Mandarin	2005
"Wrong Number" †	TVXQ	Marvin Ambrosius, Christopher Lee Joe, Iain James, Philippe Anquetil	Mirotic	Korean	2008
"Y3K"	Tohoshinki	Mattias Lindblom, Anders Wollbeck	Time	Japanese	2013
"Yakusoku" (約束)	Tohoshinki	Kentaro Fukushi	Five in the Black	Japanese	2007
"Yeohaenggi" (여행기)	TVXQ	John	2007 Winter SM Town – Only Love	Korean	2007
"Yippie Ki Yay"	Tohoshinki	Kelly	Tomorrow	Japanese	2018
"You Only Love"	TVXQ	Lee Yun-jae	"O"-Jung.Ban.Hap.	Korean	2006
"Your Man"	TVXQ	Kenzie, Kim Jung-bae	Tense	Korean	2014
"Your Song"	Tohoshinki	Akihisa Matzura	—N/a	Japanese	2020
"You're My Melody	TVXQ	JV, Sean Alexander, Pascal "Claps" Guyon	Mirotic	Korean	2008
"You're My Miracle"	TVXQ	Kim Young-hu	"O"-Jung.Ban.Hap.	Korean	2006
"You're My Miracle"	Tohoshinki	Kim Young-hu	T	Japanese	2008
"Yuki Furu Yoru no Barādo" (雪降る夜のバラード)	Tohoshinki	Katsuhiko Yamamoto	XV	Japanese	2019
"Zion"	Tohoshinki	Curtis Richardson, Iain James, Chris Lee Jo, Rob Davis	Five in the Black	Japanese	2007

== Sample and cover versions ==
- American singer Wayne Brady covered "Beautiful Life" in 2007 is called Ordinary (Beautiful Ordinary Life) in full English version.
- Asian American singer Erik Carlson (half Finnish and Half Filipino as Finnapino)) of XPREIMENTAL ENTERTAINMENT sampled both TVXQ's "Beautiful Life" and Wayne Brady's "Ordinary" called "There U Are" in his self titled album in 2007.

== See also ==
- TVXQ singles discography
- TVXQ albums discography
- List of awards and nominations received by TVXQ
