= TVXQ albums discography =

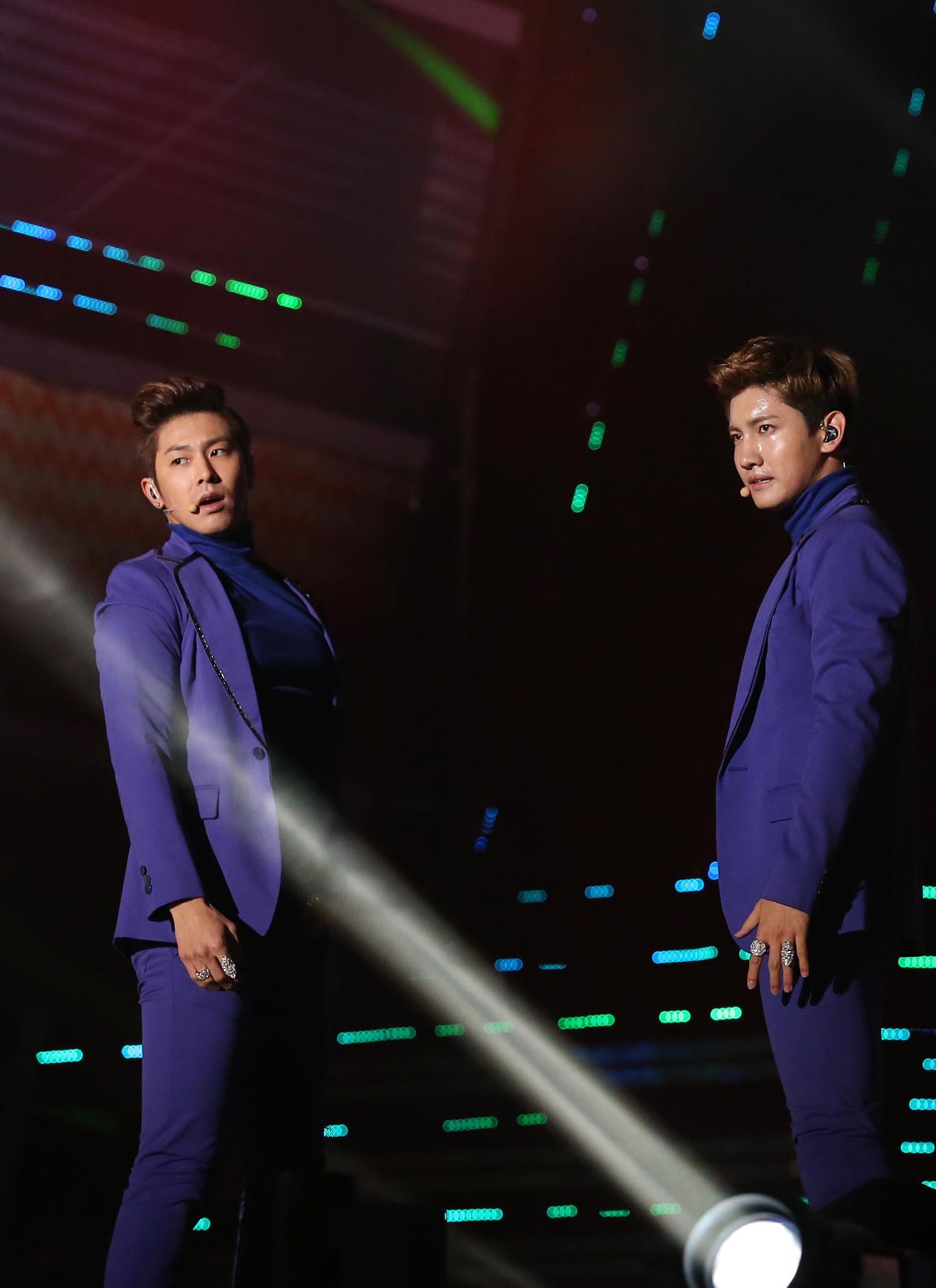
- TVXQ performing during the K-Pop World Festival, 2012
- Studio albums: 20
- Extended plays: 3
- Soundtrack albums: 1
- Live albums: 10
- Compilation albums: 4
- Remix albums: 4
- Box sets: 1

South Korean pop group TVXQ, known as Tohoshinki (東方神起, Tōhōshinki) in Japanese releases, have released twenty studio albums (four which were re-released under different titles), three extended plays (released as "special albums" or "mini albums"), four compilation albums, ten live albums, four remix albums, one soundtrack album and one box set. The group has sold over 14 million physical records since 2004, including 9.4 million in Japan, making them one of the best-selling K-pop acts of all time.

TVXQ released their debut single "Hug" in January 2004. Their first studio album Tri-Angle (2004) debuted at number one on the Monthly Albums Chart by the Music Industry Association of Korea (MIAK), starting a winning streak of number-one albums for the group in the country. Influenced by their label mate BoA, TVXQ crossed over to the Japanese music industry in 2005, and released their debut Japanese studio album Heart, Mind and Soul in March 2006. The album had mediocre success overall, peaking at number twenty-five on the Oricon Albums Chart, selling less than 10,000 copies. However, sales improved for their second Japanese album Five in the Black (2007), which peaked at number ten on the Oricon. Their third Japanese album T, released in January 2008, was TVXQ's first gold-certified album from the Recording Industry Association of Japan (RIAJ). In between their early J-pop endeavors, they issued two more Korean albums Rising Sun (2005) and "O"-Jung.Ban.Hap. (2006), both being best-selling top-charters in K-pop music charts across Asia.

In September 2008, the group released their fourth Korean studio album Mirotic, their most critically successful and best-selling album to date. It is the first Korean album in four years to break past half a million copies, and was the highest-selling Korean album of the year across Asia that year. In March 2009, TVXQ released their fourth Japanese album The Secret Code, their first platinum-certified album by the RIAJ. A year later, TVXQ achieved their first number-one record in Japan with the release of their Japanese greatest hits album Best Selection 2010, the fastest-selling and best-selling album of their career. It achieved a double platinum certification from the RIAJ after only a month of release.

After a two year hiatus, TVXQ returned as a duo with their fifth Korean album Keep Your Head Down (2011), which debuted at number one on the Gaon Albums Chart. In September, the duo issued TVXQ's fifth Japanese album Tone, which became TVXQ's first regular studio album to top the Oricon, breaking a sales record previously set by Bon Jovi. The duo's next studio efforts, the Korean album Catch Me (2012) and the Japanese album Time (2013) were major commercial successes and chart toppers, the latter being TVXQ's fastest-selling regular album in Japan.

TVXQ's commercial success continued with the release of their seventh Korean studio album Tense (2014), which was TVXQ's fastest-selling Korean album since Mirotic in 2008. The release of TVXQ's tenth Japanese album XV (2019) pushed TVXQ to be the first international artist in Japan to have six number-one studio albums in a row

== Studio albums ==
=== Korean studio albums ===
List of Korean studio albums, with selected chart positions, sales figures and certifications
Title	Album details	Peak chart positions				Sales
Title	Album details	KOR^{[A]}	JPN	TW	US World	Sales
Tri-Angle	Released: October 13, 2004; Label: SM Entertainment; Formats: Cassette, CD, VCD, digital download	35 (Note: According to the Music Industry Association of Korea (MIAK), which stopped compiling data after 2008, Tri-Angle peaked at number one on the monthly chart of October 2004. The album entered the Gaon Album Chart in 2010 and peaked at number 35 for the week of February 21–27, 2010.)	93	—	—	KOR: 318,284
Rising Sun	Released: September 12, 2005; Label: SM Entertainment; Formats: Cassette, CD, digital download	34 (Note: Rising Sun peaked at number one on the MIAK monthly chart of September 2005. The album entered the Gaon Album Chart in 2010 and peaked at number 34 for the week of April 18–24, 2010.)	—	—	—	KOR: 304,461
"O"-Jung.Ban.Hap.	Released: September 29, 2006; Label: SM Entertainment; Formats: Cassette, CD, DVD, digital download	5 (Note: "O"-Jung.Ban.Hap. peaked at number one on the MIAK monthly chart of September 2006 and November 2006. The album entered the Gaon Music Chart in 2010 and peaked at number five for the week of January 3–9, 2010.)	—	5	—	KOR: 479,710
Mirotic	Released: September 26, 2008; Label: SM Entertainment; Formats: CD, DVD, digital download	1 (Note: Mirotic peaked at number one on the MIAK monthly chart of September 2008 and November 2008. The album entered the Gaon Album Chart in 2010 and peaked at number 10 for the week of April 25 to May 1, 2010.)	—	2	—	KOR: 594,649
Keep Your Head Down	Released: January 5, 2011; Label: SM Entertainment; Formats: CD, DVD, digital download	1	4	4	—	KOR: 275,123; JPN: 51,940
Catch Me	Released: September 24, 2012; Label: SM Entertainment; Formats: CD, DVD, digital download	1	14	7	6	KOR: 261,786; JPN: 69,090
Tense	Released: January 6, 2014; Label: SM Entertainment; Formats: CD, digital download	1	4	16	2	KOR: 199,502; JPN: 51,572
New Chapter #1: The Chance of Love	Released: March 28, 2018; Label: SM Entertainment; Formats: CD, digital download	1	7	—	—	KOR: 146,620; JPN: 12,519
20&2	Released: December 26, 2023; Label: SM Entertainment; Formats: CD, digital download	3	11	—	—	KOR: 109,621; JPN: 3,402
"—" denotes releases that did not chart or were not released in that region.

=== Japanese studio albums ===
List of Japanese studio albums, with selected chart positions, sales figures and certifications
Title	Album details	Peak chart positions			Sales	Certifications
Title	Album details	KOR^{[A]}	JPN	TW	Sales	Certifications
Heart, Mind and Soul	Released: March 23, 2006; Label: Rhythm Zone; Formats: CD, DVD, digital download	68 (Note: Heart, Mind and Soul entered the Gaon Album Chart in 2010 and peaked at number 68 for the week of March 21–27, 2010.)	25	—	JPN: 36,397; KOR: 29,947	
Five in the Black	Release: March 14, 2007; Label: Rhythm Zone; Formats: CD, DVD, digital download	—	10	6	JPN: 62,362; KOR: 25,750	RIAJ: Gold
T	Released: January 23, 2008; Label: Rhythm Zone; Formats: CD, DVD, digital download	—	4	4	JPN: 158,524; KOR: 56,983	RIAJ: Gold
The Secret Code	Released: March 25, 2009; Label: Rhythm Zone; Formats: CD, DVD, digital download	—	2	1	JPN: 317,699	RIAJ: Platinum
Tone	Released: September 28, 2011; Label: Avex Trax; Formats: CD, DVD, digital download	4	1	5	JPN: 331,600; KOR: 11,765	RIAJ: Platinum
Time	Released: March 6, 2013; Label: Avex Trax; Formats: CD, DVD, digital download	6	1	15	JPN: 298,389; KOR: 16,229	RIAJ: Platinum
Tree	Released: March 5, 2014; Label: Avex Trax; Formats: CD, DVD, digital download	15	1	9	JPN: 265,013; KOR: 33,644	RIAJ: Platinum
With	Released: December 17, 2014; Label: Avex Trax; Formats: CD, DVD, digital download	7	1	—	JPN: 266,824; KOR: 2,206	RIAJ: Platinum
Tomorrow	Released: September 19, 2018; Label: Avex Trax; Formats: CD, Blu-ray, DVD, digital download	—	1	—	JPN: 153,262	RIAJ: Gold
XV	Released: October 16, 2019; Label: Avex Trax; Formats: CD, Blu-ray, DVD, digital download	—	1	—	JPN: 184,201	RIAJ: Gold
Zone	Released: November 6, 2024; Label: Avex Trax; Formats: CD, Blu-ray, DVD, digital download	—	5	—	JPN: 50,459 (Phy.); JPN: 2,391(Dig.)	
"—" denotes releases that did not chart or were not released in that region.

=== Reissues ===
List of reissues, with selected details, chart positions, sales figures
Title	Album details	Peak chart positions	Sales
Title	Album details	KOR	Sales
Mirotic Special Edition	Released: November 12, 2008; Re-released (clean): January 5, 2009; Label: SM Entertainment; Formats: CD, digital download	—	
Before U Go	Released: March 16, 2011; Label: SM Entertainment; Formats: CD, digital download	1	KOR: 70,569
Humanoids	Released: November 26, 2012; Label: SM Entertainment; Formats: CD, digital download	1	KOR: 99,492
Spellbound	Released: February 27, 2014; Label: SM Entertainment; Formats: CD, digital download	2	KOR: 116,820
"—" denotes releases that did not chart or were not released in that region.

== Special albums ==
List of special albums, with selected chart positions, sales figures and certifications
Title	Details	Peak chart positions		Sales
Title	Details	KOR^{[A]}	JPN	Sales
The Christmas Gift from TVXQ	Released: December 6, 2004 (KOR); Label: SM Entertainment; Type: EP; Formats: Cassette, CD, digital download	6 (Note: Released in 2004, The Christmas Gift from TVXQ entered the Gaon Album Chart in 2010 and peaked at number six for the week of April 18–24, 2010.)	—	KOR: 68,888
Rise as God	Released: July 20, 2015 (KOR); Label: SM Entertainment; Type: LP; Formats: CD, digital download	1	6	KOR: 199,502; JPN: 34,396
New Chapter #2: The Truth of Love	Released: December 26, 2018 (KOR); Label: SM Entertainment; Type: EP; Formats: CD, digital download	2	12	KOR: 106,590; JPN: 12,960
Epitaph	Released: March 16, 2022 (JPN); Label: Avex Trax; Type: EP; Formats: CD, digital download	—	3	JPN: 46,095 (Phy.); JPN: 2,728 (Dig.)
"—" denotes releases that did not chart or were not released in that region.

== Compilation albums ==
List of compilation albums, with selected chart positions, sales figures and certifications
Title	Album details	Peak chart positions			Sales	Certifications
Title	Album details	KOR^{[A]}	JPN	TW	Sales	Certifications
Best Selection 2010	Released: February 17, 2010 (JPN); Label: Rhythm Zone; Formats: CD, DVD, digital download	1	1	2	JPN: 569,530; KOR: 21,089	RIAJ: 2× Platinum
Complete Single A-Side Collection	Released: June 30, 2010 (JPN); Label: Rhythm Zone; Format: CD	8	3	12	JPN: 106,265; KOR: 3,729	RIAJ: Gold
Single B-Side Collection	Released: June 30, 2010 (JPN); Label: Rhythm Zone; Format: CD	7	4	18	JPN: 100,729; KOR: 2,978	
Fine Collection: Begin Again	Released: October 25, 2017 (JPN); Label: Avex Trax; Formats: CD, DVD, Blu-ray, digital download	—	1	—	JPN: 167,259	RIAJ: Gold
"—" denotes releases that did not chart or were not released in that region.

== Live albums ==
=== Korean live albums ===
List of Korean live albums, with selected chart positions and sales figures
Title	Album details	Peak chart positions			Sales
Title	Album details	KOR^{[A]}	JPN	TW	Sales
The 1st Live Concert Album: Rising Sun	Released: July 12, 2006; Label: SM Entertainment; Format: CD	13 (Note: Released in 2006, The 1st Live Concert Album: Rising Sun peaked at number 13 on the Gaon Album Chart for the week of April 18–24, 2010.)	—	—	KOR: 31,862
The 2nd Asia Tour Concert Album "O"	Released: June 18, 2007; Label: SM Entertainment; Format: CD	18 (Note: Released in 2007, The 2nd Asia Tour Concert Album "O" peaked at number 37 on the Gaon Album Chart for the week of May 23–29, 2010.)	—	14	KOR: 24,904
The 3rd Asia Tour Concert Mirotic	Released: July 30, 2009; Label: SM Entertainment; Format: CD	4 (Note: Released in 2009, The 3rd Asia Tour Concert Mirotic peaked at number five on the Gaon Album Chart for the week of January 10–16, 2010.)	—	11	
The 4th World Tour "Catch Me" Live Album	Released: May 22, 2014; Label: SM Entertainment; Formats: CD, digital download	3	19	—	KOR: 28,106; JPN: 16,489
"—" denotes releases that did not chart or were not released in that region.

=== Japanese live albums ===
List of Japanese live albums, with selected chart positions and sales figures
Title	Album details	Peak chart positions	Sales
Title	Album details	JPN	Sales
Tohoshinki Live CD Collection ~Heart, Mind and Soul~	Released: December 15, 2010; Label: Rhythm Zone; Format: CD	—	JPN: 95,096
Tohoshinki Live CD Collection ~Five in the Black in Nippon Budokan 1 Nichime~	Released: December 15, 2010; Label: Rhythm Zone; Format: CD	—	JPN: 163,856
Tohoshinki Live CD Collection ~T~	Released: December 15, 2010; Label: Rhythm Zone; Format: CD	2	JPN: 204,127
Tohoshinki Live CD Collection ~The Secret Code~ Final in Tokyo Dome	Released: December 15, 2010; Label: Rhythm Zone; Format: CD	1	JPN: 304,203
Tohoshinki Live Tour 2013 ~ Time ~	Release: October 23, 2013; Label: Avex Trax; Format: CD	1	JPN: 184,552
Tohoshinki Live Tour 2013 ~Time~ in Nissan Stadium	Release: December 18, 2013; Label: Avex Trax; Format: Digital EP	1	JPN: 133,069
"—" denotes releases that did not chart or were not released in that region.

== Soundtrack albums ==
List of soundtrack albums, with sales figures
Title	Album details	Sales
Vacation – Original Soundtrack	Released: July 28, 2006; Label: SM Entertainment; Formats: Cassette, CD	KOR: 23,659 (as of 2006)

== Remix albums ==
List of remix albums, with selected chart positions and sales figures
Title	Album details	Peak chart positions		Sales
Title	Album details	JPN	TW	Sales
Non-stop Mix Vol. 1	Released: October 24, 2007 (JPN); Label: Rhythm Zone; Format: CD	—	17	
Non-stop Mix Vol. 2	Released: March 24, 2010 (JPN); Label: Rhythm Zone; Format: CD	—	13	JPN: 50,860
Premium Classic Collection	Released: March 24, 2010 (JPN); Label: Rhythm Zone; Format: CD	—	—	JPN: 10,150
Two of Us	Released: October 5, 2016 (JPN); Label: Avex Trax; Formats: CD, digital download	2	—	JPN: 30,638
"—" denotes releases that did not chart or were not released in that region.

== Box sets ==
List of box sets
Title	Album details
Complete Set Limited Box	Released: June 30, 2010 (JPN limited release); Label: Rhythm Zone; Format: CD

== Other releases ==
Title	Album details
090325 4th Album "The Secret Code" Pre-release Special Mini Album + α	Released: February 28, 2009 (JPN); Label: Rhythm Zone; Formats: CD, DVD

== See also ==
- TVXQ singles discography
- TVXQ videography
- List of songs recorded by TVXQ
- List of awards and nominations received by TVXQ

== Notes ==
- A Prior to the establishment of the Gaon Music Chart in 2010, South Korea's music charts were supplied by the Music Industry Association of Korea (MIAK), which stopped compiling data in 2008. There are no reliably sourced cumulative chart records for albums sold in 2009.

Specific
