= Love Somebody =

Love Somebody may refer to:

- Love Somebody (album), a 2015 album by Reba McEntire
- Love Somebody (EP), a 2014 EP by Charmaine
- "Love Somebody" (Noiseworks song), 1987
- "Love Somebody" (Maroon 5 song), 2013
- "Love Somebody" (Morgan Wallen song), 2024
- "Love Somebody" (1947 song), a song by Doris Day released in 1947
- "Love Somebody" (Rick Springfield song), 1984
- "Love Somebody", a song by Robbie Williams, taken from his fifth album Escapology
- "Love Somebody", a song by Backstreet Boys from In a World Like This

== See also ==
- Love Someone (disambiguation)
- To Love Somebody (disambiguation)
- Somebody to Love (disambiguation)
