= To Love Somebody =

To Love Somebody may refer to:

== Music ==
- "To Love Somebody" (Bee Gees song), 1967 single by the Bee Gees
- "To Love Somebody" (Holly Humberstone song), 2026 single by Holly Humberstone
- To Love Somebody (album), Nina Simone's 1969 release
- Got to Love Somebody, 1980 song by Sister Sledge; on album Good Times: The Very Best of the Hits & the Remixes
- To Love Somebody – The Best of Michael Bolton, 2005 album listed at Michael Bolton discography

== Film ==
- To Love Somebody (2014 film), 2014 Mandarin-language romantic comedy-drama

== See also ==
- Somebody to Love Me (disambiguation)
- Somebody to Love (disambiguation)
- Someone to Love (disambiguation)
