= When You Love Someone =

When You Love Someone may refer to:

- "When You Love Someone" (Jake Owen song), from the 2016 album American Love
- "When You Love Someone" (James TW song), from the 2016 EP First Impressions
- "When You Love Someone" (Sammy Kershaw song), from the 1999 album Maybe Not Tonight
- "When You Love Someone", a song by Bryan Adams, originally released on the 1997 album Unplugged

== See also ==
- Love Someone (disambiguation)
- "When You Love Someone Like That", a song by Reba McEntire from the 2007 album Reba: Duets
- "If You Love Someone", a song by The Veronicas' from the same-named 2014 album
