= Love Someone =

Love Someone may refer to:

- "Love Someone" (Brett Eldredge song), 2018
- "Love Someone" (Jason Mraz song), 2014
- "Love Someone" (Lukas Graham song), 2018
- "Love Someone", a song by Miley Cyrus from Younger Now, 2017
- Love Someone, a 2021 album by Canadian country music singer Johnny Reid

== See also ==
- "If You Love Someone", a 2014 song by the Veronicas
- "Love Someone Like Me", a 1987 song by Holly Dunn
- Love Somebody (disambiguation)
- Someone to Love (disambiguation)
- When You Love Someone (disambiguation)
- "You Gotta Love Someone", a 1990 song by Elton John
