= Rise as God =

Studio album by TVXQ
- Released: July 20, 2015
- Recorded: 2013–15
- Genres: K-pop; R&B; dance
- Language: Korean
- Label: S.M.
- Producers: Hitchhiker; LDN Noise; Lee Soo-man (exec.); MonoTree; Yoo Young-jin

TVXQ chronology
With (2014)	Rise as God (2015)	Two of Us (2016)

Singles from Rise as God
- 1. "Rise as One" Released: July 20, 2015; 2. "Champagne" Released: July 20, 2015

Rise as God is a Korean studio album (unofficially the eighth release) by South Korean pop duo TVXQ. It was released on July 20, 2015, by S.M. Entertainment . Released as a special album, it is the duo's last musical release before taking their two-year hiatus to complete their mandatory military service.

Unlike TVXQ's previous albums, Rise as God received little promotion. Nonetheless, the album received positive reviews from music critics, and debuted at number one on the Gaon Album Chart, selling 150,000 copies by the end of 2015.

== Background and composition ==
In November 2013, S.M. Entertainment announced that TVXQ had recorded over twenty songs for their new album. The duo contemplated about releasing their new record in two parts. On January 6, 2014, TVXQ released their special tenth-anniversary album Tense, which included 12 songs. In late 2014, rumors began circulating among fansites that TVXQ were planning to release a special mini-album in the summer of 2015, but those rumors were never materialized.

In April 2015, S.M. confirmed that U-Know Yunho would be enlisting in the Republic of Korea Armed Forces as part of the mandatory military service imposed on all South Korean men aged 18 to 35. In July, S.M. announced that Max Changmin was accepted into a special unit for conscripted policemen, and will be enlisting at the end of the year. Due to their mandatory draft, TVXQ announced that they would be on hiatus for the next two years. At the Tistory: Special Live Tour encore shows held on June 13 and 14, the duo said they have recorded some new material and would release it sometime during their hiatus.

Rise as God was announced on July 15, one week before its release date. According to S.M.'s press release, the title of the album is inspired by TVXQ's Hanja name Dong Bang Shin Ki (Hanja: 東方神起), which roughly translates to "rising gods of the east." Its two lead singles were announced to be "Rise as One", an EDM song sung by Changmin; and "Champagne", a pop dance track performed by Yunho. "Champagne" was first revealed at the Tistory encore concerts that were held a month earlier, when Yunho performed "Champagne" during his solo segment. While "Rise as One" was described as a song that represented Yunho and Changmin's journey through the years, "Champagne" was described as a fun party song. Yunho chose "Champagne" as his last single before enlistment because he wanted to leave the fans with a happy note. Yunho was drafted as an active duty soldier on July 21, the day after the album's release.

== Release and performance ==
Due to the duo's unavailability, Rise as God received little promotion. Introducing it as a parting gift for fans, S.M. only used social media to promote the album. TVXQ's fans were alerted of the album's release on July 15, one week before its official release date. Online pre-orders were made available, and it topped South Korea's Synarra Record charts and Japan's Tower Records charts soon after pre-orders were announced. A sneak peek of the album's digital cover was released to Korean media agencies on July 15, followed by two black-and-white teaser photos featuring Yunho and Changmin the next day. The ten track set was revealed on July 16.

On the midnight of July 17, S.M.'s official YouTube channel released a teaser video of the album, which featured snippets of the singles' separate music videos. Individual teaser videos for "Rise as One" and "Champagne" were unveiled on July 18 and 19 respectively. The two music videos premiered in full on the evening of July 20, the day of the album's release. The physical copy of Rise as God was released by traditional mediums on July 21. It was made available in two versions–black or white–with two different photobooks that featured solo shots of the duo.

== Commercial performance ==
On the first day of sales in South Korea, Hanteo Album Charts, which tracks real-time sales from affiliated retailers, reported that Rise as God was behind Super Junior's Devil on the first day of release. It jumped to number one on the second day but dropped back to number two on the third day. It finished the week at number two and sold approximately 30,000 physical copies, making it TVXQ's slowest opening-week sales since their debut with Tri-Angle in 2004.

On South Korea's weekly Gaon Album Chart, Rise as God debuted at number one, making it TVXQ's fourth consecutive number one since the chart's establishment in 2010. According to Gaon, 148,155 copies were shipped in the first month, outperforming Super Junior by 12,000 units.

In Japan, Rise as God entered the weekly Oricon Albums Chart at number six, with sales of 18,093 imported copies.

The album's two singles, "Champagne" and "Rise as One", failed to chart on South Korea's weekly digital charts. However, "Champagne" and "Rise as One" topped China's Baidu King weekly charts upon its first week, taking first and second place, respectively. Other songs from the album, including Yunho's "Komplikated", Changmin's "Apology," and the duet "Top of the World," peaked in the top ten.

== Track listing ==
Rise as God track listing
No.	Title	Lyrics	Music	Arrangement	Length
1.	"Vertigo" (현기증)	Misfit; 100% Seojung	Max Schneider; Dillon Pace; Jenna Andrew	Outer Earth Productions	3:45
2.	"Champagne" (샴페인; sung by U-Know)	Baek Geum-min; Lee Soo-jung; Mafly	August Rigo; Peter Tambakis; Ryan S. Jhun	Rigo; Tambakis; Jhun	3:43
3.	"Rise as One" (sung by Max)	Kenzie	Toby Gad; Arty; Josh Cumbee; Afsheen; Jessica Sanchez; Nolan Sipe	Gad; Cumbee; Afsheen; Flash Finger; KooKing; Vack	3:01
4.	"Everyday It Rains" (비를 타고…)	Hwang Hyun (Monotree)	Jamie Jones; Oskar Cartaya	Jones; Cartaya	4:41
5.	"Smile" (웨딩드레스)	Jo Yoon-kyung	Teddy Riley; Lee Hyun-seung; DOM; Daniel "Obi" Klein; J.Sol	Riley; Lee H.; DOM; Klein; J.Sol	3:46
6.	"Top of the World" (너는 내꺼)	Yoo Young-jin; Ryan Yoo	Yoo Y.	Yoo Y.	3:57
7.	"Apology" (sung by Max)	Kim Min-ji	Harvey Mason Jr.; Dewain Whitmore Jr.; Deez	Mason; Whitmore; Deez	3:55
8.	"Komplikated" (sung by U-Know)	Hwang Ji-won; Shin Jin-hye	Tay Jasper; LDN Noise	Jasper; LDN Noise	2:49
9.	"Dominus"	Lee Joo-hyung (MonoTree); Kim Yoo-seok (MonoTree)	Lee J.; Kim Y.	Lee J.; Kim Y.	3:11
10.	"Lucky Star"	Kim Bu-min	Hitchhiker	Hitchhiker	3:53
Total length:					36:41

== Credits and personnel ==
Credits adapted from the liner notes of Rise as God.

- Lee Soo-man – producer
- Lee Sung-soo, Yoo Jeh-ni, Heo Min-young – A&R Director & Coordination
- TVXQ (U-Know Yunho, Max Changmin) – vocals, background vocals
- Lee Jae-myung – vocal director (tracks 1, 5)
- Jung Eun-kyung – recording, vocal editing (tracks 1–3, 5, 7, 10)
- Nam Kung-jin – mixing (track 1)
- Kim Tae-woo – background vocals (track 1)
- MonoTree – vocal directors, protocols, digital editing, vocal editing (tracks 2–4, 8–9)
- Kye Bum-joo – background vocals (tracks 2, 4)
- Byun Jang-mun – background vocals (track 2)
- Peter Tambakis – background vocals (track 2)
- August Rigo – background vocals (track 2)
- Goo Jong-pil of BeatBurger – mixing, bass (track 3)
- Jessica Sanchez – background vocals (track 3)
- Kim Chul-soon – recording, mixing (tracks 4, 7)
- Jamie Jones – background vocals (track 4)
- Lee Sung-ho – recording (track 5)
- Jung Wi-suk – mixing (tracks 5, 10)
- Kang Tae-woo – background vocals (track 5)
- Yoo Young-jin – directing, recording, mixing, background vocals (track 6)
- Jun Seung-woo – vocal director, background vocals (track 7)
- Tay Jasper – background vocals (track 8)
- Kim Su-chang – background vocals (track 9)
- Hitchhiker – directing, guitar, keyboard, bass (track 10
- Beat Burger (Jae Sim, Greg Hwang) – choreography director
- Mihawk Back – choreographer
- Kim Ye-min – art director
- Jung Go-woon – design
- Lee Yeong-hak – photographer
- Jung Bo-yun, Lee Ji-hye, Song Myung-hee, Lee Ji-eun, Oh Hyun-jung – jacket styling
- Lee Ji – Jacket Hair Styling
- Choi Hee-seon – Jacket Make-up
- Kim Jong-gun – "Rise as One" MV director
- Hong Wong-ki – "Champagne" MV director

== Charts ==
=== Weekly charts ===
Chart (2015)	Peak position
South Korean Gaon Weekly Album Chart	1
South Korean Gaon Monthly Album Chart	1
South Korean Gaon Year-End Album Chart	10
Japanese Oricon Weekly Album Chart	6

=== Sales ===
Region	Chart	Sales/shipments
South Korea	Gaon Album Chart	151,625
Japan	Oricon Albums Chart	34,396

== Release history ==
Region	Date	Format(s)	Label
Worldwide	July 20, 2015	Digital download	S.M. Entertainment
South Korea	July 20, 2015	Digital download; CD	S.M. Entertainment

== See also ==
- TVXQ albums discography
