= Somebody to Love =

Somebody to Love may refer to:

== Music ==
- "Somebody to Love" (Jefferson Airplane song), 1967
- "Somebody to Love" (Justin Bieber song), 2010
- "Somebody to Love" (OneRepublic song), 2019
- "Somebody to Love" (Suzy Bogguss song), 1998
- "Somebody to Love" (Leighton Meester song), 2009
- "Somebody to Love" (Queen song), 1976
- "Somebody to Love", by Big Bang from the album Tonight, 2011
- "Somebody to Love", by Bobby Darin from the album For Teenagers Only, 1960
- "Somebody to Love", by Nelly Furtado from the album Loose, 2006
- "Somebody to Love", a song from the rock musical film Hair
- "Somebody to Love", by Chris Isaak from the album Always Got Tonight, 2006
- "Somebody to Love", by TVXQ from the album Heart, Mind and Soul, 2006
- "Somebody to Love", by Kylie Minogue from the deluxe edition of her album Tension, 2023
- "Solo Quiero (Somebody to Love)", a song by Leona Lewis, Cali y El Dandee and Juan Magán, 2019

== Television and film ==
- Somebody to Love (1994 film), a 1994 American film starring Rosie Perez
- Somebody to Love (2014 film), a Filipino film
- "Somebody to Love" (30 Rock), an episode of 30 Rock
- "Somebody to Love" (That '70s Show), an episode of That '70s Show
- Somebody to Love (Fargo), an episode of the American television series Fargo

== See also ==
- Somebody to Love Me (disambiguation)
- "Everybody Needs Somebody to Love", a 1964 song by Solomon Burke
- Someone to Love (disambiguation)
- To Love Somebody (disambiguation)
- "Nobody to Love", a 2014 song by Sigma
- "Somebody to Love", a storyline in the science fiction comedy webtoon series Live with Yourself!
