= New Chapter =

American dietary supplement manufacturer

New Chapter, Inc.
- Founded: 1982
- Founder: Paul Schulick; Barbi Schulick
- Headquarters: Brattleboro, Vermont
- Parent: Procter & Gamble

New Chapter, Inc. is the American manufacturer of the New Chapter brand of vitamins and other organic dietary supplements. Based in Brattleboro, Vermont, the company is a Public Benefit Corporation (PBC) subsidiary of Procter & Gamble. The company's products include herbal supplements, probiotics, superfood greens and mushrooms.

== Corporate organization ==
New Chapter was acquired by Procter & Gamble in 2012. As a PBC, its stated public benefit is "sustainably promoting public health by nourishing body and soul through its products, including, but not limited to, whole foods and herbal supplements, in an environmentally conscious and socially responsible way."

The company is a certified B Corporation. According to B Lab, in 2014, New Chapter became the first major vitamin and supplement company to become a certified B Corp. P&G is one of several publicly held multinational corporations to have become involved in the "B Corp movement" through a subsidiary.

== Products ==
Products under the New Chapter brand include organic dietary supplements. According to Supermarket News, in 2021, New Chapter was one of the top selling brands in organic multivitamins and organic turmeric.

=== Patents ===
In 2019, the USPTO granted Procter & Gamble a patent for a food supplement containing biotin, Reishi mushrooms and a type of algae called Haematococcus pluvialis. The company claims that the supplements supports hair, skin, and nails.

== History ==
The company was founded in 1982 by Paul and Barbi Schulick, who started the business by making herbal extracts in their garage, which they sold in a health food store they operated in Lexington, Massachusetts. Although the herbal extracts did not sell well on their own, the couple said they noticed that there was consistent demand for vitamin supplements; packaging the two together, they called the revamped business their "New Chapter". The company sourced some ingredients from an organic estate in Costa Rica. In 1986, the Schulicks moved to Brattleboro, Vermont, where they opened a new shop called The Natural Apothecary. In 2003, Zyflamend, the New Chapter product for "inflammation response", was mentioned by celebrity doctor Andrew Weil on Larry King Live; according to Paul Schulick, this led to $1 million in sales within little more than a week.

In 2005, New Chapter received investment from 6Pacific Group, a corporate finance firm. In 2007, the company announced a deal to expand into Asia by partnering with Daesang, a South Korean food company; by then, New Chapter was recognized by The Brattleboro Reformer as the world's largest organic vitamin company. In 2009, New Chapter told The New York Times that it had seen an uptick in sales of vitamins and supplements during the winter cold season in North America, despite the economic recession. By 2012, New Chapter was selling over 80 different products.

=== Acquisition by P&G ===
The acquisition by Procter & Gamble in March 2012 initially met with skepticism, as well as disappointment from New Chapter customers. Some P&G employees questioned the effectiveness of nutritional and herbal supplements, while proponents of New Chapter were uneasy with P&G's approach to sustainability and transparency. Natural product retailers and buyers were apprehensive that acquisitions by large conglomerates could lead to lower product integrity. One industry insider predicted that the acquisition would result in natural product retailers "bottom-shelving" New Chapter products in anticipation of its move into mass market distribution, as part of P&G.

Six months later, long-time employees and suppliers of New Chapter said they were generally positive about P&G's investments in quality, technology, and resources for the company, as well as its willingness to support California's Proposition 37, while a spokesperson for P&G reiterated the parent company's commitment to allowing New Chapter to run autonomously. One year after the acquisition, Paul Schulick confirmed to Nutritional Outlook that P&G had invested additional personnel for New Chapter in quality control and innovation. P&G had also enabled New Chapter to run a marketing campaign in Manhattan, including advertising in New York City subway stations. As of March 2013, however, the company had not yet shifted focus to mass-market retailers, focusing instead on its existing distribution channels such as health food stores and other "natural product" retailers. As of June 2013, the company had about 300 employees, and had not laid any off. In 2016, Barbi Schulick stated that P&G was "standing behind non-GMO and organic."

In July 2018, the Schulicks left New Chapter, citing the pressure to accelerate profits. The Wall Street Journal reported that New Chapter had fallen out of the top 10 selling brands of natural vitamins and supplements in the United States, according to market data firm SPINS LLC, and was no longer profitable as a business unit within P&G. At the time, the company was selling only 60 products and had about 225 employees. P&G had pulled some New Chapter products from the market until certain product claims could be verified by further research, causing New Chapter to lose shelf space and online market share on Amazon.com in the meantime. In the Wall Street Journal interview, Paul Schulick stated that he was frustrated with what he viewed as excessive bureaucracy and reporting requirements as part of P&G, as well as the parent company's prioritization of short-term profitability over development of new "breakthrough" products. Another article in WholeFoods Magazine pointed to the Schulicks' unhappiness with P&G's acquisition of Merck KGaA's Consumer Health Business, which had annual sales of nearly $1 billion in products such as Femibion pregnancy supplements and Seven Seas cod liver oil. Meanwhile, spokespeople for P&G responded that New Chapter sales were increasing, that morale was not low, and that the company had a responsibility to shareholders.

== Controversy ==
Critics of supplement manufacturers including New Chapter have criticized the fact that they represent themselves as "an alternative to big pharma", when in fact "giant pharmaceutical firms actually own the bulk of the industry." Lack of oversight by the Food and Drug Administration has also led to concern about the safety and effectiveness of vitamin, mineral, and herbal supplements.

=== Waldman v. New Chapter, Inc. ===
In 2010, Anna Waldman filed a putative class action lawsuit against New Chapter, Inc. in the U.S. District Court for the Eastern District of New York. The plaintiff's complaint alleged that New Chapter had engaged in deceptive business practices by listing the product weight of "Berry Green" in metric weight (grams), rather than in ounces. A further complaint was that the defendant had packaged Berry Green in a non-transparent box that was 6 5/8 inches tall, whereas the contents of the box included a jar that was only 5 5/8 inches tall, and only half full. The court dismissed the plaintiff's claims regarding the defendant's use of the metric system, but allowed the plaintiff to pursue her claims regarding deceptive business practices and false advertising, on the basis of "excessive slack-fill" in packaging, which was sufficiently "misleading" in that it could give a false impression that consumers were buying more than they were receiving.

== Philanthropy ==
In 2008, New Chapter executive Tom Newmark led a hiking trip in Costa Rica with executives and founders of several "green businesses" including Whole Foods Market, Pet Promise, Fresh & Wild, Seventh Generation, and Kopali Organics. The purpose of the trip was to help raise $10 million for rainforest preservation, and discuss the future of the "natural products" industry.
