= The Christmas Gift from TVXQ =

EP by TVXQ
- Released: December 6, 2004
- Recorded: 2004
- Studios: S.M. Studios (Seoul, South Korea)
- Genres: Christmas; carol; K-pop
- Languages: Korean; English
- Label: S.M.
- Producers: Kenzie; Lee Soo Man (exec.)

TVXQ chronology
Tri-Angle (2004)	The Christmas Gift from TVXQ (2004)	Rising Sun (2005)

Singles from The Christmas Gift from TVXQ
- 1. "Magic Castle" Released: December 6, 2004

The Christmas Gift from TVXQ (stylized as The Christmas Gift from 東方神起!) is the first Christmas EP by South Korean boy band TVXQ, released on December 6, 2004 by S.M. Entertainment. The EP features Korean and English cover versions of popular Christmas tunes. It also includes a remake of The Classic's 1994 Korean song "Mabeopui Seong (Magic Castle)" (Hangul: 마법의 성), which was promoted as the EP's lead single. For the EP, TVXQ worked closely with Kenzie, who produced the album's music and vocal arrangements.

The EP features acoustic arrangements, synthesized orchestras, and harmonizing vocals performed in a choir style. It also includes a cappella renditions of Christmas carols.

== Chart performance ==
The EP was released two months after TVXQ's debut album Tri-Angle, which was the eighth best-selling album in South Korea. According to the Music Industry Association of Korea (MIAK), The Christmas Gift from TVXQ sold 68,888 copies in December 2004. The EP entered the Gaon Albums Chart in 2010 and peaked at number six for the week of April 18–24, 2010. The EP has sold approximately 109,000 copies as of 2012.

=== Weekly charts ===
Chart (2010)	Peak position
South Korean Albums Chart (Gaon)	6

== Track listing ==
No.	Title	Length
1.	"Jesus, Joy Of Man's Desiring" (a cappella ver.)	1:02
2.	"The First Noel"	2:56
3.	"마법의 성" (Magic Castle)	4:08
4.	"기도문" (Prayer)	3:45
5.	"글로리아 높으신 이의 탄생" (Angels We Have Heard On High)	1:46
6.	"Santa Claus Is Coming To Town"	1:51
7.	"고요한밤 거룩한밤" (Silent Night, Holy Night)	2:52
8.	"마법의 성" (Magic Castle) (instrumental)	4:06

== "Magic Castle" ==
"Magic Castle"

Single by TVXQ

from the album The Christmas Gift from TVXQ
- Released: December 6, 2004
- Recorded: 2004
- Genre: Ballad
- Label: S.M.
- Songwriter: Kim Gwang-jin
- Producer: Gwang-jin

TVXQ singles chronology
"Tri-Angle" (2004)	"Magic Castle" (2004)	"Stay with Me Tonight" (2005)

Music video
- "Magic Castle (마법의 성)" on YouTube

"Magic Castle" (Hangul: 마법의 성; Mabeopui Seong), written by Kim Gwang-jin, is the title song of The Classic's debut album, Magic Castle (1994). The song has been covered by several Korean artists since its release, including Lee Seung-hwan, As One, and Seo Young-eun. TVXQ released their cover version of it on December 6, 2004, and it was used to promote their Christmas EP, The Christmas Gift from TVXQ.

TVXQ promoted "Magic Castle" simultaneously with "Tri-Angle" and "Believe", the lead singles from their debut album Tri-Angle. The band did their first performance of "Magic Castle" on December 4, 2004 at the 2004 Mnet KM Music Festival. Their last promotional appearance for the song was on January 15, 2005, at MBC's Music Camp.

The music video of TVXQ's "Magic Castle" features the first appearance of Yoona before she joined the girl group Girls' Generation. The video was filmed at Lotte World.

== Release history ==
Region	Date	Format(s)	Label
South Korea	December 6, 2004	Digital download	S.M. Entertainment
South Korea	December 7, 2004	CD	S.M. Entertainment

== See also ==
- TVXQ albums discography
