= Rising Sun (TVXQ album) =

Studio album by TVXQ
- Released: September 12, 2005
- Recorded: 2005
- Studio: SM Digital Recording Studio (Seoul)
- Genres: K-pop; pop; Hip-hop; R&B
- Length: 48:50
- Language: Korean
- Label: SM
- Producer: Lee Soo-man

TVXQ chronology
The Christmas Gift from TVXQ (2004)	Rising Sun (2005)	Heart, Mind and Soul (2006)

Hong Kong edition cover

Singles from Rising Sun
- 1. "Rising Sun" Released: September 12, 2005; 2. "Tonight" Released: September 12, 2005

Rising Sun is the second Korean-language studio album by South Korean boy group TVXQ, released on through SM Entertainment on September 12, 2005. Musicians including Yoo Young-jin, Kenzie, Hwang Sung Je and All-4-One's Jamie Jones took part in the album's songwriting and production. Musically, Rising Sun is primarily a pop album, but also includes tracks that utilize styles such as hip-hop, rock, teen pop, and ballads.

A commercial success, Rising Sun debuted at number one on the South Korean monthly record chart compiled by the Music Industry Association of Korea (MIAK) and was the fourth best-selling album during 2005, selling over 222,000 copies. It recorded sales of over 290,000 copies by May 2008 according to MIAK. The record yielded the singles "Rising Sun" and "Tonight", with accompanying music videos produced for both tracks. "Rising Sun" won the Most Popular Music Video (daesang) at the 2005 Mnet KM Music Video Festival.

== Background and release ==
A repackage of the album, titled Rising Sun Repackage Story Book: Five Secret Story, was made available on November 28, 2005. The release came with a VCD containing collector's footage of TVXQ in Japan including their appearance in Tokyo in May 2005, a 160-page photo album featuring images taken in China, Korea, Bora Bora, and the United States, as well as behind the scenes footage of the "Rising Sun" music video.

On October 24, 2007, the Japanese edition of Rising Sun was released, coinciding with the Japanese edition of their subsequent studio album "O"-Jung.Ban.Hap. and remix album TVXQ Nonstop-Mix Vol. 1. Elsewhere, Rising Sun was also released in Asian territories such as Taiwan, Hong Kong, and Thailand.

== Singles ==
"Rising Sun" was announced as the album's title track on September 2, 2005. Its lyrics revolve around the gradual loss of purity and corruption of innocence that exists within humans, where it expresses human regret by comparing them to a disappearing sunset while containing the meaning of rediscovering the purity in human beings. Its music video received the Most Popular Music Video (daesang) prize at the 2005 Mnet KM Music Video Festival.

The Japanese version was included in the TVXQ's first Japanese album Heart, Mind and Soul, which was released in Japan in March 2006. On April 19, 2006, a physical edition of the song was released in Japan as a double A-side single titled "Rising Sun / Heart, Mind and Soul". In 2009, "Rising Sun" was featured in the Hollywood film Fast & Furious during Paul Walker's opening scene.

== Commercial performance ==
Rising Sun was met with commercial success in South Korea upon its release. It was ranked the 4th best-selling album in the country in 2005 and the 31st best-selling in 2006 by the Recording Industry Association of Korea (RIAK). The year 2007 is said to be K-pop's biggest slump in sales in South Korea, with the highest selling album by SG Wannabe recording 190,998 copies sold.

TVXQ's Rising Sun still managed to make it onto the top 100 on the yearly chart, despite its release in 2005. It was the highest selling "old" album in 2007, appearing at number 67 on the year-end chart compiled by the Music Industry Association of Korea (MIAK). The album sold over 290,000 copies in the country by May 2008.

== Critical reception ==
Sina Entertainment named it one of the Top 10 Asian Albums of 2005, alongside releases such as BoA's Best of Soul, Ayumi Hamasaki's My Story, Koda Kumi's Best: First Things, and Mika Nakashima's Music.

=== Accolades ===
Awards and nominations
Ceremony	Year	Category	Nominee	Result	Ref.
Mnet KM Music Festival	2005	Most Popular Music Video (Daesang)	"Rising Sun"	Won	
Mnet KM Music Festival	2005	Mnet Plus Mobile Popularity Award	"Rising Sun"	Won	
Mnet KM Music Festival	2005	Best Dance Performance	"Rising Sun"	Nominated	
SBS Gayo Daejeon	2005	Grand Prize (Daesang)	Rising Sun	Nominated	
SBS Gayo Daejeon	2005	Main Prize (Bonsang)	Rising Sun	Won	
Thailand [V] Awards	2006	Popular Music Video	"Rising Sun"	Won	

Music program awards for "Rising Sun"
Program	Date	Ref.
Inkigayo	October 9, 2005	
Inkigayo	October 16, 2005	
Inkigayo	October 23, 2005	
M Countdown	October 13, 2005	

== Track listing ==
Rising Sun – Standard edition
No.	Title	Lyrics	Music	Arrangement	Length
1.	"Tonight"	Yoo Young-jin	Yoo Han-jin	Yoo Han-jin	4:40
2.	"Beautiful Life"	Young-hu Kim	Jamie Jones (The Heavyweights); Jack Kugell (The Heavyweights); Jason Pennock (The Heavyweights); Sarah Nagourney	The Heavyweights	3:37
3.	"Rising Sun" (순수; Sunsu; 'Pure')	Yoo Young-jin	Yoo Young-jin	Yoo Young-jin	4:42
4.	"Unforgettable" (바보; Babo; 'Fool')	Kwon Yoon-jung	Hwang Seong-je (BJJ Music)	Hwang Seong-je (BJJ Music)	4:16
5.	"Love Is Never Gone" (내가 허락할 테니; Naega heorakhal teni; 'I Will Allow')	Jin Young-jin	Jack Kugell (The Heavyweights)	The Heavyweights	4:44
6.	"Love After Love"	Lee Sang-in; U-Know Yunho; Micky Yoochun	Lee Sang-in	Lee Sang-in	3:47
7.	"Dangerous Mind"	Yoo Young-jin	Yoo Young-jin	Yoo Young-jin	3:56
8.	"One"	Kenzie	Kenzie	Kenzie	4:03
9.	"Love Is..."	Minuki	Minuki	Kim Sung-hoon	3:41
10.	"Free Your Mind" (featuring The TRAX)	Young-hu Kim (Xperimental Music)	Young-hu Kim (Xperimental Music); William Pyon (Xperimental Music)	Ahn Ik-soo	4:06
11.	"Love Is All I Need" (작은 고백; Jageun gobaek; 'Little Confession')	Steven Lee	Jojo Bee (Xperimental Music)	Xperimental Music	4:01
12.	"Always There..." (약속했던 그때에; Yaksokhaetdeon geuttaee; 'When I Promised')	Lee Yoon-jae	Lee Yoon-jae	Lee Yoon-jae	3:17
Total length:					48:50

Rising Sun – Japanese edition
No.	Title	Length
13.	"Beautiful Life" (Japanese version)

Rising Sun – CD + VCD
No.	Title	Length
13.	"Unforgettable" (바보) (中文版)
14.	"Rising Sun" (순수) (中文版)

Japanese edition – CD + VCD
No.	Title	Length
1.	"Always There..." (music video)
2.	"Rising Sun" (music video)
3.	"Rising Sun" (music video – behind the scenes) (Japanese subtitles)

Hong Kong edition – CD + VCD
No.	Title	Length
1.	"Rising Sun" (music video)
2.	"Rising Sun" (music video – behind the scenes) (Chinese subtitles)

Thailand edition – CD + VCD
No.	Title	Length
1.	"Always There..." (music video)
2.	"Rising Sun" (music video)
3.	"Rising Sun" (music video – behind the scenes)

Taiwan edition – CD + VCD
No.	Title	Length
1.	"Always There..." (music video)

== Charts ==
=== Weekly charts ===
Chart (2010)	Peak position
South Korean Albums (Gaon)	34

=== Monthly charts ===
Chart (2005)	Peak position
South Korean Albums (MIAK)	1

=== Year-end charts ===
Chart (2005)	Position
South Korean Albums (RIAK)	4

Chart (2006)	Position
South Korean Albums (RIAK)	31

Chart (2007)	Position
South Korean Albums (MIAK)	67

== Sales ==
Sales figures for Rising Sun
Region	Certification	Certified units/sales
South Korea	—	291,000

== Release history ==
Release history and formats for Rising Sun
Country	Date	Format(s)	Label
South Korea	September 12, 2005	CD; cassette; digital download	SM Entertainment
Taiwan	October 10, 2005	CD + video CD	Avex Taiwan
Hong Kong	December 8, 2005	CD + video CD	Avex Marketing
Thailand	July 15, 2007	CD + video CD	SM Entertainment
Japan	October 24, 2007	CD + video CD	Avex Inc.; Rhythm Zone
