= Somebody to Love Me =

Somebody to Love Me may refer to:

- "Somebody to Love Me" (The Jets song), 1990
- "Somebody to Love Me" (Mark Ronson & The Business Intl. song), 2010
- "Somebody to Love Me", a song by Honeyz from Wonder No. 8
- "Somebody to Love Me", a song by Kellie Pickler from Kellie Pickler
- "Somebody to Love Me", a song by Ronny & the Daytonas

== See also ==
- Somebody to Love (disambiguation)
- Someone to Love (disambiguation)
- "Someone to Love Me (Naked)", a song by Mary J. Blige
- "Someone to Love Me", a song by Diddy – Dirty Money from Last Train to Paris
