= Someone to Love =

Someone to Love may refer to:

== Songs ==
- "Someone to Love" (Fountains of Wayne song)
- "Someone to Love" (Jon B. song)
- "Someone to Love" (Sean Maguire song), 1994
- Somebody to Love (Jefferson Airplane song), originally titled "Someone to Love"
- "Someone to Love", by The Grass Roots from Move Along
- "Someone to Love", by Minipop from A New Hope
- "Someone to Love", by Moby from Animal Rights

== Other uses ==
- Someone to Love (1987 film), a 1987 film directed by Henry Jaglom
- Someone to Love (1928 film), a 1928 American comedy silent film
- Your Song: Someone to Love, a story arc during Season 10 of the Filipino TV series Your Song

== See also ==
- Love Someone (disambiguation)
- "Someone to Love Me (Naked)", a 2011 song by Mary J. Blige
- "Someone to Love Me", a song by Diddy – Dirty Money from Last Train to Paris
- Someone to Love You, a 2002 album by Ruff Endz
- Somebody to Love (disambiguation)
- Somebody to Love Me (disambiguation)
