= Hug (TVXQ song) =

2004 debut single by TVXQ

Single by TVXQ

from the album Tri-Angle
- Language: Korean; Japanese; English; Mandarin
- B-side: "My Little Princess"
- Released: January 14, 2004
- Recorded: 2003
- Studio: SM Yellow Tail (Seoul)
- Genre: K-pop
- Label: SM; Rhythm Zone
- Composer: Park Chang-hyun
- Lyricists: Yoon Jung; Park Chang-hyun
- Producer: Park Chang-hyun

TVXQ singles chronology
"Hug" (2004)	"The Way U Are" (2004)

Music video
- "Hug" on YouTube

"Hug" (Korean: 포옹; RR: Poong) is the debut single by South Korean pop group TVXQ. Written by Yoon Jung and Park Chang-hyun and produced by Park Chang-hyun, "Hug" was first performed at a joint showcase featuring label mate BoA and American singer Britney Spears on December 26, 2003, TVXQ's official debut day. The song was later released as a CD maxi single on January 14, 2004, in South Korea. Its accompanying music video was filmed in December 2003 at the Ilsan Art House. The follow-up promotional song, "My Little Princess", was written by Hwang Sung-jae.

Under the name Tohoshinki, the group released an English version of "Hug" as a CD and DVD single in Japan on November 25, 2004. The Japanese language version of "Hug" was featured in the group's debut Japanese album Heart, Mind and Soul (2006). The Mandarin-language counterpart of "Hug" was released in May 2007.

== Commercial performance ==
"Hug" was a sleeper hit in South Korea. It debuted at number thirty seven on the MIAK chart, (Note: Prior to the establishment of the Gaon, South Korea's music charts were supplied by the Music Industry of Korea (MIAK), which only published monthly and yearly rankings.) selling only 4,630 copies in the first month of release. Sales picked up the following month, and on March 28, 2004, TVXQ won their first music show award with "Hug" on The Music Trend. According to the MIAK, "Hug" peaked at number four on the months of April and May, selling a total of 56,543 copies in those months. "Hug" stayed charted for ten consecutive months, and by the end of the year, "Hug" sold over 169,000 copies. It was South Korea's fourteenth best-selling record of 2004. "Hug" sold 242,890 copies as of 2014. In Japan, "Hug" sold 4,710 copies.

== Accolades ==
In 2021, the song was included in Melon and Seoul Shinmun's critics ranking of Top 100 K-pop Songs of All Time at number 98.

Awards and nominations
Year	Organization	Category	Result	Ref.
2004	Mnet KM Music Video Festival	Best New Group Video	Won	
2004	Mnet KM Music Video Festival	Best Dance Video	Nominated	

Music program awards
Program	Date
Inkigayo	March 28, 2004
Inkigayo	April 4, 2004
Inkigayo	April 11, 2004
Music Camp	April 3, 2004
Music Camp	April 10, 2004
Music Camp	April 17, 2004

== Formats and track listings ==
- Korean single
1. "Hug"
2. "My Little Princess" (있잖아요...)
3. "Oh Holy Night" (featuring BoA)
4. "My Little Princess" (acappella version)
5. "Hug" (instrumental)
6. "Hug" (TV mix version)
- Japanese single

Disc 1 (CD)

1. "Hug" (international version)
2. "Hug" (international version – radio edit)
3. "Hug" (international version – instrumental)

Disc 2 (DVD)

1. "Hug" (international version; PV)
2. "Hug" (original version; PV)
3. "The Way U Are" (PV)

== Credits and personnel ==
Credits adapted from the single's liner notes.

Studio

- SM Yellow Tail Studio – recording
- SM Blue Cup Studio – mixing
- Sonic Korea – mastering

Personnel

- SM Entertainment – executive producer
- Lee Soo-man – producer
- Kim Young-min – executive supervisor
- TVXQ – vocals, background vocals
- Yoon Jung – lyrics
- Park Chang-hyun – producer, lyrics, composition, arrangement, recording
- Yeom Chul-hee – arrangement
- Kim Hyung-soo – background vocals
- Hong Jun-ho – guitar
- Yeo Doo-hyeon – recording, mixing
- Lee Seong-ho – recording
- Jeon Hoon – mastering

== Charts ==
=== Weekly charts ===
Chart (2004, 2014)	Peak position
Japan Singles (Oricon)	77
South Korean Albums (Gaon)	12

=== Monthly charts ===
Chart (2004)	Peak position
South Korean Albums (MIAK)	4

=== Year-end charts ===
Chart (2004)	Position
South Korean Albums (MIAK)	14

== Riize version ==
"Hug"

Single by Riize

from the album 2025 SM Town: The Culture, the Future
- Released: January 8, 2025
- Recorded: 2024
- Studio: SM Yellow Tail (Seoul)
- Length: 3:54
- Label: SM
- Songwriters: Yoon Jung; Park Chang-hyun
- Producer: Park Moon-chi

Riize singles chronology
"Combo" (2024)	"Hug" (2025)	"Fly Up" (2025)

Stage video
- "Hug" on YouTube

As part of SM Entertainment's 30th anniversary celebrations, a cover version of "Hug" was released by boy band Riize. The song was released on January 8, 2025, as the first single from the company's 2025 SM Town: The Culture, the Future album, which contains cover songs by various SM artists.

"Hug" (Riize version)
A 23-second audio sample of Riize's "Hug".

The song begins with an a capella introduction and transitions into a 2000s-influenced instrumental.

The band promoted the release with a performance video which was released simultaneously with the song, as well as a performance on Mnet's M Countdown on January 16. The song was also performed at both nights of SM's 30th anniversary concerts at Gocheok Sky Dome on January 11 and 12.

=== Credits and personnel ===
Credits adapted from the album's liner notes.

Studio

- SM Yellow Tail Studio – recording
- SM Aube Studio – recording
- SM LVYIN Studio – digital editing, engineered for mix
- SM Concert Hall Studio – mixing
- 821 Sound – mastering

Personnel

- SM Entertainment – executive producer
- Park Jun-young – creative executive
- Lee Sung-soo – A&R executive
- Tak Young-jun – IP executive, executive supervisor
- Jang Cheol-hyuk – executive supervisor
- Riize – vocals, background vocals
- Yoon Jung – lyrics
- Park Chang-hyun – lyrics, composition
- Park Moon-chi – producer, arrangement, vocal directing, piano
- Eldon – background vocals
- Park Han-jin – bass
- Koo Young-jun – guitar
- Noh Min-ji – recording
- Kim Hyo-joon – recording
- Lee Ji-hong – digital editing, engineered for mix
- Nam Koong-jin – mixing
- Kwon Nam-woo – mastering

=== Charts ===
==== Weekly charts ====
Weekly chart performance for "Hug" (Riize version)
Chart (2025)	Peak position
South Korea (Circle)	41

==== Monthly charts ====
Monthly chart performance for "Hug" (Riize version)
Chart (2025)	Position
South Korea (Circle)	68

=== Year-end charts ===
Year-end chart performance for "Hug" (Riize version)
Chart (2025)	Position
South Korea (Circle)	175
