= Five in the Black =

- CD only cover

Studio album by Tohoshinki
- Released: March 14, 2007
- Recorded: 2006–2007
- Studio: SM Blue Ocean (Seoul)
- Genre: J-pop; R&B; dance; electronic
- Length: 1:11:21
- Language: Japanese
- Label: Rhythm Zone

Tohoshinki chronology
"O"-Jung.Ban.Hap. (2006)	Five in the Black (2007)	T (2008)

Singles from Five in the Black
- 1. "Begin" Released: June 21, 2006; 2. "Sky" Released: August 16, 2006; 3. "Miss You/"O" Sei.Han.Gō." Released: November 8, 2006; 4. "Step by Step" Released: January 24, 2007; 5. "Choosey Lover" Released: March 7, 2007

Five in the Black is the second Japanese studio album (fifth overall) by South Korean pop group Tohoshinki, released on March 14, 2007, by Rhythm Zone.

== Track listing ==
Five in the Black track list
No.	Title	Lyrics	Music	Arrangement	Length
1.	"Zion"	H.U.B	Iain James; Christopher Lee-Joe; Curtis Richardson; Rob Davis	Tommy Henriksen	3:02
2.	"Sky"	H.U.B	H-Wonder	H-Wonder	5:30
3.	"Begin"	Matsuo Kiyoshi	Jin Nakamura	Jin Nakamura	5:34
4.	"Choosey Lover"	Yoko Hiji	Ryuichiro Yamaki	Ryuichiro Yamaki	4:34
5.	"Dead End"	H.U.B	Paul Drew (DWB Music); Greig Watts (DWB Music); Pete Barringer (DWB Music)	DWB Music	3:17
6.	"High Time"	Jam	Masataka Kitaura	Masataka Kitaura	4:02
7.	"Proud"	Ryoji Sonoda	Jin Nakamura	Jin Nakamura	5:10
8.	"Yakusoku (約束, Promise)"	H.U.B	Kentaro Fukushi	Kotaro Egami	4:49
9.	"Miss You"	H.U.B	Daisuke Suzuki	H-Wonder	4:42
10.	""O"-正.反.合. ("O"-Sei.Han.Gō., "O"-Thesis.Antithesis.Synthesis.)" (Japanese version)	Yoo Young-jin; H.U.B	Yoo Young-jin	Yoo Young-jin	4:17
11.	"I'll Be There" (Japanese version)	Hwang Seong-je (BJJ Music); Janie Yoo; H.U.B	Hwang Seong-je	Hwang Seong-je	4:42
12.	"Step by Step"	H.U.B	Hara Kazuhiro	Hara Kazuhiro	4:29
13.	"Hello Again"	H.U.B	Daisuke Suzuki	H-Wonder	5:00
14.	"Begin" (Acappella version)	Matsuo Kiyoshi	Jin Nakamura	Hideki Ninomiya	2:41
15.	"Miss You (Ballad version)"	H.U.B	Daisuke Suzuki	H-Wonder	4:36
16.	"A Whole New World" (First Press Bonus Track)	Alan Menken	Tim Rice	Akira	4:56
Total length:					71:21

Notes

- CD+DVD version of the album does not include tracks 14–16 ("Begin (Acapella version)", "Miss You (Ballad version)", and "A Whole New World").

DVD
No.	Title	Length
1.	"Rising Sun MV"
2.	"Begin MV"
3.	"Sky MV"
4.	"Miss You MV"
5.	""O"-正.反.合 MV"
6.	"Step by Step MV"
7.	"Choosey Lover MV"
8.	"Offshoot Movie" (Only included in First Press Edition)

== Charts ==
=== Weekly charts ===
Chart (2007)	Peak position
Japanese Albums (Oricon)	10

=== Monthly charts ===
Chart (2007)	Peak position
South Korean Int'l Albums (MIAK)	1

== Sales and certifications ==
Region	Certification	Certified units/sales
Japan (RIAJ)	Gold	62,362
South Korea	—	25,750

=== Singles in Oricon charts ===
Date	Title	Peak position	Weeks
2006-06-21	"Begin"	15	5
2006-08-16	"Sky"	6	2
2006-11-08	"Miss You /"O"-正.反.合."	3	3
2007-01-24	"Step by Step"	7	4
2007-03-07	"Choosey Lover"	9	1
