= Tri-Angle =

Studio album by TVXQ
- Released: October 13, 2004
- Recorded: 2003–2004
- Studio: SM Booming System (Seoul); SM Digital Recording (Seoul); SM Yellow Tail (Seoul)
- Genre: K-pop; R&B; dance; rock; teen pop
- Length: 56:05
- Language: Korean
- Label: SM
- Producer: Lee Soo-man

TVXQ chronology
Tri-Angle (2004)	The Christmas Gift from TVXQ (2004)

Taiwanese edition cover

Singles from Tri-Angle
- 1. "Hug" Released: January 14, 2004; 2. "The Way U Are" Released: June 24, 2004; 3. "I Believe" Released: October 13, 2004; 4. "Tri-Angle" Released: October 13, 2004

Tri-Angle is the debut studio album by South Korean boy group TVXQ, released through SM Entertainment on October 13, 2004. Several singles were released as part of the album, including "Hug", "The Way U Are", "I Believe" and the title track "Tri-Angle" featuring BoA and The TRAX.

Commercially, the album peaked at number 1 on the monthly MIAK album chart for October 2004, selling over 166,000 copies. It was the 8th best-selling album during 2004 in South Korea, selling over 242,000 copies by the end of the year. In addition, the physical release of the singles "Hug" and "The Way U Are" collectively sold over 380,000 copies.

== Commercial performance ==
It sold 242,540 copies and became the eighth most successful album of the year in South Korea. The first single "Hug" debuted with 169,532 physical copies sold in 2004, peaking at number four on the national monthly chart. As of 2014, it sold 242,890 copies. In November 2004, the Japanese version of "Hug" was released in Japan by Rhythm Zone, ultimately selling 4,710 copies.

The second single, "The Way U Are" debuted at number two on the national chart and sold 214,069 copies with its physical release. By the end of the year, the single sold 300,226 copies. The album's last title single "Tri-Angle" uses a sample from the Symphony No. 40 in G minor by Mozart. The single also features the vocals of BoA and rock band the TRAX, however it was not released as a physical single. The album Tri-Angle sold approximately 309,000 copies as of 2011.

== Accolades ==
Awards and nominations
Year	Award	Category	Result	Ref.
2004	MBC Gayo Daejejeon	Top Ten Singers Award	Won	
2004	MBC Gayo Daejejeon	Best New Artist	Won	
2004	Mnet KM Music Video Festival	Best New Group Video (for "Hug")	Won	
2004	Mnet KM Music Video Festival	Best Dance Video (for "The Way U Are")	Nominated	
2004	SBS Gayo Daejeon	Main Prize (Bonsang)	Won	
2004	SBS Gayo Daejeon	Grand Prize (Daesang)	Nominated	

Music program awards
Song	Program	Date
"Hug"	Inkigayo	March 28, 2004
"Hug"	Inkigayo	April 4, 2004
"Hug"	Inkigayo	April 11, 2004
"Hug"	Music Camp	April 3, 2004
"Hug"	Music Camp	April 10, 2004
"Hug"	Music Camp	April 17, 2004
"The Way U Are"	M Countdown	August 5, 2004
"The Way U Are"	M Countdown	August 12, 2004
"The Way U Are"	M Countdown	August 19, 2004
"The Way U Are"	Inkigayo	September 5, 2004
"I Believe"	M Countdown	November 25, 2004
"I Believe"	M Countdown	December 9, 2004
"I Believe"	Inkigayo	December 5, 2004
"Tri-Angle"	Inkigayo	January 2, 2005

== Track listing ==
Tri-Angle – Standard edition
No.	Title	Lyrics	Music	Arrangement	Length
1.	"I Believe" (믿어요; Mideoyo)	Park Chang-hyun	Park Chang-hyun	Park Chang-hyun	4:51
2.	"Thanks To"	Kim Su-jeong	Lee Sang-in	Lee Sang-in	4:22
3.	"Tri-Angle" (Extended version) (featuring BoA and The TRAX)	Yoo Young-jin	Yoo Young-jin; Groovie.K	Yoo Young-jin	4:34
4.	"Will You Be My Girlfriend?" (내 여자친구가 되어줄래?; Nae yeojachinguga doeeojullae?)	Bae Hwa-young	Tommy La Verdi; Daniel Pandher; Erik Andre Rydningen	Ahn Ik-Soo	3:43
5.	"Whatever They Say" (Acappella version)	Young-hu Kim (Xperimental Music); Daniel Roman	William Pyon (Xperimental Music); Young-hu Kim (Xperimental Music)	Xperimental Music	3:48
6.	"Million Men"	Yoo Young-jin	Yoo Young-jin	Yoo Young-jin	3:29
7.	"Like Now" (지금처럼; Jigeumcheoreom)	Kenzie	Kenzie	Kenzie	4:21
8.	"I Never Let Go"	Lee Yoon-jae	Lee Yoon-jae	Lee Yoon-jae	4:18
9.	"Hey, Kid" (꼬마야; Kkomaya)	Yoon Jung	Jeff Franzel; Jon Rydningen; Ken Ingwersen; Marjorie Maye	Kenzie	3:39
10.	"You Always" (넌 언제나; Neon eonjena)	Jeong Kyung-ah	Park Jung-won	Hwang Seong-je (BJJ Music)	3:46
11.	"Hug"	Park Chang-hyun; Yoon Jung	Park Chang-hyun	Park Chang-hyun; Yeom Chul-hee	3:48
12.	"My Little Princess" (있잖아요...; Itjanayo...; 'You Know...')	Bae Hwa-young	Hwang Seong-je (BJJ Music)	Hwang Seong-je (BJJ Music)	3:51
13.	"The Way U Are"	Taehoon	Daniel Pandher; Robert Zuddas	Hwang Seong-je (BJJ Music)	3:28
14.	"Tri-Angle" (TVXQ version)	Yoo Young-jin	Yoo Young-jin; Groovie.K	Yoo Young-jin	4:05
Total length:					56:05

Tri-Angle – Japanese edition
No.	Title	Length
15.	"Hug" (international version)	4:13

Tri-Angle – Taiwanese edition (2CD deluxe version)
No.	Title	Length
1.	"我相信 中文版"
2.	"Tri-Angle 三角-魔力 中文版" (東方神起 & BoA & Trax 加長版)
3.	"My Little Princess" (想跟妳説）(中文版)
4.	"The Way U Are" (妳的樣子) (中文版)
5.	"Hug" (擁抱) (中文版)

Tri-Angle DVD – Taiwanese edition (2CD deluxe version)
No.	Title	Length
6.	"Hug" (music video)
7.	"My Little Princess" (acappella) (music video)
8.	"The Way U Are" (music video)
9.	"Tri-Angle" (music video)
10.	"믿어요" (Believe) (music video)

== Credits and personnel ==
Recording

- SM Yellow Tail Studio – recording
- SM Booming System – recording, mixing
- SM Digital Recording Studio – recording
- SM Blue Cup Studio – mixing
- Sonic Korea – mastering

Staff

- SM Entertainment – executive producer
- Lee Soo-man – executive producer
- Min Hee-jin – art direction, design
- Joon-young Park – art direction, design
- Eugenie – A&R direction and coordination
- Jeong Chang-hwan – A&R direction and coordination
- Seung-hee Lee – stylist
- Jeong Bo-yoon – stylist
- Cho Chae-young – publishing
- Jin Hyun-joo – publishing
- Park Sang-hoon – photography
- Kim Kyung-wook – executive supervisor

== Charts ==
=== Weekly charts ===
Chart (2004)	Peak position
Japanese Albums (Oricon)	93

Chart (2010)	Peak position
South Korean Albums (Gaon)	35

=== Monthly charts ===
Chart (2004)	Peak position
South Korean Albums (RIAK)	1

=== Year-end charts ===
Chart (2004)	Position
South Korean Albums (RIAK)	8

== Sales ==
Region	Certification	Certified units/sales
South Korea	—	305,343

== Release history ==
Country	Date	Version(s)	Format(s)	Label(s)
South Korea	October 13, 2004	Standard	CD; cassette; digital download	SM
Japan	November 25, 2004	Standard	CD, digital download	Avex Trax; SM
Thailand	December 5, 2005	Standard	CD+VCD	Avex Trax; SM; GMM Grammy
Hong Kong	July 14, 2006	Standard	CD	SM
Taiwan	May 31, 2007	Deluxe	CD	SM
Japan	July 15, 2007	Deluxe	CD	Avex Trax
