= Heart, Mind and Soul (TVXQ album) =

Studio album by Tohoshinki
- Released: March 22, 2006
- Recorded: 2005–2006
- Genres: J-pop; R&B; dance-pop
- Length: 57:40
- Language: Japanese
- Label: Rhythm Zone
- Producer: Max Matsuura

Tohoshinki chronology
| Rising Sun (2005) | Heart, Mind and Soul (2006) | "O"-Jung.Ban.Hap. (2006) |

Singles from Heart, Mind and Soul
- 1. "Stay with Me Tonight" Released: April 27, 2005; 2. "Somebody to Love" Released: July 13, 2005; 3. "My Destiny" Released: November 2, 2005; 4. "Asu wa Kuru Kara" Released: March 8, 2006; 5. "Rising Sun / Heart, Mind and Soul" Released: April 19, 2006

Professional ratings
Review scores
| Source | Rating |
|---|---|
| KoME | (favorable) |

Heart, Mind and Soul is the debut Japanese studio album (third overall) by South Korean pop group Tohoshinki, released on March 22, 2006, by Rhythm Zone. It was released in two physical versions: a CD only version, which includes bonus tracks; and a CD+DVD version, which includes a track list of PVs. The album debuted on the Oricon Albums Chart at number 22, selling 18,000 copies.

== Track listing ==
Heart, Mind and Soul track listing
| No. | Title | Lyrics | Music | Arrangement | Length |
|---|---|---|---|---|---|
| 1. | "Introlude" | | Yasuski Fukuyama | | 0:43 |
| 2. | "No Words Are Needed" (Kotoba wa Iranai (言葉はいらない)) | Matsuo Kiyoshi | Masaya Wada | Masaya Wada | 4:35 |
| 3. | "Tomorrow Will Surely Come" (Asu wa Kuru Kara (明日は来るから)) | Takeshi Senoo; Matsuo Kiyoshi | Takeshi Senoo | K-Muto | 5:12 |
| 4. | "Somebody to Love" | Yoshimitsu Sawamoto; Matsuo Kiyoshi | Kei Haneoka | Daisuke Imai (Digz, Inc.) | 4:52 |
| 5. | "My Destiny" | Matsuo Kiyoshi | Akihisa Matsuura | Maestro-T | 5:12 |
| 6. | "Hug" (Japanese version) | Kenn Kato; Park Chang-hyun; Yoon Jung | Park Chang Hyun | Hitoshi Harukawa | 4:07 |
| 7. | "Break Up the Shell" | Kenn Kato | H-Wonder | H-Wonder | 3:54 |
| 8. | "Stay with Me Tonight" | Yoshimitsu Sawamoto; Matsuo Kiyoshi | Kei Haneoka | Maestro-T | 4:42 |
| 9. | "Can't Love, Wanna Love" (Aisenai Aishitai (愛せない愛したい)) | Matsuo Kiyoshi | Maestro-T | Maestro-T | 5:51 |
| 10. | "One" (Japanese version) | Jam; Kenzie | Kenzie | Kenzie | 4:04 |
| 11. | "Rising Sun" (Japanese version) | m.c.A·T; Yoo Young-jin | Yoo Young-jin | Yoo Young-jin | 4:42 |
| 12. | "Eternal" | Ryoji Sonoda | Kosuke Morimoto | Jin Nakamura | 4:36 |
| 13. | "Heart, Mind and Soul" | Matsuo Kiyoshi; Skoop on Somebody | Skoop on Somebody | Skoop on Somebody | 5:11 |
| Total length: | | | | | 57:40 |

Heart, Mind and Soul CD limited edition
| No. | Title | Lyrics | Music | Arrangement | Length |
|---|---|---|---|---|---|
| 14. | "Stay with Me Tonight" (Acappella version) | Yoshimitsu Sawamoto; Matsuo Kiyoshi | Kei Haneoka | Maestro-T | 2:35 |
| 15. | "Somebody to Love" (Acappella version) | Yoshimitsu Sawamoto; Matsuo Kiyoshi | Kei Haneoka | Daisuke Imai (Digz, Inc.) | 2:10 |
| 16. | "My Destiny" (Acappella version) | Matsuo Kiyoshi | Akihisa Matsuura | Maestro-T | 2:36 |
| 17. | "Tomorrow Will Surely Come" (Vocal & Piano Version) | Takeshi Senoo; Matsuo Kiyoshi | Takeshi Senoo | K-Muto | 2:39 |
| Total length: | | | | | 67:38 |

DVD
| No. | Title | Length |
|---|---|---|
| 1. | "Stay with Me Tonight MV" |
| 2. | "Somebody to Love MV" |
| 3. | "My Destiny MV" |
| 4. | "Asu wa Kuru Kara MV (明日は来るから, lit. Because Tomorrow Comes)" |
| 5. | "Rising Sun (Korea) MV" |
| 6. | "Tonight (Korea) MV" |

== Charts ==
| Chart (2006, 2010) | Peak position |
|---|---|
| Japanese Albums (Oricon) | 25 |
| Malaysian Chinese Albums (RIM) | 4 |
| South Korean Albums (Gaon) | 68 |

== Sales ==
| Region | Certification | Certified units/sales |
|---|---|---|
| Japan | — | 36,397 |
| South Korea | — | 29,947 |

=== Singles ===
| Date | Title | Peak position |
|---|---|---|
| 2005-04-27 | "Stay with Me Tonight" | 37 |
| 2005-07-13 | "Somebody to Love" | 14 |
| 2005-11-02 | "My Destiny" | 16 |
| 2006-03-08 | "Asu wa Kuru Kara" | 22 |
| 2006-04-19 | "Rising Sun / Heart, Mind and Soul" | 22 |

== Release history ==
| Country | Date |
|---|---|
| Japan | March 22, 2006 |
| South Korea | March 31, 2006 |
| Hong Kong | April 20, 2006 |
