= "O"-Jung.Ban.Hap. =

2006 studio album by TVXQ

- Version A and B cover

Studio album by TVXQ
- Released: September 29, 2006
- Recorded: 2006
- Studio: SM Digital Recording Studio (Seoul)
- Genres: K-pop; R&B; dance-pop
- Length: 43:50
- Language: Korean
- Label: SM

TVXQ chronology
Heart, Mind and Soul (2006)	"O"-Jung.Ban.Hap. (2006)	Five in the Black (2007)

Alternative cover
- Version C and D cover

Singles from "O"-Jung.Ban.Hap.
- 1. "'O'-Jung.Ban.Hap." Released: September 29, 2006; 2. "Balloons" Released: October 24, 2006

"O"-Jung.Ban.Hap. (stylized as "O"-正.反.合.), sometimes referred to as "O"-Union or just O, is the third Korean studio album (fourth overall) by South Korean boy group TVXQ, released through SM Entertainment on September 29, 2006. In a year when Korean music sales had slumped, it was the highest selling album in South Korea in 2006 and won the group several prominent awards in South Korea. The album stayed charted within the top 50 throughout 2007, and sold over 480,000 copies in South Korea by 2022.

The album's name "O"-Jung.Ban.Hap, literally translated to "O"-Justice.Opposition.Solution, is based on Georg Wilhelm Friedrich Hegel's theory of thesis, antithesis, synthesis. The album's lead single of the same name has lyrics that regard global conflicts with a plea for peace and resistance. The album contains a balance of fast tempo songs and ballads.

== Versions and repackaging ==
The album was released in 4 versions and packaging, versions A and B, C and D. Versions A and B promote the title song "'O'-Jung.Ban.Hap", while versions C and D promote the fantasy theme of the song "Balloons" and contain new songs and a DVD in each. The initial versions of the album with the original track listing was released in CD and cassette formats. For the version D, the label company did a unique box packaging, with special deck of cards with members' pictures wearing costumes included with the CD and DVD specials.

In Hong Kong and Taiwan, the album was released under the names "O"-Jing.Fan.Hap. and "O"-Zheng.Fan.He. respectively, while in Japan the name of the album is "O"-Sei.Han.Go.. The Japanese release does not contain the repackaged versions that are available in the Korean release.

== Singles ==
=== 'O'-Jung.Ban.Hap ===
The lead single is a fast-tempo fusion of rock, hip hop, and electronic trance. The music video took several days to complete as its footage was shot in several countries. U-Know Yunho's footage was shot in Tokyo, Micky Yoochun's and Max Changmin's in Prague, Hero Jaejoong's in Bangkok, and Xiah Junsu's in South Korea. The music video showcases intense and unique dance choreography with stylized outfits.

=== Balloons ===
In drastic contrast to the lead single, "Balloons" (Pungseon in Korean) is a bubbly song that features TVXQ members in animal costumes, made to directly appeal to the younger generation, as well as older generations familiar with the original "Balloons" by Five Fingers (an old Korean band). The lyrics talk about innocent childhood dreams and memories and how people tend to forget the importance of those dreams as they grow older. In 2011, the leader of Five Fingers, Lee Doo-heon, noted that the song's "yellow balloons" line was changed without permission to "red balloons" to coordinate with the color representing TVXQ's fanbase, Cassiopeia. Because this change was done prior to receiving permission, Lee jokingly requested 10 autographed CDs from TVXQ in exchange. The music video also included younger versions of several group's notable members, including Astro's Moonbin, iKon's Chanwoo and SF9's Chani.

== Performances ==
In three short months after the album's release, TVXQ were invited to perform on many stages of music shows, award shows, and concerts. TVXQ performed their third album's songs a few times in 2007 as well, since a fourth Korean album had not been released.

== Accolades ==
Awards and nominations
Ceremony	Year	Category	Nominee	Result	Ref.
MTV VMA Japan	2007	Best Buzz – South Korea	"'O'-Jung.Ban.Hap" (song)	Won	
Mnet KM Music Festival	2006	Song of the Year	"'O'-Jung.Ban.Hap" (song)	Nominated	
Mnet KM Music Festival	2006	Best Dance Performance	"'O'-Jung.Ban.Hap" (song)	Nominated	
Mnet KM Music Festival	2006	Best Group	"'O'-Jung.Ban.Hap" (song)	Won	
Mnet KM Music Festival	2006	Album of the Year	"O"-Jung.Ban.Hap (album)	Nominated	
Golden Disc Awards	2006	Album Daesang	"O"-Jung.Ban.Hap (album)	Won	
Golden Disc Awards	2006	Album Bonsang	"O"-Jung.Ban.Hap (album)	Won	
SBS Gayo Daejeon	2006	Grand Prize (Daesang)	"O"-Jung.Ban.Hap (album)	Won	
SBS Gayo Daejeon	2006	Main Prize (Bonsang)	"O"-Jung.Ban.Hap (album)	Won	

Music program awards
Song	Program	Date	Ref.
"'O'-Jung.Ban.Hap"	Inkigayo	October 15, 2006	
"'O'-Jung.Ban.Hap"	Inkigayo	October 29, 2006	
"'O'-Jung.Ban.Hap"	Inkigayo	November 5, 2006	
"'O'-Jung.Ban.Hap"	M Countdown	October 26, 2006	
"'O'-Jung.Ban.Hap"	M Countdown	November 9, 2006	
"Balloons"	M Countdown	December 7, 2006	

== Track listing ==
"O"-Jung.Ban.Hap. – Version A & B (Standard edition)
No.	Title	Lyrics	Music	Arrangement	Length
1.	"'O'-Jung.Ban.Hap." ("O"-정.반.합)	Yoo Young-jin	Yoo Young-jin	Yoo Young-jin	4:15
2.	"You're My Miracle" (세상에 단 하나뿐인 마음; Sesange dan hanappunin maeum)	Young-hu Kim	Young-hu Kim	Young-hu Kim	3:59
3.	"Hey! Girl"	Yoo Young-jin	Yoo Young-jin; Luther "Squeak" Jackson; Yoo Han-jin	Yoo Han-jin	4:18
4.	"Get Me Some"	Taehoon	Tommy La Verdi; Daniel Pandher	Ahn Ik-Soo	3:30
5.	"I'll Be There"	Hwang Seong-je (BJJ Music); Janie Yoo	Hwang Seong-je	Hwang Seong-je	3:29
6.	"Remember"	Kim Jeong-bae	Kenzie	Kenzie	4:16
7.	"The Story Has Just Begun" (이제 막 시작된 이야기; Ije mak sijakdoen iyagi)	Park Chang-hak; Yoon Sang	Yoon Sang	Yoon Sang; Haim	4:13
8.	"On & On"	Young-hu Kim	Carsten Lindberg (Great Dane Productions); Joachim Svares (Great Dane Productions)	Great Dane Productions	4:26
9.	"Phantom" (환영; 幻影; Hwanyeong)	Kim Jeong-bae; Micky Yoochun	Kenzie	Kenzie	3:24
10.	"You Only Love"	Lee Yoon-jae	Lee Yoon-jae	Lee Yoon-jae	3:11
11.	"Balloons" (풍선; Pungseon)	Lee Doo-heon (Five Fingers)	Kim Seong-ho	Kenzie	3:50
Total length:					43:50

"O"-Jung.Ban.Hap. – Version C & D / Japanese edition (bonus track)
No.	Title	Lyrics	Music	Arrangement	Length
6.	"White Lie" (네 곁에 숨쉴 수 있다면; Ne gyeote sumswil su itdamyeon)	Xiah Junsu	Xiah Junsu	Lee Yoon-jae	4:26
Total length:					48:16

Notes

- "White Lie" is track number 6 on versions C & D and the Japanese version, so all subsequent songs are pushed by one.
- The Japanese version does not include songs "You Only Love" and "Balloons".

"O"-Jung.Ban.Hap. DVD – Version B
No.	Title	Length
1.	"Theater Drama "Vacation" Highlight"
2.	"Theater Drama "Vacation" M/V '그리고...'" (Holding Back the Tears...)
3.	"Jacket Sketch in Prague"
4.	"Interview about TVXQ Members"
5.	"'O'-Jung.Ban.Hap. M/V Making"
6.	"'O'-Jung.Ban.Hap. M/V" (2:00 version)
7.	"TVXQ's Exclusive Story: Something New!"

"O"-Jung.Ban.Hap. DVD – Version C
No.	Title	Length
1.	"Talk 1 – Drama Theater" (Vacation introduction)
2.	"Vacation" (극장드라마; full version)
3.	"Talk 2 – Vacation" (극장드라마; NG special behind)
4.	"Vacation" (극장드라마; NG special)

"O"-Jung.Ban.Hap. DVD – Version D
No.	Title	Length
1.	"Talk 1 – The 3rd Album 'O'-Jung.Ban.Hap." (showcase introduction)
2.	"The 3rd Album 'O'-Jung.Ban.Hap. showcase" ("no cut" version)
3.	"Talk 2 – 'Hug'" (memory)
4.	"Hug" (music video)
5.	"Talk 3 – 'The Way U Are'" (memory)
6.	"The Way U Are" (music video)
7.	"Talk 4 – 'Believe'" (memory)
8.	"Believe" (music video)
9.	"Talk 5 – 'Tri-Angle'" (memory)
10.	"Tri-Angle" (music video)
11.	"Talk 6 – 'Rising Sun'" (memory)
12.	"Rising Sun" (music video)
13.	"Talk 7 – 'O'-Jung.Ban.Hap.'" (memory)
14.	"'O'-Jung.Ban.Hap." (music video)
15.	"Talk 8 – 'Balloons'" (memory)
16.	"Balloons" (music video)
17.	"Balloons" (M/V making)
18.	"TVXQ's Exclusive Story 2: Our Secret Code++"

== Charts ==
=== Weekly charts ===
Chart (2006)	Peak position
Taiwanese Albums (G-Music)	5

Chart (2010)	Peak position
South Korean Albums (Gaon)	5

=== Monthly charts ===
Chart (2006)	Peak position
South Korean Albums (RIAK)	1

=== Year-end charts ===
Chart (2006)	Position
South Korean Albums (RIAK)	1

Chart (2007)	Position
South Korean Albums (MIAK)	22

== Sales ==
Region	Certification	Certified units/sales
South Korea	—	480,000

== Release history ==
Country	Date	Version	Format(s)	Label
South Korea	September 29, 2006	Version A & B	CD; cassette; DVD; digital download	SM Entertainment
South Korea	September 29, 2006	Version C & D	CD; cassette; DVD; digital download	SM Entertainment
Taiwan	October 12, 2006	Taiwanese edition	CD	Avex Taiwan
Japan	October 23, 2006	Japanese edition	CD + DVD	Avex; Rhythm Zone
