= List of South Korean boy bands =

South Korean boy bands refer to South Korea's all-male idol groups who account for a large portion of the K-pop industry. Korean boy bands have aided in the global spread and promotion of Korean culture through their demonstrated prominence and popularity. The emergence of hip-hop music act Seo Taiji and Boys in 1992 shifted the focus of the Korean music industry to teen-centred pop music. Idol bands of young boys or girls were formed to cater to a growing teenage audience. In 1995, Lee Soo-man, the founder of SM Entertainment, brought the idol trainee system to South Korea, which further solidified the format for idol bands and modern Korean pop culture.

Major boy bands from the late 90s and early 2000s, such as H.O.T., Sechs Kies, Shinhwa, and g.o.d, who were trained with the idol system, are cited to help build the foundations as the first successful all-male groups in Korea and as pioneers of the first Hallyu Wave. From 2007 onward, second generation groups, such as BigBang, TVXQ, Super Junior, 2PM, Shinee, Beast, and Infinite, continued to grow the popularity of boy bands domestically in Korea, as well as globally through the second phase of Hallyu. The rise of groups such as Exo and BTS in 2012 and 2013 launched the third generation of boy bands and introduced K-pop to mass global appeal. BTS, in particular, has attained mainstream Western appeal with number-one hits on the Billboard charts and multiple collaborations with several global artists, including Coldplay, Nicki Minaj, and Halsey. Other major boy bands that debuted from 2012 onward include Seventeen, NCT, Stray Kids, Tomorrow X Together, Ateez, and Enhypen, all of whom continue to garner widespread attention and build K-pop's global appeal.

== First generation ==
South Korean boy bands that debuted in the 90s to 2002, arranged in alphabetical order.

- 1TYM (1998–2006, 2008)
- 5tion (2001–2006, since 2010)
- Black Beat (2002–2007)
- Click-B (1999–2006, 2011, 2015)
- Deux (1993–95)
- DJ DOC (1994–2018, 2024)
- Epik High (since 2001)
- Every Single Day (since 1994)
- Flower (1999–2006, since 2010)
- F-iV (since 2002)
- Fly to the Sky (1999–2009, 2014–19)
- g.o.d (1999–2005, since 2014)
- H.O.T. (1996–2001, 2018-19)
- Jinusean (1997–2004, 2015–20)
- jtL (2001–03)
- J-Walk (2002, since 2007)
- K-pop (2001–03, 2018)
- Noel (2002–06, since 2011)
- NRG (1997–2005, 2017–18)
- Shinhwa (since 1998)
- Sechs Kies (1997–2000, 2016–21)
- Sweet Sorrow (since 2002)
- The Blue (1990s, 2009, 2014)
- Turbo (1995–2001, 2015–17)
- U-BeS (1997–99)
- UN (2000–05)
- Yurisangja (since 1997)

== Second generation ==
South Korean boy bands that debuted in 2003 to 2011, arranged in alphabetical order.

=== Best-selling boy bands ===
Best-selling generation two South Korean boy bands
Group and years active	Notable singles	Platinum-certified albums
2AM (2008–14, since 2021)	"Can't Let You Go Even If I Die" (2010) (Note: Number-one song on South Korea's Circle Digital Chart, formerly Gaon Digital Chart.) (Note: Top-ten song on Japan's Oricon Singles Chart.); "I Was Wrong" (2010) (Note: Top-ten song on South Korea's Circle Digital Chart, formerly Gaon Digital Chart.); "You Wouldn't Answer My Calls" (2010); "Like Crazy" (2010); "I Wonder If You Hurt Like Me" (2012); "One Day" (2012); "For You: Kimi no Tame ni Dekiru Koto" (2012); "Darenimo Watasenai Yo" (2012); "One Spring Day" (2013); "Days Like Today" (2014)	—N/a
2PM (2008–17, since 2021)	"10 Out of 10" (2008); "Again & Again" (2009); "I Hate You" (2009); "Heartbeat" (2009); "Without U" (2010); "I'll Be Back" (2010); "Take Off" (2011); "Hands Up" (2011); "I'm Your Man" (2011); "Ultra Lover" (2011) (Note: The song is certified Gold in physical sales, by the Recording Industry Association of Japan.); "Beautiful" (2011); "One Day" (2012); "Masquerade" (2012); "Comeback When You Hear This Song" (2013); "Give Me Love" (2013); "Winter Games" (2013) (Note: Number-one song on Japan's Oricon Singles Chart.); "Go Crazy!" (2014); "Guilty Love" (2015); "My House" (2015); "Higher" (2015); "Promise (I'll Be)" (2016)	—N/a
B1A4 (since 2011)	"Beautiful Target" (2011); "Baby Good Night" (2012); "Tried to Walk" (2012); "What's Happening?" (2013); "Lonely" (2014); "Solo Day" (2014); "White Miracle" (2015); "Happy Days" (2015); "A Lie" (2016); "You and I" (2017); "Do You Remember" (2018); "Aerumade" (2018)	—N/a
Beast / Highlight (since 2009)	"Bad Girl" (2009); "Shock" (2010); "Breath" (2010); "Beautiful" (2010); "On Rainy Days" (2010); "Fiction" (2011); "I Knew It" (2012); "Midnight" (2012); "Beautiful Night" (2012); "Will You Be Alright?" (2013); "I'm Sorry" (2013); "Shadow" (2013); "Sad Movie / Kurisumasu Kyaroru no Koro ni wa" (2013); "No More" (2014); "Good Luck" (2014); "12:30" (2014); "Adrenaline" (2015); "Kimi wa Dou?" (2015); "One" (2015); "Hands Up" (2015); "Can't Wait to Love You" (2015); "This Is My Life" (2015); "Gotta Go to Work" (2015); "YeY" (2015); "Saigo no Hitokoto" (2015); "Stay Forever Young" (2015); "Guess Who?" (2016); "Butterfly" (2016); "Ribbon" (2016); "Freaking Cute" (2016); "Whole Lotta Lovin'" (2016); "It's Still Beautiful" (2017); "Plz Don't Be Sad" (2017); "Calling You" (2017); "Can Be Better" (2017)	—N/a
BigBang (2006–18, since 2022)	"Lies" (2007); "Last Farewell" (2007); "Haru Haru" (2008); "Sunset Glow" (2008); "My Heaven" (2009); "Gara Gara Go!" (2009) (Note: The song is certified Gold in digital sales by the Recording Industry Association of Japan.); "Koe o Kikasete" (2009) (Note: The song is certified Platinum in digital sales by the Recording Industry Association of Japan.); "Tell Me Goodbye" (2010); "Beautiful Hangover" (2010); "Tonight" (2011); "Love Song" (2011); "Blue" (2012); "Bad Boy" (2012); "Fantastic Baby" (2012) (Note: The song is certified Gold in streaming, by the Recording Industry Association of Japan.) (Note: The song is certified 2× Platinum in digital sales by the Recording Industry Association of Japan.); "Monster" (2012); "Loser" (2015); "Bae Bae" (2015); "Bang Bang Bang" (2015); "We Like 2 Party" (2015); "If You" (2015); "Sober" (2015); "Let's Not Fall in Love" (2015); "Fxxk It" (2016); "Last Dance" (2016); "Flower Road" (2018) (Note: The song is certified Platinum in streaming, by the Korea Music Content Association.) (Note: The song is certified Platinum in download, by the Korea Music Content Association.); "Still Life" (2022) (Note: Top-ten song on the Billboard Global 200.)	—N/a
Block B (since 2011)	"I'll Close My Eyes" (2012); "Nillili Mambo" (2012); "Very Good" (2013); "Jackpot" (2014); "H.E.R" (2014); "A Few Years Later" (2016); "Toy" (2016); "Yesterday" (2017)	—N/a
CNBLUE (since 2009)	"I'm a Loner" (2010); "Love" (2010); "Intuition" (2011); "In My Head" (2011); "Where You Are" (2011); "Robot" (2011); "Still in Love" (2012); "Hey You" (2012); "I'm Sorry" (2013); "Blind Love" (2013); "Lady" (2013); "Can't Stop" (2014); "Truth" (2014); "Go Your Way" (2014); "White" (2015); "Cinderella" (2015); "Puzzle" (2016); "Shake" (2017); "Zoom" (2021)	—N/a
F.T. Island (since 2007)	"Lovesick" (2007); "Thunder" (2007); "Until You Come Back" (2007); "After Love (2007); "Love Love Love" (2010); "Hello Hello" (2010); "Severely" (2012); "I Wish" (2012)	—N/a
Infinite (since 2010)	"Come Back Again" (2010); "She's Back" (2010); "BTD (Before the Dawn)" (2011); "Be Mine" (2011); "Paradise" (2011); "White Confession (Lately)" (2011); "The Chaser" (2012); "Man in Love" (2013); "Destiny" (2013); "Last Romeo" (2014); "Back" (2014); "Dilemma" (2014); "24 Jikan" (2015); "Bad" (2015); "The Eye" (2016)	—N/a
MBLAQ (2009-15)	"Oh Yeah" (2009); "Y" (2010); "Your Luv" (2011); "Mona Lisa" (2011); "Baby U!" (2011); "Scribble" (2012); "This Is War" (2012)	—N/a
Shinee (since 2008)	"Replay" (2008); "Love Like Oxygen" (2008); "Juliette" (2009); "Ring Ding Dong" (2009); "Lucifer" (2010); "Hello" (2010); "Sherlock (Clue +Note)" (2012); "Dazzling Girl" (2012); "1000nen, Zutto Soba ni Ite..." (2012); "Dream Girl" (2013); "Fire" (2013); "Boys Meet U" (2013); "Everybody" (2013); "3 2 1 (2013); "Lucky Star" (2014); "Your Number" (2015); "View" (2015); "Married to the Music" (2015); "Sing Your Song" (2015); "Kimi no Seide" (2016); "1 of 1" (2016); "Tell Me What to Do" (2016); "Winter Wonderland" (2016); "Good Evening" (2018); "I Want You" (2018) (Note: Top-ten song on the Billboard K-pop Hot 100.); "Sunny Side" (2018); "Don't Call Me" (2021); "Hard" (2023)	Don't Call Me (2021); Hard (2023)
SS501 (2005-10, since 2024)	"Warning" (2005); "Never Again" (2005); "Snow Prince" (2005); "4Chance" (2006); "Kokoro" (2007); "Distance" (2007); "Deja Vu" (2008); "Lucky Days" (2008); "U R Man" (2008); "Love Like This" (2009)	—N/a
Super Junior (since 2005)	"Don't Don" (2007); "U / Twins" (2008); "It's You" (2009); "Sorry Sorry" (2009) (Note: Circle Chart did not exist at that time. However, the song received 3,000,000 sales.); "Bonamana" (2010); "Mr Simple" (2011); "Sexy, Free & Single" (2012); "Spy" (2012); "Opera" (2013); "Blue World" (2013); "Mamacita" (2014); "Devil / Magic" (2016); "One More Time" (2018)	Time Slip (2019); The Renaissance (2021); Super Junior25 (2025)
Teen Top (since 2010)	"Clap" (2010); "Going Crazy" (2012); "Be Ma Girl" (2012); "Miss Right" (2013); "Rocking" (2013); "Missing" (2014)	—N/a
TVXQ (since 2003)	"Hug" (2004) (Note: Circle Chart did not exist at that time. However, the song peaked at #4 on the MIAK charts for the month of January 2004. It entered the Circle Album Chart in 2014 and peaked at #12 for the week of January 12–18, 2014.); "Sky" (2006); "Miss You" (2006); "O"-Sei.Han.Gō" (2006); "Step by Step" (2007); "Choosy Lover" (2007); "Lovin' You" (2007); "Summer Dream" (2007); "Song for You" (2007); "Love in the Ice" (2007); "Shine" (2007); "Ride On" (2007); "Forever Love" (2007); "Together" (2007); "Purple Line" (2008); "Runaway" (2008); "Close to You" (2008); "Keyword" (2008); "Beautiful You" (2008); "Sennen Koi Uta" (2008); "Dōshite Kimi o Suki ni Natte Shimattandarō?" (2008) (Note: The song is certified 2× Platinum in digital sales by the Recording Industry Association of Japan.); "Mirotic" (2008); "Bolero" (2009); "Kiss the Baby" (2009); "Wasurenaide" (2009); "Survivor" (2009); "Share the World" (2009) (Note: The song is certified 3× Platinum in digital sales by the Recording Industry Association of Japan.); "We Are!" (2009); "Stand by U" (2009) (Note: The song is certified Platinum in digital sales by the Recording Industry Association of Japan.) (Note: The song is certified Gold in retail sales by the Recording Industry Association of Japan.); "Break Out!" (2010) (Note: The song is certified Platinum in physical sales, by the Recording Industry Association of Japan.); "Toki o Tomete" (2010); "Keep Your Head Down" (2011); "Superstar" (2011); "Winter Rose" (2011); "Duet (Winter version)" (2011); "Still" (2012); "Android" (2012); "Catch Me" (2013); "Ocean" (2013); "Scream" (2013); "Very Merry Xmas" (2013); "Hide & Seek" (2013); "Something" (2014); "Sweat" (2014); "Answer" (2014); "Time Works Wonders" (2014); "Sakuramichi" (2015); "Reboot" (2017); "Road" (2018); "Jealous" (2018); "Hot Hot Hot" (2019); "Mirrors" (2019); "Manazashi" (2020); "Utsuroi" (2022); "Parallel Parallel" (2023); "Lime & Lemon" (2023)	The Secret Code (2009); Best Selection 2010 (2010); Tone (2011); Time (2013); Tree (2014); With (2014)

=== Other notable groups ===
- AA (2011–15)
- Apeace (2011–21)
- Battle (2006–10, 2019)
- Boyfriend (2011–19, since 2021)
- DMTN (2009–13, since 2020)
- F.Cuz (since 2010)
- Homme (2010–18)
- Led Apple (2010–16)
- M.I.B (2011–17)
- Monday Kiz (2005–08, 2010–14)
- Myname (since 2011)
- N-Sonic (2011–16)
- N-Train (2011–13)
- One Way (2010–16)
- Paran (2005–11)
- S (2003, 2014)
- Shu-I (2009–15)
- Supernova (since 2007)
- T-max (2007–12)
- The Boss (since 2010)
- Touch (2010-16)
- Tritops (since 2007)
- U-KISS (since 2008)
- Ulala Session (since 2011)
- V.O.S (since 2004)
- Vibe (since 2002)
- Wanted (2004–12)
- ZE:A (2010–17)

== Third generation ==
South Korean boy bands that debuted in 2012 to 2017, arranged in alphabetical order.

=== Best-selling boy bands ===
Best-selling generation three South Korean boy bands
Group and years active	Notable singles	Platinum-certified albums
Astro (since 2016)	"Baby" (2017); "After Midnight" (2021); "Candy Sugar Pop" (2022)	All Yours (2021); Switch On (2021); Drive to the Starry Road (2022)
B.A.P (2012–19, since 2024)	"No Mercy" (2012); "Warrior" (2013); "One Shot" (2013); "1004 (Angel)" (2014); "Excuse Me" (2014); "Feel So Good" (2016); "Fly High" (2016); "Wake Me Up" (2017); "Honey Moon" (2017); "Hands Up" (2017)	—N/a
BtoB (since 2012)	"WOW" (2012); "The Winter's Tale" (2014); "It's Okay" (2015); "Mirai (Ashita)" (2015); "Summer Color My Girl" (2015); "Way Back Home" (2015); "Dear Bride" (2016); "L.U.V" (2016); "Pray (I'll Be Your Man)" (2016); "Movie" (2017); "Missing You" (2017); "Only One for Me" (2018); "Friend" (2018); "Beautiful Pain" (2018); "The Song" (2022)	—N/a
BTS (since 2013)	"No More Dream" (2013); "Boy in Luv" (2014); "Danger" (2014); "I Need U" (2015); "For You" (2015); "Dope" (2015); "Run" (2015) (Note: The song is certified Platinum by Music Canada.); "Fire" (2016); "Save Me" (2016); "Blood, Sweat & Tears" (2016) (Note: The song is certified Platinum in streaming, by the Recording Industry Association of Japan.) (Note: The song is certified Silver by the British Phonographic Industry.); "Spring Day" (2017); "Not Today" (2017); "DNA" (2017) (Note: The song is certified 2× Platinum in physical sales, by the Recording Industry Association of Japan.) (Note: The song is certified Gold by the Recording Industry Association of America.) (Note: The song is certified Gold by the Australian Recording Industry Association, and Silver by the British Phonographic Industry.); "Crystal Snow" (2017); "Mic Drop" (2017) (Note: The song is certified Platinum by the Recording Industry Association of America.); "Don't Leave Me" (2018); "Fake Love" (2018); "Idol" (2018); "Airplane Pt. 2" (2018); "Lights" (2018) (Note: The song is certified Million in physical sales, by the Recording Industry Association of Japan.); "Boy with Luv" (2019) (Note: The song is certified 3× Platinum in streaming, by the Korea Music Content Association.) (Note: The song is certified Platinum by the Australian Recording Industry Association, Gold by the British Phonographic Industry, and Gold by Music Canada.); "Make It Right" (2019) (Note: The song is certified Gold by the Australian Recording Industry Association.); "Black Swan" (2020); "On" (2020) (Note: The song is certified Gold by the Australian Recording Industry Association.); "Stay Gold" (2020) (Note: The song is certified 2× Platinum in streaming, by the Recording Industry Association of Japan.); "Your Eyes Tell" (2020); "Dynamite" (2020) (Note: Number-one song on the Billboard Hot 100.) (Note: Number-one song on the Billboard Global 200.) (Note: The song is certified 2× Platinum in streaming, by the Korea Music Content Association.) (Note: The song is certified Diamond in physical sales, by the Recording Industry Association of Japan.) (Note: The song is certified 5× Platinum by the Recording Industry Association of America.) (Note: The song is certified 2× Platinum by the Australian Recording Industry Association, Platinum by the British Phonographic Industry, 5× Platinum by Music Canada, 2× Platinum in digital sales by the Recording Industry Association of Japan, and Platinum by Recorded Music NZ.); "Life Goes On" (2020) (Note: The song is certified 2× Platinum by the Recording Industry Association of America.); "Film Out (2021) (Note: Top-ten song on the Billboard Global 200.); "Butter" (2021) (Note: The song is certified Gold by the British Phonographic Industry, 3× Platinum by Music Canada, and Platinum in digital sales by the Recording Industry Association of Japan.); "Permission to Dance" (2021) (Note: The song is certified 3× Platinum in streaming, by the Recording Industry Association of Japan.); "My Universe" (2021) (Note: The song is certified Platinum by the Australian Recording Industry Association, Platinum by the British Phonographic Industry, and Gold by Music Canada.); "Yet to Come (The Most Beautiful Moment)" (2022); "Bad Decisions" (2022) (Note: Top-ten song on the Billboard Hot 100.); "Take Two" (2023); "Swim" (2026)	Face Yourself (2018); Love Yourself: Tear (2018); Love Yourself: Answer (2018); Map of the Soul: Persona (2019); BTS World: Original Soundtrack (2019); Map of the Soul: 7 (2020); Map of the Soul: 7 - The Journey (2020); Be (2020); BTS, the Best (2021); Butter (2021); Proof (2023); Permission to Dance on Stage – Live (2025); 2025 BTS Festa: Capsule Album Vol.1 (2025); Arirang (2026)
Day6 (since 2015)	"You Were Beautiful" (2017); "Time of Our Life" (2019); "Welcome to the Show" (2024); "Melt Down" (2024)	—N/a
Exo (since 2012)	"Wolf" (2012); "Growl" (2013); "Miracles in December" (2013); "Overdose" (2014); "December, 2014 (The Winter's Tale)" (2014); "Call Me Baby" (2015); "Love Me Right" (2015); "Lightsaber"(2015); "Sing for You" (2015); "Unfair"(2015); "Lucky One" (2015); "Monster" (2016); "Lotto" (2016); "Dancing King" (2016); "Coming Over" (2016); "For Life" (2016); "Ko Ko Bop" (2017); "Power" (2017); "Universe" (2017); "Tempo" (2018); "Love Shot" (2018); "Obsession" (2019); "Let Me In" (2023) (Note: Top-ten song on Billboard South Korea Songs.); "Hear Me Out" (2023); "Cream Soda" (2023)	Don't Mess Up My Tempo (2018); Love Shot (2018); Obsession (2019); Don't Fight the Feeling (2021); Exist (2023); Reverxe (2026)
Got7 (since 2014)	"Around the World"(2014); "Love Train" (2015); "Laugh Laugh Laugh" (2015); "If You Do" (2015); "Fly"(2016); "Hard Carry" (2016); "Never Ever" (2017); "You Are" (2017); "My Swagger" (2017); "Look" (2018); "THE New Era" (2018); "Lullaby"(2018); "Eclipse" (2019)	Eyes on You (2018); Present: You (2018); Spinning Top (2019); Call My Name (2019); Dye (2020); Breath of Love: Last Piece (2020); Got7 (2022)
iKon (since 2015)	"My Type" (2015); "Rhythm Ta" (2015); "Apology" (2015); "Dumb & Dumber" (2016); "#WYD" (2016); "Love Scenario" (2018); "Killing Me" (2018); "Goodbye Road" (2018)	—N/a
Monsta X (since 2015)	"Hero" (2015); "Beautiful" (2017); "Spotlight" (2018); "Livin' It Up" (2018); "Shoot Out" (2018); "Alligator" (2019); "Wish on the Sky" (2020); "Love Killa" (2020); "Wanted" (2021)	Take.1 Are You There? (2018); Take.2 We Are Here (2019); Follow: Find You (2019); Fantasia X (2020); Fatal Love (2020); One of a Kind (2021); No Limit (2021); Shape of Love (2022); Reason (2023); The X (2025)
NCT (Note: The group consists of 25 members divided into six different sub-units: NCT U, NCT 127, NCT Dream, WayV, NCT DoJaeJung (three members from NCT 127), NCT Wish, and NCT JNJM (two members from NCT DREAM).) (since 2016)	"We Go Up" (2018) (NCT Dream); "Boom" (2019) (NCT Dream); "Kick It" (2020) (NCT 127); "Punch" (2020) (NCT 127); "Hot Sauce" (2021) (NCT Dream); "Hello Future" (2021) (NCT Dream); "Sticker" (2021) (NCT 127); "Favorite (Vampire)" (2021) (NCT 127); "Glitch Mode" (2022) (NCT Dream); "Beatbox" (2022) (NCT Dream); "2 Baddies" (2022) (NCT 127); "Candy" (2022) (NCT Dream); "Ay-Yo" (2023) (NCT 127); "Best Friend Ever" (2023) (NCT Dream); "ISTJ" (2023) (NCT Dream); "Fact Check" (2023) (NCT 127); "Be There for Me" (2023) (NCT 127); "Wish" (2024) (NCT Wish); "Smoothie" (2024) (NCT Dream); "Songbird" (2024) (NCT Wish); "Walk" (2024) (NCT 127); "When I'm with You" (2024) (NCT Dream)	We Go Up (2018) (NCT Dream); NCT 2018 Empathy (2018); Regular-Irregular (2018) (NCT 127); Regulate (2018) (NCT 127); We Boom (2019) (NCT Dream); Neo Zone (2020) (NCT 127); Reload (2020) (NCT Dream); Neo Zone: The Final Round (2020) (NCT 127); NCT 2020 Resonance Pt.1 (2020); NCT 2020 Resonance Pt.2 (2020); Kick Back (2021) (WayV); Hot Sauce (2021) (NCT Dream); Hello Future (2021) (NCT Dream); Glitch Mode (2021) (NCT Dream); Beatbox (2021) (NCT Dream); Sticker (2021) (NCT 127); Favorite (2021) (NCT 127); Universe (2021); 2 Baddies (2022) (NCT 127); Candy (2022) (NCT Dream); Ay-Yo (2023) (NCT 127); Best Friend Ever (2023) (NCT Dream); ISTJ (2023) (NCT Dream); Fact Check (2023) (NCT 127); On My Youth (2023) (WayV); Be There for Me (2023) (NCT 127); Wish (2024) (NCT Wish); Dream()scape (2024) (NCT Dream); Give Me That (2024) (WayV); Songbird (2024) (NCT Wish); Walk (2024) (NCT 127); Steady (2024) (NCT Wish); Frequency (2024) (WayV); Go Back to the Future (2025) (NCT Dream); Big Bands (2025) (WayV); Color (2025) (NCT Wish); Beat It Up (2025) (NCT Dream)
NU'EST (2012-22)	"Nanananamida" (2017); "Bet Bet" (2019); "I'm in Trouble" (2020); "Inside Out" (2021)	Happily Ever After (2019)
Seventeen (Note: The group consists of 13 members divided into five different sub-units: BSS, JxW, Hoshi X Woozi, S.Coups X Mingyu, and DK X Seungkwan (two members from BSS).) (since 2015)	"Mansae" (2015); "Pretty U" (2016); "Very Nice" (2016); "Don't Wanna Cry" (2017) (Note: Number-one song on the Billboard K-pop Hot 100.); "Clap" (2017); "Oh My!" (2018); "Home" (2019); "Hit" (2019); "Happy Ending" (2019); "Fear" (2019); "Fallin' Flower" (2020); "Left & Right" (2020); "Ready to Love" (2021); "Not Alone" (2021); "Power of Love" (2021); "Rock with You" (2021); "Darl+ing" (2022); "Hot" (2022); "_World" (2022); "Super" (2023); "F*ck My Life" (2023); "God of Music" (2023); "Maestro" (2024); "Love, Money, Fame" (2024); "Shohikigen" (2024)	Special Album 'Director's Cut' (2018); You Make My Day (2018); You Made My Dawn (2019); An Ode (2019); Heng:garæ (2020); 24H (2020); Semicolon (2020); Dream (2020); Your Choice (2021); Attacca (2021); Face the Sun (2022); Sector 17 (2022); Second Wind (2023) (BSS); FML (2023); Always Yours (2023); Seventeenth Heaven (2023); 17 Is Right Here (2024); This Man (2024) (JxW); Spill the Feels (2024); Teleparty (2025) (BSS); Beam (2025) (HxW); Happy Burstday (2025); Hype Vibes (2025) (CxM); Serenade (2026) (DxS)
The Boyz (since 2017)	"Maverick" (2021); "Roar" (2023)	Chase (2020); Thrill-ing (2021); Be Aware (2022); Phantasy Pt.1: Christmas in August (2023); Phantasy Pt.2: Sixth Sense (2023); Phantasy Pt.3: Love Letter (2024); Trigger (2024); Unexpected (2025); A;Effect (2025)
VIXX (since 2012)	"Voodoo Doll" (2013); "Eternity" (2014); "Error" (2014); "Love Equation" (2015); "Can't Say" (2015); "Chained Up" (2015); "Hana-Kaze" (2016); "The Closer" (2016)	—N/a
Wanna One (2017-19, since 2026)	"Energetic" (2017); "Burn It Up" (2017); "Beautiful" (2017); "I Promise You (I.P.U)" (2018); "Boomerang" (2018); "Light" (2018); "Spring Breeze" (2018)	0+1=1 (I Promise You) (2018); 1÷x=1 (Undivided) (2018); 1¹¹=1 (Power of Destiny) (2018)
Winner (since 2013)	"Empty" (2014); "Color Ring" (2014); "Sentimental" (2016); "Baby Baby" (2016); "Really Really" (2017); "Fool" (2017); "Love Me Love Me" (2017); "Everyday" (2018); "Millions" (2018); "Ah Yeah" (2019)	—N/a

=== Other notable groups ===
- 14U (2017–19)
- 100% (2012–21)
- 2000 Won (since 2013)
- 24K+ (since 2012)
- 5urprise (2013–20)
- A.C.E (since 2017)
- A.cian (2012–20)
- A-Jax (2012–19)
- A-Prince (2012–15)
- AlphaBat (since 2013)
- B.I.G (2014-2024)
- Beatwin (2014–17)
- Big Brain (since 2015)
- Big Star (2012–19)
- Bigflo (since 2014)
- Boys24 (2016–17)
- Boys Republic (2013–18)
- C-Clown (2012–15)
- Cross Gene (2012-2018)
- Golden Child (since 2017)
- GreatGuys (2017–25)
- HALO (2014–19)
- HeartB (2014–15)
- High4 (2014–17)
- History (2013–17)
- HNB (2017–19)
- Honey G (since 2012)
- Honeyst (2017–19)
- Hooni Yongi (since 2011)
- Hotshot (2014–21)
- Hyeongseop X Euiwoong (2017–18)
- Imfact (2016–23)
- IZ (2017–23)
- JBJ (2017–18)
- JJCC (Since 2014)
- K-Much (2014–18)
- KNK (since 2016)
- Longguo & Shihyun (2017–18)
- LC9 (2013-15)
- Lunafly (2012–16)
- M.O.N.T (since 2017)
- M.Pire (2013–15)
- M4M (2013–14, since 2018)
- Madtown (2014–17)
- Masc (2016–20)
- Map6 (2015–19)
- Mr.Mr (2012–21)
- MVP (2017–22)
- MXM (2017–18)
- Myteen (2017–19)
- N.Flying (since 2013)
- Newkidd (since 2017)
- ONF (since 2017)
- Pentagon (since 2016)
- Rainz (2017–18)
- Romeo (2015–21)
- Seven O'Clock (2017–21)
- SF9 (since 2016)
- Skye (since 2017)
- Snuper (2015–23)
- Spectrum (2018–20)
- Tasty (2012–15)
- The Legend (2014–17)
- The Rose (since 2017)
- Toheart (2014)
- Topp Dogg (2013–21)
- TRCNG (2017–22)
- Troy (since 2014)
- TST (2017–20)
- Up10tion (since 2015)
- Uniq (2014–18)
- UNVS (since 2016)
- Varsity (since 2017)
- VAV (2015–24)
- Victon (since 2016)
- Voisper (2016–21)
- Vromance (2016–24)
- Wonder Boyz (2012–14)

== Fourth generation ==
South Korean boy bands that debuted since 2018, arranged in alphabetical order.

=== Best-selling boy bands ===
Generation four South Korean boy bands that have at least one million-selling album from Korea Music Content Association.

Best-selling generation four South Korean boy bands
Group and years active	Notable singles	Million-certified albums
Alpha Drive One (since 2026)	—N/a	Euphoria (2026)
Ateez (since 2018)	"Dreamers" (2019); "Limitless" (2023); "Not Okay" (2024); "Birthday" (2024); "Adrenaline" (2026)	The World EP.1: Movement (2022); The World EP.2: Outlaw (2023); The World EP.Fin: Will (2023); Golden Hour: Part.1 (2024); Golden Hour: Part.2 (2024)
BoyNextDoor (since 2023)	"Earth, Wind & Fire" (2024); "If I Say, I Love You" (2025); "Count to Love" (2026)	No Genre (2025); The Action (2025)
Cortis (since 2025)	"RedRed" (2026)	Color Outside the Lines (2025); GreenGreen (2026)
Enhypen (since 2020)	"Given-Taken" (2020); "Let Me In (20 Cube)" (2020); "Drunk-Dazed" (2021); "Tamed-Dashed" (2021); "Bite Me" (2023); "Blossom" (2023); "Bills" (2023); "Shine on Me" (2025)	Border: Carnival (2020); Dimension: Dilemma (2021); Manifesto: Day 1 (2022); Dark Blood (2023); Orange Blood (2023); Romance: Untold (2024); Romance: Untold -Daydream- (2024); Desire: Unleash (2025); The Sin: Vanish (2026)
Riize (since 2023)	"Love 119" (2024); "Lucky" (2024); "Fly Up" (2025); "All of You" (2026)	Get a Guitar (2023); Riizing (2024); Odyssey (2025)
Stray Kids (since 2018)	"Miroh" (2019); "Top" (2020); "God's Menu" (2020); "Back Door" (2020); "Thunderous" (2021); "Scars" (2021); "Maniac" (2022); "Case 143" (2022); "S-Class" (2023); "Lalalala" (2023) (Note: Top-ten song on the Billboard Global 200.); "Chk Chk Boom" (2024); "Ceremony" (2025)	Noeasy (2021); Christmas EveL (2021); Oddinary (2022); Maxident (2022); 5-Star (2023); Social Path / Super Bowl (Japanese Ver.) (2023); Rock-Star (2023); Ate (2024); Hop (2024); Karma (2025); Do It (2025)
Tomorrow X Together (since 2019)	"9 and Three Quarters (Run Away)" (2019); "Drama" (2020); "Good Boy Gone Bad" (2022); "Deja Vu" (2024); "We'll Never Change" (2024) (Note: The song is certified 3× Platinum in physical sales, by the Recording Industry Association of Japan.); "Stick with You" (2026)	Minisode1: Blue Hour (2020); The Chaos Chapter: Freeze (2021); The Chaos Chapter: Fight or Escape (2021); Minisode 2: Thursday's Child (2022); The Name Chapter: Temptation (2023); The Name Chapter: Freefall (2023); Minisode 3: Tomorrow (2024); The Star Chapter: Together (2025); 7th Year: A Moment of Stillness in the Thorns (2026)
Treasure (since 2020)	"Here I Stand" (2023)	Reboot (2023); Love Pulse (2025)
TWS (since 2024)	"Plot Twist" (2024); "Nice to See You Again" (2025)	No Tragedy (2026)
Zerobaseone (since 2023)	"In Bloom" (2023); "Yura Yura (Unmei no Hana)" (2024)	Youth in the Shade (2023); Melting Point (2023); Cinema Paradise (2024); Blue Paradise (2025); Never Say Never (2025)

=== Other notable groups ===
- 1Team (2019–21)
- 1the9 (2019–20)
- 1Verse (since 2025)
- 8Turn (since 2023)
- 82Major (since 2023)
- AB6IX (since 2019)
- AHOF (since 2025)
- Aimers (since 2022)
- All(H)Ours (since 2024)
- Ampers&One (since 2023)
- And2ble (since 2026)
- Argon (2019–21)
- ARrC (2024–26)
- ATBO (2022–25)
- AxMxP (since 2025)
- B.D.U (2024–26)
- BAE173 (2020–26)
- BDC (since 2019)
- Blank2y (2022–23)
- Blitzers (since 2021)
- BXB (2023–26)
- Ciipher (2021–25)
- CIX (2019–26)
- Close Your Eyes (since 2025)
- Cravity (since 2020)
- Daily:Direction (since 2026)
- D-Crunch (2018–22)
- D1ce (2019–23)
- DKB (since 2020)
- DKZ (2019–26)
- Dragon Pony (since 2024)
- Drippin (since 2020)
- Dxmon (since 2024)
- E'Last (2020–26)
- ENOi (2019–21)
- Epex (since 2021)
- Evnne (since 2023)
- Fantasy Boys (since 2023)
- Flare U (since 2026)
- Ghost9 (since 2020)
- Hori7on (since 2023)
- Idid (since 2025)
- Idntt (since 2025)
- Just B (since 2021)
- KickFlip (since 2025)
- Lngshot (since 2026)
- Lucy (since 2020)
- Luminous (2021–25)
- Lun8 (since 2023)
- MCND (since 2020)
- Mirae (2021–24)
- Newbeat (since 2025)
- Noir (2018–23)
- NOMAD (2024–26)
- Nouera (since 2025)
- Nowz (since 2024)
- NTB (2018–21)
- NTX (since 2020)
- N.SSign (since 2023)
- Omega X (since 2021)
- One Pact (since 2023)
- Oneus (since 2019)
- Onewe (since 2019)
- OnlyOneOf (since 2019)
- P1Harmony (since 2020)
- Plave (since 2023)
- Pow (since 2023)
- Superkind (2022–25)
- SuperM (2019–21)
- TAN (2022–24)
- Target (2018–20)
- Teen Teen (2019–21)
- Tempest (2022–26)
- TFN (2021–24)
- The KingDom (since 2021)
- The Wind (since 2023)
- TIOT (since 2023)
- TNX (since 2022)
- TO1 (2020-23)
- Trendz (since 2022)
- Vanner (since 2019)
- Verivery (since 2019)
- W24 (since 2018)
- Waker (since 2024)
- Waterfire (2024)
- WAYF Boys (since 2026)
- We in the Zone (2019–21)
- WEi (since 2020)
- X1 (2019–20)
- Xdinary Heroes (since 2021)
- Xikers (since 2023)
- Xlov (since 2025)
- Xodiac (since 2023)
- Younite (since 2022)

== See also ==
- List of South Korean idol groups
- List of South Korean girl groups
