= With: Live Tour =

2015 concert tour by Tohoshinki

- Tour by Tohoshinki
- Tour logo
- Location: Japan
- Associated album: With
- Start date: February 6, 2015
- End date: April 2, 2015
- No. of shows: 16
- Website: toho-jp.net/tour2015/

Tohoshinki concert chronology
- Tistory: Special Live Tour; (2014–15); With: Live Tour; (2015); Begin Again: Live Tour; (2017–18)

With: Live Tour (stylized as Tohoshinki LIVE TOUR 2015 ～WITH～), also known as the With Tour, was the eighth Japanese concert tour (twelfth overall) by South Korean pop duo Tohoshinki. It was launched in support of their eighth Japanese studio album With (2014), and coincided with Tohoshinki's tenth anniversary debut in Japan. The With Tour was the duo's second dome tour in Japan, their last one being 2013's Time Tour.

The tour was first announced by the duo in August 2014 at the A-Nation Stadium Festival concert in Tokyo. It kicked off at the Fukuoka Dome on February 6, 2015, and concluded in the Tokyo Dome on April 2, 2015. The tour drew in over 750,000 people from 16 shows. Their final show on April 2 was also streamed live in theaters, bringing the total amount of concertgoers to 825,000.

The With Tour was the duo's last headlining Japanese concert before taking their indefinite hiatus to enlist in South Korea's compulsory military service.

== Background ==
On August 30, 2014, during the A-Nation Stadium Festival concert, Tohoshinki announced that they would embark on their second Dome tour in early 2015 in support for their tenth anniversary debut in Japan. Following the duo's unveil, twelve dates for their tour were announced by their record label Avex Trax. On October 23, Avex announced the tour's supporting album With. Due to high demand, two additional dates were announced for the Fukuoka Dome and Kyocera Dome Osaka on November 1. On December 10, the official tour logo was revealed along with the announcement that two more dates were added in April for the Tokyo Dome, extending the With Tour to sixteen shows. The tour's official website and merchandise were launched on January 8, 2015.

== Recordings and broadcast ==
The final two shows at the Tokyo Dome on April 1–2 were filmed and released as a DVD and Blu-ray concert film on August 19, 2015, through Avex Trax in Japan. The DVD and Blu-ray were commercially successfully, debuting at number one on the Oricon chart. The DVD charted for sixteen weeks, while the Blu-ray charted for fourteen weeks. Five songs from the setlist were made available for download as a live EP, which was also released on August 19.

The tour's final show on April 2 in Tokyo was also streamed live in various cinemas across Japan. The show was broadcast as a television special on June 13, 2015, airing on Fuji Television. It featured exclusive behind-the-scenes footage and an interview where Tohoshinki reflect on their ten years since debut in Japan. The broadcast re-ran through 2016.

== Setlist ==
This setlist is representative of the first show in Fukuoka. It does not represent all dates throughout the tour.

1. "Refuse to Lose"
2. "Spinning"
3. "Why? (Keep Your Head Down)"
4. "Choosey Lover"
5. "Baby, Don't Cry"
6. "Believe in U"
7. "No?"
8. "Answer"
9. "DIRT"
10. "Survivor"
11. "Time Works Wonders"
12. "Special One"
13. "Before U Go" (Japanese version)
14. "Calling"
15. "Duet" / "Dōshite Kimi o Suki ni Natte Shimattandarō?" (どうして君を好きになってしまったんだろう)
16. "Chandelier"
17. "Humanoids" (Japanese version)
18. "Break Up the Shell"
19. "High Time"
20. "I Just Can't Quit Myself"
21. "Love In the Ice"
22. "MAXIMUM" (Japanese version)
23. "Rising Sun" (Japanese version)

First encore

24. "B.U.T (BE-AU-TY)"
25. "Sakuramichi" (サクラミチ, Cherry Blossom Road)
26. "With Love"

Second encore

27. "We Are!" (ウィーアー!)
28. "Somebody To Love"

== Tour dates ==
List of concerts, showing date, city, venue, and attendance
Date	City	Venue	Attendance
February 6, 2015	Fukuoka	Fukuoka Dome	120,000
February 7, 2015	Fukuoka	Fukuoka Dome	120,000
February 8, 2015	Fukuoka	Fukuoka Dome	120,000
February 14, 2015	Sapporo	Sapporo Dome	—N/a
February 20, 2015	Nagoya	Nagoya Dome	—N/a
February 21, 2015	Nagoya	Nagoya Dome	—N/a
February 22, 2015	Nagoya	Nagoya Dome	—N/a
February 25, 2015	Tokyo	Tokyo Dome	110,000
February 26, 2015	Tokyo	Tokyo Dome	110,000
March 14, 2015	Osaka	Kyocera Dome Osaka	—N/a
March 15, 2015	Osaka	Kyocera Dome Osaka	—N/a
March 17, 2015	Osaka	Kyocera Dome Osaka	—N/a
March 18, 2015	Osaka	Kyocera Dome Osaka	—N/a
March 19, 2015	Osaka	Kyocera Dome Osaka	—N/a
April 1, 2015	Tokyo	Tokyo Dome	110,000
April 2, 2015	Tokyo	Tokyo Dome	110,000
Total			750,000
