= Two of Us (TVXQ album) =

Remix album by Tohoshinki
- Released: October 5, 2016
- Recorded: 2011–2014
- Genre: J-pop; lounge; soul; rock
- Label: Avex Trax/SM Entertainment Japan

Tohoshinki chronology
| Rise as God (2015) | Two of Us (2016) | Fine Collection ~Begin Again~ (2017) |

Two of Us is the fourth Japanese remix album by South Korean pop act Tohoshinki, and their first remix album as a duo. It was released on October 5, 2016, by Avex Trax.

The album contains remixes of tracks from Tohoshinki's first four albums since becoming a duo—Tone (2011), Time (2013), Tree (2014), and With (2014). The music in the album is influenced by variations of 1950s to 1960s lounge music and soft rock, including surf music, bossa nova, Philly soul, and lovers rock.

Two of Us debuted at number two on the Oricon Albums Chart and Billboard Japan Top Albums Chart, selling 28,000 copies.

== Background ==
Two of Us was announced on August 19, 2016, by Avex Trax through Tohoshinki's official website. The album was created while both members of Tohoshinki were fulfilling their compulsory service in South Korea.

Rather than mixing the songs into dance or club tracks, Tohoshinki and their label opted for a more "colorful" approach to the remixes. The theme of the album focuses on relaxing sounds throughout the day, and incorporates serene beach remix styles such as lounge music. The cover of Two of Us features a colorful painting of Tohoshinki, which is based on a series of photos that Tohoshinki shot for their "Sweat / Answer" single in 2014.

On September 2, Avex Trax released short snippets of "Baby, don't cry" and "OCEAN".

== Track listing ==
| No. | Title | Lyrics | Music | Remix | Length |
|---|---|---|---|---|---|
| 1. | "Intro ~The Dawn Sky~" | | Tsukiko Nakamura | Shinjiroh Inoue | 1:38 |
| 2. | "Baby, don’t cry" (Two of Us ver.) | H.U.B. | Fredrik Jernberg; Erik Lidbom; Hide Nakamura | Goro Ito | 4:26 |
| 3. | "Believe In U" (Two of Us ver.) | Shinjiroh Inoue | Shinjiroh Inoue | KONCOS | 4:56 |
| 4. | "Sweat" (Two of Us ver.) | H.U.B. | Hanif Sabzevar; Kevin Borg; Nicklas Eklun | Mamoru S; Tsuyoshi Fujita | 4:05 |
| 5. | "Interlude ~This Dear Ocean~" | | Inoue | Inoue | 0:40 |
| 6. | "Aitakute Aitakute Tamaranai (逢いたくて逢いたくてたまらない)" (Really Want to See You) (Two of Us ver.) | Inoue | Inoue | Inoue | 5:13 |
| 7. | "One More Thing" (Two of Us ver.) | H.U.B. | her0ism | Gota Yashiki | 4:09 |
| 8. | "In Our Time" (Two of Us ver.) | Inoue | Inoue | Koichi from Sawagi | 6:01 |
| 9. | "OCEAN" (Two of Us ver.) | Inoue | Inoue | Mamoru S; Tsuyoshi Fujita | 5:05 |
| 10. | "Interlude ~Sinking Sun~" | | Inoue | Inoue | 0:55 |
| 11. | "Duet" (Two of Us ver.) | Inoue | Inoue | Yoichiro Kakizaki | 4:54 |
| 12. | "Interlude ~Blue Moment~" | | Inoue | Inoue | 0:52 |
| 13. | "One and Only One" (Two of Us ver.) | Inoue | Peter Kvint; Jonas Myrin | Eiichi Kogrey; George (MOP of HEAD) | 4:01 |
| 14. | "Time Works Wonders" (Two of Us ver.) | Inoue | Peter Gordeno; Jamie Hartman | Kakizaki | 4:28 |
| 15. | "Chandelier" (Two of Us ver.) | H.U.B. | Matthew Tishler; Andrew Underberg | Gakuji "CHABE" Matsuda | 4:36 |
| 16. | "Weep" (Two of Us ver.) | Inoue | solaya | Matsuda | 4:22 |
| 17. | "Outro ~Silence of The Night~" | | Tsukiko Nakamura | Inoue | 1:38 |
| Total length: | | | | | 1:01:59 |

== Credits and personnel ==
Credits for Two of Us, taken from the liner notes of the album.

- Tohoshinki – main vocals
- Shinjiroh Inoue – music, arrangement, programming, mixer, recorder, guitar
- Tsukiko Nakamura – vocals, music, guitar
- Goro Ito – remixer, classical guitar, programming
- Keita Ogawa – drums, percussion
- Masayasu Tzboguchi – Rhodes piano
- KONCOS – remixer
- Taichi Furukawa – piano, drums, synthesizers
- Hiroshi Sato – guitar
- Gakuji "MABE" Matsuda – technical advisor, remixer, triangle, conga
- Tsutomu Oikawa – mixer, recorder
- Mamoru S – mixer, programming, guitar
- Tsuyoshi Fujita – remixer, programming, electric guitar
- Atsushi Hattori – mixer
- Tadashi Iwamura – drums
- Taizo Nakamura – bass
- Gota Yashiki – remixer, programming, drums
- Dub Maxer X – mixer
- Mitsuhiro Tanigawa – recorder
- KOICHI from SAWAGI – remixer, piano
- Yoichiro Kakizaki – programmer, remixer, piano, guitar
- Kitaro Nakamura – bass
- Obawo Nakajima – percussion
- Kiyoto Konda – guitar
- Tatsuya Morokaji – mixer, recorder
- Eiichi Kogrey – remixer, drums, bass, recorder
- George (MOP of HEAD) – remixer, piano, synthesizers, mixer, recorder
- Mio Abe – violin
- Akico Maruyama – violin
- TSUTCHIE – mixer
- Mastered by Yuka Koizumi
- Illustrator: Hitoshi Kuroki
- Booklet liner notes: Takashi Inomata
- Art direction and design: Masaru Nakagawa

== Charts ==
=== Weekly charts ===
| Chart (2016) | Peak position |
|---|---|
| Japanese Albums (Oricon) | 2 |
| Billboard Japan Top Albums | 2 |

=== Sales ===
| Released | Oricon chart | Peak | Debut sales | Sales total |
|---|---|---|---|---|
| October 5, 2016 | Daily Albums Chart | 1 | 22,801 | 30,638 |
| October 5, 2016 | Weekly Albums Chart | 2 | 27,951 | 30,638 |
| October 5, 2016 | Monthly Albums Chart | 13 | 30,638 | 30,638 |
