= T (TVXQ album) =

Studio album by Tohoshinki
- Released: January 22, 2008
- Recorded: 2007
- Genres: J-pop; R&B; dance-pop; hip hop; electronic
- Length: 1:09:43
- Label: Rhythm Zone

Tohoshinki chronology
Five in the Black (2007)	T (2008)	Mirotic (2008)

Singles from T
- 1. "Lovin' You" Released: June 13, 2007; 2. "Summer (Summer Dream/Song for You/Love in the Ice)" Released: August 1, 2007; 3. "Shine/Ride On" Released: September 19, 2007; 4. "Forever Love" Released: November 14, 2007; 5. "Together" Released: December 19, 2007; 6. "Purple Line" Released: January 16, 2008

T is the third Japanese studio album (sixth overall) by South Korean pop group Tohoshinki, released on January 22, 2008, by Rhythm Zone. It at #4 on the Oricon weekly charts. The album's biggest competition in sales was with Zard's "Zard Request Best: Beautiful Memory", the last album after its lead vocalist Izumi Sakai's death in 2007.

According to the members, the "T" stands for several things, such as "Tohoshinki", "Title", "Third" album, "Top" and "Try". It could also stand for "Trick/Trust" and the group's "Teamwork". A week before the album's release, the single " Purple Line" had debuted and reached #1 in Oricon weekly sales.

The management played a different strategy to promote the album by splitting the members into teams which travelled separately to different cities in Japan for a week and appeared on radio shows and TV programs.

The song "Kiss したまま、さよなら" was specially composed and written by members Micky Yoochun and Hero Jaejoong, included only in 2CD+2DVD version. The song Trick is a song that is a mix of 5 songs (released after the album), each dedicated to a separate member. The first letter in the following five singles spell out the name 'Trick'.

== Music videos ==
Several songs in the album were singles previously released which had associated music videos, however not all are included in the DVD of the album. List of songs with PVs, in order of release:

- "Lovin' You"
- "Summer Dream"
- "Shine/Ride On"
- "Last Angel"
- "Forever Love"
- "Together"
- "Purple Line"

== Track listing ==
T track list
No.	Title	Lyrics	Music	Arrangement	Length
1.	"Trick"	H.U.B	Akira	Akira	4:27
2.	"No?"	H.U.B	Dane Deviller (Sean & Dave); Sean Hosein (Sean & Dave); Steve Smith (SA TrackWorks); Anthony Anderson (SA TrackWorks); Ibrahim Lakhani	Sean & Dave; SA TrackWorks; Ibrahim Lakhani	3:44
3.	"Purple Line"	Yoo Young-jin; Ryoji Sonoda	Yoo Young-jin; Yoo Han-jin; JJ650	Yoo Young-jin; Lee Soo-man	3:15
4.	"Forever Love"	Ryoji Sonoda	Ichiro Fujiya	Jin Nakamura	5:57
5.	"Summer Dream"	H.U.B	Kiyoko Hara (Tatta Works); Masayuki Fujii (Tatta Works)	H-Wonder	4:57
6.	"Ride on"	H.U.B	Christopher Lee-Joe (BNA Productions); Philipe-Marc Anquetil (BNA Productions); Iain James	BNA Productions	3:28
7.	"Darkness Eyes"	Ryoji Sonoda	Tommy Henriksen	Tommy Henriksen	3:46
8.	"Lovin' You"	H.U.B	Mikio Sakai	Mikio Sakai	5:52
9.	"Rainbow"	H.U.B	Niv Davidovich; Chico Nadal; Darrell Pitmann	Niv Davidovich	3:35
10.	"Shine"	H.U.B	Nishikawa Reo	Akira	4:32
11.	"Last Angel" (TVXQ version)	Koda Kumi; H.U.B	Negin Djafari; Ian-Paolo Lira; Hugo Lira; Thomas G:son	Negin Djafari; Ian-Paolo Lira; Hugo Lira; Thomas G:son	3:46
12.	"Clap!"	H.U.B	Fredrik "Figge" Boström	Fredrik "Figge" Boström	3:15
13.	"Love in the Ice"	Ryoji Sonoda	Daisuke Suzuki	Daisuke Suzuki; Yuya Saito	5:27
14.	"Forever Love" (Acappella version)	Ryoji Sonoda	Ichiro Fujiya	Shinichiro Murayama	2:57
15.	"Lovin' You" (Haru's "Deep Water" Mix)	H.U.B	Mikio Sakai	Hitoshi Harukawa	5:24
16.	"Together" (Bonus track)	H.U.B	Hiroaki Hara	Akira	5:21
Total length:					69:43

Notes

- CD + DVD and 2 CD + 2 DVD versions do not include tracks 14 & 15 ("Forever Love (Acappella version)" & "Lovin' You (Haru's "Deep Water" Mix)")

T 2 CD + 2 DVD Version CD 2 track list
No.	Title	Lyrics	Music	Arrangement	Length
1.	"Song for You"	H.U.B	Kazuhiro Hara	Nishikawa Reo	4:31
2.	"Day Moon 〜ハルダル〜" (Japanese version)	Kim Jeong-bae; H.U.B	Kenzie	Kenzie; Shim Sang-won	3:57
3.	"Beautiful Life" (Japanese version)	Young-hu Kim; Ryoji Sonoda	Jamie Jones (The Heavyweights); Jack Kugell (The Heavyweights); Jason Pennock (The Heavyweights); Sarah Nagourney	The Heavyweights	3:40
4.	"You're My Miracle" (Japanese version)	Young-hu Kim; H.U.B	Young-hu Kim	Young-hu Kim	4:06
5.	"Kiss (したまま、さよなら)"	Yoochun	Yoochun; Jaejoong	Yoochun; Crusher Kimura	6:19
Total length:					22:33

T CD + DVD Version DVD
No.	Title	Length
1.	"Lovin' You PV"
2.	"Summer Dream PV"
3.	"Shine PV"
4.	"Forever Love PV"
5.	"Together PV"
6.	"Offshoot Movie" (Only included in First Press Release)

T 2 CD + 2 DVD Version DVD 1
No.	Title	Length
1.	"Lovin' You PV"
2.	"Summer Dream PV"
3.	"Shine PV"
4.	"Forever Love PV"
5.	"Together PV"

T 2 CD + 2 DVD Version DVD 2
No.	Title	Length
1.	"Soul Power Tokyo Summit 2007: Tohoshinki"
2.	"2nd Live Tour: Five in the Black Special Edition"
3.	"Premium Mini Live @Yokohama Blitz 2007.9.23"

== Charts ==
=== Weekly charts ===
Chart (2008)	Peak position
Japanese Albums (Oricon)	4

=== Monthly charts ===
Chart (2008)	Peak position
Japanese Albums (Oricon)	30
South Korean Int'l Albums (MIAK)	1

== Sales and certifications ==
Region	Certification	Certified units/sales
Japan (RIAJ)	Gold	158,524
South Korea	—	29,161

=== Singles ===
Date	Title	Chart position
2007-06-13	"Lovin' You"	2
2007-08-01	"Summer: Summer Dream/Song for You/Love in the Ice"	2
2007-09-19	"Shine/Ride On"	2
2007-11-14	"Forever Love"	4
2007-12-09	"Together"	3
2008-01-16	"Purple Line"	1

== Release history ==
Country	Date	Label
Japan	January 22, 2008	Rhythm Zone
Hong Kong	January 30, 2008	Avex Asia
South Korea	January 30, 2008	SM Entertainment
China	February 2008	Polydor China
