= Manazashi =

Single by Tohoshinki
- B-side: "Your Song"
- Released: January 22, 2020
- Recorded: 2019
- Genre: J-pop
- Length: 4:06
- Label: Avex Trax
- Songwriter: Tsukiko Nakamura

Tohoshinki singles chronology
"Hot Hot Hot / Mirrors" (2019)	"Manazashi" (2020)	"Small Talk" (2020)

Music video
- "Manazashi" on YouTube

"Manazashi" (まなざし; "Gaze") is the 48th Japanese single by South Korean pop duo Tohoshinki, released by Avex Trax on January 22, 2020. Promoted as Tohoshinki's fifteenth anniversary single, it was released in three physical versions – a standard CD only version, a limited photobook edition, and a fanclub edition released exclusively for Tohoshinki's Japanese fan club, Bigeast. It is a "winter ballad" which highlights the duo's vocals, with some influences drawn from blues.

"Manazashi" debuted at number three on the Oricon Singles Chart their lowest debut on the charts since "Survivor" (2009). It peaked at number six on the Billboard Japan Hot 100.

== Background and promotion ==
"Manazashi" was announced on December 12, 2019, while Tohoshinki were in the midst of their nation-wide five-dome tour, the XV Tour. The album jackets and the single's B-side track "Your Song" were revealed on December 23, and a preview of the single on YouTube was released on December 24. "Manazashi" was promoted as Tohoshinki's 15th debut anniversary single in Japan.

The single's accompanying music video was released on YouTube on January 16, 2020, and a lyric video was released on January 18. The TV commercial dropped on January 20. The digital single and CD single were officially released online and nation-wide on January 22.

"Manazashi" was written by Tsukiko Nakamura, who first collaborated with Tohoshinki on their remix album Two of Us (2016), and had written songs for their albums Tomorrow (2018) and XV (2019). Nakamura wrote the song after attending one of Tohoshinki's concerts. Inspired by the duo, the lyrics of "Manazashi" are about staying grounded and humble even in the most extraordinary of circumstances. "Manazashi" and the B-side track "Your Song" are both ballads that highlight Tohoshinki's vocals, backed by orchestral instrumentals.

Tohoshinki were scheduled to promote "Manazashi" for the first time at their fifteenth anniversary event for April 2020, but performances were canceled due to the COVID-19 pandemic.

== Formats and track listings ==
- Digital download and streaming
1. "Manazashi" (まなざし; Gaze) – 4:06
2. "Your Song" – 4:42
3. "Manazashi" (less vocal) – 4:06
4. "Your Song" (less vocal) – 4:41

CD single (AVCK-79657, AVCK-79658, AVC1-79659)

1. "Manazashi"
2. "Your Song"
3. "Manazashi" (less vocal)
4. "Your Song" (less vocal)

== Charts ==
Chart performance for "Manazashi"
Chart (2020)	Peak position
Japan (Oricon)	3
Japan (Japan Hot 100)	6

== Sales ==
Sales for "Manazashi"
Release date	Oricon chart	Peak	Debut sales
January 22, 2020	Weekly Singles Chart	3	62,843
January 22, 2020	Monthly Singles Chart (January)	7	65,162
January 22, 2020	Yearly Singles Chart (2020)	55	66,933

== Release history ==
Release history and formats for "Manazashi"
Region	Date	Format	Label
Various	January 22, 2020	Digital download	Avex Entertainment
Japan	January 22, 2020	CD; digital download	Avex Trax
South Korea	January 23, 2020	Digital download	S.M. Entertainment
Taiwan	February 12, 2020	Digital download	Avex Taiwan
Taiwan	February 21, 2020	CD	Avex Taiwan
