= Sakuramichi =

Single by Tohoshinki
- B-side: "Kimi no Inai Yoru"
- Released: February 11, 2015 (release history)
- Recorded: 2014
- Genre: J-pop
- Length: 5:29
- Label: Avex Trax
- Songwriter: Katsuhiko Yamamoto
- Producer: Katsuhiko Yamamoto

Tohoshinki singles chronology
"Time Works Wonders" (2014)	"Sakuramichi" (2015)	"Reboot" (2017)

Music video
- "Sakuramichi" (Short ver.) on YouTube

"Sakuramichi" (サクラミチ; Cherry Blossom Road) is the 43rd Japanese single by South Korean pop duo Tohoshinki, released by Avex Trax. It was made available in three physical versions – a CD+DVD version, a CD only version, and a fan club edition exclusively for Tohoshinki's Japanese fan club, Bigeast. "Sakuramichi" was first made available for download in Japan on February 11, 2015, followed by the official physical release on February 25, 2015. Calling it their graduation song, "Sakuramichi" was promoted as Tohoshinki's tenth debut anniversary single in Japan. Written and produced by Katsuhiko Yamamoto, the lyrics of "Sakuramichi" are about facing new life adventures with optimism.

"Sakuramichi" was commercially successful, peaking at number two on the Oricon Singles Chart and Billboard Japan Hot 100 with over 136,000 copies sold on the first week of release. It was certified gold by the Recording Industry Association of Japan (RIAJ) for shipments of over 100,000.

== Release and promotion ==
"Sakuramichi" was first revealed by Smart TV on December 8, 2014, stating that Tohoshinki would perform the theme song for the fourth series of the Japanese television drama, Hanayome Noren (花嫁のれん). On December 23, Avex officially posted pre-order notices of the single on Tohoshinki's official website. A one-minute preview of "Sakuramichi" was played during the opening credits for Hanayome Noren, which premiered on Tokai TV on January 5, 2015.

On January 25, Avex revealed the official artwork for "Sakuramichi", which included three different covers. The first artwork shows Tohoshinki posing in front of a cherry blossom tree, while the second artwork has Tohoshinki sitting inside a train cabin. Both sets appeared in the song's official promotional video (PV), which was first unveiled on January 30. The last cover shows Tohoshinki wearing similar sweaters that carry the number "10", representing the duo's tenth year. An official preview for the PV of "Sakuramichi" aired on television on January 30, including snippets of Tohoshinki working behind-the-scenes. A day later, the short version of "Sakuramichi" was posted on GYAO!, a video-sharing website on Yahoo! Japan. On February 3, Avex uploaded the PV to YouTube and launched a special website for "Sakuramichi" the following day.

On February 11, "Sakuramichi" and the B-side track "Kimi no Inai Yoru" were made available for download in many Asian countries on the iTunes Store and Recochoku, two weeks before its official physical release. "Kimi no Inai Yoru" (君のいない夜) was later made into the ending theme song for the Japanese variety show King's Brunch for the February to March 2015 season.

== Commercial performance ==
"Sakuramichi" debuted at number two on Japan's Tower Records and number two on the daily Oricon Singles Chart, behind Arashi's "Sakura" on both charts. Selling 95,879 copies at debut, "Sakuramichi" was the duo's first single since 2012's "Android" to sell over 95,000 copies on the first day of release. By the end of the week, it sold over 136,000 physical copies, entering the weekly Oricon Singles Chart at number two.

"Sakuramichi" entered the Billboard Japan Hot 100 at number 20 on the first week, and jumped to number two on the third week. On the Billboard Japan Hot 100 Airplay, it debuted at number 33 and went up to number one on the third week, making it the duo's first song to top the airplay chart. It then debuted at number 40 on the Billboard Japan Adult Contemporary Airplay and peaked at number 4 on the third week.

== Live performances ==
Tohoshinki gave their first live performance of "Sakuramichi" on February 6 at the Fukuoka Dome, the first stop of their 2015 With Tour. It was performed during the concert's first encore segment. Tohoshinki continued to promote "Sakuramichi" throughout the duration of their tour and on television; the duo gave their first televised performance of "Sakuramichi" on February 24 for Sukkiri. On April 3, Tohoshinki performed "Sakuramichi" on TV Asahi's Music Station, their first appearance on the show in over two years.

== Formats and track listings ==
- Digital download single
1. "Sakuramichi" (サクラミチ; Cherry Blossom Road) – 5:29
2. "Kimi no Inai Yoru" (君のいない夜; Night Without You) – 5:36

CD+DVD single AVCK-79243/B
Disc 1 (CD)

1. "Sakuramichi"
2. "Kimi no Inai Yoru"
3. "Sakuramichi -Less Vocal-"
4. "Kimi no Inai Yoru -Less Vocal-"

Disc 2 (DVD)

1. "Sakuramichi" (Video Clip)
2. "Sakuramichi" (Video Clip Off Shot Movie) (First Press only)

CD single AVCK-79244

1. "Sakuramichi"
2. "Kimi no Inai Yoru"
3. "Sakuramichi -Drifting into 80's Remix-"
4. "Sakuramichi -Less Vocal-"
5. "Kimi no Inai Yoru -Less Vocal-"
6. CD-EXTRA: Jacket Making Movie

CD single (Bigeast limited edition) AVC1-79246

1. "Sakuramichi"
2. "Kimi no Inai Yoru"
3. "Sakuramichi -Less Vocal-"
4. "Kimi no Inai Yoru -Less Vocal-"

== Charts ==
Chart (2014)	Peak position
Japan (Oricon Singles Chart)	2
Billboard Japan Hot 100	2
Billboard Japan Hot 100 Airplay	1
Billboard Japan Hot Single Sales	2
Billboard Japan Adult Contemporary Airplay	4

=== Sales ===
Released	Oricon chart	Peak	Debut sales	Sales total	Chart run
February 25, 2015	Daily Singles Chart	2	95,879	158,131	11 weeks
February 25, 2015	Weekly Singles Chart	2	136,466	158,131	11 weeks
February 25, 2015	Monthly Singles Chart	3	136,466	158,131	11 weeks
February 25, 2015	Yearly Singles Chart	42	158,131	158,131	11 weeks

== Certifications ==
Region	Certification	Certified units/sales
Japan (RIAJ)	Gold	100,000^{^}
^{^} Shipments figures based on certification alone.

== Release history ==
Region	Date	Format	Label
Worldwide (except United States)	February 11, 2015	Digital download on iTunes Store	Avex Music Creative
Japan	February 25, 2015	CD; CD+DVD	Avex Trax
South Korea	February 25, 2015	Digital download	S.M. Entertainment
Taiwan	March 20, 2015	CD; CD+DVD	Avex Taiwan
