= Hot Hot Hot / Mirrors =

Single by Tohoshinki

from the album XV
- Released: July 31, 2019 (release history)
- Studio: 2019
- Genre: J-pop; dance
- Length: 3:40 ("Hot Hot Hot"); 4:07 ("Mirrors")
- Label: Avex Trax
- Songwriters: Nicolas Scapa; Michael John Dewey Hancock; John Read Fasse; Kelly ("Hot Hot Hot"); Hi-yunk; Tsukiko Nakamura ("Mirrors")

Tohoshinki singles chronology
"Truth" (2018)	"Hot Hot Hot / Mirrors" (2019)	"Manazashi" (2020)

Music video
- "Hot Hot Hot" on YouTube

Music video
- "Mirrors" x Sign on YouTube

"Hot Hot Hot" / "Mirrors" is the 47th Japanese single by South Korean pop duo Tohoshinki, released on July 31, 2019, by Avex Trax as a single for Tohoshinki's tenth studio album XV (2019). It is a double A-sided single featuring "Hot Hot Hot", a summer-themed pop song; and "Mirrors," a theme song for the 2019 Japanese television drama Sign (サイン―法医学者 柚木貴志の事件).

"Hot Hot Hot" was written by Nicolas Scapa, Michael Hancock, and John Fasses, with lyrics by Kelly. "Mirrors" (ミラーズ) was written by Hi-yunk with lyrics by Tsukiko Nakamura. The accompanying music video for "Hot Hot Hot" was released on July 19, 2019, on YouTube. A one-minute and 29 second special movie for "Mirrors" was uploaded to YouTube on August 23, 2019. Tohoshinki debuted their performance of "Hot Hot Hot" on June 24, 2019, for the FNS Music Festival, where they also performed "Why (Keep Your Head Down)."

The single debuted at number two on the Oricon Singles Chart.

== Background and release ==
"Hot Hot Hot" and "Mirrors" were announced to be double A-sided singles in early June 2019. Written by Nicolas Scapa, Michael Hancock, John Fasses and Kelly, "Hot Hot Hot" was described to be a fun, summer-loving dance track. "Mirrors" was written by Hi-yunk with lyrics by Tsukiko Nakamura. It was announced to be the theme song of the Japanese television drama Sign—remake of the 2011 South Korean television series of the same name—on June 18. Sign premiered on TV Asahi on July 11, 2019.

On July 1, Tohoshinki revealed album covers for the single, which was announced to be released in three versions: a standard CD single, a limited edition single with a 24-page photobook, and an exclusive version for Tohoshinki's fanclub, Bigeast. The music video for "Hot Hot Hot" premiered on July 19, 2019, one week before the single's official release on July 31, 2019.

== Commercial performance ==
"Hot Hot Hot" entered the Billboard Japan Hot 100 at number 56. It rose to number four on its second week, while "Mirrors" peaked at number 46. "Hot Hot Hot" entered the Billboard Japan Download Songs chart at number 33, while "Mirrors" entered the chart at number 53. The single debuted at number three on the Billboard Top Single Sales. "Hot Hot Hot" entered the CDTV's Countdown Weekly chart at number three.

According to the Oricon, "Hot Hot Hot / Mirrors" debuted at number two on the Oricon Singles Chart, selling 59,230 physical copies on its first week. It is Tohoshinki's lowest-selling single since "Purple Line" in 2008.

== Live performances ==
Tohoshinki debuted their performance of "Hot Hot Hot" at the FNS Music Festival on July 24, 2019. They performed "Hot Hot Hot" a second time for the A-Nation Music Festival on August 18, 2019, in Osaka.

== Formats and track listings ==
- Digital download EP
1. "Hot Hot Hot" – 3:40
2. "Mirrors" (ミラーズ) – 4:07
3. "Hot Hot Hot" (Less Vocal) – 3:40
4. "Mirrors" (ミラーズ) (Less Vocal) – 4:07

CD single AVCK-79608 (Limited), AVCK-79609, AVC1-79610 (Bigeast)

1. "Hot Hot Hot" – 3:40
2. "Mirrors" (ミラーズ) – 4:07
3. "Hot Hot Hot" (Less Vocal) – 3:40
4. "Mirrors" (ミラーズ) (Less Vocal) – 4:07

== Charts ==
Chart (2019)	Peak position
Japan (Oricon Singles Chart)	2
Billboard Japan Hot 100	4
Billboard Top Single Sales	3
Billboard Japan Download Songs	33

=== Sales ===
Released	Oricon chart	Peak	Debut sales	Sales total
July 31, 2019	Daily Singles Chart	2	—N/a	64,878
July 31, 2019	Weekly Singles Chart	2	59,230	64,878
July 31, 2019	Monthly Singles Chart (July)	10	64,878	64,878

== Release history ==
Region	Date	Format	Label
Worldwide	July 31, 2019	Digital download on iTunes Store	Avex Entertainment
Japan	July 31, 2019	CD; digital download	Avex Trax
South Korea	August 19, 2019	Digital download	S.M. Entertainment
Taiwan	August 21, 2019	Digital download	Avex Taiwan
