= Winter (Winter Rose / Duet) =

Single by Tohoshinki

from the album Time
- B-side: "Duet" (Reversible version); "Duet" (Member version)
- Released: November 30, 2011
- Recorded: 2011
- Genre: J-pop
- Length: 4:46
- Label: Avex Trax

Tohoshinki singles chronology
"Superstar" (2011)	"Winter" (2011)	"Still" (2012)

"Winter: Winter Rose / Duet -winter ver.-" is a single released by South Korean duo Tohoshinki. The single features the songs "Winter Rose" as well as the re-cut single "Duet" from the Tone album, although remixed to have a holiday feel to it.

== Background ==
"Winter Rose" was featured in a Seven-net Shopping Commercial. The single was also released in South Korea.

== Music video ==
A music video for "Winter Rose" was shot, but was not included with the CD+DVD version of the single.

== Chart performance ==
The single was released November 30, 2011, and sold 76,615 units on its first day of release. It peaked at #2 on both the daily chart the weekly chart on the Oricon chart. The single sold over 153,177 copies.

== Track list ==
No.	Title	Length
1.	"Winter Rose"	4:46
2.	"Duet (Winter version)"	5:36
3.	"Winter Rose (Reversible version)"	4:46
4.	"Winter Rose (Less vocal)"	4:46
5.	"Duet (Winter version) (Less vocal)"	5:36
6.	"Duet (Winter version) (Member chorus version)"

DVD
No.	Title	Length
1.	"Duet (Video Clip)"
2.	"Duet (Video Clip) (Member version)"
3.	"Off Shot Movie"

== Charts ==
Chart (2011)	Peak position
Japan Oricon Daily Singles Chart	2
Japan Oricon Weekly Singles Chart	2
Japan Oricon Monthly Singles Chart	4
Japan Oricon Yearly Singles Chart	54

== Sales and certifications ==
Country	Provider	Sales	Certification
Japan	RIAJ	153,177+	Gold

== Release history ==
Country	Date	Label
Japan	November 30, 2011	Avex Trax
South Korea	December 23, 2011	SM Entertainment
Hong Kong	January 4, 2012	Avex Asia Limited
