= With (album) =

Studio album by Tohoshinki
- Released: December 17, 2014
- Recorded: 2013–14
- Genres: J-pop; dance-pop
- Length: 55:15
- Language: Japanese
- Label: Avex Trax
- Producers: Max Matsuura (exec.); Lee Soo-man (exec.); Nam So-young (gen.); Ryuhei Chiba (gen.); BNA Productions; Lubo Slavicek; TAKAROT; Yoo Young-jin; Peter Gordeno; Chris Wahle; Andreas Öhrn; James Winchester; Matthew Tishler; Andrew Underberg; Fredrik Jernberg; UTA; Nicklas Eklund; Caesar & Loui; Olof Lindskog

Tohoshinki chronology
Live World Tour: Catch Me in Seoul (2014)	With (2014)	Rise as God (2015)

Singles from With
- 1. "Sweat / Answer" Released: June 11, 2014; 2. "Time Works Wonders" Released: November 5, 2014; 3. "Chandelier" Released: December 17, 2024; 4. "Spinning" Released: December 17, 2024

With (stylized in all caps) is the eighth Japanese studio album (fifteenth overall) by South Korean pop duo Tohoshinki, released by Avex Trax on December 17, 2014. The record was released in four physical versions – Version A, a CD+DVD version with music videos and live performances; Version B, another CD+DVD version with off-shot movies; Version C, a CD only version with two bonus tracks; and Version D, a fan club limited edition with a CD-Extra. Recording and writing for the album roughly began in the summer of 2013. With is described to be an album composed of nostalgic dance-pop songs that are influenced by disco and jazz, accompanied by marching drumbeats. Its lyrical content explores the general concept of love and friendship.

With was a commercial success, debuting at number one on the Billboard Japan Top Albums Chart and the Oricon Albums Chart, selling 233,000 copies on the first week of release. In doing so, Tohoshinki became the first foreign artists in Japan to top the Oricon Albums Chart four times in a row. Tohoshinki are also the first foreign artists in Japan to have four consecutive albums sell 200,000 or more copies in a week. With the addition of With, Tohoshinki became the third international music act, after Simon & Garfunkel and Bon Jovi, to have released five number one albums in Japan. By the end of the year, With earned a platinum certification by the Recording Industry Association of Japan (RIAJ) for shipments of over 250,000 copies.

The album has two commercially successful singles – "Sweat / Answer" and "Time Works Wonders" – both which debuted at number two on the Oricon Singles Chart and achieved Gold certifications by the Recording Industry Association of Japan (RIAJ). To promote the album, Tohoshinki will embark on their second nationwide five-Dome tour, the With: Live Tour 2015, from February to March 2015.

== Production and composition ==
With consists mostly of dance-pop songs and ballads. In an interview for B-Pass magazine, Tohoshinki described With as an enduring and long-lasting album, with songs that can pass through time without seeming outdated. Unlike the electropop influences heard in their last few records, the dance-pop songs recorded in With adopted more retro sounds from disco, jazz, and soul. The laid-back feel of the album puts With as a significant musical departure from Tohoshinki's earlier works, which were described as "intense and aggressive dance music" by the duo. The album's title represents Tohoshinki's wishes to stay together and form a closer connection with their fans.

The opening track "Refuse to Lose" introduces Tohoshinki as the "kings" of pop with an aggressive message of self-empowerment. It is a midtempo pop song with chanting, tuneful rapping and a pulsating brass arrangement. The second track "Spinning", one of the album's pre-release singles, follows "Refuse to Lose"'s brass sound and is an uptempo dance-pop song with disco and soul influences. Heavy marching percussions and horns are looped throughout the track, resembling Tohoshinki's previous single "Something", a swing jazz number with big band instrumentals. Similarly, the album's fourth track "Surisuri (Spellbound)", the Japanese version of Tohoshinki's Korean single "Spellbound"; and the twelfth track "Sweat", the first single off With, are also uptempo jazz pop numbers.

The fifth track "Time Works Wonders", the second and final single from With; and the bonus track "Christmas is Love", are adult contemporary soul ballads. The sixth track "Dirt" is a gritty acoustic pop song with a catchy hook, and the tenth track "Answer" is a midtempo electropop song. Light disco-pop songs "I Just Can't Quit Myself" and "Special One" have humorous lyrics while the pop ballads "Believe in U" and "Baby, Don't Cry" have encouraging lyrics. The pre-release single "Chandelier" and the album's last track "With Love", a slow tempo march, are ballads with melancholic but heartwarming messages.

== Singles ==
The duo debuted their first single off the record, "Sweat" at the first show of their Tree: Live Tour 2014 in April 2014. The single, which was released as a double A-side single with "Answer", was released on June 11. It debuted at number two on the Oricon Singles Chart and sold over 140,000 copies, The album's second single, the soul ballad "Time Works Wonders", was announced in August and released on November 5. The single debuted at number two on the Oricon and sold 107,000 copies the first week. Having shipped over 100,000 copies to retail stores, both singles were certified Gold by the RIAJ.

== Release and promotion ==
On August 30, 2014, Tohoshinki announced at Avex's a-nation music festival that they would hold their second five-Dome concert tour in early 2015, raising speculation that the duo would release a new studio album in the next few months. With was officially announced on October 23 via Tohoshinki's official website, with December 17, 2014 as the album's official release date. On November 4, Avex released the names of two pop ballad tracks from the album, "Believe in U" and "Chandelier." Both were announced to be used as ending songs for two Japanese variety programs.

The tracklist and the four official covers for With were unveiled on November 17 on Tohoshinki's official website. The cover of Version A, a CD+DVD version with music videos and live performances, features Tohoshinki posing with two taxidermied wolves inside an abandoned house overgrown with plants. Version B, a CD+DVD version with off-shot movies, has the duo smartly dressed in green suits and surrounded by disco balls, sitting against a neon background. Version C, a CD-only version with two bonus tracks, is a shot of the duo sitting on a bench. Version D, a limited edition exclusive for registered members of Tohoshinki's Japanese fanclub Bigeast, is a simple cover of Tohoshinki dressed in wool sweaters, with Yunho raising his right arm in the air and Changmin with his arms crossed. First press limited editions also came with a collectible photo card.

The PV for "Chandelier" was released on the Yahoo! Japan video streaming site, GyaO!, on November 20, and was ranked number one for three days. On November 25, Avex opened the album's special website, where it revealed forty-second snippets of all fourteen tracks from the record. A preview of the PV for "Spinning" was released on November 28. The album was promoted extensively at the DiverCity Tokyo Plaza shopping center in Odaiba. To commemorate the launch of With, the duo collaborated with the cruise ship Hotaluna for an exclusive Tohoshinki-themed cruise. The cruise had an exclusive one-day trip around Tokyo Bay on December 16.

== Commercial performance ==
According to statistics compiled by Japan's Oricon, With topped the daily Oricon Albums Chart on its first day of release, selling 162,790 copies. With stayed on top of the daily Oricon Albums Chart for the next six days, and the album ultimately sold 233,000 copies in its opening week, debuting atop the Billboard Japan Top Albums Chart and the weekly Oricon Albums Chart. With is the duo's fourth consecutive studio album and fifth overall record to sell over 200,000 copies on its first week of release, breaking their own sales record. With was also the duo's fourth consecutive album to debut at number one on the Oricon, making Tohoshinki the first foreign music act in Japan to top the weekly Oricon Albums Chart four times in a row.

== Track listing ==
With track list
No.	Title	Lyrics	Music	Arrangement	Length
1.	"Refuse to Lose -Introduction-"	H.U.B	Philippe-Marc Anquetil (BNA Productions); Christopher Lee-Joe (BNA Productions); Danny Lattouf; Martin Scott Carre	Yoshinari Takegami	2:40
2.	"Spinning"	H.U.B	Lubo Slavicek; Katerina Bramley; Ninos Hanna	Yoshinari Takegami	3:59
3.	"Believe in U"	Shinjiroh Inoue (Lambsey)	Shinjiroh Inoue (Lambsey)	Shinjiroh Inoue (Lambsey)	4:39
4.	"Surisuri (Spellbound)" (Japanese version)	Yoo Young-jin; H.U.B	Yoo Young-jin	Yoo Young-jin	4:31
5.	"Time Works Wonders"	Shinjiroh Inoue (Lambsey)	Peter Gordeno; Jamie Hartman	Yoshinari Takegami	3:52
6.	"Dirt"	H.U.B	Chris Wahle; Andreas Öhrn	Chris Wahle; Andreas Öhrn	2:45
7.	"I Just Can't Quit Myself"	Shinjiroh Inoue (Lambsey)	Simon Westbrook; Jamie Sellers; James Winchester	James Winchester	3:32
8.	"Chandelier"	H.U.B	Matthew Tishler; Andrew "Wonderberg" Underberg	Matthew Tishler; Andrew "Wonderberg" Underberg	4:12
9.	"Baby, Don't Cry"	H.U.B	Fredrik "Franciz" Jernberg; Erik Lidbom; Hide Nakamura	Fredrik "Franciz" Jernberg	3:43
10.	"Answer"	H.U.B	Uta Watanabe (HUM); Hiro (HUM); Sunny Boy	Uta Watanabe	3:47
11.	"Calling"	Shinjiroh Inoue (Lambsey)	Takashi Iioka	Shinjiroh Inoue (Lambsey)	4:23
12.	"Sweat"	H.U.B	Hanif Sabzevari (Hitmanic); Kevin Borg; Nicklas Eklund	Nicklas Eklund	3:33
13.	"Special One"	H.U.B	Andreas Öberg; Daniel Caesar (Caesar & Loui); Ludwig Lindell (Caesar & Loui); Ollipop (The Kennel)	The Kennel	3:43
14.	"With Love"	Shinjiroh Inoue (Lambsey)	Shinjiroh Inoue (Lambsey)	Shinjiroh Inoue (Lambsey)	5:56
Total length:					55:15

With Version C track list – CD bonus tracks
No.	Title	Lyrics	Music	Arrangement	Length
15.	"Christmas is Loving"	H.U.B	Jordan Baum (The 87s); Michael McNamara (The 87s)	The 87s	2:11
16.	"Refuse to Lose"	H.U.B	Philippe-Marc Anquetil (BNA Productions); Christopher Lee-Joe (BNA Productions); Danny Lattouf; Martin Scott Carre	Yoshinari Takegami	3:09
Total length:					60:35

Version D (Bigeast limited edition) – CD extra
No.	Title	Length
15.	"CD-Extra: Time Works Wonders" (One cut version)

Notes

- Version D is only available on the Bigeast Official Shop, which requires Bigeast membership.

Version A – Disc 2 (DVD)
No.	Title	Length
1.	"Sweat" (Video clip)
2.	"Time Works Wonders" (Video clip)
3.	"Spinning" (Video clip)
4.	"Chandelier" (Video clip)
5.	"Sweat" (Dance version)
6.	"Time Works Wonders" (Sand art version)
7.	"Suri Suri (Spellbound)" (Live at A-nation 2014 Stadium Festival)
8.	"Scream" (Live at A-nation 2014 Stadium Festival)
9.	"I Love You" (Live at A-nation 2014 Stadium Festival)
10.	"Something" (Live at A-nation 2014 Stadium Festival)
11.	"Sweat" (Live at A-nation 2014 Stadium Festival)
12.	"Summer Dream" (Live at A-nation 2014 Stadium Festival)
13.	"Ocean" (Live at A-nation 2014 Stadium Festival)

Version B – Disc 2 (DVD)
No.	Title	Length
1.	"Spinning" (Off shot movie)
2.	"Chandelier" (Off shot movie)
3.	"Album jacket shooting" (Off shot movie)
4.	"I Love You" (Live Tour 2014 "Tree" documentary film)
5.	"A-nation 2014 Stadium Festival backstage movie"

== Personnel ==
Credits adapted from the liner notes of With.

Performers and musicians

- Tohoshinki (Yunho, Changmin) – vocals, background vocals
- Philippe-Mare Anquetil – English voice-over (tracks 1, 16)
- Team-T – background vocals (track 1, 16)
- Yoo Young-jin – background vocals (track 4)
- Hiroaki Takeuchi – background vocals (track 13)
- Masamori Suzuki – trumpet (tracks 1, 2, 5, 16)
- Hiroki Sato – trombone (tracks 1, 5, 16)
- Yoshinari Takegami – saxophone (tracks 1, 2, 5, 16)
- Teppei Kawakami – trumpet (track 2)
- Kanade Shishiuchi – trombone (track 2)
- Shinjiroh Inoue – piano (track 3)
- Yoichi Murata – trombone (track 3)
- Kang Soo-ho – drums (track 4)
- Lee Tae-yoon – bass (track 4)
- Sam Lee – guitar (track 4)
- Song Gwang-sik – keyboards (track 4)
- Kim Dong-ha – trumpet, brass arrangement (track 4)
- Lee Han-jin – trombone (track 4)
- Zang Hyo-seok – saxophone (track 4)
- Kim Sang-il – saxophone (track 4)
- Kiyoto Konda – guitar (track 6)
- Daisuke Kadowaki Strings – strings (track 9)
- Shinjiroh Inoue – guitar, programming (tracks 10, 11)
- Udai Shika Strings – strings (track 11)
- Andreas Oberg – guitar (track 13)
- Futoshi Kobayashi – trumpet (track 13)
- Yuji Shimoda – trombone (track 13)
- Kazuhiro Murase – saxophone (track 13)

Technical personnel

- Katsutoshi Yasuhara – direction (tracks 1–3, 5–16)
- Atsushi Hattori – recording, mixing (tracks 1–3, 5–11, 13, 14, 16)
- Hideaki Jinbu – recording, mixing (tracks 3, 5, 6, 8–12)
- Yoo Young-jin – direction, recording, mixing (track 4)
- Takeshi Takizawa – recording (tracks 3, 14)
- Oh Sung-gun with assistant Song Ju-yong – recording (track 4)
- Kwak Jung-shin with assistant Jeong Mo-yun – recording (track 4)
- Junichi Shinohara – recording (tracks 7, 13, 14)
- Naoiki Yamada – mixing (tracks 2, 3, 7, 10–13)

== Charts ==
=== Weekly charts ===
Chart (2014, 2015)	Peak position
Japanese Albums (Oricon)ERROR in "Oricon": Invalid date format. Expected: YYYY-MM-DD.	1
Billboard Japan Top Albums	1
South Korean Albums Chart (Gaon)	7
South Korean International Albums Chart (Gaon)	1
Taiwanese East Asian Albums Chart (G-Music)	7

=== Sales ===
Released	Oricon chart	Peak	Debut sales	Sales total	Chart run
December 17, 2014	Daily Albums Chart	1	162,790	266,824	18 weeks
December 17, 2014	Weekly Albums Chart	1	233,216	266,824	18 weeks
December 17, 2014	Monthly Albums Chart	1	244,116	266,824	18 weeks
December 17, 2014	Yearly Albums Chart	15	266,824	266,824	18 weeks

== Certifications ==
Region	Certification	Certified units/sales
Japan (RIAJ)	Platinum	250,000^{^}
^{^} Shipments figures based on certification alone.

== Release history ==
Region	Date	Format	Label
Japan	December 17, 2014	CD+DVD; digital download	Avex Trax
South Korea	January 7, 2015	Digital download	S.M. Entertainment
Taiwan	January 30, 2015	CD+DVD; digital download	Avex Taiwan
South Korea	February 12, 2015	CD+DVD	S.M. Entertainment

== See also ==
- TVXQ albums discography
- List of Oricon number-one albums of 2014
