= Lovin' You (TVXQ song) =

- "Lovin' You" CD cover

Single by Tohoshinki

from the album T
- B-side: "五線紙 (Go Senshi)"
- Released: June 13, 2007
- Recorded: 2007
- Genre: J-pop
- Length: 5:52 (Album version); 5:11 (Radio edit)
- Label: Avex Trax/Rhythm Zone
- Songwriters: Lyrics: H. U. B., Composition: Mikio Sakai, Arrangement: Mikio Sakai

Tohoshinki singles chronology
"Choosey Lover" (2007)	"Lovin' You" (2007)	"Summer Dream / Song for You / Love in the Ice" (2007)

"Lovin' You" is Tohoshinki's 11th Japanese single, released on June 13, 2007. This single triggered the rising presence of the Korean group in the Japanese music industry, with the highest sales since their debut in Japan.

== Live performances ==
- 2007.06.02 - Music Fair 21
- 2007.06.09 - Music Japan (Choosey Lover and Lovin' You)

== Track listing ==
=== CD ===
1. "Lovin' You"
2. 五線紙 (Go Senshi)"
3. "約束 Extra NSB Mix (Yakusoku Extra)"
4. "Lovin' You" (Less Vocal)
5. "五線紙 (Go Senshi)" (Less Vocal)

=== DVD ===
1. "Lovin' You" (Video clip)
2. Offshoot Movie

== Music video ==
The video"s plot features a man and a woman in a relationship going in a bar and walking on the street. In the end of the video the man gets run over by a car when the woman leaves him. Throughout the video it shows scenes of the members in a bar on their own or they can be seen together in a backyard.

== Release history ==
Country	Date
Japan	June 13, 2007
South Korea	June 20, 2007

== Charts ==
=== Oricon Sales Chart (Japan) ===
Release	Chart	Peak position	Sales total	Chart run
June 13, 2007	Oricon Daily Singles Chart	2		
June 13, 2007	Oricon Weekly Singles Chart	2	49,495	10 weeks
June 13, 2007	Oricon Monthly Singles Chart	16		
June 13, 2007	Oricon Yearly Singles Chart			

=== Korea monthly foreign albums & singles ===
Release	Chart	Peak position	Sales total
June 20, 2007	June Monthly Chart	1	6,790
June 20, 2007	July Monthly Chart	5	9,255

=== Korea yearly foreign albums & singles ===
Release	Chart	Peak position	Sales total
June 20, 2007	2007	14	10,714
