= Catch Me (TVXQ song) =

- Cover for Japanese release

Single by TVXQ / Tohoshinki

from the album Catch Me and Time
- B-side: "I Know" (JP)
- Released: September 24, 2012 (KR); January 16, 2013 (JP)
- Recorded: 2012
- Studio: SM Booming System (Seoul)
- Genre: K-pop; J-pop; electropop; electro house
- Label: SM; Avex Trax
- Composer: Yoo Young-jin
- Lyricists: Yoo Young-jin (Korean); H.U.B (Japanese)
- Producer: Yoo Young-jin

TVXQ / Tohoshinki singles chronology
"Android" (2012)	"Catch Me" (2012)	"Humanoids" (2012)

Music video
- "Catch Me" (Korean version) on YouTube "I Know" on YouTube

"Catch Me" (stylized as "Catch Me -If you wanna-" in Japan) is a song by South Korean pop duo TVXQ, also known as Tohoshinki in Japan. Written and produced by Yoo Young-jin, two versions of "Catch Me" exist: the original Korean-language version, which served as the lead single for the duo's sixth Korean studio album Catch Me (2012), and a Japanese-language version, which was released as the fourth and last single for their sixth Japanese studio album, Time (2013). The Korean version of "Catch Me" was made available for download on September 24, 2012, the same date as the full album's digital release. The Japanese version of "Catch Me" was released by Avex Trax in Japan as TVXQ's 36th Japanese CD single on January 16, 2013.

A mix of house and dubstep, "Catch Me" was met with acclaim, with critics praising the back track's orchestral riffs and the duo's vocal harmony. The song was mildly successful in South Korea, peaking at number sixteen on the Gaon Singles Chart and number twenty-five on the Billboard Korea K-Pop Hot 100. In Japan, "Catch Me" debuted at number one on the Oricon Singles Chart and peaked atop the Billboard Japan Hot 100. Selling over 137,000 copies on its first week of release, "Catch Me" was certified gold by the Recording Industry Association of Japan (RIAJ) for shipments of over 100,000.

== Background and release ==
Written and produced by Yoo Young-jin, "Catch Me" is an electropop song with orchestral melodies, dubstep sounds, house beats, and powerful vocal belting. The lyrics are about a self-respected man who says good-bye to his lover but actually wants to hold onto her. The song was recorded in mid-2012 at the SM Booming System in Seoul.

The Korean version of "Catch Me" was announced on September 18, 2012, and a teaser clip of the song's accompanying music video was released on their official YouTube channel on September 21, 2012. The full music video was unveiled on September 24, the same day as the album's digital release.

"I Know", the B-side pop ballad track from the "Catch Me" Japanese single, is composed by T-SK, Tesung Kim and Andrew Choi, with the arrangement by T-SK and the lyrics written by Shinjiro Inoue. First released as a promotional single, the music video for "I Know" premiered on December 6, 2012. The short version of the "Catch Me" Japanese music video was released on January 6, 2014, and the full Japanese single was released on January 16, 2013. The song also served as the theme song for the Fuji TV drama Saki.

== Commercial and critical reception ==
"Catch Me" achieved moderate success in its native South Korea. It debuted at number sixteen on the Gaon Single Chart for the week ending September 29, 2012. With over 161,666 downloads in its first week, it peaked to number ten on the Gaon Download chart and thirty-four on the Streaming chart. The song attained a peak at number twenty-five on the K-Pop Hot 100. The Japanese released was more well-received, debuting at number-one on Oricon's Daily Singles Charts, selling 84,666 copies. It maintained its number one position the following day and sold an additional 25,349 copies, bringing its total sales to 110,015. The number-one single of the week, "Catch Me" finished off as the fourth best-selling single of January 2013 in Japan. The single also peaked atop the Billboard Japan Hot 100, number fifteen on the Billboard Japan Adult Contemporary Airplay and number thirty-two on the Billboard Japan Hot Top Airplay.

Critics described the song as "nostalgic", as the duo's vocal high-note belting performances are highly evocative of their older music. The dubstep bass line loop in the song, though met with mixed reviews initially, was later praised for being a good "fit" for the song. Writing for Fuse, Jeff Benjamin noted the song's choreography with "craft gravity-defying leans, quick jumps from ground to floor and splash through a water-infused video set." He included it on Fuse's list of "13 K-Pop Videos With the Most eye-Popping Choreography."

== Performances ==
=== Music video and choreography ===
The beat was two places at once; on one end it was this really hard-hitting heavy dubstep, and then it would just flip on a dime into this light piano-tingled, floating verse and chorus. So I was like constantly at war with myself, trying to figure out how I was going to make this song come to life conceptually.
—Tony Testa, TVXQ Catch Me — Production Note

The music video for "Catch Me" was directed by Jang Jae-huk. The dance choreography, noted for its intricacy and artistic imagery, is created by Tony Testa, who said the dance was inspired by the characters in the superhero film The Avengers, specifically the Hulk. In the choreography, Testa used the back-up dancers in a way that could show members U-Know Yunho and Max Changmin doing "superhuman" moves, such as extended arms and waves. Testa remarked that the back-up dancers in the piece were just "an emotion that represented anger". Testa came up with four different versions for the choreography, but all four versions were ultimately put into one performance. In an interview with South Korea's Asia Economy in October 2012, Yunho discussed about the choreography:

"The final choreography has a story like a musical and features what we call a 'Mirror dance' and 'Hulk dance.' While Changmin and I face each other and move in the same direction as if I'm facing a mirror, our back-up dancers connect our emotions through their separate moves."

Filming for the music video took place in August 2012 at the Ilsan Art House. On September 20, 2012, a teaser for the music video was released on their official YouTube channel. It opened with a shot of a cell, and showed solo shots of the duo. Yunho says "catch me if you wanna" and its electronic music picks up, inter cuts with shots of TVXQ dancing in water and mirrored sets. The full music video premiered on September 24, 2012.

The dance choreography received critical acclaim. The dance was complimented for being innovative, epic and iconic. The video and dance were described to be "highly stylized" and progressive, affirming that the duo are trend-setters for K-pop. A dance practice video for "Catch Me" was released on September 28, which also received praises from critics and netizens.

=== Live performances ===
Critics called "Catch Me" a spectacle with flashing lights. Their live performances of "Catch Me" were received with widespread critical acclaim. Viewers were impressed with TVXQ's vocal endurance, as they have managed to perform raw live performances despite having to do such taxing choreography. TVXQ debuted their first performance of "Catch Me" on Music Bank in South Korea on October 5, 2012. They performed the song at their Catch Me World Tour and the Japanese version at their Japan-wide Time Tour throughout 2013.

== Formats and track listings ==
- Korean digital download
1. "Catch Me" – 4:38
- Japanese digital download EP
1. "Catch Me -If you wanna-" – 4:38
2. "I Know" – 4:24
3. "I Know -unplugged version-" – 3:56
4. "Catch Me -If you wanna" (Less Vocal) – 4:38
5. "I Know" (Less Vocal) – 4:24
- Japanese CD+DVD single AVCK-79119

Disc 1 (CD)

1. "Catch Me -If you wanna-" – 4:38
2. "I Know" – 4:24
3. "Catch Me -If you wanna-" (Less Vocal) – 4:38
4. "I Know" (Less Vocal) – 3:24

Disc 2 (DVD)

1. "Catch Me -If you wanna-" (Video Clip)
2. "I Know" (Video Clip)
3. "Catch Me -If you wanna-" (Off Shot Movie) (First Press Limited Edition only)
- Japanese CD single AVCK-79120
1. "Catch Me -If you wanna-" – 4:38
2. "I Know" – 4:24
3. "I Know -unplugged version-" – 3:56
4. "Catch Me -If you wanna-" (Less Vocal) – 4:38
5. "I Know" (Less Vocal) – 3:24
6. CD EXTRA: "MAXIMUM" (a-nation Summer Fest performance)
- Japanese CD single (Bigeast limited edition) AVC1-79121
1. "Catch Me -If you wanna-" – 4:38
2. "I Know" – 4:24
3. "Catch Me -If you wanna-" (Less Vocal) – 4:38
4. "I Know" (Less Vocal) – 3:24
5. CD EXTRA: Jacket Making Movie

== Credits ==
Credits adapted from album's liner notes.

Studio

- SM Booming System – recording, mixing
- Studio-T – strings recording
- Sonic Korea – mastering

Personnel

- SM Entertainment – executive producer
- Lee Soo-man – producer
- Kim Young-min – executive supervisor
- TVXQ – vocals, background vocals
- H.U.B – Japanese lyrics
- Yoo Young-jin – producer, Korean lyrics, composition, arrangement, vocal directing, background vocals, recording, mixing
- Shim Sang-won – strings arrangement, strings conducting
- Yung – strings
- Oh Seong-geun – strings recording
- Song Joo-yong – strings recording assistant
- Jeon Hoon – mastering

== Charts ==
=== Weekly charts ===
Chart (2012–13)	Peak position
South Korea (Gaon)	16
South Korea (K-pop Hot 100)	25
Japan Singles (Oricon)	1
Japan (Japan Hot 100)	1
Japan Adult Contemporary (Billboard)	15
Japan Hot Top Airplay (Billboard)	32

=== Year-end charts ===
Chart (2013)	Peak position
Japan Singles (Oricon)	42

== Sales and certifications ==
Region	Certification	Certified units/sales
Japan (RIAJ) Physical single	Gold	100,000^{^}
Japan (RIAJ) Digital single	Gold	100,000^{*}
South Korea (Gaon)	—	595,000
^{*} Sales figures based on certification alone.^{^} Shipments figures based on certification alone.
