= Forever Love (TVXQ song) =

- CD cover

Single by Tohoshinki

from the album T
- B-side: "Day Moon: ハルダル"
- Released: November 14, 2007
- Genre: J-Pop
- Length: 6:01 (Music video version); 5:27 (Radio edit); 10:18 (Album version)
- Label: Avex Trax/Rhythm Zone
- Songwriters: Lyrics: Ryoji Sonoda, Composition: Ichiro Fujitani, Arrangement: Jin Nakamura

Tohoshinki singles chronology
"Last Angel" (2007)	"Forever Love" (2007)	"Together" (2007)

"Forever Love" is Tohoshinki's 14th Japanese single. The single was released on November 14, 2007.

== Track listing ==
=== CD ===
1. "Forever Love"
2. "Day Moon: ハルダル"
3. "Forever Love" (A cappella version)
4. "Forever Love" (Less Vocal)
5. "Day Moon: ハルダル" (Less Vocal)

=== DVD ===
1. "Forever Love" (Video clip)
2. Off Shot Movie

== Release history ==
Country	Date
Japan	November 14, 2007
South Korea	November 21, 2007
Hong Kong	November 25, 2007

== Live performances ==
- 2007.11.03 - Music Fair 21
- 2007.11.16 - NHK Music Japan
- 2008.02.22 - NHK Music Japan

== Charts ==
=== Oricon sales chart (Japan) ===
Release	Chart	Peak position	Sales total
November 14, 2007	Oricon Daily Singles Chart	3	
November 14, 2007	Oricon Weekly Singles Chart	4	43,434
November 14, 2007	Oricon Monthly Singles Chart	15	
November 14, 2007	Oricon Yearly Singles Chart		49,607

=== Korea monthly foreign albums & singles ===
Release	Chart	Position	Sales total
November 21, 2007	November (Monthly) Chart	2	8,772

=== Korea yearly foreign albums & singles ===
Release	Chart	Position	Sales total
November 21, 2007	2007	21	9,494
