= Together (TVXQ song) =

- CD cover

Single by Tohoshinki

from the album T
- Released: December 19, 2007
- Recorded: 2007
- Genre: J-Pop, electropop, bubblegum Pop
- Length: 3:32
- Label: Avex Trax/Rhythm Zone
- Producer: rhythm zone

Tohoshinki singles chronology
"Forever Love" (2007)	"Together" (2007)	"Purple Line" (2008)

"Together" is Tohoshinki's 15th Japanese single. It was released on December 19, 2007 and debuted at #2 on the Oricon Daily Charts, ending as #3 overall for the week. Together is used as the ending song for the Sanrio and Madhouse animated film, Cinnamon The Movie.

== Track listing ==
=== CD ===
1. "Together"
2. "Together" (Kids Chorus version)
3. "Forever Love" (Bell'n'Snow Edit)
4. "Together" (Less Vocal)

=== DVD ===
1. "Together" (Video clip)
2. Off Shot Movie

== Music video ==
The official music video was an animation featuring the TVXQ members helping out boys who are in a dance competition.

== Release history ==
Country	Date
Japan	December 19, 2007
South Korea	December 26, 2007

== Charts ==
=== Oricon sales chart (Japan) ===
Release	Chart	Peak position	Sales total
December 1, 2007	Oricon Daily Singles Chart	2	
December 1, 2007	Oricon Weekly Singles Chart	3	39,595
December 1, 2007	Oricon Monthly Singles Chart	24	
December 1, 2007	Oricon Yearly Singles Chart	181	39,595

=== Korea monthly foreign albums & singles (Top 20) ===
Release	Chart	Position	Sales total
December 26, 2007	December Monthly Chart	5	6,235
