= Shine / Ride On =

- CD cover

Single by Tohoshinki

from the album T
- Released: September 19, 2007
- Genre: J-Pop, electropop, bubblegum pop, hip hop
- Length: 4:02 (Album version); 3:44 (Single edit)
- Label: Avex Trax/Rhythm Zone
- Songwriters: Lyrics: H.U.B., Composition: REO, Arrangement: AKIRA

Tohoshinki singles chronology
"Summer Dream / Song for You / Love in the Ice" (2007)	"Shine / Ride On" (2007)	"Last Angel" (2007)

"Shine" / "Ride On" is Tohoshinki's 13th Japanese single. The single was released on September 19, 2007. The single debuted at #2 only behind Ayumi Hamasaki's single "Talkin' 2 Myself" which outsold it by 36,634 copies. The song "Shine" is used as the theme song for the drama "Obanzai".

== Track listing ==
=== CD (first press) ===
1. "Shine"
2. "Ride On"
3. "Lovin' You: Haru's "Deep Water" Mix"
4. "Shine" (Less Vocal)
5. "Ride On" (Less Vocal)

=== CD (regular) ===
1. "Shine"
2. "Ride On"
3. "Shine" (Less Vocal)
4. "Ride On" (Less Vocal)

=== DVD ===
1. "Shine" (Video clip)
2. Off Shot Movie

== Live performances ==
- September 24, 2007 - Hey! Hey! Hey!
- September 22, 2007 - NHK Music Japan

== Release history ==
Country	Date
Japan	September 19, 2007
South Korea	September 28, 2007

== Charts ==
=== Oricon sales chart (Japan) ===
Release	Chart	Peak position	Sales total
September 19, 2007	Oricon daily singles chart	2	
September 19, 2007	Oricon weekly singles chart	2	41,978
September 19, 2007	Oricon monthly singles chart	12	41,593

=== Korea monthly foreign albums and singles ===
Release	Chart	Position	Sales total
September 28, 2007	September monthly chart	1	10,000

=== Korea yearly foreign albums and singles ===
Release	Chart	Position	Sales total
September 28, 2007	2007	12	12,355
