= Time (TVXQ album) =

Studio album by Tohoshinki
- Released: March 6, 2013
- Recorded: 2011–2013
- Genre: J-pop; R&B; electropop; dance-pop; dubstep
- Length: 52:35
- Language: Japanese
- Label: Avex Trax
- Producer: Nam So-young (gen.); Ryuhei Chiba (gen.); Katsutoshi Yasuhara; DWB Music; Yoo Young-jin; T-SK; HiDE Kawada; Vacuum; Trinity Music; Kenzie; Emil Carlin

Tohoshinki chronology
Catch Me (2012)	Time (2013)	Tense (2014)

Singles from Time
- 1. "Winter Rose" Released: November 30, 2011; 2. "Still" Released: March 13, 2012; 3. "Android" Released: July 11, 2012; 4. "Catch Me -If you wanna-" Released: January 16, 2013; 5. "In Our Time" Released: March 6, 2013

Time (stylized in all caps) is the sixth Japanese studio album (twelfth overall) by South Korean pop duo Tohoshinki, released by Avex Trax on March 6, 2013. The record was released in four physical versions, each with a theme cover – Version A (Past), a CD+DVD version with music videos; Version B (Present), another CD+DVD version with off-shot movies and live performances; Version C (Future), a CD only version with two bonus tracks; and Version D, a Bigeast fan club limited edition. Musically, Time is primarily an electropop album, with dubstep, electronic dance music, and R&B influences.

Time was Tohoshinki's fastest-selling studio album, selling over 160,000 copies on the first day and over 240,000 copies within the first week of release. The album was also Tohoshinki's third consecutive album to debut at the top of the Oricon Albums Chart and the Billboard Japan Top Albums.

The album spawned four hit singles, all of which peaked within the Top 2 on the Oricon Weekly Charts and sold over 150,000 copies each.

== Background ==
It was first announced that Tohoshinki would be releasing their sixth Japanese album on January 16, 2013, through their official Japanese site. The album's title was revealed to be Time and that its release date was March 6, 2013. It was also stated that the album would come in four versions: CD version, 2 CD+DVD versions, and a special BigEast version.

== Commercial performance ==
The album was commercial success selling 160,719 copies during the first day of release, thus becoming their fastest-selling Japanese studio album and second-fastest selling Japanese release to date. It sold a further 35,930 copies on the second day, bringing total sales over the first 48 hours to 196,649 copies. It sold a further 13,781 copies on the third day of sale, bringing the three-day sales total to 210,430 copies. Displaying their immense popularity in Japan, this album also marked TVXQ's 2nd grab for the first place on the Oricon Monthly Chart with over 277,000 copies sold, beating out Kiss My FT2, and others. Until now, Time has sold over 281,260 copies. As of June 21, 2013, Time is the fourth biggest-selling album of the year in Japan with total sales of 292,632 copies according to Oricon.

== Track listing ==
Time track list
No.	Title	Lyrics	Music	Arrangement	Length
1.	"Fated"	H.U.B	Paul Drew (DWB Music); Greig Watts (DWB Music); Pete Barringer (DWB Music); Christopher Wortley	DWB Music; Christopher Wortley	5:27
2.	"Catch Me -If you wanna-" (Japanese Version)	Yoo Young-jin; H.U.B	Yoo Young-jin	Yoo Young-jin	4:37
3.	"Really Want to See You" (逢いたくて逢いたくてたまらない (Aitakute Aitakute Tamaranai))	Shinjiroh Inoue (Lambsey)	Shinjiroh Inoue (Lambsey)	Shinjiroh Inoue (Lambsey)	4:12
4.	"One More Thing"	H.U.B	Her0ism; Shirose (White Jam); Shimada	Her0ism; Shirose (White Jam); Shimada	3:54
5.	"Still"	Shinjiroh Inoue (Lambsey)	Shinjiroh Inoue (Lambsey)	Shinjiroh Inoue (Lambsey)	4:31
6.	"I Know"	Shinjiroh Inoue (Lambsey)	Chizaki "T-SK" Taisuke; Tesung Kim (Iconic Sounds); Andrew Choi	Chizaki "T-SK" Taisuke; Tesung Kim (Iconic Sounds); Andrew Choi	4:25
7.	"Y3K"	H.U.B	Mattias Lindblom (Vacuum); Anders Wollbeck (Vacuum); Herbie Crichlow; Martin Mulholland	Vacuum	4:09
8.	"Blink"	H.U.B	Fredrik Häggstam (Trinity Music); Johan Gustafsson (Trinity Music); Sebastian Lundberg (Trinity Music); Andrew Jackson	Trinity Music; Andrew Jackson	3:50
9.	"Humanoids" (Japanese version)	Lee Kyung-nam; Lee Sol-bi; H.U.B	Thomas Troelsen; Kenzie	Thomas Troelsen; Donald "haZEL" Sales	3:30
10.	"Android"	H.U.B	Anders Grahn; Grace Tither; Emil Carlin	Anders Grahn; Grace Tither; Emil Carlin	4:20
11.	"One and Only One"	Shinjiroh Inoue (Lambsey)	Peter Kvint; Jonas Myrin	Shinjiroh Inoue (Lambsey); Peter Kvint; Jonas Myrin	3:37
12.	"In Our Time"	Shinjiroh Inoue (Lambsey)	Shinjiroh Inoue (Lambsey)	Shinjiroh Inoue (Lambsey)	6:03
Total length:					52:35

Time Version C track list
No.	Title	Lyrics	Music	Arrangement	Length
13.	"Rat Tat Tat"	H.U.B	Adam Nierow (Mr. Fantastic); Peter Habib (Mr. Fantastic); Ryan Marrone (Ryan & Smitty); Garrick "Smitty" Smith (Ryan & Smitty)	Shinjiroh Inoue (Lambsey); Mr. Fantastic; Ryan & Smitty	3:17
14.	"Winter Rose"	Gorō Matsui	Jeff Miyahara; Erik Lidbom	Jeff Miyahara; Erik Lidbom	4:45
Total length:					60:37

Time Version A (Past) DVD
No.	Title	Length
1.	"Winter Rose" (Video Clip)
2.	"STILL" (Video Clip)
3.	"ANDROID" (Video Clip)
4.	"Catch Me -If you wanna-" (Video Clip)
5.	"I Know" (Video Clip)
6.	"Humanoids" (Video Clip)
7.	"In Our Time" (Video Clip)
8.	"Shiawase Iro no Hana (シアワセ色の花)" (Tone: Live Tour 2012 Documentary Film)
9.	"ANDROID" (Dance Version)
10.	"Catch Me -If you wanna-" (Dance Version)
11.	"Humanoids" (Dance Version)
12.	"Catch Me -If you wanna-" (Lip Only Version / First Press Limited Edition)

Time Version B (Present) DVD
No.	Title	Length
1.	"MAXIMUM" (Live at a-nation 2012 stadium festival)
2.	"Why? (Keep Your Head Down)" (Live at a-nation 2012 stadium festival)
3.	"Somebody to Love" (Live at a-nation 2012 stadium festival)
4.	"I Don't Know" (2011.11.3 @ Tokyo International Forum - Digest)
5.	"B.U.T (BE-AU-TY)" (2011.11.3 @ Tokyo International Forum - Digest)
6.	"I Know" (Off Shot Movie)
7.	"Humanoids" (Off Shot Movie)
8.	"Album Jacket Photoshoot" (Off Shot Movie)

Notes

- Version D is only available on the Bigeast Official Shop, which requires Bigeast membership.

== Charts ==
=== Weekly charts ===
Chart (2013)	Peak position
Japanese Albums (Oricon)	1
Japanese Top Albums (Billboard)	1
South Korean Albums (Gaon)	6

=== Year-end charts ===
Chart (2013)	Position
Japanese Albums (Oricon)	10

== Sales and certifications ==
Region	Certification	Certified units/sales
Japan (RIAJ)	Platinum	298,389
South Korea	—	16,229

== Release history ==
Country	Date	Format(s)	Label	Edition(s)
Japan	March 6, 2013	CD, digital download	Avex Trax	CD (Jacket C)
Japan	March 6, 2013	CD, digital download	Avex Trax	CD+DVD (Jacket A)
Japan	March 6, 2013	CD, digital download	Avex Trax	CD+DVD (Jacket B)
Japan	March 6, 2013	CD, digital download	Avex Trax	Bigeast version

== See also ==
- TVXQ albums discography
- List of Oricon number-one albums of 2013
