= Android (song) =

Single by Tohoshinki

from the album Time
- B-side: "Blink"
- Released: July 11, 2012
- Recorded: 2012
- Genre: J-pop, electropop, dubstep
- Label: Avex Trax
- Songwriters: Anders Grahn; Grace Tither; E Carlin; Hub
- Producer: Emil Carlin

Tohoshinki singles chronology
"Still" (2012)	"Android" (2012)	"Catch Me" (2012)

"Android" (stylized as "ANDROID") is the 35th Japanese single by South Korean pop duo Tohoshinki. It was released on July 11, 2012, as the third single from their sixth Japanese studio album, Time (2013). The digital single reached a total of 3.1 million in sales, the highest of any foreign artist in the country. "Android" was released in three editions – a CD+DVD version, a CD-only version, and a Bigeast Board edition.

Produced and co-written by Emil Carlin, "Android" is a dubstep song with a futuristic theme. It peaked at number one on Japan's Oricon weekly charts, and was the fourth best-selling single of the month. It also peaked at number two on Billboard's Japan Hot 100 and Japan Hot Singles Sales charts. After the first week of release, it was certified gold by the Recording Industry Association of Japan (RIAJ).

== Background and release ==
"Android" was released on July 11, 2012. The song was first played on Bay FM radio in Japan on the night of June 16, 2012, a month prior to its release. "Android" was the first dance-orientated track the duo has released since "Superstar" and "B.U.T.", both which were released in 2011. The single was offered digitally via iTunes Japan, as well as three physical editions. The regular edition CD, a limited edition CD+DVD combo with the "Android" music video as well as an "Off-Shot Movie," and the CD+DVD, all which contained the title track "Android" and the B-side "Blink", which was written by Johan Gustafson, Fredrik Haggstam, Sebastian Lundberg and Andrew Jackson.

== Commercial reception ==
"Android" sold over 98,550 copies on its first day, and went on to sell over 152,000 copies in its first week, debuting at number one on Oricon's Weekly and Daily single charts. The song's sales help push Tohoshinki's single sales in the country to over 3.1 million, breaking the 10 year 10 month record set by The Carpenters for the highest single sales of any international artist in Japan. The group also broke their own record by being the first international artist to debut atop the Oricon chart eleven times.

== Formats and track listings ==
- Digital download EP
1. "ANDROID" – 4:22
2. "BLINK" – 3:51
3. "ANDROID" (modest gothic remix) – 4:20
4. "ANDROID" (Less Vocal) – 4:22
5. "BLINK" (Less Vocal) – 3:51
- CD+DVD single AVCK-79079

Disc 1 (CD)

1. "ANDROID" – 4:22
2. "BLINK" – 3:51
3. "ANDROID" (Less Vocal) – 4:22
4. "BLINK" (Less Vocal) – 3:51

Disc 2 (DVD)

1. "ANDROID" (Video Clip)
2. "ANDROID" (Off Shot Movie) (Limited edition only)
- CD single AVCK-79081
1. "ANDROID" – 4:22
2. "BLINK" – 3:51
3. "ANDROID" (modest gothic remix) – 4:20
4. "ANDROID" (Less Vocal) – 4:22
5. "BLINK" (Less Vocal) – 3:51

== Charts ==
=== Oricon charts ===
Released	Oricon chart	Peak	Debut sales	Sales total	Chart run
July 11, 2012	Daily Singles Chart	1	98,550 (debut); 152,412 (weekly)	175,544	9 weeks
July 11, 2012	Weekly Singles Chart	1	98,550 (debut); 152,412 (weekly)	175,544	9 weeks
July 11, 2012	Monthly Singles Chart	4	98,550 (debut); 152,412 (weekly)	175,544	9 weeks
July 11, 2012	Yearly Singles Chart	40	98,550 (debut); 152,412 (weekly)	175,544	9 weeks

=== Billboard Japan charts ===
Chart (2012)	Peak position
Billboard Japan Adult Contemporary Airplay	34
Billboard Japan Hot Top Airplay	35
Billboard Japan Hot 100 Weekly	2
Billboard Japan Hot Singles Sales	1

=== Other charts ===
Chart (2012)	Peak	Sales total
South Korean Albums (Gaon)	16	3,838

== Certifications ==
Region	Certification	Certified units/sales
Japan (RIAJ)	Gold	100,000^{^}
^{^} Shipments figures based on certification alone.
