= Purple Line (song) =

- "Purple Line" CD cover

Single by Tohoshinki

from the album T
- B-side: "Dead End - STY Gin n' Tonic mix, Zion - Zero G Remix"
- Released: January 15, 2008
- Recorded: 2007–2008
- Genre: J-pop, K-pop, R&B, hip hop, synth-pop
- Length: 3:15
- Label: SM/Avex Trax/Rhythm Zone
- Songwriters: Japanese Lyrics: H.U.B, Korean lyrics: Yoo Han Jin, Composition: Yoo Han Jin, JJ650, Yoo Young Jin
- Producer: Lee Soo Man

Tohoshinki singles chronology
"Together" (2007)	"Purple Line" (2008)	"Two Hearts / Wild Soul" (2008)

"Purple Line" is Tohoshinki's 16th Japanese single, written by the Korean composer who made Tohoshinki's biggest hits in Korea such as "Rising Sun" and ""O"-Jung.Ban.Hap." It became Tohoshinki's first Japanese single to reach #1 on the Oricon Weekly sales chart in Japan, making the group the first foreign male group or boyband to top the Japanese charts and second Korean artist after BoA to do so. "Purple Line" was Tohoshinki's first single that was originally released in Japanese and later released in Korean as a single. According to the members, the name "Purple Line" refers to the thin rays of light on horizon when the sun sets. Despite being the first #1 single from Tohoshinki, it is not their strongest single in terms of physical sales, with "Break Out!" having the biggest lead in Japan. It was released a week before their third Japanese album T which included the song in its tracks.

== Music video ==
The music video was shot in South Korea, the first time for a Japanese single by the group. The producers used new strategies to market the song and the video. First, a shortened music video was released in Japan for the Japanese version of the song. On January 24, 2008, a Korean version of "Purple Line" was also released. On February 4, 2008, SM Entertainment surprised fans with the release of the full music video; however, with the Korean version of the song. A Japanese version of the full music video was also released a few days later.

== Live performances ==
=== Japan ===
- 2008.01.18 - NHK Music Japan
- 2008.01.25 - Music Fighter
- 2008.01.26 - Melodix!
- 2008.01.28 - Hey! Hey! Hey! Music Champ
- 2008.02.02 - Music Fair 21
- 2008.02.08 - NHK Music Japan
- 2008.02.11 - 月光音楽団
- 2008 - a-nation 2008 (several dates)

=== South Korea ===
- 2008.02.24 - SBS Inkigayo
- 2008.02.29 - KBS Music Bank
- 2008.05.17 - 6th Annual Korean Music Festival (in USA)
- 2008.06.07 - Dream concert
- 2008.06.15 - Super Triple Concert
- 2008.07.20 - KBS 60th Anniversary of Korean Constitution
- 2008.08.15 - Summer SMTown Concert 2008

== Track listing ==
=== Japan ===
==== CD ====
1. "Purple Line"
2. "Dead End" (STY Gin n' Tonic mix)
3. "Zion" (Zero G Remix)
4. "Purple Line" (Less Vocal)
5. "Dead End" (STY Gin n' Tonic mix) (Less Vocal)

==== DVD ====
1. Asia Tour Bangkok Show Off Shot Movie
2. Asia Tour Bangkok Show Special Off Shot Movie

=== South Korea ===
==== CD ====
1. "Purple Line"
2. "Dead End" (STY Gin n' Tonic mix)
3. "Zion" (Zero G Remix)
4. "Purple Line" (Less Vocal)
5. "Dead End" (STY Gin n' Tonic mix) (Less Vocal)
6. Purple Line (Korean version)

==== DVD ====
1. Asia Tour Bangkok Show Off Shot Movie
2. Asia Tour Bangkok Show Special Off Shot Movie

== Release history ==
Country	Date
Japan	January 15, 2008
South Korea	January 23, 2008
Hong Kong	January 27, 2008

== Charts ==
=== Oricon sales chart (Japan) ===
Release	Chart	Peak position	Sales total
January 16, 2008	Oricon Daily Singles Chart	1	28,892
January 16, 2008	Oricon Weekly Singles Chart	1	47,303
January 16, 2008	Oricon Monthly Singles Chart	4	44,158
January 16, 2008	Oricon Yearly Singles Chart	150	47,303

=== Korea Top 20 foreign albums & singles ===
Release	Chart	Peak position	Sales
January 23, 2008	January Monthly Chart	2	12,726
January 23, 2008	February Monthly Chart	12	2,784
January 23, 2008	March Monthly Chart	16	1,806
