= Time Works Wonders =

Single by Tohoshinki

from the album With
- B-side: "Baby, Don't Cry"
- Released: November 5, 2014
- Recorded: 2014
- Genre: J-pop
- Label: Avex Trax
- Songwriters: Peter Gordeno; Jamie Hartman
- Producer: Peter Gordeno

Tohoshinki singles chronology
"Sweat / Answer" (2014)	"Time Works Wonders" (2014)	"Sakuramichi" (2015)

Music video
- "Time Works Wonders" (Sand art ver.) on YouTube

"Time Works Wonders" is the 42nd Japanese single by South Korean pop duo Tohoshinki, released on November 5, 2014 by Avex Trax. It was released in three versions – a CD+DVD version, a CD only version, and a fan club edition exclusively for Tohoshinki's Japanese fan club, Bigeast.

The single debuted atop the Billboard Japan Hot 100 and peaked at number two on the Oricon Singles Chart, selling 107,000 copies on the first week. It was certified gold by the Recording Industry Association of Japan (RIAJ) for shipments of over 100,000. With the release of "Time Works Wonders", Tohoshinki became the best-selling foreign music act of all-time in CD singles, breaking a record previously held by Hong Kong singer Agnes Chan.

== Release and promotion ==
The single, a soul ballad, was first announced on August 22 through Tohoshinki's official website. The cover arts were revealed on September 20. Behind the scenes footage of the single's PV was aired on September 24. The official PV was unveiled on September 27, and a special edition–the sand animation version–was released on October 19.

To promote the single, Tohoshinki collaborated with DiverCity Tokyo Plaza for a holiday lighting ceremony, titled Illumination with Red. The opening ceremony, which used over 400,000 silver and red LEDs, was held on October 30. A Tohoshinki exhibition was also held at the mall from November 4 to 21. The exhibition showcased all twelve Japanese singles released by Tohoshinki since 2011's "Keep Your Head Down", Tohoshinki's first comeback as a duo.

"Time Works Wonders" was performed for the first time on November 1 at Tohoshinki's Bigeast fanclub tour, The Mission III in Osaka.

== Chart performance ==
"Time Works Wonders" debuted at number one on Japan's Tower Records and number two on the daily Oricon Singles Chart, selling 72,322 copies on the first day. Two days later, the single peaked at number one. On the weekly Oricon, "Time Works Wonders" debuted at number two, selling 107,000 copies. On the Billboard Japan Hot 100, the single debuted at number one and stayed charted for four consecutive weeks. "Time Works Wonders" peaked at number 19 on the Billboard Japan Adult Contemporary Airplay.

== Formats and track listings ==
- Digital download EP
1. "Time Works Wonders" – 3:52
2. "Baby, don't cry" – 3:43
3. "Time Works Wonders -A Cappella Version" – 3:55
4. "Time Works Wonders -Less Vocal-" – 3:52
5. "Baby, don't cry -Less Vocal-" – 3:43
- CD+DVD single AVCK-79218/B

Disc 1 (CD)

1. "Time Works Wonders"
2. "Baby, don't cry"
3. "Time Works Wonders -Less Vocal-"
4. "Baby, don't cry -Less Vocal-"

Disc 2 (DVD)

1. "Time Works Wonders" (Video Clip)
2. "Time Works Wonders" (Off Shot Movie) (First Press only)
- CD single AVCK-79219
1. "Time Works Wonders"
2. "Baby, don't cry"
3. "Time Works Wonders -A Cappella Version-"
4. "Time Works Wonders -Less Vocal-"
5. "Baby, don't cry -Less Vocal-"
6. CD-EXTRA: Jacket Making Movie (First Press only)
- CD single (Bigeast limited edition) AVC1-79221
1. "Time Works Wonders"
2. "Baby, don't cry"
3. "Time Works Wonders -Less Vocal-"
4. "Baby, don't cry -Less Vocal-"
5. CD-EXTRA: a-nation stadium fes. 2014 Digest

== Charts ==
Chart (2014)	Peak position
Japan (Oricon Singles Chart)	2
Billboard Japan Hot 100	1
Billboard Japan Hot Single Sales	2
Billboard Japan Adult Contemporary Airplay	19

=== Sales ===
Released	Oricon chart	Peak	Debut sales	Sales total
November 5, 2014	Daily Singles Chart	1	72,322	115,877
November 5, 2014	Weekly Singles Chart	2	106,970	115,877
November 5, 2014	Monthly Singles Chart	6	113,956	115,877
November 5, 2014	Yearly Singles Chart	59	114,772	115,877

== Certifications ==
Region	Certification	Certified units/sales
Japan (RIAJ)	Gold	100,000^{^}
^{^} Shipments figures based on certification alone.

== Release history ==
Region	Date	Format	Label
Worldwide (except United States)	November 5, 2014	Digital download	Avex Music Creative
Japan	November 5, 2014	CD; CD+DVD; digital download	Avex Trax
South Korea	November 12, 2014	Digital download	S.M. Entertainment
Taiwan	November 28, 2014	CD; CD+DVD; digital download	Avex Taiwan
