= Summer (Tohoshinki single) =

"Summer: Summer Dream / Song for You / Love in the Ice"
- CD cover

Single by Tohoshinki

from the album T
- Released: August 1, 2007
- Recorded: 2007
- Genre: J-pop; dance-pop; R&B
- Length: 4:57
- Label: Avex Trax; Rhythm Zone
- Songwriter: H.U.B.
- Producers: Tatta Works; H-Wonder

Tohoshinki singles chronology
"Lovin' You" (2007)	"Summer: Summer Dream / Song for You / Love in the Ice" (2007)	"Shine / Ride On" (2007)

"Summer: Summer Dream / Song for You / Love in the Ice" is Tohoshinki's 12th Japanese single. It was released on August 1, 2007, and debuted at #1 on the Oricon Daily Charts, ending as #2 overall for the week. It was TVXQ's first single in Japan to reach this position on the daily charts and was considered a milestone for the Korean boyband's rising popularity in Japan. With the success of the single, TVXQ won the Gold Artist Award in Best Hits 2007 Japan on November 26.

== Live performances ==
- 2007.07.28 - Music Fighter
- 2007.08.06 - Hey! Hey! Hey! Music Champ
- 2007.08.31 - a-nation 2007
- 2007.11.26 - Best Hits 2007 Japan
- 2008.07.26 - Music fair 21
- 2008 - T Concert Tour (several dates)
- 2008 - a-nation 2008 (several dates)

== Track listing ==
=== CD ===
1. "Summer Dream"
2. "Song for You"
3. "Love in the Ice"
4. "Summer Dream" (Less Vocal)
5. "Hug" (A cappella ver.)
6. "Song for You" (Less Vocal)
7. "Love in the Ice" (Less Vocal)

=== DVD ===
1. "Summer Dream" (Video clip)
2. Off Shot Movie

== Music video ==
The music video of "Summer Dream" features the members dancing in front of a pond, also their dancing with back up dancers, as the video goes on it shows scenes where Yuchun is driving a car and collecting the members, In the end the members are seen on beach when it comes to sunset. No music video was made for "Love in the Ice" and "Song for You".

== Charts ==
=== Weekly charts ===
Chart (2007)	Peak position
Japan Singles (Oricon)	2

=== Monthly charts ===
Chart (2007)	Peak position
South Korean Int'l Albums (MIAK)	2

=== Year-end charts ===
Chart (2007)	Position
Japan Singles (Oricon)	64
South Korean Int'l Albums (MIAK)	8

== Sales and certifications ==
Region	Certification	Certified units/sales
Japan (RIAJ)	Gold	124,529
South Korea (Gaon)	—	16,536
