= Sweat / Answer =

Single by Tohoshinki

from the album With
- Released: June 11, 2014
- Recorded: 2013
- Genre: J-pop; dance
- Label: Avex Trax
- Songwriters: Hanif Sabzevar; Kevin Borg; Nicklas Eklund ("Sweat"); UTA; Hiro; Sunny Bo ("Answer")
- Producers: Nicklas Eklund ("Sweat"); UTA ("Answer")

Tohoshinki singles chronology
"Spellbound" (2014)	"Sweat / Answer" (2014)	"Time Works Wonders" (2014)

Music video
- "Sweat" (Short ver.) on YouTube

"Sweat / Answer" is the 41st Japanese single by South Korean pop duo Tohoshinki, released on June 11, 2014 by Avex Trax. It is a double A-sided single featuring "Sweat", a summer-themed jazz-pop dance track; and "Answer", a mid-tempo electropop song that was used as the theme song for the 2013 Japanese television crime drama, Hard Nut (ハードナッツ！). The single was released in three versions – a CD+DVD version, a CD only version, and a fan club edition exclusively for Tohoshinki's Japanese fan club, Bigeast.

The single debuted atop the Billboard Japan Hot 100 and peaked at number two on the Oricon Singles Chart. It was certified gold by the Recording Industry Association of Japan (RIAJ) for shipments of over 100,000.

== Release and promotion ==
"Answer" was used as the theme song for the Japanese crime drama Hard Nut, which premiered on the satellite television channel NHK BS-Premium in October 2013. It is pinned to be an electropop song with "emotional" vocals. On April 22, 2014, the first day of Tohoshinki's seventh nationwide concert tour Tree: Live Tour 2014, a notice was put up on Tohoshinki's official website announcing the official release date of the new single. "Sweat" was described to be a "mature" jazz-pop dance song that is suitable for the summer. The duo included a performance of "Sweat" for the encore segment of their Tree Tour, which is expected to conclude on June 22, 2014 in Osaka.

Tohoshinki's official website revealed the artworks for the single on May 15. The jackets were filmed on April 19 at Chatan, Okinawa, where the promotional video for "Sweat" was also filmed. The video shoot, which took twelve hours to film, was officially released online on May 23.

== Chart performance ==
Debuting at number two on the daily Oricon Singles Chart, "Sweat / Answer" sold 78,053 copies on the first day of release. It maintained its number-two spot for the next few days, eventually reaching to number-one on the sixth day of release. On the weekly Oricon Singles Chart, "Sweat / Answer" debuted at number two with 119,301 copies sold in the first week. On the Billboard Japan Hot 100, the single debuted at number one. "Sweat" peaked at number 47 on the Billboard Japan Adult Contemporary Airplay.

== Formats and track listings ==
- Digital download single
1. "Sweat" – 3:33
2. "Answer" – 3:47
- CD+DVD single AVCK-79199/B

Disc 1 (CD)

1. "Sweat"
2. "Answer"
3. "Sweat -Less Vocal-"
4. "Answer -Less Vocal-"

Disc 2 (DVD)

1. "Sweat" (Video Clip)
2. "Sweat" (Off Shot Movie) (AVCK-79197/B – First Press only)
- CD single AVCK-79198
1. "Sweat"
2. "Answer"
3. "Sweat -Boogie-Woogie Version"
4. "Sweat -Less Vocal-"
5. "Answer -Less Vocal-"
6. CD-EXTRA: Jacket Making Movie (First Press only)
- CD single (Bigeast limited edition) AVC1-79200
1. "Sweat"
2. "Answer"
3. "Sweat -Less Vocal-"
4. "Answer -Less Vocal-"
5. CD-EXTRA: Tree Off Shot Movie

== Charts ==
Chart (2014)	Peak position
Japan (Oricon Singles Chart)	2
Billboard Japan Hot 100	1
Billboard Hot Single Sales	2
Billboard Japan Adult Contemporary Airplay	47

=== Sales ===
Released	Oricon chart	Peak	Debut sales	Sales total
June 11, 2014	Daily Singles Chart	1	78,053	140,300
June 11, 2014	Weekly Singles Chart	2	119,301	140,300
June 11, 2014	Monthly Singles Chart	4	136,684	140,300
June 11, 2014	Yearly Singles Chart	48	140,300	140,300

== Release history ==
Region	Date	Format	Label
Worldwide (except United States)	June 11, 2014	Digital download	Avex Entertainment
Japan	June 11, 2014	CD; CD+DVD; digital download	Avex Trax
South Korea	June 11, 2014	Digital download	S.M. Entertainment
Taiwan	July 4, 2014	CD; CD+DVD	Avex Taiwan

== Certifications ==
Region	Certification	Certified units/sales
Japan (RIAJ)	Gold	100,000^{^}
^{^} Shipments figures based on certification alone.
