= F.T. Island discography =

Discography

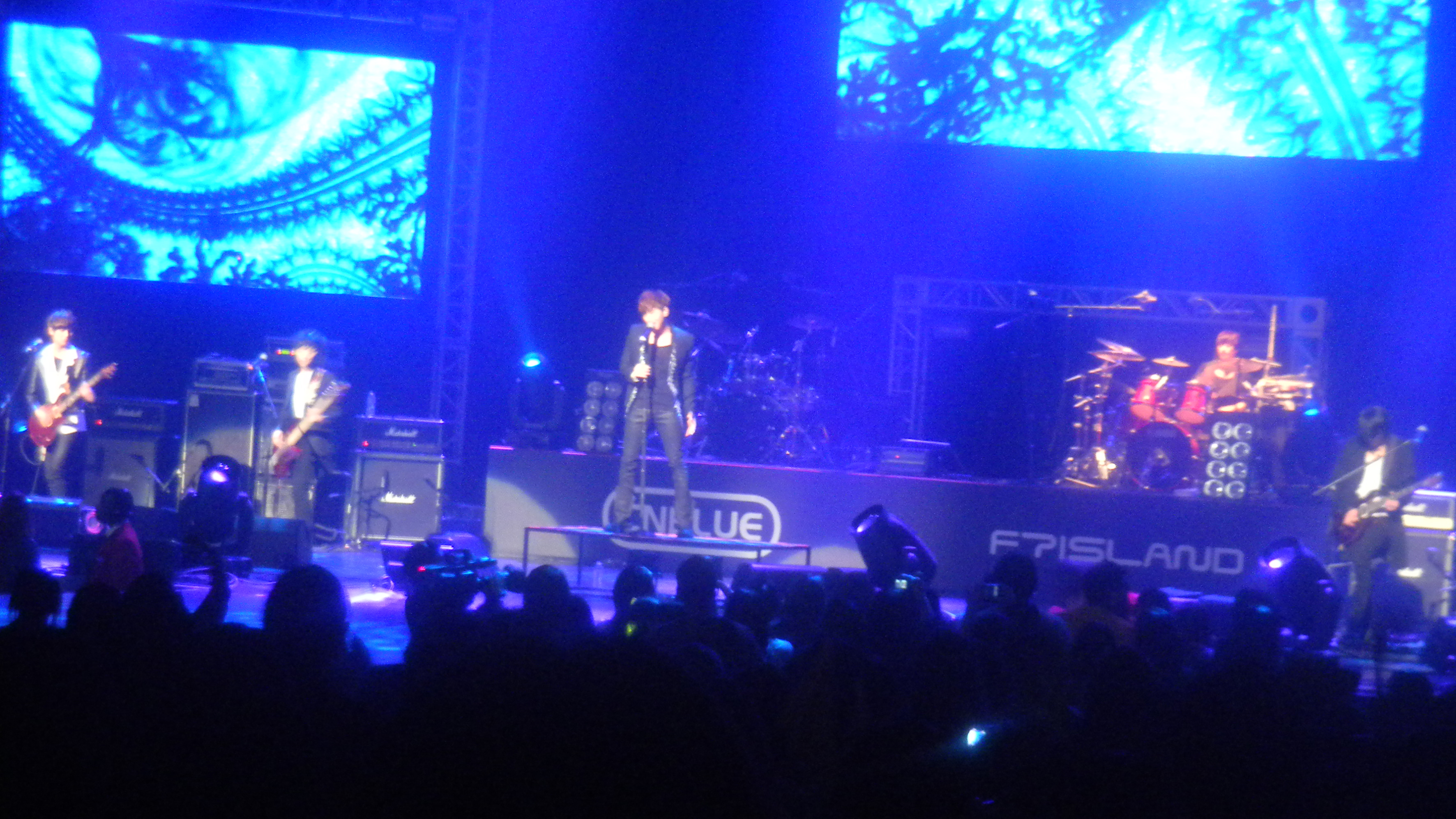
- Studio albums: 21
- Extended plays: 11
- Soundtrack albums: 17
- Compilation albums: 4
- Singles: 36
- Video albums: 11
- Music videos: 54
- Repackage studio albums: 2

This is the discography of South Korean rock band F.T. Island. They debuted in 2007 with Cheerful Sensibility.

== Albums ==
=== Studio albums ===
List of studio albums, with selected details, chart positions, and sales
Title	Album details	Peak chart positions		Sales
Title	Album details	KOR	JPN	Sales
Korean
Cheerful Sensibility	Released: June 7, 2007; Label: FNC Music; Formats: CD, digital download	—	—	KOR: 83,000
Colorful Sensibility	Released: August 22, 2008; Label: FNC Music; Formats: CD, digital download	22	—	KOR: 40,000
Colorful Sensibility Part 2	Released: October 17, 2008; Label: FNC Music; Formats: CD, digital download	10	—	No data
Cross & Change	Released: July 16, 2009; Label: FNC Music; Formats: CD, digital download	38	—	No data
Five Treasure Box	Released: September 10, 2012; Label: FNC Entertainment; Formats: CD, digital download	1	—	KOR: 61,214
I Will	Released: March 23, 2015; Label: FNC Entertainment; Formats: CD, digital download	1	—	KOR: 47,893
Where's the Truth?	Released: July 18, 2016; Label: FNC Entertainment; Formats: CD, digital download	1	22	KOR: 41,440; JPN: 5,433
Over 10 Years	Released: June 7, 2017; Label: FNC Entertainment; Formats: CD, digital download	2	34	KOR: 30,750; JPN: 3,708
Serious	Released: July 10, 2024; Label: FNC Entertainment; Formats: CD, digital download	16	37	KOR: 23,319; JPN: 1,037
Japanese
So Long, Au Revoir	Released: December 16, 2009; Label: AI Entertainment; Formats: CD, digital download	—	95	No data
Japan Special Album Vol. 1	Released: April 15, 2010; Label: Warner Music Japan; Formats: CD, digital download	15	—	KOR: 8,069
Five Treasure Island	Released: May 18, 2011; Label: Warner Music Japan; Formats: CD, digital download	—	1	JPN: 46,870
20 (Twenty)	Released: May 16, 2012; Label: Warner Music Japan; Formats: CD, digital download	—	4	JPN: 44,603
Rated-FT	Released: June 5, 2013; Label: Warner Music Japan; Formats: CD, digital download	—	3	JPN: 36,857
New Page	Released: May 28, 2014; Label: Warner Music Japan; Formats: CD, digital download	—	6	JPN: 25,347
5.....Go	Released: May 13, 2015; Label: Warner Music Japan; Formats: CD, digital download	—	3	JPN: 30,986
N.W.U	Released: April 6, 2016; Label: Warner Music Japan; Formats: CD, digital download	—	3	JPN: 23,605
United Shadows	Released: April 12, 2017; Label: Warner Music Japan; Formats: CD, digital download	—	3	JPN: 20,365
Planet Bonds	Released: April 11, 2018; Label: Warner Music Japan; Formats: CD, digital download	—	5	JPN: 18,724
Everlasting	Released: March 27, 2019; Label: Warner Music Japan; Formats: CD, digital download	—	3	JPN: 22,114
Instinct	Released: September 17, 2025; Label: Warner Music Japan; Formats: CD, digital download	—	9	JPN: 8,562
"—" denotes releases that did not chart or were not released in that region.

=== Reissues ===
List of reissues, with selected details, chart positions, and sales
Title	Album details	Peak chart positions	Sales
Title	Album details	KOR	Sales
The Refreshment	Released: December 3, 2007; Label: FNC Music; Formats: CD, digital download	—	KOR: 40,000+
Double Date	Released: October 26, 2009; Label: FNC Music; Formats: CD, digital download	47	No data
"—" denotes releases that did not chart or were not released in that region.

=== Compilation albums ===
List of compilation albums, with selected details, chart positions, and sales
Title	Album details	Peak chart positions		Sales
Title	Album details	KOR	JPN	Sales
Best Recommendation For Japan – Our Favorite Korean Songs	Released: September 28, 2011 (JPN); Label: Warner Music Japan; Formats: CD, digital download	—	3	JPN: 31,194
The Singles Collection	Released: September 18, 2013 (JPN); Label: Warner Music Japan; Formats: CD, digital download	29	9	JPN: 14,582
Japan Best - All About	Released: October 2, 2014 (KOR); Label: FNC Entertainment; Formats: CD, digital download	1	—	KOR: 16,555
10th Anniversary All Time Best/Yellow [2010-2020]	Released: May 20, 2020 (JPN); Label: Warner Music Japan; Formats: CD, digital download	—	7	JPN: 8,888
"—" denotes releases that did not chart or were not released in that region.

=== Single albums ===
Title	Album details	Peak chart positions		Sales	Album
Title	Album details	JPN	KOR	Sales	Album
"The One"	Released: December 17, 2008 (JPN); Label: AI Entertainment; Track listing CD: 1. The One; 2. Live Like a Musical; 3. You'll be in my Heart; 4. The One (Instrumental); DVD: 1. The One (Promotion Video); 2. The One (Special Feature)	24	—		So Long, Au Revoir
"I Believe Myself"	Released: April 22, 2009 (JPN); Label: AI Entertainment; Track listing CD: 1. I Believe Myself; 2. TV Radio; 3. Moonlight Angel; DVD: 1. I Believe Myself (PV); 2. I Believe Myself (Making)	51	—		So Long, Au Revoir
"Raining"	Released: October 21, 2009 (JPN); Label: AI Entertainment; Track listing: 1. Raining; 2. Everything is Possible; 3. It's U	69	—		So Long, Au Revoir
"Flower Rock"	Released: May 19, 2010 (JPN); Label: Warner Music Japan; Track listing CD: 1. Flower Rock; 2. Revolution; 3. Wing; 4. Flower Rock (Instrumental); DVD: 1. Flower Rock (Music Video); 2. Flower Rock (Special Feature)	4	4	JPN: 13,913; KOR: 4,100	Five Treasure Island
"Brand-new Days"	Released: July 14, 2010 (JPN); Label: Warner Music Japan; Track listing CD: 1. Brand-new Days; 2. Music Life; 3. Treasure; 4. Brand-new Days(Instrumental); DVD: 1. Brand-new days (Music Video); 2. Brand-new days (Special Feature)	11	5	JPN: 12,286	Five Treasure Island
"So Today..."	Released: November 17, 2010 (JPN); Label: Warner Music Japan; Track listing CD: 1. So Today...; 2. Boom Boom Boom; 3. I Change for You; 4. So Today... (Instrumental); DVD: 1. So Today... (Music Video)	8	4	JPN: 27,842	Five Treasure Island
"Satisfaction"	Released: April 20, 2011 (JPN); Label: Warner Music Japan; Track listing CD: 1. Satisfaction; 2. Friends; 3. I want 4. Satisfaction (Instrumental); DVD Type A: 1. Satisfaction (Music Video); 2. Satisfaction (Special Feature); DVD Type B: 1. M-ON TV-Show Zensoku Zenshin! FTIsland's "Zensoku Zenshin! FTIsland SPECIAL" complete version & outtakes (M-ONレギュラー番組「全速前進! FTIsland」の完全版「全速前進! FTIsland SPECIAL」&未公開NG集)	2	—	JPN: 38,359	Five Treasure Island
"Let It Go!"	Released: July 27, 2011 (JPN); Label: Warner Music Japan; Track listing: 1. Let It Go!; 2. Dream Sky; 3. Someday; 4. Let It Go!(Instrumental)	4	—	JPN: 36,524	20 (Twenty)
"Distance"	Released: November 30, 2011 (JPN); Label: Warner Music Japan; Track listing CD: 1. Distance; 2. LIFE; 3. Venus; 4. Distance (Instrumental); DVD: 1. "SATISFACTION" (Tour 2011 Summer Final "Messenger" at BUDOKAN) MULTI ANGLE LIVE; 2. "Itsuka" (Tour 2011 Summer Final "Messenger" at BUDOKAN) MULTI ANGLE LIVE; 3. Distance (Music Video); 4. Distance (Special feature)	4	—	JPN: 42,497	20 (Twenty)
"Neverland"	Released: April 18, 2012 (JPN); Label: Warner Music Japan; Track listing CD: 1. Neverland; 2. Wanna Go; 3. Yuki; 4. Neverland (Instrumental); DVD: 1. Let It Go! (X'mas Live 2011 Winter's Night @Yokohama Arena multi angle); 2. "Distance" (X'mas Live 2011 Winter's Night @Yokohama Arena multi angle); 3. Neverland (Music Video); 4. Neverland (Special feature)	10	—	JPN: 30,500	20 (Twenty)
"Top Secret"	Released: August 8, 2012 (JPN); Label: Warner Music Japan; Track listing: 1. Top Secret; 2. Beloved; 3. Here; 4. Top Secret (Instrumental)	6	—	JPN: 34,000	Rated-FT
"Polar Star"	Released: November 28, 2012 (JPN); Label: Warner Music Japan; Track listing: 1. Polar Star; 2. Fallin' for You; 3. Beautiful World; 4. Polar Star (Instrumental)	4	—	JPN: 35,000	Rated-FT
"You Are My Life"	Released: March 27, 2013 (JPN); Label: Warner Music Japan; Track listing CD: 1. You Are My Life; 2. Come Into My Dream; 3. Beat It; 4. You Are My Life (Instrumental); DVD: 1. "You Are My Life" MV + Special Features (MV Making & Acoustic Event & MC); 2. Acoustic Live from "9th Single 「Polar Star」 Commemorative Event	5	—	JPN: 32,109	Rated-FT
"Shiawase Theory" (シアワセオリー)	Released: July 24, 2013 (JPN); Label: Warner Music Japan; Track listing: 1. Shiawase Theory; 2. Eyes On Me; 3. Rainy Days; 4. Shiawase Theory (Instrumental)	5	—	JPN: 26,131	New Page
"Beautiful"	Released: January 22, 2014 (JPN); Label: Warner Music Japan; Track listing: 1. Beautiful; 2. Another New World; 3. On My Way; 4. Beautiful (Instrumental)	8	—	JPN: 18,438	New Page
"Mitaiken Future" (未体験Future)	Released: April 2, 2014 (JPN); Label: Warner Music Japan; Track listing: 1. Mitaiken Future; 2. A Wish In This Song; 3. Born To Be A Rock'N Roller; 4. Mitaiken Future (Instrumental); 5. A Wish In This Song (Instrumental); 6. Born To Be A Rock'N Roller (Instrumental)	5	—	JPN: 24,097	New Page
"To the Light"	Released: October 15, 2014 (JPN); Label: Warner Music Japan; Track listing: 1. To The Light; 2. Tornado; 3. FISH; 4. To The Light (Instrumental); 5. Tornado (Instrumental); 6. FISH (Instrumental)	8	—	JPN: 23,364	5.....Go
"Puppy"	Released: September 16, 2015 (JPN); Label: Warner Music Japan; Track listing: 1. Puppy; 2. Cycle; 3. Parallel World (パラレルワールド); 4. Puppy (Instrumental); 5. Cycle (Instrumental); 6. Parallel World (パラレルワールド) (Instrumental)	3	—	JPN: 40,892	N.W.U
"Just Do It"	Released: August 17, 2016 (JPN); Label: Warner Music Japan; Track listing: 1. JUST DO IT; 2. I'll be there 3. EMPTINESS; 4. YOU DON'T KNOW WHO I AM	8	—	JPN: 22,104	United Shadows
"Paradise"	Released: August 23, 2017 (JPN); Label: Warner Music Japan; Track listing: 1. Paradise; 2. Stay what you are 3. What about me?	5	—	JPN: 19,211	Planet Bonds
"Pretty Girl"	Released: August 22, 2018 (JPN); Label: Warner Music Japan; Track listing: 1. Pretty Girl; 2. Remember; 3. Break It Down	10	—	JPN: 18,116	—
"Door"	Released: September 21, 2022 (JPN); Label: Warner Music Japan; Track listing: 1. Door; 2. Scarlet; 3. In the Room	10	—	JPN: 8,618	—
"—" denotes releases that did not chart or were not released in that region.

== Extended plays ==
Title	EP details	Peak chart positions		Sales
Title	EP details	KOR	JPN	Sales
Korean
Jump Up	Released: February 11, 2009; Label: FNC Music; Formats: CD, digital download	9	—	No data
Beautiful Journey	Released: August 25, 2010; Label: FNC Music; Formats: CD, digital download	2	—	KOR: 60,166
Return	Released: May 24, 2011; Label: FNC Music; Formats: CD, digital download	1	—	KOR: 58,243
Memory in FTIsland	Released: October 10, 2011; Label: FNC Music; Formats: CD, digital download	2	—	KOR: 39,389
Grown-Up	Released: January 31, 2012; Label: FNC Music; Formats: CD, digital download	1	—	KOR: 60,891
Thanks To	Released: September 23, 2013; Label: FNC Entertainment; Formats: CD, digital download	2	—	KOR: 34,249
The Mood	Released: November 18, 2013; Label: FNC Entertainment; Formats: CD, digital download	1	—	KOR: 36,393
What If	Released: July 26, 2018; Label: FNC Entertainment; Formats: CD, digital download	4	28	KOR: 23,903; JPN: 2,036
Zapping	Released: September 9, 2019; Label: FNC Entertainment; Formats: CD, digital download, streaming	2	20	KOR: 22,632; JPN: 2,459
Lock Up	Released: December 10, 2021; Label: FNC Entertainment; Formats: CD, digital download, streaming	12	30	KOR: 17,131; JPN: 1,824
Sage	Released: September 7, 2023; Label: FNC Entertainment; Formats: CD, digital download, streaming	8	43	KOR: 18,244; JPN: 796
Japanese
Prologue of F.T. Island: Soyogi	Released: June 7, 2008; Label: AI Entertainment; Formats: CD, digital download	—	124	No data
"—" denotes releases that did not chart or were not released in that region.

== Singles ==
Title	Year	Peak chart positions	Sales	Album
Title	Year	KOR	Sales	Album
"Lovesick" (사랑앓이)	2007	—	—N/a	Cheerful Sensibility
"Thunder" (천둥)	2007	—	—N/a	Cheerful Sensibility
"Until You Come Back" (너 올때까지)	2007	—	—N/a	The Refreshment
"After Love" (사랑후애)	2008	—	—N/a	Colorful Sensibility
"Heaven"	2008	—	—N/a	Colorful Sensibility Part 2
"Bad Woman" (나쁜 여자야)	2009	—	—N/a	Jump Up
"I Hope" (바래)	2009	—	—N/a	Cross & Change
"Love Letter" (러브레터) (as F.T. Triple)	2009	—	—N/a	Double Date
"Love Love Love" (사랑사랑사랑)	2010	1	KOR: 1,781,877	Beautiful Journey
"Hello Hello"	2011	6	KOR: 1,642,170	Return
"Like Birds" (새들처럼)	2011	20	KOR: 816,425	Memory In FTIsland
"Severely" (지독하게)	2012	3	KOR: 2,291,448	Grown-Up
"I Wish" (좋겠어)	2012	8	KOR: 1,028,862	Five Treasure Box
"Memory"	2013	17	KOR: 125,347	Thanks To
"Madly" (미치도록)	2013	15	KOR: 157,407	The Mood
"To the Light"	2015	84		I Will
"Pray"	2015	21	KOR: 59,736	I Will
"Take Me Now"	2016	102	KOR: 25,611	Where's the Truth?
"Lovesick" (사랑앓이) (with Kim Na-young)	2017	18	KOR: 401,284	Over 10 Years
"Wind"	2017	67	KOR: 31,985	Over 10 Years
"Summer Night's Dream" (여름밤의 꿈)	2018	— (Note: "Summer Night's Dream" did not enter the Circle Digital Chart, but peaked at number 44 on the component Download Chart.)	—N/a	What If
"Quit" (관둬)	2019	93	—N/a	Zapping
"Unthinkable" (말이 안 돼)	2021	131	—N/a	Lock Up
"Sage"	2023	— (Note: "Sage" did not enter the Circle Digital Chart, but peaked at number 43 on the component Download Chart.)	—N/a	Sage
"Burn It"	2024	— (Note: "Burn It" did not enter the Circle Digital Chart, but peaked at number 45 on the component Download Chart.)	—N/a	Serious
"Serious"	2024	—	—N/a	Serious
"—" denotes releases that did not chart or were not released in that region.

== Soundtrack appearances ==
Title	Year	Album
"I Think I Saw Love" (사랑을 보았나봐)	2007	In-soon Is Pretty OST
"One Word" (한가지 말)	2008	On Air OST
"Don't You Know?" (모르시죠) (as FT Triple)	2010	Master of Study OST
"Haruka" (ハルカ)	2011	Muscle Girl! OST
"Itsuka" (いつか)	2011	Muscle Girl! OST
"Even If It's Not Necessary.." (꼭은 아니더라도..)	2011	Heartstrings OST

== Videography ==
Year	Album	Music Video	Length	Notes
2007	Cheerful Sensibility	"I Am Happy"	3:42	Feat. Choshinsung's Jung Yoon-hak & Song Ji-hyuk
2007	Cheerful Sensibility	"Lovesick"	4:08	Debut song, feat. T-ARA's Eunjung, Choshinsung's Kim Kwang-su, Park Geon-il, Song Ji-hyuk & Kim Sung-je
2007	Cheerful Sensibility	"FT Island"	3:46	-
2007	Cheerful Sensibility	"Thunder" & "Only One Person"	9:23	Feat. T-ARA's Eunjung, actress Min Hyo-rin & Jung So Young
2007	Cheerful Sensibility	"A Man's First Love Follows Him to the Grave" & "Only One Person"	7:42	Feat. T-ARA's Eunjung, actress Min Hyo-rin & Jung So Young
2007	Insooni is Pretty OST	"I Think I Saw Love"	3:47	-
2007	The Refreshment	"Until You Come Back" & "A Person Who's Closer To Tears"	7:39	-
2008	On Air OST	"One Word"	4:27	-
2008	Love Song 2008	"Tears are Falling (FT Island Ver.)"	1:30	-
2008	Prologue of FT Island - soyogi	"Friendship"	4:22	-
2008	Prologue of FT Island - soyogi	"Soyogi"	5:11	-
2008	Colorful Sensibility	"After Love"	4:32	-
2008	Colorful Sensibility	"Girls Don't Know"	4:15	Unreleased
2008	Colorful Sensibility Part 2	"Heaven" & "Love Is..."	8:19	Feat. T-ARA's Hyomin, actress Kang Jung Hwa
2008	Colorful Sensibility Part 2	"Heaven"	6:33	Feat. T-ARA's Hyomin, actress Kang Jung Hwa
2009	Jump Up	"Bad Woman"	3:59	Feat. actress Seo Hyo-rim
2009	Jump Up	"Missing U"	3:37	-
2009	Cross & Change	"I Hope"	4:53	-
2009	Double Date	"Love Letter"	4:01	-
2009	So Long, Au Revoir	"Raining"	5:04	-
2010	Flower Rock	"Flower Rock"	4:14	-
2010	Brand-New Days	"Brand New Days"	4:28	-
2010	Brand-New Days	"Treasure"	4:51	-
2010	Beautiful Journey	"Love Love Love"	4:03	-
2010	So Today...	"So Today..."	4:07	-
2011	Five Treasure Island	"Haruka"	4:16	-
2011	Return	"Hello Hello"	4:08	-
2011	Satisfaction	"Satisfaction"	4:08	-
2011	Let it go!	"Let it go!"	3:42	-
2011	Memory In FT Island	"Like Birds"	3:30	-
2011	Distance	"Distance"	5:16	-
2012	Grown-Up	"Severely"	6:48	Feat. AOA Seolhyun
2012	Neverland	"Neverland"	3:57	-
2012	20 (Twenty)	"Stay"	4:23	-
2012	Top Secret	"Top Secret"	3:59	-
2012	Five Treasure Box	"I Wish"	3:40	Feat. AOA Hyejeong
2012	Polar Star	"Polar Star"	4:03	-
2013	You Are My Life	"You Are My Life"	3:52	-
2013	Rated-FT	"Freedom"	3:42	-
2013	Rated-FT	Orange Sky	4:54	-
2013	Thanks To	"Memory"	3:21	-
2013	The Mood	"Madly"	4:21	Feat. Gugudan Jung Mimi (then FNC trainee)
2014	New Page	"Beautiful"	5:22	-
2014	New Page	"Mitaiken Future"	3:43	-
2014	New Page	"Be Free"	3:54	-
2014	To The Light	"To The Light"	3:42	Japanese ver.
2015	I WILL	"To The Light"	4:00	Korean ver.
2015	I WILL	"Pray"	4:20	-
2015	5.....Go	"Primavera"	4:38	-
2015	Where Is My Puppy	"Puppy"	3:43	-
2016	N.W.U	"You Don't Know Who I Am"	3:30	-
2016	Where's the Truth?	"Take Me Now"	4:30	-
2016	United Shadows	"Just Do It"	4:27	-
2017	United Shadows	"Shadows"	4:18	-
2017	Over 10 Years	"Lovesick"	4:40	Feat. Kim Na-young
2017	Over 10 Years	"Wind"	5:05	-
2017	Planet Bonds	"Paradise"	4:11	-
2018	Planet Bonds	"Hold The Moon"	4:36	-
2018	Everlasting	"Pretty Girl"	4:26	-
2018	Everlasting	"God bless you"	4:02	-
