= List of awards and nominations received by F.T. Island =

- Major Awards
| Award | Wins | Nominations |
| Golden Disk Awards | 7 | 7 |
| Seoul Music Awards | 3 | 3 |
| Mnet Asian Music Awards | 2 | 14 |
| Asia Song Festival | 1 | 1 |
| Mnet 20's Choice Awards | 0 | 1 |
- Totals
| Awards won | 13 |
| Nominations | 21 |
- References
- Music Show Wins
- Music Show: Wins
- Inkigayo: 7
- M! Countdown: 7
- Music Bank: 4
- Show Champion: 1
- The Show: 3
- Show! Music on Top: 3
- Music Shows Totals Wins
| Wins | 25 |
- References

This is a list of awards and nominations received by South Korean five-member pop rock band F.T. Island, short for Five Treasure Island. The members are

- Choi Min-hwan on drums,
- Lee Hong-gi as main vocals, and
- Lee Jae-jin on bass

under FNC Entertainment.

Former members were Song Seung-hyun (2009-2019) on guitar, Oh Won-bin (2007-2009) on guitar, and Choi Jong-hoon (2007-2019) on guitar and keyboard.

== Mnet Asian Music Awards ==
The Mnet Asian Music Awards (abbreviated as a MAMA), formerly "M.net KM Music Festival" (MKMF) (1999 - 2008), is a major K-pop music award show that is held by Mnet Media annually in South Korea. Daesang Award (Grand Prize) is equivalent Artist of the Year.

| Year | Award | Nomination | Result | Ref |
|---|---|---|---|---|
| 2007 | Best New Male Group | "Love Sick" | Won | |
| 2007 | MNet.com Award | "Love Sick" | Won | |
| 2008 | Best Male Group | "After Love" | Nominated | |
| 2008 | Best OST | "One Word" | Nominated | |
| 2009 | Best Rock Performance | "I Wish" | Nominated | |
| 2010 | Best Band Performance | "Love Love Love" | Nominated | |
| 2011 | Best Band Performance | "Hello Hello" | Nominated | |
| 2012 | Best Band Performance | "Severely" | Nominated | |
| 2012 | Song of the Year | "Severely" | Nominated | |
| 2014 | Best Band Performance | "Madly" | Nominated | |
| 2015 | Best Band Performance | "Pray" | Nominated | |
| 2015 | Song of the Year | "Pray" | Nominated | |
| 2016 | Best Band Performance | "Take Me Now" | Nominated | |
| 2016 | Song of the Year | "Take Me Now" | Nominated | |

== Mnet 20's Choice Awards ==
Mnet 20's Choice Awards is presented by South Korean cable television channel Mnet.

| Year | Category | Nomination | Result | Ref |
|---|---|---|---|---|
| 2012 | 20's Trendy Music | F.T. Island | Nominated | |

== Golden Disk Awards ==
| Year | Nominee/Work | Award | Result |
|---|---|---|---|
| 2007 | "Love Sick" | Popularity Award | Won |
| 2007 | "Love Sick" | Newcomer Award | Won |
| 2008 | F.T. Island | YEPP Popularity Award | Won |
| 2010 | "Love Love Love" | Cosmopolitan Rock Music Award | Won |
| 2011 | F.T. Island | Cosmopolitan ‘Fun & Fearless Musician’ Award | Won |
| 2011 | F.T. Island | Best Rock Musician of the Year | Won |
| 2013 | "Severely" | Disk Bonsang | Won |

== MBC Plus X Genie Music Awards ==
| Year | Nominee/Work | Award | Result |
|---|---|---|---|
| 2018 | Song of the Year | "Summer Night’s Dream" | Nominated |
| 2018 | Band Music Award | "Summer Night’s Dream" | Nominated |
| 2018 | Genie Music Popularity Award | F.T. Island | Nominated |

== Awards by year ==
| Year | Awards |
|---|---|
| 2007 | 2007 Blistex's World's Most Beautiful Lips Award (first winner in Asia); Asia Song Festival: Best New Asian Artist; 22nd Golden Disk Awards: Popularity Award; 22nd Golden Disk Awards: Newcomer Award |
| 2008 | 17th Seoul Music Awards: Newcomer Award (Love Sick); 2008 SEED Awards : Asia's Most Popular Artist Award (Thailand); 15th Annual Republic of Korea Entertainment Arts Awards: Best Male Grup; 23rd Golden Disk Awards : YEPP Popularity Award |
| 2009 | 17th Korean Cultural Entertainment Awards:Teen Musical Artist Award; 2009 Hallyu Tourism Night, Korea National Tourism Organization: Hallyu Tourism Lifetime Achievement Award |
| 2010 | 16th Annual Republic of Korea Entertainment Arts Awards: Male Singer Award; 25th Golden Disk Awards: Cosmopolitan Rock Music Award |
| 2011 | 20th Seoul Music Awards: Bonsang Award; MBC Idol Star 7080: King Singer Award; 26th Golden Disk Awards: Cosmopolitan ‘Fun & Fearless Musician’ Award; 26th Golden Disk Awards: Best Rock Musician of the Year |
| 2012 | 21st Seoul Music Awards: Bonsang Award |
| 2013 | 27th Golden Disk Awards: Disk Bonsang |
| 2015 | Asia's Popular Band Award |
