= Kyung Hee Cyber University =

South Korean cyber university

Coordinates: 37.5948°N 127.0531°E

- Motto: "학원의 민주화, 사상의 민주화, 생활의 민주화"
- Motto in English: "Democratization of school, democratization of thought, democratization of living"
- Type: Private
- Established: March 3, 2001
- President: Chankg-Ku Byun
- Undergraduates: 12,000
- Postgraduates: 5,700
- Location: Seoul, South Korea
- Campus: Urban
- Language: Korean and English
- Colors: Crimson
- Mascot: Laughing Lion
- Website: www.khcu.ac.kr(Korean), khcu.ac.kr/en/(English)

Korean name
- Hangul: 경희사이버대학교
- Hanja: 慶熙사이버大學校
- RR: Gyeonghui saibeo daehakgyo
- MR: Kyŏnghŭi saibŏ taehakkyo

Kyung Hee Cyber University (abbreviated to KHCU; Korean: 경희사이버대학교) is a virtual, South Korean higher education institution that offers online bachelor's and master's degree programs. Founded in 2001, it has been recognized as the first cyber university in South Korea by both the Ministry of Education and the Korea Management Association.

Kyung Hee Cyber University is part of the Kyung Hee University System which offers comprehensive education from kindergarten through graduate school. The cyber university along with the programs it offers were constructed based on the tradition and knowledge of Kyung Hee University (KHC), a private higher education institution with over 70 years of history and expertise.

== History ==
Kyung Hee Cyber University was established on March 3, 2001 as the first online initiative by the Kyung Hee University System.

In 2018, Kyung Hee Cyber University was awarded the grand prize in online education at the 2018 Korea Customer Satisfaction & Power Brand Awards.

== Academics ==
=== Departments ===
- The School of Integrated Software and Design
- Future Human Science School
- Healthcare & Oriental Medicine
- Humanitas
- Social Welfare
- Art Sports
- International Languages/Cultures
- Culture and Communication
- Business Management
- Finance and Real Estate
- Hospitality/Tourism/Food Service
- Liberal Arts

== Overseas culture tour ==
Kyung Hee Cyber University currently has 38 partner universities or institutions throughout Asia, 14 in North America, five in South America, five in Oceania, six in Europe, and four international alliances.

== Notable alumni ==
As the Korean entertainment industry often provides both inconsistent and long schedules, South Korean singers, actors, and actresses have enrolled into cyber university as an alternative that does not limit them to a specific time or space.

The singers, actors, and actresses that have graduated from Kyung Hee Cyber University or are still enrolled include:

- Bang Yong-guk (B.A.P)
- Baekhyun (Exo)
- Cha Hun (N.Flying)
- Cho Kyuhyun (Super Junior)
- Choi Min-hwan (F.T. Island)
- Choi Sung-bong
- Doh Kyungsoo (Exo)
- Han Eun-jung
- Heo Sol-ji (EXID)
- Im Changkyun (Monsta X)
- Jang Hee-jin
- Jung Yong-hwa (CNBLUE)
- Kang Daniel
- Kang Min-hyuk (CNBLUE)
- Kim Hyung-jun (SS501)
- Kim Jaehyun (N.Flying)
- Kim Jongdae (Exo)
- Kim Junmyeon (Exo)
- Kim Kyu-jong (SS501)
- Heo Young Saeng (SS501)
- Lee Dong-gun
- Lee Hong-gi (F.T. Island)
- Lee Jae-jin (F.T. Island)
- Lee Jong-hyun (CNBLUE)
- Lee Joon (MBLAQ)
- Lee Jung-shin (CNBLUE)
- Mir (MBLAQ)
- Oh Jong-hyuk (Click-B)
- Kang-Hoo (Click-B)
- Woo Yun-Suk (Click-B)
- Park Chanyeol (Exo)
- Park Yoo-chun (JYJ)
- Song Seung-hyun (F.T. Island)
- Yang Seung-ho (MBLAQ)
- Yoo Taeyang (SF9)
- Yoon Doo-joon (Highlight)
- Yoon Eun-hye (Baby V.O.X)
