= Ji Seung-hyun =

Ji Seung-hyun (Korean: 지승현) is a Korean name consisting of the family name Ji and the given name Seung-hyun, and may also refer to:

- Ji Seung-hyun (handballer) (born 1979), South Korean handballer
- Ji Seung-hyun (actor) (born 1981), South Korean actor
