= JHI =

Jhi or JHI may refer to:

- Jahai language
- James Hutton Institute
- Jewish Historical Institute
- Jhi Yeon-woo (born 1984), South Korean bodybuilder
- Ji (Korean name), a Korean family name
- Jim Henson Interactive
- Journal of the History of Ideas
