= Five Treasure Island =

Studio album by F.T. Island
- Released: May 18, 2011
- Genre: Rock
- Language: Japanese
- Label: Warner Music Japan

F.T. Island chronology
Beautiful Journey (2010)	Five Treasure Island (2011)	Return (2011)

Singles from Five Treasure Island
- 1. "Flower Rock" Released: May 19, 2010; 2. "Brand New Days" Released: July 14, 2010; 3. "So Today..." Released: November 17, 2010; 4. "Satisfaction" Released: April 20, 2011

Five Treasure Island is the first major label Japanese-language studio album by South Korean rock band F.T. Island, released by Warner Music Japan on 18 May 2011. The album placed first on the Oricon daily chart.

== Track listing ==
No.	Title	Lyrics	Music	Length
1.	"Flower Rock"	Kaji Katsura, Lee Hong-gi, Lee Jae-jin, Song Seung-hyun	corin.	04:08
2.	"Satisfaction"	Junji Ishiwatari (いしわたり淳治)	Hiroki Horiko (堀向彦輝)	04:08
3.	"ハルカ Haruka"	Kenn Kato	Jeff Miyahara, Hayashida Hiroichi (林田裕一)	:04:14
4.	"Brand-new days"	Song Seung-hyeon, Hisashi Kondo (近藤ひさし)	Masanori Takumi (宅見将典)	04:24
5.	"mi･ra･i"	Kenn Kato	Song Seung-hyeon, Choi Min-hwan	04:13
6.	"いつか Itsuka"	Junji Ishiwatari	Ryosuke Shigenaga (重永亮介)	05:09
7.	"So today..."	Lee Jae-jin, Nakamura Kanata	corin.	04:05
8.	"yume"	Kenn Kato	Lee Jae-jin	05:15
9.	"Rock'n'roll"	Kenn Kato	Lee Jae-jin	04:31
10.	"Boom Boom Boom"	Lee Jae-jin, Hisashi Kondo	Choi Jong-hoon, Hisashi Kondo	03:38
11.	"Music Life"	Choi Jong-hoon, Hisashi Kondo	Choi Jong-hoon, Shôtarô Kobayashi (小林聖太郎)	02:46
12.	"Friends"	Lee Jae-jin, Hisashi Kondo	Choi Jong-hoon, Shôtarô Kobayashi	03:14
13.	"Treasure"	Yoshiyasu Ichikawa (市川喜康)	Yoshiyasu Ichikawa	04:45
