= Thanks To =

EP by F.T. Island
- Released: September 23, 2013
- Recorded: 2013
- Genre: Rock, pop rock
- Language: Korean
- Label: FNC Entertainment; CJ E&M

F.T. Island chronology
The Singles Collection (2013)	Thanks To (2013)	The Mood (2013)

Singles from Thanks To
- 1. "Memory" Released: September 23, 2013

Thanks To is a Korean-language EP by South Korean rock band F.T. Island, released on 23 September 2013 by FNC Entertainment. Several of the songs were composed by the band members. Memory reached first place on the Taiwanese Qmusic Chart, while the EP itself was placed first on the G-MUSIC weekly chart, with a 28,84% share among Asian releases. The band first played the songs from Thanks To during their FTHX concerts in Seoul on 28 and 29 September, drawing an audience of 6,000.

== Track listing ==
No.	Title	Lyrics	Music	Length
1.	"Memory"	Lee Hong-gi, Han Seong-ho, R307	Lee Hong-gi, R307	03:15
2.	"Falling Star"	Lee Jae-jin, Lee Hui-seung, Vinyl House	Lee Jae-jin, Vinyl House	03:12
3.	"Try Again"	Choi Jong-hoon, Lee Hui-seung	Choi Jong-hoon	03:10
4.	"Always With You"	Lee Hong-gi, Han Seung-hun	Lee Hong-gi Han Seung-hun	03:31
5.	"Memory" (Instrumental)		Lee Hong-gi, R307	03:15
