= The Mood (EP) =

EP by F.T. Island
- Released: November 18, 2013
- Recorded: 2013
- Genre: Rock
- Label: FNC Music, Mnet Media

F.T. Island chronology
Thanks To (2013)	The Mood (2013)	New Page (2014)

Singles from The Mood
- 1. "미치도록 (Madly)" Released: November 18, 2013

The Mood is the fifth mini album by South Korean rock band F.T. Island. It was released in South Korea on November 18, 2013, by FNC Music and distributed by Mnet Media. It features the song "Madly", a rock ballad. Members Choi Jong-hoon, Lee Jae-jin, and Lee Hong-gi each composed a song for the album. The record placed first on Hanteo's weekly album chart, as well as on Gaon Chart. Preorders of the album lead the HMV online chart in Japan.

== Track list ==
No.	Title	Lyrics	Music	Length
1.	"미치도록 Michidorok" (Madly)	Han Seong-ho	Twoface, Lee Sang-ho	04:11
2.	"가질 수 없는 너 Kajil su omneun neo" (Can't Have You)	Choi Jong-hun	Choi Jong-hun, Han Seung-hun	03:13
3.	"The Way Into You"	Lee Jae-jin, Sin Min-gyu	Lee Jae-jin, Sin Min-gyu	03:25
4.	"Siren"	Lee Hong-gi, Ari, R307	Lee Hong-gi, R307	03:32
