= Beautiful Journey =

EP by F.T. Island
- Released: August 25, 2010
- Recorded: 2010
- Genre: pop-rock
- Label: FNC Entertainment, KT Music Co., Ltd.

F.T. Island chronology
Japan Special Album Vol. 1 (2010)	Beautiful Journey (2010)	Five Treasure Island (2011)

Singles from Beautiful Journey
- 1. "사랑사랑사랑 (Love, Love, Love)" Released: 25 August 2010

Beautiful Journey is a Korean language EP by South Korean band F.T. Island, released on August 25, 2010. The album contains 5 songs, a music video was shot for the title song "Love, Love, Love".

== Track list ==
No.	Title	Lyrics	Music	Length
1.	"사랑사랑사랑 Sarang, sarang, sarang" (Love, Love, Love)	Kim Do-hun, Lee Sang-ho, Mario	Kim Do-hun, Lee Sang-ho	03:53
2.	"굳은 살이 박혀버려... Gudeun sari bakhyeobeoryeo" (Calluses Being Stuck)	Han Seong-ho	Han Seung-hun	03:31
3.	"Baby Love"	Han Seong-ho	Han Seong-ho, Kim Jae-yang	03:36
4.	"미친 듯이 너 하나만 Michin deusi neo hanaman" (Crazily Looking Only at You)	Han Seong-ho	Kim Jae-yang	03:50
5.	"돈키호테의 노래 Donkihoteui norae" (Don Quixote’s Song)	Han Seong-ho, Han Gyeong-hye, Kim Hae-gyeong, Han Seung-hun	Han Seung-hun, Choi Jong-hoon	03:27
