= Seung-hyun =

- Hangul: 승현
- RR: Seunghyeon
- MR: Sŭnghyŏn
- IPA: [sɯŋçʌn]

Seung-hyun, also spelled Seung-hyeon, or Seung-hyon, Sung-hyon, is a Korean given name. It was the 10th-most popular name for baby boys in South Korea in 1990 (see List of the most popular given names in South Korea).

People with this name include:

== Entertainers ==
- Baek Seung-hyeon (born 1975), South Korean actor
- Ji Seung-hyun (actor) (born 1981), South Korean actor
- Stephen Seung-hyun Sohn (born 1986), American model of Korean descent
- Choi Seung-hyun (born 1987), stage name T.O.P, South Korean male rapper, member of Big Bang
- Kang Seung-hyun (born 1987), South Korean female model
- Lee Seung-hyun (born 1990), stage name Seungri, South Korean male singer, former member of Big Bang
- Song Seung-hyun (born 1992), South Korean male guitarist and singer, member of rock band F.T. Island
- Goo Seung-hyun (born 2004), South Korean actor
- Choi Seung-hyun, South Korean film score composer

== Sportspeople ==
- Ji Seung-hyun (handballer) (born 1979), South Korean male handball player
- Kim Seung-hyun (footballer) (born 1979), South Korean male football midfielder and forward
- You Seung-hun (born 1983), South Korean male swimmer
- Lee Seung-hyun (footballer) (born 1985), South Korean male football winger
- Yoon Seung-hyeon (born 1988), South Korean male football winger
- Lee Seoung-hyun (born 1992), South Korean male basketball player
- Yun Seung-hyun (born 1994), South Korean high jumper
- Hong Seung-hyun (born 1996), South Korean male football forward

== Other ==
- Park Seung-hyun (born 1984), South Korean male Go player

== See also ==
- List of Korean given names
