= Madly =

Madly may refer to:

- The Love Mates, or Madly, a 1970 French romance film
- Madly (2016 film), an English-language international anthology film
- Madly (2025 film), an Italian romantic comedy film
- "Madly", a song by F.T. Island from the EP The Mood
