= Colorful Sensibility Part 2 =

EP by F.T. Island
- Released: October 17, 2008
- Recorded: 2008
- Genre: pop-rock
- Labels: FNC Entertainment, CJ E&M

F.T. Island chronology
Colorful Sensibility (2008)	Colorful Sensibility Part 2 (2008)	Jump Up (EP) (2009)

Singles from Colorful Sensibility Part 2
- 1. "HEAVEN + 너를 사랑해 (Heaven+Love Is)" Released: 2008

Colorful Sensibility Part 2 is the follow-up album of Colorful Sensibility by South Korean band F.T. Island, released on October 17, 2008, two months after the main album.

== Track list ==
No.	Title	Lyrics	Music	Length
1.	"너를 사랑해 Neoreul saranghae" (Loving You)	An Yeong-min	Jo Yeong-su (조영수)	03:29
2.	"Heaven"	An Yeong-min	Jo Yeong-su (조영수)	03:45
3.	"너의 안부를 물을 때 Neoui anbureul mureul ddae" (When I Am Asking About Your Well-Being)	Han Seong-ho	Han Seung-hun, Kim Jae-yang	04:16
4.	"바램 Baraem" (Prayer)	Han Seong-ho	Han Seong-ho	04:01
5.	"내 오랜 그녀와 해야 할 일 Nae oraen geunyeowa haeya hal il" (The Thing I Should Have Continued With Her)	Lee Hui-seung	Han Seung-hun, Kim Jae-yang	04:02
6.	"그대는 사랑입니다 Geudeneun saranghamnida (Remix)" (You Are Love)	Han Seong-ho	Han Seong-ho	04:41
