= So Today... =

- CD-only cover

Single by F.T. Island

from the album Five Treasure Island
- Released: November 17, 2010
- Recorded: 2010
- Genre: Rock
- Length: 4:30
- Label: Warner Music Japan
- Songwriters: Kanata Nakamura, Lee Jae-jin

F.T. Island Japanese singles chronology
| "Brand-New Days" (2010) | "So Today..." (2010) | "Satisfaction" (2011) |

"So Today..." is a song by South Korean rock band F.T. Island. It is their third single under Warner Music Japan and sixth single overall in Japan, and is included on their second Japanese studio album Five Treasure Island. The song was written by Kanata Nakamura and Lee Jae-jin, and composed by Corin. It was released on November 17, 2010, in three editions: a CD-only edition, and limited editions A and B. The single debuted at number eight on the Oricon weekly singles chart, selling over 27,000 copies in its first week.

== Composition ==
"So Today..." was written by Kanata Nakamura and Lee Jae-jin, composed by Corin, and arranged by Jin and Corin. "Boom Boom Boom" was written by Hisashi Kondo and Lee, composed by Choi Jong-hoon and Kondo, and arranged by F.T. Island and Yu Odakura. "I Change for You" was written by Lee and Kondo, composed by Shinya Sumida, and arranged by Ryo Eguchi.

== Release and promotion ==
"So Today..." was released on November 17, 2010, in three editions: a CD-only edition which includes one of seven random trading cards; a limited edition A which includes the music video of the song; and a limited edition B which includes one of five figurines of the members of the band.

== Chart performance ==
"So Today..." debuted at number eight on the Oricon weekly singles chart, selling 27,842 copies in its first week. The single charted for eight weeks on the chart. On the issue dated November 29, 2010, the song debuted at number 31 on the Billboard Japan Hot 100.

== Track listing ==
All editions:
| No. | Title | Lyrics | Music | Length |
|---|---|---|---|---|
| 1. | "So Today..." | Kanata Nakamura, Lee Jae-jin | Corin | 4:30 |
| 2. | "Boom Boom Boom" | Hisashi Kondo, Lee | Choi Jong-hoon, Kondo | 3:40 |
| 3. | "I Change for You" | Lee, Kondo | Shinya Sumida | 3:51 |
| 4. | "So Today..." (Instrumental) | | Corin | 4:30 |
| Total length: | | | | 16:31 |

Limited edition A
| No. | Title | Length |
|---|---|---|
| 1. | "Satisfaction" (music video) |

== Chart history ==
| Chart (2011) | Peak position |
|---|---|
| Billboard Japan Hot 100 | 31 |
| Oricon Weekly Chart | 8 |
