= 5.....Go =

5.....GO

Studio album by F.T. Island
- Released: May 13, 2015
- Recorded: 2015
- Length: 46:17
- Label: Warner Music Japan

F.T. Island chronology
I Will (2015)	5.....GO (2015)	N.W.U (2016)

Singles from 5.....Go
- 1. "Primavera" Released: April 17, 2015

5.....GO is an album by South Korean rock band F.T. Island. It was released on 13 May 2015. The album was released to celebrate the band's fifth anniversary in Japan. The title track "Primavera" is a collaboration with Japanese rock singer Takahiro Moriuchi from One Ok Rock.

== Track list ==
No.	Title	Lyrics	Music	Length
1.	"To The Light"	Lee Jae-Jin, Lee Hong-Ki	Lee Jae-Jin, Heaven Light	3:41
2.	"Primavera"	Lee Hong-Ki	FTISLAND, Taka	4:40
3.	"Orange Days"	MOTHBALL	MOTHBALL	3:42
4.	"YES or NO"	Song Seung-Hyun, Kenn Kato	Choi Jong-Hoon, Park Woo	3:50
5.	"Tornado"	Lee Jae-Jin, tomomi	Lee Jae-Jin	3:39
6.	"CRYING IN THE RAIN"	Kenn Kato	corin.	5:08
7.	"Moonlight"	H.U.B	Hiroyuki Fujino	4:41
8.	"DAYDREAMER"	Lee Hong-Ki, Kenn Kato	Choi Jong-Hoon, Park Woo	4:07
9.	"Hourglass"	MOTHBALL	MOTHBALL	4:02
10.	"My Birthday"	Lee Hong-Ki	Lee Hong-Ki, Taka	4:48
11.	"FISH (Acoustic Version)"	Choi Jong-Hoon, Lee Jae-Jin	Choi Jong-Hoon, Heaven Light	4:22
Total length:				46:17
