= Ji (Korean name) =

Ji (Korean: 지), also spelled Jee, Chi, or Chee, is a Korean surname, as well as a Korean given name.

== Family name ==
As a family name, Ji may be written with either of two hanja, one meaning "wisdom" (智), and the other meaning "pond" (池). Each has one clan: for the family name meaning "wisdom", Pongju Village, Pongsan County, North Hwanghae in what is today North Korea, and for the family name meaning "pond", Chungju, Chungcheongbuk-do in what is today South Korea. The 2000 South Korean census found 147,572 people with this family name.

In a study by the National Institute of the Korean Language based on 2007 application data for South Korean passports, it was found that 79.5% of people with this surname spelled it in Latin letters as Ji in their passports. Another 9.0% spelled it as Jee, and 8.5% as Chi. Rarer alternative spellings (the remaining 3.0%) included Gi, Chee, Je, and Jy. For the Koryo-saram from the former Soviet Union, it was spelled as Ti (Russian: Ти).

Notable people with this family name include:

=== Ji ===
- Ji Chang-wook (born 1987), South Korean actor and singer
- Ji Cheong-cheon (1888–1959), Korean independence activist
- Ji Da-bin (born 2006), Indonesian footballer
- Ji Dong-won (born 1991), South Korean professional footballer
- Ji Eun-hee (born 1986), South Korean professional golfer
- Ji Eun-sung (born 1991), South Korean actor
- Ji Ha-yoon (born 1995), South Korean actress and model
- Ji Han-jae (born 1936), South Korean hapkido grandmaster
- Ji Hye-won (born 1998), South Korean actress
- Ji Hyun-woo (born 1984), South Korean actor and musician
- Ji Jin-hee (born 1971), South Korean actor
- Ji Kyeong-deuk (born 1990), South Korean footballer
- Ji Kyong-sun (born 1975), North Korean former judoka
- Ji Sang-jun (born 1973), South Korean retired swimmer
- Ji Sang-ryeol (born 1970), South Korean actor
- Ji Seo-yeon (born 2005), South Korean figure skater
- Ji Seong-ho (born 1982), South Korean politician
- Ji Seong-hwan (born 1974), South Korean field hockey player
- Ji Seung-hyun (born 1979), South Korean handball player
- Ji Seung-hyun (born 1981), South Korean actor
- Ji So-yun (born 1991), South Korean professional footballer
- Ji Yoon-ho (born Yoon Byung-ho, 1991), South Korean actor
- Ji Young-jun (born 1981), South Korean long distance runner
- Ji Yun-nam (born 1976), North Korean former professional footballer

=== Others ===
- Alexander Chee (fl. 2000s), American writer
- Ien Chi (born 1991), Korean American filmmaker
- Chi In-jin (born 1973), South Korean former professional boxer
- Jee Man-won (born 1942), South Korean political scientist and journalist
- Jee Seok-jin (born 1966), South Korean entertainer
- Jee Yong-ju (1948–1985), South Korean amateur boxer
- Jhi Yeon-woo (born 1984), South Korean retired bodybuilder
- Daniel Tji Hak-soun (1921–1993), South Korean Roman Catholic bishop

== Given name ==
People with the given name Ji include:

- Yi Ji (1598–1623), Joseon dynasty crown prince, deposed in 1622
- Shin Ji (born 1981 as Lee Jee-seon), South Korean singer and lyricist

== See also ==
- List of Korean family names
- List of Korean given names
