= Rated-FT =

Studio album by F.T. Island
- Released: June 12, 2013
- Genre: Rock
- Language: Japanese
- Label: Warner Music Japan

F.T. Island chronology
| Five Treasure Box (2012) | Rated-FT (2013) | The Singles Collection (2013) |

Singles from Rated-FT
- 1. "Top Secret" Released: August 8, 2012; 2. "Polar Star" Released: November 28, 2012; 3. "You Are My Life" Released: March 27, 2010

Rated-FT is a Japanese-language studio album by South Korean rock band F.T. Island, released on 12 June 2013 by Warner Music Japan. The album features songs composed and written by members of the band, namely Time To, Hold My Hand, Black Chocolate and Orange Sky. The album opened at 3rd place on the Oricon daily chart and lead the Yamamoto Music Korea-Asia weekly chart.

== Track listing ==
| No. | Title | Lyrics | Music | Length |
|---|---|---|---|---|
| 1. | "Beat It" | H.U.B. | corin. | 03:18 |
| 2. | "Freedom" | Tarantula | corin. | 03:32 |
| 3. | "Top Secret" | Kenichi Maeyamada (前山田健一) | corin. | 03:50 |
| 4. | "You Are My Life" | Gary Baker, Anthony Little, Frank Myers, Kenn Kato | Andrew Lane, Anthony Little | 03:47 |
| 5. | "Beloved" | Gorō Matsui (松井五郎) | Lee Jae-jin, Daichi | 04:28 |
| 6. | "Beautiful World" | Kenn Kato | Choi Jong-hoon | 04:28 |
| 7. | "Time to" | Lee Jae-jin | Lee Jae-jin, VINYL HOUSE | 03:18 |
| 8. | "Hold My Hand" | Choi Jong-hoon | Choi Jong-hoon, Han Seong-ho, Shin Min-gyu | 03:35 |
| 9. | "Black Chocolate" | Lee Hong-gi, Kenn Kato | I Honggi, R307 | 03:25 |
| 10. | "Polar Star" | Hiroki Horiko (堀向彦輝) | Hiroki Horiko | 04:05 |
| 11. | "オレンジ色の空 Orenji iro no sora" (Orange Sky) | Lee Hong-gi, Kenn Kato | Lee Hong-gi, Han Seong-ho, Jang Young-su | 04:49 |
