= Memory in FTIsland =

EP by F.T. Island
- Released: October 10, 2011
- Recorded: 2011
- Genre: pop-rock
- Label: FNC Entertainment, CJ E&M

F.T. Island chronology
Return (2011)	Memory in FTIsland (2011)	Grown-Up (2012)

Singles from Memory in FTIsland
- 1. "새들처럼 Saedeulcheoreom (Like Birds)" Released: 10 October 2011

Memory in FTIsland is a Korean language EP by South Korean band F.T. Island, released on October 10, 2011. The album contains 5 remake songs, the style of which was arranged in a way to suit the band.

== Track list ==
No.	Title	Lyrics	Music	Length
1.	"새들처럼 Saedeulcheoreom" (Like Birds)	Ji Geun-sik	Ji Geun-sik	03:29
2.	"상심 Sangsim" (Heartache)	Hong Jae-seon	Hong Jae-seon	04:05
3.	"그대 눈물까지도 Geudae nunmulkkajido" (Even If It’s Your Tears)	Oh Ji-hun	Oh Ji-hun	04:22
4.	"이별 아닌 이별 Ibyeol anin ibyeol" (Not a True Goodbye)	Oh Tae-ho	Oh Tae-ho	03:21
5.	"신사동 그 사람 Sinsa-dong geu saram" (That Person in Shinsadong)	Jeong Eun-yi	Nam Geug-in	04:30
