= So Long, Au Revoir =

Studio album by F.T. Island
- Released: December 16, 2009
- Genre: Rock
- Language: Japanese
- Label: AI Entertainment

F.T. Island chronology
Cross & Change (2009)	So Long, Au Revoir (2009)	Japan Special Album Vol. 1 (2010)

Singles from So Long, Au Revoir
- 1. "The One" Released: December 17, 2008; 2. "I Believe Myself" Released: April 22, 2009; 3. "Raining" Released: October 21, 2009

So Long, au Revoir is the first Japanese language studio album by South Korean rock band F.T. Island, released on 16 December 2009 by indie label AI Entertainment. The first single, The One, released much earlier, debuted at 9th place on the Oricon daily chart. This was the last album recorded with Oh Won-bin, who shortly thereafter left the band.

== Track list ==
No.	Title	Length
1.	"Ready Go!!"
2.	"Live Like a Musical"
3.	"TV Radio"
4.	"Everything is Possible"
5.	"I Believe Myself"
6.	"Raining"
7.	"Moonlight Angel"
8.	"You'll Be in My Heart"
9.	"It's U"
10.	"The One"
11.	"Winter's Night"
