= Cross & Change =

Studio album by F.T. Island
- Released: July 16, 2009
- Recorded: 2009
- Genre: Pop rock
- Labels: FNC Entertainment, CJ E&M

F.T. Island chronology
Jump Up (2009)	Cross & Change (2009)	So Long, Au Revoir (2009)

Singles from Cross & Change
- 1. "바래 (I Hope)" Released: 16 July 2009

Cross & Change is the third Korean language studio album by South Korean band F.T. Island, released on July 16, 2009. The album contains 12 songs and the band's image is formulated around "bokgo", a retro style popular in Korea in the 1970s and 1980s.

== Track listing ==
No.	Title	Lyrics	Music	Length
1.	"빙빙빙; Bingbingbing"	Lee Hui-seung	Han Seung-hun	3:30
2.	"바래; Barae" (I Hope)	Kim Do-hun, Kim Se-jin	Kim Do-hun, Han Seong-ho	3:50
3.	"미우나 고우나; Miuna gouna" (Love It, Hate It)	Choi Hye-jeong	Choi Hye-jeong	4:21
4.	"천사와 나무꾼; Cheonsawa namukkun" (Angel and the Woodsman)	Han Seong-ho	Kim Jae-yang	3:33
5.	"소녀를 만나다 (소나기); Sonyeoreul mannada (sonagi)" (Boy Meets Girl (Rainfall))	Han Seong-ho	Kim Jae-yang	4:13
6.	"결혼해줘; Gyeolhonhaejwo" (Let's Get Married)	Choi Hye-jeong	Choi Hye-jeong	3:34
7.	"꼭은 아니더라도; Kkogeun anideorado" (Even If It's Not Necessary)	Han Seong-ho	Han Seong-ho, Han Seung-hun	4:25
8.	"첫눈에 알아; Cheonnune ara" (I Knew from First Sight)	Han Seong-ho	Han Seong-ho, Han Seung-hun	3:41
9.	"보내주기; Bonaejugi" (Send Away)	Myeong In-hui	Kim Bo-min	3:55
10.	"못난이; Monnani" (Ugly)	Han Seong-ho	Han Seong-ho	3:14
11.	"남의 속도 모르고; Namui sokdo moreugo" (Make Little of Others)	Han Seong-ho	Han Seong-ho, Choi Hye-jeong	3:56
12.	"바래 (Ver.2)" (I Hope)	Kim Do-hun, Han Seong-ho	Kim Do-hun, Kim Se-jin	3:49

== Bibliography ==
- "Cross & Change" (in Korean). FNC Entertainment.
