= Five Treasure Box =

Studio album by F.T. Island
- Released: September 10, 2012
- Recorded: 2012
- Genre: Alternative rock, acoustic rock, punk rock
- Length: 36:50
- Label: FNC Entertainment, Mnet Media

F.T. Island chronology
20 [Twenty] (2012)	Five Treasure Box (2012)	Rated-FT (2013)

Singles from Five Treasure Box
- 1. "I Wish" Released: September 10, 2012

Five Treasure Box is the fourth studio album by South Korean rock band F.T. Island. It was released in South Korea on September 10, 2012, under FNC Entertainment and distributed by Mnet Media. Being the band's first studio album in three years, the title of the album reflects the "treasure" of the songs on the album, where they contributed to seven of the ten tracks on the album by songwriting or composition. The album sold over 30,000 copies in its first week and debuted at number one on the weekly Gaon albums chart. The single "I Wish" has peaked at number eight on the weekly Gaon singles chart and earned F.T. Island one K-Chart win on Mnet's music television program M! Countdown.

== Background ==
The album is titled Five Treasure Box due to the members contributing to the lyrics and composition of seven of the ten tracks on the album. Guitarist Choi Jong-hoon stated that the band "worked on everything from guitar rift, sound and song genre". The album includes five Korean-language tracks previously recorded in Japanese. Speaking of these tracks, bassist Lee Jae-jin explained that "it was too much of a waste to lock up our songs [in Japan]". The band rewrote the lyrics in Korean and suggested to FNC Entertainment to include them on the album. Drummer Choi Min-hwan explained that the band chose "the best" songs to rewrite, while taking the "album’s mood" into consideration.

On the album jacket photos, each member was pictured with their most "treasured" possessions. Guitarist Choi Jong-hoon was pictured with exercise equipment, lead vocalist Lee Hongki was pictured with his three dogs, bassist Lee Jae-jin was pictured with magazines, comic books, and potato chips, drummer Choi Min-hwan was pictured with a television and a teddy bear, and guitarist Song Seung-hyun was pictured with sheet music and a headset.

== Composition ==
Five Treasure Box contains elements of modern, acoustic, and punk rock music. The promotional track "I Wish" was written by Han Seong-ho and composed by Kim Do-hun and Han. Classified as a pop rock song, "I Wish" begins with an acoustic guitar, and the song gradually builds up into the chorus. The band members spoke of disappointment that the song was being used as the promotional single. They expressed understanding in the choice of FNC Entertainment wanting to promote a song with wider appeal, but the band showed preference over the tracks they composed.

== Release and promotion ==
F.T. Island first performed a snippet of "I Wish" on September 1, 2012, at their Take Island concert. A music video teaser was revealed on September 6, which featured label mate Hye-jeong from AOA. That same day, a promotional truck playing the music video teaser drove throughout Seoul in order to promote the album. The full music video and the album was released on September 10.

On September 13, F.T. Island began promoting "I Wish" by performing the song, as well as "Let It Go!", on Mnet's M! Countdown. The band also made their comeback performances in the following days with "I Wish" and "Paper Plane" on Korean Broadcasting System's (KBS) Music Bank, performing "I Wish" and "Compass (The Way)" on Munhwa Broadcasting Corporation's (MBC) Show! Music Core, and on Seoul Broadcasting System's (SBS) The Music Trend with "I Wish" and "Life". On September 20, "I Wish" earned its first and only K-Chart win on M! Countdown.

On September 25, F.T. Island performed "Compass", "I Wish", and "Life" on Choi Hwa-jeong's SBS radio show Power Time.

== Chart performance ==
Within the first week of its release, Five Treasure Box sold over 30,000 copies in South Korea. It went on to debut at number one on the Gaon albums chart. The album charted at number three on the Gaon monthly albums chart for September, selling 46,982 copies that month. On the issue dated September 13, 2012, "I Wish" debuted at number 23 on the Billboard Korea K-Pop Hot 100. The following week, it rose to number 13 on said chart, and it peaked at number 12 the week after. On the Gaon singles chart, the song debuted at number eight.

== Track listing ==
No.	Title	Lyrics	Music	Length
1.	"I Wish" (좋겠어; Jotgesseo)	Han Seong-ho	Kim Do-hun	3:41
2.	"Your Words" (너의 말; Neoeui Mal)	Kim Jae-yang	Jeon Geun-hwa, Han Seung-hun	4:44
3.	"Stay with Me"	Lee Hongki, Han Seung-hun	Han Seung-hun	3:04
4.	"U (All I Want Is You)"	Kim Jae-yang	Choi Jong-hoon, Han Seung-hun	3:15
5.	"Let Her Go..." (보내주자...; Bonaejuja...)	Han Seong-ho	Han Seung-hun	3:44
6.	"Paper Plane"	Kim Jae-yang, Lee Jae-jin	Lee Jae-jin, Corin	4:01
7.	"Wanna Go (World Does Not End Song)" (세상 끝나지 않는 노래; Sesang Kkeutnaji Anneun Norae)	Lee Jae-jin	Song Seung-hyun, Choi Min-hwan, Corin	3:26
8.	"Life"	Lee Hongki	Choi Jong-hoon	3:38
9.	"Compass (The Way)" (그 길; Geu Gil)	Lee Hongki	Song Seung-hyun, Choi Min-hwan	3:45
10.	"Let It Go!"	Kim Jae-yang, Choi Jong-hoon	Choi Jong-hoon, Corin	3:38
Total length:				36:50

== Chart history ==
Chart (2011)	Peak position
South Korean Gaon album chart	1
South Korean Gaon domestic album chart	1
