= Return (EP) =

EP by F.T. Island
- Released: May 24, 2011
- Recorded: 2011
- Genre: Pop rock
- Length: 17:38
- Label: FNC Entertainment; KT Music

F.T. Island chronology
Five Treasure Island (2011)	Return (2011)	Memory in FTISLAND (2011)

Singles from Return
- 1. "Hello Hello" Released: May 23, 2011

Return is a Korean-language EP by South Korean band F.T. Island, released on May 24, 2011. The album contains five songs, including the lead single "Hello Hello", which a music video was shot for.

== Track listing ==
Return track listing
No.	Title	Lyrics	Music	Length
1.	"Hello Hello"	Kim Do-hun, Lee Sang-ho, Han Seong-ho	Kim Do-hun, Lee Sang-ho	3:15
2.	"Oh"	Lee Hui-seung	Kim Jae-yang	3:16
3.	"I'm Going to Have You" (널 갖겠다; Neol gatgettda)	Lee Seung-ho	Han Seung-hun	3:09
4.	"I Confess" (고백합니다; Gobaekhamnida)	Lee Hui-seung	Choi Jong-hoon, Han Seung-hun	3:49
5.	"Sunshine Girl"	Han Seong-ho	Han Seung-hun	4:09
Total length:				17:38

== Charts ==
Chart performance for Return
Chart (2011)	Peak position
South Korean Albums (Gaon)	1
