= Over 10 Years =

Studio album by FT Island
- Released: June 7, 2017
- Recorded: 2017
- Genre: Pop rock
- Length: 47:45
- Language: Korean
- Label: FNC Entertainment

FT Island chronology
United Shadows (2017)	Over 10 Years (2017)	Planet Bonds (2018)

Singles from Over 10 Years
- 1. "Love Sick" Released: May 28, 2017; 2. "Wind" Released: June 7, 2017

Over 10 Years is a special album (unofficially the seventh Korean album) by South Korean rock band, FT Island, released on June 7, 2017, by FNC Entertainment. The album was preceded by a remake of the band's debut song, "Love Sick", while the lead single, "Wind", released alongside the album.

== Background ==
FT Island debuted on June 7, 2007, with the album, Cheerful Sensibility, and its lead title, "Love Sick". Since then the band has grown in fame, being referred to as "Korea's first ever K-pop idol band."

On May 21, 2017, FNC Entertainment announced that FT Island would be releasing an album to commemorate their tenth anniversary on June 7, coinciding with their original debut date. On May 23, the band opened up a website to share their tenth anniversary promotions, as well as the news of a remake of "Love Sick", scheduled for release on May 28. On the day "Love Sick" released, FT Island revealed the album and its title, showing a comeback schedule on Twitter.

== Reception ==
Over 10 Years received positive reception, with a peak of number 2 on the Gaon chart, number 34 on Oricon, and a total of over 30,000 copies of the album sold between Japan and Korea. In a review by Billboard, they stated "The tracks on the anniversary album flit through the group's sonic history, featuring everything from rock ballads like "Imagine You" and "The Wood" to the more upbeat pop rock vibe of the likes of "No Better Days" and “What U Want," each of which would likely be single-material on a less sentimental album." Billboard praised such as "Parade" and "Voice" for keeping in tune with their modern style while tracks like "Wind" were made in the style of songs around the time of their debut.

== Track listing ==
Over 10 Years track listing
No.	Title	Lyrics	Music	Length
1.	"원해 (What U Want)"	이재진	이재진 / Chris Wahle	3:16
2.	"Wind"	이홍기	이홍기 / IL	4:23
3.	"Travel"	이홍기 / 이재진	이홍기 / IL	3:35
4.	"Champagne"	BIG BROTHER	이홍기 / BIG BROTHER / IL	3:05
5.	"The Night"	이재진	이재진 / Andy Platts / 이상호	3:23
6.	"너를 그린다 (Imagine You)"	최종훈	최종훈 / 김창락 / Magnus Funemyr	3:57
7.	"Save Me"	김동원 / BIG BROTHER	이홍기 / 김동원 / BIG BROTHER / Stainboys	3:36
8.	"Still With You"	최민환 / 이상윤	미나리꽁 / Yusuke Watada	3:58
9.	"Voice"	이홍기 / BIG BROTHER	BIG BROTHER / 이홍기 / 이재진 / Stainboys	3:21
10.	"Parade"	이홍기 / BIG BROTHER	이홍기 / BIG BROTHER / Stainboys	3:40
11.	"No Better Days"	최종훈 / 이상윤	최종훈 / 김창락 / Erik Lidbom	4:19
12.	"나무 (The Wood)"	이재진 / 김동원	이재진 / 김동원	2:51
13.	"사랑앓이 (With 김나영) (Love Sick (With Kim Na Young))"	YOSHIMATA RYO / 류재현	YOSHIMATA RYO / 류재현	4:26
Total length:				47:45
