= Where's the Truth? =

Studio album by F.T. Island
- Released: July 18, 2016
- Recorded: 2016
- Genre: K-pop; pop rock
- Label: FNC Entertainment, LOEN Entertainment

F.T. Island chronology
N.W.U (2016)	Where's the Truth? (2016)	United Shadows (2017)

Singles from Where's the Truth?
- 1. ""Take Me Now"" Released: July 18, 2016

Where's the Truth? is the sixth Korean language studio album by South Korean rock band F.T. Island, released under FNC Entertainment on July 18, 2016. The album is entirely self-produced by the members. The album reached number 5 on the Billboard World Albums chart, making it F.T. Island's highest-charting album up to that point.

The music video for the title song "Take Me Now" was also released on the same day. The song "Take Me Now" is typically dynamic transition feature strong K-pop with the flourishing electronic rock.

== Track listing ==
No.	Title	Lyrics	Music	Length
1.	"Out of Love"	Lee Hong-gi, Jamil Kazmi	Hong's Tower	03:52
2.	"Take Me Now"	Lee Hong-gi, Jamil Kazmi	Hong's Tower	03:14
3.	"Lose"	Lee Jae-jin	Lee Jae-jin, Kim Dong-won	04:23
4.	"가면 (Mask)"	Choi Jong Hun	Choi Jong Hun, Han Seung-hun	04:01
5.	"너에게 물들어 (Becoming You)"	Choi Jong Hun, Lee Ji-ho	Choi Jong Hun, Go Jin-young	03:52
6.	"Stand By Me"	Lee Jae-jin	Lee Jae-jin, Kim Jae-yang, Park Hyun-woo	04:04
7.	"Paparazzi"	Choi Jong Hun, Song Seung-hyun, Lee Ji-ho	Choi Jong Hun	04:37
8.	"Wonderful Life"	Lee Hong-gi	Hong's Tower	04:31
9.	"We Are..."	Lee Hong-gi	Hong's Tower	03:30

== Charts ==
=== Weekly charts ===
Chart (2016)	Peak position
South Korean Albums (Gaon)	1
US World Albums (Billboard)	5
