= Colorful Sensibility =

Studio album by F.T. Island
- Released: August 25, 2008
- Recorded: 2008
- Genre: Pop rock
- Label: FNC Entertainment, CJ E&M

F.T. Island chronology
Prologue of F.T. Island: Soyogi (2018)	Colorful Sensibility (2008)	Colorful Sensibility Part 2 (2008)

Singles from Colorful Sensibility
- 1. "사랑후애 (Saranghue; After Love)" Released: 2008

Colorful Sensibility is the second studio album by South Korean band F.T. Island, released on 25 August 2008. The album sold 11,209 copies in one month.

== Track list ==
No.	Title	Lyrics	Music	Length
1.	"사랑후애 Saranghuae" (After Love)	Han Seong-ho (한성호)	Han Seong-ho	04:29
2.	"여자는 몰라 Yeojaneun mulla" (Girls Don' Know)	Han Seong-ho	Han Seung-hun	04:10
3.	"그대는 사랑입니다 Geudaeneun sarangimnida" (You Are Love)	Han Seong-ho	Han Seong-ho	04:34
4.	"Love Is"	Han Seong-ho	Han Seong-ho	03:53
5.	"멋쟁이 Vs 예쁜이 (FT Vs PRI) Meotjaengi vs Yebbeuni (FT Vs PRI)" (The Cool vs The Pretty (FT vs PRI))	Han Seong-ho	Han Seung-hun	04:11
6.	"외워두기 Wiwodugi" (Memorize)	Han Seong-ho	Han Seung-hun	04:02
7.	"미워하고 원망하고 Miwohago wonmanghago" (Hate And Resentment)	Han Seong-ho	Han Seong-ho	04:16
8.	"1분 1초도 1 bun 1 chodo" (One Minute And One Second)	Kang Eun-gyeong	Kim Jae-yang	03:56
9.	"사랑하지마요 Saranghajimayo" (Don’t Love Me)	Han Seong-ho	Kim Jae-yang	04:07
10.	"사랑이라 부르는 이름 Sarangira bureuneun ireum" (A Name Called Love)	Han Seong-ho	Han Seong-ho	04:23
11.	"Troublemaker"	Han Seong-ho	Mun Jeong-gyu	03:59
12.	"Train"	Lee Hui-seung	Han Seong-ho	03:54
