= N.W.U =

Studio album by F.T. Island
- Released: April 6, 2016
- Recorded: 2016
- Length: 42:25
- Label: Warner Music Japan

F.T. Island chronology
5.....Go (2015)	N.W.U (2016)	Where's the Truth? (2016)

Singles from N.W.U
- 1. "You Don't Know Who I Am" Released: March 18, 2016

N.W.U is a 2016 Japanese-language album by South Korean rock band F.T. Island and is the band's seventh Japanese studio album. N.W.U is an acronym of 'Naite' (泣いて, to cry), 'Waratte' (笑って, to laugh), 'Utatte' (歌って, to sing). The album was released on 6 April 2016 and became top selling album that week in Japan's Tower Records.

The title track is "You Don't Know Who I Am" which was released on YouTube on March 18. Just like the previous album, members took part in writing the lyrics or composing music.

== Track listing ==
No.	Title	Lyrics	Music	Length
1.	"YOU DON'T KNOW WHO I AM"	Lee Hong-Ki, Tarantula	Erik Lidbom, Ryohei Yamamoto	03:24
2.	"PUPPY"	Lee Hongki, Kenn Kato, Wise	Lee Hongki, Corin	03:40
3.	"COME ON GIRL"	Lee Hongki, Hajime Watanabe	Lee Hongki, Lee Wonil	03:26
4.	"素晴らしい人生を" (A Wonderful Life)	Choi Jonghoon, Miwa	Choi Jong-Hoon	03:51
5.	"AQUA"	Lee Jae-Jin, Kosuke	Lee Jaejin, Kim Hyunil, Kim Dongwon	4:15
6.	"アイデンティティ" (Identity)	Choi Jonghoon, Miwa	Choi Jonghoon, Han Seunghoon	04:28
7.	"imagine"	Lee Jaejin, H.U.B.	Lee Jaejin, Ko Jinyeong	03:50
8.	"Walking Dead"	Lee Hong-Ki, Tarantula	Lee Hongki, Kim Dongwon, Lee Sumin	03:51
9.	"Time"	Lee Jaejin, H.U.B.	Lee Jaejin, Kim Dongwon	03:26
10.	"Cycle"	Lee Hongki, Kenn Kato	Erik Lidbom, Hong's Tower	03:54
11.	"We are..."	Lee Hongki, Kenn Kato	Hong's Tower	4:20
Total length:				42:25
