= New Page (album) =

Studio album by F.T. Island
- Released: May 28, 2014
- Genre: Rock
- Language: Japanese
- Label: Warner Music Japan

F.T. Island chronology
Rated-FT (2012)	New Page (2014)	Japan Best - All About (2014)

Singles from New Page
- 1. "Be Free" Released: May 8, 2014; 2. "Mitaiken Future" Released: March 16, 2014; 3. "Beautiful" Released: Jan 15, 2014; 4. "Shiawa Theory" Released: July 3, 2013

New Page is a Japanese-language studio album by South Korean rock band F.T. Island, released on 8 May 2014 by Warner Music Japan. The band previously released three singles that were later included in the album, amongst them Mitaiken Future.

== Track listing ==
No.	Title	Lyrics	Music	Length
1.	"BE FREE"	加藤 健	Kouta Okochi / corin.	03:32
2.	"アリガト" (Thank You)	Yasuaki Moriya	Yasuaki Moriya	05:04
3.	"未体験Future" (Mitaiken Future)	GAKU	GAKU	03:36
4.	"DESTINY"	Hiroshi Okazaki / Takashi Ogawa / Gyo Kitagawa / GK	Hiroshi Okazaki / Takashi Ogawa / Gyo Kitagawa / GK	03:19
5.	"Find the way"	최종훈 / H.U.B.	최종훈 / 장영수	03:54
6.	"EYES ON ME"	송승현 / 加藤 健	최민환 / 송승현 / 신민규	03:42
7.	"beautiful"	Kunio Tago	Kunio Tago	04:50
8.	"Shinin' On"	Tarantula	Minoru Komorita	04:08
9.	"BORN TO BE A ROCK N ROLLER"	加藤 健	이홍기	03:15
10.	"Morning Coffee"	Lee Jae Jin, H.U.B	Lee Jae Jin, Jang Young Soo	05:02
11.	"Last Love Song"	최종훈	최종훈 / 장영수	04:07
12.	"On My Way"	이홍기 / 加藤 健	이홍기 / 장영수 / 신민규	4:07
13.	"シアワセオリー" (Theory of Happiness)	いしわたり 淳治	宅見将典	04:06
14.	"Precious one" (bonus track)	Kouta Okochi	Kouta Okochi	3:17
Total length:				56:44
