= Lee Jae-jin (musician, born 1991) =

South Korean musician and actor

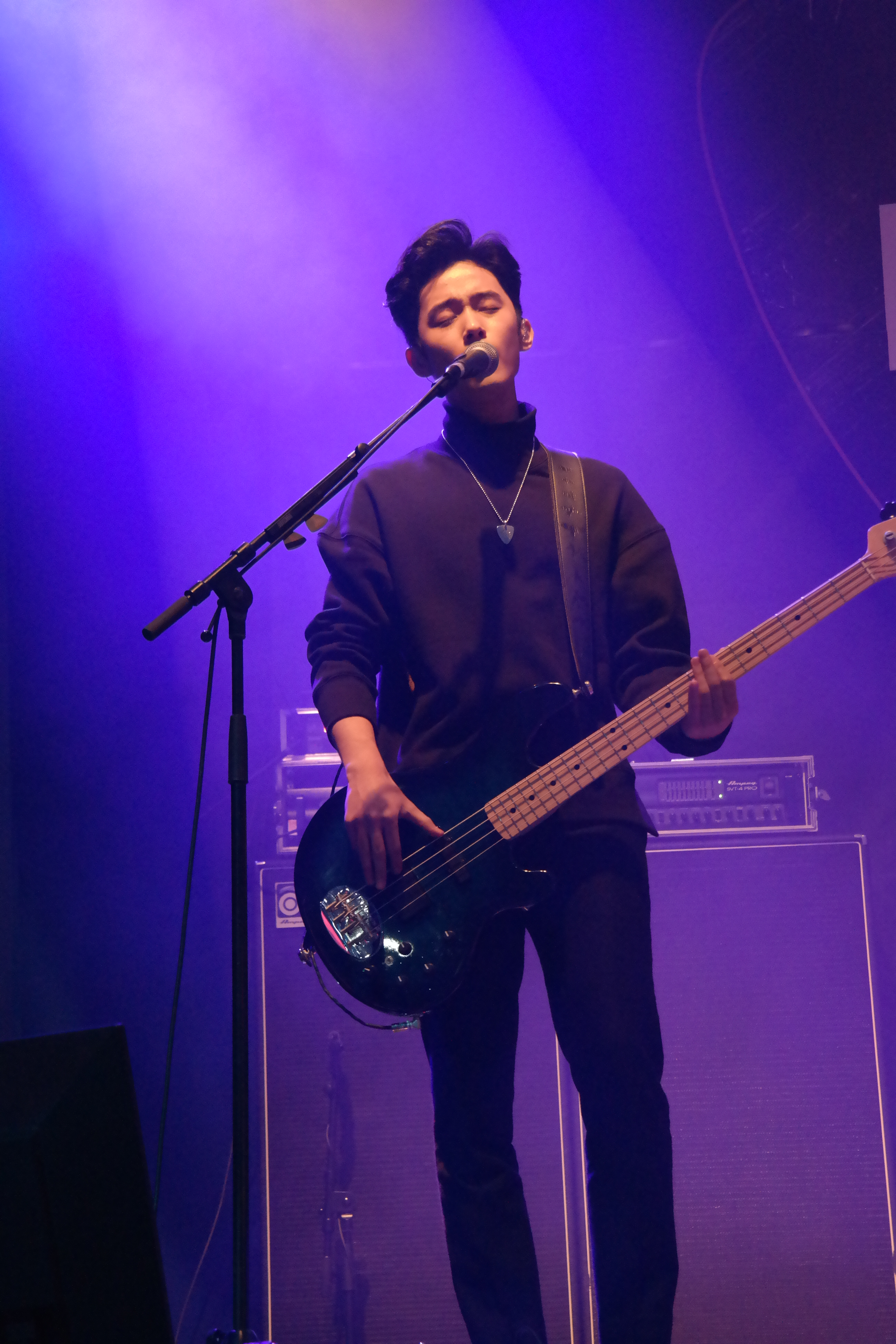
- Lee in Paris, 2015

Background information
- Born: Lee Jae-jin (이재진); December 17, 1991 (age 34); Cheongju, South Korea
- Origin: Cheongju, South Korea
- Genres: Rock; pop
- Occupations: Musician; bassist; songwriter; composer; actor
- Instruments: Bass guitar; guitar; vocals
- Years active: 2007–present
- Labels: FNC; AI; Warner Japan
- Member of: F.T. Island; F.T. Triple
- Website: fncent.com/ftisland/

Korean name
- Hangul: 이재진
- Hanja: 李在真
- RR: I Jaejin
- MR: I Chaejin

Lee Jae-jin (Korean: 이재진; Japanese: イ・ジェジン; born December 17, 1991) is a South Korean musician and actor. He is a member of rock band F.T. Island, where he serves as the bassist and 2nd vocalist. He has also contributed to F.T. Island's body of work with several compositions of his own.

== Music career ==
=== F.T. Triple ===
In January 2009, members Choi Jong-hoon, Choi Min-hwan, and Lee Jae-jin were put into the sub group "A3". This group debuted at the 2009 New Year concert "My First Dream" held at the JCB Hall in Tokyo, Japan on January 2, 2009. Jae-jin performed as the vocalist and bassist. The group's name was "A3" due to each of the three members having type A blood. This group was formed to help take up some singing time during their concerts, so that main vocalist, Lee Hongki, would not overstrain his voice.

In late 2009, A3 was renamed F.T. Triple and began working with Lee Jae-jin on guitar instead of bass. They released the single "Love Letter" and began performing on music shows. During this time, F.T. Island's main vocalist Lee Hongki was busy filming a drama and guitarist Song Seung-hyun was involved in several variety shows.

== Acting career ==
He made his acting debut in the 2007 KBS2 sitcom Unstoppable Marriage. Lee Jae-jin was a main cast member while the other members made a cameo appearance. In the sitcom, he played the role of Wang Sa-baek (Sim Mal-yeon's fourth son), and appeared regularly on the show.

He also did a cameo in Style [Ep6] (SBS, 2009) and On Air (SBS, 2008).

In 2009, he was cast for the main role in the musical Sonagi, which is based on the classic Korean short story "Sonagi" written by Hwang Sun-won. He got the role as a young boy.

In 2013, he was cast in a Korean production of High School Musical along with AOA member Choa.

In 2021, Lee starred in the stage play Vampire Arthur, a stage play following his discharge from military service.

== Personal life ==
Lee's older sister, Lee Chae-Won was cast in the SBS drama On Air, where she played the make-up artist for Oh Seung-ah (Kim Ha-neul).

On January 21, 2020, Lee began his mandatory military service. He is the second FT Island member to enlist, after FT Island member Lee Hong-gi enlisted on September 30, 2019. On August 1, 2021, Lee was discharged from military service.

== Discography ==
=== Albums ===
- 2019: Scene. 27 (Japanese)

=== Soundtrack appearances ===
Year	Title	Album
2014	Come Inside	Bride of the Century OST

== Filmography ==
=== Films ===
Year	Title	Role	Notes
2016	Queen of Walking	Hyo Gil	Supporting role

=== Television series ===
Year	Title	Role	Notes
2007	Unstoppable Marriage	4th Son Wang Sa-baek	Main role
2008	On Air		Cameo, Ep. 1
2009	Style	Himself	Cameo, Ep. 6
2015	The Flatterer	Yoo Dae-chi	Main role, web drama
2017	My Only Love Song	Byun Sam-yong	Main role
2017	Band of Sisters	Na Jae-dong	Supporting role
2018	Rich Man	Kang Chan-soo	Supporting role

=== Variety/Reality shows ===
Year	Title	Role	Notes
2013–2014	Cheongdam-dong 111	Main cast	Reality show
2015	Coming Out FTISLAND	Main cast	Reality show (with F.T. Island members)
2018	King of Mask Singer	Contestant (Phoenix)	Variety show
2019	Let’s Go! Real Trip: Three Delicious Man	Main cast	Food and travel show (with Kwak Dong-yeon and Chef Chae Nak Young)

== Theater ==
Year	Title	Role	Ref.
2009	Sonagi	Han Dong Seok	
2013	High School Musical	Troy Bolton	
2020	Return: The Promise of the Day	Oh Jin Gu	
2021–2022	Vampire Arthur	Arthur	
