= Cheerful Sensibility =

Studio album by F.T. Island
- Released: June 5, 2007
- Recorded: 2007
- Genre: Pop rock
- Label: FNC Entertainment, CJ Medialine

F.T. Island chronology
Cheerful Sensibility (2007)	Prologue of F.T. Island: Soyogi (2008)

Singles from Cheerful Sensibility
- 1. "사랑앓이 (Lovesick)" Released: 2007

Cheerful Sensibility is the first studio album by South Korean band F.T. Island, released on 5 June 2007. The album contains 13 songs divided into two sections: "Emotional Chapter" consists of rock ballads, while "F.T. Island Chapter" is made up of pop-rock songs written by Japanese composers. The album sold 79,000 copies and became the sixth most sold album of the year in South Korea. It was re-released on 3 December by the title The Refreshment, with three new songs. The package included a Music 2.0 program, which enabled changes to the levels of vocals and instruments. It sold 25,724 copies.

== Track list ==
No.	Title	Lyrics	Music	Length
1.	"사랑앓이 Sarangalhi" (Lovesick)	Ryu Jae-hyeon (류재현) (Note: Love sick had a controversy of plagiarising the song "resolver" by Ryo Yoshimata(吉俣良) which is an original soundtrack for the Sora Kara Furu Ichioku no Hoshi, and it was ruled as plagiarism. Thus the copyright now is owned by Ryo.)	Ryu Jae-hyeon (류재현)	04:01
2.	"행복합니다 Haengbokhamnida" (I’m Happy)	Han Seong-ho (한성호)	Han Seong-ho	03:45
3.	"천둥 Cheondung" (Thunder)	Ahn Yeong-min (안영민)	Jo Yeong-su (조영수)	03:36
4.	"한사람만 Hansaramman" (Only One Person)	Lee Won-gi (이원기), Han Seong-ho	Han Seung-hun (한승훈)	04:16
5.	"집착 Jibchak" (Cling)	Han Seong-ho	Han Seong-ho	04:22
6.	"남자의 첫사랑은 무덤까지 간다 Namjaui cheotsarangeun mudeomkkaji kanda" (A Man’s First Love Follows Him To The Grave)	Han Gyeong-hye (한경혜)	Yoon Gun (윤건)	03:57
7.	"하지말래요 Hajimalleyo" (They Said To Stop)	Han Gyeong-hye	Yoon Gun	04:22
8.	"FT ISLAND"	Lee Hui-seung (이희승)	Yoshihiko Chino (知野 芳彦)	03:46
9.	"Reo Reo"	Han Seong-ho	Yoji Kubota (久保田洋司)	03:29
10.	"Primadonna"	Lee Hui-seung (이희승)	Daichi(大智)	04:39
11.	"마중 Majung" (Meeting)	Lee Hui-seung (이희승)	Ryosuke Nakanishi (中西亮輔)	04:40
12.	"사랑하는 법을 몰라서 Saranghaneun beobeul mullaseo" (Because I Didn’t Know How To Love)	Han Seong-ho	Hiroo Yamaguchi (山口寛雄)	05:38
13.	"첫키스 Cheotkiseu" (First Kiss)	Lee Seung-ho (이승호)	Shusui	05:33
