= Jhi Yeon-woo =

South Korean bodybuilder

- Professional bodybuilder

Personal info
- Born: April 26, 1984 (age 42); South Korea

Best statistics
- Height: 5 ft 7 in (1.70 m)
- Weight: In season: 175 lb (79 kg); Off-season: 205 lb (93 kg)

Professional (Pro) career
- Pro-debut: IFBB Vancouver Pro show Woman's Physique; 2015
- Best win: 2013 Arnold Classic Europe Physique Champion; 2013

- Jhi Yeon-woo
- Hangul: 지연우
- RR: Ji Yeonu
- MR: Chi Yŏnu

Jhi Yeon-woo (born April 26, 1984) is a retired South Korean bodybuilder.

== Contest history ==
- 2017 New York PRO Show 5th
- 2016 New York PRO Show 3rd
- 2016 WOMEN'S PHYSIQUE INTERNATIONAL COMPETITORS
- 2015 IFBB Vancouver Pro show Woman's Physique 4th
- 2013 Arnold Classic Europe Physique 1st (got the IFBB Pro card)
- 2012 MISS KOREA 3rd
- 2011 NPC Excalibur Woman bodybuilding 2nd
- 2011 Muscle Beach International figure Open Classic overall winner
- 2010 Korea YMCA over 52 kg 1st
