= Choi Min-hwan =

South Korean musician and actor

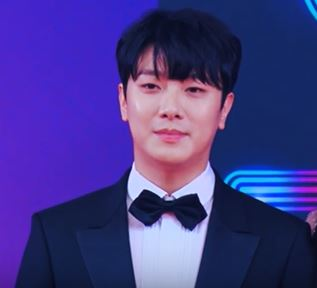
- Choi in 2018
- Born: 11 November 1992 (age 33); Seoul, South Korea
- Occupations: Singer; musician; drummer; actor
- Spouse: Kim Yul-hee (m. 2018; div. 2023)
- Children: 3
- Musical career
- Genres: Rock; pop
- Instruments: Drums; guitar; vocals
- Years active: 2007–present
- Labels: FNC; AI; Warner Japan
- Member of: F.T. Island; F.T. Triple
- Website: fncent.com/ftisland/

Korean name
- Hangul: 최민환
- Hanja: 崔敏煥
- RR: Choe Minhwan
- MR: Ch'oe Minhwan

Choi Min-hwan (Korean: 최민환; born 11 November 1992), also known by his mononym Minhwan, is a South Korean singer, musician, drummer and actor. He is a member of rock band F.T. Island, in which he serves as the drummer and backing vocalist. He is the youngest member of the group.

== Music career ==
=== F.T. Triple ===
In January 2009, members Choi Jong-hoon, Choi Min-hwan, and Lee Jae-jin were put into the sub group "A3". This group debuted at the 2009 New Year concert My First Dream held at the JCB Hall in Tokyo, Japan on 2 January 2009. Minhwan performed as the drummer and a sub-vocalist. The group's name was "A3" due to each of the three members having type A blood. This group was formed to help take up some singing time during their concerts, so that lead singer, Lee Hong-gi, would not over-strain his voice.

In late 2009, the triple-member group was renamed F.T. Triple, with Choi Min-hwan as drummer and sub vocalist. They released the single Love Letter and began performing on music shows. During this time, F.T. Island's main vocalist Lee Hongki was busy filming a TV series and guitarist Song Seung-hyun was involved in several variety shows.

=== Solo debut ===
On 29 April 2018, Choi released his first single titled "First Story" with 3 tracks.

== Acting career ==
Choi made his acting debut in 2009 in the TV drama The Road Home. On 23 March 2009, he collapsed while waiting to film. Choi was rushed to the hospital for treatment; he had been suffering from a cold and overwork, and was discharged the next day.

He also appeared in cameos in the film Unstoppable Marriage (2007), and the television series On Air (2008), and Style (2009).

Choi then starred in the musical Gwanghwamun Sonata. His character Ji-yong is a music director and singer with a bright personality. The musical ran from 10 November 2012 in Osaka, Japan, until January 2013 in Tokyo.

In June 2013, Choi joined the cast of Goong: Musical in Japan. He played the leading role of crown prince Lee Shin.

In January 2014, he played the main character in the musical Joseph Amazing.

== Personal life ==
In September 2017, Choi's agency confirmed that he was dating former Laboum member Kim Yul-hee. On 4 January 2018, Choi personally delivered the news of his engagement to Kim via his Instagram and revealed his plans to marry later that year. He subsequently announced on 9 May that Kim was pregnant and that they planned to marry on 19 October 2018. Their son, Jae-yul, was born on 18 May 2018. Choi, Kim, and Jae-yul joined the cast of the second season of Mr. House Husband in January 2019.

On 28 August 2019, Choi and Kim announced that they were expecting twins. On 11 February 2020, Choi announced on Instagram that Kim gave birth to twin girls. Following his daughters' births, Choi began his mandatory military service on 24 February as a reserve soldier, which enables him to commute from home during his service and care for his family. Choi was discharged from the military on 2 September 2021 and he rejoined as a cast member in the program Mr. House Husband.

On 4 December 2023, Choi and Kim announced through their respective social media accounts that they had decided to divorce.

== Filmography ==
=== TV series ===
Year	Title	Notes
2008	Unstoppable Marriage	Cameo, Ep. 62
2008	On Air	Cameo, Ep. 1
2009	Style	Cameo, Ep. 6
2009	The Road Home	Supporting role
2013–2014	Cheongdam-dong 111	Reality show
2015	Coming Out FTISLAND	Reality show (with F.T. Island members)
2016	Hot and Sweet	Web Drama, Main Role
2016	Mysterious Solver	Lead role, social film
2019–2020, 2021–present	Mr. House Husband	Reality show, Ep. 86-150

=== Musical ===
Year	Title	Role	Notes
2012–2013	Gwanghwamun Sonata	Jiyong	Main role
2013	Goong: Musical	Lee Shin	Main role
2014	Joseph and the Amazing Technicolor Dreamcoat	Joseph	Main role
