= Prologue of F.T. Island: Soyogi =

EP by F.T. Island
- Released: June 7, 2008
- Genre: Rock
- Language: Japanese
- Label: AI Entertainment

F.T. Island chronology
Cheerful Sensibility (2007)	Prologue of F.T. Island: Soyogi (2008)	Colorful Sensibility (2008)

Singles from Prologue of F.T. Island: Soyogi
- 1. "Soyogi" Released: 2008

Prologue of F.T. Island: Soyogi is the first Japanese EP released by South Korean rock band F.T. Island on 7 June 2008. Two of the songs, Primadonna and F.T. Island are Japanese-language versions of previously released Korean songs, while Always Be Mine is the English-language version of First Kiss. Music videos were released to Soyogi and Friendship. An extended version was later released as their first Japanese studio album, Japan Special Album Vol. 1.

== Track listing ==
Prologue of F.T. Island: Soyogi
No.	Title	Length
1.	"Friendship"
2.	"ミライジテンシャ Miraijitensa"
3.	"Soyogi"
4.	"Stars"
5.	"A Song for You"
6.	"FTIsland"
7.	"Primadonna"
8.	"Always Be Mine"

Japan Special Album Vol. 1
No.	Title	Length
1.	"Friendship"
2.	"ミライジテンシャ Miraijitensa"
3.	"Soyogi"
4.	"Stars"
5.	"A Song for You"
6.	"FTIsland" (Korean language)
7.	"Primadonna" (Korean language)
8.	"Always Be Mine"
9.	"The One"
10.	"Live Like A Musical" (Korean language)
11.	"You'll Be in My Heart"
12.	"The One" (instrumentális)
