= Ji Seung-hyun (handballer) =

South Korean handball player (born 1979)

Ji Seung-Hyun (born 7 January 1979) is a South Korean handball player who competed in the 2004 Summer Olympics.
