= Cheongdam-dong 111 =

South Korean television series

- Hangul: 청담동 111
- RR: Cheongdam-dong 111
- MR: Ch'ŏngdam-dong 111
- Genre: reality show
- Starring: FNC Entertainment artists and employees
- Country of origin: South Korea
- Original language: Korean
- No. of episodes: 8

Production
- Running time: 60 minutes per episode
- Production company: Unione Internet & Media

Original release
- Network: tvN
- Release: November 21, 2013 – January 9, 2014

Cheongdam-dong 111 (Korean: 청담동 111) is a reality show aired by South Korean television channel tvN between November 21, 2013 and January 9, 2014 about the daily life and inner workings of FNC Entertainment, a record label and talent agency. The title of the show reflects the agency's location in Cheongdam-dong, Gangnam District, Seoul.

== Story ==
The show is based on the format of reality shows, however it is not completely live. Real events that previously happened at the agency are dramatized. Dialogues and characters, however, are real.

== Cast ==
- Members of F.T. Island
- Members of CNBLUE
- Members of AOA
- Members of N.Flying
- Juniel
- Han Seung-ho, CEO
- Kim Yeong-seon, director responsible for artists
