= F.T. Island =

South Korean band

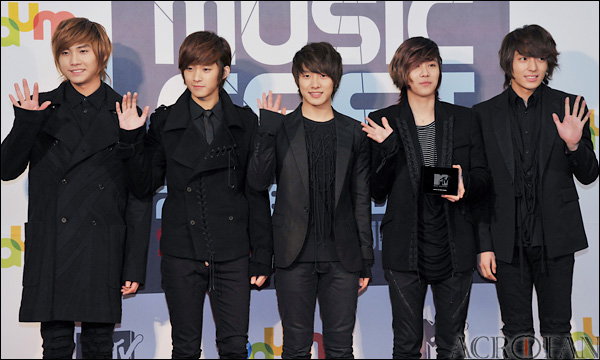
- F.T. Island in 2011; From left to right: Song Seung-hyun, Lee Jae-jin, Choi Min-hwan, Lee Hong-gi and Choi Jong-hoon

Background information
- Origin: Seoul, South Korea
- Genres: K-rock; pop rock
- Years active: 2007–present
- Labels: FNC; AI (Japan); Warner Japan
- Spinoffs: F.T. Triple
- Members: Lee Hong-gi; Lee Jae-jin; Choi Min-hwan
- Past members: Song Seung-hyun; Choi Jong-hoon; Oh Won-bin
- Website: fncent.com/ftisland/ ftisland-official.jp

F.T. Island (Korean: 에프티 아일랜드, or FT아일랜드, short for Five Treasure Island), is a South Korean rock band formed by FNC Entertainment in 2007. The band currently consists of main vocalist Lee Hong-gi, bassist Lee Jae-jin, and drummer Choi Min-hwan. Guitarist Oh Won-bin left the band in 2009 and was replaced by Song Seung-hyun. Former leader Choi Jong-hoon left the band and retired from the entertainment industry on March 14, 2019, while Seung-hyun left the group on December 31, 2019, to pursue his acting career.

F.T. Island debuted on the music television program M Countdown on June 7, 2007, with the single "Love Sick". Their debut studio album, Cheerful Sensibility, was the sixth best-selling of the year and "Love Sick" topped the K-pop charts for eight consecutive weeks. Later that year, the band won the Best New Male Group at the Mnet Asian Music Awards and the Popularity and Rookie of the Year awards at the Golden Disk Awards.

F.T. Island made their Japanese debut on June 8, 2008, with the extended play Prologue of F.T. Island: Soyogi. The band started getting recognition in the country following the release of their third Japanese studio album, Five Treasure Island, in 2011, which topped the Oricon Albums Chart and spawned the single "Flower Rock". Additionally, F.T. Island is the first foreign male band and the first band in 42 years to top the Oricon Daily Charts.

F.T. Island's most well-known songs include "After Love", "Bad Woman", "I Hope", "Hello Hello", "Severely", "I Wish", and the chart-toppers "Love Sick", "Thunder", "Until You Come Back", and "Love Love Love". Considered to be South Korea's first idol band, F.T. Island paved the way for such acts, including label mate N.Flying.

== History ==
=== 2007–2008: Debut with Cheerful Sensibility and Japanese debut with Prologue of F.T. Island: Soyogi ===
F.T. Island's first album, Cheerful Sensibility, was released on June 7, 2007. Prior to that, the members appeared on the South Korean television show "Wanna be my girlfriend?" (Korean: 두근두근 여친만들기) on Mnet. The band also performed live on stage at Rolling Hall and held their first official showcase at Live House Melon-AX, Gwangjang-dong in Seoul on May 27, 2007.

The album combined 13 songs that were loosely divided into two parts, "Emotional Chapter" and "F.T. Island Chapter", according to the genre of the songs. The "Emotional Chapter" consists of rock ballads, while the "F.T. Island Chapter" consists of a variety of pop rock sons produced by Japanese composers who worked with the Japanese band SMAP. Selling over 79,000 copies in 2007, it was the sixth best-selling album of the year. The album was later re-packaged on December 3, 2007, titled The Refreshment (Vol. 1.5) with three extra songs, a photo book, a stack of photo cards and a mixing program called Music 2.0, which allows one to adjust the levels of the instruments and vocals. The edition sold 25,724 copies in December 2007.

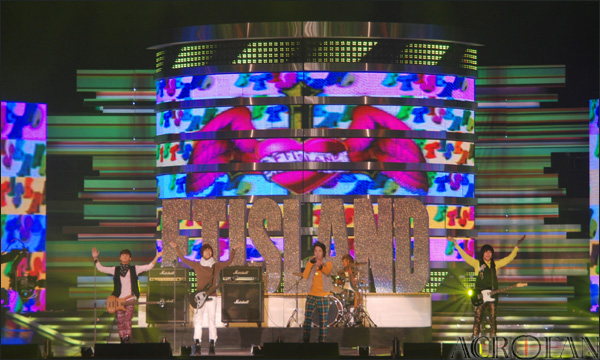
F.T. Island in 2008

After debuting in South Korea, FNC Entertainment (formerly FNC Music) moved F.T. Island's activities overseas. On March 31, 2008, an autograph session in Malaysia at the Damansara Cineleisure was held, which was to be followed by the group's first concert at the Sunway Lagoon Amphitheater the next day. However, the performance was canceled and subsequently held in Thailand instead, at the Royal Paragon Hall on April 14, 2008.

F.T. Island's first Japanese debut album, titled Prologue of F.T. Island: Soyogi, was then released on June 7, 2008. The album consists of eight songs, two of which were newer versions of the original songs "F.T. Island" and "Primadonna". The last track, "Always Be Mine", is an English version of "First Kiss" from their debut album (though the lyrics are original). Music videos were also released for "Soyogi" and "Friendship", displaying the band's professionalism and playful sides.

After their promotional activities in Japan, the band then returned to Korea, releasing their second Korean album Colorful Sensibility on August 27, 2008. A follow-up epilogue, Colorful Sensibility Part 2, was later released on October 17.

Later that year, F.T. Island also released "The One", their first Japanese commercial single under indie label AI Entertainment. The single charted at ninth on the Oricon daily charts. The single was also the last official release with member Oh Won Bin before his departure.

=== 2009–2010: Lineup changes, F.T. Triple and breakthrough in Japan ===
On January 28, 2009, it was announced that member Oh Won Bin would be leaving the group, with FNC trainee Song Seung-hyun replacing him as a guitarist and backup vocalist. With the new change in lineup, F.T. Island then released the music video for their mini-album with the title song "Bad Woman". They promoted it on SBS Inkigayo, and released their first South Korean mini-album Jump Up two days later.

On April 22, F.T. Island later released their second Japanese single, "I Believe Myself". For the first time, members participated in lyrics composition. For the song "Moonlight Angel", Jae-jin co-wrote the lyrics and Jong-hoon co-composed the song. "I Believe Myself" was the first Japanese single with member Seung-hyun. They held their 2009 F.T. Island Tour-I Believe Myself in Osaka, Nagoya and Tokyo during the summer of 2009. F.T. Island also toured parts of Asia which included Singapore, Japan, Thailand, Taiwan, and others to promote themselves in the summer of 2009. The showcase kicked off in Singapore during June 25 to 27.

While preparing for overseas promotions, the members were in the midst of recording their third album. On July 9, FNC Entertainment released jacket photos for the upcoming third album called Cross & Change. On the following day, a music video teaser for "I Hope" was released online, featuring kids watching their idols (played by the members themselves) on TV. The title song, called “I Hope/Barae”, was released on July 16. F.T. Island tried out a variety of music styles for Cross & Change; it included a total of 12 songs, ranging from moving ballads to addictive songs with a bright melody. F.T. Island adopted a new fashion style and concept for the album using a "retro" and the “Bokgo” approach, which was inspired during the “jeans jeans look” from the 80s in Korea.

F.T. Island released their 3rd Japanese single, "Raining", on October 21. A music video of the single was released. Jong-hoon played the piano for the single for the first time instead of the guitar.

After celebrating their 1000th day in the music industry, they travelled to Japan and they stayed until the end of August to prepare for their major debut under their new Japanese label, Warner Music Japan. They also began a new Japanese television show which aired on April 7, 2010. On May 19, F.T. Island released their new Japanese single "Flower Rock". It entered the oricon daily charts in third position on May 19, 2010, on the day of its release, and held the fourth position of that week. On July 14, F.T. Island released another single named "Brand-new days", which was written and composed by Seung-hyun and Jong-hoon. F.T. Island performed a five-city concert tour in Japan after releasing both singles. They also performed at the international rock festival Summer Sonic 2010 in Maishima Arena, Osaka, Japan.

After promotions in Japan, F.T. Island focused on their comeback in Korea in mid-August. Their new mini album Beautiful Journey and the music video for their main title song "Love Love Love" were released on August 25. They held their comeback performance in Korea on August 27. The title song topped many popular music charts in South Korea and also gained international notice, especially in Taiwan. Jong-hoon co-wrote and co-composed the song, "Don Quixote's Song", making it their first South Korean song that includes the composition of a member. In November and December, F.T. Island held performances such as the Beautiful Journey Concert and So Today... Concert tour, in both Korea and Japan.

While promoting their second South Korean mini-album, F.T. Island recorded another Japanese single titled "So Today..." that was released in November. The song, "Boom Boom Boom", was composed by Jong-hoon. The single ranked sixth on the Oricon Daily Charts. With F.T. Island's 3rd single taking the sixth position, they then had a record of all their singles ranking in the top ten of the Oricon charts. About 10,000 fans turned up at their promotional events in Osaka and Tokyo on 20 and 21 November.

The band then held a concert in Taiwan on December 25, celebrating Christmas together with 9000 fans. Former vocalist and guitarist Oh Wonbin, appeared as a special guest and performed his first single as a solo artist and a brand new song, which had not been released at the concert. F.T. Island performed songs in three languages, Korean, Japanese, and Chinese.

With an album sales record of over 100,000, F.T. Island won favorable comments in the Taiwanese media. The revenue for concert tickets and merchandises alone and F.T. Island's Beautiful Journey concert had exceeded a total of NT$20Million. They have been named the South Korean artists who earned the most money in the end of 2010. Four main news agencies namely, China Times, Yonhap News, Apple Daily and Liberty Times wrote news on the concerts, showing the band's high popularity. F.T. Island also broke several records in Taiwan with 500,000 hits on mobile downloads and 10,000,000 hits on music downloads.

=== 2011–2012: Continued Japanese popularity, Return to South Korea and rising popularity ===
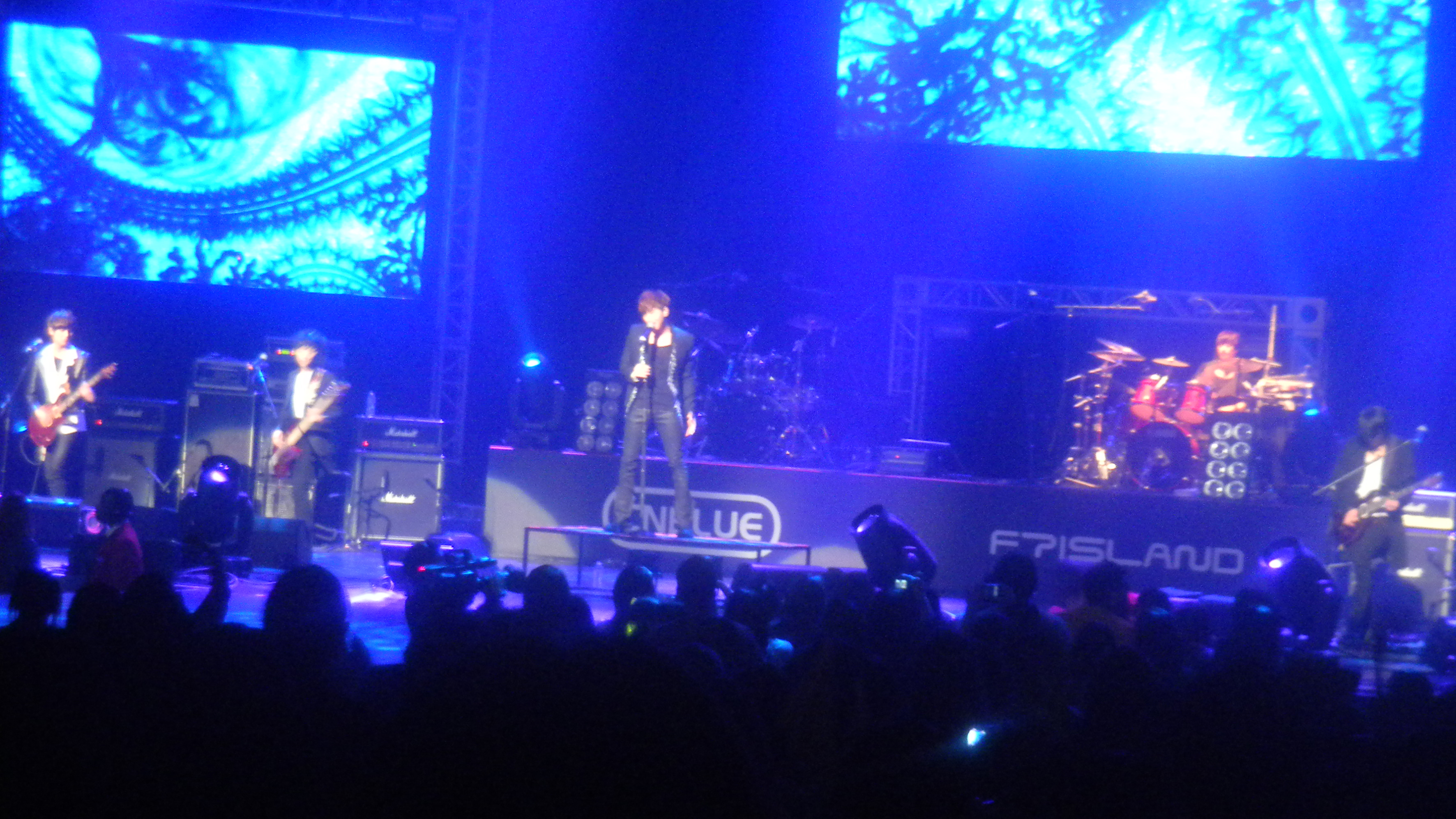
F.T. Island performing during their Stand Up concert at Nokia Theatre L.A. Live, March 9, 2012

On April 20, 2011, F.T. Island released their seventh Japanese single "Satisfaction". The single debuted at number two on the Oricon weekly singles charts, becoming the band's highest-charting single in the country. Their title song "Satisfaction" was also selected to be the ending theme song of Fuji Television's anime Toriko.

On May 18, F.T. Island released their first major debut album in Japan, entitled Five Treasure Island. The album features songs from their previous singles such as "Flower Rock", "Brand New Days", "So Today...", and "Satisfaction"; it also contains several new tracks, including the soundtracks for Japanese drama Muscle Girl!, in which member Hong-gi played the lead male role. The album ranked first at the Oricon album daily chart.

In late May, F.T. Island returned to the South Korean music scene after almost a year, with a mini-album titled Return. The album was released on May 24. Title track was "Hello Hello", a fast-paced rock song. The album featured five songs in total. "I Confess" featured all of the members' vocals.

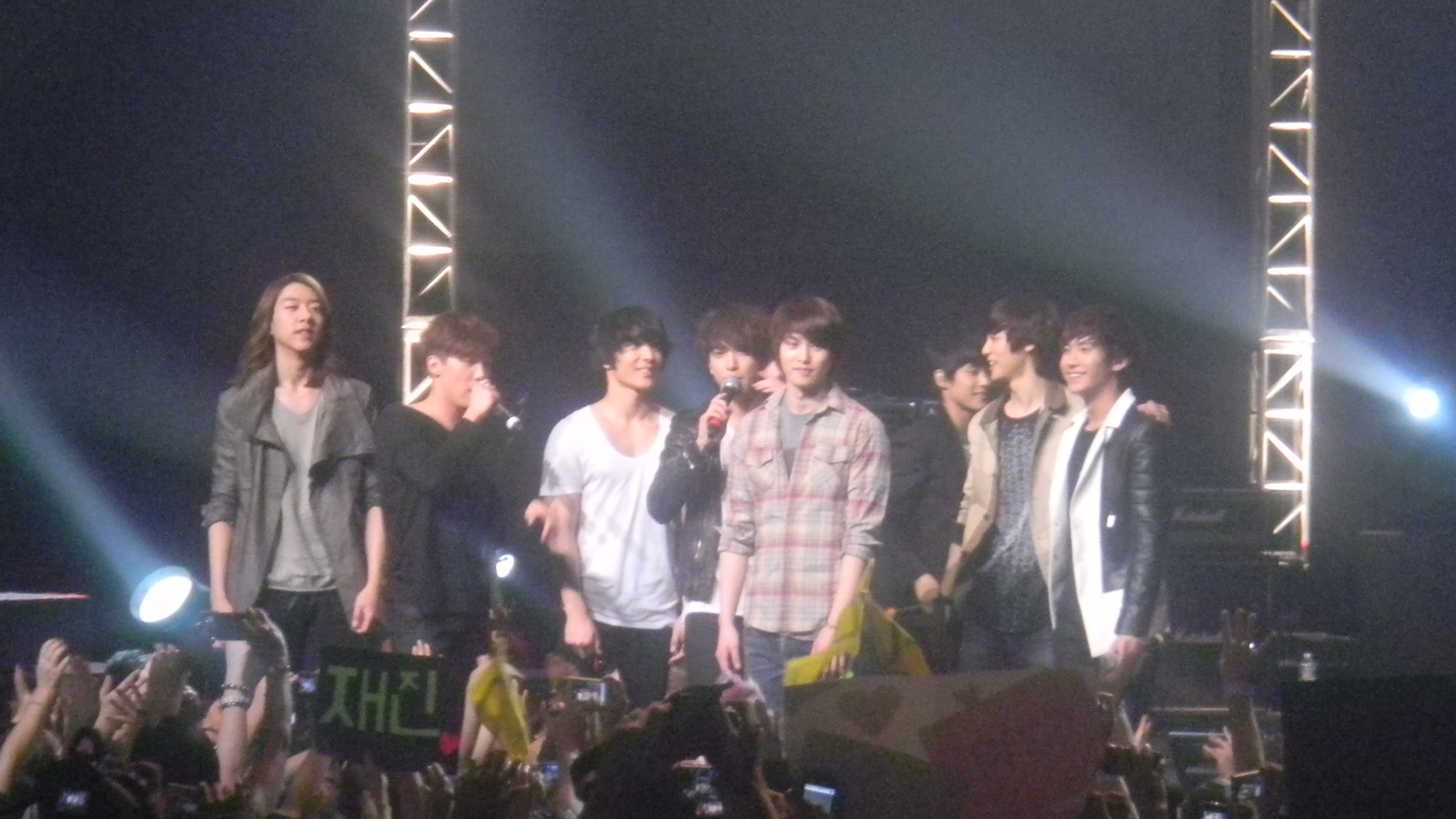
F.T. Island with CNBLUE during their Stand Up concert at Nokia Theatre L.A. Live, March 9, 2012

After releasing a tragic music video for their title track "Severely", F.T. Island released their fourth mini-album, entitled Grown-Up. Featuring five songs, it is composed of slow-tempo rock ballads. The album was released on January 31, 2012, and secured the No. 1 position on the Hanteo album chart for total album sales on both the daily and weekly charts, with title track "Severely" topping various online music charts. The album was completely sold out ten days after its release, recording some 50,000 copies sold. F.T. Island also achieved the "Triple Crown" recognition for "Severely" on JTBC's Music On Top. "Triple Crown" is a recognition for any artist who have won a music programme three times consecutively and the song would be removed from further trophies.

On March 9, F.T. Island and fellow labelmate CNBLUE performed in North America for the first time at Los Angeles' Nokia Theater.

In April, the band returned to Japan to promote their 7th Japanese single "Neverland", which was released on the 18th. “Neverland”, a fast tempo rock song, was chosen as the opening theme song of the animation Ozuma, a celebration of the 20th anniversary of Japanese broadcasting system WOWOW.

F.T. Island released their second studio Japanese album 20 [Twenty] on May 16, 2012. It debuted at number four on the weekly Oricon albums chart, selling 41,726 copies in its first week, earning the band their best first-week sales in Japan.

The same year, F.T. Island released their fourth South Korean studio album Five Treasure Box and its single "I Wish" on September 10. Within the first week of its release, the album sold over 30,000 copies in South Korea.

=== 2013–2014: Japanese album, overseas activities, comeback in Korea, individual promotions ===
The band continued their TAKE FTISLAND tour which started the year before in Seoul, Korea and went to Taiwan in December 2012 and continued the tour in Shanghai and Beijing, China.

On March 27, 2013, F.T. Island released their single, "You Are My Life" with 2 tracks, "Beat It" and "Come Into My Dream". All three songs ended up in the top 5 of Japanese music site Dwango's K-Pop weekly ringtone chart. Also, their M/V for "You Are My Life" took first on Chinese video site YinYueTai's Korea chart.

Later on April 9, the band's 2009 album Jump Up topped Taiwanese music charts for Korean and Japanese releases, with "Bad Woman" ranking first on the songs chart, as well.

The group released their Japanese album Rated-FT in June 2013, where members composed tracks such as "Time To", "Hold My Hand", "Black Chocolate" and "Orange Sky". The album charted at third on Japan's Oricon Daily Album Chart on the day it is released.

F.T. Island released their 11th Japanese single "Theory of Happiness" on July 24, 2013. It included two tracks composed by the members which were "Eyes On Me" and "Rainy Day" which both topped the Oricon Daily Chart.

The band became the first Korean band to perform three years in a row on Fuji TV's "Mezamashi Live!" on July 28, 2013. F.T. Island also performed live at rock festival, Summer Sonic 2013 in Tokyo on August 10 and in Osaka on August 11 which was their second appearance at the festival, after 2010. The band also completed their first Japan arena tour of seven cities, titled F.T. Island Arena Tour 2013 ~Freedom~, drawing an audience of 100,000.

F.T. Island returned to Korea in late September 2013, and released their self-composed mini-album Thanks To, dedicated to their fans and supporters. "Memory" and "Always With You" was composed by main singer Hong-gi, "Try Again" by Jong-hoon, and "Falling Star" by Jae-jin. They held a two-day concert in Seoul on 28 and 29 September, in front of 6000 fans. The concert was called "FTHX", combining the first initials of the band FT with THX (thanks). 'Memory' by Hong-gi ranked No.1 on the Taiwanese Omusic chart. "According to the Taiwanese G-Music Chart, F.T. Island’s 6th anniversary album ‘Thanks To’ ranked the weekly chart No. 1 recording 28.84% sales among Asian album sales."

Their Japanese Zepp Tour started on October 1, 2013, in Tokyo, and later performed in Sapporo, Osaka, Fukuoka, Shizuoka and Nagoya, as well.

The band made their official South Korean comeback with their fifth mini album The Mood on November 18, 2013. It topped the weekly Hanteo chart and Gaon chart; and ranked first on the online HMV chart in Japan for pre-released sales.

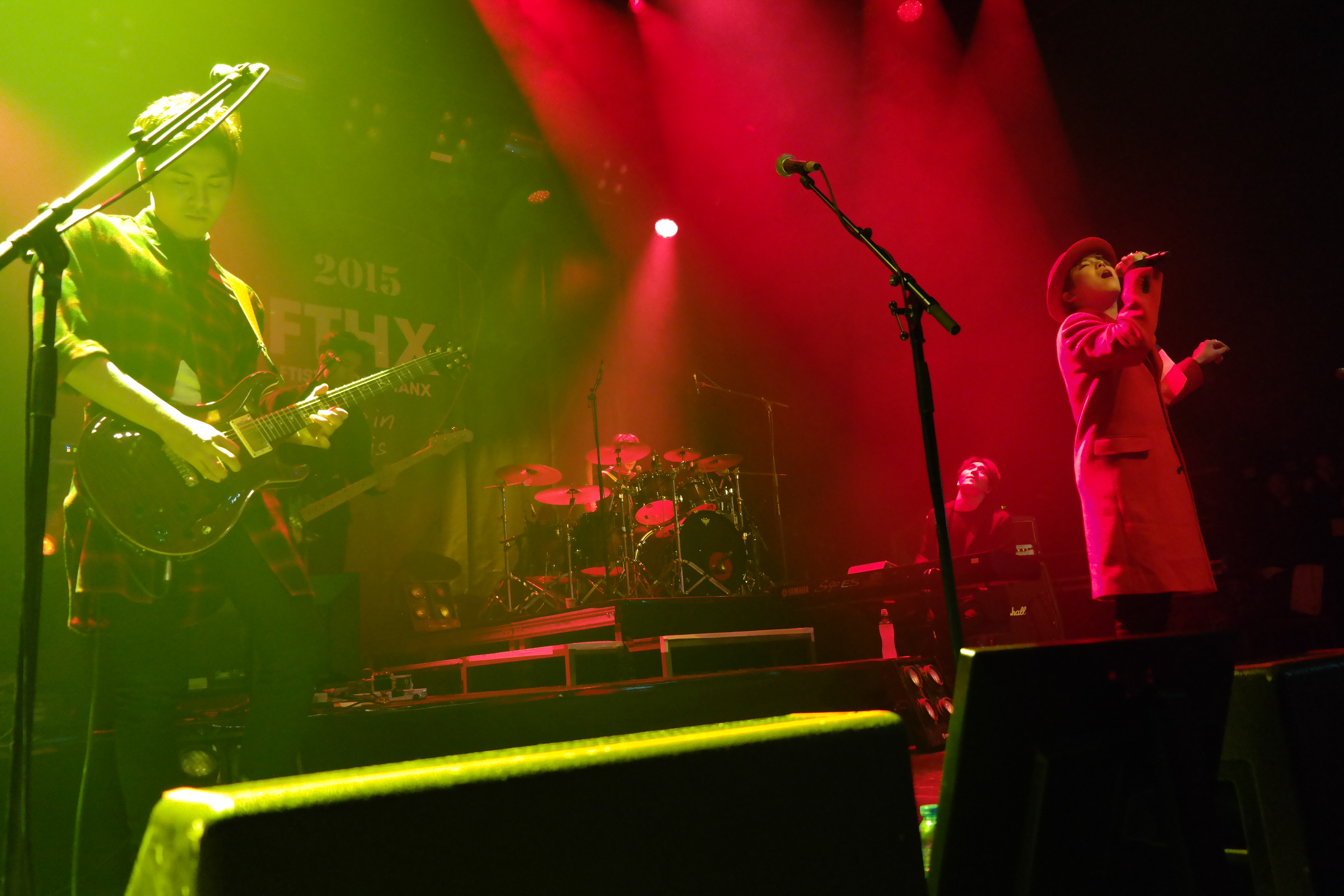
F.T. Island at La Cigale, Paris, in January 2015

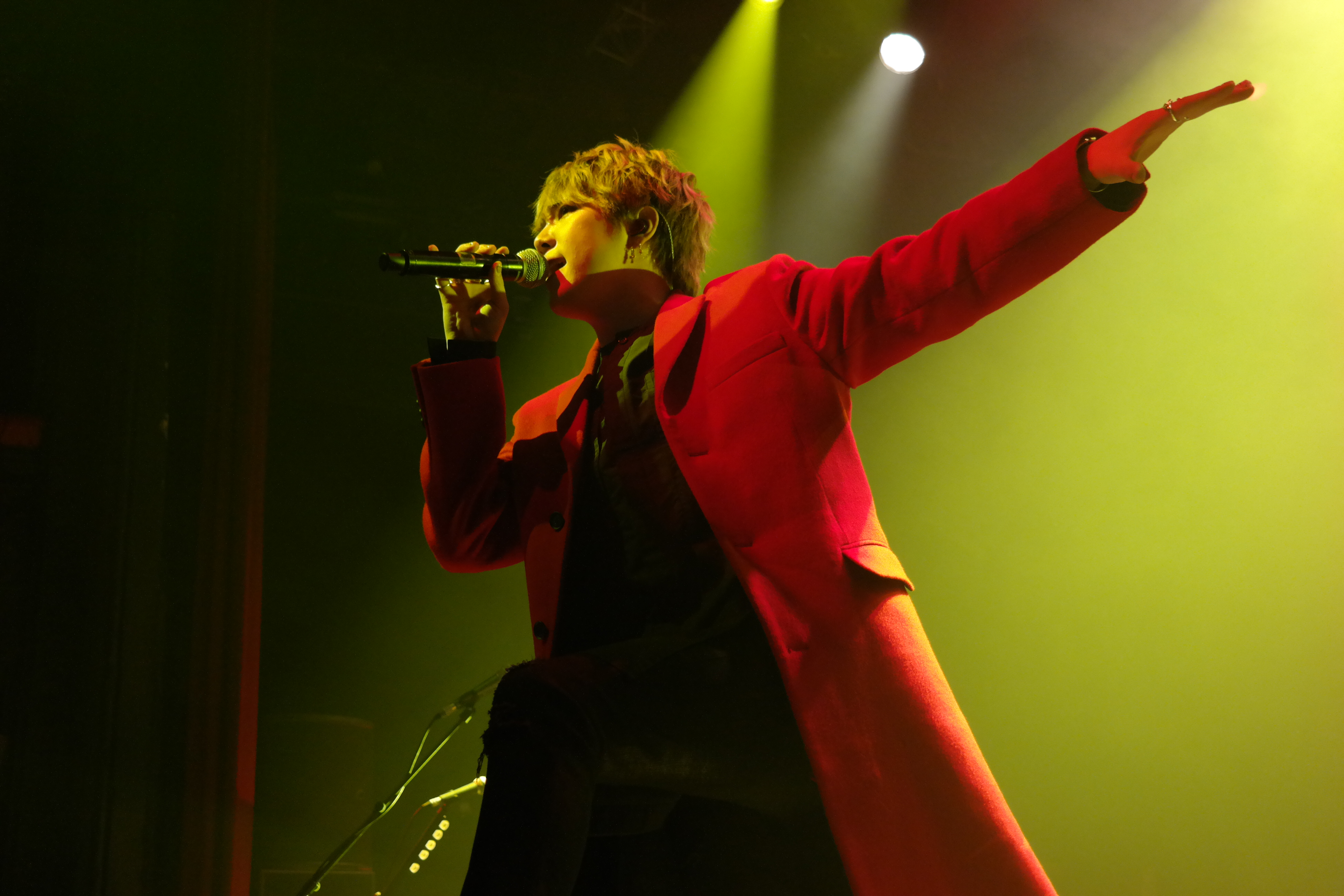
Main singer Lee Hong-gi at La Cigale

F.T. Island started 2014 with a concert in Shanghai which was part of their FTIsland’s 6th-anniversary tour. The band released multiple albums and singles in Japan. New Page was released in May 2014, it sold an estimated 22,000 copies worldwide and charted at 3rd on the Oricon Daily Charts and 6th on the Oricon Weekly Charts.

A few months later, F.T. Island then released a second album, titled Japan Best – All About in October with the title track "Be Free". It topped the Gaon physical album chart during October 5 and 11 periods, Tower Records Daily Pre-Order Charts and HMV Korean-Asia Daily Charts. It also achieved 8th position on the Gaon album chart for that month.

The band then released a new single, "To The Light" in October, which consists of three fully composed tracks. "Mitaiken Future" was released on March 16 and "Beautiful" on January 15. "Mitaiken Future" was later included in the album New Page. "Beautiful" charted at 4th position in Oricon's Daily Singles chart on the day same day when the album was released.

F.T. Island also held several tours and announced partnership with Taiwanese clothing brand, STAYREAL. They were invited and performed in one of China's most biggest music festival - Zebra Music Festival; where the band sang songs such as "Flower Rock" and "Freedom". Its ticket sales were also long sold out before the festival even started proving F.T. Island's immense popularity in China. Moreover, the band were also invited to perform in the Japanese MTV - Unplugged segment that only top artists could perform. Also, Hong-gi was also chosen to be the MC for M Countdown's 10th-anniversary special which proves the member's talent.

The members also promoted themselves individually throughout 2014. Min-hwan was cast in a musical Joseph and the Amazing Technicolour Dreamcoat, Seung-hyun collaborated with comedian Song Eun-i for Two Song Place and starred in the film, No One to Trust in the World. Hong-gi resumed filming Bride of the Century after his fall on an icy road. He also starred in the drama, Modern Farmer. and released his new accessory brand Skullhong. Hongstargram was also released as a travel book where he took pictures in his first solo tour in different countries. Jong-hoon was later announced in a new upcoming drama “Heroes”, said to premiere in 2015. He also launched his first Art Expedition In Japan where he showcased his artworks to the public. Jae-jin starred in Fashion Killa alongside Hong-gi as a special guest and also sang the title song for Bride of the Century, where member Hong-gi was starring in the drama.

=== 2015–present: Continued releases, members departure and military enlistment ===
F.T. Island started 2015 with concerts in France, Brazil, Chile, Mexico, and the US. I Will was released on March 23. The album peaked at 7th on the Billboard World Albums Chart in the second week of April. I Will also performed well on the Gaon Chart, peaking 1st in physical album ranking and 3rd on the Gaon Social Charts in the third week of March. F.T. Island sold 31,000 copies of the album peaking in 7th position for the highest number of album copies sold in the entire month of March. For "Pray", they were awarded the Most Popular Band in Asia. F.T. Island then toured China, Japan, Taiwan and more.

On the Japanese market, 5.....Go was released on May 13. The title song of the album, "Primavera" is a collaboration with Japanese rock singer Takahiro Moriuchi. "Puppy", a Japanese single, was released three months later and reached sixth position in Billboard's Japan Hot 100. F.T. Island then released the Korean version of the song. The band then held an autumn tour in 13 countries within 32 days.

In 2016, a Japanese studio album, N.W.U, was released on April 6. The album ranked first on the Japanese's Tower Record, which is the largest record store in Japan, and second on the Oricon daily album chart. It also topped the HMV Asia daily charts and K-pop charts for famous Japanese sound sources such as Dwango. The band performed in Osaka, Tokyo, and Aichi.

Their sixth Korean studio album, Where's the Truth?, was released on July 18. Where's the Truth? ranked 5th position on Billboard's World Album Charts. The album also charted at 1st in the Gaon Album Chart for the week of July 23.

"Just Do It" was released in July and topped HMV's Asian album chart, Amazon Japan's Asian pop chart, and landed in the top 3 on Tower Records' world music chart and hit No.5 on the Oricon Singles Chart. The song also came atop in Tower Records Japan for the top 10 K-pop singles and albums for the second week of September.

On March 14, 2019, Jong-hoon left the band and retired from the entertainment industry after being involved in the Burning Sun scandal, where he was part of a group chat in which some members shared videos of sexual activities recorded without the consent of the other party. Hong-gi began his mandatory military service on September 30, 2019, becoming the first F.T. Island member to enlist. On December 24, 2019, it was announced that Seung-hyun would leave the group and FNC following the end of his contract on December 31 in order to focus primarily on his acting career, while Hong-gi, Jae-jin, and Min-hwan renewed their contracts with their label. Jae-jin enlisted as an active duty soldier on January 21, 2020, while Min-hwan enlisted on February 24 as a reserve soldier. Hong-gi was discharged on April 18, 2021. Jae-jin was discharged on August 1, 2021. Min-hwan was discharged on September 2, 2021.

On April 25, 2022, FT Island will hold 'THE CON 2022: FT Island' at 6 PM on May 15, 2022 at the Jangchung Gymnasium in Jung-gu, Seoul. The show will be held after the 2019 concert held by FT Island before military service.

On July 16, 2022, it was announced that F.T. Island will hold another concert on August 20–21.

On January 29, 2026, it was announced that FT Island had renewed its contract with FNC Entertainment, followed by the company announcing it would create a "dedicated" team to support the band's future activities.

== Sub-unit ==
In 2009, Jong-hoon, Min-hwan, and Jae-jin formed a sub-group called F.T. Triple. Some of the reasons behind this lineup were to showcase more of the members' skills and to prevent main singer, Lee Hong-gi, from overstraining his voice again. Another reason was to continue promoting F.T. Island while Hong-gi was filming You're Beautiful while Seung-hyun was having a break.

At first, the trio was unofficially announced at the Dream Concert in Japan as "A3". They almost named themselves A3 because they all are of blood type 'A'. They also wanted to keep the F.T. name hence adding Triple at the end of it to represent a trio.

In F.T. Triple, Jae-jin originally in charge of bass for F.T. Island becomes a guitarist and the main vocalist; Jong-hoon plays the piano and Min-hwan continues to play the drums. Their first single was titled "Love Letter" and was released with F.T. Island's 2CD Repackaged Album Double Date and a second CD named Two Date that features all of F.T. Triple's songs.

== Members ==
Current members

- Lee Hong-gi – lead vocals (2007–present)
- Lee Jae-jin – bass guitar, guitars, vocals (2007–present)
- Choi Min-hwan – drums, percussion, vocals (2007–present; inactive 2024–2025)

Former members

- Oh Won-bin – guitars, vocals (2007–2009)
- Choi Jong-hoon – leader, guitars, keyboards (2007–2019)
- Song Seung-hyun – guitars, vocals (2009–2019)

=== Touring members ===
- Lee Euisu - guitars (2021–present)
- Kim Minsung - guitars (2021-2022)

== Discography ==
Korean albums

- Cheerful Sensibility (2007)
- Colorful Sensibility (2008)
- Cross & Change (2009)
- Five Treasure Box (2012)
- I Will (2015)
- Where's the Truth? (2016)
- Over 10 Years (2017)
- Serious (2024)

Japanese albums

- So Long, Au Revoir (2009)
- Five Treasure Island (2011)
- 20 [Twenty] (2012)
- Rated-FT (2013)
- New Page (2014)
- 5.....Go (2015)
- N.W.U (2016)
- United Shadows (2017)
- Planet Bonds (2018)
- Everlasting (2019)
- Instinct (2025)

== Filmography ==
- Cheongdam-dong 111 (2013–14)
- Coming Out FTIsland (2015)

== Awards and nominations ==
F.T. Island have won several major industry awards in South Korea, including several Golden Disk Awards, Mnet Asian Music Awards and Seoul Music Awards. They have also topped popular television music program charts like Inkigayo, M Countdown and Music Bank.
