= Song Seung-hyun =

South Korean actor and musician (born 1992)

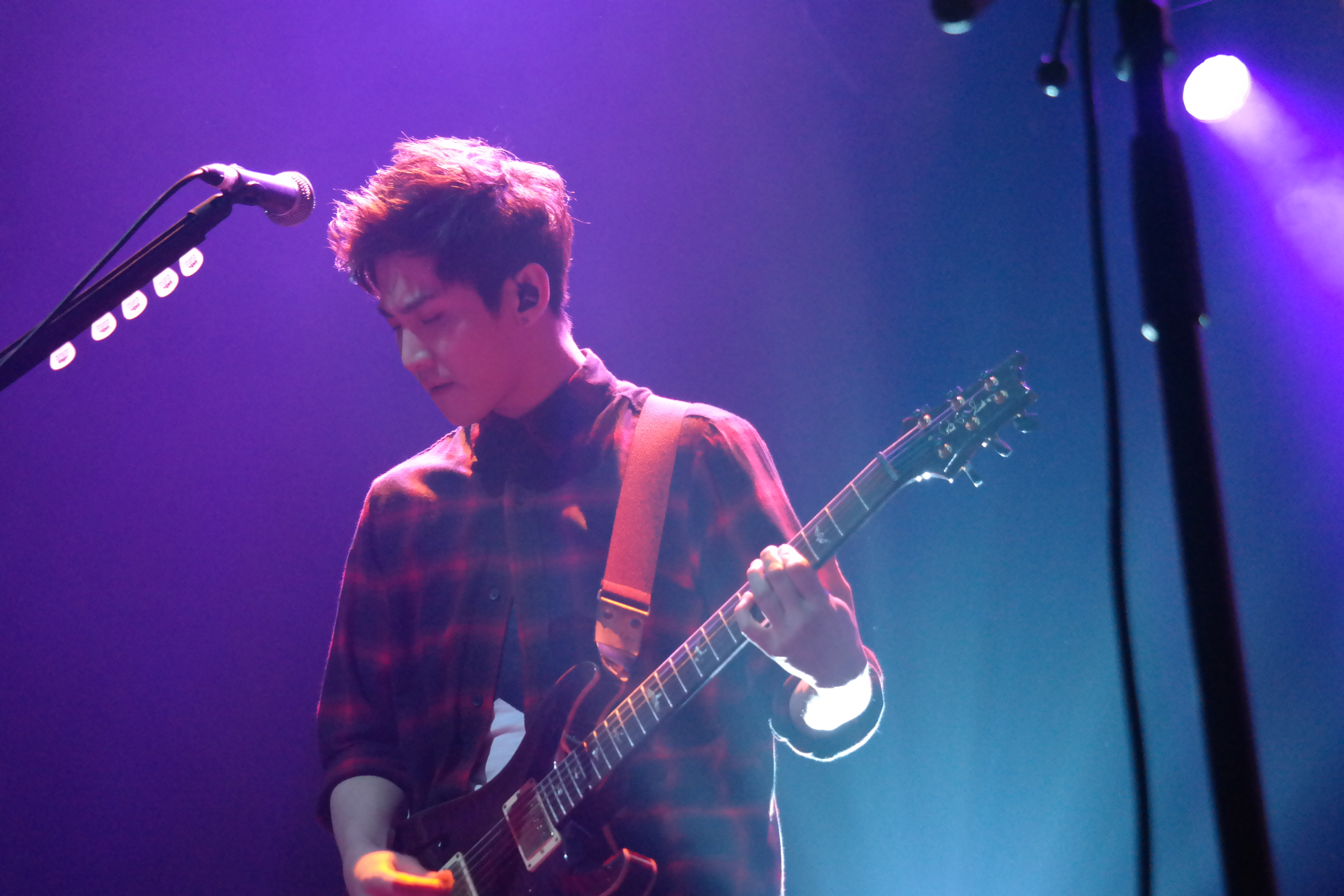
- Song in Paris, 2015
- Born: 21 August 1992 (age 34); Busan, South Korea
- Occupations: Actor; musician; singer
- Years active: 2009–2024
- Agent: Wooridle Company
- Spouse: Unknown (m. 2024)
- Musical career
- Genres: Rock; pop
- Instruments: Guitar; vocals; drums
- Years active: 2009–2019
- Labels: FNC; AI; Warner Japan
- Formerly of: F.T. Island

Song Seung-hyun (Korean: 송승현; Hanja: 宋承炫; Japanese:ソン•スンヒョン born 21 August 1992) is a former South Korean actor and musician. He is best known as a former member of the rock band F.T. Island, where he replaced previous guitarist Oh Won Bin and served as guitarist, vocalist, and songwriter. He departed from the group in 2020 to pursue his acting career.

== Career ==
=== 2009–2014: Debut with FT Island and solo activities ===
Song was a FNC trainee for 3 years before joining F.T. Island. He joined the band as a guitarist and backup vocalist after former member Oh Won Bin left the group. Right after joining FT Island as Oh Won Bin's replacement, "I Believe Myself" became the first single with member Song's vocal.

In 2009, Song appeared on SBS's variety show program Idol Maknae Rebellion ("아이돌 막내반란시대").

He also did a cameo in Style [Ep6] (SBS, 2009)

In 2012, Song made his musical debut on Jack the Ripper as Daniel. He performed for 8 days in Korea (Korea Haeorum Theater) and 3 days in Japan (Tokyo Aoyama Theater) His character Daniel, is one of the main characters who is part of an extremely sad romance. He begins a dangerous deal for the woman he loves. He was the youngest Daniel to be cast in 'Jack the Ripper'.

=== 2014–2024: Continued solo activities, new agency, and retirement ===
In January 2014, Song sang alongside Song Eun-yi forming the duo Two Song Place, releasing the single "Age-Height"

In 2016, Song was announced to be joining the cast of the web drama Detective Alice 2.

On 24 December 2019, FNC announced that Song would depart the group when his contract expires on 31 December to focus on his acting career.

In 2020, Song signed a new contract with acting agency Wooridle Company.

In February 2024, Song announced his retirement from the entertainment industry and his desire to leave South Korea to live a new life.

== Other activities ==
- With fellow band member Choi Jong-hoon, Seung hyun modeled at the 2009 Autumn Seoul Fashion Week on 17 October 2009 for Lee Ju Young, the designer of the "Resurrection" collection.
- With fellow band member Lee Hongki, Seunghyun becomes ambassadors for Gangwon Province. They introduced Gangwon-do by experiencing the place themselves. They went to Kyungpo Beach, Chamsori Museum, rode on rail bikes as well as the beach train at Jeongdongjin. The series of photoshoot by famous Japanese photographer, Shimokoshi Haruki, portrays the beauty and charm of Gangwon-do.

== Personal life ==
Song married his non-celebrity girlfriend on 8 June 2024.

== Filmography ==
=== Film ===
Year	Title	Role	Notes	Ref.
2014	The Youth	Lee Kyo-soo	Short film: Enemies All-Around	
TBA	Changhon: Night of Salvation	Hyeon-woo		

=== Television series ===
Year	Title	Role	Notes	Ref.
2009	Style	Himself	Cameo (with F.T. Island)	

=== Web series ===
Year	Title	Role	Ref.
2016	Investigator Alice 2	Ma Jung-soo	
2022	Oh! My Assistant	Seon-ho	

=== Television shows ===
Year	Title	Role	Notes	Ref.
2009	Idol Maknae Rebellion	Cast member		
2013–2014	Cheongdam-dong 111	Cast member		
2015	Coming Out FTISLAND	Cast member	with F.T. Island members	

== Musical ==
Year	Title	Role	Notes
2012	Jack the Ripper	Daniel	Main role
