= Choi Jong-hoon =

South Korean former musician (born 1990)

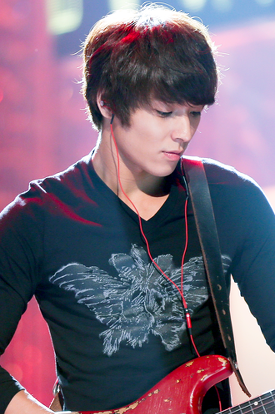
- Choi in 2012

Background information
- Born: March 7, 1990 (age 36); Seoul, South Korea
- Genres: Rock; pop; R&B; hard rock
- Occupations: Musician; actor
- Instruments: Guitar; keyboards; vocals
- Years active: 2007–2019
- Labels: FNC; AI; Warner Japan
- Formerly of: F.T. Island; F.T. Triple
- Website: fncent.com
- Criminal information
- Status: released
- Convictions: Gang rape, illegal filming
- Penalty: 2 years in prison

Details
- Date: November 2015 – June 2016
- Date apprehended: March 21, 2019

Korean name
- Hangul: 최종훈
- RR: Choe Jonghun
- MR: Ch'oe Chonghun

Choi Jong-hoon (Korean: 최종훈; born March 7, 1990) is a South Korean former musician and actor who was convicted in 2019 for gang rape and illegally filming and distributing videos of his crimes.

He served as the leader, guitarist, and keyboardist of rock band F.T. Island from its debut in 2007 until his exit from the entertainment industry in March 2019 after admitting to secretly filming and sharing sexual videos of women without their consent. He was convicted in November 2019 for the gang rape of two different women on two occasions together with Jung Joon-young.

Choi subsequently retired from the entertainment industry after being involved in bribery and sharing of illicit sex videos and pictures, a part of the Jung Joon-young KakaoTalk chatrooms, first revealed in the Burning Sun scandal. On November 29, 2019, Choi was found guilty of rape and sentenced to five years in prison.

== Early life and education ==
Choi Jong-hoon was born in Seoul, South Korea on March 7, 1990, During his high school years, he was accepted into the FNC Music talent agency, which later formed the band F.T. Island with Jong-hoon as its leader and guitarist.

Choi attended Kyonggi University, majoring in digital music alongside former band member Oh Won Bin.

== Career ==
=== Music career ===
In January 2009, members Choi Jong-hoon, Choi Minhwan, and Lee Jaejin were put into the sub group "A3". This group debuted at the 2009 New Year concert "My First Dream" held at the JCB Hall in Tokyo, Japan on January 2, 2009. Choi performed as the guitarist and a sub-vocalist. The group's name was "A3" due to each of the three members having type A blood. This group was formed to help take up some singing time during their concerts, so that lead singer, Lee Hong-gi, would not overstrain his voice.

In 2019, Choi's agency announced that he will be leaving F.T. Island and retiring from the entertainment industry, following public demands for his departure as allegations of sexual crimes were coming to light.

=== Television and acting ===
Choi began making cameos and guest appearances on many television series starting in 2008. Together with Song Seung-hyun, he starred in Style Wave in December 2009 and January 2010. In this show, stars discuss major style trends and dress a shopper according to a chosen style theme.

Choi participated in episode 15 of Seoul Broadcasting System's Idol Maknae Rebellion (아이돌 막내반란시대) with fellow band member Seung-hyun, who was a cast member of the show; the episode aired on February 15, 2010. He made his acting debut as a supporting character in the film You're My Pet (2011) starring actors Jang Keun-suk and Kim Ha-neul. Based on the Japanese manga Tramps Like Us, Choi plays the younger brother of Kim's character. The film centers around a woman living with her human pet.

In December 2012, Choi joined the second season of tvN's The Romantic & Idol.

Choi was cast as the lead character Park Shi-hyun in the web drama Prince's Prince (2015). Seo Yu-na of girl group AOA, who plays his onscreen younger sister Yu-na, Lim Yoon-ho as Lee Mong-ryong, also played co-leads. Based on the webtoon of the same name, the series revolves around Shi-hyun's sister and her immersion into video games. As a first-time lead role, Choi remarked during a press conference prior to filming, "I previously did a bit of acting, but I should carefully and cautiously undertake this role". He also starred in the drama Heroes and Unexpected Heroes (2017).

=== Other activities ===
With fellow band member Song Seung-hyun, Choi modeled at the 2009 Autumn Seoul Fashion Week on October 17, 2009 for Lee Ju Young, the designer of the "Resurrection" collection. On June 29, 2009, he was featured with Core Contents Media's soloist Hong Jin Young as one of the main characters in her music video "Love Battery". In August, he participated in episode 19 of MNet Scandal.

== Criminal convictions ==
=== Allegations and departure ===
In March 2019, Choi was revealed to be a member of an online group chat that shared sexually explicit videos of women filmed without their knowledge or consent, together with celebrities Lee Jong-hyun and Jung Joon-young. He was also reported to have bribed the police in order to prevent newspapers from covering a drunk driving incident he was involved in 2016. Subsequently, his agency announced that he will be leaving F.T. Island and retiring from the entertainment industry.

In April 2019, police booked Choi for illegally filming women without their consent, distributing a total of six videos, and bribery to cover up his drunk-driving incident. On April 11, 2019, Choi admitted to spreading hidden camera photos taken without consent and also filming illegal hidden camera footage. He was charged with one count of sharing personally taken illegal footage and five counts of sharing footage from other sources.

=== Sentence to prison ===
On April 19, 2019, a woman came forward to SBS funE, claiming that five men including Choi, had raped her after she was intoxicated in March 2016, and then shared the footage in a group chat. Choi denied the allegation, but admitted that he and the woman were together on that day. On May 10, 2019, Choi was arrested on the gang rape allegations and was indicted on charge of taking part in a gang rape in 2016.

On November 29, 2019, a Seoul District Court sentenced Choi to five years in prison and Jung Jong-hoon to six years for also filming the rape and sharing the footage. The verdict said that "Jung and Choi took part in gang-rape of victims who were intoxicated and unable to resist. It is hard to fathom the extent of suffering the victims must have gone through”. The court said the 30-year-old "did not feel remorse after mass-raping drunken victims".

Furthermore, on March 27, 2020 Choi was sentenced by the same Seoul court to an additional one year in jail, suspended for two years, after being found guilty of filming and photographing his rape victims naked, sharing the footage in mobile chat rooms, and for attempting to bribe a police officer 2 million won (US$1,650) to cover up his February 2016 drunk driving incident. Choi was also ordered to undergo 80 hours of sex offender treatment and barred him from employment at children and youth facilities for five years.

On May 12, 2020, on appeal, Seoul High Court reduced his sentence from five years to two and half years, as Choi had submitted letters of compensation agreements with his rape victims. On November 8, 2021, it was reported that Choi was released from prison.

In 2024, it was revealed that Choi Jong-Hoon’s friend Goo Hara had a pivotal role in the investigation of reporter Kang Kyung-yoon into the KakaoTalk chatrooms, in which rape videos were being shared. Goo was aware that he could be part of the rape scandal and convinced him over the phone to reveal the identity of Yoon Gyu-geun, the Seoul Metropolitan Police Agency officer who chatroom members referred to as the "police chief" that "watched their backs".

== Filmography ==
=== Television series ===
Year	Network	Title	Role	Notes
2008	SBS	On Air	Himself	Cameo (Ep. 1)
2009	SBS	Style	Himself	Cameo (Ep. 6)
2012–2013	tvN	Romantic & Idol Season 2	Himself	Cast member
2013–2014	tvN	Cheongdam-dong 111	Himself	Reality show
2015	Naver TV cast, KBS2	Prince's Prince	Park Shi-hyun	Lead role, web drama
2015	JTBC	Heroes	Choi Hee-yeol	Lead role
2017	SBS	Law of the Jungle	Himself	Sumatra Guest (Ep. 261 - 264)
2017	Naver TV Cast	Unexpected Heroes	Min Su-ho	Web-drama
2018	MBN	Real Life Men and Women	Himself	Cast member

=== Film ===
Year	Title	Role	Notes
2011	You're My Pet	Ji Eun-soo	Supporting role

=== Music video appearances ===
Year	Title	Artist	Ref.
2015	"Already Winter"	Vromance feat. Huh Gak	

== Discography ==
=== Guest appearances ===
Title	Year	Album
"Wish Ver.2" (소망 Ver.2; Somang Ver.2)	2009	Errand

== See also ==
- Jung Joon-young KakaoTalk chatrooms scandal
- Burning Sun scandal
- Molka, taking visual images without consent
