= Jung Kook discography =

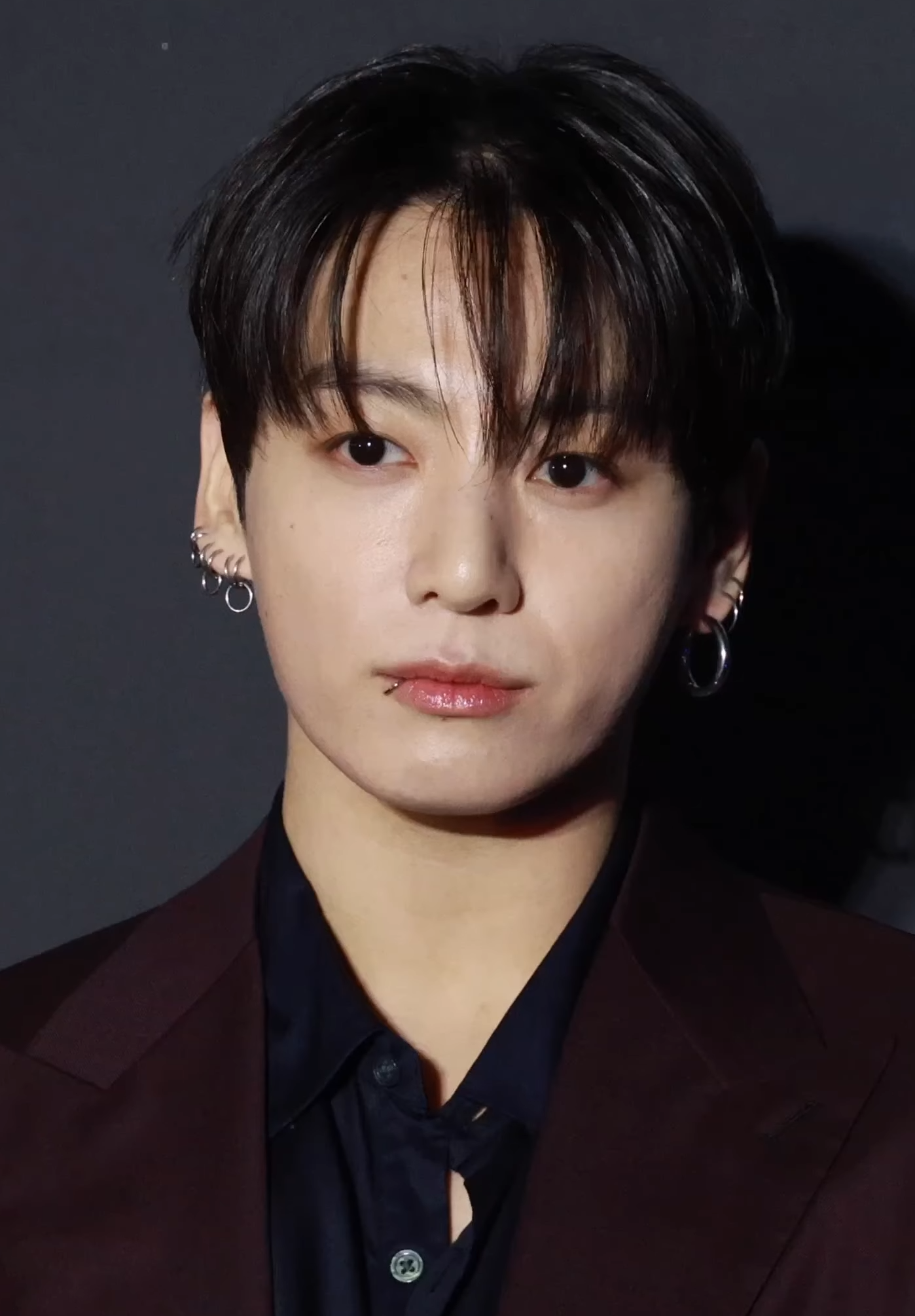
- Jung Kook in 2026
- Studio albums: 1
- Singles: 12
- Music videos: 9

South Korean singer Jung Kook has released one studio album and twelve singles. As a member of South Korean boy band BTS, he performed the solo songs "Begin", "Euphoria", and "My Time" for the band and recorded the soundtrack song "Stay Alive" for the BTS-based webtoon 7Fates: Chakho. In 2022, he featured on American singer Charlie Puth's single "Left and Right" and released the single "Dreamers" for the FIFA World Cup soundtrack.

Jung Kook made his official solo debut in 2023 with the single "Seven" featuring Latto, which debuted at number one on the Billboard Hot 100, the Global 200, and the Global Excl. U.S. charts, making him the first Korean solo artist to do so. His follow-up single "3D", featuring Jack Harlow, debuted at number one on the Global 200 and Global Excl. U.S., and number five on the Hot 100 and the UK Singles Chart, making Jung Kook the first South Korean solo artist to achieve two consecutive top-five entries on the latter. His third single "Standing Next to You" also debuted at number one on the Global 200 and Global Excl. U.S. and at number five on the Hot 100. All three singles supported his debut studio album, Golden (2023), which sold over 2.7 million copies worldwide, debuted atop the South Korean, Belgian, French, Lithuanian, and Japanese album charts, and reached the top 10 in 14 countries including the US Billboard 200.

== Studio albums ==
List of studio albums, showing selected details, peak chart positions and sales
Title	Details	Peak chart positions										Sales	Certifications
Title	Details	KOR	AUS	CAN	FRA	GER	ITA	JPN	NZ	UK	US	Sales	Certifications
Golden	Release date: November 3, 2023; Label: Big Hit; Formats: CD, LP, digital download, streaming	1	2	4	1	6	3	1	2	3	2	KOR: 2,821,695; JPN: 258,724; US: 244,000	KMCA: 2× Million (Note: Regular edition); KMCA: 2× Platinum (Note: Weverse Albums edition); BPI: Gold; FIMI: Gold; MC: Platinum (Note: Shine version); RIAJ: Platinum; SNEP: Gold

== Singles ==
=== As lead artist ===
Title	Year	Peak chart positions										Sales	Certifications	Album
Title	Year	KOR	AUS	CAN	JPN Hot	NZ	UK	US	US World	VIE	WW	Sales	Certifications	Album
"Like A Star" with RM)	2013	—	—	—	—	—	—	—	—	—	—			data-sort-value="" style="background: var(--background-color-interactive, #ececec); color: var(--color-base, inherit); vertical-align: middle; text-align: center; " class="table-na" | Non-album single
"Perfect Christmas" (with Jo Kwon, Lim Jeong-hee, Joohee, and RM)	2013	45	—	—	—	—	—	—	—	—	—	KOR: 64,789		data-sort-value="" style="background: var(--background-color-interactive, #ececec); color: var(--color-base, inherit); vertical-align: middle; text-align: center; " class="table-na" | Non-album single
"Still with You"	2020	27	—	— (Note: "Still with You" did not enter the Canadian Hot 100, but peaked at number nine on the Canadian Digital Song Sales chart.)	30	— (Note: "Still with You" did not enter the NZ Top 40 Singles Chart, but peaked at number 12 on the NZ Hot Singles Chart.)	—	— (Note: "Still with You" did not enter the Billboard Hot 100, but peaked at number six on the Digital Song Sales chart.)	1	13	62	JPN: 20,487	MC: Gold	data-sort-value="" style="background: var(--background-color-interactive, #ececec); color: var(--color-base, inherit); vertical-align: middle; text-align: center; " class="table-na" | Non-album single
"Stay Alive"	2022	68	—	74	44	— (Note: "Stay Alive" did not enter the NZ Top 40 Singles Chart, but peaked at number six on the NZ Hot Singles Chart.)	89	95	1	1	13	JPN: 15,852; US: 14,900; WW: 30,400		data-sort-value="" style="background: var(--background-color-interactive, #ececec); color: var(--color-base, inherit); vertical-align: middle; text-align: center; " class="table-na" | Non-album single
"My You"	2022	145	—	— (Note: "My You" did not enter the Canadian Hot 100, but peaked at number 13 on the Canadian Digital Song Sales chart.)	37	— (Note: "Still with You" did not enter the NZ Top 40 Singles Chart, but peaked at number 27 on the NZ Hot Singles Chart.)	—	— (Note: "My You" did not enter the Billboard Hot 100, but peaked at number 10 on the Digital Song Sales chart.)	2	31	158	JPN: 19,307		data-sort-value="" style="background: var(--background-color-interactive, #ececec); color: var(--color-base, inherit); vertical-align: middle; text-align: center; " class="table-na" | Non-album single
"Dreamers"	2022	7	—	90	6	— (Note: "Dreamers" did not enter the NZ Top 40 Singles Chart, but peaked at number three on the NZ Hot Singles Chart.)	—	— (Note: "Dreamers" did not enter the Billboard Hot 100, but peaked at number 10 on the Bubbling Under Hot 100.)	1	2	9	JPN: 19,525; WW: 48,000		FIFA World Cup 2022 Official Soundtrack
"Seven" (featuring Latto)	2023	2	2	5	2	2	3	1	—	1	1	JPN: 49,432; US: 228,000; WW: 305,000	KMCA: Platinum (Note: Certification for streaming (Clean version)); BPI: Platinum; MC: 4× Platinum; RIAA: Platinum; RIAJ: Platinum (Note: Certification for streaming); RMNZ: Platinum	Golden
"3D" (featuring Jack Harlow)	2023	8	7	10	7	9	5	5	—	2	1	JPN: 20,187; US: 87,000; WW: 119,000	BPI: Silver; MC: 2× Platinum; RIAJ: Gold (Note: Certification for streaming); RMNZ: Gold	Golden
"Too Much" (with the Kid Laroi and Central Cee)	2023	94	10	32	— (Note: "Too Much" did not enter the Billboard Japan Hot 100, but peaked at number three on the Hot Overseas chart.)	37	10	44	—	14	11	JPN: 3,748	MC: Gold	The First Time
"Standing Next to You"	2023	6	33	30	12	25	6	5	—	4	1	JPN: 6,617; US: 163,000; WW: 121,000	BPI: Silver; MC: 2× Platinum; RIAJ: Gold (Note: Certification for streaming); RMNZ: Gold	Golden
"Never Let Go"	2024	52	—	—	33	— (Note: "Never Let Go" did not enter the NZ Top 40 Singles Chart, but peaked at number 11 on the NZ Hot Singles Chart.)	60	97	—	—	20	JPN: 16,331		Non-album single
"Yes or No"	2024	62	—	—	—	— (Note: "Yes or No" did not enter the NZ Top 40 Singles Chart, but peaked at number 5 on the NZ Hot Singles Chart.)	— (Note: "Yes or No" did not enter the UK Singles Chart, but peaked at number 40 on the UK Singles Downloads Chart.)	— (Note: "Yes or No" did not enter the Billboard Hot 100, but peaked at number 4 on the Bubbling Under Hot 100.)	—	32	23	JPN: 1,985	MC: Gold	Golden
"—" denotes releases that did not chart or were not released in that region

=== As featured artist ===
Title	Year	Peak chart positions										Sales	Certifications	Album
Title	Year	KOR	AUS	CAN	HUN	JPN Hot	NZ	UK	US	VIE	WW	Sales	Certifications	Album
"Left and Right" (Charlie Puth featuring Jung Kook)	2022	15	19	17	3	13	15	41	22	1	5	JPN: 12,820; WW: 45,000	RIAA: Gold; ARIA: Platinum; BPI: Silver; MC: 2× Platinum; RIAJ: Gold (Note: Certification for streaming); RMNZ: Platinum	Charlie

== Other charted songs ==
Title	Year	Peak chart positions										Sales	Certifications	Album
Title	Year	KOR	CAN	HUN	JPN Dig.	JPN Hot	NZ Hot	UK Down.	US	US World	WW	Sales	Certifications	Album
"Begin" (Note: credited under BTS but is a solo performed by Jung Kook)	2016	27	—	—	—	—	—	—	—	1	—	KOR: 90,526		Wings
"Euphoria"	2018	11	86	9	—	76	9	45	— (Note: "Euphoria" did not enter the Billboard Hot 100, but peaked at number five on the Bubbling Under Hot 100 Singles chart.)	1	—	US: 15,000	RIAJ: Platinum (Note: Certification for streaming)	Love Yourself: Answer
"My Time"	2020	21	—	20	—	—	12	—	84	1	—	US: 24,000		Map of the Soul: 7
"Seven" (Explicit) (featuring Latto)	2023	47	—	—	4	—	—	—	—	—	—	JPN: 14,761		Golden
"Seven" (Instrumental) (featuring Latto)	2023	— (Note: "Seven" (Instrumental) did not enter the Circle Digital Chart, but peaked at number 50 on the component Download Chart.)	—	—	15	— (Note: "Seven" (Instrumental) did not enter the Billboard Japan Hot 100, but peaked at number 16 on the component Download Songs chart.)	—	—	—	—	—	JPN: 3,307		Seven (Weekday Ver.)
"Seven" (Summer Mix) (featuring Latto)	2023	— (Note: "Seven" (Band version) did not enter the Circle Digital Chart, but peaked at number 62 on the component Download Chart.)	—	—	19	— (Note: "Seven" (Summer Mix) did not enter the Billboard Japan Hot 100, but peaked at number 22 on the component Download Songs chart.)	—	—	—	—	—	JPN: 2,746		Seven (Weekday Ver.)
"Seven" (Band version) (featuring Latto)	2023	— (Note: "Seven" (Band version) did not enter the Circle Digital Chart, but peaked at number 68 on the component Download Chart.)	—	—	27	— (Note: "Seven" (Band version) did not enter the Billboard Japan Hot 100, but peaked at number 31 on the component Download Songs chart.)	—	—	—	—	—	JPN: 1,941		Seven (Weekday Ver.)
"Seven" (Island Mix) (featuring Latto)	2023	— (Note: "Seven" (Island Mix) did not enter the Circle Digital Chart, but peaked at number 138 on the component Download Chart.)	—	—	—	—	—	—	—	—	—			Seven (Weekend Ver.)
"Seven" (Nightfall Mix) (featuring Latto)	2023	— (Note: "Seven" (Nightfall Mix) did not enter the Circle Digital Chart, but peaked at number 130 on the component Download Chart.)	—	—	—	—	—	—	—	—	—			Seven (Weekend Ver.)
"Seven" (Festival Mix) (featuring Latto)	2023	— (Note: "Seven" (Festival Mix) did not enter the Circle Digital Chart, but peaked at number 135 on the component Download Chart.)	—	—	—	—	—	—	—	—	—			Seven (Weekend Ver.)
"Seven" (Lo-fi Mix) (featuring Latto)	2023	— (Note: "Seven" (Lo-fi Mix) did not enter the Circle Digital Chart, but peaked at number 133 on the component Download Chart.)	—	—	—	—	—	—	—	—	—			Seven (Weekend Ver.)
"Seven" (Alesso Remix) (featuring Latto)	2023	— (Note: "Seven" (Alesso Remix) did not enter the Circle Digital Chart, but peaked at number 90 on the component Download Chart.)	—	—	28	—	—	—	—	—	—	JPN: 1,856		Non-album song
"3D" (Instrumental) (featuring Jack Harlow)	2023	— (Note: "3D" (Instrumental) did not enter the Circle Digital Chart, but peaked at number 49 on the component Download Chart.)	—	—	47	—	—	—	—	—	—	JPN: 1,190		3D: The Remixes
"3D" (Alternate version)	2023	— (Note: "3D" (Alternate version) did not enter the Circle Digital Chart, but peaked at number 32 on the component Download Chart.)	—	—	7	—	—	—	—	—	—	JPN: 6,134		3D: The Remixes
"Too Much" (Clean version) (with the Kid Laroi and Central Cee)	2023	—	—	—	40	—	—	—	—	—	—	JPN: 1,160		The First Time
"3D" (A. G. Cook Remix) (featuring Jack Harlow)	2023	— (Note: "3D" (A. G. Cook Remix) did not enter the Circle Digital Chart, but peaked at number 98 on the component Download Chart.)	—	—	—	—	—	—	—	—	—			3D: The Remixes
"3D" (Clean version) (featuring Jack Harlow)	2023	— (Note: "3D" (Clean version) did not enter the Circle Digital Chart, but peaked at number 84 on the component Download Chart.)	—	—	—	—	—	—	—	—	—			3D: The Remixes
"3D" (Sped up) (featuring Jack Harlow)	2023	— (Note: "3D" (Sped up) did not enter the Circle Digital Chart, but peaked at number 133 on the component Download Chart.)	—	—	—	—	—	—	—	—	—			3D: The Remixes
"3D" (Slowed down) (featuring Jack Harlow)	2023	— (Note: "3D" (Slowed down) did not enter the Circle Digital Chart, but peaked at number 135 on the component Download Chart.)	—	—	—	—	—	—	—	—	—			3D: The Remixes
"Seven" (David Guetta Remix) (featuring Latto)	2023	— (Note: "Seven" (David Guetta Remix) did not enter the Circle Digital Chart, but peaked at number 137 on the component Download Chart.)	—	—	—	—	—	—	—	—	—			Non-album song
"Closer to You" (featuring Major Lazer)	2023	88	—	—	39	—	—	58	—	—	52	JPN: 1,585		Golden
"Please Don't Change" (featuring DJ Snake)	2023	92	—	—	41	—	9	63	—	—	46	JPN: 1,544		Golden
"Hate You"	2023	70	—	—	29	—	8	45	— (Note: "Hate You" did not enter the Billboard Hot 100, but peaked at number 7 on the Bubbling Under Hot 100.)	—	31	JPN: 2,016		Golden
"Somebody"	2023	96	—	—	46	—	—	61	—	—	57	JPN: 1,507		Golden
"Too Sad to Dance"	2023	84	—	—	31	—	—	57	—	—	58	JPN: 1,888		Golden
"Shot Glass of Tears"	2023	97	—	—	43	—	—	47	— (Note: "Shot Glass of Tears" did not enter the Billboard Hot 100, but peaked at number 10 on the Bubbling Under Hot 100.)	—	51	JPN: 1,530		Golden
"3D" (Justin Timberlake Remix)	2023	— (Note: "3D" (Justin Timberlake Remix) did not enter the Circle Digital Chart, but peaked at number 51 on the component Download Chart.)	—	—	18	—	15	—	—	—	—	JPN: 2,159		Non-album song
"Standing Next to You" (Usher Remix)	2023	— (Note: "Standing Next to You" (Usher Remix) did not enter the Circle Digital Chart, but peaked at number 53 on the component Download Chart.)	—	—	15	—	13	—	—	—	—	JPN: 2,849		Coming Home
"I Wonder..." (with J-Hope)	2024	—	—	—	15	—	31	—	—	2	—	JPN: 2,581		Hope on the Street Vol. 1
"—" denotes releases that did not chart or were not released in that region

== Other songs ==
List of non-single songs, showing year released and other performing artists
Title	Year	Other artist(s)	Album	Ref.
"One Dream One Korea"	2015	Various artists		
"I Know"	2016	RM		
"I'm in Love"	2016	Lady Jane		

== Writing and production credits ==
All song credits are adapted from the Korea Music Copyright Association's (KOMCA) database, unless otherwise noted.

Key
†	Indicates a production credit also

Name of song, featured performers, original release, and year of release
Song	Artist(s)	Album	Year
"2.0"	BTS	Arirang	2026
"Aliens"	BTS	Arirang	2026
"Dead Leaves" (Note: or "Autumn Leaves")	BTS	The Most Beautiful Moment in Life, Pt. 2	2015
"Dreamers"	Jung Kook, Fahad Al Kubaisi	FIFA World Cup 2022 Official Soundtrack	2022
"Dreamers" (Live version)	Jung Kook, Al Kubaisi	FIFA World Cup 2022 Official Soundtrack (Note: KOMCA attributes this version of the song to the soundtrack album though it is not actually part of the tracklist.)	2022
"Film Out"	BTS	BTS, the Best	2021
"Fya"	BTS	Arirang	2026
"Hooligan"	BTS	Arirang	2026
"I Need U" (Demo version)	BTS	Proof	2022
"In the Soop"	BTS	—N/a	2020
"Introduction: Youth"	BTS	Youth	2016
"Love Is Not Over" †	BTS	The Most Beautiful Moment in Life: Young Forever	2016
"Magic Shop" †	BTS	Love Yourself: Tear	2018
"My Time"	BTS	Map of the Soul: 7	2020
"My You" †	Jung Kook	Non-album single	2022
"Never Let Go"	Jung Kook	Non-album single	2024
"No More Dream"	BTS	2 Cool 4 Skool	2013
"Outro: Circle Room Cypher"	BTS	2 Cool 4 Skool	2013
"Outro: Love Is Not Over" †	BTS	The Most Beautiful Moment in Life, Pt. 1	2015
"Outro: The Journey"	BTS	Map of the Soul: 7 – The Journey	2020
"Run"	BTS	The Most Beautiful Moment in Life, Pt. 2	2015
"Run BTS"	BTS	Proof	2022
"Skit"	BTS	Be	2020
"Stay"	BTS	Be	2020
"Still With You" †	Jung Kook	Non-album single	2020
"Still With You" (A cappella) †	Jung Kook	Proof	2022
"Telepathy"	BTS	Be	2020
"We Are Bulletproof Pt. 2"	BTS	2 Cool 4 Skool	2013
"Your Eyes Tell"	BTS	Map of the Soul: 7 – The Journey	2020

== Music videos ==
Name of music video, year released, other credited artist(s), director, and additional notes
Title	Year	Other performer(s) credited	Director(s)	Description	Ref.
"Perfect Christmas"	2013	Jo Kwon, Lim Jeong-hee, Joo Hee, and RM	Unknown		
"Euphoria: Theme of Love Yourself Wonder"	2018	None	Yong-seok Choi (Lumpens)	A nine minute-long video released in promotion of the second album in BTS' Love Yourself series. The clip opens with V jumping into the ocean, followed by a variety of dark scenes involving the other band members, including Jung Kook being beaten up. Jin is shown recalling memories of the seven together in happier times. "Euphoria" serves as the soundtrack for the latter part of the video, which shows the septet playing around together in a run-down factory yard then at the seaside where V jumped in the beginning. At the end, Jin peers into a video camera and smiles. V is shown in the water.	
"Stay Alive"	2022	None	—N/a	Comprises a mixture of animated scenes from the 7Fates: Chakho webtoon and live-action clips of BTS inspired by the webtoon	
"Left and Right"	2022	Charlie Puth	Drew Kirsch	Suffering from lovesickness over their exes, Puth and Jung Kook visit an elderly therapist called the Love Doctor to fix their heartache. They sing the song solo and together at the therapist's office and in a white room on a rotating platform.	
"Dreamers"	2022	Fahad Al Kubaisi	Unknown		
"Seven"	2023	Latto	Bradley & Pablo	South Korean actress Han So-hee plays the role of Jung Kook's girlfriend in the video. The two argue in a restaurant, at a laundromat that eventually floods, and out on the street during a rainstorm at night. Latto appears during a funeral service being held for Jung Kook and raps her verse atop his coffin. At the end, Jung Kook and So-hee hold hands and walk off together in the rain.	
"3D"	2023	Jack Harlow	Drew Kirsch	Jung Kook sings the song while on the phone in a telephone booth, and performs choreography with a group of dancers. Jack Harlow joins him for game of chess at a roadside cafe and raps his verses.	
"Too Much"	2023	The Kid Laroi, Central Cee	Ramez Silyan		
"Standing Next to You"	2023	None	Tanu Muino	Filmed in Budapest, Jung Kook pursues a "mysterious femme fatale" while "showcasing his dance skills through elaborate choreography" performed at various locations with a group of dancers. At the end of the video, Jung Kook and the woman stand face-to-face with each other.	

== See also ==
- BTS albums discography
- BTS singles discography
