= List of awards and nominations received by Jung Kook =

Jung Kook awards and nominations
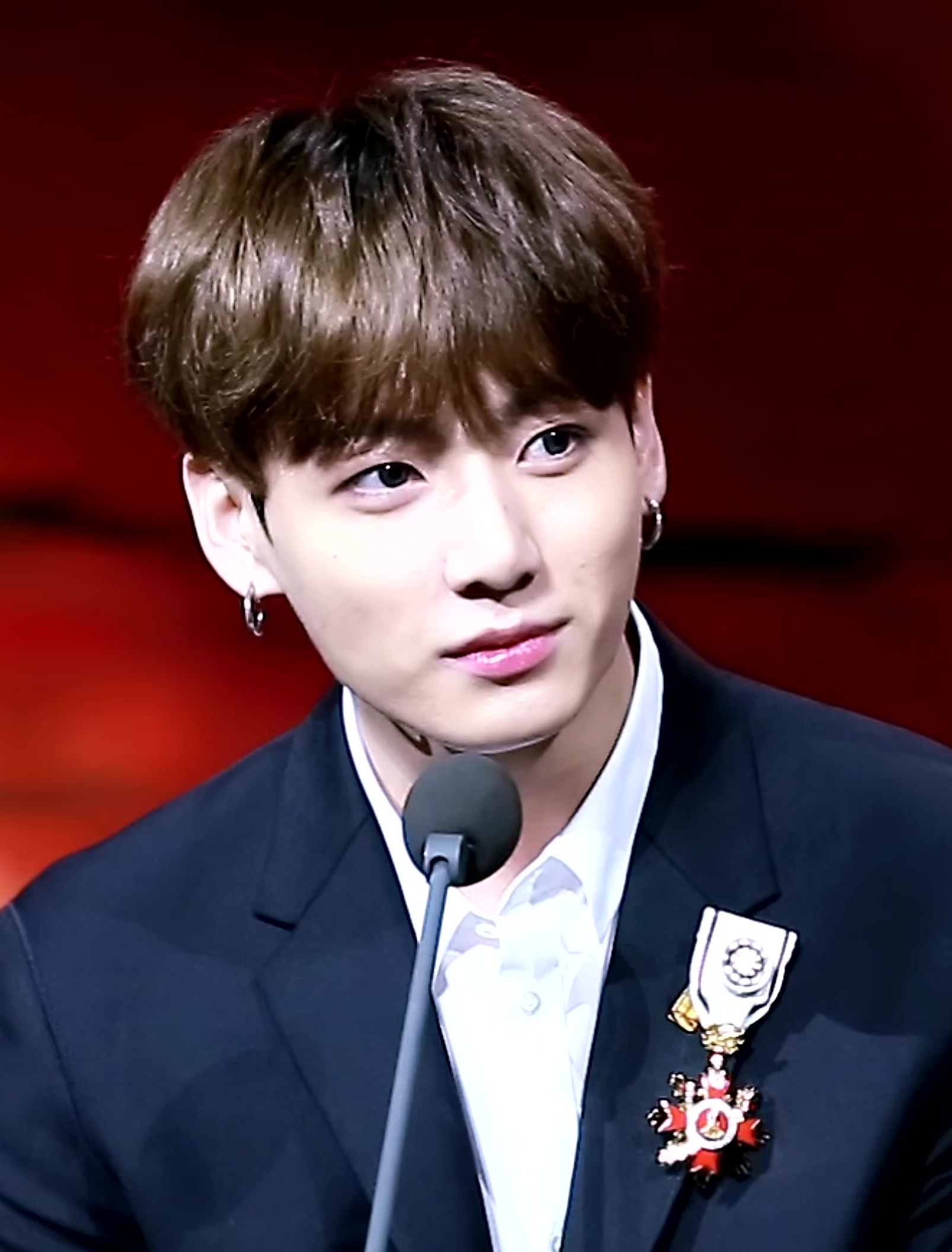
- Jung Kook accepting the Order of Cultural Merit in 2018
Awards and nominations
Award	Wins	Nominations
Asia Artist Awards	1	2
Asia Star Entertainer Awards	1	1
Asian Pop Music Awards	3	6
Billboard Music Awards	3	7
Brand Of The Year Awards	2	2
BMI Pop Awards	4	4
Circle Chart Music Awards	3	4
Clio Music Awards	1	2
The Fact Music Awards	0	2
Global Awards	1	1
Golden Disc Awards	2	2
Hanteo Music Awards	1	6
Huading Awards	1	1
iHeartRadio Music Awards	3	8
Japan Gold Disc Awards	2	2
Jupiter Music Awards	1	1
Korean Music Awards	0	4
MAMA Awards	5	13
Melon Music Awards	7	11
MTV Millennial Awards	1	1
MTV Europe Music Awards	2	4
MTV Video Music Awards	1	4
People's Choice Awards	2	6
Philippine K-pop Awards	2	2
SEC Awards	6	6
Seoul Music Awards	1	4
TikTok Awards Thailand	1	1
UK Music Video Awards	0	1

Totals (Note: Certain award groups do not simply award one winner. They acknowledge several different recipients, have runners-up, and have third place. Since this is a specific recognition and is different from losing an award, runner-up mentions are considered wins in this award tally. For simplification and to avoid errors, each award in this list has been presumed to have had a prior nomination.)
- Wins: 57
- Nominations: 108

The South Korean singer Jung Kook has received numerous industry awards and honorary accolades. His initial success came with the boy group BTS, which has won seven Korean Music Awards and been nominated for four Grammy Awards. In 2023, he made his solo debut with the studio album Golden, which helped him winning five MAMA Awards, seven Melon Music Awards, two Golden Disc Awards, and two Billboard Music Awards. Its lead single, "Seven", won one Japan Gold Disc Award, one MTV Video Music Award, two iHeartRadio Music Awards and one People's Choice Award.

== Awards and nominations ==
Name of the award ceremony, year presented, award category, nominee(s) of the award, and the result of the nomination
Award ceremony	Year	Category	Nominee(s)/work(s)	Result	Ref.
Asia Artist Awards	2024	Best K-pop Record	Jung Kook	Won	
Asia Artist Awards	2026	Popularity Award – Solo (Male)	Jung Kook	Pending	
Asia Star Entertainer Awards	2024	Song of the Year (Daesang)	"Seven" (featuring Latto)	Won	
Asian Pop Music Awards (Note: Hosted by the Hong Kong Asia Pacific International Group and Sunway Records, the Asian Pop Music Awards bases its winners on the "Asian Pop Music Chart" which opened in September 2019.)	2023	Best Male Artist (Overseas)	Jung Kook	Won	
Asian Pop Music Awards	2023	Top 20 Songs of the Year (Overseas)	"Seven" (featuring Latto)	Won	
Asian Pop Music Awards	2023	Top 20 Albums of the Year (Overseas)	Golden	Won	
Asian Pop Music Awards	2023	Album of the Year (Overseas)	Golden	Nominated	
Asian Pop Music Awards	2023	Best Collaboration (Overseas)	"Seven" (featuring Latto)	Nominated	
Asian Pop Music Awards	2023	Best Music Video (Overseas)	"Seven" (featuring Latto)	Nominated	
Billboard Music Awards	2023	Top Global K-Pop Song	"Seven" (featuring Latto)	Won	
Billboard Music Awards	2024	Top Song Sales Artist	Jung Kook	Nominated	
Billboard Music Awards	2024	Top Global K-Pop Artist	Jung Kook	Nominated	
Billboard Music Awards	2024	Top Selling Song	"Standing Next to You"	Nominated	
Billboard Music Awards	2024	Top Global K-Pop Song	"Standing Next to You"	Won	
Billboard Music Awards	2024	Top Global K-Pop Song	"3D" (featuring Jack Harlow)	Nominated	
Billboard Music Awards	2024	Top K-Pop Album	Golden	Won	
Brand of the Year Awards	2026	Best Male Solo Singer (Vietnam)	Jung Kook	Won	
Brand of the Year Awards	2026	Best Male Solo Singer(Indonesia)	Jung Kook	Won	
BMI Pop Awards	2023	Most Performed Songs of the Year	"Left and Right" (with Charlie Puth)	Won	
BMI Pop Awards	2024	Most Performed Songs of the Year	"Seven" (featuring Latto)	Won	
BMI Pop Awards	2025	Most Performed Songs of the Year	"3D" (featuring Jack Harlow)	Won	
BMI Pop Awards	2025	Most Performed Songs of the Year	"Standing Next to You"	Won	
Circle Chart Music Awards	2024	Artist of the Year – Album	Golden	Won	
Circle Chart Music Awards	2024	Artist of the Year – Digital	"Seven" (featuring Latto)	Won	
Circle Chart Music Awards	2024	Artist of the Year – Global Streaming	"Seven" (featuring Latto)	Won	
Circle Chart Music Awards	2024	Artist of the Year – Streaming Unique Listeners	"Seven" (featuring Latto)	Nominated	
Clio Music Awards	2024	Film & Video	"Seven" (featuring Latto)	Shortlisted	
Clio Music Awards	2025	Music Marketing – Direction	"Seven" (featuring Latto)	Bronze	
The Fact Music Awards	2023	Best Music (Fall)	"Seven" (featuring Latto)	Nominated	
The Fact Music Awards	2023	Idolplus Popularity Award	Jung Kook	Nominated	
Global Awards	2024	Best Fans	Jung Kook	Won	
Golden Disc Awards	2024	Best Album (Bonsang)	Golden	Won	
Golden Disc Awards	2024	Album Daesang(Album of the Year)	Golden	Nominated	
Golden Disc Awards	2024	Best Digital Song (Bonsang)	"Seven" (featuring Latto)	Won	
Golden Disc Awards	2024	Song of The Year (Daesang)	"Seven" (featuring Latto)	Nominated	
Hanteo Music Awards	2024	Artist of the Year	Jung Kook	Won	
Hanteo Music Awards	2024	Global Artist Award – Africa	Jung Kook	Nominated	
Hanteo Music Awards	2024	Global Artist Award – Asia	Jung Kook	Nominated	
Hanteo Music Awards	2024	Global Artist Award – Europe	Jung Kook	Nominated	
Hanteo Music Awards	2024	Global Artist Award – North America	Jung Kook	Nominated	
Hanteo Music Awards	2024	Global Artist Award – South America	Jung Kook	Nominated	
Huading Awards	2024	Asia's Most Popular Male Singer	Jung Kook	Won	
iHeartRadio Music Awards	2023	Best Music Video	"Left and Right" (with Charlie Puth)	Nominated	
iHeartRadio Music Awards	2024	Best Music Video	"Seven" (featuring Latto)	Won	
iHeartRadio Music Awards	2024	K-Pop Artist of the Year	Jung Kook	Won	
iHeartRadio Music Awards	2024	Best Music Video	"3D" (featuring Jack Harlow)	Nominated	
iHeartRadio Music Awards	2024	Favourite Debut Album	Golden	Nominated	
iHeartRadio Music Awards	2024	K-Pop Song of the Year	"Seven" (featuring Latto)	Nominated	
iHeartRadio Music Awards	2025	Favorite On Screen	"Are You Sure?!" (Jimin & Jung Kook)	Nominated	
iHeartRadio Music Awards	2026	Favorite On Screen	"Are You Sure?!" (Jimin & Jung Kook)	Won	
Japan Gold Disc Awards	2023	Song of the Year by Streaming – Western	"Left and Right" (with Charlie Puth)	Won	
Japan Gold Disc Awards	2024	Song of the Year by Download – Asia	"Seven" (featuring Latto)	Won	
Jupiter Music Awards	2025	Collaboration of the Year	"Too Much" (with the Kid Laroi and Central Cee)	Won	
Korean Music Awards	2024	Best K-Pop Album	Golden	Nominated	
Korean Music Awards	2024	Best K-Pop Song	"Seven" (featuring Latto)	Nominated	
Korean Music Awards	2024	Musician of the Year	Jung Kook	Nominated	
Korean Music Awards	2024	Song of the Year	"Seven" (featuring Latto)	Nominated	
MAMA Awards	2023	Best Collaboration	"Seven" (featuring Latto)	Won	
MAMA Awards	2023	Best Dance Performance Male Solo	"Seven" (featuring Latto)	Won	
MAMA Awards	2023	Song of the Year	"Seven" (featuring Latto)	Shortlisted	
MAMA Awards	2023	Artist of the Year	Jung Kook	Longlisted	
MAMA Awards	2023	Best Male Artist	Jung Kook	Nominated	
MAMA Awards	2023	Best Music Video	"Seven" (featuring Latto)	Nominated	
MAMA Awards	2024	Best Male Artist	Jung Kook	Won	
MAMA Awards	2024	Best Dance Performance Male Solo	"Standing Next to You"	Won	
MAMA Awards	2024	Fans' Choice Male Top 10	Jung Kook	Won	
MAMA Awards	2024	Artist of the Year	Jung Kook	Nominated	
MAMA Awards	2024	Album of the Year	Golden	Nominated	
MAMA Awards	2024	Fans' Choice of the Year	Jung Kook	Nominated	
MAMA Awards	2024	Song of the Year	"Standing Next to You"	Nominated	
Melon Music Awards	2023	Best Male Solo	Jung Kook	Won	
Melon Music Awards	2023	Hot Trend	Jung Kook	Won	
Melon Music Awards	2023	Millions Top 10	"Seven" (featuring Latto)	Won	
Melon Music Awards	2023	Top 10 Artist Award	Jung Kook	Won	
Melon Music Awards	2023	Artist of the Year	Jung Kook	Longlisted	
Melon Music Awards	2024	Best Male Solo	Jung Kook	Won	
Melon Music Awards	2024	Millions Top 10	Golden	Won	
Melon Music Awards	2024	Top 10 Artist Award	Jung Kook	Won	
Melon Music Awards	2024	Album of the Year	Golden	Nominated	
Melon Music Awards	2024	Artist of the Year	Jung Kook	Nominated	
Melon Music Awards	2024	Kakao Favorite Star Award	Jung Kook	Nominated	
MTV Millennial Awards	2019	Global Instagrammer	Jung Kook	Won	
MTV Europe Music Awards	2023	Best Song	"Seven" (featuring Latto)	Won	
MTV Europe Music Awards	2023	Best K-Pop	Jung Kook	Won	
MTV Europe Music Awards	2023	Biggest Fans	Jung Kook	Nominated	
MTV Europe Music Awards	2024	Best K-Pop	Jung Kook	Nominated	
MTV Video Music Awards	2022	Song of Summer	"Left and Right" (with Charlie Puth)	Nominated	
MTV Video Music Awards	2023	Song of Summer	"Seven" (featuring Latto)	Won	
MTV Video Music Awards	2024	Best Collaboration	"Seven" (featuring Latto)	Nominated	
MTV Video Music Awards	2024	Best K-Pop	"Seven" (featuring Latto)	Nominated	
People's Choice Awards	2022	The Collaboration Song of 2022	"Left and Right" (with Charlie Puth)	Won	
People's Choice Awards	2022	The Music Video of 2022	"Left and Right" (with Charlie Puth)	Nominated	
People's Choice Awards	2024	Male Artist of the Year	Jung Kook	Won	
People's Choice Awards	2024	Collaboration Song of the Year	"Seven" (featuring Latto)	Nominated	
People's Choice Awards	2024	New Artist of the Year	Jung Kook	Nominated	
People's Choice Awards	2024	Pop Artist of the Year	Jung Kook	Nominated	
Philippine K-pop Awards	2022	Male Artist of the Year	Jung Kook	Won	
Philippine K-pop Awards	2024	Male Artist of the Year	Jung Kook	Won	
SEC Awards (Note: The SEC Awards, formerly known as the Séries em Cena Awards, is a Brazilian award show that honors achievements in music, film, television, and internet culture in Brazil and globally.)	2023	International Male Artist of the Year	Jung Kook	Won	
SEC Awards	2023	International Song of the Year	"Left and Right" (with Charlie Puth)	Won	
SEC Awards	2024	International Male Artist of the Year	Jung Kook	Won	
SEC Awards	2024	International Song of the Year	"Seven" (featuring Latto)	Won	
SEC Awards	2024	International Feat of the Year	"Seven" (featuring Latto)	Won	
SEC Awards	2025	International Song of the Year	Never Let Go	Won	
Seoul Music Awards	2024	Main Award (Bonsang)	Jung Kook	Won	
Seoul Music Awards	2024	Fan Choice of the Year – April	Jung Kook	Nominated	
Seoul Music Awards	2024	Hallyu Special Award	Jung Kook	Nominated	
Seoul Music Awards	2024	Popularity Award	Jung Kook	Nominated	
TikTok Awards Thailand (Note: Held annually, the TikTok Awards Thailand celebrate and honor the most influential and outstanding musical achievements within the Thai music industry. TikTok recognizes the artists and songs that have impacted the music scene domestically and globally.)	2023	International Song of the Year	"Seven" (featuring Latto)	Won	
UK Music Video Awards	2023	Best Pop Video – International	"Seven" (featuring Latto)	Nominated	{

== Other accolades ==
=== Listicles ===
Name of publisher, year listed, name of listicle, and placement
Publisher	Year	Listicle	Placement	Ref.
Billboard	2024	K-Pop Artist 100	1st	
Billboard	2025	K-Pop Artist 100	65th	
Forbes Korea	2024	Power Celebrity 40	9th	
Forbes Korea	2025	K-Idol of the Year 30	12th	
Forbes Korea	2026	Power Celebrity 40	8th	
Gold House	2024	A100	Included	
Madame Tussauds	2025	Hot 100	Included	
Rolling Stone	2023	200 Greatest Singers of All Time	191st	

=== World records ===
Key
†	Indicates a formerly held world record (Note: This does not indicate that Jung Kook lost the record, only that the listed record holder was eventually surpassed.)

Name of publication, year the record was awarded, name of the record, and the name of the record holder
Publication	Year	World record	Record holder	Ref.
Guinness World Records	2023	† Fastest solo K-Pop artist to reach 1 billion streams on Spotify (male) (Note: 409 days)	Jung Kook	
Guinness World Records	2023	Most streamed track on Spotify in one week (male) (Note: 89,748,171 streams)	"Seven"	
Guinness World Records	2023	Fastest time for a music track to reach 100 million streams on Spotify (male) (Note: eight days)	"Seven"	
Guinness World Records	2023	Fastest time for a music track to reach 1 billion streams on Spotify (male) (Note: 109 days)	"Seven"	
Guinness World Records	2023	Most No.1 hits on The Official MENA Chart (Note: Of the 12 artists to earn number-ones on the MENA Chart, Jung Kook is the only one to do so thrice, with "Seven", "3D", and "Standing Next to You".)	Jung Kook	

== See also ==
- List of awards and nominations received by BTS
