= Are You Sure? =

Are You Sure? may refer to:

- Are You Sure? (film), a 1947 French film
- Are You Sure? (The Allisons song), 1961
- Are You Sure? (Kris Kross Amsterdam song), 2016
- Are You Sure?! (Disney+ series), 2024
- Are You Sure ?! (Disney+ series) Season 2, 2025
- "Are You Sure", song written by Ike Cargill (1943), sung by The Staple Singers on Freedom Highway
- "Are You Sure", song by So (1988)
