= Anta Eshq =

Studio album by Fahad Al Kubaisi
- Released: March 8, 2017
- Recorded: Fahad Al Kubaisi Studios (Doha), etc.
- Genres: World music, Khaliji
- Length: 50 minutes
- Label: Fahad Al Kubaisi Productions
- Producers: Fahad Al Kubaisi and Abdullah Al Manaai

Fahad Al Kubaisi chronology
Mazaji (2014)	Anta Eshq (2017)

Professional ratings
Review scores
Source	Rating
iTunes	4.5/5 stars

Anta Eshq or Enta Eshq or Enta Ishq (You Are Love) is an album by Qatari singer Fahad Al Kubaisi. The album was released on March 8, 2017 (Without CDs) on YouTube, iTunes Store and other electronic musical stores . On the 15th of the same month, in the famous Kuwaiti television program "Hamad Show", presented by the television presenter Hamad Al-Ali, known as "Hamad Qalam," Fahad talked about the details of the album and then distributed the album CDs to the audience present for the episode as a surprise to his Kuwaiti audience. Fahad recorded album songs in his studio in Doha and other studios in Bahrain, UAE, Egypt and Turkey. In Turkey, he collaborated with Turkish musicians in recording most of the album's songs as Rouh and Eshtaqt Lek.

The opening song Anta Eshq made more than 1.5 million views on YouTube after the release of the album in just three days. Fahad recorded this song in a musical form of rapping with Latin music and Khaliji music

== Track listing ==
1. "Anta Eshq " (You are love) - 4:16
2. "Eshtaqt Lek" (I missed you) - 5:52
3. "AlHadh Al Aqshar" (Bad Luck) - 3:55
4. "Allah Yekther" - 4:08
5. "Kul Al Zeyadah" - 3:25
6. "Naam Aasheq" (Yes I am a lover) - 3:54
7. "Ya Baadi" - 5:11
8. "Rouh" Eth'hab (Go) - 4:45
9. "Aheb Al Lail" (I love night) - 5:30
10. "Enqelab" (coup) - 5:09
11. "Feek Al Shabah" - 4:16

== Personnel ==
- Fahad Al Kubaisi - lead vocals
- Ismail - Buzuq
- Ilter, Erdem - Guitar
- ceyhun -Accordion
- Goksun -Soprano saxophone, Tenor saxophone
- Omar, Pop, Ibrahim Hassan, Hani Al Dosari -Percussion
- Ergun - Clarinet
- Aytac, Majed Soror -Qanun
- Islam Al Qasabji -Oud
- Ahmed khairi - Ney

=== Production ===
- Fahad Al Kubaisi - record producer, Executive producer
- Abdullah Al Manaai -record producer
- Seeroos Eisa -musical arranger
- Muhannad Saif -musical arranger
- Khalid Ezz -musical arranger
- Hesham Al Sakeran - musical arranger
