= Yes or No (Jung Kook song) =

2023 song by Jung Kook

Single by Jung Kook

from the album Golden
- Released: September 13, 2024
- Length: 2:28
- Label: Big Hit
- Songwriters: Blake Slatkin; Henry Walter; Ed Sheeran; Johnny McDaid
- Producers: Watt; Cirkut

Jung Kook singles chronology
"Never Let Go" (2024)	"Yes or No" (2024)

"Yes or No" is a song recorded by South Korean singer Jung Kook of BTS for his debut solo album Golden, which was released by Big Hit Music on November 3, 2023. The song was written by Blake Slatkin, Cirkut, Ed Sheeran, and Johnny McDaid, and produced by Cirkut and Watt. It was released as the album's fourth and final single on September 13, 2024.

== Recording and production ==
"Yes or No" was written by Blake Slatkin, Cirkut, Ed Sheeran and Johnny McDaid, with production, programming and keyboard handled by Cirkut and Slatkin; guitar by Sheeran and Slatkin; and bass by Sean Hurley and Slatkin. The song was recorded at Dogg Bounce Studio by Pdogg, who also did the vocal arrangement for the song. The mixing for "Yes or No" was performed by Serban Ghenea at MixStar Studios, Virginia Beach, Virginia, with assistance by Bryce Bordone.

== Critical reception ==
"Yes or No" received generally positive comments from music critics. Writing for The Guardian, Alexis Petridis described the track as leaning toward the R&B-influenced side, remarking that its hook-driven melody carried a "vague air" reminiscent of R. Kelly’s "Ignition". In a review for NME, Rhian Daly highlighted the song as one of the standout tracks on Golden, citing it as among the album’s strongest examples of "classic pop king anthems". Ed Power of i called the song a "whip-smart acoustic" collaboration, while Han Sung-hyun of IZM marked the song as "추천" (lit. "recommended") in his review of the album.

Other critics emphasized the influence of its co-writer, Ed Sheeran. Reviewing the album for The Standard, David Smyth wrote that the track closely reflects Sheeran’s musical style, noting that Jung Kook adopts a similarly fast-paced, rhythmic lyrical delivery. Michael Cragg from The Observer described the mid-tempo track as "objectively fine", but suggested that its similarity with Sheeran's writing reflects Jung Kook’s difficulty in establishing a distinct musical identity.

== Promotion ==
Jung Kook first performed "Yes or No" on November 9, 2023, as part of the surprise performance at TSX Times Square. It was also added to the setlist of his one-off concert "Jung Kook ‘GOLDEN’ Live on Stage" on November 20, 2023. On September 13, 2024, the song was sent to Italy radio stations as the fourth and final single from his debut studio album Golden.

== Charts ==
=== Weekly charts ===
Weekly chart performance
Chart (2023)	Peak position
Global 200 (Billboard)	23
New Zealand Hot Singles (RMNZ)	5
South Korea (Circle)	62
Vietnam Hot 100 (Billboard)	32

=== Monthly charts ===
Monthly chart performance
Chart (2023)	Position
South Korea (Circle)	66

== Release history ==
Release dates and formats
Region	Date	Format	Label(s)	Ref.
Italy	September 13, 2024	Radio airplay	EMI	
