= Jung Kook =

South Korean singer (born 1997)

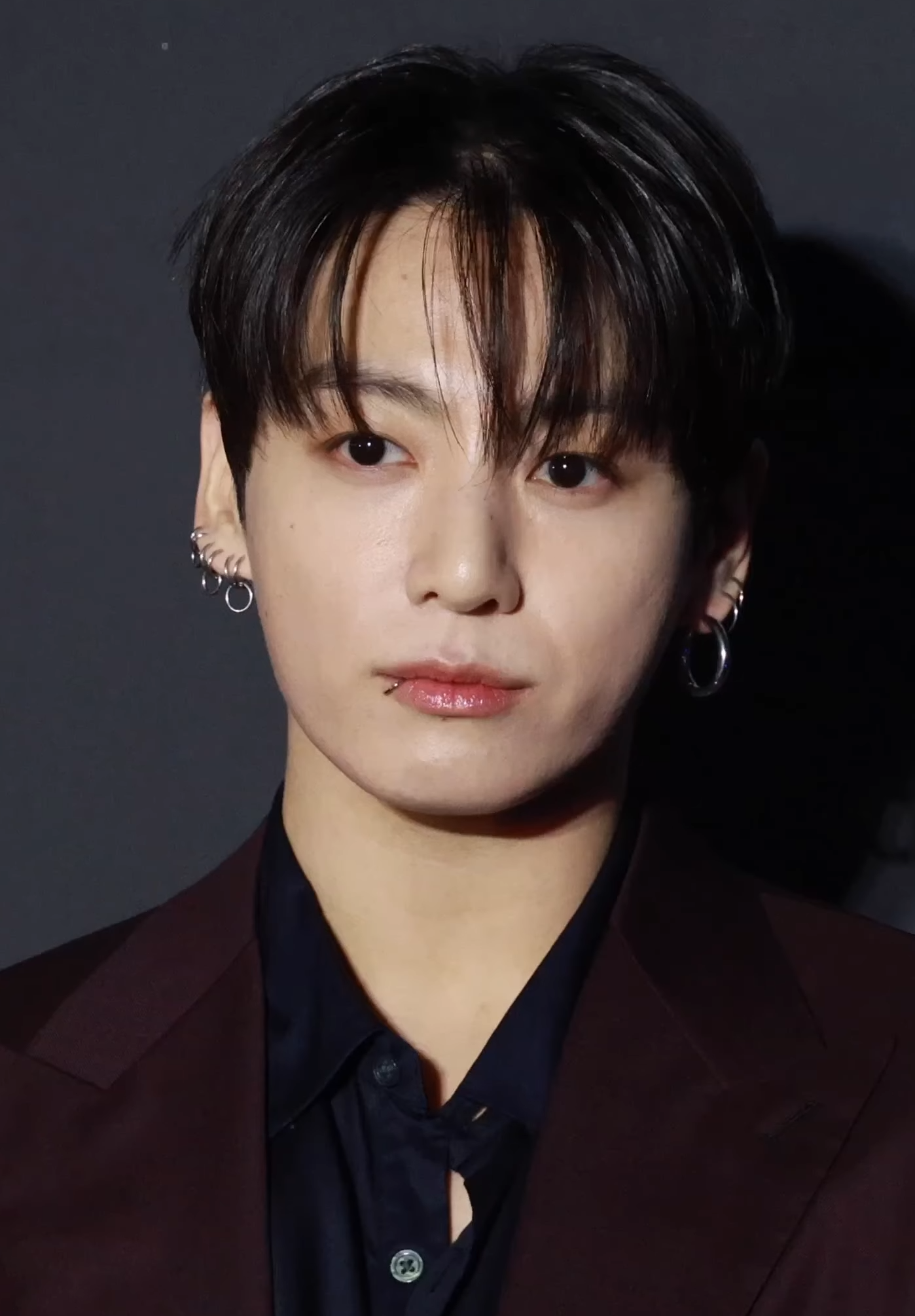
- Jung Kook in February 2026
- Born: Jeon Jung-kook; September 1, 1997 (age 29); Busan, South Korea
- Education: Global Cyber University
- Occupations: Singer; songwriter
- Works: Discography
- Awards: Full list
- Honours: Hwagwan Order of Cultural Merit (2018)
- Musical career
- Genres: K-pop; EDM
- Instrument: Vocals
- Years active: 2013–present
- Label: Big Hit
- Member of: BTS

Korean name
- Hangul: 전정국
- Hanja: 田柾國
- RR: Jeon Jeongguk
- MR: Chŏn Chŏngguk

Jeon Jung-kook (Korean: 전정국; born September 1, 1997), known professionally as Jung Kook, is a South Korean singer and songwriter. He rose to prominence as a member of South Korean boy band BTS. He has performed three solo songs as part of BTS' discography—"Begin" in 2016, "Euphoria" in 2018, and "My Time" in 2020—all of which charted on South Korea's Gaon Digital Chart. He also recorded the soundtrack song "Stay Alive" for the BTS-based webtoon 7Fates: Chakho.

In 2022, Jung Kook featured on American singer Charlie Puth's single "Left and Right", which peaked at number 22 on the US Billboard Hot 100. Later that year, he became the first South Korean artist to release an official song for the FIFA World Cup soundtrack with "Dreamers", which he subsequently performed at the 2022 FIFA World Cup opening ceremony. In 2023, Jung Kook released his debut solo single "Seven" featuring Latto, which broke numerous chart and streaming records. It debuted at number one on the Billboard Hot 100, the Global 200, and the Global Excl. U.S. charts, making him the first Korean solo artist to do so, and eventually became the fastest song in history to surpass 1 billion streams on Spotify. His follow-up single "3D", featuring Jack Harlow, debuted at number five on both the Hot 100 and the UK Singles Chart, making Jung Kook the first South Korean solo artist to achieve two consecutive top-five entries on the latter.

== Early life and education ==
Jeon Jung-kook was born on September 1, 1997, in Busan, South Korea. His family consists of his parents and an elder brother. He attended Baekyang Elementary and Middle School in Busan. When he became an idol trainee, he transferred to Singu Middle School in Seoul.

In 2011, Jung Kook auditioned for the South Korean talent show Superstar K during its auditions in Daegu. Though he was not selected, he received casting offers from seven entertainment companies. He eventually chose to become a trainee under Big Hit Entertainment after seeing RM, now his fellow band member and leader in BTS. To work on his dance skills in preparation for his debut, he went to Los Angeles during the summer of 2012 to receive dance training from Movement Lifestyle. In June 2012, he appeared in Jo Kwon's "I'm Da One" music video and was a backup dancer for Glam before his debut.

He graduated from the School of Performing Arts Seoul, an arts high school, in 2017. In November 2016, he decided to forgo taking the CSATs, Korea's nationwide university entrance exam. In March 2022, he received his degree from Global Cyber University's Department of Broadcasting and Entertainment. He received the President's Award, the school's highest honor.

== Career ==
=== 2013–present: BTS ===
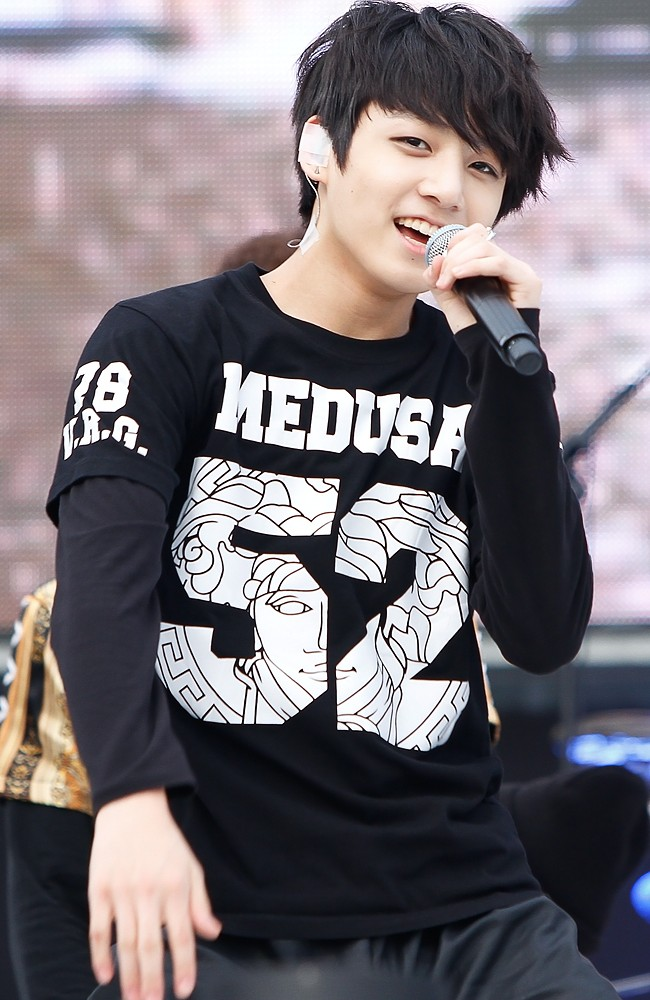
Jung Kook performing in July 2013

On June 12, 2013, Jung Kook made his debut as a member of BTS with the release of the single 2 Cool 4 Skool. Under BTS, he has sung three solo songs. The first, a pop track titled "Begin", from the 2016 album Wings, tells his story of moving to Seoul at a young age to become an idol and expresses his gratitude towards his bandmates for taking care of him during that time. The second, a future bass song titled "Euphoria", was released with an accompanying nine-minute short film on April 5, 2018, as the introduction to the third part of BTS' "Love Yourself" series. Produced by DJ Swivel, the song charted at number five on the Billboard Bubbling Under Hot 100. Its full studio version was included on BTS' Love Yourself: Answer compilation album, released on August 24. The third solo, "My Time", off the band's 2020 studio album Map of the Soul: 7, is an R&B song about forgoing teenage experiences because of his career and charted at number 84 on the US Billboard Hot 100. "Euphoria" and "My Time" are the first and second longest-charting solo tracks among K-pop singers on the Billboard World Digital Song Sales chart, having spent a record 90 and 85 weeks respectively on the ranking.

Aside from singing, Jung Kook has also helped produce two songs for BTS: "Love is Not Over", from the band's 2015 extended play (EP) The Most Beautiful Moment in Life, Pt. 1, and "Magic Shop", from the band's 2018 album Love Yourself: Tear—he is credited as the main producer for both tracks.

In October 2018, Jung Kook, together with his bandmates, was awarded the fifth-class Hwagwan Order of Cultural Merit by the President of South Korea, Moon Jae-in. He was appointed Special Presidential Envoy for Future Generations and Culture, again alongside his bandmates, by Moon in July 2021, to help "lead the global agenda for future generations" and "expand South Korea's diplomatic efforts and global standing" in the international community.

=== 2015–present: Solo activities ===
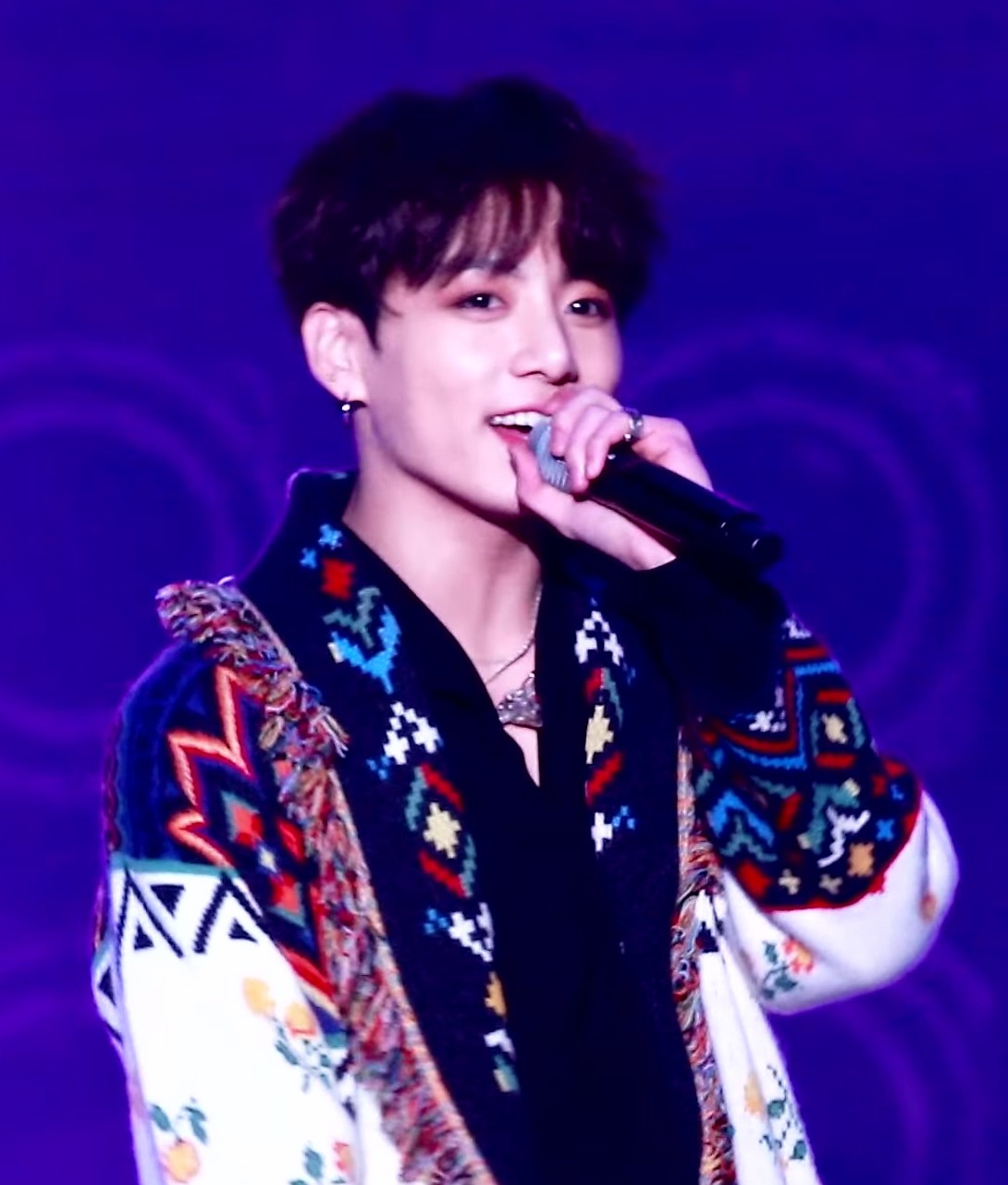
Jung Kook performing "Boy In Luv" at the 2018 SBS Gayo Daejeon

In September 2015, Jung Kook participated in the "One Dream, One Korea" campaign, taking part in a song collaboration alongside various Korean artists in memory of the Korean War. The song was released on September 24 and presented at the One K Concert in Seoul on October 15. The following year, Jung Kook was cast in the pilot episode of Flower Crew. He also appeared on Celebrity Bromance, and competed on King of Mask Singer under the name "Fencing Man", appearing in episode 72. On November 6, 2018, Jung Kook collaborated with American singer Charlie Puth for a special duet performance of the latter's "We Don't Talk Anymore" single at the MBC Plus X Genie Music Awards. He released the self-produced song "Still With You" for free on SoundCloud on June 4, 2020, as part of BTS' annual debut anniversary celebrations.

In February 2022, Jung Kook sang the soundtrack for 7Fates: Chakho, a new BTS-based webtoon. Titled "Stay Alive" and produced by bandmate Suga, the song earned Jung Kook his first solo entry on the Hot 100 with its debut at number 95, and his first solo top-ten entry on the Billboard Global Excl. U.S chart at number eight; it also became the first Korean soundtrack in history to debut on the UK Singles Chart, at number 89. He released another self-produced song, "My You", for free on June 12 as part of BTS' ninth anniversary celebrations, and appeared as a featured artist on the single "Left and Right" by Puth later that month. On November 20, Jung Kook released the single "Dreamers" ahead of his performance at the opening ceremony for the 2022 FIFA World Cup in Qatar later that same day; the single was included on the tournament's official soundtrack album. He headlined the event at Al Bayt Stadium, performing the song with Qatari singer Fahad Al Kubaisi; he is the first Korean artist to sing an official theme for the World Cup and perform at an opening ceremony for the event.

"Still With You" and "My You" were made available on streaming services worldwide as official singles under Jung Kook's name on July 3. His debut solo single "Seven", featuring American rapper Latto, was released on July 14. It debuted at number one on the Hot 100, the Global 200, and the Global Excl. US charts, making him the first Korean solo artist to simultaneously top all three charts and the second—after Jimin—to debut atop the Hot 100; the song eventually became the fastest in history to surpass 1 billion streams on Spotify. Jung Kook performed as a headliner at the Global Citizen Festival in Central Park, New York City on September 23. His second solo single, "3D", featuring Jack Harlow, was released on September 29. It debuted at number five on both the Hot 100 and the UK Singles Chart, making Jung Kook the first Korean solo artist to earn two top-five singles on the latter. That same month, The Hollywood Reporter named Jung Kook in its inaugural "Platinum Players of Music" list, as one of the top 25 musicians that "defined the year in music." The collaboration single "Too Much", with the Kid Laroi and Central Cee, followed in October. "Too Much" debuted at number 10 in the UK, making Jung Kook the first Korean solo artist to achieve three top-10 singles in UK chart history. His debut solo album Golden and a third single, "Standing Next to You", were released on November 3. Golden set new all-time opening day and opening week sales records, with over 2.1 and 2.4 million copies respectively, and became the first album by a South Korean solo artist to surpass 2.5 million sales. In the US, it debuted at number two on the Billboard 200, making Jung Kook one of the highest-charting South Korean solo artists in Billboard chart history, and the first to sell over 200,000 copies within a week.

Big Hit released the single "Never Let Go" by Jung Kook on June 7, 2024, as part of BTS' 11th anniversary celebrations; it is his first project to be released post-enlistment. The Disney+-exclusive eight-episode travel reality series Are You Sure?!, featuring Jung Kook and Jimin, premiered on August 8, 2024 with subsequent episodes released weekly through September 19, 2024 and the second season released on December 3, 2025. A film documentary titled I Am Still, chronicling Jung Kook's foray as a solo artist with Golden, premiered in 120 territories worldwide on September 18.

== Artistry ==
Rolling Stone's Brian Hiatt describes Jung Kook as "an extraordinarily soulful tenor". Kim Min-sook, writing for the Korean music website Reputation, described his voice as "soft" and suitable to sentimental songs, also praising his ability to keep a stable intonation even while dancing, while Mary Siroky of Consequence observed that he "has the kind of clear, dexterous voice built for pop music". Music critic Kim Young-dae considers Jung Kook's vocal performance to be the strong point of BTS songs such as "Danger", "Butterfly", "Autumn Leaves", and "Lost", as well as his solo song "Euphoria", commenting that his voice is "especially notable, for both the techniques and his detailed, expressive capacity that attributes a lot [of] narrative to ordinary notes". In 2023, Rolling Stone ranked Jung Kook as 191st on their list of the 200 Greatest Singers of All Time, calling him "an extremely gifted singer" who "hits high notes with ease and harmonizes with his BTS members effortlessly, always giving his audience new ad-libs and unexpected vocal riffs to keep things interesting".

In January 2024, Jung Kook was promoted to a full member of the Korea Music Copyright Association.

=== Influences ===
Jung Kook has cited Justin Bieber, Justin Timberlake, and Usher as some of his musical inspirations.

== Impact and influence ==
In a 2019 survey conducted by Gallup Korea, Jung Kook ranked as the third most-loved celebrity of the year in South Korea. He debuted on the list in 2016 at 20th, placing 17th in 2017 and eighth in 2018. Jung Kook placed first for 10 consecutive weeks on magazine Hi China's list of the most beloved celebrities in China in 2018. Various artists have cited him as an influence and role model, such as Kim Dong-han and Hyeongseop X Euiwoong.

Jung Kook was the most-searched male K-pop idol on Google in the first half of 2019, topping the chart again in the following year, and the most searched K-pop idol on YouTube in 2019 and 2020. On Tumblr, he ranked first on the "Top K-Pop Stars" list for three consecutive years. On Twitter, his tweets were the most retweeted of 2018 in South Korea and 2019 globally, and second-most retweeted of 2020 globally. Jung Kook also set all-time records for the most real-time livestream viewers in V Live history twice, the first time in October 2018 with 3.7 million viewers and again in March 2021 with 22 million viewers.

Jung Kook earned the nickname "Sold Out King" from media outlets, as items that he is seen using often sell out quickly. These include shoes, Downy fabric softener, wine, novels (namely I Decided to Live as Me by Kim Soo-hyun, which became a best-seller in both Korea and Japan), and Hanbok. Korean media credited Jung Kook with the creation of the "Modern Hanbok" fashion trend in the Korean entertainment industry when celebrities such as Jun Hyun-moo, Jang Do-yeon, Gong Hyo-jin, MC Oh Seung-hwan and The Return of Superman's Park Joo-ho began wearing similar clothing after he was photographed wearing it.

In June 2021, a lawmaker of the Justice Party used photos of Jung Kook to promote the legalization of tattoos in South Korea. The posts were widely condemned by netizens, who accused the lawmaker of taking advantage of Jung Kook's fame for political purposes. That same year, images of Jung Kook were posted by Mayor John Geesnell Yap of Tagbilaran, Philippines, to convince citizens to receive the COVID-19 vaccine.

In 2024, Jung Kook ranked 9th on Forbes Korea Power Celebrity 40. He also made it to the Gold House A100 list, recognizing him as one of the "100 Asian Pacific leaders" with the most significant impact on American culture and society. He was named the biggest K-Pop musician in America as he ranked first on the inaugural Billboard K-Pop Artist 100 list. In 2025, Jung Kook made it to the Madame Tussauds Hot 100 list, recognizing him as a global superstar.

== Other ventures ==
=== Ambassadorships ===
Jung Kook was announced as the newest global ambassador for Calvin Klein in March 2023.

At the end of 2025, he was announced as the global ambassador for French luxury brand Chanel Fragrance & Beauty.

In February 2026, Swiss luxury watchmaker Hublot appointed Jung Kook as its global ambassador.

In July 2026, he was announced as the global ambassador for Graff, a British luxury jeweller.

=== Philanthropy ===
Jung Kook donated ₩1 billion (US$746,114.98) to Seoul National University Children's Hospital in April 2023, for treatment expenses of patients from low-income families and the hospital's integrated care center.

Jung Kook donated ₩1 billion (US$746,114.98) through the Hope Bridge Korea Disaster Relief Association in March 2025, with ₩500 million (US$373,057.49) for emergency aid and relief supplies of wildfire victims while the remaining ₩500 million (US$373,057.49) for initiatives aimed at raising awareness and improving the working conditions of firefighters. This donation was the largest ever made by a celebrity in the history of disaster relief in South Korea, reason why he became the inaugural member of the Hope Bridge Honors Legacy, a list that honors the most generous donors.

== Personal life ==
Since 2018, Jung Kook has lived in Hannam-dong, Seoul, South Korea with his bandmates. In July 2019, he purchased an apartment in Yongsan District, Seoul worth ₩4 billion, which he gifted to his older brother in December 2020. As of July 2021, Jung Kook's net worth was estimated to be US$20 million.

Jung Kook's father is Christian and his mother is Buddhist, but he has stated that he has no particular religious affiliation.

=== Health ===
In 2017, Jung Kook collapsed during a BTS concert in Chile. During the band's Love Yourself World Tour in 2018, he suffered a heel injury which prevented him from participating in choreography. He did not withdraw from the subsequent European leg of the tour, but sang while seated.

In November 2019, Jung Kook was involved in a car accident with a taxi. Neither party suffered any major injuries, and both reached an amicable settlement.

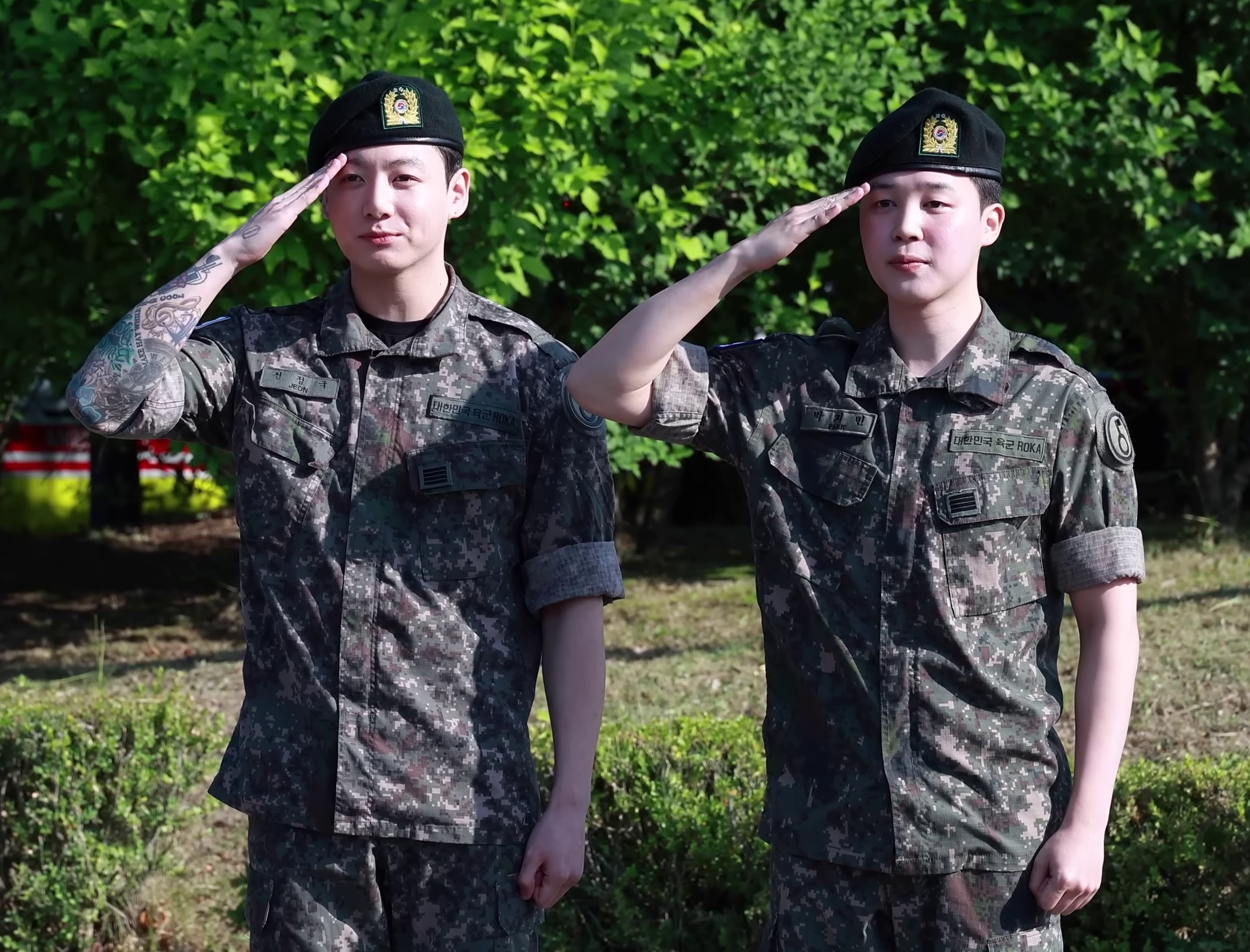
Jung Kook and Jimin parading on the day of their military discharge

=== Military service ===
On November 22, 2023, Big Hit announced through Weverse that Jung Kook, along with bandmates RM, Jimin, and V, had started the enlistment process to carry out his mandatory military service. Jung Kook confirmed in a subsequent post that he would enlist in December. He began his military service on December 12, 2023 with fellow member Jimin using the buddy system. They both were discharged on June 11, 2025.

== Discography ==
- Golden (2023)

== Filmography ==
=== Films ===
Year	Title	Role	Notes	Ref.
2024	Jung Kook: I Am Still	Himself	Documentary film	

=== Television ===
Year	Title	Role	Note(s)	Ref.
2016	Music Bank	Himself	Special host with Sana	
2016	Show! Music Core	Himself	Special host with Jimin	
2016	Show! Music Core	Himself	Special host with J-Hope	
2016	Flower Crew	Cast member	Pilot episode	
2016	Celebrity Bromance	Cast member	Season 8, episodes 35–39	
2017	Show Champion	Himself	Special host	
2024–2025	Are You Sure?!	Himself		

- Jung Kook also appeared in the short film titled BTS Wings Short Film #1 Begin, released in September 2016 in promotion of BTS' fourth studio album Wings.

=== Directing ===
Year	Title	Director(s)	Ref.
2017	"G.C.F in Tokyo (정국&지민)"	JK	
2018	"G.C.F in Osaka"	JK	
2018	"G.C.F in USA"	JK	
2018	"G.C.F in Saipan"	JK	
2018	"G.C.F in Newark VHS ver."	JK	
2019	"G.C.F in Helsinki"	JK	
2020	"Life Goes On"	Jung Kook, Choi Yongseok & Yoon Jihye (Lumpens)	
2020	"Life Goes On: on my pillow"	Jung Kook, Choi Yongseok & Yoon Jihye (Lumpens)	
2020	"Life Goes On: in the forest"	Jung Kook, Choi Yongseok & Yoon Jihye (Lumpens)	
2020	"Life Goes On: like an arrow"	Jung Kook, Nu Kim, Choi Yongseok & Yoon Jihye (Lumpens)	
2023	"G.C.F in Budapest"	JK	

== Bibliography ==
- Kim, Young-dae (2019a). BTS–The Review: A Comprehensive Look at the Music of BTS. Translated by H.J. Chung. RH Korea. ISBN 978-8-925-56582-8.
