= Seven (Jung Kook song) =

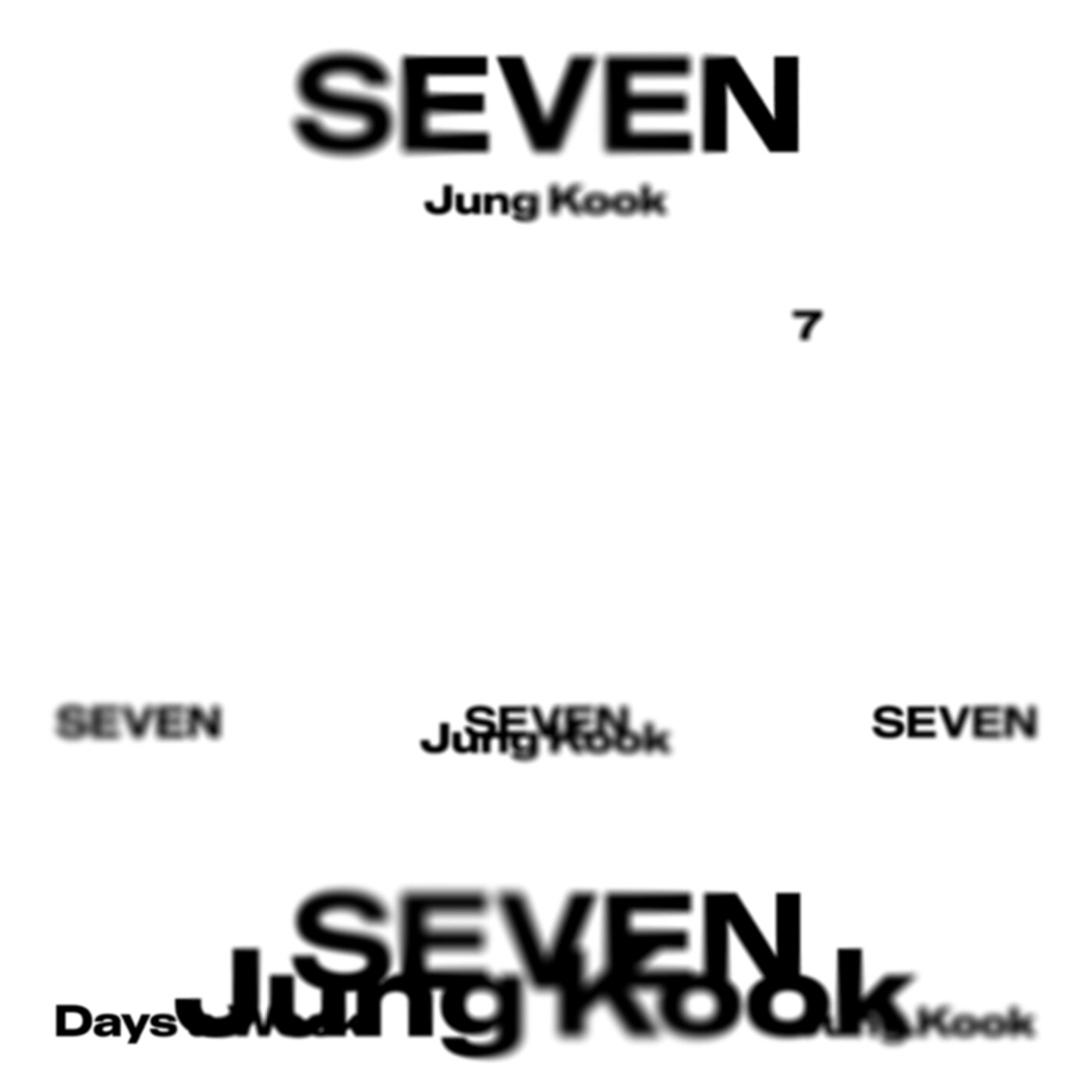
- Original and clean version cover (Note: The explicit version cover is the same but with a black background and red text instead while the instrumental version features a gray background with black text. The various remix covers feature multi-colored variations of the same design.)

Single by Jung Kook featuring Latto

from the album Golden
- Released: July 14, 2023
- Genre: UK garage; pop
- Length: 3:05
- Label: Big Hit
- Songwriters: Andrew Watt; Cirkut; Jon Bellion; Latto; Theron Makiel Thomas
- Producers: Watt; Cirkut

Jung Kook singles chronology
| "Dreamers" (2022) | "Seven" (2023) | "3D" (2023) |

Latto singles chronology
| "Put It on da Floor Again" (2023) | "Seven" (2023) | "Too Fast (Pull Over)" (2023) |

Music video
- "Seven" on YouTube

"Seven" is a song by South Korean singer Jung Kook of BTS featuring American rapper Latto, released as a single on July 14, 2023, through Big Hit Music. It was produced by Andrew Watt and Cirkut who co-wrote it with Jon Bellion, Latto, and Theron Makiel Thomas. The song is a romantic UK garage pop track about wanting to spend all of one's time with one's lover. An explicit version was also released, and later included on Jungkook's debut studio album Golden.

The single entered music charts in over fifty territories and topped rankings in India, Latvia, Malaysia, and Singapore. It debuted atop the Billboard Hot 100 in the United States and the Global 200, becoming both Jungkook and Latto's first number-one. It also topped Billboard's Hits of the World charts in Hong Kong, Indonesia, Malaysia, Vietnam, South Korea, Philippines, and Taiwan.

"Seven" debuted at number three on the UK Singles Chart and set a new record as the highest debuting single by a solo Korean act in history. Elsewhere, it charted in the top ten in Australia, Canada, Ireland, Japan, Lithuania, Peru, Paraguay, New Zealand, South Korea, and Switzerland. It also broke the record for the fastest song in history to surpass one billion streams on Spotify and eventually became the most-streamed collaboration of 2023 on the platform.

== Background and release ==
Upon hearing “Seven,” I thought, “This is it.” After that, I focused on practicing and recording the track multiple times to perfect it. I hope that many people can feel as I felt when I first heard the song.

— Jung Kook talks about 'Seven', Variety

On June 29, 2023, Big Hit Music announced via Weverse that Jungkook's single "Seven" would be released on July 14, 2023. Prior to the digital single's release, "Still with You" and "My You" were made available on streaming services such as Spotify and Apple Music on July 3, 2023. Both songs were previously only available on SoundCloud or YouTube. On July 7, concept photos and a short film were released. This was followed by the official music video teaser on July 13.

A progressive house dance remix by Swedish DJ Alesso was released on August 25, 2023, while a second remix, by French DJ David Guetta, was released at the end of October.

== Lyrics and composition ==
Described as an "invigorating summer song", "Seven" was produced by Andrew Watt and Cirkut, both of whom co-wrote it with Jon Bellion, Latto, and Theron Makiel Thomas. The song is in 4/4 common time in the key of B major with a tempo of 126 beats per minute and a vocal range that spans from F♯_{4} to D♯_{6}_{.} Musically, it is a pop song of the UK garage genre with acoustic guitar sounds and a catchy melody. Lyrically, "Seven" is a romantic serenade about wanting to spend every moment of every day with one's lover. The explicit version's lyrics express a more sexual desire.

== Reception ==
Writing for NME, Rhian Daly gave "Seven" a four star rating out of five, praising Jungkook's "polished mid-register and honeyed falsetto" and opining that the song "set the bar high for his solo era".

Year-end lists for "Seven"
| Publication | List | Rank | Ref. |
|---|---|---|---|
| Billboard | The 100 Best Songs of 2023 | 55 | |
| Complex | The 15 Best K-Pop and Rap Collaborations of All Time | 1 | |
| Consequence | The 200 Best Songs of 2023 | 117 | |
| Rolling Stone | The 100 Best Songs of 2023 | 99 | |
| Uproxx | The Best Songs Of 2023 | Placed | |

== Commercial performance ==
"Seven" debuted atop the daily Global Spotify Chart with almost 16 million streams, recording the most opening-day streams for a male artist and collaboration in history and the biggest debut in 2023. Jungkook became the first K-pop act to reach number one the U.S. Spotify chart and the first Korean solo artist to debut atop the global chart.

In Japan, with only three days of availability, "Seven" debuted at number two on the Billboard Japan Hot 100 chart issue dated July 19, 2023, for the period July 10–16. It was the most downloaded song of its release week, debuting at number one on the component Download Songs chart with 39,170 copies sold, more than double the sales of the number two song "Idol" by Yoasobi (18,434 downloads). It also entered the component Streaming Songs chart at number 14 with 4,608,696 streams. The single spent a second consecutive week at number two on the Hot 100 (chart dated July 26), and sold a further 12,656 units, as the fourth most downloaded song for the period dated July 17–23. It peaked at number two on the Streaming chart with 14,601,063 streams, three times more than its opening week total.

The single debuted at number three on the UK Singles Chart, earning the highest debut for a solo Korean act in the history of the chart. Jungkook surpassed the record previously set by bandmate Jimin, who peaked at number eight with "Like Crazy" a few months earlier. He also tied with BTS for the highest Singles Chart debut and peak of all time; the band previously debuted at number three with "Dynamite" in 2020, and "Butter" and "My Universe" in 2021.

=== United States ===
According to Luminate, "Seven" received 5.11 million on-demand streams and sold over 34,000 digital copies on its opening day (July 14, 2023) in the United States. It continued to earn over 2.5 million streams daily over the next three days, accruing 13.7 million streams in its first four days of availability, and sold a further 32,000 digital copies within that time. The single debuted at number one on the Billboard Hot 100 issue dated July 29—the 68th number one debut in Billboard chart history—with 21.9 million streams, 6.4 million in airplay audience, and 153,000 combined digital (Note: original and instrumental versions released July 14; "Summer" and "Band" mixes released July 17) and CD singles sold from July 14 through July 20. It was the second best-selling digital song and fourth most-streamed song of its release week, additionally debuting at numbers 30 and 33 on the Adult Pop Airplay and Pop Airplay charts, respectively. "Seven" is Jungkook's first number one and top-10 entry on the Hot 100. He is the second member of BTS to achieve a number one after Jimin previously did so with "Like Crazy" in April. The single also became Latto's first number one on the chart; she previously peaked at number three with "Big Energy" in April 2022. Watt and Cirkut earned their tenth and second Hot 100 number one respectively as producers; ninth and fourth number one respectively as writers; while for Bellion and Thomas it was their second number one as writers and Latto's first. Jungkook and Latto also achieved new peaks on the Artist 100, at numbers five and eleven respectively. "Seven" ended the year as the seventh best-selling digital single of 2023 overall in the US, with 228,000 copies sold.

=== Worldwide ===
"Seven" debuted atop the July 29 issue of the Billboard Global 200, with 269,000 downloads sold and 217.1 million streams accrued worldwide from July 14 through July 20, 2023, just surpassing Miley Cyrus' "Flowers" (the week of February 4, 2023) for the biggest week for a song by a solo artist since the chart's inception. It also earned the second biggest overall streaming week of all time, behind only "Butter" by BTS which earned 289.2 million streams for the week dated June 5, 2021. Jungkook became the first member of BTS to top the global chart as a solo artist while Latto also achieved her first number one on the ranking; she previously peaked at number 32 with "Big Energy" in April 2022. Both artists concurrently debuted atop the Global Excl. US chart, with 195.8 million streams and 131,000 downloads sold in territories outside of the U.S. for the same period, earning their first number one and highest peaks on the ranking; Jungkook previously peaked at number two with "Left and Right" in July 2022, while Latto peaked at number 117 with "Big Energy" in May 2022. In its second consecutive week atop both Global charts (August 5 issue), "Seven" earned 152.1 and 138.1 million cumulative streams respectively, for the period dated July 21–29. It spent a third consecutive week at number one on both charts (August 12 issue), with an additional 14,000 sales and 124.3 million streams earned globally, and 5,000 sales and 112.8 million streams accrued outside of the US, for the period dated July 28 to August 3. "Seven" is the second song of 2023, after "Flowers", to debut at number one on both Global charts and spend its first four weeks (as of the August 19 issue date) atop both rankings—"Flowers" spent its first six weeks at number one. The song sold 4,000 copies in its fourth week (period dated August 4–10) and earned 111.7 million streams worldwide. It became the first song, since the Excl. US chart's inception, to achieve four consecutive weeks of over 100 million streams in territories outside of the US, earning 101.9 million streams and a further 3,000 sales for the same period.

The song remained at number one on both Global charts (issues dated August 26, 2023) in its fifth week, with 104.3 million streams and 4,000 sales earned worldwide, and 95.1 million streams and 3,000 sales in territories outside of the US, during the period dated August 11–17, becoming the second song of 2023, after "Flowers", to spend its first five weeks atop both charts. In its sixth week, "Seven" tied with "Flowers" as the only songs of the year to lead the Global rankings (September 2 issue) in their first six weeks. It accumulated 94.1 million streams and sold 2,000 copies worldwide during the period dated August 18–24, and earned 85.8 million streams and 2,000 sales outside of the US. "Seven" surpassed "Flowers"' record the following week, becoming the first song of 2023 to top both Global charts (issues dated September 9) in its first seven weeks. It earned a further 97 million streams and 12,000 sales worldwide, and 88.2 million streams and 8,000 sales outside of the US, for the period dated August 25–31. It spent an eighth consecutive week atop the Excl. US chart (September 16 issue) with 83.8 million streams and 3,000 sales for the period dated September 1–7, but was succeeded by Doja Cat's "Paint the Town Red" on the Global 200, charting at number two instead. Altogether, "Seven" spent nine consecutive weeks at number one on the Excl. US chart, as of the issue dated September 16, with 77.7 million streams and 2,000 sales during the period dated September 8–14, while remaining at number two on the Global 200.

In February 2024, the International Federation of the Phonographic Industry (IFPI) published its annual top-10 charts for the previous year and listed "Seven" as the 10th best-selling digital single of 2023 globally, having amassed 1.24 billion subscription stream equivalents worldwide in less than six months.

== Accolades ==
Globally, "Seven" set two Guinness World Records: for the Most streamed track on Spotify in one week (male) (Note: 89,748,171 streams) and Fastest time for a music track to reach 100 million streams on Spotify (male). (Note: eight days) By the end of October, it broke two additional records: Fastest time for a music track to reach 1 billion streams on Spotify (male)—previously held jointly by the Kid Laroi and Justin Bieber's "Stay" and Harry Styles' "As It Was" (118 days)—and overall—previously held by Cyrus' "Flowers" (112 days)—doing so in 109 days. Domestically, the song won four consecutive Melon Popularity awards from July 24 to August 14, 2023, and achieved triple crowns on M Countdown, Inkigayo, and Music Core, winning 13 first-place trophies altogether on domestic television music shows.

Per Billboard, "Seven" ranked as the number one Global Song of the Summer (Note: Billboard compiles a list of the top 10 best-performing songs globally) from Memorial Day through Labor Day, based on sales and streaming activity compiled by Luminate for the Global 200 (chart issues dated June 10 through September 9).

Awards & Nominations for "Seven"
| Award ceremony | Year | Category | Result | Ref. |
|---|---|---|---|---|
| Asia Star Entertainer Awards | 2024 | Song of the Year (Daesang) | Won | |
| Asian Pop Music Awards (Note: Hosted by the Hong Kong Asia Pacific International Group and Sunway Records, the Asian Pop Music Awards bases its winners on the "Asian Pop Music Chart" which opened in September 2019.) | 2023 | Top 20 Songs of the Year (Overseas) | Won | |
| Asian Pop Music Awards | 2023 | Best Collaboration (Overseas) | Nominated | |
| Asian Pop Music Awards | 2023 | Best Music Video (Overseas) | Nominated | |
| Billboard Music Awards | 2023 | Top Global K-Pop Song | Won | |
| BMI Pop Awards | 2024 | Most Performed Songs of the Year | Won | |
| Circle Chart Music Awards | 2024 | Artist of the Year – Digital | Won | |
| Circle Chart Music Awards | 2024 | Artist of the Year – Global Streaming | Won | |
| Circle Chart Music Awards | 2024 | Artist of the Year – Streaming Unique Listeners | Nominated | |
| Clio Music Awards | 2024 | Film & Video | Shortlisted | |
| The Fact Music Awards | 2023 | Best Music (Fall) | Nominated | |
| Golden Disc Awards | 2024 | Best Digital Song (Bonsang) | Won | |
| Golden Disc Awards | 2024 | Song of The Year (Daesang) | Nominated | |
| iHeartRadio Music Awards | 2024 | Best Music Video | Won | |
| iHeartRadio Music Awards | 2024 | K-Pop Song of the Year | Nominated | |
| Japan Gold Disc Awards | 2024 | Song of the Year by Download – Asia | Won | |
| Korean Music Awards | 2024 | Best K-Pop Song | Nominated | |
| Korean Music Awards | 2024 | Song of the Year | Nominated | |
| MAMA Awards | 2023 | Best Collaboration | Won | |
| MAMA Awards | 2023 | Best Dance Performance Male Solo | Won | |
| MAMA Awards | 2023 | Song of the Year | Shortlisted | |
| MAMA Awards | 2023 | Best Music Video | Nominated | |
| Melon Music Awards | 2023 | Millions Top 10 | Won | |
| MTV Europe Music Awards | 2023 | Best Song | Won | |
| MTV Video Music Awards | 2023 | Song of Summer | Won | |
| MTV Video Music Awards | 2024 | Best Collaboration | Nominated | |
| MTV Video Music Awards | 2024 | Best K-Pop | Nominated | |
| People's Choice Awards | 2024 | Collaboration Song of the Year | Nominated | |
| SEC Awards (Note: The SEC Awards, formerly known as the Séries em Cena Awards, is a Brazilian award show that honors achievements in music, film, television, and internet culture in Brazil and globally.) | 2024 | International Song of the Year | Won | |
| SEC Awards | 2024 | International Feat of the Year | Won | |
| TikTok Awards Thailand (Note: Held annually, the TikTok Awards Thailand celebrate and honor the most influential and outstanding musical achievements within the Thai music industry. TikTok recognizes the artists and songs that have impacted the music scene domestically and globally.) | 2023 | International Song of the Year | Won | |
| UK Music Video Awards | 2023 | Best Pop Video – International | Nominated | |

Music program awards for "Seven"
| Program | Date | Ref. |
|---|---|---|
| Inkigayo | July 30, 2023 | |
| Inkigayo | August 6, 2023 | |
| Inkigayo | August 13, 2023 | |
| M Countdown | July 20, 2023 | |
| M Countdown | July 27, 2023 | |
| M Countdown | August 3, 2023 | |
| Music Bank | November 10, 2023 | |
| Music Core | August 5, 2023 | |
| Music Core | August 26, 2023 | |
| Music Core | September 2, 2023 | |
| Music Core | September 9, 2023 | |
| Show Champion | August 2, 2023 | |
| Show Champion | August 9, 2023 | |

== Music video ==
An accompanying music video, directed by Bradley & Pablo, was released alongside the song and features South Korean actress Han So-hee as Jungkook's girlfriend. Chronicling an entire week (in reference to the song's lyrics), the video illustrates Jungkook comedically attempting to win back Han's affection, often to her annoyance.

=== Synopsis ===
Jungkook and Han holding hands in the aftermath of their chaotic relationship depicted throughout the music video.

The video opens with Jungkook and Han arguing at a restaurant on Monday, during which an earthquake causes a chandelier to crash down from the ceiling onto a table and the walls to explode. On Tuesday, he serenades her while hanging off the window of a train she is on then walks atop the train, following her as she switches cars. On Wednesday, Jungkook tries to capture Han's attention at a flooding laundromat, to which she responds angrily. On Thursday, he is hit by a car while attempting to give her flowers. On Friday, Jungkook follows her during a rainstorm, which culminates with him being blown away by the wind. Latto appears during Jungkook's funeral on Saturday and performs her verse atop his coffin at one point before he suddenly resurrects and greets Han. On Sunday, Jungkook sings to her while on a suspended platform. At the end of the video, which returns to the rainstorm on Friday, Han eventually reaches for Jungkook's hand and the two walk away together in the rain.

== Live performances ==
Jungkook performed "Seven" live for the first time on the day of its release, along with "Euphoria" and "Dynamite", in Central Park as part of Good Morning America's Summer Concert series. He appeared on BBC Radio 1's Live Lounge segment on July 20 and performed the song in studio together with a cover of "Let There Be Love" by Oasis. The following day, he performed the single on The One Show, on an outdoor stage next to the Thames River in London. Jungkook co-headlined the 2023 Global Citizen Festival on September 23 in New York City and performed "Seven" as part of his setlist, with Latto joining him onstage for the first time.

His only domestic performance of the song was on the July 30, 2023, episode of Inkigayo.

== Track listing ==
- CD single, digital download and streaming
1. "Seven" (Note: also labelled as "Seven" (Clean) or "Seven" (Clean ver.)) – 3:04
2. "Seven" (Explicit) – 3:04
3. "Seven" (Instrumental) – 3:04
- Digital EP (Weekday version)
1. "Seven" – 3:04
2. "Seven" (Explicit) – 3:04
3. "Seven" (Instrumental) – 3:04
4. "Seven" (Summer Mix) – 3:11
5. "Seven" (Band version) – 3:09
- Digital EP (Weekend version)
1. "Seven" (Clean) – 3:04
2. "Seven" (Explicit) – 3:04
3. "Seven" (Instrumental) – 3:04
4. "Seven" (Island Mix) – 3:06
5. "Seven" (Nightfall Mix) – 2:57
6. "Seven" (Festival Mix) – 3:00
7. "Seven" (Lo-fi Mix) – 3:21
- Alesso Remix EP
1. "Seven" (Clean) – 3:04
2. "Seven" (Explicit) – 3:04
3. "Seven" (Instrumental) – 3:04
4. "Seven" (Alesso Remix) – 2:42
- David Guetta Remix – digital single
1. "Seven" (David Guetta Remix) – 2:37
2. "Seven" (David Guetta Extended Remix) – 3:36

== Charts ==
=== Weekly charts ===
Weekly chart performance
| Chart (2023–2026) | Peak position |
|---|---|
| Argentina Hot 100 (Billboard) | 32 |
| Australia (ARIA) | 2 |
| Austria (Ö3 Austria Top 40) | 9 |
| Belgium (Billboard) | 19 |
| Bolivia (Billboard) | 4 |
| Bolivia (Monitor Latino) | 9 |
| Brazil (Billboard) | 18 |
| Canada Hot 100 (Billboard) | 5 |
| Canada CHR/Top 40 (Billboard) | 27 |
| Canada Hot AC (Billboard) | 32 |
| Chile (Billboard) | 12 |
| Colombia Streaming (Promúsica) | 5 |
| Costa Rica Airplay (Monitor Latino) | 11 |
| Croatia (Billboard) | 21 |
| Croatia International Airplay (Top lista) | 44 |
| Czech Republic Airplay (ČNS IFPI) | 41 |
| Czech Republic Singles Digital (ČNS IFPI) | 31 |
| Dominican Republic (SodinPro) | 4 |
| Ecuador (Billboard) | 7 |
| Ecuador (Monitor Latino) | 17 |
| El Salvador (Monitor Latino) | 16 |
| France (SNEP) | 12 |
| Germany (GfK) | 12 |
| Global 200 (Billboard) | 1 |
| Greece International (IFPI) Explicit version | 5 |
| Greece International (IFPI) Clean version | 30 |
| Hong Kong (Billboard) | 1 |
| Hungary (Single Top 40) | 13 |
| India (Billboard) | 3 |
| India International (IMI) | 1 |
| Indonesia (Billboard) | 1 |
| Ireland (IRMA) | 7 |
| Israel (Mako Hitlist) | 47 |
| Italy (FIMI) | 66 |
| Japan Hot 100 (Billboard) | 2 |
| Japan Combined Singles (Oricon) | 2 |
| Kazakhstan Airplay (TopHit) | 49 |
| Latvia Airplay (LaIPA) | 8 |
| Latvia Streaming (LaIPA) | 1 |
| Lithuania (AGATA) | 3 |
| Luxembourg (Billboard) | 1 |
| Malaysia (Billboard) | 1 |
| Middle East and North Africa (IFPI) | 1 |
| Mexico (Billboard) | 19 |
| Netherlands (Single Top 100) | 31 |
| Netherlands (Tipparade) | 22 |
| New Zealand (Recorded Music NZ) | 2 |
| North Africa (IFPI) | 6 |
| Nigeria (TurnTable Top 100) | 54 |
| Panama Airplay (Monitor Latino) | 5 |
| Panama International (PRODUCE) | 6 |
| Paraguay Airplay (Monitor Latino) | 3 |
| Peru (Billboard) | 2 |
| Philippines (Billboard) | 1 |
| Poland (Polish Streaming Top 100) | 13 |
| Portugal (AFP) | 7 |
| Romania (Billboard) | 9 |
| Russia Streaming (TopHit) (Note: The Russian Streaming chart was launched in late March 2025. Therefore, "Seven" did not have a full run on the chart.) | 95 |
| San Marino Airplay (SMRTV Top 50) | 4 |
| Saudi Arabia (IFPI) | 8 |
| Singapore (RIAS) | 1 |
| Slovakia Singles Digital (ČNS IFPI) | 35 |
| South Africa (Billboard) | 11 |
| South Korea (Circle) Clean version | 2 |
| South Korea (Circle) Explicit version | 47 |
| Spain (Promusicae) | 61 |
| Sweden (Sverigetopplistan) | 48 |
| Switzerland (Schweizer Hitparade) | 7 |
| Taiwan (Billboard) | 1 |
| Turkey (Billboard) | 24 |
| United Arab Emirates (IFPI) | 3 |
| UK Singles (Official Charts) | 3 |
| Uruguay Airplay (Monitor Latino) | 16 |
| US Billboard Hot 100 | 1 |
| US Adult Pop Airplay (Billboard) | 19 |
| US Dance Airplay (Billboard) | 20 |
| US Pop Airplay (Billboard) | 17 |
| Venezuela Airplay (Record Report) | 32 |
| Vietnam Hot 100 (Billboard) | 1 |

=== Monthly charts ===
Monthly chart performance for "Seven"
| Chart (2023) | Peak position |
|---|---|
| Brazil Streaming (Pro-Música Brasil) | 48 |
| Paraguay (SGP) | 18 |
| South Korea (Circle) Clean version | 3 |
| South Korea (Circle) Explicit version | 85 |

=== Year-end charts ===
2023 year-end chart performance for "Seven"
| Chart (2023) | Position |
|---|---|
| Brazil Streaming (Pro-Música Brasil) | 200 |
| Canada (Canadian Hot 100) | 65 |
| Global 200 (Billboard) | 17 |
| India International Streaming (IMI) | 12 |
| Japan (Japan Hot 100) | 29 |
| Philippines (Billboard) | 10 |
| South Korea (Circle) | 20 |
| US Billboard Hot 100 | 82 |

2024 year-end chart performance for "Seven"
| Chart (2024) | Position |
|---|---|
| Global 200 (Billboard) | 15 |
| India International Streaming (IMI) | 18 |
| Japan (Japan Hot 100) | 39 |
| Philippines (Philippines Hot 100) | 29 |
| South Korea (Circle) | 40 |

2025 year-end chart performance for "Seven"
| Chart (2025) | Position |
|---|---|
| Global 200 (Billboard) | 74 |
| Philippines (Philippines Hot 100) | 59 |
| South Korea (Circle) | 85 |

== Certifications ==
Certifications
| Region | Certification | Certified units/sales |
|---|---|---|
| Belgium (BRMA) | Gold | 20,000^{‡} |
| Canada (Music Canada) | 4× Platinum | 320,000^{‡} |
| France (SNEP) | Platinum | 200,000^{‡} |
| Italy (FIMI) | Gold | 50,000^{‡} |
| New Zealand (RMNZ) | Platinum | 30,000^{‡} |
| Portugal (AFP) | Gold | 5,000^{‡} |
| Spain (Promusicae) | Gold | 30,000^{‡} |
| United Kingdom (BPI) | Platinum | 600,000^{‡} |
| United States (RIAA) | Platinum | 1,000,000^{‡} |
Streaming
| Japan (RIAJ) Clean version | Platinum | 100,000,000^{†} |
| Japan (RIAJ) Explicit | Platinum | 100,000,000^{†} |
| South Korea (KMCA) Clean version | Platinum | 100,000,000^{†} |
^{‡} Sales+streaming figures based on certification alone.^{†} Streaming-only figures based on certification alone.

== Release history ==
Release dates and formats
| Region | Date | Format(s) | Version | Label | Ref. |
|---|---|---|---|---|---|
| Various | July 14, 2023 | Digital download; streaming | Original | Big Hit | |
| United States | July 14, 2023 | CD single | Original | Big Hit | |
| Various | July 17, 2023 | Digital download; streaming | Weekday EP | Big Hit | |
| United States | July 18, 2023 | Contemporary hit radio | Original | Big Hit; Geffen | |
| Various | July 21, 2023 | Digital download; streaming | Weekend EP | Big Hit | |
| Italy | July 24, 2023 | Radio airplay | Original | Universal | |
| United States | August 25, 2023 | CD single | Weekday; Weekend | Big Hit | |
| Various | August 25, 2023 | Digital download; streaming | Alesso remix | Big Hit | |
| Various | October 30, 2023 | Digital download; streaming | David Guetta remix | Big Hit | |
