= Dreamers (Jung Kook song) =

2022 single by Jungkook feat Fahad Al Kubaisi

Single by Jung Kook featuring Fahad Al Kubaisi

from the album FIFA World Cup Qatar 2022 Official Soundtrack
- Language: English; Arabic
- Released: November 20, 2022
- Studio: Katara Studios (Doha)
- Length: 3:21; 3:59 (Fahad Al Kubaisi version)
- Label: 2101
- Songwriters: Jung Kook; Mustapha El Ouardi; Patrick Devine; RedOne
- Producer: RedOne

Jung Kook singles chronology
"Left and Right" (2022)	"Dreamers" (2022)	"Seven" (2023)

Music video
- "Dreamers" on YouTube

"Dreamers" is a 2022 song by South Korean singer Jung Kook of BTS and Qatari singer Fahad Al Kubaisi. Part of the 2022 FIFA World Cup official soundtrack, the song was released on November 20 to coincide with the first match of that year's FIFA World Cup and its opening ceremony.

== Live performances and release ==
On November 19, Jung Kook's agency Big Hit Music announced via Weverse his participation in the 2022 FIFA World Cup opening ceremony. The next day, FIFA's official Twitter account shared a video of the singer teasing his upcoming performance. The performance featured Jung Kook in an all black suit surrounded by background dancers, being joined by Fahad Al Kubaisi wearing Qatari clothing midway through the performance.

== Music video ==
A music video for the Fahad Al Kubaisi version of the song was announced, with a scheduled release date of November 22 with the video being released on FIFA's YouTube channel.

== Charts ==
=== Weekly charts ===
Weekly chart performance
Chart (2022)	Peak position
Bolivia (Billboard)	18
Canada (Canadian Hot 100)	90
Global 200 (Billboard)	9
Greece International (IFPI)	34
Hungary (Single Top 40)	1
India International Singles (IMI)	4
Indonesia (Billboard)	3
Japan (Japan Hot 100)	6
Japan Combined Singles (Oricon)	23
Lebanon (Lebanese Top 20)	11
Lithuania (AGATA)	60
Malaysia (Billboard)	2
MENA (IFPI)	3
Netherlands (Global 40)	2
New Zealand Hot Singles (RMNZ)	3
Romania Airplay (TopHit)	75
Singapore (RIAS)	5
South Korea (Circle)	7
Switzerland (Schweizer Hitparade)	55
UK Indie (Official Charts)	21
UK Singles Downloads (Official Charts)	3
UK Singles Sales (OCC)	4
US Bubbling Under Hot 100 Singles (Billboard)	10
US Digital Song Sales (Billboard)	1
US Mainstream Top 40 (Billboard)	39
US World Digital Song Sales (Billboard)	1
Vietnam (Vietnam Hot 100)	2

=== Monthly charts ===
Monthly chart performance
Chart (2022)	Position
South Korea (Circle)	94

=== Year-end charts ===
Year-end chart performance
Chart (2022)	Position
Hungary (Single Top 40)	98

Year-end chart performance
Chart (2023)	Position
Global Excl. US (Billboard)	187
South Korea (Circle)	76

== Certifications ==
Certifications
Region	Certification	Certified units/sales
Brazil (Pro-Música Brasil)	Gold	20,000^{‡}
^{‡} Sales+streaming figures based on certification alone.
