= 3D (song) =

2023 single by Jung Kook featuring Jack Harlow

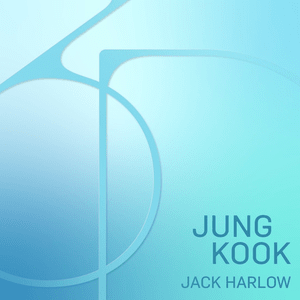
- CD and digital cover (Note: All versions feature the same artwork in different colors: orange for the alternate version, red for the remixes digital EP, black for the MK remix, and gold for the Justin Timberlake remix.)

Single by Jung Kook featuring Jack Harlow

from the album Golden
- Released: September 29, 2023 (original); November 24, 2023 (Justin Timberlake remix)
- Genre: Pop; R&B
- Length: 3:21
- Label: Big Hit
- Songwriters: BloodPop; David Stewart; Jack Harlow (Note: Justin Timberlake is additionally credited as a writer on the remix featuring himself.)
- Producers: BloodPop; David Stewart

Jung Kook singles chronology
| "Seven" (2023) | "3D" (2023) | "Too Much" (2023) |

Jack Harlow singles chronology
| "They Don't Love It" (2023) | "3D" (2023) | "Lovin on Me" (2023) |

Justin Timberlake singles chronology
| "Keep Going Up" (2023) | "3D" (Remix) (2023) | "Selfish" (2024) |

Music video
- "3D" on YouTube

"3D" is a song by South Korean singer Jung Kook of BTS featuring American rapper Jack Harlow, released as a single on September 29, 2023, through Big Hit Music. Described as a pop and R&B record, it was co-written by Jack Harlow and co-produced by BloodPop and David Stewart. It is featured on Jung Kook's debut studio album Golden, which was released on November 3, 2023. A remix featuring American singer Justin Timberlake instead of Harlow was released on November 24, 2023.

The song entered the charts in over forty countries including reaching the top ten in Australia, Canada, Greece, Japan, Latvia, New Zealand, Peru, Saudi Arabia, South Korea, Taiwan, Vietnam and the United States. In the United Kingdom, it made Jung Kook the first K-pop solo artist to achieve two consecutive UK top five entries on the UK Singles Chart.

== Background and release ==
On September 24, 2023, Big Hit Music announced "3D" as Jung Kook's second solo single, following the US Billboard Hot 100 number-one single "Seven" (2023). They teased: "Jung Kook's second solo single, '3D (feat. Jack Harlow),' is a pop R&B track with clever expressions of feelings toward an unattainable person from the perspectives of first, second, and third dimensions. Get ready to meet an even more mature side of Jung. Kook following 'Seven' Jack Harlow has featured in this track, bringing his unique rap style and adding zest to the song."

A remix by American DJ MK was released as a digital single on October 30, 2023.

== Commercial performance ==
"3D" debuted at number five on the UK Singles Chart, making Jung Kook the first Korean solo artist to earn two top-five singles in the United Kingdom; predecessor "Seven" debuted at number three a few months prior. Previously, the only other Korean solo artist to achieve two top-10 singles in the UK was Psy, with "Gangnam Style" (peaked at number one in 2012) and "Gentleman" (peaked at number 10 in 2013).

Jung Kook earned his second top-10 entry on the Billboard Hot 100—and Harlow his fourth—in the United States with "3D". The song debuted at number five, on the chart issue dated October 14, 2023, with 13.6 million streams, 3.1 million radio audience, and 87,000 sales. (Note: physical and digital singles combined) It was the best-selling digital single of its release week (period dated September 29–October 5), becoming both Jung Kook and Harlow's third number one on the component Digital Song Sales chart. Jung Kook is the first member of BTS to achieve multiple solo top-10 entries on the Hot 100.

Globally, "3D" sold 119,000 copies and accumulated 104.3 million streams during the period dated September 29–October 5, 2023. It became Jung Kook's second song to debut atop the Billboard Global 200 (chart issue dated October 14); he is the only member of BTS to achieve two number one songs as a solo artist. In territories outside of the US, "3D" sold 70,000 copies and accumulated 91 million streams for the same period, also debuting atop the Global Excl. US chart, earning Jung Kook his second number one on the ranking, after "Seven". For Harlow, the song became his first number one on both Global charts, after having previously achieved three top-10 entries only.

== Music video ==
Directed by Drew Kirsch, the music video shows Jung Kook singing the song while on the phone in a telephone booth then performing choreography with a group of dancers. Jack joins him for game of chess at a roadside cafe and raps his verses.

== Accolades ==
"3D" won three consecutive first-place trophies from October 5 to 19, 2023, on M Countdown, and two Melon popularity awards for the weeks ending October 9 and 16.

Awards & Nominations for 3D
| Award ceremony | Year | Category | Result | Ref. |
|---|---|---|---|---|
| Billboard Music Awards | 2024 | Top Global K-Pop Song | Nominated | |
| BMI Pop Awards | 2025 | Most Performed song of The Year | Won | |
| iHeartRadio Music Awards | 2024 | Best Music Video | Nominated | |

== Track listing ==
- CD single, digital download, and streaming
1. "3D" (explicit) – 3:21
2. "3D" (instrumental) – 3:19
3. "3D" (alternate version) (Note: A solo version by Jung Kook, without Jack Harlow.) – 2:42
- The Remixes digital EP
1. "3D" (explicit) – 3:21
2. "3D" (instrumental) – 3:19
3. "3D" (alternate version) – 2:42
4. "3D" (A. G. Cook remix) – 3:08
5. "3D" (clean version) – 3:22
6. "3D" (sped up) – 2:48
7. "3D" (slowed down) – 3:56
- MK Remix – digital single
1. "3D" (explicit MK remix) – 3:06
- Justin Timberlake remix – digital single
1. "3D" (Justin Timberlake remix) – 2:40

== Charts ==
=== Weekly charts ===
Weekly chart performance
| Chart (2023–2024) | Peak position |
|---|---|
| Argentina Hot 100 (Billboard) | 79 |
| Australia (ARIA) | 7 |
| Austria (Ö3 Austria Top 40) | 32 |
| Belarus Airplay (TopHit) | 9 |
| Bolivia (Billboard) | 14 |
| Brazil Hot 100 (Billboard) | 39 |
| Canada Hot 100 (Billboard) | 10 |
| Canada CHR/Top 40 (Billboard) | 32 |
| CIS Airplay (TopHit) | 8 |
| Ecuador (Billboard) | 19 |
| Egypt (IFPI) | 20 |
| Estonia Airplay (TopHit) | 24 |
| France (SNEP) | 49 |
| Germany (GfK) | 48 |
| Global 200 (Billboard) | 1 |
| Greece International (IFPI) | 8 |
| Hong Kong (Billboard) | 1 |
| Hungary (Single Top 40) | 40 |
| India (Billboard) | 16 |
| India International (IMI) | 1 |
| Indonesia (Billboard) | 1 |
| Ireland (IRMA) | 15 |
| Italy (FIMI) | 82 |
| Japan (Japan Hot 100) | 7 |
| Japan Combined Singles (Oricon) | 8 |
| Kazakhstan Airplay (TopHit) | 3 |
| Latvia (LaIPA) | 7 |
| Latvia Airplay (LaIPA) | 9 |
| Lithuania (AGATA) | 11 |
| Luxembourg (Billboard) | 17 |
| Malaysia (Billboard) | 1 |
| Malaysia International (RIM) | 1 |
| MENA (IFPI) | 1 |
| Moldova Airplay (TopHit) | 149 |
| Netherlands (Single Top 100) | 54 |
| New Zealand (Recorded Music NZ) | 9 |
| New Zealand Hot Singles (RMNZ) Justin Timberlake remix | 15 |
| Nigeria (TurnTable Top 100) | 64 |
| North Africa (IFPI) | 1 |
| Peru (Billboard) | 6 |
| Philippines (Billboard) | 1 |
| Poland (Polish Streaming Top 100) | 61 |
| Portugal (AFP) | 28 |
| Romania (Billboard) | 20 |
| Russia Airplay (TopHit) | 2 |
| San Marino Airplay (SMRTV Top 50) | 6 |
| Saudi Arabia (IFPI) | 3 |
| Singapore (RIAS) | 1 |
| Slovakia Singles Digital (ČNS IFPI) | 70 |
| South Africa (Billboard) | 24 |
| South Korea (Circle) | 8 |
| South Korea (Billboard) | 3 |
| Sweden (Sverigetopplistan) | 80 |
| Switzerland (Schweizer Hitparade) | 25 |
| Taiwan (Billboard) | 2 |
| UAE (IFPI) | 1 |
| UK Singles (Official Charts) | 5 |
| US Billboard Hot 100 | 5 |
| US Pop Airplay (Billboard) | 20 |
| Vietnam Hot 100 (Billboard) | 2 |
| Vietnam (IFPI) | 19 |

=== Monthly charts ===
Monthly chart performance
| Chart (2023–2024) | Position |
|---|---|
| Belarus Airplay (TopHit) | 11 |
| CIS Airplay (TopHit) | 11 |
| Estonia Airplay (TopHit) | 28 |
| Kazakhstan Airplay (TopHit) | 5 |
| Latvia Airplay (TopHit) | 7 |
| Lithuania Airplay (TopHit) | 44 |
| South Korea (Circle) | 21 |
| Russia Airplay (TopHit) | 7 |

=== Year-end charts ===
Year-end chart performance
| Chart (2023) | Position |
|---|---|
| CIS Airplay (TopHit) | 161 |
| Russia Airplay (TopHit) | 122 |
| US Digital Song Sales (Billboard) | 31 |

Year-end chart performance
| Chart (2024) | Position |
|---|---|
| Belarus Airplay (TopHit) | 53 |
| CIS Airplay (TopHit) | 96 |
| Global 200 (Billboard) | 129 |
| Kazakhstan Airplay (TopHit) | 58 |
| Lithuania Airplay (TopHit) | 85 |
| Russia Airplay (TopHit) | 72 |

== Certifications ==
Certifications
| Region | Certification | Certified units/sales |
|---|---|---|
| Canada (Music Canada) | 2× Platinum | 160,000^{‡} |
| New Zealand (RMNZ) | Gold | 15,000^{‡} |
| United Kingdom (BPI) | Silver | 200,000^{‡} |
Streaming
| Japan (RIAJ) | Gold | 50,000,000^{†} |
^{‡} Sales+streaming figures based on certification alone.^{†} Streaming-only figures based on certification alone.

== Release history ==
Release dates and formats
| Region | Date | Format(s) | Version | Label | Ref. |
|---|---|---|---|---|---|
| United Kingdom | September 29, 2023 | CD single | Alternate | Big Hit | |
| United States | September 29, 2023 | CD single | Original; alternate | Big Hit | |
| Various | September 29, 2023 | Digital download; streaming | Original; alternate | Big Hit | |
| Various | October 2, 2023 | Digital download; streaming | Remixes EP | Big Hit | |
| Various | October 30, 2023 | Digital download; streaming | MK remix | Big Hit | |
| Italy | November 9, 2023 | Radio airplay | Alternate | Big Hit | |
| Various | November 24, 2023 | Digital download; streaming | Justin Timberlake remix | Big Hit | |
