= Golden (Jung Kook album) =

- Digital cover

Studio album by Jung Kook
- Released: November 3, 2023
- Genre: Pop
- Length: 31:48
- Language: English
- Label: Big Hit
- Producers: Banx & Ranx; Jon Bellion; BloodPop; Cirkut; Diplo; DJ Snake; Leclair; Maesic; Allen Ritter; Johan "Roza" Rosa; David Stewart; Andrew Watt

Singles from Golden
- 1. "Seven" Released: July 14, 2023; 2. "3D" Released: September 29, 2023; 3. "Standing Next to You" Released: November 3, 2023; 4. "Yes or No" Released: September 13, 2024

Golden is the debut studio album by South Korean singer Jung Kook of BTS, released on November 3, 2023, through Big Hit Music. Primarily a pop record and an all English album, it was met with generally favorable reviews from critics. It features guest appearances by Jack Harlow, Major Lazer, Latto and DJ Snake. The album was supported by the pre-release singles "Seven" and "3D", as well as "Standing Next to You", which was released concurrently with the album, and "Yes or No", which was sent to Italian radio in 2024.

== Background and promotion ==
In July 2023, Jung Kook spoke to Variety about his first solo album, saying at the time that he was working on it but that it was too early to "mention anything specific". That same month, he released the single "Seven" featuring American rapper Latto, which debuted atop the US Billboard Hot 100 and reached the top 10 in numerous other countries. Jung Kook released another single, "3D" featuring American rapper Jack Harlow, on September 29.

Big Hit Music announced the 11-track album on October 3, including the previously released songs "Seven" and "3D". Golden takes its theme from the "golden moments" of Jung Kook as a solo artist. A press release further dubbed him the "Golden Maknae", referring to his status as the youngest member of BTS with a "unique timbre that will captivate listeners worldwide". In promotion of the album, Jung Kook is set to deliver "special stage performances and making various appearances alongside the release". The tracklist was revealed on October 15, including the third single released alongside the album, "Standing Next to You". On September 13, 2024, the album track "Yes or No" was sent to Italian radio as the album's fourth single.

=== Live performances ===
Jung Kook made a surprise concert at Times Square in New York City on November 9 and performed five tracks from the album: "Standing Next to You", "Yes or No", "3D", "Please Don't Change", and "Seven".

=== Documentary ===
A film documentary titled I Am Still, chronicling an eight-month period of Jung Kook's foray as a solo artist, beginning around the time of "Seven" and culminating with Golden, was announced on August 14, 2024. The singer previously teased the project in July. Distributed by Trafalgar Releasing, the film was released to theatres in 120 territories worldwide on September 18.

== Critical reception ==
Professional ratings
Aggregate scores
Source	Rating
Metacritic	75/100
Review scores
Source	Rating
AllMusic	4/5 stars
Consequence	75/100
Evening Standard	4/5 stars
The Guardian	3/5 stars
I	4/5 stars
IZM	2/5 stars
The Line of Best Fit	7/10
NME	4/5 stars
The Observer	3/5 stars

At Metacritic, which assigns a normalized score out of 100 to ratings from publications, the album received a weighted mean score of 75 based on six reviews, indicating "generally favorable reviews".

Rhian Daly of NME appreciated that Jung Kook "embodies each song's emotions and style with ease; a musical chameleon becoming each new sound". As best tracks she chose "what feel like classic pop king anthems", therefore "3D", "Yes or No", "Hate You" and "Too Sad to Dance", while she criticized "Somebody" for the use of the robotic processor. Overall she found that Golden manages to "capture Jung Kook's multifaceted artistry, charismatic vocals and irresistible pop appeal in 10 easily palatable songs primed for commercial success", but also that "it doesn't feel like an album he and he alone could have released", concluding that however "the 2020s have found their pop king and 'Golden' more than secures him the throne".

AP News's Maria Sherman called it "one of the strongest pop debuts of the year" and an "album of pop bliss", while for David Smyth of Evening Standard, the album "ticked a lot of boxes for pop lovers" and "what elevates it is his fluid, expressive voice, which consistently raises chart-friendly material to a higher plane". Consequence's Mary Siroky found that "the bright spots in the album are truly dazzling, while some of the b-sides aren't very memorable in comparison, and for that reason, the album feels quite top-heavy — the first five tracks are clear bangers, but the energy dips through the back half of the record", concluding that "even in the less enduring moments in Golden, Jung Kook remains interesting, wielding his voice with athletic precision".

For Ed Power of I, "Seven" and "3D" at the beginning of the album give the impression that "Jung Kook's solo career will be big on recycled ideas and NSFW lyrics", but "happily, that impression proves misleading. Golden traces the arc of a romance from infatuation to heartache. As the mood darkens, the tunes improve". According to The Observer's Michael Cragg, "Golden is full of bright spots, but only fully shines on occasion", "taking off when Jung Kook can focus on his honeyed falsetto" on "Standing Next to You" and "3D", while the use of sounds already experimented by singers such as Craig David and Justin Timberlake "highlight Jung Kook's struggle to find his own sound and identity".

The Guardian's Alexis Petridis wrote that "it's well-made, hooky – but nevertheless, Golden is an album bound to leave more agnostic listeners pondering what the fuss is about. [...] it just sounds like decent mainstream pop: there isn't anything happening sonically that sounds particularly unique or fresh", and called "Standing Next to You" "the only real misfire" that "starts fabulously – a big, splashy, live-sounding intro that could have stepped off Daft Punk's Random Access Memories – then devolves into pallid mid-tempo disco-house". IZM's Han Sung-hyun panned Golden, claiming it lacks individuality and "feels like listening to an algorithmically generated playlist".

Paste ranked the album number nine in their list of The 20 Best K-pop Albums of 2023.

== Accolades ==
Name of the award ceremony, year presented, award category, nominee(s) of the award, and the result of the nomination
Award ceremony	Year	Category	Result	Ref.
Asian Pop Music Awards (Note: Hosted by the Hong Kong Asia Pacific International Group and Sunway Records, the Asian Pop Music Awards bases its winners on the "Asian Pop Music Chart" which opened in September 2019.)	2023	Top 20 Albums of the Year (Overseas)	Won	
Asian Pop Music Awards	2023	Album of the Year (Overseas)	Nominated	
Billboard Music Awards	2024	Top K-Pop Album	Won	
Circle Chart Music Awards	2024	Artist of the Year – Album	Won	
Golden Disc Awards	2024	Best Album (Bonsang)	Won	
Golden Disc Awards	2024	Album Daesang(Album of the Year)	Nominated	
iHeartRadio Music Awards	2024	Favourite Debut Album	Nominated	
Korean Music Awards	2024	Best K-Pop Album	Nominated	
MAMA Awards	2024	Album of the Year	Nominated	
Melon Music Awards	2024	Millions Top 10	Won	
Melon Music Awards	2024	Album of the Year	Nominated	

== Commercial performance ==
Golden entered music charts in 25 countries and topped the South Korean, Belgian, French, Lithuanian, and Japanese album charts. It reached the top-10 in 14 countries including Australia, France, and Germany, and debuted at number three in the United Kingdom, becoming the highest-charting album by a Korean solo artist. In the United States, it debuted at number two on the Billboard 200 with 210,200 equivalent album units. This figure comprised 164,800 pure sales (128,500 CDs and 36,300 digital downloads), making it the top-selling album of the week; 29,800 SEA units (equaling 41.59 million on-demand official streams of its 10 songs); and 15,600 track equivalent (TEA) units. As of November 2023, it has sold over 2.4 million copies worldwide. Golden sold 244,000 copies in the United States during 2023 and ranked as the 10th bestselling CD album of the year according to Billboard.

According to the International Federation of the Phonographic Industry (IFPI)'s Global Music Report for 2023, Golden was the fourteenth most-consumed album across all formats, and the seventh best-selling album worldwide, having sold 2.7 million units in less than two months. (Note: The IFPI Global Albums chart ranks, in order, the albums that generated the most money globally across streaming, download, and physical record sales (combined) in a calendar year. The Global Album Sales Chart measures global unit sales across all physical formats, as well as full album downloads.)

== Track listing ==
Golden track listing
No.	Title	Writer(s)	Producer(s)	Length
1.	"3D" (featuring Jack Harlow)	Michael Tucker; David Stewart; Jack Harlow	BloodPop; Stewart	3:21
2.	"Closer to You" (featuring Major Lazer)	Gregory Aldae Hein; Jordan Douglas; Kurtis Wells; Tyshane Thompson; Emeric Boxall; Jamison Baken; Thomas Wesley Pentz; DJ Tay James	Diplo; Leclair; Maesic	2:51
3.	"Seven" (featuring Latto) (explicit version)	Andrew Watt; Henry Walter; Jon Bellion; Alyssa Stephens; Theron Makiel Thomas	Watt; Cirkut	3:04
4.	"Standing Next to You"	Watt; Walter; Ali Tamposi; Bellion	Watt; Cirkut	3:26
5.	"Yes or No"	Blake Slatkin; Walter; Ed Sheeran; Johnny McDaid	Watt; Cirkut	2:28
6.	"Please Don't Change" (featuring DJ Snake)	William Grigahcine; Adio Marchant; Yannick Rastogi; Zacharie Raymond	DJ Snake; Banx & Ranx	2:27
7.	"Hate You"	Walter; Peter Rycroft; Scott Harris; Shawn Mendes	Cirkut; LostBoy	2:34
8.	"Somebody"	Bellion; Allen Ritter	Bellion; Ritter; Johan "Roza" Rosa	2:49
9.	"Too Sad to Dance"	Stewart	Stewart	2:56
10.	"Shot Glass of Tears"	Stewart; Jessica Agombar; Michael Pollack; Hein	Stewart	2:47
11.	"Seven" (featuring Latto) (clean version)	Watt; Walter; Bellion; Stephens; Thomas	Watt; Cirkut	3:04
Total length:				31:48

== Charts ==
=== Weekly charts ===
Weekly chart performance
Chart (2023)	Peak position
Australian Albums (ARIA)	2
Austrian Albums (Ö3 Austria)	3
Belgian Albums (Ultratop Flanders)	5
Belgian Albums (Ultratop Wallonia)	1
Canadian Albums (Billboard)	4
Czech Albums (ČNS IFPI)	13
Danish Albums (Hitlisten)	7
Dutch Albums (Album Top 100)	10
Finnish Albums (Suomen virallinen lista)	12
French Albums (SNEP)	1
German Albums (Offizielle Top 100)	6
Greek Albums (IFPI)	17
Hungarian Albums (MAHASZ)	5
Icelandic Albums (Tónlistinn)	24
Irish Albums (Official Charts)	6
Italian Albums (FIMI)	3
Japanese Albums (Oricon)	1
Japanese Combined Albums (Oricon)	1
Japanese Hot Albums (Billboard Japan)	1
Lithuanian Albums (AGATA)	1
New Zealand Albums (RMNZ)	2
Norwegian Albums (VG-lista)	11
Polish Albums (ZPAV)	1
Portuguese Albums (AFP)	1
Scottish Albums (Official Charts)	6
Slovak Albums (ČNS IFPI)	8
South Korean Albums (Circle)	1
Spanish Albums (Promusicae)	8
Swedish Albums (Sverigetopplistan)	14
Swiss Albums (Schweizer Hitparade)	4
UK Albums (Official Charts)	3
US Billboard 200	2

=== Monthly charts ===
Monthly chart performance
Chart (2023)	Position
Japanese Albums (Oricon)	1
South Korean Albums (Circle)	2

=== Year-end charts ===
Year-end chart performance
Chart (2023)	Position
Austrian Albums (Ö3 Austria)	60
Belgian Albums (Ultratop Flanders)	196
Belgian Albums (Ultratop Wallonia)	154
French Albums (SNEP)	141
Global Albums (IFPI)	14
Hungarian Albums (MAHASZ)	47
Japanese Albums (Oricon)	18
Japanese Digital Albums (Oricon)	8
Japanese Hot Albums (Billboard Japan)	15
South Korean Albums (Circle)	8
Swiss Albums (Schweizer Hitparade)	90

Year-end chart performance
Chart (2024)	Position
Belgian Albums (Ultratop Flanders)	193
French Albums (SNEP)	171
Hungarian Albums (MAHASZ)	62
US Billboard 200	80

== Certifications and sales ==
Certifications and sales
Region	Certification	Certified units/sales
Canada (Music Canada)	Platinum	80,000^{‡}
France (SNEP)	Gold	50,000^{‡}
Italy (FIMI)	Gold	25,000^{‡}
Japan (RIAJ)	Platinum	250,000^{^}
New Zealand (RMNZ)	Gold	7,500^{‡}
South Korea (KMCA)	2× Million	2,000,000^{^}
South Korea (KMCA) Weverse Albums version	2× Platinum	500,000^{^}
United Kingdom (BPI)	Gold	100,000^{‡}
Summaries
Worldwide (IFPI)	—	2,700,000
^{^} Shipments figures based on certification alone.^{‡} Sales+streaming figures based on certification alone.

== Release history ==
Release dates and formats
Region	Date	Format(s)	Version	Label	Ref.
Various	November 3, 2023	CD; digital download; streaming	Standard	Big Hit	
United States	November 4, 2023	Digital download	Voice memo	Big Hit	
South Korea	November 8, 2024	Vinyl	Standard	Big Hit	
Japan	November 18, 2024	Vinyl	Standard	Big Hit	
Europe	December 13, 2024	Vinyl	Standard	Big Hit	
United States	December 13, 2024	Vinyl	Standard	Big Hit	
