= Fahad Al Kubaisi =

Qatari singer (born 1981)

- فهد الكبيسي
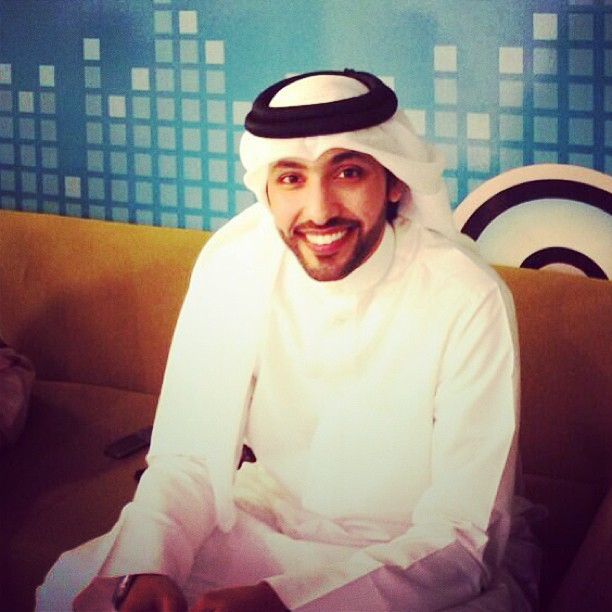
- Fahad Al Kubaisi in 2013
- Born: Fahad Khalid Abdullah Al Kubaisi; April 12, 1981 (age 45); Doha, Qatar
- Occupations: Singer; record producer; fashion model
- Years active: 1997–present
- Spouse: Noora Al Kuwari (m. 2005)
- Children: Khalid Alkubaisi - Alyaa Alkubaisi
- Musical career
- Genres: Khaliji (Gulf) music; World; Arabic music; Arabic pop music; Middle Eastern; Islamic
- Instruments: Vocals; Oud; Piano
- Labels: Rotana; Platinum Records; Fahad Al Kubaisi Productions
- Website: www.fahadalkubaisi.com

Fahad Al Kubaisi (Arabic: فهد الكبيسي; born April 12, 1981) is a Qatari singer, record producer and fashion model. His voice has been described as a "tender" baritone. He became successful in Arab states of the Persian Gulf and Maghreb. He is also famous for producing numerous genres of Khaliji music, which were well known throughout the Persian Gulf countries.

== Early life ==
Al Kubaisi was born in Doha on 12 April 1981 and grew up in a devoted Muslim family. He is the second son among eight children (eight boys), and held a bachelor's degree in physical education and sports science from Qatar University.

== Career ==
=== Islamic Music Career (1997–2005) ===
He began his artistic career as an Islamic singer when he was in high school. He performed several Islamic songs solo in 1997 and in 2001 he released his first album Jamaal El Rouh (The Beauty of the Soul), and in 2005, when he was a university lecturer, he released his second album Ela Rouhi (To my Soul).

=== Mainstream Arabic Pop Music Career (2006–present) ===
He began focusing on mainstream Arabic Pop field with the help of Qatari composer Matar Ali al-Kuwari in 2006. In the same year he recorded his first album Layesh (Why?). In 2010 he released his second album, Sah El Nawm, which was produced and distributed by Platinum Records.

In 2012, Fahad's career became increasingly successful and became popular, when he released his fourth album Tejy Neshaq, as his first album produced by himself. He worked on the music industry in collaboration with many musicians and poets, including James Horner, who created the music for Titanic and Avatar.

== Albums ==
Album name	Year	Genre
Jamaal El Rouh	2001	Islamic music
Ela Rouhi	2005	Islamic music and Middle Eastern
Layesh	2006	Khaliji (music) and Pop music
Asela	2008	Khaliji (music)
Sah El Nawm	2010	Khaliji (music)
Tejy Neshaq	2012	Khaliji (music)
Mazaji	2014	Khaliji (music) and Arabic pop music
Anta Eshq	2017	Khaliji (music) and World music
Dreamers (featuring Jungkook of BTS)	2022	World music

== Music videos ==
In 2014, Fahad filmed his solo song Wbadin in Turkey in the selfie way. His music video has been very successful as selfie Video Clip is the first of its kind in the history of the Arabic music industry. Fahad held a selfie stick and started walking around the streets of Istanbul. In 2015, he released a single song Batalna (We finished) in the style of Arabic pop music; it is the first music video in the Middle East filmed in the 360-degree video way.

== Awards ==
In 2018, Al Kubaisi won the "Best Male Khaleeji Singer Award" at the Golden Panther Music Awards in New York City.

At the jury of the Big Apple Music Awards, in July 2018, Al Kubaisi became the first Arabic music artist to be approved as a member of the jury, approved for the most important awards given to artists in music and singing categories. Al Kubaisi's song "Maslahtak" won the World Music award at the 2024 Hollywood Independent Music Awards.

== Soundtracks ==
- 2011: Black Gold
