= Euphoria (BTS song) =

Song by BTS

Song by BTS

from the album Love Yourself: Answer
- Released: August 24, 2018
- Recorded: 2017–2018
- Length: 3:49
- Label: Big Hit
- Songwriters: Jordan "DJ Swivel" Young; Candace Nicole Sosa; ”Hitman” Bang; Supreme Boi; Adora; Melanie Fontana; RM
- Producer: Jordan "DJ Swivel" Young

Music video
- "Euphoria: Theme of Love Yourself 起 Wonder" on YouTube

"Euphoria" is a song by South Korean boy band BTS, sung as a solo by member Jung Kook. It was released on August 24, 2018, with the compilation album Love Yourself: Answer. It was written by DJ Swivel, Candace Nicole Sosa, "Hitman" Bang, Supreme Boi, Adora, and RM, with DJ Swivel being the sole producer. Although the music video was released in April, the song was not released until August when Love Yourself: Answer was put out.

== Background and release ==
The music video was released as a theme for 起 Wonder, a part of the Love Yourself series. In a nine-minute depiction, the video continues the "Bangtan Universe" story line that is incorporated in many of BTS's music videos. BTS had previously hinted at the song title by displaying the word Euphoria during their live stage at the 2017 Melon Music Awards. Upon release, "Euphoria" trended worldwide and searches for the word increased 2883%. The song was also featured on the soundtrack to HBO's season 1 finale of Euphoria.

== Promotion ==
The song was promoted at the 2018 KBS Song Festival on December 29, 2018.

== Music video ==
The video incorporates scenes from previous BTS music videos that continue their in-universe story, showing each member as a character with different backgrounds and struggles. Scenes from previous videos include member V jumping into the ocean, Jungkook getting beaten by thugs, and other members trapped in fires and rooms. Member Jin recalls the memories of the seven of them together. Debussy's Clair de lune plays in the background before the actual start of the song.

The song plays scenes of the members playing around together outdoors, happy and carefree, with parallels of certain scenes to previous videos. In one of these parallels, the song ends as the seven members revisit the seaside where V had jumped. The Clair de lune plays once again as this time, in a sort of alternate universe-like twist, Jin takes V's place at the top of the pier, ready to jump instead of V. While V appears to notice that something is off, Jin peers down at his friends and records them with his video camera. Seeming content, he smiles before his video camera topples into the ocean, implying that Jin has jumped.

The music video was directed by Yong Seok Choi of Lumpens. The assistant director was Lee Wonju of Lumpens. Other key personnel were Nam Hyunwoo of GDW who was the director of photography, Song Hyunsuk from Real Lighting who was the gaffer, Emma Sungeun Kim of GE Production who was the producer, and the art directors Park Jinsil and Kim Bona of MU:E.

== Composition ==
The song started as a sole work by Candace Nicole Sosa with the title "Killing Time". Sosa contacted DJ Swivel for writing advice. It turned out the DJ was very interested in the song.

Musically, it has been described as a song with "future bass leanings" by Billboard. In an interview DJ Swivel explained how "Euphoria" was made. A guitar combined with a piano leads the opening of the song, and then drums were added. There are four different sounds used for the drums in the beginning. For the B-section the aim was to make it sound open and bright. The featured instrument there is the synth string sound, with a sub base anchoring the section. In certain sections of the song, vocal chops were placed in it to complement the lead vocal. After B-section, the chorus becomes the most important part of the song, with it being built around a main stab chord sound. The key of the song is in D major and is 105 beats per minute.

In an interview with Billboard, writer Melanie Fontana recalled that she wanted the chorus to explode with something more "chanty" but the crowd could sing along easily too. DJ Swivel stated the song "goes through a lot of different emotions" from beginning to end.

"Euphoria" embodied the "起" or "beginning" of the narrative sequence.

== Reception ==
The Grammys described "Euphoria" as "an art-pop rabbit hole looking to the future" while Billboard stated it was a big statement piece and set the overall tone of Love Yourself: Answer as optimistic. Rolling Stone included the song on its July 2020 list of the "75 Greatest Boy Band Songs of All Time", at number 34.

In the United States, "Euphoria" sold 15,000 digital copies its opening week, and was the 12th best-selling song in the country. In Canada, the song was the 19th best-seller upon release. Worldwide, it came in at number two for best selling songs.

== Credits and personnel ==
The song's credits are adapted from the CD liner notes of Love Yourself: Answer.

- Jordan "DJ Swivel" Young – producer, songwriter, all other instruments, mix engineer
- Candace Nicole Sosa – songwriter, guitar
- ”hitman” bang – songwriter
- Supreme Boi – songwriter
- Melanie Fontana – songwriter
- Adora – songwriter, chorus, digital editing, recording engineer @ Adorable Trap
- RM – songwriter
- Jungkook – chorus
- Slow Rabbit – additional production, vocal arrangement, recording engineer @ Carrot Express
- Hiss noise – digital editing
- Jeong Wooyeong – digital editing

== Charts ==
Chart (2018)	Peak position
Canada (Canadian Hot 100)	86
Hungary (Single Top 40)	9
French Downloaded Singles (SNEP)	47
Finland Digital Song Sales (Billboard)	7
Greece Digital Songs (Billboard)	17
Japan (Japan Hot 100)	76
Malaysia (RIM)	17
New Zealand Hot Singles (RMNZ)	9
Scottish Singles Sales (Official Charts)	49
Singapore (RIAS)	18
South Korea (Gaon)	11
South Korea (K-pop Hot 100)	2
UK Independent (OCC)	28
UK Singles Downloads (OCC)	45
US Bubbling Under Hot 100 (Billboard)	5
US World Digital Songs (Billboard)	1

== Certifications and sales ==
Region	Certification	Certified units/sales
New Zealand (RMNZ)	Gold	15,000^{‡}
United Kingdom	—	91,000
United States	—	15,000
Streaming
Japan (RIAJ)	Platinum	100,000,000^{†}
^{‡} Sales+streaming figures based on certification alone.^{†} Streaming-only figures based on certification alone.
