= Are You Sure? (TV series) =

South Korean reality series

- Hangul: 이게 맞아?!
- RR: Ige maja?!
- MR: Ige maja?!
- Genre: Reality
- Starring: Jimin; Jung Kook
- Country of origin: South Korea
- Original language: Korean
- No. of seasons: 2
- No. of episodes: 16 (8 in season 1, 8 in season 2)

Production
- Production locations: Connecticut, USA (season 1); Jeju Island, South Korea (season 1); Sapporo, Japan (season 1); Zermatt and Zurich, Switzerland (season 2); Da Nang, Vietnam (season 2)
- Running time: 55-114 minutes
- Production company: Disney+

Original release
- Network: Disney+
- Release: August 8, 2024

Are You Sure?! (Korean: 이게 맞아?!; lit. 'Is This Right?!') is a South Korean reality television series created by Hybe and Disney+, starring members of Korean boy group BTS, Jimin and Jung Kook. The eight-episode first season premiered on August 8, 2024, on Disney+, and features the two taking a break from their busy lives and traveling to Connecticut, Jeju Island, and Sapporo to spend days together for fun, food, and activities before they enlist in the military.

A second season, premiering on December 3, 2025, follows Jimin and Jung Kook as they spend 12 days in Switzerland and Vietnam with special missions and games. This season also contains eight episodes, with six in Zermatt and Zurich and two in Da Nang.

Big Hit Music releases photo books for both seasons.

== Cast ==
- Jimin as himself
- Jung Kook as himself

== Broadcast ==
The series are broadcast at Disney+. Three behind-the-scene videos are released in Weverse.

=== Filming ===
Filming for the first season took place in between Jimin and Jung Kook's schedule before they enlisted in military. For example, for episode 1 and 2, Jung Kook just finished his performance in Good Morning America and Jimin joined him for filming the episodes in New York and Connecticut. For the second season, Jimin and Jung Kook traveled right away only a few days after they were discharged from the military in June 2025.

=== Season 1 (2024) ===
Season 1 was filmed in 2023 during summer in America, fall in South Korea, and winter in Japan.

No. overall	No. in season	Original release date
1	1	August 8, 2024
From New York, Jimin and Jung Kook drive to Connecticut for kayaking and enjoying dinner cooked by themselves, steak and ramyeon, in a little wooden house. Jung Kook, unexpectedly, fell into the water when he attempted to kayak.
2	2	August 8, 2024
Jimin falls sick because of stomach bugs. Jung Kook creates a pile of stones and wishes for Jimin's health. Then the two goes on hiking in the forest. They visit a grocery store and eat pizza prepared by ARMY, their fan. Later they enjoy sunset from a yacht.
3	3	August 15, 2024
Now is fall in South Korea, and the two decide to spend several days of vacation in Jeju Island. Fellow BTS member, V, joins them for various activities, such as water gun fighting, go-karting, and climbing and jumping in an adult playground. Guest star: V as himself
4	4	August 15, 2024
Jimin, Jung Kook, and V are fishing and snorkeling in the sea and play around with each other in the swimming pool in their villa. For dinner, they eat sushi. Guest star: V as himself
5	5	August 22, 2024
They wrap up their time in Jeju. Jung Kook cooks for the entire team. Guest star: V as himself
6	6	August 22, 2024
As enlistment date is closer, Jimin and Jung Kook decides to spend their winter in Sapporo for good food and winter activities.
7	7	August 29, 2024
They go skiing and snowboarding as well as relaxing in the hot springs.
8	8	August 29, 2024
It is their last day in Sapporo as Jimin becomes melancholic. They reflect back on their adventure together. Jung Kook drives them back to the airport.

=== Season 2 (2025) ===
Season 2 was filmed in June 2025 after Jimin and Jung Kook were discharged from military, and the series was released on December 3, 2025.

No. overall	No. in season	Title	Original release date
9	1	"Is This Even a Trip?!"	December 3, 2025
Jung Kook and staffs surprise Jimin at his home to start the new season's journey. Not knowing their destination country since it is made as a secret, the two stay to a lodging near the Incheon International Airport and play flag guessing games to know which country they will travel to. Jimin guesses correctly that it is Switzerland. The next morning they fly to Switzerland and play another guessing games to earn more sleeping time.
10	2	"Unpredictable Adventures in the Alps"	December 3, 2025
They explore nearby areas, including paddle-boarding at Lake Cauma. They also play table tennis with a staff and make a bet on their pocket money.
11	3	"A Legendary Day beneath the Matterhorn"	December 10, 2025
Jimin and Jung Kook stay in Zermatt for several days. They went for outdoor activities: standing bike, short hiking, and paragliding in Gornergrat with the Matterhorn view. In the evening, they share a deep talk and Jimin treat the team for free drink.
12	4	"Laughter and Chaos in Zermatt"	December 10, 2025
Jimin and Jung Kook spend a magical night under the stars. The next day they must lead the filming crew take multiple train rides to Brienz from Zermatt. The train is broken, so they take a ferry ride instead and enjoy the lake view.
13	5	"Thrilling Freedom on the Lake"	December 17, 2025
Jimin and Jung Kook spend the day aboard a hot tug on Lake Brienz. Jimin cooks for dinner. The following day, Jung Kook attempts a canyon swing and must correctly recall and recite a keyword so that Jimin does not have to take the challenge.
14	6	"Unforgettable Punishment and Magical Evening"	December 17, 2025
Now Jimin and Jung Kook move to stay in Zurich for their last day in Switzerland. They undergo digital minimalism where the staffs keep their phone usage for an hour.
15	7	"A Chaotic Journey from Switzerland to Vietnam"	December 24, 2025
Their journey does not stop in Switzerland. Jimin mentions in the airport that he wants to visit Southeast Asia and eats good food, so the two travels to Da Nang, Vietnam, right away from Zurich while transiting in Seoul. They enjoy relaxing message, paddle boarding, and shopping in a Vietnamese market.
16	8	"The Final Adventure in Da Nang"	December 24, 2025
Jimin and Jung Kook enjoy a parasailing adventure on the beach and later take an evening sampan ride on the river.

== Reception ==
In its first 42 days, the first season became the most-watched non-drama, non-English language series on Disney+ worldwide.
