= Trouble Maker (EP) =

Extended play by Trouble Maker

EP by Trouble Maker
- Released: December 1, 2011
- Recorded: 2011
- Genres: Dance-pop; R&B
- Length: 13:25
- Labels: Cube; Universal Music
- Producer: Shinsadong Tiger

Trouble Maker chronology
Trouble Maker (2011)	Chemistry (2013)

Singles from Trouble Maker
- 1. "Trouble Maker" Released: December 1, 2011

Trouble Maker (Korean: 트러블메이커) is the debut extended play by South Korean duo Trouble Maker consisting of 4Minute's Hyuna and Beast's Hyunseung.

Released on December 1, 2011, the album marks the first collaboration between the two away from their groups. The duo promoted the album extensively, including numerous performances. The song "Trouble Maker" was used to promote the EP; it was performed at the 2011 and 2012 MAMA Awards, the latter at which it won the Best Collaboration award.

== Background ==
The mini-album consists of 4 tracks: the title track, "Trouble Maker"; a ballad called "The Words I Don't Want to Hear"; a collaboration song from HyunA and Rado, "Time"; and a solo song from Hyunseung, "Don't You Mind".

Trouble Maker won an Mnet M! Countdown award for their song "Trouble Maker". The song also won the Mutizen Song on Inkigayo on January 8. As of December 31, 2012, the song has surpassed 4,408,787 paid downloads.

== Promotion and release ==
On November 24, Cube Entertainment announced that HyunA and Hyunseung would form a sub-unit.

On November 26, 2011, Trouble Maker released the track listing for the then-upcoming debut album, as well as an audio teaser. Hyuna and Hyunseung also performed at the 2011 Mnet Asian Music Awards to further promote the album, showcasing provocative dancing and what was believed to be an intimate kiss, forcing a Cube Entertainment official to make a statement that "the kiss was not lip to lip, but actually lip to cheek."

Trouble Maker unveiled their first mini-album on December 1, 2011.

On December 6, 2011, HyunA and Hyunseung performed as Trouble Maker at the United Cube concert in London as part of their promotional tour. They then moved onto Brazil a week later.

After promotions for Trouble Maker began, the duo were forced to change their choreography due to it being considered too sexy for national broadcast. The new choreography was first performed on December 9's episode of Music Bank.

Since its release, it became an instant hit and its popularity soared. Numerous celebrities parodied "Trouble Maker", such as on KBS's Dream High, where After School's Kahi and actor Kim Jung Tae replicated the "Trouble Maker" stage. From TV shows, concerts, award shows and more, it is common to see parodies of the duo showing how big an impression HyunA and Hyunseung made on the industry. The song also received numerous first place award in various music show broadcasts: a triple crown in Mnet's M! Countdown (December 15, 22, 29), one in SBS Inkigayo (January 8), and one in JTBC's Music on Top (January 5).

== Music videos ==
The music video was released on December 1, 2011. At the end of the music video, HyunA sets the hotel room on fire, trapping Hyunseung. Hyunseung then shoots HyunA with a gun before she can leave.

== Track listing ==
No.	Title	Lyrics	Length
1.	"Trouble Maker"	Shinsadong Tiger, Rado, & EXID's LE	3:40
2.	"The Words I Don't Want To Hear (듣기 싫은 말)"	Rado	3:26
3.	"Time" (Hyuna featuring Rado)	Rado	3:30
4.	"Don't You Mind (아무렇지 않니)" (Hyunseung Solo)	Chun Goon	2:59
Total length:			13:25

== Charts ==
On December 24, 2011, 'Trouble Maker' debuted at number 1 on the Gaon Singles Chart. The song reached at the second position of the Billboard K-Pop 100 for the date of December 24, 2011.

=== Albums chart ===
Chart	Peak position
Gaon weekly chart	2
Gaon monthly chart	3

=== Sales ===
Chart	Sales
Gaon physical sales	36,427 (South Korea)

=== Singles chart ===
Song	Peak position	
Song	Gaon Chart	K-Pop Hot 100
"Trouble Maker"	1	2
"The Words I Don't Want to Hear"	53	52
"Time"	99	—
"Don't You Mind"	107	—

Year-end charts

Chart (2011)	Notes
Gaon Download chart	4,404,544 downloads

== Credits and personnel ==
- Hyuna – vocals, rap
- Hyunseung – vocals
- Shinsadong Tiger – producing, songwriting, arranger, music
- Rado – producing, songwriting, arranger, music
- LE – songwriting
