= Grown-Up (EP) =

Mini-album by F.T. Island

EP by F.T. Island
- Released: January 31, 2012
- Recorded: 2011
- Genre: Rock
- Length: 20:56
- Label: FNC Music, Mnet Media

F.T. Island chronology
| Memory in FTIsland (2011) | Grown-Up (2012) | 20 [Twenty] (2012) |

Singles from Grown-Up
- 1. "Severely" Released: January 31, 2012

Grown-Up is the fourth mini-album by South Korean rock band F.T. Island. It was released in South Korea on January 31, 2012, under FNC Music and distributed by Mnet Media. Filled with slow-tempo rock ballads, the album illustrated the musical growth of the band. Upon its release, the album and its single "Severely" (Korean: 지독하게) topped several music charts. The album debuted at number one on Gaon's weekly album chart and sold-out its initial 50,000 physically produced copies in ten days. The single peaked at number three on Gaon's weekly singles chart and earned F.T. Island several music television program awards, including three consecutive wins—dubbed a "Triple Crown"—on Joongang Tongyang Broadcasting Company's (jTBC) Music on Top.

== Composition ==
All five tracks on the album are slow-tempo rock ballads. Lead vocalist Lee Hongki explained that the band chose rock ballads to coincide with the cold weather in South Korea at the time. He labeled the songs as modern rock music that left out "any special effects or production", and described the musical content as the "basic band sound". FNC Media stated that Grown-Up "may be their best album yet", explaining that "fans will be able to experience how much they boys have matured musically". Writer Lee Da-hye of Yahoo! Korea felt that the album's content could "stimulate the emotions".

== Release and promotion ==
On January 27, 2012, F.T. Island released a music video teaser for "Severely". The mini-album Grown-Up and the full music video for "Severely" were both released on January 31. The music video starred Lee Hongki and a female trainee of FNC Media as his love interest. On that day, F.T. Island began promoting "Severely" by performing on Mnet's M! Countdown on February 2, 2012. They also made their comeback performances in the following days on Korean Broadcasting System's (KBS) Music Bank, Munhwa Broadcasting Corporation's (MBC) Show! Music Core and Seoul Broadcasting System's (SBS) The Music Trend.

On February 9, "Severely" earned its first K-Chart win on M! Countdown. F.T. Island won a second time on February 23. They won Joongang Tongyang Broadcasting Company's (jTBC) Music on Top on February 15, February 22 and February 29, the latter of which earned them a Triple Crown for their third consecutive win on the show. On February 26, the band won The Music Trend mutizen.

== Chart performance ==
Immediately after its release, Grown-Up topped physical and digital music charts. With one charting day, the album debuted at number three on the Gaon's monthly album chart of the month of January. After a full week of its release, Grown-Up went on to debut at number one on Gaon's weekly album chart. By February 9, 2012, ten days after its release, the album sold-out the 50,000 physical copies that were produced. Grown-Up went on to chart at number six on the monthly chart for the month of February.

== Track listing ==
| No. | Title | Lyrics | Music | Length |
|---|---|---|---|---|
| 1. | "Severely" (지독하게; Jidokhage) | Han Seong-ho | Kim Do-hun, Lee Sang-ho | 4:10 |
| 2. | "Even Had Lost a Friend" (친구마저 잃었다; Chingumajeo Irheotda) | Lee Hee-seung | Han Seung-hun | 4:14 |
| 3. | "I'm a Foolish Person" (난 못난 사람입니다; Nan Motnan Saramipnida) | Lee Hee-seung | Kim Jae-yang | 4:32 |
| 4. | "Grown Man..." (다 큰 남자가...; Da Keun Namjaga...) | Lee Seung-ho | Han Seung-hun | 4:09 |
| 5. | "We Hope to Become Lovers" (애인이 돼 주길 바래요; Aeini Dwae Jugil Baraeyo) | Han Seong-ho | Choi Jong Hun, Han Seung-hun | 3:51 |
| Total length: | | | | 20:56 |

== Chart history ==
| Chart (2011) | Peak position |
|---|---|
| South Korean Gaon album chart | 1 |
| South Korean Gaon domestic album chart | 1 |
