= Jang Hyun-seung =

South Korean singer

- 장현승
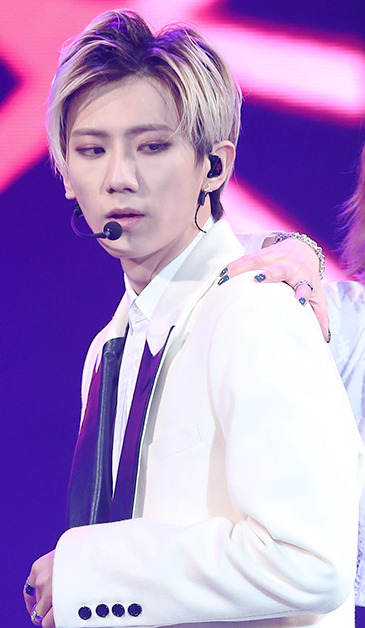
- Jang in 2014
- Born: September 3, 1989 (age 37); Suncheon, South Jeolla Province, South Korea
- Other names: So-1, JS (Jay Stomp), ABLE
- Occupation: Singer
- Musical career
- Genres: K-pop; R&B
- Instrument: Vocals
- Years active: 2009–present
- Labels: Cube Entertainment; Mine Field; MPLIFY Records
- Formerly of: Beast; Trouble Maker; United Cube

Korean name
- Hangul: 장현승
- Hanja: 張賢勝
- RR: Jang Hyeonseung
- MR: Chang Hyŏnsŭng

Jang Hyun-seung (Korean: 장현승; born September 3, 1989) most often credited as Hyunseung, is a South Korean singer. He is best known as a former member of the boy group Beast. With Beast, he has released singles and albums in both Korean and Japanese. Beast won the Artist of the Year (Daesang) award at the Melon Music Awards in 2011.

Hyunseung was also one half of the duo Trouble Maker with former Cube label mate, Hyuna. In December 2011, the duo released their debut extended play with eponymous lead single Trouble Maker. In October 2013, the duo released their second extended play, Chemistry, of which the title track "Now" was the first song to max out the score on music show Inkigayo with 11,000 points.

== Career ==
=== Pre-debut ===
In 2004, at the age of 15, Hyunseung took part in auditions for YG Entertainment. He was eliminated in the second round, but went to see CEO Yang Hyun-suk afterwards out of frustration at being eliminated and was accepted as a trainee.

For a year and four months, Hyunseung trained to debut as part of the boy group Big Bang. During this time, he used the stage name "So-1", a homonym for the Korean word for wish. He first gained media attention when he appeared in the group's pre-debut "Big Bang Documentary", along with members G-Dragon, T.O.P, Taeyang, Daesung, and Seungri. He appeared in 10 out of 11 episodes, but was cut from the group in a final elimination round against Seungri. Yang Hyun-suk said that Hyunseung's expressiveness and stage presence were underdeveloped at the time. Fellow Beast member Yoon Doo-joon decided to become a singer after watching the Big Bang documentary featuring Hyunseung. Hyunseung refers to his experiences at YG as important to his development as an artist.

Hyunseung later met future fellow band member Yang Yo-seob while they were working as dancers for a show performance team. Yoseob convinced Hyunseung to join Cube Entertainment, which ultimately led to his debut with Beast.

=== 2009–2014: Debut with Beast and Trouble Maker ===
Hyunseung debuted as part of Beast on October 5, 2009. In December 2010, Hyunseung teamed up with fellow member Lee Gi-kwang in a sub-unit to write and compose an R&B track titled "Let It Snow" as part of the group's digital album, My Story.

In December 2011, Hyunseung formed a unit with label mate Hyuna called Trouble Maker. Trouble Maker debuted with their eponymous lead single and extended play, Trouble Maker. On October 28, 2013, the unit released their second extended play, Chemistry, with the lead single "Now".

Hyunseung made his acting debut in the musical Mozart!. He performed as the lead character from late July 2012 to early August 2012 at the Sejong Center.

In April 2014, Hyunseung was cast in the musical Bonnie & Clyde. He performed as the lead character, Clyde, from April 15 to June 29, 2014 at the BBC Art Center along with other artists, including SHINee's Key, ZE:A's Park Hyung Sik, Kahi, and Oh So Yeon.

=== 2015–2021: Solo debut, departure from Beast ===
On May 7, 2015, Hyunseung released his debut solo extended play, My. Unlike BEAST's tracks, Hyunseung's album drew more from hip-hop culture and pop culture, such as title track "Ma First" featuring Giriboy and "Break Up With Him" featuring Dok2.

In April 2016, Hyunseung was nominated and won "Best Male Artist (South Korea)" at the 4th Annual V-Chart Music Awards in China. On April 19, 2016, Cube Entertainment announced he officially left Beast to continue as a soloist.

On July 29, 2016, Cube Entertainment announced that Hyunseung would be joining the dance competition program Hit The Stage, his first broadcast appearance since leaving Beast. On December 13, 2016, it was confirmed that Hyunseung had renewed his exclusive contract with Cube Entertainment.

On March 31, 2017, Cube Entertainment announced that Hyunseung would be featuring on singer Oh Ye Ri’s track "This Is Love". On July 27, 2017, Hyunseung released a digital single titled "Home".

On December 17, 2020, Hyunseung released the digital single "I Just Can't Stop Loving You" (Korean title: 차가운 너의 손을 따스히 감싸주고 싶어, literal translation "I want to wrap your cold hands warmly").

On August 3, 2021, Hyunseung's exclusive contract with Cube Entertainment expired.

In November 2021, Hyunseung confirmed his appearance on the Watcha original web variety show, Double Trouble.

=== 2022–present: ABLE ===
In September 2022, Hyunseung was signed to label Mine Field under the stage name 'ABLE'. He has released a digital single with a city pop genre under his stage name 'ABLE', titled "Feeling" on October 9, 2022.

Hyunseung released his second extended play, Unparadise, under his stage name 'ABLE' digitally on August 2, 2023. The EP includes three singles: "Paradise", "Ghetto", and "Last Night".

Hyunseung had mentioned through a paid communication platform in end-April 2024 that he had left Mine Field and was working with his new agency on music. MPLIFY Records, a label under Warner Music Korea, announced Hyunseung as a new artist under the label on April 9, 2025 and that he would be making a solo comeback with full-scale activities under his personal name 'Jang Hyunseung (장현승)' instead of his previous stage name 'ABLE'.

Hyunseung has created his official YouTube channel and has included an introduction video on his channel on April 18, 2025. He released a single, titled 'Orbit', on April 29, 2025.

== Personal life ==
Hyunseung was raised in Seoul, South Korea. He has a younger sister named Jang Geu-rim. His father died in 2012 from a sudden heart attack.

In 2010, Hyunseung was reported to be attending Dongshin University under a full scholarship, along with three other members of Beast. He was majoring in Applied Music. In 2019, his university degree was revoked by the Ministry of Education following an investigation into universities' special treatment for celebrities.

Military service

On June 12, 2018, it was confirmed that Hyunseung would be enlisting in the military starting July 24 as an active soldier. He was discharged on March 13, 2020.

== Discography ==
=== Extended plays ===
Title	Album details	Peak chart positions	Sales
Title	Album details	KOR	Sales
My	Released: May 8, 2015; Label: Cube Entertainment; Format: CD, Digital download; Track listing: 1. "It's Me"; 2. "Ma First" (feat. Giriboy); 3. "Breakup With Him" (feat. Dok2); 4. "Dirty Jokes"; 5. "Come Out"; 6. "I Said I Love You"	3	KOR: 21,925+
Unparadise	Released: August 2, 2023; Label: Mine Field; Format: Digital download; Track listing: 1. "Side Effects"; 2. "뭐가 미안해" ("What are you sorry about") (feat. Choisul); 3. "Last Night" (feat. Owen); 4. "Paradise"; 5. "What Should I Do"; 6. "Ghetto"; 7. "Reminiscence (Interlude)"; 8. "Daisy Remix" (feat. ARON, INJAE)	—	—N/a
"—" denotes releases that did not chart or were not released in that region.

=== Singles ===
Title	Year	Peak positions	Sales	Album
Title	Year	KOR	Sales	Album
"Ma First" (featuring Giriboy)	2015	28	KOR: 116,414	My
"Break up With Him" (featuring Dok2)	2015	70	KOR: 23,804	My
"Home"	2017	—	—N/a	Non-album singles
"I Just Can't Stop Loving You" ("차가운 너의 손을 따스히 감싸주고 싶어")	2020	—	—N/a	Non-album singles
"Feeling"	2022	—	—N/a	Non-album singles
"Daisy" (featuring Han Yo-han)	2023	—	—N/a	Non-album singles
"Last night" (featuring Owen)	2023	—	—N/a	Unparadise
"Ghetto"	2023	—	—N/a	Unparadise
"Orbit"	2025	—	—	Non-album singles
"Mess"	2025	—		Non-album singles
"—" denotes releases that did not chart or were not released in that region.

=== Other charted songs ===
Title	Year	Peak positions	Sales	Album
Title	Year	KOR	Sales	Album
"Dirty Jokes"	2015	100	KOR: 17,804	My
"I Said I Love You"	2015	— (Note: "I Said I Love You" did not enter the Gaon Digital Chart, but peaked at number 95 on the Gaon Download Chart.)	KOR: 12,617	My
"—" denotes releases that did not chart or were not released in that region.

=== Features, OST and Sound source ===
Year	Date	Title	Artist	Album	Remarks
2011	05.09	“Loving U”	Yoon Doojoon, Jang Hyunseung, Yang Yoseob	All My Love OST	–
2012	07.03	“나는 나는 음악” (“I Am, I’m Music”)	Jang Hyunseung	–	Mozart! Musical
2013	01.03	“일년전에” (“One Year Ago”)	Jang Hyun-seung, Jung Eun-ji, and Kim Nam-joo	‘A CUBE’ FOR SEASON #WHITE	
2013	12.14	“웨딩케익” (“Wedding Cake”)	Jang Hyun-seung	–	Immortal Songs: Singing the Legend
2014	06.07	“꽃밭에서” (“At the Flower Garden”)	Jang Hyun-seung	–	Immortal Songs: Singing the Legend
2014	06.14	“사랑의 슬픔” (“Sorrow of Love”)	Jang Hyun-seung	–	Immortal Songs: Singing the Legend
2016	12.16	“Special Christmas”	Hyuna, Jang Hyun-seung, BtoB, Roh Ji-hoon, CLC, Pentagon	2016 United Cube Project Part 1	–
2017	04.01	“This Is Love”	Oh Ye Ri (Feat. Jang Hyun-seung)	This Is Love	–
2021	12.31	“Dr.베베” (“Dr. Bebe”)	Jang Hyun-seung, Jeon Ji-woo	-	Double Trouble
2022	01.14	“Rainism"	Jang Hyun-seung, Jeon Ji-woo	-	Double Trouble
2022	01.28	“Love me or Leave me"	Jang Hyun-seung, Monday	-	Double Trouble
2022	02.18	“When We Disco"	Jang Hyun-seung, Minzy	-	Double Trouble
2022	03.04	“Hush"	Jang Hyun-seung, Park Cho-a	-	Double Trouble
2023	03.08	“FREAKY (Prod. hyeminsong)”	Swings, Chillin Homie, Choo Seo-jun, Xeeyon, Vapo, MASON HOME, JINBO, JJang-i-no-chang, ABLE	FREAKY (Prod. hyeminsong)	–
2023	05.02	"라운지에서 (Prod. JINBO)" ("In the Lounge (Prod. JINBO)")	Swings, Chillin Homie, iiso, JINBO, Noh Yoon-ha, Da-min, ABLE	Dingo X Mine Field	–
2023	05.10	"Invasion (Prod. niceshotnick)"	Swings, ksmartboi, YULEUM, ABLE	AP Alchemy: Side P	–

=== Korea Music Copyright Association (KOMCA) Details ===
Registration name	ID	Webpage
장현승; Jang Hyun-seung	W1041700	

=== Songwriting credits ===
Year	Album	Artist	Song	Lyrics		Music	
Year	Album	Artist	Song	Credited	With	Credited	With
2009	Beast Is the B2ST	BEAST	"Beast Is the B2ST"	Yes	BEAST	No	Shinsadong Tiger, Choi Gyu Seong
2009	Beast Is the B2ST	BEAST	"Bad Girl"	Yes	BEAST, Lee Sang Ho, Shinsadong Tiger	No	Lee Sang Ho, Shinsadong Tiger
2010	My Story	BEAST (Gikwang & Hyunseung)	"Let It Snow"	Yes	Lee Gi-kwang	No	Choi Gyu Seong
2017	Non-album singles	Oh Ye Ri (Feat. Jang Hyunseung)	"This is Love"	No	Oh Ye Ri	Yes	Oh Yeri, Wild Boar, mOnSteR nO.9, Chris Kim
2020	Non-album singles	Jang Hyunseung	"I Just Can't Stop Loving You" ("차가운 너의 손을 따스히 감싸주고 싶어")	Yes	—N/a	Yes	Chiic, Johnny, Stally
2022	Non-album singles	ABLE	"Feeling"	Yes	—N/a	Yes	Rado
2023	Non-album singles	ABLE (Feat. Han Yo-han)	"Daisy"	Yes	Han Yo-han	Yes	niceshotnick
2023	Non-album singles	Swings, Chillin Homie, Choo Seo-jun, Xeeyon, Vapo, MASON HOME, JINBO, JJang-i-no-chang, ABLE	"FREAKY (Prod. hyeminsong)"	Yes	Swings, Chillin Homie, Choo Seo-jun, Xeeyon, Vapo, MASON HOME, JINBO, JJang-i-no-chang	Yes	Swings, Chillin Homie, Choo Seo-jun, Xeeyon, Vapo, MASON HOME, JINBO, JJang-i-no-chang, hyeminsong
2023	Dingo X Mine Field	Swings, Chillin Homie, iiso, JINBO, Noh Yoon-ha, Da-min, ABLE	"라운지에서 (Prod. JINBO)" ("In the Lounge (Prod. JINBO)")	Yes	Swings, Chillin Homie, iiso, JINBO, Noh Yoon-ha, Da-min	Yes	Swings, MASON HOME, Chillin Homie, iiso, JINBO, Noh Yoon-ha, Da-min
2023	AP Alchemy: Side P	Swings, ksmartboi, YULEUM, ABLE	"Invasion (Prod. niceshotnick)"	Yes	Swings, ksmartboi, YULEUM	Yes	Swings, ksmartboi, YULEUM, niceshotnick
2023	Unparadise	ABLE	"Side effect"	Yes	—N/a	Yes	Just Nochang, TE'O, Namguitar
2023	Unparadise	ABLE (Feat. Choisul)	"뭐가 미안해" ("What are you sorry about")	Yes	Choisul	Yes	Choisul, tuna
2023	Unparadise	ABLE (Feat. Owen)	"Last night"	Yes	Owen	Yes	ARON, niceshotnick, Eskimo
2023	Unparadise	ABLE	"Paradise"	Yes	—N/a	Yes	ARON, tuna
2023	Unparadise	ABLE	"What Should I Do"	Yes	—N/a	Yes	ARON, Choisul, niceshotnick
2023	Unparadise	ABLE	"Ghetto"	Yes	—N/a	Yes	Wiz World
2023	Unparadise	ABLE (Feat. ARON, INJAE)	"Daisy Remix"	Yes	ARON, INJAE	Yes	ARON, INJAE, niceshotnick
2023	in door	Chu Seo Jun (Feat. GEMma, ABLE)	"Starz"	Yes	Chu Seo Jun, GEMma	Yes	Chu Seo Jun, GEMma, niceshotnick, Mil House
2025	TBA	Jang Hyunseung	"Orbit"	Yes	—N/a	Yes	FAIELO, Bae Jin-seok

=== Music videos ===
Year	Title	Ref
2013	"일년전에" (“One Year Ago”)	One Year Ago
2015	"Ma First"	Ma First
2020	"I Just Can't Stop Loving You" ("차가운 너의 손을 따스히 감싸주고 싶어")	I Just Can't Stop Loving You
2022	"Feeling"	Feeling
2023	"Daisy" (Feat. Han Yo-han)	Daisy (Visualizer)
2023	"FREAKY (Prod. hyeminsong)"	FREAKY (Prod. hyeminsong)
2023	"라운지에서 (Prod. JINBO)" ("In the Lounge (Prod. JINBO)")	In the Lounge (Prod. JINBO)
2023	"Paradise"	Paradise
2025	"Orbit"	Orbit

== Filmography ==
=== Reality shows and documentary ===
Year	Title	Note
2006	Big Bang: The Beginning	Episodes 1 - 10

=== Variety shows ===
Year	Title	Role	Note
2013-2014	Immortal Songs: Singing the Legend	Guest	Episodes 131, 151, 152
2016	Hit the Stage	Contestant	Episodes 3-8
2025	King of Mask Singer	Contestant	"Pretzel" in Episodes 490-491

=== Web shows ===
Year	Title	Network	Role	Ref.
2021	Double Trouble	Watcha	Contestant	Episodes 1-10
2022	AVA Dream (아바드림)	TV CHOSUN	Guest	Episode 8
2024	Zip Daesung	YouTube	Guest	Episode 1

=== Musical theatre ===
Year	Title	Role	Notes
2012	Mozart!	Mozart	Lead Role
2014	Bonnie & Clyde	Clyde	Lead Role

== Awards and nominations ==
Year	Award	Category	Nominated work	Result
2016	The 4th V Chart Awards	Top Male Artist-Korea	Hyunseung	Won
