= Dongshin University =

University in Naju, South Korea

Coordinates: 35.0497°N 126.7177°E

- Hangul: 동신대학교
- Hanja: 東新大學校
- RR: Dongsin daehakgyo
- MR: Tongsin taehakkyo

Dongshin University (Korean: 동신대학교) is a private university in southwestern South Korea. Its campus is located in Naju, a city in South Jeolla province which borders Gwangju. It enrolls about 7,000 students; the class of 2003 contained 1,378 students . The current president is Kyun-Bum Lee.

== Academics ==
Engineering, originally the school's sole focus, continues to be that of its College of Engineering. Additional undergraduate courses of study are provided through the College of Information and Science, College of Humanities and Social Science, College of Art, and College of Oriental Medicine. The university provides graduate instruction through its general graduate school, as well as the graduate schools of education and social development.

== History ==
Having received permission to open in July 1985, the school held its first classes in 1987. At that time it bore the name Dongshin College of Engineering (동신공과학대학). The current name was adopted when the school gained university status in 1992.

On January 14, 2019, the Ministry of Education canceled the degrees for the following celebrities, due to special treatment:

- Chu Ga-Yeol, singer, song-writer
- Jang Hyun-seung, singer (former BEAST and Trouble Maker)
- Lee Gi-Kwang, singer (Highlight)
- Seo Eunkwang, singer (BtoB)
- Yong Jun-hyung, rapper (former Highlight)
- Yoon Doo-joon, singer (Highlight)
- Yook Sung-jae, singer (BtoB)

== Sister schools ==
Dongshin University maintains international ties with 12 universities in China, 5 in the United States, and 1 each in Canada (University of Alberta), Japan (Momoyama Gakuin University), Indonesia (Pancasila University), and Australia (Edith Cowan University).

== Notable alumni ==
- Chu Ga-Yeol, singer, song-writer
- Jang Hyun-seung, singer (former BEAST and Trouble Maker)
- Kim Mi-sook, actress
- Lee Gi-Kwang, singer (Highlight)
- Leo, singer (VIXX)
- Seo Eunkwang, singer (BtoB)
- Yong Jun-hyung, rapper (former Highlight)
- Yoon Doo-joon, singer (Highlight)
- Yook Sung-jae, singer (BtoB)

== See also ==
- List of colleges and universities in South Korea
- Education in South Korea
