= List of Inkigayo Chart winners (2013) =

Inkigayo Chart winners (2013)

The Inkigayo Chart is a music program record chart that gives an award to the best-performing single of the week in South Korea. The chart measured digital performance in domestic online music services (60%), social media via YouTube views (35%), and advanced viewer votes (5%), in its ranking methodology. The candidates for the number-one song of the week received additional points from live votes.

== Chart history ==
Key
†	Indicates the song achieved a Triple Crown
‡	Indicates the highest score of the year
—	No show was held

Episode	Date	Artist	Song	Points	Ref.
713	March 17	Shinee	"Dream Girl"	9,224	
714	March 24	Lee Hi	"It's Over"	9,126	
715	March 31	Infinite	"Man In Love"	7,893	
716	April 7	Infinite	"Man In Love"	8,291	
717	April 14	Lee Hi	"Rose"	9,142	
718	April 21	Psy	"Gentleman" †	9,712	
719	April 28	Psy	"Gentleman" †	9,751	
720	May 5	Psy	"Gentleman" †	9,354	
—	May 12	Chungju World Rowing Championship Special			
721	May 19	4Minute	"What's Your Name?"	8,419	
722	May 26	4Minute	"What's Your Name?"	10,230	
723	June 2	Lee Hyori	"Bad Girls"	10,308	
724	June 9	CL	"The Baddest Female"	9,222	
725	June 16	Exo	"Wolf"	7,876	
726	June 23	Sistar	"Give It To Me"	10,503	
727	June 30	Sistar	"Give It To Me"	10,554	
— (Note: No broadcast due to special coverage of the Asiana Airlines crash.)	July 7	Girl's Day	"Female President"	8,887	
728	July 14	First Half of the Year Special			
729	July 21	2NE1	"Falling In Love"	10,260	
730	July 28	Infinite	Destiny"	9,771	
731	August 4	Beast	"Shadow"	9,149	
732	August 11	f(x)	"Rum Pum Pum Pum"	9,674	
733	August 18	Exo	"Growl" †	10,628	
734	August 25	Exo	"Growl" †	9,518	
735	September 1	Exo	"Growl" †	9,313	
736	September 8	Teen Top	"Rocking"	8,075	
737	September 15	G-Dragon	"Coup D'état"	7,437	
738	September 22	G-Dragon	"Crooked"	8,230	
739	September 29	G-Dragon	"Crooked"	8,123	
740	October 6	Busker Busker	"Love, At First"	8,163	
741	October 13	Block B	"Very Good"	8,069	
742	October 20	IU	"The Red Shoes"	10,521	
743	October 27	Shinee	"Everybody"	10,735	
744	November 3	K.Will	"You Don't Know Love"	9,609	
745	November 10	Trouble Maker	"Now"	11,000 ‡	
746	November 17	Miss A	"Hush"	8,559	
747	November 24	Taeyang	"Ringa Linga"	8,023	
748	December 1	2NE1	"Missing You"	9,858	
749	December 8	2NE1	"Missing You"	9,773	
750	December 15	Exo	"Miracles in December"	9,242	
751	December 22	Exo	"Miracles in December"	10,302	
—	December 29	IU	"Friday"	7,907	
