= Chemistry (Trouble Maker EP) =

EP by Trouble Maker
- Released: October 28, 2013
- Recorded: 2013
- Genre: Pop; R&B
- Label: Cube; Universal Music
- Producer: Shinsadong Tiger

Trouble Maker chronology
Trouble Maker (2011)	Chemistry (2013)

Singles from Chemistry
- 1. "Now" Released: October 28, 2013

Chemistry is the second and final extended play by South Korean duo Trouble Maker, which consists of 4Minute's Hyuna and Beast's Hyunseung. It was released digitally on October 28, 2013 with the lead single "Now" (Korean: 내일은 없어; RR: Naeireun Eopseo; lit. "No Tomorrow").

== Promotion and release ==
On October 4, 2013, Cube Entertainment revealed that Trouble Maker would be making their comeback. A representative said, "We have established their comeback as Trouble Maker to be made on the October 24 episode of Mnet's 'M! Countdown'. As it has been a while since they were active as a unit, the both of them are fully engaged in practice and very nervous."

On October 23, a teaser video and photo was released which showcased a sexy concept; the release date was clarified to be October 28, and the lead single would be called "Now" (Korean: 내일은 없어). On October 26, the official site was launched, showing 12 different teaser photos. The album was released on digital download on October 28, and on physical album on October 31. A special limited edition (3,000 copies), rated 19+, was released on November 12. Cube said this version shows a "level of allure and sexuality exceeding that of Trouble Maker as everyone knows it now".

Trouble Maker began promoting "Now" on October 30 on MBC Music's Show Champion The song received numerous first place awards in various music show broadcasts, a double crown in Mnet's M! Countdown (November 7, 14) and in KBS Music Bank (November 8,15), in MBC Music Core (November 9), in SBS Inkigayo (November 10) and a triple crown in MBC Music Show Champion (November 6, 13, 20).

== Music video ==
The music video for "Now", released on October 24, was directed by Lee Gi-baek who also directed Beast's "Caffeine", "Shadow (Geurimja)" and "I'm Sorry". The choreography was done by Keone Madrid and Mariel Madrid, who have worked with Urban Dance Camp in Germany.

The music video has a "Bonnie and Clyde" theme. Jeff Benjamin of Billboard K-Town wrote that the video "feels like a concentrated effort to get Western attention". He also said, "'Now' shows the two K-pop idols engaging in very un-idol-like behavior: smoking cigarettes, drinking beer, there's even an implied threesome with Hyunseung. Still, it's the type of shock tactics that American pop fans have become indifferent to."

On November 3, 2013, Trouble Maker released an uncut version of the music video, which was twice as long as the original.

== Track listing ==
Digital download
No.	Title	Lyrics	Music	Length
1.	"Volume Up" (볼륨을 높이고; Volume Nopigo)	Goodnite, Sleepwell	Goodnite, Sleepwell	3:07
2.	"Now" (내일은 없어; Naeireun Eopseo)	Shinsadong Tiger, Rado, LE	Shinsadong Tiger, Rado	3:40
3.	"Player" (놀고 싶은 Girl; Nolgo Sipeun Girl) (Hyunseung featuring Hyuna)	Hyuna, Jeon Seung-woo	Jeon Seung-woo	3:47
4.	"Attention (Illy)" (이리 와; Iri Wa)	Peter, Young Sky, Jinoo	Peter, Young Sky, Jinoo	3:27
5.	"I Like" (Hyuna featuring Flowsik)	Jae Chong, Gyeol, Flowsik	Jae Chong	3:32

== Charts ==
On November 7, 2013, "Now" debuted at number 1 on the Gaon Digital Chart. The song reached the top of the Billboard K-Pop Hot 100 for the date of November 16, 2013.

=== Albums chart ===
Chart	Peak position
Gaon weekly chart	2
Gaon monthly chart	4

=== Sales ===
Chart	Sales
Gaon physical sales	30,934

=== Singles chart ===
Song	Peak position	
Song	Gaon Chart	K-Pop Hot 100
"Now"	1	1
"Turn Up the Volume"	13	29
"A Girl Who Wants to Play"	38	—
"Attention"	20	72
"I Like It"	30	73

== Release history ==
Country	Date	Format	Label
South Korea	October 28, 2013	Digital download	Cube Entertainment
South Korea	October 31, 2013	CD	Cube Entertainment
South Korea	November 12, 2013	Limited edition CD	Cube Entertainment

== Personnel ==
- Hyuna – vocals, rap
- Hyunseung – vocals
- Shinsadong Tiger – producing, songwriting, arranger, music
- Rado – producing, songwriting, arranger, music
- LE – songwriting
