= Severely =

Single by F.T. Island

from the EP Grown-Up
- Language: Korean
- Released: January 31, 2012
- Genre: Rock
- Length: 4:10
- Label: FNC Music
- Songwriters: Han Seong-ho; Kim Do-hun; Lee Sang-ho

F.T. Island Korean singles chronology
"Like Birds" (2011)	"Severely" (2012)	"I Wish" (2012)

"Severely" (Korean: 지독하게; RR: Jidokhage; also translated as "Fiercely") is a song by South Korean idol rock band F.T. Island. It was released on January 31, 2012, under FNC Music and serves as the lead single of the band's fourth mini-album Grown-Up. A rock ballad, the song was written by Han Seong-ho, and composed by Kim Do-hun and Lee Sang-ho.

"Severely" peaked at number three on South Korea's national Gaon Digital Chart and the Billboard Korea K-Pop Hot 100, spending two consecutive weeks at its peak on both charts. The song earned F.T. Island three consecutive wins—dubbed a "Triple Crown"—on JTBC's music television program Music on Top, in addition to two wins on Mnet's M Countdown and one win on Seoul Broadcasting System's (SBS) Inkigayo.

== Composition ==
"Severely" is a slow-tempo rock ballad. The song was written by Han Seong-ho, composed by Kim Do-hun and Lee Sang-ho, and arranged by the latter; it was composed in the key of E major using common time with a tempo of 71 beats per minute.

== Release and promotion ==
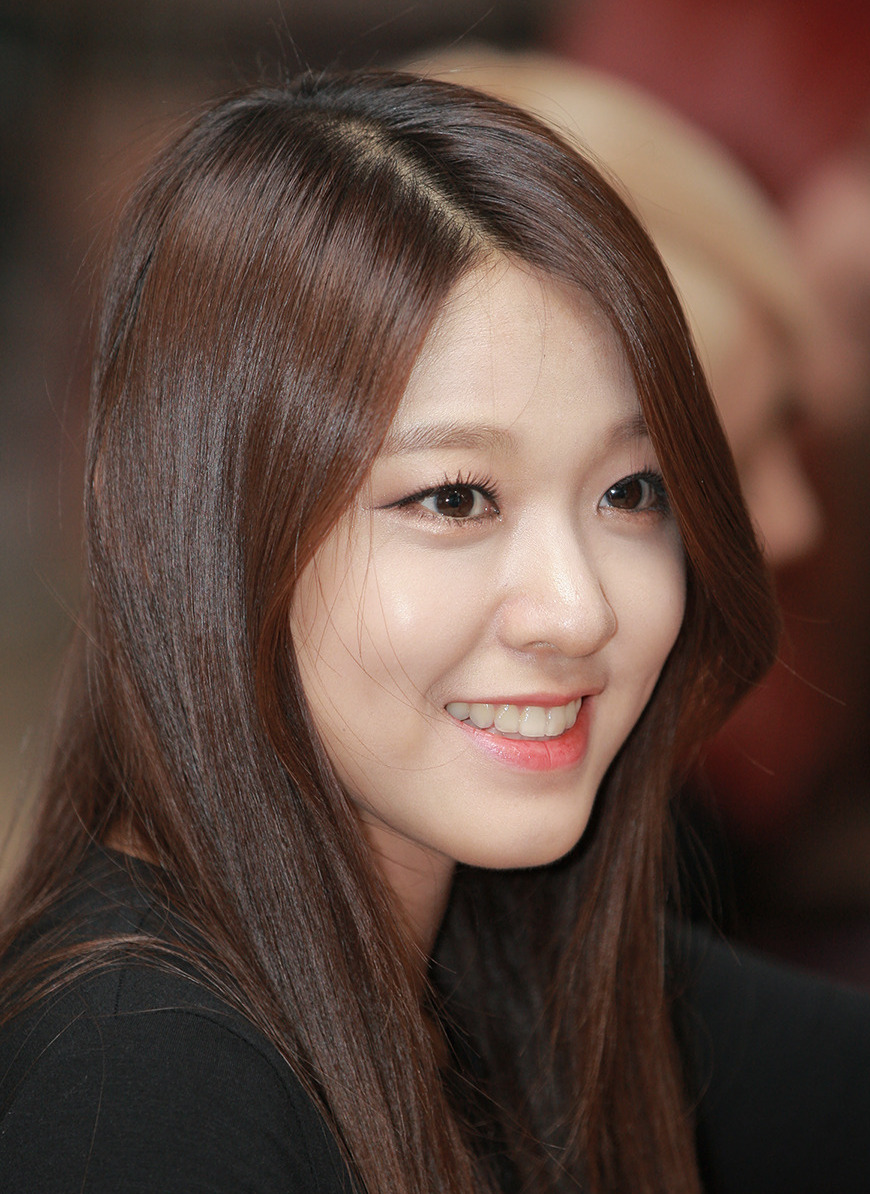
Kim Seol-hyun (picture in 2013) played the protagonist's love interest in the music video

On January 27, 2012, F.T. Island released a music video teaser for "Severely". The full music video was released on January 31, 2012, which starred lead vocalist Lee Hong-gi and AOA member Kim Seol-hyun, a trainee of FNC Music at the time, as his love interest. The music video begins with Lee in a church where he mourns the death of his love interest. After exiting the building, he returns to the past and is given a second chance at saving the woman's life at the cost of his own.

Beginning on February 2, 2012, F.T. Island initiated promotions for Grown-Up by performing "Severely" and "We Hope to Become Lovers" on Mnet's music television program M! Countdown. The band also performed the songs the following days on Korean Broadcasting System's (KBS) Music Bank, Munhwa Broadcasting Corporation's (MBC) Show! Music Core and SBS's Inkigayo. On February 9, "Severely" earned its first K-Chart win on M! Countdown. F.T. Island won a second time on February 23. They won JTBC's Music on Top on February 15, February 22, and February 29, the latter of which earned them a Triple Crown for their third consecutive win on the show. On February 26, the band won Inkigayo's Mutizen. F.T. Island's final promotional performance was held on Inkigayo on March 18, 2012.

== Chart performance ==
With one eligible charting day, "Severely" entered at number 76 on South Korea's national monthly Gaon Digital Chart for January. On the chart dated January 29 – February 4, 2012, it debuted at number four on the weekly Gaon Digital Chart, shifting 334,140 downloads and 827,392 streams within its first week of release. The song rose to its peak at number three the following week, where it remained for two consecutive frames before descending to number eight. For the month of February, the song ranked at number three. By the end of the year, "Severely" was the 24th most-downloaded song with 2,291,448 units and the 81st most-streamed song with 15,206,652 streams domestically. It ranked number 65 on the year-end Gaon Digital Chart.

On the Billboard Korea K-Pop Hot 100, "Severely" debuted at number 35. On its second week, the song rose to number four. It peaked at number three the following week, where it remained for two consecutive weeks before falling to number ten. On the year-end chart, "Severely" ranked at number 39.

== Chart history ==
=== Weekly charts ===
Chart (2012)	Peak position
Billboard Korea K-Pop Hot 100	3
Gaon Digital Chart	3
Gaon Mobile Chart	11
Gaon Noraebang Chart	1

=== Year-end charts ===
Chart (2012)	Peak position
Billboard Korea K-Pop Hot 100	39
Gaon Digital Chart	65
