= List of Inkigayo Chart winners (2014) =

Inkigayo Chart winners (2014)

The Inkigayo Chart is a music program record chart that gives an award to the best-performing single of the week in South Korea. The chart measured digital performance in domestic online music services (60%), social media via YouTube views (35%), and advanced viewer votes (5%), in its ranking methodology. The candidates for the number-one song of the week received additional points from live votes.

== Chart history ==
Key
	Triple Crown
	Highest score in 2014
—	No show was held

Episode	Date	Artist	Song	Points	Ref.
752	January 5	IU	"Friday"	8,228	
753	January 12	Girl's Day	"Something"	8,955	
754	January 19	TVXQ	"Something"	9,708	
755	January 26	B1A4	"Lonely"	9,294	
756	February 2	Girl's Day	"Something"	8,107	
757	February 9	AOA	"Miniskirt"	8,661	
758	February 16	B.A.P.	"1004 (Angel)"	7,584	
759	February 23	Soyou & Junggigo	"Some"	8,020	
760	March 2	Sunmi	"Full Moon"	8,421	
761	March 9	Girls' Generation	"Mr. Mr."	10,974	
762	March 16	2NE1	"Come Back Home"	9,398	
763	March 23	Girls' Generation	"Mr. Mr."	9,489	
764	March 30	4Minute	"Whatcha Doin' Today"	8,928	
765	April 6	Park Hyo-shin	"Wild Flower"	7,754	
766	April 13	Apink	"Mr. Chu"	10,578	
—	April 20	AKMU	"200%"	9,556	
—	April 27	AKMU	"200%"	9,181	
—	May 4	AKMU	"200%"	9,662	
—	May 11	High4 & IU	"Not Spring, Love, or Cherry Blossoms"	9,500	
767	May 18	Exo-K	"Overdose"	10,258	
768	May 25	Exo-K	"Overdose"	9,130	
769	June 1	Exo-K	"Overdose"	7,080	
770	June 8	VIXX	"Eternity"	6,456	
— (Note: 20th anniversary of SBS Dream Concert telecast.)	June 15	Taeyang	"Eyes, Nose, Lips"	9,665	
771	June 22	Taeyang	"Eyes, Nose, Lips"	9,199	
772	June 29	Beast	"Good Luck"	11,000	
773	July 6	Taeyang	"Eyes, Nose, Lips"	10,037	
774	July 13	Beast	"Good Luck"	8,037	
775	July 20	f(x)	"Red Light"	9,589	
776	July 27	Girl's Day	"Darling"	9,817	
777	August 3	Sistar	"Touch My Body"	9,576	
778	August 10	Sistar	"Touch My Body"	8,933	
779	August 17	Sistar	"Touch My Body"	9,585	
780	August 24	Winner	"Empty"	10,695	
781	August 31	Winner	"Empty"	7,398	
782	September 7	Sistar	"I Swear"	7,754	
783	September 14	Super Junior	"Mamacita"	8,208	
784	September 21	Super Junior	"Mamacita"	7,881	
—	September 28	Girls' Generation-TTS	"Holler"	9,687	
785	October 5	Ailee	"Don't Touch Me"	9,152	
786	October 12	Kim Dong-ryul	"How I Am"	9,682	
787	October 19	IU	"Sogyeokdong"	8,732	
788	October 26	VIXX	"Error"	8,756	
789	November 2	Beast	"12:30"	10,206	
790	November 9	Beast	"12:30"	10,277	
791	November 16	MC Mong	"Miss Me or Diss Me"	9,569	
792	November 23	Hi Suhyun	"I'm Different"	8,786	
793	November 30	GD X Taeyang	"Good Boy"	7,667	
794	December 7	Apink	"Luv"	8,710	
795	December 14	Apink	"Luv"	7,915	
—	December 21	2014 SBS Gayo Daejun			
796	December 28	Apink	"Luv"	8,382	
