= Music on Top =

- Title card
- Genre: Music, Entertainment
- Presented by: Yoon Doo-joon; Lee Hyun-woo
- Country of origin: South Korea
- Original language: Korean
- No. of episodes: 14

Production
- Production locations: Hoam Art Hall, Jung District, Seoul
- Running time: 80–105 minutes

Original release
- Network: JTBC
- Release: December 8, 2011 – March 14, 2012

Music on Top (Korean: 뮤직온탑) was a South Korean music program broadcast on pay television network JTBC between 2011 and 2012. Hosted by Yoon Doo-joon of Beast and actor Lee Hyun-woo, it aired live every Wednesday from Hoam Art Hall in Jung District, Seoul.

Following the demise of similar music shows, such as Channel A's K-Pop Con and Maeil Broadcasting Network's Show! K Music, that belonged to other small networks, the show was placed on an indefinite hiatus after its March 14, 2012 broadcast. News media attributed this to the show's inability to distinguish itself from the multitude of popular music programs being broadcast by other cable and terrestrial networks at the time, and its failure to improve its consistently low viewership.

== Broadcast ==
News of JTBC's then-upcoming new music show was first announced on November 24, 2011. Titled Music on Top, the first episode aired live from Hoam Art Hall in Jung District, Seoul on Thursday December 8 at 6:25PM KST, overlapping with the broadcast of cable TV network Mnet's music program M Countdown which aired at 6PM KST on the same day. This raised concerns from the media and industry personnel on whether the show would be able to actively compete with M Countdown for viewership, since both programs aired in the same time slot, and attract artists to appear on its broadcast instead of the more popular M Countdown.

After just two months of being on air, JTBC changed the broadcast day from Thursday to Wednesday at 6:40PM KST effective February 15, 2012. Multiple news outlets reported the reason for the change as the increasing difficulty in procuring more artists to appear on the show since most were choosing to attend M Countdown instead. JTBC denied this was the case.

On March 27, 2012, news media reported that the show was in the process of being cancelled after similar music programs—MBN's Show K Music and Channel A's K-POP Con had both premiered around the same time as Music on Top—on other small networks had been cancelled due to low ratings and recruitment issues. The speculation was fuelled by the removal of the show's title from the network's broadcast schedule following the March 14 episode. In response, JTBC stated that that week's broadcast had already been prepared, and while discussions were ongoing as to the show's continuation, nothing had been decided. Producer Kim Hyung-joong denied the show was being cancelled and stated that a two-week hiatus—during which time new ideas for the show would be prepared—had originally been planned due to JTBC's development of an internal broadcasting system, but was now being extended to four to six weeks since it overlapped with the elections broadcast slated for April 11. Kim additionally stated that the show would resume on either April 18 or in the first week of May. On April 3, JTBC removed the show's title from its broadcast schedule for April 4 without citing any particular reason for the removal. An official from the network reiterated that this was not an indication of cancellation, but rather a "rest" or "holiday" decided on internally by the company, and there were plans to resume broadcasting in the latter part of the year. No new episodes aired subsequent to the March 14 episode, making that the show's final broadcast.

== Hosts ==
Yoon Doo-joon of Beast and actor Lee Hyun-woo were announced as hosts on December 6, 2011. They co-hosted the show from December 8, 2011, to March 14, 2012. On occasion, guest hosts filled in for Yoon while he was away on tour with his band.

=== Guest MCs ===
- Bang Min-ah (January 13, 2012)
- G.NA (February 9–March 7, 2012)
- Lee Jae-jin (March 14, 2012)
- Choi Min-hwan (March 14, 2012)

== Chart system ==
Music On Top implemented a chart system that went into effect starting January 2012. It was the first music show to introduce real-time SNS voting during a live broadcast. Scoring was calculated by combining the following:

- Sound Sales (50%)
- Music Sales (10%)
- Audience Rating Survey (10%)
- Online Voting (15%)
- Advisory Panel Scores (5%)
- SNS Real-time Votes (10%)

== First-place winners ==
Key
—	No show was held

List of Music on Top first-place winners
Date	Artist	Song	Ref.
January 5	Trouble Maker	"Trouble Maker"	
January 12	IU	"You & I"	
January 19 (Note: JTBC rebroadcast day one of the 2012 Golden Disc Awards, which originally aired live on January 11, on this date.)	T-ara	"Lovey-Dovey"	
January 26	T-ara	"Lovey-Dovey"	
February 2	T-ara	"Lovey-Dovey"	
February 9	T-ara	"Lovey-Dovey"	
February 16	F.T. Island	"Severely"	
February 22	F.T. Island	"Severely"	
February 29	F.T. Island	"Severely"	
March 7	Miss A	"Touch"	
March 14	BigBang	"Blue"	
March 21	—N/a		
March 28	—N/a		

== Similar programs ==
- SBS Inkigayo
- KBS Music Bank
- MBC Show! Music Core
- Mnet M Countdown
- Arirang TV Pops in Seoul
- Arirang TV Simply K-Pop
- Arirang TV Show K-Pop
- JTBC Music Universe K-909
- MBC M Show Champion
- SBS M The Show
