= Inkigayo =

South Korean television program

- Logo used since June 2022
- Also known as: The Music Trend
- Hangul: SBS 인기가요
- Hanja: SBS 人氣歌謠
- RR: SBS Ingigayo
- MR: SBS Inkigayo
- IPA: [e̞sʰɯbi.e̞sʰɯ ink͈iɡa̠jo]
- Genre: Music
- Presented by: Shinyu (TWS); "EJ" Eui-joo (&TEAM); Yihyun (Baby Dont Cry)
- Country of origin: South Korea
- Original language: Korean
- No. of seasons: 13
- No. of episodes: 1,298

Production
- Production location: SBS Open Hall
- Running time: 70 minutes
- Production company: Prism Studios

Original release
- Network: Seoul Broadcasting System
- Release: December 15, 1991 – October 17, 1993; February 1, 1998 – present

Inkigayo (Korean: 인기가요; English title: The Music Trend, previously Popular Song) is a South Korean music program broadcast by SBS. It airs live every Sunday. The show features some of the latest and most popular artists who perform on stage. It is broadcast from the SBS Open Hall in Deungchon-dong, Gangseo District, Seoul.

== History ==
Inkigayo debuted as SBS Popular Song in 1991 as a chart show, but was canceled in fall 1993 because it was replaced by TV Gayo 20 (TV 가요20). It was later revived in 1998 with its original title and format. In 2003, the chart format was removed and was replaced by Take 7, where seven of the most popular artists from the week are featured and the most popular artist receives the award for Mutizen Song.

In spring 2007, the program changed from a recorded broadcast to a live broadcast in an effort to boost ratings, as well as changing the English name to The Music Trend. On November 2, 2008, the program moved from 3:20 pm to 4:10 pm Sunday afternoons, airing before Good Sunday, also to boost ratings. In spring 2010, the program expanded to 70 minutes, beginning at 3:50 pm every Sunday.

On July 10, 2012, SBS announced it was revamping the show and removing the Take 7 system and Mutizen Song award, explaining that "we believe that rather than the ranking system, the most important thing is the genre K-Pop being recognized worldwide. Therefore, we have decided to abolish the system after much discussion. There's really no meaning behind a ranking system. We have decided to undergo this change in hopes that viewers can just enjoy the music. There are a lot of K-Pop stars in the music industry that have talent. We wanted to break free from the repetitive system, in which artists release new songs and perform, so we plan on redesigning our system by having the concept of more special stages. For viewers to enjoy the music, we will have more collaboration stages and much more." The revamped show, without Take 7 and Mutizen Song award, began on July 15, 2012.

On March 3, 2013, the program announced the revival of the chart system with Inkigayo Chart. The new chart is a collaboration with the Music Industry Association of Korea's Gaon Chart, and began March 17, 2013.

== Hosts ==
Date	Host
SBS Popular Song (1991–1993)
December 15, 1991 – December 29, 1992	Seo Sae-won
May 2 – June 20, 1993	Bae Chul-su, Kim Hee-sun
SBS Popular Song (1998–2007)
March 1 – May 24, 1998	Kim Seung-hyun, Jun Ji-hyun
June 28 – November 29, 1998	Lee Dong-gun, Kim Gyu-ri
December 6, 1998 – April 16, 2000	Kim Jin, Kim So-yeon
April 23 – December 31, 2000	Ahn Jae-mo, Kim Min-hee
January 7 – March 9, 2001	Ahn Jae-mo, Son Tae-young
March 18 – July 29, 2001	Song Chang-hwan, So Yoo-jin
August 5, 2001 – January 13, 2002	Lee Jong-su, So Yoo-jin
January 20 – August 18, 2002	Kim Jae-won, Kim Jung-hwa
August 25, 2002 – February 2, 2003	Kim Jeong-hoon, Kim Jung-hwa
February 9 – August 24, 2003	Kangta, Yu-min
September 7, 2003 – October 24, 2004	Kim Dong-wan, Park Han-byul
October 31, 2004 – June 5, 2005	Kim Dong-wan, Han Ye-seul
June 12 – October 23, 2005	Andy, Park Hye-won
November 20, 2005 – April 16, 2006	Andy, Han Hyo-joo
April 23, 2006 – February 18, 2007	Andy, Ku Hye-sun
Inkigayo (The Music Trend) (2007–present)
February 25 – October 7, 2007	Kim Hee-chul, Jang Keun-suk
November 11, 2007 – May 4, 2008	Kim Hee-chul, Song Ji-hyo
May 11 – November 30, 2008	Eun Ji-won, Heo Yi-jae
December 7, 2008 – January 11, 2009	Eun Ji-won, Leeteuk, Han Seung-yeon
January 18, 2009 – July 19, 2009	Eun Ji-won, Yu Seul-ah, Lee Hong-gi
July 26, 2009 – January 24, 2010	Ha Yeon-joo, Taecyeon, Wooyoung
February 7 – July 11, 2010	Taecyeon, Wooyoung, Sulli
July 18, 2010 – March 13, 2011	Jung Yong-hwa, Sulli, Jo Kwon
March 20 – November 13, 2011	Jo Kwon, Sulli, Lee Gi-kwang, IU
November 20, 2011 – May 27, 2012	Goo Ha-ra, IU, Nicole
June 3 – August 19, 2012	Goo Ha-ra, Lee Jong-suk, Nicole
August 26 – December 2, 2012	IU, Lee Jong-suk
December 16, 2012 – July 28, 2013	IU, Hwang Kwang-hee, Lee Hyun-woo
August 4, 2013 – January 26, 2014	Hwang Kwang-hee, Lee Hyun-woo, Bang Min-ah
February 2 – November 9, 2014	Hwang Kwang-hee, Lee Yu-bi, Suho, Byun Baek-hyun
November 16 – December 14, 2014	Hwang Kwang-hee, Kim You-jung, Suho, Byun Baek-hyun
December 28, 2014 – April 5, 2015	Hwang Kwang-hee, Kim You-jung, Hong Jong-hyun
April 12, 2015 – August 30, 2015	Kim You-jung, Hong Jong-hyun, Jackson Wang
September 5, 2015	Kim You-jung, Jackson Wang
September 13, 2015 – April 3, 2016	Kim You-jung, Jackson Wang, Yook Sung-jae
April 10, 2016 – May 29, 2016	Jackson Wang, Yook Sung-jae
July 3, 2016 – January 22, 2017	Gong Seung-yeon, Jeongyeon, Kim Min-seok
February 5, 2017 – February 4, 2018	Park Jin-young, Kim Jisoo, Doyoung
February 18, 2018 – October 28, 2018	Mingyu, Jung Chae-yeon, Song Kang
November 11, 2018 – February 3, 2019	Mingyu, Jung Chae-yeon
February 17, 2019 – October 6, 2019	Mingyu, Shin Eun-soo
October 20, 2019 – February 28, 2021	Minhyuk, Jaehyun, Lee Na-eun
March 7, 2021 – March 27, 2022	Jihoon, Sungchan, An Yu-jin
April 3, 2022 – April 2, 2023	Roh Jeong-eui, Choi Yeon-jun, Seo Bum-june
April 9, 2023 – July 16, 2023	Choi Yeon-jun, Hyungwon, Kim Ji-eun
July 23, 2023 – April 14, 2024	Choi Yeon-jun, Woonhak, Park Ji-hu
April 28, 2024 – September 14, 2025	Moon Seong-hyun, Han Yu-jin, Leeseo
October 19, 2025 – December 7, 2025	Shinyu, EJ, Leeseo
January 2026 – present	Shinyu, EJ, Yihyun

== Segments ==
=== Super Rookie ===
Every week, a "rookie" artist or group performed live on stage. At the end of the month, a "Super Rookie" was chosen, through votes from the Inkigayo homepage, and was featured that month. This segment ended at the end of 2010.

List of Super Rookies

2008

- April – Peter (피터)
- May – Deb (뎁)
- June – NAVI
- July – H7
- August – TGUS
- September – 2AM
- October – Symmetry
- November – IU
- December – XING

2009

- January – ZY
- February – Achtung (악퉁)
- March – Maydoni (메이다니)
- April – JUMPER
- May – AJ
- June – Answer
- July – SOOLj (술제이)
- August – 4Minute
- September – Supreme Team
- October – B2Y
- November – SHU-I
- December – Beast

2010

- January – Jung Suk (정석)
- February – Shaun L (션엘)
- March – MIJI (미지)
- June – Kim Yeo-hee (김여희)
- July – Ari (아리)
- August – Teen Top
- September – Go Eun (고은)
- October – Bohemian (보헤미안)
- November – Bebe Mignon (베베미뇽)
- December – One Way

=== Digital Music Charts ===
Formerly known as Mobile Ranking, the Digital Music Charts takes into consideration the popularity of songs through downloads on mobile phones as well as downloads on music sites. Every week, it features five ranks with a special guest(s) to host the segment. This segment was abandoned mid-2009.

=== Campaign Songs ===
Throughout each episode, various artists are featured in campaign songs that raise awareness for certain topics or issues. Such campaigns include: safe driving, drinking milk, piracy, and various local events.

=== Take 7 ===
Take 7 is the representative segment of Inkigayo. Every week, seven of the most popular songs of that week are featured, where most artists will perform. At the end of the show, the Mutizen Song ("Mutizen" is a portmanteau of "music" and "netizen", symbolizing a song chosen by netizens) which is the most popular song of the week, receives the award. This has replaced the regular countdown charts format seen in most music programs and eliminates the need to rank artists. One song can receive the award a maximum of three times; the following week, it is removed from the Take 7 list. This system was abolished on July 10, 2012.

==== First Place winners ====
===== 1998 =====
List of First Place winners

February

- 1998.02.01 – Turbo – 회상 (December)
- 1998.02.08 – Turbo – 회상 (December)
- 1998.02.15 – Turbo – 회상 (December)
- 1998.02.22 – S.E.S. – I'm Your Girl

March

- 1998.03.01 – S.E.S. – I'm Your Girl
- 1998.03.08 – Park Jin-young – Honey
- 1998.03.15 – Park Jin-young – Honey
- 1998.03.22 – Shin Seung-hun – 지킬수 없는 약속 (A Promise I Can't Follow)
- 1998.03.29 – Shin Seung-hun – 지킬수 없는 약속 (A Promise I Can't Follow)

April

- 1998.04.05 – Shin Seung-hun – 지킬수 없는 약속 (A Promise I Can't Follow)
- 1998.04.12 – S.E.S. – Oh, My Love
- 1998.04.19 – Cool – 애상 (Sorrow)
- 1998.04.26 – Cool – 애상 (Sorrow)

May

- 1998.05.03 – Cool – 애상 (Sorrow)
- 1998.05.10 – Cool – 애상 (Sorrow)
- 1998.05.17 – Im Chang-jung – 별이 되어 (Be A Star)
- 1998.05.24 – Im Chang-jung – 별이 되어 (Be A Star)
- 1998.05.31 – No Show

June

- 1998.06.07 – Yoo Seung-jun – 나나나 (Na Na Na)
- 1998.06.14 – Yoo Seung-jun – 나나나 (Na Na Na)
- 1998.06.21 – Yoo Seung-jun – 나나나 (Na Na Na)
- 1998.06.28 – Yoo Seung-jun – 나나나 (Na Na Na)

July

- 1998.07.05 – Diva – 왜 불러 (Why Do U Call Me)
- 1998.07.12 – Kim Min-jong – 착한 사랑 (Sincere Love)
- 1998.07.19 – Kim Min-jong – 착한 사랑 (Sincere Love)
- 1998.07.26 – Kim Min-jong – 착한 사랑 (Sincere Love)

August

- 1998.08.02 – Kim Min-jong – 착한 사랑 (Sincere Love)
- 1998.08.09 – Kim Hyun-jung – 그녀와의 이별 (Breakup With Her)
- 1998.08.16 – Kim Hyun-jung – 그녀와의 이별 (Breakup With Her)
- 1998.08.23 – Sechs Kies – Road Fighter
- 1998.08.30 – Sechs Kies – Road Fighter

September

- 1998.09.06 – Fin.K.L – 내 남자친구에게 (To My Boyfriend)
- 1998.09.13 – Fin.K.L – 내 남자친구에게 (To My Boyfriend)
- 1998.09.20 – Uhm Jung-hwa – 포이즌 (Poison)
- 1998.09.27 – Sechs Kies – 무모한 사랑 (Reckless Love)

October

- 1998.10.04 – Uhm Jung-hwa – 포이즌 (Poison)
- 1998.10.11 – Sechs Kies – 무모한 사랑 (Reckless Love)
- 1998.10.18 – H.O.T. – 열맞춰 (Line Up)
- 1998.10.25 – No Show

November

- 1998.11.01 – No Show
- 1998.11.08 – H.O.T. – 열맞춰 (Line Up)
- 1998.11.15 – Fin.K.L – 루비 (Ruby)
- 1998.11.22 – Turbo – 애인이 생겼어요 (I Got a Girlfriend)
- 1998.11.29 – H.O.T. – 빛 (Hope)

December

- 1998.12.06 – H.O.T. – 빛 (Hope)
- 1998.12.13 – H.O.T. – 빛 (Hope)
- 1998.12.20 – Sechs Kies – 커플 (Couple)
- 1998.12.27 – No Show

===== 1999 =====
List of First Place winners

January

- 1999.01.03 – Sechs Kies – 커플 (Couple)
- 1999.01.10 – S.E.S. – Dreams Come True
- 1999.01.17 – Turbo – X
- 1999.01.24 – 1TYM – 1TYM
- 1999.01.31 – S.E.S. – 너를 사랑해 (I Love You)

February

- 1999.02.07 – 1TYM – 1TYM
- 1999.02.14 – 1TYM – 1TYM
- 1999.02.21 – No Show
- 1999.02.28 – S.E.S. – 너를 사랑해 (I Love You)

March

- 1999.03.07 – S.E.S. – 너를 사랑해 (I Love You)
- 1999.03.14 – Cool – Misery
- 1999.03.21 – Roo'ra – 기도 (Good)
- 1999.03.28 – Roo'ra – 기도 (Good)

April

- 1999.04.04 – Roo'ra – 기도 (Good)
- 1999.04.11 – Kim Hyun-jung – 되돌아온 이별 (Separation Can Come Back)
- 1999.04.18 – Kim Hyun-jung – 되돌아온 이별 (Separation Can Come Back)
- 1999.04.25 – Kim Min-jong – 비원 (One's Earnest Prayer)

May

- 1999.05.02 – Im Chang-jung – Love Affair
- 1999.05.09 – Yoo Seung-jun – 열정 (Passion)
- 1999.05.16 – Yoo Seung-jun – 열정 (Passion)
- 1999.05.23 – No Show
- 1999.05.30 – Yoo Seung-jun – 열정 (Passion)

June

- 1999.06.06 – No Show
- 1999.06.13 – Fin.K.L – 영원한 사랑 (Forever Love)
- 1999.06.20 – Fin.K.L – 영원한 사랑 (Forever Love)
- 1999.06.27 – Fin.K.L – 영원한 사랑 (Forever Love)

July

- 1999.07.04 – Shinhwa – T.O.P
- 1999.07.11 – Yoo Seung-jun – 슬픈 침묵 (Sad Silence)
- 1999.07.18 – Shinhwa – T.O.P
- 1999.07.25 – Uhm Jung-hwa – 몰라 (I Don't Know)

August

- 1999.08.01 – Fin.K.L –자존심 (Pride)
- 1999.08.08 – Country Kko Kko – 일심 (One Heart)
- 1999.08.15 – Shinhwa – Yo!
- 1999.08.22 – Shinhwa – Yo!
- 1999.08.29 – Baby V.O.X. – Get Up
- 1999.08.29 – Lolly (singer) – Viva La Radio

September

- 1999.09.05 – Park Ji-yoon – 가버려 (Go Away)
- 1999.09.12 – Sechs Kies – Com' Back
- 1999.09.19 – Sechs Kies – Com' Back
- 1999.09.26 – Sechs Kies – Com' Back

October

- 1999.10.03 – H.O.T. – 아이야 (I Yah)
- 1999.10.10 – H.O.T. – 아이야 (I Yah)
- 1999.10.17 – No Show
- 1999.10.24 – H.O.T. – 아이야 (I Yah)
- 1999.10.31 – Baby V.O.X. – Killer

November

- 1999.11.07 – Sechs Kies – 예감 (Premonition)
- 1999.11.14 – Jo Sung-mo – For Your Soul
- 1999.11.21 – Sechs Kies – 예감 (Premonition)
- 1999.11.28 – Lee Jung-hyun – 와 (Wa)

December

- 1999.12.05 – Lee Jung-hyun – 와 (Wa)
- 1999.12.12 – Fin.K.L – To My Prince
- 1999.12.19 – Yoo Seung-jun – 비전 (Vision)
- 1999.12.26 – Yoo Seung-jun – 비전 (Vision)

===== 2000 =====
List of First Place winners

January

- 2000.01.02 – Yoo Seung-jun – 비전 (Vision)
- 2000.01.09 – g.o.d – 사랑해 그리고 기억해 (Love and Memory)
- 2000.01.16 – Lee Jung-hyun – 바꿔 (Change)
- 2000.01.23 – S.E.S. – Twilight Zone
- 2000.01.30 – SKY – 영원 (Forever)

February

- 2000.02.06 – No Show
- 2000.02.13 – Yoo Seung-jun – 연가 (Love Song)
- 2000.02.20 – Yoo Seung-jun – 연가 (Love Song)
- 2000.02.27 – Jo Sung-mo – 가시나무 (Thorn Tree)

March

- 2000.03.05 – g.o.d – 애수 (Sorrow)
- 2000.03.12 – g.o.d – 애수 (Sorrow)
- 2000.03.19 – g.o.d – 애수 (Sorrow)
- 2000.03.26 – Im Chang-jung – 나의 연인 (My Lover)

April

- 2000.04.02 – Im Chang-jung – 나의 연인 (My Lover)
- 2000.04.09 – g.o.d – Friday Night
- 2000.04.16 – g.o.d – Friday Night
- 2000.04.23 – g.o.d – Friday Night
- 2000.04.30 – Chakra – 한 (Hate)

May

- 2000.05.07 – Kim Min-jong – 왜 (Why)
- 2000.05.14 – Kim Min-jong – 왜 (Why)
- 2000.05.21 – Kim Min-jong – 왜 (Why)
- 2000.05.28 – No Show

June

- 2000.06.04 – 1TYM – One Love
- 2000.06.11 – Baek Ji-young – Dash
- 2000.06.18 – Baek Ji-young – Dash
- 2000.06.25 – J – 어제처럼 (Like Yesterday)

July

- 2000.07.02 – Kim Hyun-jung – 멍 (Bruise)
- 2000.07.09 – Shinhwa – Only One
- 2000.07.16 – Shinhwa – Only One
- 2000.07.23 – Country Kko Kko – 오! 가니 (Oh! Do You Leave Me?)
- 2000.07.30 – Country Kko Kko – 오! 가니 (Oh! Do You Leave Me?)

August

- 2000.08.06 – Lee Jung-hyun – 너 (You)
- 2000.08.13 – Lee Jung-hyun – 너 (You)
- 2000.08.20 – Baek Ji-young – Sad Salsa
- 2000.08.27 – Shinhwa – All Your Dreams

September

- 2000.09.03 – Hong Kyung-min – 흔들린 우정 (Broken Friendship)
- 2000.09.10 – Hong Kyung-min – 흔들린 우정 (Broken Friendship)
- 2000.09.17 – No Show
- 2000.09.24 – Jo Sung-mo – 아시나요 (Do You Know)

October

- 2000.10.01 – No Show
- 2000.10.08 – Jo Sung-mo – 아시나요 (Do You Know)
- 2000.10.15 – Jo Sung-mo – 아시나요 (Do You Know)
- 2000.10.22 – H.O.T. – Outside Castle
- 2000.10.29 – H.O.T. – Outside Castle

November

- 2000.11.05 – H.O.T. – Outside Castle
- 2000.11.12 – Fin.K.L – Now
- 2000.11.19 – Fin.K.L – Now
- 2000.11.26 – Fin.K.L – Now

December

- 2000.12.03 – g.o.d – 거짓말 (Lies)
- 2000.12.10 – g.o.d. – 거짓말 (Lies)
- 2000.12.17 – g.o.d. – 거짓말 (Lies)
- 2000.12.24 – Yoo Seung-jun – 찾길 바래 (I'll Be Back)
- 2000.12.31 – No Show

===== 2001 =====
List of First Place winners

January

- 2001.01.07 – Yoo Seung-jun – 찾길 바래 (I'll Be Back)
- 2001.01.14 – Yoo Seung-jun – 찾길 바래 (I'll Be Back)
- 2001.01.21 – Im Chang-jung – 날 닮은 너 (You're Like Me)
- 2001.01.28 – Im Chang-jung – 날 닮은 너 (You're Like Me)

February

- 2001.02.04 – g.o.d – 니가 필요해 (I Need You)
- 2001.02.11 – g.o.d – 니가 필요해 (I Need You)
- 2001.02.18 – S.E.S. – 감싸 안으며 (Show Me Your Love)
- 2001.02.25 – S.E.S. – 감싸 안으며 (Show Me Your Love)

March

- 2001.03.04 – Position – I Love You
- 2001.03.11 – Position – I Love You
- 2001.03.18 – Position – I Love You
- 2001.03.25 – Lee Ji-hoon – 인형 (Doll)

April

- 2001.04.01 – Cha Tae-hyun – I Love You
- 2001.04.08 – Jinusean – A-Yo
- 2001.04.15 – S♯arp – Sweety
- 2001.04.22 – S♯arp – Sweety
- 2001.04.29 – Chakra – 끝 (End)

May

- 2001.05.06 – Psy – 새 (Bird)
- 2001.05.13 – Fin.K.L – 당신은 모르실거야 (You'll Never Know)
- 2001.05.20 – No Show
- 2001.05.27 – Fin.K.L – 당신은 모르실거야 (You'll Never Know)

June

- 2001.06.03 – Drunken Tiger – Good Life
- 2001.06.10 – Drunken Tiger – Good Life
- 2001.06.17 – Click-B – 백전무패 (Undefeatable)
- 2001.06.24 – Psy – 끝 (End)

July

- 2001.07.01 – S♯arp – 백일기도 (100 Days Prayer)
- 2001.07.08 – Kim Gun-mo – 짱가
- 2001.07.15 – Kim Gun-mo – 짱가
- 2001.07.22 – Kim Gun-mo – 짱가
- 2001.07.29 – MC the Max – 사랑하니까 (Because Of Love)

August

- 2001.08.05 – Park Jin-young – 난 여자가 있는데 (I Have A Woman)
- 2001.08.12 – Cool – Jumpo Mambo
- 2001.08.19 – Cool – Jumpo Mambo
- 2001.08.26 – UN – 파도 (Ocean Wave)

September

- 2001.09.02 – S.E.S. – 꿈을 모아서 (Just In Love)
- 2001.09.09 – Shinhwa – Hey, Come On
- 2001.09.16 – Shinhwa – Hey, Come On
- 2001.09.23 – Im Chang-jung – 기다리는 이유 (Reason to Wait)
- 2001.09.30 – Im Chang-jung – 기다리는 이유 (Reason to Wait)

October

- 2001.10.07 – Yoo Seung-jun – Wow
- 2001.10.14 – Yoo Seung-jun – Wow
- 2001.10.21 – Yoo Seung-jun – Wow
- 2001.10.28 – Wax – 화장을 고치고 (Redoing My Makeup)

November

- 2001.11.04 – Lee Ki-chan – 또 한번 사랑은 가고 (Love Has Left Again)
- 2001.11.11 – Lee Ki-chan – 또 한번 사랑은 가고 (Love Has Left Again)
- 2001.11.18 – UN – 선물 (Gift)
- 2001.11.25 – Kim Min-jong – You're My Life

December

- 2001.12.02 – Jang Na-ra – 고백 (Confession)
- 2001.12.09 – g.o.d – 길 (Road)
- 2001.12.16 – g.o.d – 길 (Road)
- 2001.12.23 – g.o.d – 길 (Road)
- 2001.12.30 – No Show

===== 2002 =====
List of First Place winners

January

- 2002.01.06 – T (Yoon Mi-rae) – 시간이 흐른 뒤 (As Time Goes By)
- 2002.01.13 – S#arp – 내입술... 따뜻한 커피처럼 (My Lips... Warm Like Coffee)
- 2002.01.20 – Jang Na-ra – 4월 이야기 (April Story)
- 2002.01.27 – g.o.d – 니가 있어야 할 곳 (Place Where You Need To Be)

February

- 2002.02.03 – g.o.d – 니가 있어야 할 곳 (Place Where You Need To Be)
- 2002.02.10 – g.o.d – 니가 있어야 할 곳 (Place Where You Need To Be)
- 2002.02.17 – jtL – A Better Day
- 2002.02.24 – jtL – A Better Day

March

- 2002.03.03 – jtL – A Better Day
- 2002.03.10 – S.E.S. – U
- 2002.03.17 – S.E.S. – U
- 2002.03.24 – S.E.S. – U
- 2002.03.31 – Fin.K.L – 영원 (Forever)

April

- 2002.04.07 – Fin.K.L – 영원 (Forever)
- 2002.04.14 – Fin.K.L – 영원 (Forever)
- 2002.04.21 – Shinhwa – Perfect Man
- 2002.04.28 – Shinhwa – Perfect Man

May

- 2002.05.05 – Shinhwa – Perfect Man
- 2002.05.12 – BoA – No. 1
- 2002.05.19 – BoA – No. 1
- 2002.05.26 – BoA – No. 1

June

- 2002.06.02 – Country Kko Kko – Conga
- 2002.06.09 – Baby V.O.X. – 우연 (By Chance)
- 2002.06.16 – Baby V.O.X. – 우연 (By Chance)
- 2002.06.23 – Im Chang-jung – 슬픈 혼잣말 (Sad Monologue)
- 2002.06.30 – Im Chang-jung – 슬픈 혼잣말 (Sad Monologue)

July

- 2002.07.07 – Im Chang-jung – 슬픈 혼잣말 (Sad Monologue)
- 2002.07.14 – Fly to the Sky – Sea Of Love
- 2002.07.21 – Fly to the Sky – Sea Of Love
- 2002.07.28 – Wheesung – 안되나요 (Can't You, Please)

August

- 2002.08.04 – Wheesung – 안되나요 (Can't You, Please)
- 2002.08.11 – Cool – 진실 (Truth)
- 2002.08.18 – Cool – 진실 (Truth)
- 2002.08.25 – Sung Si-kyung – 우린 제법 잘 어울려요 (We're A Well-Assorted Couple)

September

- 2002.09.01 – Moon Hee-joon – 아낌없이 주는 나무 (Generous...)
- 2002.09.08 – Wax – 부탁해요 (A Request From You)
- 2002.09.15 – Wax – 부탁해요 (A Request From You)
- 2002.09.22 – No Show
- 2002.09.29 – Kim Hyun-jung – 단칼 (Show Revolution)

October

- 2002.10.06 – Rain – 안녕이란 말 대신 (Instead of Saying Goodbye)
- 2002.10.13 – Kangta – 사랑은 기억보다 (Memories)
- 2002.10.20 – Lee Soo-young – 라라라 (La La La)
- 2002.10.27 – No Show

November

- 2002.11.03 – Jang Na-ra – Sweet Dream
- 2002.11.10 – BoA – Valenti
- 2002.11.17 – Park Hyo-shin – 좋은 사람 (Good Person)
- 2002.11.24 – Park Hyo-shin – 좋은 사람 (Good Person)

December

- 2002.12.01 – Psy – 챔피언 (Champion)
- 2002.12.08 – YG Family – 멋쟁이 신사 (Turn It Up)
- 2002.12.15 – UN – Miracle
- 2002.12.22 – UN – Miracle
- 2002.12.29 – No Show

===== 2003 =====
List of First Place winners

January

- 2003.01.05 – Lee Ki-chan – 감기 (A Cold)
- 2003.01.12 – Boohwal – Never Ending Story
- 2003.01.19 – Boohwal – Never Ending Story
- 2003.01.26 – Jang Na-ra – Snow Man

==== Mutizen Song winners ====
===== 2003 =====
List of Mutizen Songs

February

- 2003.02.02 – No Show
- 2003.02.09 – Shinhwa – 너의 결혼식 (Your Wedding)
- 2003.02.16 – Shinhwa – 너의 결혼식 (Your Wedding)
- 2003.02.23 – No Show

March

- 2003.03.02 – g.o.d – 0%
- 2003.03.09 – Lee Soo-young – Good-bye
- 2003.03.16 – Click-B – Cowboy
- 2003.03.23 – NRG – Hit song
- 2003.03.30 – Park Ji-yoon – DJ

April

- 2003.04.06 – Kim Gun-mo – My son
- 2003.04.13 – NRG – Hit song
- 2003.04.20 – Jo Sung-mo – 피아노 (Piano)
- 2003.04.27 – Ahn Jae-wook – 친구 (Friend)

May

- 2003.05.04 – SE7EN – 와줘 (Come Back to Me)
- 2003.05.11 – SE7EN – 와줘 (Come Back to Me)
- 2003.05.18 – No Show
- 2003.05.25 – No Show

June

- 2003.06.01 – Baby V.O.X. – 나 어떡해 (What Should I Do)
- 2003.06.08 – Cha Tae-hyun – Again to me
- 2003.06.15 – Cha Tae-hyun – Again to me
- 2003.06.22 – BoA – 아틀란티스 소녀 (Atlantis Princess)
- 2003.06.29 – Koyote – 비상 (Emergency)

July

- 2003.07.06 – BoA – 아틀란티스 소녀 (Atlantis Princess)
- 2003.07.13 – BoA – 아틀란티스 소녀 (Atlantis Princess)
- 2003.07.20 – Im Chang-jung – 소주한잔 (A Glass of Soju)
- 2003.07.27 – No Show

August

- 2003.08.03 – Cool – 결혼을 할거라면 (If You Will Get Married)
- 2003.08.10 – Cool – 결혼을 할거라면 (If You Will Get Married)
- 2003.08.17 – Cool – 결혼을 할거라면 (If You Will Get Married)
- 2003.08.24 – Fly to the Sky – Missing you
- 2003.08.31 – Fly to the Sky – Missing you

September

- 2003.09.07 – Lee Hyori – 10 Minutes
- 2003.09.14 – Lee Hyori – 10 Minutes
- 2003.09.21 – Lee Hyori – 10 Minutes
- 2003.09.28 – jtL – Without your love

October

- 2003.10.05 – Wheesung – With me
- 2003.10.12 – Wheesung – With me
- 2003.10.19 – S – I Swear
- 2003.10.26 – S – I Swear

November

- 2003.11.02 – S – I Swear
- 2003.11.09 – Rain – 태양을 피하는 방법 (Ways to Avoid the Sun)
- 2003.11.16 – No Show
- 2003.11.23 – Rain – 태양을 피하는 방법 (Ways to Avoid the Sun)
- 2003.11.30 – Rain – 태양을 피하는 방법 (Ways to Avoid the Sun)

December

- 2003.12.07 – Wheesung – 다시 만난 날 (The Day We Meet Again)
- 2003.12.14 – Lexy – 애송이 (Greenhorn)
- 2003.12.21 – Lexy – 애송이 (Greenhorn)
- 2003.12.28 – Sung Si-kyung – 차마 (Endure)

===== 2004 =====
List of Mutizen Songs

January

- 2004.01.04 – Jang Na-ra – 기도 (Pray)
- 2004.01.11 – Jang Na-ra – 기도 (Pray)
- 2004.01.18 – M.C. the MAX – 사랑의시 (Love's Poem)
- 2004.01.25 – M.C. the MAX – 사랑의시 (Love's Poem)

February

- 2004.02.01 – 1TYM – HOT 뜨거 (HOT)
- 2004.02.08 – 1TYM – HOT 뜨거 (HOT)
- 2004.02.15 – M.C. the MAX – 사랑의시 (Love's Poem)
- 2004.02.22 – 1TYM – HOT 뜨거 (HOT)
- 2004.02.29 – Tei – 사랑은 향기를 남기고 (Love Leaves A Scent)

March

- 2004.03.07 – Tei – 사랑은 향기를 남기고 (Love Leaves A Scent)
- 2004.03.14 – Tei – 사랑은 향기를 남기고 (Love Leaves A Scent)
- 2004.03.21 – M.C. the MAX – 그대는 눈물겹다 (When the Tears Lay)
- 2004.03.28 – TVXQ – Hug

April

- 2004.04.04 – TVXQ – Hug
- 2004.04.11 – TVXQ – Hug
- 2004.04.18 – Koyote – 디스코왕 (Disco King)
- 2004.04.25 – SG Wannabe – Timeless

May

- 2004.05.02 – Koyote – 디스코왕 (Disco King)
- 2004.05.09 – Cho PD – 친구여 (My Friend)
- 2004.05.16 – Koyote – 디스코왕 (Disco King)
- 2004.05.23 – Cho PD – 친구여 (My Friend)
- 2004.05.30 – MC Mong – 180도 (180 Degrees)

June

- 2004.06.06 – No Show
- 2004.06.13 – No Show
- 2004.06.20 – MC Mong – 180도 (180 Degrees)
- 2004.06.27 – Koyote – 불꽃 (Fireworks)

July

- 2004.07.04 – BoA – My Name
- 2004.07.11 – BoA – My Name
- 2004.07.18 – BoA – My Name
- 2004.07.25 – Tim – 고마웠다고... (I Said Thanks...)

August

- 2004.08.01 – Lyn – 사랑했잖아 (Used To Love)
- 2004.08.08 – SE7EN – 열정 (Passion)
- 2004.08.15 – SE7EN – 열정 (Passion)
- 2004.08.22 – Lee Seung-gi – 내여자라니까 (Because You're My Girl)
- 2004.08.29 – SE7EN – 열정 (Passion)

September

- 2004.09.05 – TVXQ – The Way U Are
- 2004.09.12 – BoA – Spark
- 2004.09.19 – BoA – Spark
- 2004.09.26 – Kim Jong-kook – 한남자 (One Man)

October

- 2004.10.03 – Kim Jong-kook – 한남자 (One Man)
- 2004.10.10 – Shinhwa – Brand New
- 2004.10.17 – Shinhwa – Brand New
- 2004.10.24 – No Show
- 2004.10.31 – Gummy – 기억상실 (Loss of Memory)

November

- 2004.11.07 – Rain – It's Raining
- 2004.11.14 – No Show
- 2004.11.21 – Rain – It's Raining
- 2004.11.28 – Rain – It's Raining

December

- 2004.12.05 – TVXQ – 믿어요 (I Believe)
- 2004.12.12 – Shinhwa – 열병 (Crazy)
- 2004.12.19 – Shinhwa – 열병 (Crazy)
- 2004.12.26 – Rain – I Do

===== 2005 =====
List of Mutizen Songs

January

- 2005.01.02 – TVXQ – Tri-Angle
- 2005.01.09 – g.o.d – 보통날 (An Ordinary Day)
- 2005.01.16 – g.o.d – 보통날 (An Ordinary Day)
- 2005.01.23 – M.C. the MAX – 행복하지 말아요 (Don't Say You're Happy)
- 2005.01.30 – g.o.d – 반대가 끌리는 이유 (The Reason Why Opposites Attract)

February

- 2005.02.06 – g.o.d – 반대가 끌리는 이유 (The Reason Why Opposites Attract)
- 2005.02.13 – g.o.d – 반대가 끌리는 이유 (The Reason Why Opposites Attract)
- 2005.02.20 – Tei – 사랑은 하나다 (Love Is... only one)
- 2005.02.27 – Tei – 사랑은 하나다 (Love Is... only one)

March

- 2005.03.06 – Tei – 사랑은 하나다 (Love Is... only one)
- 2005.03.13 – M.C. the MAX – 이별이라는 이름 (A Name Called Leave)
- 2005.03.20 – Jo Sung-mo – Mr.Flower
- 2005.03.27 – Buzz – 겁쟁이 (Coward)

April

- 2005.04.03 – Jo Sung-mo – Mr.Flower
- 2005.04.10 – Jo Sung-mo – Mr.Flower
- 2005.04.17 – Buzz – 겁쟁이 (Coward)
- 2005.04.24 – Buzz – 겁쟁이 (Coward)

May

- 2005.05.01 – Jewelry – Superstar
- 2005.05.08 – Jewelry – Superstar
- 2005.05.15 – SG Wannabe – 죄와벌 (Sin & Punishment)
- 2005.05.22 – SG Wannabe – 죄와벌 (Sin & Punishment)
- 2005.05.29 – Sung Si-kyung – 잘지내나요 (Take Care)

June

- 2005.06.05 – Shin Hye-sung – 같은생각 (Same Thought)
- 2005.06.12 – Shin Hye-sung – 같은생각 (Same Thought)
- 2005.06.19 – MC Mong – 천하무적 (Invincible)
- 2005.06.26 – Yoon Do-hyun – 사랑했나봐 (I Think I Loved You)

July

- 2005.07.03 – MC Mong –천하무적 (Invincible)
- 2005.07.10 – No Show
- 2005.07.17 – BoA – Girls On Top
- 2005.07.24 – BoA – Girls On Top
- 2005.07.31 – BoA – Girls On Top

August

- 2005.08.07 – Kim Jong-kook – 제자리걸음 (Walking in the Same Place)
- 2005.08.14 – Kim Jong-kook – 제자리걸음 (Walking in the Same Place)
- 2005.08.21 – Kim Jong-kook – 제자리걸음 (Walking in the Same Place)
- 2005.08.28 – MC Mong – I Love U Oh Thank U

September

- 2005.09.04 – MC Mong – I Love U Oh Thank U
- 2005.09.11 – Kim Jong-kook – 사랑스러워 (Lovely)
- 2005.09.18 – No Show
- 2005.09.25 – Kim Jong-kook – 사랑스러워 (Lovely)

October

- 2005.10.02 – Kim Jong-kook – 사랑스러워 (Lovely)
- 2005.10.09 – TVXQ – Rising Sun
- 2005.10.16 – TVXQ – Rising Sun
- 2005.10.23 – TVXQ – Rising Sun
- 2005.10.30 – Wheesung – Good bye luv

November

- 2005.11.06 – Wheesung – Good bye luv
- 2005.11.13 – No Show
- 2005.11.20 – Lee Min-woo – Girl Friend
- 2005.11.27 – Epik High – Fly

December

- 2005.12.04 – g.o.d – 2♡
- 2005.12.11 – Wheesung – 일년이면 (A Year Gone)
- 2005.12.18 – LeeSsang – 내가 웃는게 아니야 (I'm Not Really Laughing)
- 2005.12.25 – LeeSsang – 내가 웃는게 아니야 (I'm Not Really Laughing)

===== 2006 =====
List of Mutizen Songs

January

- 2006.01.01 – No Show
- 2006.01.08 – Tei – 그리움을 외치다 (Screaming I miss you)
- 2006.01.15 – M.C. the MAX – 사랑은 아프려고 하는거죠 (Love is Supposed to Hurt)
- 2006.01.22 – M.C. the MAX – 사랑은 아프려고 하는거죠 (Love is Supposed to Hurt)
- 2006.01.29 – No Show

February

- 2006.02.05 – Fly to the Sky – 남자답게 (Like a Man)
- 2006.02.12 – Fly to the Sky – 남자답게 (Like a Man)
- 2006.02.19 – Fly to the Sky – 남자답게 (Like a Man)
- 2006.02.26 – Lee Soo-young – Grace

March

- 2006.03.05 – Lee Soo-young – Grace
- 2006.03.12 – Lee Hyori – Get Ya
- 2006.03.19 – Lee Hyori – Get Ya
- 2006.03.26 – No Show

April

- 2006.04.02 – Lee Seung-gi – 하기 힘든말 (Words are Hard to Say)
- 2006.04.09 – Fly to the Sky – 피(避) (Evasion)
- 2006.04.16 – SE7EN – 난 알아요 (I Know)
- 2006.04.23 – SeeYa – 여인의 향기 (A Woman's Scent)
- 2006.04.30 – SG Wannabe – 내사람 (Partner for Life)

May

- 2006.05.07 – SG Wannabe – 내사람 (Partner for Life)
- 2006.05.14 – SG Wannabe – 내사람 (Partner for Life)
- 2006.05.21 – Tony An – 유추프라카치아 (Yutzpracachia)
- 2006.05.28 – No Show

June

- 2006.06.04 – Baek Ji-young – 사랑안해 (Don't Love)
- 2006.06.11 – Shinhwa – Once in a Life Time
- 2006.06.18 – Shinhwa – Once in a Life Time
- 2006.06.25 – Super Junior – U

July

- 2006.07.02 – Buzz – 남자를 몰라 (Confusion About Men)
- 2006.07.09 – Super Junior – U
- 2006.07.16 – Super Junior – U
- 2006.07.23 – SG Wannabe – 사랑했어요 (I Loved You)
- 2006.07.30 – SG Wannabe – 사랑했어요 (I Loved You)

August

- 2006.08.06 – SG Wannabe – 사랑했어요 (I Loved You)
- 2006.08.13 – Psy– 연예인 (Entertainer)
- 2006.08.20 – Super Junior – Dancing Out
- 2006.08.27 – Turtles – 비행기 (Airplane)

September

- 2006.09.03 – Turtles – 비행기 (Airplane)
- 2006.09.10 – Psy – 연예인 (Entertainer)
- 2006.09.17 – Psy – 연예인 (Entertainer)
- 2006.09.24 – Zhang Liyin (feat. Xiah Junsu) – Timeless

October

- 2006.10.01 – Lee Seung-gi – 제발 (Please)
- 2006.10.08 – No Show
- 2006.10.15 – TVXQ – "O"–正.反.合. ("O" – Jung.Ban.Hap.)
- 2006.10.22 – No Show
- 2006.10.29 – TVXQ – "O"–正.反.合. ("O" – Jung.Ban.Hap.)

November

- 2006.11.05 – TVXQ – "O"–正.反.合. ("O" – Jung.Ban.Hap.)
- 2006.11.12 – Lee Hyori – 2 Faces
- 2006.11.19 – MC Mong – 아이스크림 (Ice Cream)
- 2006.11.26 – Eru – 까만안경 (Black Glasses)

December

- 2006.12.03 – Sung Si-kyung – 거리에서 (On The Street)
- 2006.12.10 – SE7EN – 라라라 (La La La)
- 2006.12.17 – Jun Jin – 사랑이 오지 않아요 (Love Doesn't Come)
- 2006.12.24 – Jang Woo-hyuk – 폭풍속으로 (One Way)
- 2006.12.31 – No Show

===== 2007 =====
List of Mutizen Songs

Key
	Triple Crown
—	No show was held
SE	A Special Episode was aired

Episode	Date	Artist	Song
423	January 7	SS501	"4 Chance"
424	January 14	Son Hoyoung	"Love Brings Separation"
425	January 21	Brian Joo	"Don't Go"
426	January 28	SS501	"4 Chance"
427	February 4	SS501	"4 Chance"
428	February 11	Eru	"White Snow"
—	February 18	Eun Ji-won	"Crazy For The Mic Since 1978"
429	February 25	Eru	"White Snow"
430	March 4	Epik High	"Fan"
431	March 11	Epik High	"Fan"
432	March 18	Lee Ki-chan	"Angel"
—	March 25		
433	April 1	Ivy	"Sonata of Temptation"
434	April 8	Ivy	"Sonata of Temptation"
—	April 15		
435	April 22	Ivy	"Sonata of Temptation"
436	April 29	SG Wannabe	"Arirang"
437	May 6	SG Wannabe	"Arirang"
438	May 13	SG Wannabe	"Arirang"
439	May 20	Younha	"Secret Number 486"
440	May 27	Ivy	"If You're Gonna Be Like This"
441	June 3	Younha	"Secret Number 486"
—	June 10		
442	June 17	The Grace	"One More Time, OK?"
443	June 24	Yangpa	"Love... What is it?"
444	July 1	Yangpa	"Love... What is it?"
445	July 8	Yangpa	"Love... What is it?"
446	July 15	SeeYa	"Love's Greeting"
447	July 22	Leessang	"Ballerino"
448	July 29	F.T. Island	"Love Sick"
449	August 5	F.T. Island	"Love Sick"
450	August 12	F.T. Island	"Love Sick"
451	August 19	Fly to the Sky	"My Angel"
452	August 26	Fly to the Sky	"My Angel"
453	September 2	Kim Dong-wan	"Handkerchief"
454	September 9	BigBang	"Lies"
455	September 16	Lee Seung-gi	"White Lie"
—	September 23		
456	September 30	Shin Hye-sung	"First Person"
457	October 7	Wheesung	"Love is Delicious♡"
—	October 14		
458	October 21	Super Junior	"Don't Don"
459	October 28	Wonder Girls	"Tell Me"
—	November 4		
460	November 11	Wonder Girls	"Tell Me"
461	November 18	Wonder Girls	"Tell Me"
462	November 25	Girls' Generation	"Girls' Generation"
463	December 2	Girls' Generation	"Girls' Generation"
464	December 9	Park Jin-young	"The House You Live In"
465	December 16	BigBang	"Last Farewell"
466	December 23	BigBang	"Last Farewell"
SE	December 30	Super Junior	"Missin' U"

===== 2008 =====
List of Mutizen Songs

Key
	Triple Crown
—	No show was held

Episode	Date	Artist	Song
467	January 6	F.T. Island	"Until You Return"
468	January 13	BigBang	"Last Farewell"
469	January 20	SeeYa	"Sad Footsteps"
470	January 27	Haha	"You Are My Destiny"
471	February 3	Girls' Generation	"Kissing You"
—	February 10	Andy Lee	"Love Song"
472	February 17	Girls' Generation	"Kissing You"
473	February 24	Park Ji Heon	"The Day I Miss You"
474	March 2	Brown Eyed Girls	"L.O.V.E."
475	March 9	Brown Eyed Girls	"L.O.V.E."
476	March 16	Jewelry	"One More Time"
477	March 23	Jewelry	"One More Time"
478	March 30	Jewelry	"One More Time"
479	April 6	Gummy y T.O.P	"I'm Sorry"
480	April 13	Gummy y T.O.P	"I'm Sorry"
481	April 20	SS501	"Deja Vu"
482	April 27	Nell	"Walking Through Memories"
483	May 4	Davichi	"Sad Promise"
484	May 11	Epik High	"One"
485	May 18	Epik High	"One"
486	May 25	MC Mong	"Circus"
487	June 1	SG Wannabe	"La La La"
—	June 8		
488	June 15	Wonder Girls	"So Hot"
489	June 22	Wonder Girls	"So Hot"
490	June 29	Wonder Girls	"So Hot"
491	July 6	Taeyang	"Only Look at Me"
492	July 13	Taeyang	"Only Look at Me"
493	July 20	Taeyang	"Only Look at Me"
494	July 27	Lee Hyori	"U-Go-Girl"
495	August 3	Lee Hyori	"U-Go-Girl"
496	August 10	Lee Hyori	"U-Go-Girl"
497	August 17	Davichi	"Love And War"
498	August 24	BigBang	"Haru Haru"
499	August 31	BigBang	"Haru Haru"
500	September 7	BigBang	"Haru Haru"
—	September 14		
501	September 21	Shinee	"Love Like Oxygen"
502	September 28	Lee Hyori	"Hey Mr. Big"
503	October 5	Lee Hyori	"Hey Mr. Big"
504	October 12	TVXQ	"Mirotic"
505	October 19	TVXQ	"Mirotic"
506	October 26	TVXQ	"Mirotic"
507	November 2	Rain	"Rainism"
—	November 9		
508	November 16	Kim Jong-kook	"Today More Than Yesterday"
509	November 23	Kim Jong-kook	"Today More Than Yesterday"
510	November 30	BigBang	"Sunset Glow"
511	December 7	BigBang	"Sunset Glow"
512	December 14	BigBang	"Sunset Glow"
513	December 21	Baek Ji-young	"Like Being Hit by a Bullet"
—	December 28		

===== 2009 =====
List of Mutizen Songs

Key
	Triple Crown
—	No show was held

Episode	Date	Artist	Song
—	January 4	Baek Ji-young	"Like Being Hit by a Bullet"
515	January 11	SS501	"U R Man"
516	January 18	Girls' Generation	"Gee"
—	January 25		
517	February 1	Girls' Generation	"Gee"
518	February 8	Girls' Generation	"Gee"
519	February 15	Seungri	"Strong Baby"
520	February 22	Seungri	"Strong Baby"
521	March 1	Seungri	"Strong Baby"
522	March 8	Kara	"Honey"
523	March 15	Davichi	"8282"
524	March 22	Davichi	"8282"
525	March 29	Super Junior	"Sorry, Sorry"
526	April 5	Super Junior	"Sorry, Sorry"
527	April 12	Super Junior	"Sorry, Sorry"
528	April 19	Son Dam-bi	"On Saturday Night"
529	April 26	Son Dam-bi	"On Saturday Night"
530	May 3	Son Dam-bi	"On Saturday Night"
531	May 10	2PM	"Again & Again"
532	May 17	2PM	"Again & Again"
—	May 24	2PM	"Again & Again"
533	May 31	SG Wannabe	"I Love You"
534	June 7	Super Junior	"It's You"
535	June 14	2NE1	"Fire"
536	June 21	2NE1	"Fire"
537	June 28	Shinee	"Juliette"
538	July 5	Shinee	"Juliette"
539	July 12	Girls' Generation	"Tell me Your Wish (Genie)"
540	July 19	Girls' Generation	"Tell me Your Wish (Genie)"
541	July 26	2NE1	"I Don't Care"
542	August 2	2NE1	"I Don't Care"
543	August 9	2NE1	"I Don't Care"
544	August 16	Brown Eyed Girls	"Abracadabra"
—	August 23	Brown Eyed Girls	"Abracadabra"
545	August 30	Kara	"Wanna"
546	September 6	G-Dragon	"Heartbreaker"
547	September 13	G-Dragon	"Heartbreaker"
548	September 20	G-Dragon	"Heartbreaker"
549	September 27	4Minute	"Muzik"
—	October 4	Lee Seung-gi	"Let's Break Up"
—	October 11	Lee Seung-gi	"Let's Break Up"
550	October 18	Kim Tae-woo	"Love Rain"
551	October 25	Kim Tae-woo	"Love Rain"
552	November 1	Shinee	"Ring Ding Dong"
553	November 8	Shinee	"Ring Ding Dong"
554	November 15	Shinee	"Ring Ding Dong"
—	November 22	SS501	"Love Like This"
555	November 29	2PM	"Heartbeat"
556	December 6	2PM	"Heartbeat"
557	December 13	2PM	"Heartbeat"
558	December 20	After School	"Because of You"
—	December 27	After School	"Because of You"

===== 2010 =====
List of Mutizen Songs

Key
	Triple Crown
—	No show was held

Episode	Date	Artist	Song
559	January 3	T-ara	"Bo Peep Bo Peep"
560	January 10	T-ara	"Bo Peep Bo Peep"
561	January 17	T-ara	"Bo Peep Bo Peep"
562	January 24	After School	"Because of You"
563	January 31	CNBLUE	"I'm a Loner"
564	February 7	2AM	"Can't Let You Go Even If I Die"
565	February 14	Girls' Generation	"Oh!"
566	February 21	Girls' Generation	"Oh!"
567	February 28	Girls' Generation	"Oh!"
568	March 7	2AM	"Can't Let Go Even If I Die"
569	March 14	Kara	"Lupin"
570	March 21	T-ara	"I Go Crazy Because of You"
—	March 28	T-ara	"I Go Crazy Because of You"
—	April 4	Girls' Generation	"Run Devil Run"
571	April 11	Girls' Generation	"Run Devil Run"
—	April 18	Rain	"Love Song"
—	April 25	Lee Hyori	"Chitty Chitty Bang Bang"
572	May 2	Lee Hyori	"Chitty Chitty Bang Bang"
573	May 9	Lee Hyori	"Chitty Chitty Bang Bang"
574	May 16	2PM	"Without U"
575	May 23	2PM	"Without U"
—	May 30	Super Junior	"Bonamana"
—	June 6	Super Junior	"Bonamana"
576	June 13	Super Junior	"Bonamana"
577	June 20	CNBLUE	"Love"
578	June 27	IU	"Nagging"
579	July 4	CNBLUE	"Love"
580	July 11	Super Junior	"No Other"
581	July 18	Taeyang	"I Need A Girl"
582	July 25	Taeyang	"I Need A Girl"
583	August 1	Miss A	"Bad Girl Good Girl"
584	August 8	Shinee	"Lucifer"
585	August 15	Shinee	"Lucifer"
586	August 22	BoA	"Hurricane Venus"
587	August 29	BoA	"Hurricane Venus"
588	September 5	F.T. Island	"Love Love Love"
589	September 12	F.T. Island	"Love Love Love"
—	September 19	2NE1	"Can't Nobody"
590	September 26	2NE1	"Can't Nobody"
591	October 3	2NE1	"Can't Nobody"
—	October 10	2NE1	"Go Away"
592	October 17	Shinee	"Hello"
593	October 24	2PM	"I'll Be Back"
594	October 31	Gain	"Irreversible"
595	November 7	Girls' Generation	"Hoot"
—	November 14	2AM	"You Wouldn't Answer My Calls"
597	November 21	Girls' Generation	"Hoot"
598	November 28	Girls' Generation	"Hoot"
599	December 5	Beast	"Beautiful"
600	December 12	Kara	"Jumping"
601	December 19	IU	"Good Day"
602	December 26	IU	"Good Day"

===== 2011 =====
List of Mutizen Songs

Key
	Triple Crown
—	No show was held

Episode	Date	Artist	Song
—	January 2	IU	"Good Day"
603	January 9	GD & TOP	"High High"
604	January 16	TVXQ	"Keep Your Head Down"
605	January 23	TVXQ	"Keep Your Head Down"
606	January 30	TVXQ	"Keep Your Head Down"
607	February 6	Seungri	"What Can I Do"
608	February 13	Seungri	"What Can I Do"
609	February 20	Secret	"Shy Boy"
610	February 27	G.NA	"Black & White"
611	March 6	BigBang	"Tonight"
612	March 13	BigBang	"Tonight"
613	March 20	BigBang	"Tonight"
614	March 27	TVXQ	"Before U Go"
615	April 3	K.Will	"My Heart Is Beating"
616	April 10	CNBLUE	"Intuition"
617	April 17	BigBang	"Love Song"
618	April 24	BigBang	"Love Song"
619	May 1	BigBang	"Love Song"
620	May 8	f(x)	"Pinocchio (Danger)"
621	May 15	f(x)	"Pinocchio (Danger)"
622	May 22	f(x)	"Pinocchio (Danger)"
623	May 29	2NE1	"Lonely"
624	June 5	Beast	"Fiction"
625	June 12	Beast	"Fiction"
626	June 19	Secret	"Starlight Moonlight"
627	June 26	f(x)	"Hot Summer"
628	July 3	2PM	"Hands Up"
629	July 10	2PM	"Hands Up"
630	July 17	2NE1	"I Am the Best"
631	July 24	T-ara	"Roly-Poly"
632	July 31	Miss A	"Good-bye Baby"
633	August 7	2NE1	"Ugly"
634	August 14	2NE1	"Ugly"
635	August 21	Super Junior	"Mr. Simple"
636	August 28	Super Junior	"Mr. Simple"
637	September 4	Super Junior	"Mr. Simple"
638	September 11	Sistar	"So Cool"
639	September 18	Davichi	"Don't Say Goodbye"
640	September 25	Kara	"Step"
641	October 2	Davichi	"Don't Say Goodbye"
642	October 9	Infinite	"Paradise"
643	October 16	Brown Eyed Girls	"Sixth Sense"
644	October 23	Brown Eyed Girls	"Sixth Sense"
645	October 30	Girls' Generation	"The Boys"
646	November 6	Girls' Generation	"The Boys"
647	November 13	Girls' Generation	"The Boys"
648	November 20	Lee Seung-gi	"Aren't We Friends"
649	November 27	Wonder Girls	"Be My Baby"
650	December 4	Wonder Girls	"Be My Baby"
651	December 11	Wonder Girls	"Be My Baby"
652	December 18	IU	"You & I"
653	December 25	IU	"You & I"

===== 2012 =====
List of Mutizen Songs

Key
	Triple Crown
—	No show was held

Episode	Date	Artist	Song
654	January 1	IU	"You & I"
655	January 8	Trouble Maker	"Trouble Maker"
656	January 15	T-ara	"Lovey-Dovey"
656 Part 1	January 22	T-ara	"Lovey-Dovey"
657	January 29	T-ara	"Lovey-Dovey"
658	February 5	Teen Top	"Going Crazy"
659	February 12	Seven	"When I Can't Sing"
660	February 19	Seven	"When I Can't Sing"
661	February 26	F.T. Island	"Severely"
662	March 4	Miss A	"Touch"
663	March 11	BigBang	"Blue"
664	March 18	BigBang	"Blue"
665	March 25	BigBang	"Blue"
666	April 1	Shinee	"Sherlock (Clue + Note)"
667	April 8	Shinee	"Sherlock (Clue + Note)"
668	April 15	Shinee	"Sherlock (Clue + Note)"
669	April 22	CNBLUE	"Hey You"
670	April 29	Sistar	"Alone"
671	May 6	Sistar	"Alone"
672	May 13	Girls' Generation-TTS	"Twinkle"
673	May 20	Girls' Generation-TTS	"Twinkle"
674	May 27	Girls' Generation-TTS	"Twinkle"
675	June 3	Infinite	"The Chaser"
676	June 10	Infinite	"The Chaser"
677	June 17	Wonder Girls	"Like This"
678	June 24	Wonder Girls	"Like This"
679	July 1	f(x)	"Electric Shock"
680	July 8	f(x)	"Electric Shock"
681	July 15	Sistar	"Loving U"
682	July 22	Super Junior	"Sexy, Free & Single"
683	July 29	Super Junior	"Sexy, Free & Single"
684	August 5	Sistar	"Loving U"
685	August 12	Beast	"Beautiful Night"
686	August 19	Psy	"Gangnam Style"
687	August 26	Psy	"Gangnam Style"
688	September 2	Psy	"Gangnam Style"
689	September 9	Kara	"Pandora"
690	September 16	Psy	"Gangnam Style"
691	September 23	Psy	"Gangnam Style"
692	September 30	Psy	"Gangnam Style"
693	October 7	TVXQ	"Catch Me"
694	October 14	TVXQ	"Catch Me"
—	October 21	Gain	"Bloom"
—	October 28	K.Will	"Please, Don't..."
695	November 4	HyunA	"Ice Cream"
696	November 11	Miss A	"I Don't Need A Man"
697	November 18	Lee Hi	"1,2,3,4"
698	November 24	Ailee	"I Will Show You"
699	December 2	B1A4	"Tried To Walk"
700	December 9	Lee Seung-gi	"Return"
701	December 16	Yang Yo-seob	"Caffeine"
702	December 23	Yang Yo-seob	"Caffeine"
703	December 30	Yang Yo-seob	"Caffeine"

=== Inkigayo Q ===
Viewers can ask a designated artist of the week questions through SBS mobile app Soty. During this interview segment, selected questions are asked and those users receive prizes for their participation. This segment began on February 17, 2013.

=== Inkigayo Showcase ===
A new stage to showcase talented indie and new artists who are hard to see on television each week. This segment began along with Inkigayo Chart on March 17, 2013.

=== Inkigayo Chart ===
After abolishing Take 7 in July 2012, a new chart system was implemented on March 17, 2013. The revived chart features fifty songs for viewers to vote on (like the previous Take 7 chart) through SBS mobile app Soty, combined with the Digital Song Chart and Offline Album Chart in collaboration with the Music Industry Association of Korea's Gaon Chart to create the Inkigayo Chart.

The chart is tracked from Monday to Monday of the following week.

Every song that has not yet won 3 times (i.e. Triple Crown) is eligible from this chart, regardless of when a song was released; however, OSTs, songs released through audition programs, and those deemed unsuitable (at SBS's discretion) are not eligible.

Period covered	Chart system				
Period covered	Broadcast	Digital sales	Physical sales	Video views	Voting
March 17, 2013	N/A	50%	N/A	30%	40% (20% pre-vote + 20% live-vote)
March 24, 2013 – February 1, 2015	N/A	60%	N/A	35%	15% (5% pre-vote + 10% live-vote)
February 8, 2015 – January 29, 2017	N/A	55%	5%	35%	15% (5% pre-vote + 10% live-vote)
February 5, 2017 – May 28, 2017	N/A	55%	5%	35%	5% (pre-vote only)
June 4, 2017 – January 27, 2019	10%	55%	5%	35%	5% (pre-vote only)
February 3, 2019 – January 17, 2021	10%	55%	10%	30%	5% (pre-vote only)
January 24, 2021 – September 29, 2024	10%	55%	10%	30%	10% (5% pre-vote + 5% live-vote)
October 6, 2024 – present	10%	50%	10%	20%	10% (5% pre-vote + 5% live-vote)

Explanations for each chart criterion:

- Broadcast: Number of times that a song is played on SBS.
- Digital sales: Number of streaming and downloads based on Korean charting. Currently, this is tracked on Melon, Genie, and FLO; it formerly included Bugs.
- Live-vote: Voting during the show. Currently, this is via STARPASS; it was previously via text message. This is always for 1st place nominees only.
- Physical album: Number of physical copies sold, based on the Gaon album chart.
- Video views or SNS: YouTube views, counted from official MVs only.
- Pre-voting: Voting and netizen choices, which happens before the show starts. Currently, voting is done via Melon; previously, it was through the Inkigayo website. This is held from Monday to Saturday.

==== First Place winners ====
===== 2013 – present =====
- 2013
- 2014
- 2015
- 2016
- 2017
- 2018
- 2019
- 2020
- 2021
- 2022
- 2023
- 2024
- 2025
- 2026

== Achievements by artists ==
List of Most No. 1/Mutizen Song winners

Most No. 1/Mutizen Song winners

Rank	Artist	Count
1st	IU	40
2nd	Twice	36
2nd	BTS	36
3rd	BigBang	33
4th	Blackpink	31
5th	Girls' Generation	27
6th	g.o.d	25
7th	Shinhwa	24
8th	TVXQ	22
8th	Psy	22
8th	Ive	22
9th	Super Junior	20

List of Most Triple Crown winners

Most Triple Crown winners

Rank	Artist	Count
1st	IU	10 songs
1st	BTS	10 songs
3rd	Twice	9 songs
3rd	BigBang	9 songs
5th	Blackpink	8 songs
6th	g.o.d	6 songs
7th	TVXQ	5 songs
7th	Girls' Generation	5 songs
7th	Psy	5 songs
7th	I-dle	5 songs
7th	Ive	5 songs
12th	BoA	4 songs
12th	Super Junior	4 songs
14th	Fin.K.L	3 songs
14th	Lee Hyori	3 songs
14th	Rain	3 songs
14th	SG Wannabe	3 songs
14th	Wonder Girls	3 songs
14th	NewJeans	3 songs
14th	Aespa	3 songs

Top 10 Highest Scores in Inkigayo Chart (1st – 2nd system)

Top 10 Highest Scores March 24, 2013 – February 1, 2015

Rank	Artist	Song	Score	Date
1st	Trouble Maker	"Now"	11,000	November 10, 2013
1st	Beast	"Good Luck"	11,000	June 29, 2014
2nd	Girls' Generation	"Mr.Mr."	10,974	March 9, 2014
3rd	Shinee	"Everybody"	10,735	October 27, 2013
4th	Winner	"Empty"	10,695	August 24, 2014
5th	Exo	"Growl"	10,628	August 18, 2013
6th	Apink	"Mr. Chu"	10,578	April 13, 2014
7th	Sistar	"Give It to Me"	10,554	June 30, 2013
8th	IU	"The Red Shoes"	10,521	October 20, 2013
9th	Sistar	"Give It To Me"	10,503	June 23, 2013
10th	Lee Hyori	"Bad Girls"	10,308	June 6, 2013

Top 10 Highest Scores in Inkigayo Chart (3rd – 4th system)

Top 10 Highest Scores February 8, 2015 – January 29, 2017

Rank	Artist	Song	Score	Date
1st	BigBang	"Let's Not Fall In Love"	11,000	August 23, 2015
1st	Exo	"Monster"	11,000	June 19, 2016
2nd	BigBang	"Loser"	10,909	May 10, 2015
3rd	Shinee	"View"	10,850	June 7, 2015
4th	Red Velvet	"Dumb Dumb"	10,651	September 20, 2015
5th	BigBang	"Loser"	10,594	May 17, 2015
6th	Taeyeon	"Why"	10,557	July 10, 2016
7th	Girls' Generation	"Lion Heart"	10,520	September 6, 2015
8th	BigBang	"Fxxk It"	10,500	January 8, 2017
9th	Twice	"Cheer Up"	10,429	May 8, 2016
10th	Girls' Generation	"Lion Heart"	10,372	September 13, 2015

Top 10 Highest Scores in Inkigayo Chart (5th system)

Top 10 Highest Scores February 5, 2017 – May 28, 2017

Rank	Artist	Song	Score	Date
1st	IU	"Palette"	9,790	May 7, 2017
2nd	Twice	"Knock Knock"	9,688	March 5, 2017
3rd	Twice	"Knock Knock"	9,421	March 19, 2017
4th	Highlight	"Plz Don't Be Sad"	9,274	April 2, 2017
5th	Twice	"Signal"	9,190	May 28, 2017
6th	Twice	"Knock Knock"	8,976	March 12, 2017
7th	Red Velvet	"Rookie"	8,901	February 19, 2017
8th	Winner	"Really Really"	8,811	April 16, 2017
9th	IU	"Palette"	8,691	May 14, 2017
10th	BTS	"Spring Day"	8,643	February 26, 2017

Top 10 Highest Scores in Inkigayo Chart (6th – 8th system)

Top 10 Highest Scores June 4, 2017 – January 27, 2019

Rank	Artist	Song	Score	Date
1st	BTS	"Fake Love"	10,918	June 3, 2018
2nd	Twice	"Dance the Night Away"	10,571	July 22, 2018
3rd	Twice	"What Is Love?"	10,527	April 22, 2018
4th	Red Velvet	"Power Up"	10,494	August 19, 2018
5th	Twice	"Signal"	10,421	June 4, 2017
6th	Twice	"Yes or Yes"	10,303	November 18, 2018
7th	Twice	"Heart Shaker"	10,236	December 24, 2017
8th	Blackpink	"Ddu-Du Ddu-Du"	10,170	July 1, 2018
9th	Jennie	"Solo"	10,002	November 25, 2018
10th	Wanna One	"Energetic"	9,965	August 20, 2017

Top 10 Highest Scores in Inkigayo Chart (9th – 10th system)

Top 10 Highest Scores February 3, 2019 – January 17, 2021

Rank	Artist	Song	Score	Date
1st	BTS	"Boy with Luv"	11,000	April 28, 2019
2nd	BTS	"On"	10,627	March 8, 2020
3rd	Twice	"More & More"	10,558	June 14, 2020
4th	Blackpink	"Lovesick Girls"	10,239	October 18, 2020
5th	BTS	"Life Goes On"	10,234	December 6, 2020
6th	Itzy	"Wannabe"	10,108	March 22, 2020
7th	Red Velvet	"Psycho"	10,028	January 5, 2020
8th	Twice	"Fancy"	9,841	May 5, 2019
9th	Taeyeon	"Spark"	9,782	November 10, 2019
10th	Oh My Girl	"Nonstop"	9,737	May 10, 2020

Top 10 Highest Scores in Inkigayo Chart (11th system)

Top 10 Highest Scores January 24, 2021 – September 29, 2024

Rank	Artist	Song	Score	Date
1st	Aespa	"Savage"	10,699	October 17, 2021
2nd	Ive	"I Am"	10,586	April 23, 2023
3rd	BTS	"Butter"	10,262	June 6, 2021
4th	BTS	"Butter"	9,744	June 13, 2021
5th	(G)I-dle	"Hwaa"	9,653	January 24, 2021
6th	(G)I-dle	"Tomboy"	9,648	April 3, 2022
7th	BTS	"Yet to Come"	9,479	June 26, 2022
8th	(G)I-dle	"Queencard"	9,423	June 4, 2023
9th	(G)I-dle	"Nxde"	9,409	November 6, 2022
10th	NCT Dream	"Hot Sauce"	9,405	May 23, 2021

Top 10 Highest Scores in Inkigayo Chart (Current system)

Top 10 Highest Scores October 6, 2024 – present

Rank	Artist	Song	Score	Date
1st	BTS	"Swim"	9,422	April 5, 2026
2nd	G-Dragon	"Too Bad"	8,906	March 16, 2025
3rd	BTS	"Swim"	8,590	April 12, 2026
4th	Ive	"Bang Bang"	8,345	March 1, 2026
5th	Blackpink	"Jump"	7,838	August 17, 2025
6th	Seventeen	"Thunder"	7,834	June 8, 2025
7th	Ive	"Rebel Heart"	7,588	February 6, 2025
8th	Rosé and Bruno Mars	"APT."	7,460	November 3, 2024
9th	Rosé and Bruno Mars	"APT."	7,407	November 10, 2024
10th	Aespa	"Rich Man"	7,315	September 21, 2025

Top 10 Highest Scores in Inkigayo chart (all time)

Top 10 Highest Scores March 24, 2013 – present

Rank	Artist	Song	Score	Date
1st	Trouble Maker	"Now"	11,000	November 10, 2013
1st	Beast	"Good Luck"	11,000	June 29, 2014
1st	BigBang	"Let's Not Fall In Love"	11,000	August 23, 2015
1st	Exo	"Monster"	11,000	June 19, 2016
1st	BTS	"Boy with Luv"	11,000	April 28, 2019
6th	Girls' Generation	"Mr.Mr."	10,974	March 9, 2014
7th	BTS	"Fake Love"	10,918	June 3, 2018
8th	BigBang	"Loser"	10,909	May 10, 2015
9th	Shinee	"View"	10,850	June 7, 2015
10th	Shinee	"Everybody"	10,735	October 27, 2013

== Triple Crown ==
=== Triple Crown (Old system) ===
In the old system, a Triple Crown was a song that received Mutizen Song three times. After that, the song was removed from Take 7 and was ineligible to win again.

List of Triple Crowns

Artist	Song	Wins
1999
1TYM	"1TYM"	January 24, February 7, February 14
Roo'ra	"Good"	March 14, March 21, March 28
Yoo Seung-jun	"Passion"	May 9, May 16, May 30
Fin.K.L	"Forever Love"	June 13, June 20, June 27
Sechs Kies	"Com' Back"	September 12, September 19, September 26
H.O.T.	"I Yah"	October 3, October 10, October 24
2000
g.o.d	"Sorrow"	March 5, March 12, March 19
g.o.d	"Friday Night"	April 9, April 16, April 23
Kim Min-jong	"Why"	May 7, May 14, May 21
Jo Sung-mo	"Do You Know"	September 24, October 8, October 15
H.O.T.	"Outside Castle"	October 22, October 29, November 5
Fin.K.L	"Now"	November 5, November 19, November 26
g.o.d	"Lies"	December 3, December 10, December 17
2001
Position	"I Love You"	March 4, March 11, March 18
Kim Gun-mo	"짱가"	July 8, July 15, July 22
Yoo Seung-jun	"Wow"	October 7, October 14, October 21
g.o.d	"Road"	December 9, December 16, December 23
2002
g.o.d	"Place Where You Need To Be"	January 27, February 3, February 10
jtL	"A Better Day"	February 17, February 24, March 3
S.E.S.	"U"	March 10, March 17, March 24
Fin.K.L	"Forever"	March 31, April 7, April 14
Shinhwa	"Perfect Man"	April 21, April 28, May 5
BoA	"No. 1"	May 12, May 19, May 26
Im Chang-jung	"Sad Monologue"	June 23, June 30, July 7
2003
BoA	"Atlantis Princess"	June 22, July 6, July 13
Cool	"If You Will Get Married"	August 3, August 10, August 17
Lee Hyori	"10 Minutes"	September 7, September 14, September 21
S	"I Swear"	October 19, October 26, November 2
Rain	"Ways to Avoid the Sun"	November 9, November 23, November 30
2004
MC the Max	"Love's Poem"	January 18, January 25, February 15
1TYM	"Feels So Hot"	February 1, February 8, February 22
Tei	"Love Leaves A Scent"	February 29, March 7, March 14
TVXQ	"Hug"	March 28, April 4, April 11
Koyote	"Disco King"	April 18, May 2, May 16
BoA	"My name"	July 4, July 11, July 18
Seven	"Passion"	August 8, August 15, August 29
Rain	"It's Raining"	November 7, November 21, November 28
2005
g.o.d	"반대가 끌리는 이유"	January 30, February 6, February 13
Tei	"Love Is...The Only One"	February 20, February 27, March 6
Jo Sung-mo	"Mr.Flower"	March 20, April 3, April 10
Buzz	"Coward"	March 27, April 17, April 24
BoA	"Girls on top"	July 17, July 24, July 31
Kim Jong-kook	"Walking in the Same Place"	August 7, August 14, August 21
Kim Jong-kook	"Lovely"	September 11, September 25, October 2
TVXQ	"Rising Sun"	October 9, October 16, October 23
2006
Fly to the Sky	"Like a Man"	February 5, February 12, February 19
SG Wannabe	"Partner for Life"	April 30, May 7, May 14
Super Junior	"U"	June 25, July 9, July 16
SG Wannabe	"I Loved You"	July 23, July 30, August 6
Psy	"Entertainer"	August 13, September 10, September 17
TVXQ	""O" – Jung.Ban.Hap."	October 15, October 29, November 5
2007
SS501	"4 Chance"	January 7, January 28, February 4
Ivy	"Sonata of Temptation"	April 1, April 8, April 22
SG Wannabe	"Arirang"	April 29, May 6, May 13
Yangpa	"Love... What Is It?"	June 24, July 1, July 8
F.T. Island	"Love Sick"	July 29, August 5, August 12
Wonder Girls	"Tell Me"	October 28, November 11, November 18
2008
BigBang	"Last Farewell"	December 16, December 23, January 13
Jewelry	"One More Time"	March 16, March 23, March 30
Wonder Girls	"So Hot"	June 15, June 22, June 29
Taeyang	"Only Look at Me"	July 6, July 13, July 20
Lee Hyori	"U-Go-Girl"	July 27, August 3, August 10
BigBang	"Haru Haru"	August 24, August 31, September 7
TVXQ	"Mirotic"	October 12, October 19, October 26
Rain	"Rainism"	November 2, November 9, November 16
BigBang	"Sunset Glow"	November 30, December 7, December 14
2009
Girls' Generation	"Gee"	January 18, February 1, February 8
Seungri	"Strong Baby"	February 15, February 22, March 1
Super Junior	"Sorry, Sorry"	March 29, April 5, April 12
Son Dam-bi	"On Saturday Night"	April 19, April 26, May 3
2PM	"Again & Again"	May 10, May 17, May 24
2NE1	"I Don't Care"	July 26, August 2, August 9
G-Dragon	"Heartbreaker"	September 6, September 13, September 20
Shinee	"Ring Ding Dong"	November 1, November 8, November 15
2PM	"'Heartbeat"	November 29, December 6, December 13
2010
T-ara	"Bo Peep Bo Peep"	January 3, January 10, January 17
After School	"Because of You"	December 20, December 27, January 24
Girls' Generation	"Oh!"	February 14, February 21, February 28
Lee Hyori	"Chitty Chitty Bang Bang"	April 25, May 2, May 9
Super Junior	"Bonamana"	May 30, June 6, June 13
2NE1	"Can't Nobody"	September 19, September 26, October 3
Girls' Generation	"Hoot"	November 7, November 21, November 28
2011
IU	"Good Day"	December 19, December 26, January 2
TVXQ	"Keep Your Head Down"	January 16, January 23, January 30
BigBang	"Tonight"	March 6, March 13, March 20
BigBang	"Love Song"	April 17, April 24, May 1
f(x)	"Pinocchio (Danger)"	May 8, May 15, May 22
Super Junior	"Mr. Simple"	August 21, August 28, September 4
Girls' Generation	"The Boys"	October 30, November 6, November 13
Wonder Girls	"Be My Baby"	November 27, December 4, December 11
2012
IU	"You & I"	December 18, December 25, January 1
T-ara	"Lovey-Dovey"	January 15, January 22, January 29
BigBang	"Blue"	March 11, March 18, March 25
Shinee	"Sherlock (Clue + Note)"	April 1, April 8, April 15
Girls' Generation-TTS	"Twinkle"	May 13, May 20, May 27
Psy	"Gangnam Style"	August 19, August 26, September 2

=== Triple Crown (New system) ===
Triple Crown is a song that has received First Place three times. After that, the song is removed from the chart and ineligible to win again.

List of Triple Crowns

Artist	Song	Wins
2013
Psy	"Gentleman"	April 21, April 28, May 5
Exo	"Growl"	August 18, August 25, September 1
2014
AKMU	"200%"	April 20, April 27, May 4
Exo-K	"Overdose"	May 18, May 25, June 1
Taeyang	"Eyes, Nose, Lips"	June 15, June 22, July 6
Sistar	"Touch My Body"	August 3, August 10, August 17
Apink	"Luv"	December 7, December 14, December 28
2015
Exo	"Call Me Baby"	April 5, April 12, April 19
BigBang	"Loser"	May 10, May 17, May 24
Girls' Generation	"Lion Heart"	August 30, September 6, September 13
Taeyeon	"I"	October 18, October 25, November 22
Psy	"Daddy"	December 13, December 20, December 27
2016
Suzy & Baekhyun	"Dream"	January 17, January 24, January 31
GFriend	"Rough"	February 7, February 21, February 28
Twice	"Cheer Up"	May 8, May 22, May 29
GFriend	"Navillera"	July 24, July 31, August 7
Twice	"TT"	November 6, November 13, November 20
2017
BigBang	"Fxxk It"	December 25, January 1, January 8
Twice	"Knock Knock"	March 5, March 12, March 19
IU	"Palette"	April 30, May 7, May 14
Twice	"Signal"	May 28, June 4, June 11
Blackpink	"As If It's Your Last"	July 2, July 9, July 16
Sunmi	"Gashina"	September 3, September 10, September 24
BTS	"DNA"	October 1, October 8, October 15
Twice	"Likey"	November 12, November 19, November 26
2018
Twice	"Heart Shaker"	December 24, December 31, January 7
iKon	"Love Scenario"	February 18, February 25, March 4
Mamamoo	"Starry Night"	March 18, March 25, April 1
Twice	"What Is Love?"	April 22, April 29, May 6
BTS	"Fake Love"	May 27, June 3, June 10
Blackpink	"Ddu-Du Ddu-Du"	June 24, July 1, July 8
Twice	"Dance the Night Away"	July 22, July 29, August 5
BTS	"Idol"	September 2, September 9, September 16
IU	"Bbibbi"	October 21, October 28, November 4
Jennie	"Solo"	November 25, December 2, December 16
2019
Itzy	"Dalla Dalla"	February 24, March 3, March 10
BTS	"Boy with Luv"	April 28, May 12, May 19
IU	"Blueming"	December 1, December 8, December 15
Mamamoo	"Hip"	November 24, December 22, December 29
2020
Red Velvet	"Psycho"	January 5, January 12, January 19
Zico	"Any Song"	January 26, February 2, February 9
BTS	"On"	March 1, March 8, March 15
Itzy	"Wannabe"	March 22, March 29, April 5
IU	"Eight"	May 17, May 24, May 31
Blackpink	"How You Like That"	July 5, July 12, July 19
Hwasa	"Maria"	July 26, August 2, August 9
BTS	"Dynamite"	August 30, September 6, September 13
Blackpink	"Ice Cream"	September 20, September 27, October 4
Blackpink	"Lovesick Girls"	October 11, October 18, October 25
BTS	"Life Goes On"	November 29, December 6, December 13
2021
Twice	"I Can't Stop Me"	November 8, November 15, January 3
IU	"Celebrity"	February 7, February 21, February 28
IU	"Lilac"	April 4, April 11, April 18
Brave Girls	"Rollin'"	March 14, March 21, May 9
BTS	"Butter"	May 30, June 6, June 13
BTS	"Permission to Dance"	July 18, August 8, August 15
Lee Mu-jin	"Traffic Light"	August 22, September 19, September 26
Aespa	"Savage"	October 17, October 24, December 5
IU	"Strawberry Moon"	October 31, November 21, December 12
2022
Ive	"Eleven"	January 9, January 16, January 23
Taeyeon	"INVU"	February 27, March 6, March 13
BigBang	"Still Life"	April 17, April 24, May 1
Psy	"That That"	May 15, May 22, May 29
(G)I-dle	"Tomboy"	March 27, April 3, June 5
Ive	"Love Dive"	May 8, July 3, July 17
Nayeon	"Pop!"	July 10, July 24, August 7
Blackpink	"Pink Venom"	September 4, September 18, September 25
Blackpink	"Shut Down"	October 2, October 9, October 16
(G)I-dle	"Nxde"	November 6, November 13, November 20
Younha	"Event Horizon"	November 27, December 4, December 11
2023
NewJeans	"Ditto"	January 8, January 29, February 5
NewJeans	"OMG"	January 15, March 19, March 26
(G)I-dle	"Queencard"	May 28, June 4, June 11
Ive	"I Am"	April 23, June 18, June 25
Jisoo	"Flower"	April 16, April 30, July 2
Jungkook	"Seven"	July 30, August 6, August 13
NewJeans	"Super Shy"	July 23, August 20, August 27
AKMU	"Love Lee"	September 17, October 15, October 22
Ive	"Baddie"	November 12, November 19, December 3
2024
Aespa	"Drama"	November 26, January 7, January 14
IU	"Love Wins All"	February 4, February 18, February 25
(G)I-dle	"Fate"	March 31, April 7, April 14
Illit	"Magnetic"	April 21, April 28, May 5
Aespa	"Supernova"	May 26, June 16, June 23
(G)I-dle	"Klaxon"	August 11, August 18, August 25
Rosé	"Apt."	October 28, November 3, November 10
Aespa	"Whiplash"	November 17, November 24, December 1
2025
G-Dragon	"Home Sweet Home"	December 15 (2024), January 5, January 12 (2025)
Ive	"Rebel Heart"	January 26, February 2, February 9
G-Dragon	"Too Bad"	March 9, March 16, March 23
Blackpink	"Jump"	August 3, August 10, August 17
Aespa	"Rich Man"	September 21, September 28, October 12
Nmixx	"Blue Valentine"	October 26, November 9, November 16
2026
Hwasa	"Good Goodbye"	December 7 (2025), January 11, January 18
BTS	"Swim"	March 29, April 5, April 12
Cortis	"RedRed"	May 17, May 24, May 31
Illit	"It's Me"	June 7, June 14, June 21
A2O Lite	"Neon"	October 25, November 1, November 8

== Similar programs ==
- KBS Music Bank
- MBC Show! Music Core
- Mnet M Countdown
- Arirang TV Pops in Seoul
- Arirang TV Simply K-Pop (formerly called The M-Wave and Wave K)
- Arirang TV Show K-Pop
- JTBC Music on Top
- JTBC Music Universe K-909
- MBC M Show Champion
- SBS M The Show

== See also ==
- SBS Gayo Daejeon
- Music programs of South Korea
