= Trouble Maker (duo) =

South Korean vocal duo

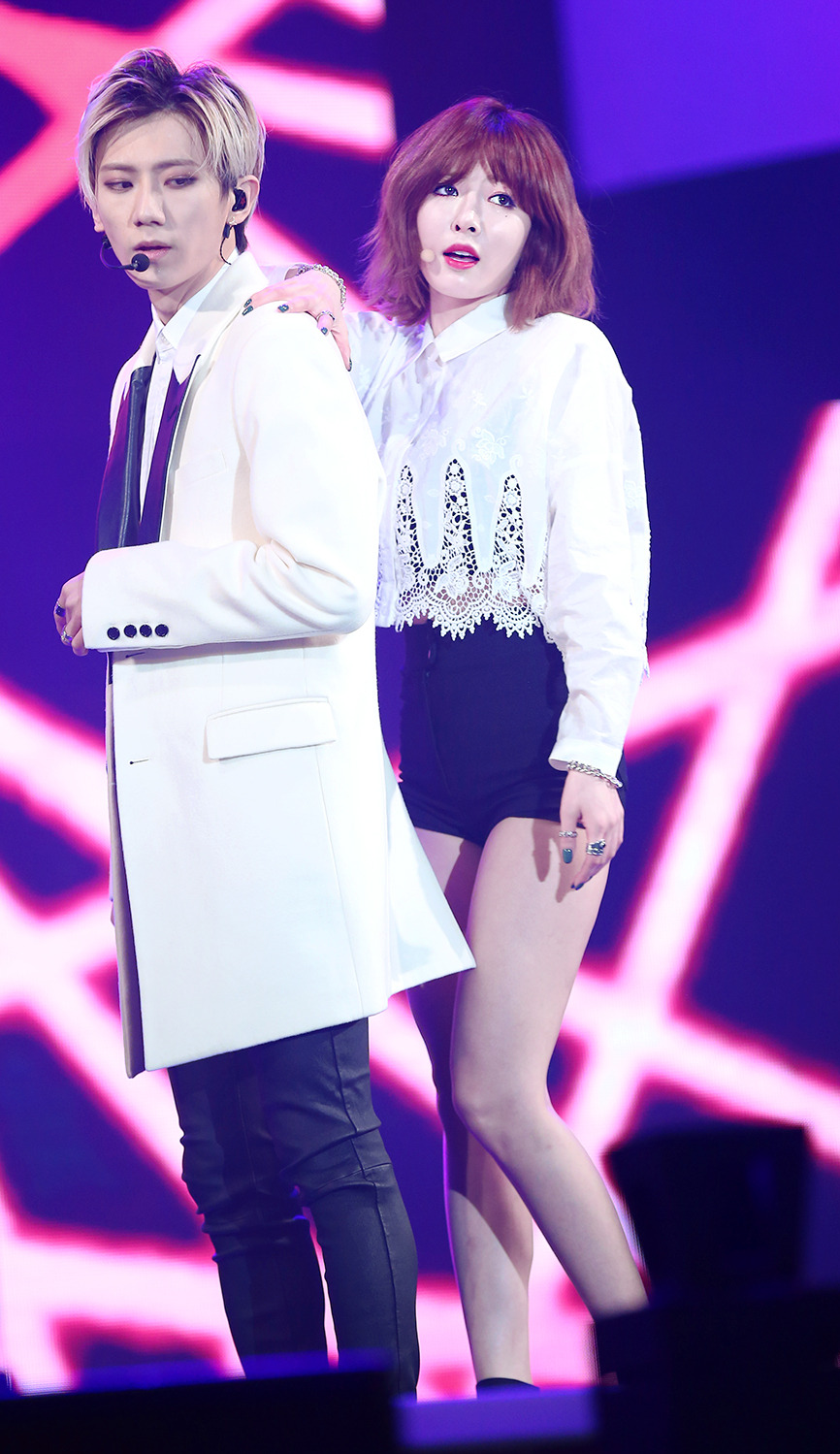
- Trouble Maker in 2014

Background information
- Origin: Seoul, South Korea
- Genres: K-pop
- Years active: 2011–2014
- Label: Cube
- Past members: Hyunseung; Hyuna
- Website: cubeent.co.kr/troublemaker

Trouble Maker (Korean: 트러블 메이커) was a South Korean duo formed by Cube Entertainment in 2011, composed of Hyunseung and Hyuna.

== Career ==
=== 2011: Formation and debut with Trouble Maker ===
In November 2011, Cube Entertainment labelmates Hyun-seung (former member of Beast) and Hyuna (former member of 4Minute and Wonder Girls) formed the duo Trouble Maker. Hyuna had previously released two singles, but both described the sub-unit as something different to either of their respective groups. The sub-unit was officially billed as 'JS & Hyuna', which Hyun-seung went on to reveal on his Twitter included his new stage name for the subunit, Jay Stomp.

On November 25, the unit started revealing teaser photos for the album, revealing a private-party concept. The duo also gave a teaser performance at the 2011 Mnet Asian Music Awards, which included an on-stage kiss. The duo's first mini-album and single, both eponymously titled "Trouble Maker", were released on December 1, 2011.

The duo's live performances of "Trouble Maker" on weekly music shows were criticized by the Korean media for their sexually suggestive choreography. In response, Cube Entertainment altered the choreography for the rest of the promotion period of "Trouble Maker". The duo also performed "Trouble Maker" at the United Cube concerts in London and Brazil in December 2011. Trouble Maker went on to win the triple crown on M! Countdown for "Trouble Maker".

=== 2013: Chemistry ===
In October 2013, Cube Entertainment confirmed Trouble Maker's upcoming comeback with a racy photoshoot. On October 28, the group released the single "Now" from its Chemistry EP. The single's music video, which drew inspiration from serial criminals Bonnie and Clyde, earned a 19+ rating for its heavy references to sex, alcohol, and cigarettes. "Now" had the highest score ever recorded on music show Inkigayo, maxing out at 11,000 points.

=== 2018—2021: Departures from Cube Entertainment ===
On September 13, 2018, Hyuna was announced to have been removed from Cube Entertainment alongside Pentagon's E'Dawn, following the announcement they had been dating. The next day, Cube withdrew the decision due to severe backlash from fans and a drop in stocks, and announced they would further discuss it with the two. On October 5, it was announced Hyuna would end her contract with Cube due to Cube's previous violation.

On August 2, 2021, Hyunseung also left Cube Entertainment.

== Discography ==
=== Extended plays ===
Title	Details	Peak positions				Sales
Title	Details	KOR	TWN	TWN East Asian (Note: Position was taken from 2012 week 5 for Troublemaker, 2013 week 46 for Chemistry.)	US World	Sales
Trouble Maker	Released: December 1, 2011; Labels: Cube Entertainment; Formats: CD, digital download	2	13	1	—	KOR: 36,427+
Chemistry	Released: October 28, 2013; Label: Cube Entertainment; Format: CD, digital download	2	—	3	8	KOR: 30,934+
"—" denotes releases that did not chart or were not released in that region.

=== Singles ===
Title	Year	Peak positions			Sales (DL)	Album
Title	Year	KOR Gaon	KOR Hot 100	JPN Hot 100	Sales (DL)	Album
"Trouble Maker"	2011	1	2	95	KOR: 4,408,787	Trouble Maker
"Now (There Is No Tomorrow)"	2013	1	1	—	KOR: 2,500,000	Chemistry
"—" denotes releases that did not chart or were not released in that region.

=== Music videos ===
Year	Title
2011	"Trouble Maker"
2013	"Now"
2013	"Now" (Uncut Version)

== Awards and nominations ==
Year	Award	Category	Nominated work	Result
2012	Mnet 20's Choice Awards	Hot Performance Star	Trouble Maker	Won
2012	14th Mnet Asian Music Awards	Best Collaboration Performance	Trouble Maker	Won
2012	4th Melon Music Awards	Song of the Year	Trouble Maker	Nominated
2012	4th Melon Music Awards	Best Global Artist	Trouble Maker	Nominated
2012	4th Melon Music Awards	Best Music Video	Trouble Maker	Nominated
2012	4th Melon Music Awards	Hot Trend Song	Trouble Maker	Won
2012	27th Golden Disk Awards	Best Dance Performance	Trouble Maker	Won
2012	27th Golden Disk Awards	MSN International Award	Trouble Maker	Nominated
2014	World Music Awards	World's Best Song	Now	Nominated
2014	World Music Awards	World's Best Video	Now	Nominated
2014	Singapore Entertainment Awards	Most Popular K-pop Music Video	Now	Nominated
2015	3rd European K-POP / J-POP Music Award	Best TV Stage Performance	Now	Won
