= List of K-pop songs on the Billboard Japan Hot 100 =

Current Billboard logo.

List of K-pop songs on the Billboard Japan Hot 100 is a compilation of weekly chart information for K-pop music published on the Billboard Japan Hot 100 chart by the Billboard charts, and reported on by Billboard K-Town, an online Billboard column. This is a list of K-pop songs and singles, and songs performed by K-pop artists, on the Billboard chart. More song chart information can be found at the List of K-pop songs on the Billboard charts.

- This list depends on continual updates taken from *Billboard artist/title/chart search and *Billboard charts.
- Years 2009–2011 on the chart are not fully updated and are marked (Incomplete)
- Years 2008 and 2012–present are fully updated (Complete) with no marking
- Billboard artists comprehensive update incomplete.
- Billboard charts comprehensive update incomplete.
- Figures in red highlight indicate the highest ranking achieved by K-pop artists on the chart.
- – Current week's charting
- The chart was launched in January 2008.

== 2008–2019 ==
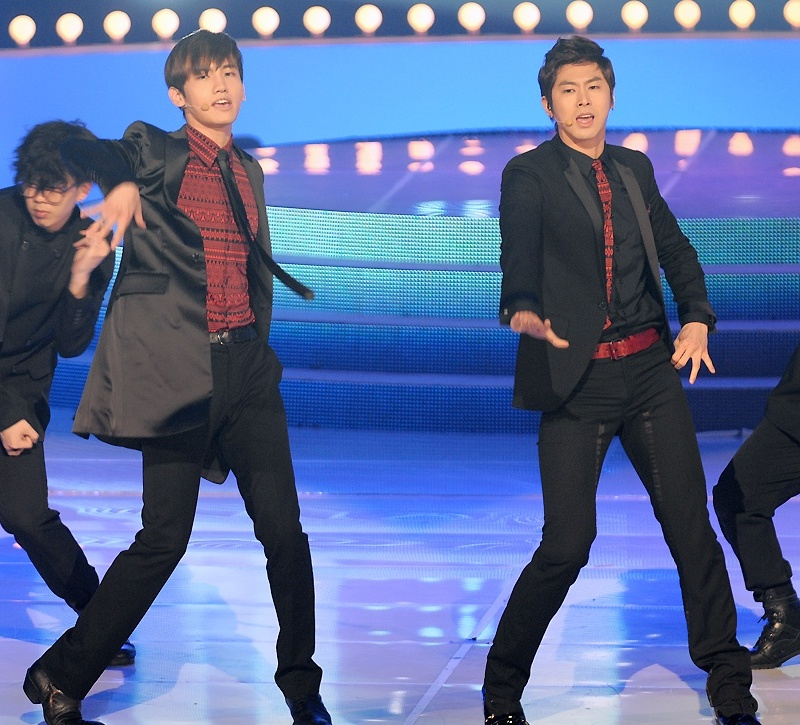
TVXQ, performing in 2011. Known as Tohoshinki in Japan, the original group of five charted the earliest number-one hits by a K-pop act in 2009 and 2010. The continuing duo has been one of the most consistent charters to date.

Chart date	Artist	Title	Peak position	Weeks
2008
2008-01-26	TVXQ	"Purple Line"	10	3
2008-01-26	J-Min	"Dream on..."	90	1
2008-02-02	Sunmin	"Another Wish"	65	1
2008-02-16	TVXQ	"Two Hearts"	57	1
2008-02-20	TVXQ	"Runaway"	49	1
2008-02-27	BoA	"Be With You"	8	4
2008-03-05	TVXQ	"If...!?"	32	1
2008-03-12	TVXQ	"Close to You"	42	1
2008-03-19	TVXQ	"Keyword"	33	1
2008-04-30	TVXQ	"Beautiful You"	10	3
2008-04-30	Ryu Si-won	"I Love You"	18	1
2008-06-04	BoA	"Kissing You"	17	3
2008-06-11	BoA	"Sparkling"	88	1
2008-07-23	TVXQ	"Dōshite Kimi o Suki ni Natte Shimattandarō?"	6	4
2008-07-30	Park Yong-ha	"Behind Love"	59	1
2008-08-13	Kim Yon-ja	"Dawn"	63	2
2008-10-15	Sunmin	"Will"	10	3
2008-10-22	TVXQ	"Mirotic"	4	2
2008-10-22	Lee Byung-hun	"Itsuka"	7	2
2008-10-22	Ryu Si-won	"Kimi to Boku"	18	2
2008-10-29	The Grace with Cliff Edge	"Here"	19	3
2008-11-12	Super Junior-T with Moeyan	"Rokkugo!"	61	1
2008-11-19	Park Yong-ha	"Say Goodbye"	86	1
2008-12-10	Peppertones	"Superfantastic"	73	4
2008-12-24	BoA	"Meri Kuri"	80	2
2009 (Incomplete)
2009-01-28	TVXQ	"Bolero"	6	3
2009-02-25	BoA	"Eien"	23	4
2009-03-19	TVXQ	"Survivor"	11	3
2009-03-19	Ryu Si-won	"Cafe Wonderland"	28	2
2009-04-01	Jang Eun-sook	"覚悟次第"	63	1
2009-04-15	Kim Yon-ja	"Kita no Acacia" (北のアカシヤ)	67	2
2009-04-29	TVXQ	"Share the World"	4	5
2009-05-18	W-inds feat. G-Dragon	"Rain Is Fallin'"	8	3
2009-05-27	Cheuni	"Hirenka" (悲恋歌)	96	1
2009-06-27	BigBang	"My Heaven"	4	4
2009-07-11	TVXQ	"Stand by U"	2	3
2009-07-18	BigBang	"Gara Gara Go!"	15	2
2009-08-29	Tae Jin-ah	"Sumanai"	96	1
2009-08-29	Crystal Kay feat. BoA	"Girlfriend"	57	1
2009-09-05	BigBang	"Bringing You Love"	88	1
2009-10-10	TVXQ's Jaejoong and Yoochun	"Colors (Melody and Harmony)"	1 (Note: Peaked at No.1 on 2009-10-17 (1 week))	4
2009-10-24	Ryu Si-won	"Memu"	44	1
2009-11-07	BoA feat. M-Flo	"Bump Bump!"	6	3
2009-11-21	BigBang	"Koe o Kikasete"	10	2
2009-12-05	Park Yong-ha	"Saiai no Hito"	93	1
2009-12-26	BoA	"Mamoritai (White Wishes)"	4	5
2010 (Incomplete)
2010-01-02	BoA	"Meri Kuri"	23	5 (R) 46
2010-02-06	TVXQ/Tohoshinki	"Break Out!"	1 (Note: Peaked at No.1 on 2010-02-13 (1 week))	5
2010-02-06	Thelma Aoyama feat. BigBang's Taeyang	"Fall in Love"	9	2
2010-02-27	BoA (duet with Daichi Miura)	"Possibility"	58	1
2010-04-10	TVXQ/Tohoshinki	"Toki o Tomete"	1 (Note: Entered at No.1 for 1 week)	4
2010-06-05	F.T. Island	"Flower Rock"	50	1
2010-06-12	Xia	"Intoxication"	4	3
2010-06-26	BigBang	"Tell Me Goodbye"	16	2
2010-07-17	Tae Jin-ah	"Inochi No Hana"	80	1
2010-07-31	F.T. Island	"Brand New Days"	33	2
2010-09-11	BigBang	"Beautiful Hangover"	14	2
2010-09-18	Shojo Jidai	"Genie"	4	2 (R) 5
2010-10-16	Shojo Jidai	"Gee"	2	23
2010-11-13	Kara	"Jumping"	4	?
2010-12-04	F.T. Island	"So Today..."	31	1
2011 (Incomplete)
2011-02-12	TVXQ/Tohoshinki	"Keep Your Head Down"	1	7
2011-02-12	Shojo Jidai	"Run Devil Run"	19	?
2011-03-19	Kara	"Yasashikute	61	?
2011-03-26	4Minute	"Why"	40	?
2011-04-02	B2ST	"Shock"	5	?
2011-04-02	Ryu Si-won	"Aishitai Kimi Wo Aishitai"	59	1
2011-04-09	Kara	"Jet Coaster Love"	6	?
2011-04-09	Kara	"Ima, Okuritai"Arigatou"	2	?
2011-04-30	Shojo Jidai	Mr. Taxi	1 (Total 2 weeks) (Note: Peaked at No.1 on 2011-05-14 (2 weeks))	19
2011-05-07	F.T. Island	"Satisfaction"	9	2
2011-05-14	Jang Keun-suk	"Let Me Cry"	2	?
2011-05-14	MBLAQ	"Your Luv"	65	?
2011-05-14	2PM	"Take Off"	3	5
2011-05-28	BigBang	"Tonight"	65	2
2011-06-25	Super Junior	"Bonamana"	8	?
2011-06-25	Kara	"Go Go Summer!"	2	13 (R) 14
2011-07-02	B2ST	"Bad Girl"	10	?
2011-07-02	Shinee	"Replay (Kimi wa Boku no Everything)"	2	?
2011-07-02	Kara	"Mister"	9	29
2011-07-09	Kara	"Sayonara No Natsu~Kokurikozaka"	94	?
2011-08-06	TVXQ/Tohoshinki	"Superstar"	1 (Note: Peaked at No.1 on 2010-02-13 (1 week))	?
2011-08-13	F.T. Island	"Let It Go"	6	1
2011-08-27	2PM	"I'm Your Man"	3	4
2011-08-20	Secret	"Madonna"	18 (Note: info. on 2011-08-27 chart))	?
2011-09-03	AFTERSCHOOL	"Bang!"	10	?
2011-09-03	Shinee	"Juliette"	3	5
2011-09-03	Shu-I	"Summer Sweet"	81	?
2011-09-24	4Minute	"Heart to Heart"	42	?
2011-09-24	Ryu Si-won	"Negaiboshi"	70	1
2011-09-24	Rainbow	"A"	4	6
2011-10-01	2NE1	"Ugly"	18	3 (R) 4
2011-10-08	2NE1	"I Am the Best"	53	5
2011-10-08	T-ara	"Bo Peep Bo Peep"	1 (Note: Peaked at No.1 on 2011-10-15 (1 week))	7
2011-10-08	TVXQ/Tohoshinki	"Back To Tomorrow"	94	1
2011-10-08	TVXQ/Tohoshinki	"B.U.T (Be-Au-Ty)"	65	4
2011-10-15	Kara	"Step"	38	3 (R) 4
2011-10-22	Shinee	"Lucifer"	4	4
2011-10-22	Shin Hye-sung and Shunsuke Kiyokiba	"I Believe"	43	1
2011-10-22	Double feat. Jun. K	"Count 3"	83	1
2011-10-29	Kara	"Winter Magic"	2	15
2011-10-29	CNBLUE	"In My Head"	4	4
2011-11-12	MBLAQ	"Baby U!"	6	1
2011-11-12	2PM	"Ultra Lover"	6	4
2011-11-26	2NE1	"Go Away"	14	3
2011-12-03	Infinite	"BTD"	20	2
2011-12-03	T-ara	"Yayaya"	6	4
2011-12-10	AFTERSCHOOL	"Diva"	26	2
2011-12-17	TVXQ/Tohoshinki	"Winter Rose"	2	5
2011-12-17	F.T. Island	"Distance"	8	1
2011-12-17	BoA	"Milestone"	7	5
2011-12-17	Rainbow	"Mach"	15	3
2011-12-24	Super Junior	"Mr. Simple"	12	2
2011-12-24	Shinee	"To Your Heart"	67	1
2011-12-24	JAMOSA and Kevin & Eli	"Together"	68	1
2011-12-24	Shu-I	"Nebagiba Yeah!"	92	1
2011-12-31	U-KISS	"Tick Tack"	46	1
2012
2012-01-21	2AM	"Never Let You Go: Shindemo Hanasanai"		4
2012-01-28	Se7en	"Somebody Else"	51	1
2012-02-11	Kim Hyun-joong	"Kiss Kiss"	2	3
2012-02-11	AFTERSCHOOL	"Rambling Girls"	24	2
2012-02-11	CNBLUE	"Where You Are"	2	3
2012-03-03	T-ara	"Roly-Poly"	5	5
2012-03-17	Secret	"Kore Kurai no Sayonara"	55	1
2012-03-31	TVXQ/Tohoshinki	"Still"	1	3
2012-03-31	Rainbow	"Gana Gana Go!"	23	2
2012-03-31	Kara	"Girl's Power"	7	4
2012-03-31	IU	"Good Day"	5	3
2012-03-31	Kara	"Speed Up"	3	7
2012-04-07	Ryu Si-won	"Bokura Ga Deatta Sono Basho Ni"	61	1
2012-04-07	Supernova's Jung Yunhak	"Again"	27	1
2012-04-14	2NE1	"Scream"	18	2
2012-04-14	BigBang	"Fantastic Baby"	8	2 (R) 78 (R) 80
2012-04-14	2NE1	"Like a Virgin" (Madonna cover)	79	1
2012-04-21	Donghae & Eunhyuk	"Oppa, Oppa"	5	2
2012-04-28	2AM	"Denwa ni Denai Kimi ni"	19	2
2012-04-28	Shu-I	"Hitorijime"	42	1
2012-05-05	Infinite	"Be Mine"	3	1
2012-05-05	F.T. Island	"Neverland"	13	1
2012-05-26	Super Junior	"Opera"	3	2
2012-06-02	Shinee	"Sherlock"	4	3
2012-06-09	T-ara	"Lovey-Dovey"	11	3
2012-06-09	Choshinsei	"Stupid Love"	44	1
2012-06-16	CODE-V	"Kimi Ga Kureta Mono"	47	1
2012-06-23	2PM	"Beautiful"	2	2
2012-06-30	AFTERSCHOOL	"Lady Luck"	20	2
2012-06-30	Secret	"Twinkle, Twinkle"	63	1
2012-07-07	BigBang	"Monster"	6	3
2012-07-14	B1A4	"Beautiful Target"	8	1
2012-07-21	Kim Hyun-joong	"Heat"	2	2
2012-07-21	2AM and 2PM	"One Day"	5	2
2012-07-21	TVXQ/Tohoshinki	"Android"	2	4
2012-08-04	IU	"You And I"	11	2 (R) 3
2012-08-11	U-KISS	"Dear My Friend"	34	1
2012-08-18	CNBLUE	"Come On"	8	1
2012-08-25	F.T. Island	"Top Secret"	14	1
2012-09-08	Super Junior	"Sexy, Free & Single"	3	2
2012-09-08	Boyfriend	"Be my shine Kimi Wo Hanasanai"	4	1
2012-09-15	Infinite	"She's Back"	4	1
2012-09-15	B1A4	"Oyasumi, Good Night"	11	1
2012-09-15	Choushinsei	"She's Gone"	22	1
2012-09-22	Orange Caramel	"Yasashii Akuma"	23	1
2012-09-22	U-KISS	"One Of You"	30	1
2012-09-29	2AM	"For You: Kimi no Tame ni Dekiru Koto"	16	1
2012-10-06	2NE1	"I Love You"	29	1
2012-10-13	Shojo Jidai	"Oh!"	1	4
2012-10-13	T-ara	"Day By Day"	16	1
2012-10-20	Psy	"Gangnam Style"	19	3 (R) 10
2012-10-20	Shinee	"Dazzling Girl"	2	3
2012-10-27	Kara	"Electric Boy"	1 (Note: Peaked at No.1 on 2012-11-03 (1 week))	6
2012-11-03	CODE-V	"Sekaiju Ga Teki Ni Nattemo Kitto Kimi Wo Mamorinukukara"	39	1
2012-11-03	Choshinsei's Jung Yunhak	"WAITING 4 U"	29	1
2012-11-03	B2ST	"Midnight"	34	1
2012-12-01	2PM	"Masquerade"	2	2
2012-12-01	T-ara	"Sexy Love"	5	2
2012-12-01	Shojo Jidai	Flower Power	6	
2012-12-08	MYNAME	"What's Up"	85	1
2012-12-15	Boyfriend	"Kimi To Dance Dance Dance"	8	1
2012-12-15	F.T. Island	"Polar Star"	11	1
2012-12-22	2AM	"Darenimo Watasenai Yo"	17	1
2012-12-29	Shinee	"1000nen, Zutto Soba ni Ite..."	3	1
2012-12-29	U-KISS	"Distance.."	39	1
2012-12-29	Orange Caramel	"Lipstick"	96	1
2013
2013-01-05	CNBLUE	"Robot"	5	2
2013-01-19	Shojo Jidai	I Got a Boy	98	1
2013-01-26	TVXQ/Tohoshinki	Catch Me"	1 (Note: Peaked at No.1 on 2013-02-02 (1 week))	4
2013-02-09	Super Junior-K.R.Y.	"Promise You"	10	2
2013-02-23	CODE-V	"Nando Sayonara Wo Kurikaeshitara Bokura Ha Tsuyokunarerunoka?"	39	1
2013-03-02	U-KISS	"Alone"	11	1
2013-03-02	BoA	"Only One"	8	4
2013-03-02	Apeace	"X.O.X.O~Yume Wo Idaite"	57	1
2013-03-16	BigBang's Daesung	"Utautai No Ballad"	68	1
2013-03-23	IU	"Beautiful Dancer"	66	4
2013-03-23	Cross Gene	"Shooting Star"	48	2
2013-03-30	Shinee	"Fire"	7	2
2013-04-06	T-ara	"Banisuta!"	3	2
2013-04-06	IU	"New World"	76	1
2013-04-13	Kara	"Bye Bye Happy Days!"	2	3
2013-04-13	Boyfriend	"Hitomi No Melody"	5	1
2013-04-13	F.T. Island	"You Are My Life"	6	1
2013-04-13	Choushinsei	"Da Ki Shi Me Ta I"	14	1
2013-04-13	MBLAQ	"Mona Lisa"	56	1
2013-05-04	Psy	"Gentleman"	51	1 (R) 2
2013-05-11	CNBLUE	"Blind Love"	7	1
2013-06-15	2PM	"Give Me Love"	3	3
2013-06-15	Shojo Jidai	Love & Girls	3	1 (R) 2
2013-06-15	Jang Keun-suk	"Nature Boy"	99	1
2013-06-15	F.Cuz	"Hello Again"	100	1
2013-06-22	Kim Hyun-joong	"Tonight"	6	1
2013-06-29	TVXQ/Tohoshinki	"Ocean"	2	2
2013-07-06	Donghae & Eunhyuk	"I Wanna Dance"	8	1
2013-07-13	BoA	"Tail of Hope"	19	1
2013-07-13	Shinee	"Breaking News"	52	1
2013-07-27	T-ara	"Target"	27	1
2013-07-27	Kim Nam-gil	"Roman"	91	1
2013-08-10	Kara	"Thank You Summer Love"	1	2
2013-08-10	F.T. Island	"Shiawase Theory"	25	1
2013-08-17	CNBLUE	"Lady"	7	1
2013-08-17	BigBang's Daesung feat. Taro Hakase	"I Love You"	13	1
2013-08-24	Choushinsei	"Winner"	6	1
2013-08-24	CODE-V	"Yakusoku"	25	1
2013-09-07	Shinee	"Boys Meet U"	2	4
2013-09-14	B1A4	"Igemu Sun Iriya (Nande, Doshite)"	4	1
2013-09-14	Kara Universal Music Sigma	"Thank You Summer Love"	83	1
2013-09-21	TVXQ/Tohoshinki	"Scream"	2	2
2013-09-28	Shojo Jidai	Galaxy Supernova	4	5
2013-09-28	IU	"Monday Afternoon"	27	1
2013-10-05	JYJ	"Only One"	52	1
2013-10-19	AFTERSCHOOL	"Heaven"	28	1
2013-10-26	B.A.P	"Warrior"	17	1
2013-10-26	Kim Wooyong & 45 Trio	"Kokyo No Ushiro Sugata"	78	5 (R) 6
2013-11-02	2PM	"Winter Games"	1	3
2013-11-02	Apeace	"Ur My Life"	55	1
2013-11-02	Seo In-guk	"We Can Dance Tonight"	86	1
2013-11-23	Ailee	"Heaven"	38	1
2013-11-23	F.Cuz	"Change"	53	1
2013-11-30	CODE-V	"Ima, Tsutaeru Koto"	25	1
2013-11-30	B.A.P	"One Shot"	30	1
2013-12-07	Boyfriend	"Pinky Santa"	9	1
2013-12-07	T-ara	"Number 9"	62	1
2013-12-07	MYNAME	"Shirayuki"	98	1
2013-12-14	TVXQ/Tohoshinki	"Very Merry Xmas"	3	6
2013-12-14	Kara	"French Kiss"	24	2
2013-12-21	Shinee	"3 2 1"	2	2 (R) 3
2013-12-28	Super Junior	"Blue World"	6	3
2013-12-28	BigBang's Taeyang	"Ringa Linga"	83	1
2014
2014-01-04	U-KISS	"Fall In Love"	37	2
2014-01-04	B2ST	"Sad Movie"	55	2
2014-01-18	LEDApple	"Greatest World"	82	1
2014-02-08	F.T. Island	"Beautiful"	23	1
2014-02-15	Choshinsei's Jung Yunhak	"Kimi No Subete Wo Aishiteitayo"	69	1
2014-02-22	TVXQ/Tohoshinki	"Hide & Seek"	2	2 (R) 3
2014-02-22	Secret	"I Do I Do"	65	1
2014-03-08	U-KISS	"Break Up"	52	1
2014-03-15	MBLAQ	"Still In Love"	73	1
2014-03-22	BoA	"Shout It Out"	37	2
2014-03-22	T-ara	"Lead The Way"	46	1
2014-03-29	M-Flo and BigBang's Taeyang	"Go Crazy"	63	2
2014-04-05	Boyfriend	"My Avatar"	5	2
2014-04-19	B.A.P	"No Mercy"	2	1
2014-04-19	F.T. Island	"Future Mitaiken Future"	17	1
2014-05-10	CNBLUE	"Truth"	7	2
2014-05-17	Apeace	"Veil"	88	1
2014-05-24	LEDapple	"Who Are You (Ai No Flower)"	48	1
2014-05-31	2PM's Jun. K	"Love & Hate"	22	1
2014-06-28	TVXQ/Tohoshinki	"Sweat"	1	5 (R) 8
2014-07-05	Kim Hyun-joong	"Hot Sun"	5	1
2014-07-05	F.Cuz	"Feeling My Soul"	26	1
2014-07-12	Shinee	"Lucky Star"	2	2
2014-07-12	2NE1	"Crush"	19	1
2014-07-12	Jang Keun-suk & DJ Big Brother (Team H)	"Take Me"	32	1
2014-07-19	Infinite	"Last Romeo"	3	1
2014-08-02	U-KISS	"Love On U"	31	1
2014-08-02	CODE-V	"Never Say Never"	43	1
2014-08-02	Shojo Jidai	"Indestructible"	89	1
2014-08-09	BoA	"Masayume Chasing"	27	2
2014-08-09	Secret	"Yoo Hoo"	69	1
2014-09-06	CNBLUE	"Go Your Way"	15	1
2014-09-13	Kara	"Mamma Mia"	9	2
2014-09-20	B.A.P	"Excuse Me"	3	2
2014-09-27	B1A4	"Solo Day"	3	1
2014-10-04	2PM	"Midaretemina"	1	2
2014-10-18	AOA	"Miniskirt"	33	1
2014-11-01	F.T. Island	"To The Light"	13	1
2014-11-01	Got7	"Around The World"	4	4
2014-11-08	Apink	"No No No"	6	2
2014-11-08	BigBang's Daesung	"Narubakisun (Look At Me, Gwisun)"	56	3
2014-11-15	Tritops	"Aitai"	35	1
2014-11-22	TVXQ/Tohoshinki	"Time Works Wonders"	1	8
2014-11-22	CODE-V	"Never Ending Story"	38	1
2014-11-22	NU'EST	"Shalala Ring"	44	1
2014-11-29	BtoB	"WOW"	12	1
2014-11-29	B2ST	"Kimi Wa Dou?"	23	1
2014-12-06	Infinite F	"Koi No Signs"	11	2
2014-12-20	BoA	"Fly"	80	1
2014-12-27	VIXX	"Error"	18	1
2015
2015-01-03	Super Junior	"Mamacita"	20	2
2015-01-03	F.Cuz	"Mou Ichido Dake (Remind)"	30	2
2015-01-03	G-Dragon & Taeyang	"Good Boy"	45	2
2015-01-03	U-KISS	"Sweetie"	60	2
2015-01-17	Infinite	"Dilemma"	7	1
2015-01-31	Cross Gene	"Future"	37	1
2015-02-07	JYJ	"Wake Me Tonight"	3	4
2015-02-07	B1A4	"Shiroi Kiseki"	4	1
2015-02-07	Block B	"Very Good"	7	2
2015-02-14	2PM	"Guilty Love"	1	3
2015-02-28	TVXQ/Tohoshinki	"Sakuramichi"	2	12
2015-02-28	Apink	"Mr. Chu"	5	3
2015-03-07	CODE-V	"Spring Love"	86	1
2015-03-14	AOA	"Like a Cat"	10	1
2015-03-21	Choushinsei	"Kitto"	8	1
2015-03-21	2PM's Wooyoung	"R.O.S.E"	9	1
2015-03-28	Shinee	"Your Number"	3	2
2015-04-11	BtoB	"Ashita"	2	1
2015-04-25	CNBLUE	"White"	5	3
2015-05-09	Girls' Generation	Catch Me If You Can	9	3
2015-05-16	Infinite	"24 Jikan"	4	2
2015-06-06	Kara	"Summer☆gic"	4	3
2015-06-13	Block B	"Her"	10	1
2015-06-13	BigBang	"Loser"	42	2 (R) 4
2015-06-13	Apink	"Luv"	53	1
2015-06-13	NU'EST	"Na.Na.Na"	61	1
2015-06-13	BigBang	"Bae Bae"	69	2
2015-06-20	BigBang	"We Like 2 Party"	27	4
2015-06-20	Exo	"Love Me Right"	33	3
2015-06-27	Got7	"Love Train"	2	1
2015-06-27	BigBang	"Bang Bang Bang"	2	7 (R) 73
2015-07-25	Girls' Generation	"Party"	10	5
2015-07-25	BigBang	"Sober"	24	2
2015-07-25	BigBang	"If You"	29	1 (R) 3
2015-07-25	Girls' Generation	"Check"	90	2
2015-08-01	2PM's Junho	"So Good"	43	1
2015-08-08	F.Cuz	"Two of Us"	23	1
2015-08-08	CODE-V	"Shoudou"	38	1
2015-08-08	f(x)	"Pinocchio (Danger)"	57	1
2015-08-08	Crayon Pop	"Rarirure"	94	1
2015-08-15	AOA	"Heart Attack"	9	1
2015-08-15	Muname	"Hello Again"	29	1
2015-08-22	Super Junior-K.R.Y.	"Join Hands"	29	1
2015-08-29	BigBang	"Let's Not Fall In Love"	82	2
2015-09-05	BtoB	"Natsuiro My Girl"	3	2
2015-09-05	U-KISS's Soohyun	"Kimi dake o"	94	1
2015-09-12	History	"Kieteshimatta My Love"	15	1
2015-09-12	Girls' Generation	"Lion Heart"	49	4
2015-09-26	VIXX	"Can't Say"	9	1
2015-09-26	U-KISS	"Stay Gold"	60	1
2015-10-03	F.T. Island	"Puppy"	6	3
2015-10-10	Got7	"Laugh Laugh Laugh"	3	1
2015-10-17	Girl's Day	"Darling"	22	1
2015-10-17	Donghae & Eunhyuk	"Let's Get It On"	44	1
2015-10-24	Cross Gene	"Love & Peace"	21	1
2015-10-24	Bastarz	"Hinkou Zero"	84	1
2015-10-31	2PM	"Higher"	2	3
2015-11-14	Shinee	"Sing Your Song"	5	2
2015-11-21	Exo	"Love Me Right (Romantic Universe)"	1	5
2015-11-28	Exo	"Lightsaber"	28	1 (R) 4
2015-11-28	Twice	"Like Ooh-Ahh"	27	35
2015-12-05	B1A4	"Happy Days"	8	1
2015-12-05	BTS	"I Need U"	4	1 (R) 5
2015-12-05	Changmin	"Into the Water"	66	3
2015-12-05	Yunho	"Burning Down"	71	5
2015-12-12	B2ST	"Saigo no Hitokoto"	52	1
2015-12-12	CODE-V	"Dancin' Circle"	63	1
2015-12-12	Bigflo	"1,2,3,4"	64	1
2015-12-26	Apink	"Sunday Monday"	19	1
2016
2016-01-02	BoA	"Lookbook"	98	2
2016-01-23	Super Junior	"Devil"	5	2
2016-02-13	F.Cuz	"Forever"	52	1
2016-02-27	Mr. Mr	"Just 1 Light"	26	1
2016-02-27	N.Flying	"Knock Knock"	49	1
2016-03-05	LU:KUS	"Break Ya"	23	1
2016-03-12	BtoB	"Dear Bride"	2	3
2016-03-12	Choushinsei	"Mata Kimi to..."	3	1
2016-03-12	Block B	"Jackpot"	7	1
2016-03-12	U-KISS	"Kissing to Feel"	8	1
2016-03-12	Taemin	"Press Your Number"	79	1
2016-04-02	BTS	"Run"	2	2 (R) 7
2016-04-09	Apink	"Brand New Days"	26	1
2016-04-09	B.I.G	"Taola"	62	1
2016-05-07	AOA feat. Takanori Nishikawa	"Give Me the Love"	6	3
2016-05-21	Twice	"Cheer Up"	23	36
2016-05-21	JJCC	"Ima Suguni"	85	1
2016-05-21	Bangtan Boys (BTS)	"Fire"	89	1
2016-05-28	CNBLUE	"Puzzle"	15	3
2016-05-28	BTS (see Bangtan Boys 2016-05-21)	"Fire"	30	2
2016-06-04	Shinee	"Kimi no Seide"	4	2
2016-06-11	Kyuhyun	"Celebration"	26	1
2016-06-18	Boyfriend	"Glider"	3	1
2016-06-25	Exo	"Monster"	9	6
2016-07-02	BtoB	"L.U.V"	1	2
2016-07-02	Block B	"Toy"	4	1
2016-07-16	VIXX	"Hana-Kaze"	3	1 (R) 3
2016-07-23	Kevin Woo	"Make Me"	30	1
2016-07-23	Se7en	"Rainbow"	46	1
2016-07-30	B.A.P	"Feel So Good"	14	1
2016-07-30	N.Flying	"Endless Summer"	66	1
2016-08-06	B2ST	"Freaking Cute"	92	1
2016-08-13	CODE-V	"Kimi to Ita Natsu"	58	1
2016-08-20	Apink	"Summer Time"	5	1
2016-08-20	AOA	"Good Luck"	9	1
2016-08-20	Taemin	"Goodbye (Sayonara Hitori)"	39	2
2016-08-27	Jang Keun-suk	"Darling Darling"	10	1
2016-08-27	5urprise	"Shake It Up"	83	1
2016-09-03	F.T. Island	"Just Do It"	20	1
2016-09-17	Mr. Mr.	"Rock This World"	59	1
2016-10-01	Jang Keun-suk	"Endless Summer"	17	1
2016-10-15	iKon	"Dumb & Dumber"	1	3
2016-10-22	Exo	"Coming Over"	3	5
2016-10-29	BTS	"Blood Sweat & Tears"	1	17 (R) 18
2016-11-05	Yesung	"Ame Nochi Hare no Sora no Iro"	11	2
2016-11-12	2PM	"Promise (I'll Be)"	4	2
2016-11-12	Twice	"TT"	3	112
2016-11-19	f(x)	"4 Walls"	90	1
2016-11-26	Blackpink	"Playing With Fire"	81	4
2016-12-03	U-Kiss	"Panic!"	10	1
2016-12-17	Mr. Mr.	"Good to Be Bad"	68	1
2016-12-24	B.A.P	"Fly High"	12	1
2016-12-31	BigBang	"Fxxk It"	7	6
2016-12-31	BigBang	"Last Dance"	9	5
2016-12-31	Jang Keun-suk	"I Wanna Hold Your Hand"	15	1
2016-12-31	BigBang	"Girlfriend"	22	1
2016-12-31	Shinee	"Winter Wonderland"	3	3
2017
2017-03-04	BTS	"Spring Day"	38	5
2017-03-11	Boyfriend	"I Miss You"	13	1
2017-03-11	Twice	"Knock Knock"	15	43
2017-03-04	BTS	"Not Today"	23	7
2017-03-25	Up10tion	"ID"	3	1
2017-03-25	B1A4	"You and I"	22	1
2017-04-15	Apink	"Bye Bye"	16	1
2017-04-15	Block B	"Yesterday"	17	1
2017-04-22	Myname	"Meeting you"	5	1
2017-05-13	B.A.P	"Wake Me Up"	11	1
2017-05-20	BtoB	"Movie"	4	1
2017-05-31	Monsta X	"Hero"	3	1
2017-06-03	Twice	"Signal"	4	42
2017-06-03	Blackpink	"Boombayah"	15	20
2017-06-10	GOT7	"My Swagger"	1	4
2017-06-10	iKON	"Bling Bling"	33	2
2017-06-10	iKON	"B-Day"	54	1
2017-06-17	Winner	"Fate Number For"	11	1
2017-06-24	Kim Hyun-joong	"Windmill"	12	1
2017-06-24	SF9	"Fanfare"	14	1
2017-06-24	Lee Chang-sub	"At the End"	39	1
2017-06-24	G-Dragon	"Untitled, 2014"	57	2
2017-07-08	Blackpink	"As If It's Your Last"	19	26
2017-07-15	Taemin	"Flame of Love"	60	1
2017-07-29	Red Velvet	"Red Flavor"	25	3
2017-08-05	Romeo	"Without U"	30	1
2017-08-05	Exo	"Ko Ko Bop"	39	4
2017-08-12	Apink	"Motto Go! Go!"	27	1
2017-08-19	SF9	"Easy Love"	12	1
2017-08-26	Girls' Generation	"Holiday"	31	2
2017-09-02	Monsta X	"Beautiful"	4	1
2017-09-02	F.T. Island	"Paradise"	17	1
2017-09-09	BtoB	"Brand New Days"	4	1
2017-09-23	Exo	"Power"	27	5
2017-09-30	Twice	"One More Time"	1 (Note: Peaked at No.1 on 2017-11-04 (1 week))	26
2017-10-07	BTS	"DNA"	5	62 (R) 83 (R) 84
2017-10-07	B.A.P	"Honeymoon"	18	1
2017-10-07	BTS	"Best of Me"	73	2
2017-10-14	U-Know	"Drop"	24	15
2017-10-21	BTS	"Go Go"	58	2
2017-10-28	U-Kiss	"Fly"	8	1
2017-10-28	TVXQ/Tohoshinki	"Why? (Keep Your Head Down)"	21	1 (R) 2
2017-10-28	KNK	"U"	26	1
2017-10-28	Trouble Maker	"Trouble Maker"	95	1
2017-10-28	TVXQ/Tohoshinki	"Reboot"	3	12
2017-11-04	Super Junior	"On and On"	36	1
2017-11-04	BTS	"Crystal Snow"	19	4
2017-11-04	BTS feat. Desiigner	"Mic Drop"	1 (Note: Peaked at No.1 on 2017-12-23 (1 week))	19
2017-11-04	Twice	"Luv Me"	38	3
2017-11-18	Twice	"Likey"	2	43 (R) 49
2017-11-25	Apink	"Orion"	15	1
2017-11-25	TVXQ/Tohoshinki	"Begin (Again Version)"	22	9
2017-11-25	Seventeen	"Clap"	50	2
2017-11-25	Super Junior	"Black Suit"	81	1
2017-12-09	Red Velvet	"Peek-A-Boo"	36	1
2017-12-30	Twice	"Heart Shaker"	4	25 (R) 28
2018
2018-01-03	Twice	"Candy Pop"	1 (Note: Peaked at No.1 on 2018-02-19 (1 week))	31
2018-01-06	Twice	"Merry & Happy"	54	1
2018-01-13	B.A.P	"Hands Up"	22	1
2018-01-20	Monsta X	"Spotlight"	2	3
2018-02-03	Up10tion	"Wild Love"	3	1
2018-02-03	Hoon	"Anniversary"	66	1
2018-02-03	Exo	"Electric Kiss"	23	2
2018-02-10	Red Velvet	"Bad Boy"	49	2
2018-02-10	Super Junior-D&E	"If You"	81	1
2018-02-10	iKON	"Love Scenario"	42	3
2018-02-17	B1A4	"Do You Remember"	12	1
2018-02-17	Twice	"Brand New Girl"	26	5
2018-02-24	Shinee	"From Now On"	14	9
2018-03-10	Momoland	"Bboom Bboom"	9	25
2018-03-10	J-Hope	"Daydream"	80	1
2018-03-17	BTS	"Don't Leave Me"	10	16
2018-03-17	Wanna One	"I Promise You (I.P.U.)"	78	1
2018-03-24	BigBang	"Flower Road"	10	2
2018-03-24	Got7	"Look"	22	4 (R) 6
2018-04-07	Twice	"What Is Love?"	6	35 (R) 58
2018-04-07	Twice	"Wake Me Up"	1 (Note: Peaked at No.1 on 2018-05-26 (1 week))	17
2018-04-07	Super Junior-D&E	"Lose It"	92	1
2018-04-28	BTS	"Let Go"	40	3
2018-05-05	Monsta X	"Jealousy"	52	2
2018-05-05	April	"TinkerBell"	90	1
2018-05-19	BTS	"Singularity"	34	2
2018-05-19	GOT7	"The New Era"	1 (Note: Peaked at No.1 on 2018-06-30 (1 week))	4
2018-05-19	Exo-CBX	"Horololo"	100	1
2018-05-26	BTS	"Fake Love"	1 (Note: Peaked at No.1 on 2018-11-17 (1 week))	38 (R) 48
2018-05-26	NCT 127	"Chain"	20	9
2018-06-02	SF9	"Mamma Mia!"	7	1
2018-06-02	BTS	"Anpanman"	33	7
2018-06-02	Jung Yong-hwa	"Letter"	54	1
2018-06-02	BTS	"Airplane Pt. 2"	25	5
2018-06-02	B1A4	"Aerumade"	88	1
2018-06-02	Jaejoong	"Sign"	2	12 (R) 14
2018-06-09	Shinee	"Good Evening"	26	1
2018-06-09	Seventeen	"Call Call Call!"	28	3
2018-06-23	Twice	"I Want You Back"	12	16
2018-06-23	Blackpink	"Ddu-Du Ddu-Du"	7	36
2018-06-23	Shinee	"I Want You"	47	3
2018-06-30	Blackpink	"Forever Young"	36	2
2018-07-07	100%	"Summer Night"	12	1
2018-07-07	Jaejoong	"Your Love"	24	2
2018-07-07	TVXQ/Tohoshinki	"Road"	2	9 (R) 10
2018-07-07	Taeyeon	"Stay"	68	2
2018-07-07	Shinee	"Our Page"	92	1
2018-07-07	Momoland	"Baam"	12	15
2018-07-14	KISEOP & Hoon	"Train"	32	1
2018-07-21	Twice	"Dance the Night Away"	5	19 (R) 26
2018-07-28	Seventeen	"Oh My!"	39	2
2018-08-04	Boyfriend	"Call Me"	10	1
2018-08-04	Shinee	"Sunny Side"	5	2
2018-08-04	Shinee	"Good Evening"	35	2
2018-08-11	iKON	"Killing Me"	61	2
2018-08-11	Monsta X	"Livin' It Up"	3	4
2018-08-11	TVXQ/Tohoshinki	"Jungle"	85	1
2018-08-18	Up10tion	"Chaser"	3	1
2018-08-25	Twice	"BDZ"	7	18
2018-08-25	Team H	"Summer Time"	30	2
2018-09-01	F.T. Island	"Pretty Girl"	26	1
2018-09-01	EXID	"Up & Down"	41	1
2018-09-01	BTS	"Idol"	11	21 (R) 32
2018-09-01	BTS feat. Nicki Minaj	"Idol"	47	2
2018-09-08	BTS	"I'm Fine"	36	3
2018-09-08	BTS	"Euphoria"	85	2
2018-09-15	Oh!GG	"Lil' Touch"	33	2
2018-09-15	Team H	"Summer Time"	41	1
2018-09-15	Team H	"Mature"	45	1
2018-09-22	Twice	"Be as One"	94	1
2018-09-22	Shinee	"Countless"	76	1
2018-09-01	Got7	"Lullaby"	94	1
2018-10-06	Kim Hyun-joong	"Wait for Me"	25	1
2018-10-06	Taemin	"Eclipse"	27	1
2018-10-06	ONF	"Complete"	65	1
2018-10-06	VIXX	"Reincarnation"	79	1
2018-10-13	Mamamoo	"Décalcomanie"	38	1
2018-10-13	Jaejoong	"Defiance"	3	1 (R) 12
2018-10-20	UKISS	"Scandal"	8	1
2018-10-20	GFriend	"Memoria"	13	1
2018-10-20	Taemin	"Mars"	44	2
2018-10-27	Jaejoong	"Lavender"	47	3 (R) 6
2018-11-03	Twice	"Stay by My Side"	23	2
2018-11-03	Steve Aoki feat. BTS	"Waste It on Me"	19	3
2018-11-03	TVXQ/Tohoshinki	"Jealous"	3	9
2018-11-03	Dua Lipa & Blackpink	"Kiss and Make Up"	90	2
2018-11-10	SF9	"Now or Never"	6	1
2018-11-10	Iz*One	"La Vie en Rose"	21	17
2018-11-10	Exo	"Tempo"	26	5
2018-11-17	Twice	"Yes or Yes"	5	31
2018-11-17	Supernova	"Chapter 2"	15	1
2018-11-24	Jennie	"Solo"	22	6
2018-12-01	TVXQ/Tohoshinki	"Daisuki Datta"	35	1
2018-12-01	Dreamcatcher	"What" (Japanese version)	55	1
2018-12-08	Super Junior & Reik	"One More Time (Otra Vez)"	15	1
2018-12-08	Red Velvet	"RBB (Really Bad Boy)"	93	2
2018-12-22	Exo	"Love Shot"	59	2
2018-12-22	Twice	"The Best Thing I Ever Did"	67	1
2019
2019-01-05	TVXQ/Tohoshinki	"Truth"	68	1
2019-02-09	Seventeen	"Home"	34	2
2019-02-09	Apeace	"Never Ever End"	37	1
2019-02-09	Iz*One	"Suki to Iwasetai"	2	7
2019-02-23	Mamamoo	"Wind Flower"	62	1
2019-02-23	Got7	"I Won't Let You Go"	63	1
2019-02-23	Pentagon	"Cosmo"	6	1
2019-02-23	Itzy	"Dalla Dalla"	31	9 (R) 11
2019-02-23	GFriend	"Sunrise"	50	1
2019-02-23	Taemin	"Want"	79	1
2019-03-02	Monsta X	"Alligator"	2	4 (R) 5
2019-03-16	Tomorrow X Together	"Crown"	23	4
2019-03-23	GFriend	"Flower"	35	1
2019-03-23	Jaejoong	"Sweetest Love"	35	12 (R) 18
2019-03-23	Dreamcatcher	"Piri (Fue o Fuke)" (Japanese version)	87	1
2019-03-23	Seventeen	"Happy Ending"	2	1 (R) 5
2019-03-30	Park Bo-gum	"Bloomin'"	11	2
2019-03-30	Kim Ryeo-wook	"Sakura no Hana ga Sakukoro"	76	1
2019-03-30	NCT 127	"Wakey-Wakey"	85	1 (R) 2
2019-04-06	Monsta X	"Shoot Out"	2	1
2019-04-06	Jaejoong	"Kimi Dake Ni Naru Mae Ni"	21	3
2019-04-06	Momoland	"I'm So Hot"	51	2 (R) 3
2019-04-06	Astro	"Hana Sake Mirai"	62	2
2019-04-13	Iz*One	"Violeta"	13	8
2019-04-13	Blackpink	"Kill This Love"	6	20 (R) 33
2019-04-13	Park Yoo-chun	"Slow Dance"	41	10
2019-04-20	BTS feat. Halsey	"Boy with Luv"	7	24 (R) 105
2019-04-20	Jun	"Phenomenal World"	44	1
2019-04-20	Jaejoong	"Impossible"	45	8 (R) 17
2019-04-20	Exo-CBX	"Paper Cuts"	47	1
2019-04-20	Blackpink	"Don't Know What to Do"	49	3
2019-04-27	BTS	"Mikrokosmos"	53	2
2019-04-27	BTS	"Make It Right"	54	3
2019-04-27	BTS	"Dionysus"	48	3
2019-04-27	BTS	"Home"	69	1
2019-04-27	BTS	"Jamais Vu"	95	1
2019-05-04	Twice	"Fancy"	4	35 (R) 57
2019-05-04	Jaejoong	"Keshou"	77	1
2019-05-18	BTS	"Lights"	1 (Note: Peaked at No.1 on 2019-07-13 (1 week))	1 (R) 21
2019-05-25	Supernova	"Bang"	19	1
2019-06-01	Got7	"Eclipse"	84	2
2019-06-01	Iz*One	"Buenos Aires"	1 (Note: Peaked at No.1 on 2019-07-06 (1 week))	2 (R) 6
2019-06-08	NCT 127	"Superhuman"	90	1
2019-06-29	Twice	"Breakthrough"	1 (Note: Peaked at No.1 on 2019-08-10 (1 week))	13 (R) 15
2019-06-29	Twice	"Happy Happy"	2	10
2019-07-13	BTS	"Boy with Luv" (Japanese version)	17	5
2019-07-13	BTS	"Heartbeat"	83	1
2018-07-20	Tohoshinki	"Mirrors"	46	1 (R) 2
2019-08-10	Taemin	"Famous"	35	3 (R) 4
2019-08-10	TVXQ/Tohoshinki	"Hot Hot Hot"	4	3
2019-08-10	Produce X 101	"To My World"	72	1
2019-08-10	Produce X 101	"Boyness"	73	1
2019-08-10	Produce X 101	"Dream for You"	79	1
2019-08-17	Itzy	"Icy"	34	15 (R) 17
2019-08-24	Oneus	"Twilight"	17	1
2019-08-24	Seventeen	"Hit"	20	3
2019-08-31	Pentagon	"Happiness"	6	1
2019-08-31	Jaejoong	"Mirai Yosouzu2"	31	13 (R) 19
2019-09-07	X1	"Flash"	25	6
2019-09-07	Jaejoong	"First Love"	56	1 (R) 11
2019-09-14	Iz*One	"Vampire"	1 (Note: Peaked at No.1 on 2019-10-12 (1 week))	5
2019-09-21	SF9	"RPM"	6	1
2019-09-21	Kim Hyun-joong	"This Is Love"	44	1
2019-09-28	Seventeen	"Fear"	24	3
2019-10-05	Twice	"Feel Special"	4	73 (R) 75
2019-10-12	SuperM	"Jopping"	27	4
2019-10-19	Exo	"Bird"	42	1
2019-10-26	Twice	"Fake & True"	19	3 (R) 6
2019-10-26	TVXQ/Tohoshinki	"Guilty"	92	1
2019-11-09	Monsta X	"Follow"	68	2
2019-11-23	N.Flying	"Doll"	82	1
2019-12-07	Exo	"Obsession"	33	8
2019-12-07	Mamamoo	"Hip"	39	30 (R) 31
2019-12-14	Jaejoong	"Chicken Rice"	66	1
2019-12-28	Oneus	"808"	15	1

== 2020–present ==
Chart date	Artist	Title	Peak position	Weeks
2020
2020-01-18	EXID	"Bad Girl for You"	95	1
2020-01-18	Jaejoong	"Ray of Light"	41	5
2020-01-25	Tomorrow X Together	"9 and Three Quarters (Run Away)"	4	5
2020-01-25	BTS	"Black Swan"	31	9
2020-01-25	TVXQ/Tohoshinki	"Manazashi"	6	3
2020-02-01	Jaejoong	"Brava!! Brava!! Brava!!"	5	3 (R) 8 (R) 16
2020-02-15	Twice	"Swing"	42	2
2020-02-15	Everglow	"Dun Dun"	61	2
2020-02-15	Jaejoong	"Ray of Light"	31	6 (R) 9
2020-02-15	Stray Kids	"My Pace"	90	1
2020-02-22	Iz*One	"Fiesta"	6	7
2020-02-29	BTS	"On"	8	24
2020-03-07	BTS	"Friends" (V, Jimin)	55	1
2020-03-14	NCT 127	"Kick It"	84	2
2020-03-21	Itzy	"Wannabe"	23	19 (R) 27
2020-03-21	Seventeen	"Fallin' Flower"	1 (Note: Peaked at No.1 on 2020-04-11 (1 week))	1 (R) 9
2020-04-18	Changmin	"Chocolate"	38	2
2020-04-18	Monsta X	"Wish on the Same Sky"	7	1
2020-05-16	IU feat. Suga	"Eight"	25	3
2020-05-16	Astro	"Knock"	54	2
2020-05-30	NCT 127	"Punch"	32	2
2020-05-30	Tomorrow X Together	"Can't You See Me?"	43	1
2020-05-30	I.O.I	"Very Very Very"	80	1
2020-06-06	Baekhyun	"Candy"	32	1
2020-06-06	Monsta X	"Fantasia"	81	1
2020-06-06	Lady Gaga and Blackpink	"Sour Candy"	43	3 (R) 4
2020-06-13	Twice	"More & More"	3	20
2020-06-13	Stray Kids	"Top"	8	2
2020-06-27	SF9	"Good Guy"	13	1
2020-06-27	Iz*One	"Secret Story of the Swan"	14	4
2020-06-27	Twice	"Fanfare"	1 (Note: Peaked at No.1 on 2020-07-18 (1 week))	19
2020-06-27	BTS	"Stay Gold"	12	61
2020-07-04	Blackpink	"How You Like That"	8	22
2020-07-04	Seventeen	"Left & Right"	50	3
2020-07-25	BTS	"Your Eyes Tell"	8	4 (R) 17
2020-08-15	Treasure	"Boy"	46	2 (R) 3
2020-08-22	Tomorrow X Together	"Drama"	4	2
2020-08-22	Park Bo-gum	"All My Love"	89	1
2020-08-22	SuperM	"100"	35	2
2020-08-29	BTS	"Dynamite"	2	138 (R) 139 (R) 140 (R) 141
2020-08-29	Itzy	"Not Shy"	18	11
2020-09-05	Seventeen	"247"	23	1 (R) 3
2020-09-05	Blackpink and Selena Gomez	"Ice Cream"	22	11
2020-09-12	Twice	"Stuck in My Head"	59	1
2020-09-12	SuperM	"Tiger Inside"	69	1
2020-09-19	Shaun	"Way Back Home"	97	1
2020-10-03	Hwasa	"Maria"	79	2
2020-10-10	Blackpink	"Lovesick Girls"	12	11 (R) 12
2020-10-10	SuperM	"One (Monster & Infinity)"	54	1
2020-10-17	Iz*One	"Beware"	75	2
2020-10-17	Blackpink feat. Cardi B	"Bet You Wanna"	99	1
2020-10-24	NCT	"Make a Wish (Birthday Song)"	52	5
2020-10-31	Seventeen	"Home;Run"	40	2
2020-10-31	Stray Kids	"All In"	67	4
2020-11-07	Twice	"I Can't Stop Me"	5	27 (R) 28
2020-11-07	Tomorrow X Together	"Blue Hour"	57	1
2020-11-07	Super Junior-K.R.Y.	"Traveler"	58	1
2020-11-07	Mamamoo	"Dingga"	58	2 (R) 5
2020-11-21	Twice	"Better"	3	7
2020-11-21	Taemin	"Idea"	71	1
2020-11-28	BTS	"Life Goes On"	10	23 (R) 29
2020-11-28	BTS	"Blue & Grey"	52	3 (R) 4
2020-11-28	BTS	"Fly to My Room"	42	3
2020-12-05	Super Junior-D&E	"Wings"	57	1
2020-12-05	BTS	"Telepathy"	76	1
2020-12-05	BTS	"Stay"	85	1
2020-12-05	BTS	"Dis-ease"	86	1
2020-12-05	TVXQ/Tohoshinki	"Small Talk"	96	1
2020-12-12	Enhypen	"Given-Taken" (Note: Japanese version re-entered chart at No. 3 on 2021-07-17)	3	1 (R) 3
2020-12-19	Iz*One	"Panorama"	3	6
2021
2021-01-02	Monsta X	"Love Killa"	36	1
2021-01-02	Twice	"Cry for Me"	87	1
2021-01-23	Tomorrow X Together	"Force"	50	1 (R) 2
2021-01-23	Treasure	"My Treasure"	54	1
2021-02-06	NCT 127	"First Love"	71	1
2021-02-06	Treasure	"Beautiful"	58	1 (R) 2
2021-03-06	Shinee	"Don't Call Me"	98	1
2021-03-20	Monsta X	"Wanted"	24	1
2021-03-20	Jang Keun-suk	"Star"	92	1
2021-03-27	Rosé	"On the Ground"	50	3
2021-04-10	BTS	"Film Out"	2	30
2021-04-10	Jaejoong produced by Hyde	"Breaking Dawn" (Japanese version)	15	1
2021-04-24	Seventeen	"Not Alone"	1 (Note: Peaked at No.1 on 2021-05-01 (1 week))	5 (R) 7
2021-05-01	Twice	"Kura Kura"	3	11
2021-05-08	Enhypen	"Drunk-Dazed"	44	2
2021-05-08	Itzy	"Mafia in the Morning"	36	5
2021-05-22	NCT Dream	"Hot Sauce"	44	1
2021-05-29	BTS	"Butter"	1 (total 4 weeks) (Note: Peaked at No.1 on 2021-06-05 (2 weeks), returned to No.1 on 2021-07-10 (2 weeks))	85
2021-05-29	Jang Keun-suk	"Emotion"	30	2
2021-05-29	Aespa	"Next Level"	77	1
2021-06-05	Shinee	"Superstar"	64	1
2021-06-12	Tomorrow X Together feat. Seori	"0X1=Lovesong (I Know I Love You)"	37	1 (R) 3
2021-06-19	Twice	"Alcohol-Free"	19	9 (R) 10
2021-06-19	Exo	"Don't Fight the Feeling"	77	1
2021-07-03	Seventeen	"Ready to Love"	38	2
2021-07-10	Twice	"Perfect World"	24	9
2021-07-10	NCT Dream	"Hello Future"	89	1
2021-07-17	BTS	"Permission to Dance"	1 (Note: Peaked at No.1 on 2021-07-31 (1 week))	70
2021-08-07	Ateez	"Dreamers"	24	1
2021-08-14	Jang Keun-suk	"Amagoi"	31	1
2021-08-28	Tomorrow X Together	"Loser=Lover"	56	2
2021-08-28	Red Velvet	"Queendom"	77	1
2021-09-04	Jang Keun-suk	"Day by Day"	32	4
2021-09-04	Stray Kids	"Thunderous"	66	3
2021-09-15	Lisa	"Lalisa"	26	5
2021-10-02	Coldplay & BTS	"My Universe	3	13
2021-10-02	NCT 127	"Sticker"	55	1
2021-11-13	NCT 127	"Favorite (Vampire)"	56	1
2021-10-09	Twice	"The Feels"	3	54
2021-10-09	Itzy	"Loco"	46	3
2021-10-16	Stray Kids	"Scars"	2	3
2021-10-16	Aespa	"Savage"	60	2 (R) 15
2021-10-23	Enhypen	"Tamed-Dashed" (Note: Japanese version re-entered chart at No. 1 on 2022-05-14)	1	2 (R) 4
2021-10-30	Loona	"Hula Hoop"	38	1
2021-10-30	Seventeen	"Rock with You"	25	3
2021-10-30	Stray Kids	"Call"	93	1
2021-11-13	Tomorrow X Together	"Ito"	53	2
2021-11-27	Twice	"Scientist"	25	7 (R) 10
2021-12-04	Jin	"Yours"	66	1
2021-12-11	Seventeen	"Power of Love"	2	3 (R) 4
2021-12-11	Ive	"Eleven"	9	23 (R) 29 (R) 30 (R) 31
2021-12-25	Twice	"Doughnut"	6	2
2021-12-25	NCT U	"Universe (Let's Play Ball)"	61	1
2022
2022-01-15	Kep1er	"Wa Da Da"	8	25 (R) 26
2022-01-15	Got the Beat	"Step Back"	69	9
2022-01-22	V	"Christmas Tree"	29	1
2022-01-22	Enhypen	"Blessed-Cursed"	32	2
2022-02-05	Golden Child	"A Woo!!"	85	1
2022-02-26	Jungkook	"Stay Alive"	44	2
2022-02-26	Treasure	"Jikjin"	21	2 (R) 4
2022-03-05	Enhypen	"Always"	4	3
2022-03-05	Nmixx	"O.O"	42	11
2022-03-26	Jang Keun-suk	"Blooming"	100	1
2022-03-26	Stray Kids	"Maniac"	21	2 (R) 4
2022-04-02	Treasure	"Darari"	40	6
2022-04-02	Red Velvet	"Feel My Rhythm"	47	2
2022-04-09	NCT Dream	"Glitch Mode"	35	1
2022-04-09	Treasure	"U"	73	1
2022-04-09	Jang Keun-suk	"Toki o Kakete"	89	6
2022-04-16	BigBang	"Still Life"	7	3
2022-04-16	Itzy	"Voltage"	16	1
2022-04-16	Ive	"Love Dive"	8	28 (R) 30
2022-04-23	Seventeen	"Darl+ing"	15	5
2022-05-07	Ha Sung-woon & Jimin	"With You"	72	1
2022-05-14	Le Sserafim	"Fearless"	1 (Note: Peaked at No.1 on 2023-02-04 (1 week))	17 (R) 20 (R) 25
2022-05-14	Psy feat. Suga	"That That"	14	6
2022-05-21	Tomorrow X Together	"Good Boy Gone Bad"	3	2 (R) 4
2022-06-04	Seventeen	"Hot"	49	1
2022-06-11	NCT Dream	"Beatbox"	55	7
2022-06-11	Stray Kids	"Your Eyes"	72	4
2022-06-18	BTS	"Yet to Come"	1 (Note: Peaked at No.1 on 2022-06-25 (1 week))	11
2022-06-18	Stray Kids	"Circus"	47	3
2022-06-25	BTS	"Born Singer"	65	1
2022-06-25	BTS	"For Youth"	67	1
2022-07-02	Jaejoong & Xia	"Rokutousei"	10	1
2022-07-02	Charlie Puth & Jungkook	"Left and Right"	13	8
2022-07-02	Kep1er	"Up!"	25	6
2022-07-02	Nayeon	"Pop!"	5	22
2022-07-09	Aespa	"Life's Too Short"	91	3
2022-07-16	Enhypen	"Future Perfect (Pass the Mic)"	28	1 (R) 2
2022-07-16	Aespa	"Girls"	30	5
2022-07-23	Twice	"Celebrate"	10	13 (R) 15
2022-07-30	Seventeen	"_World"	20	3
2022-07-30	Itzy	"Sneakers"	62	2
2022-08-13	Benny Blanco, BTS & Snoop Dogg	"Bad Decisions"	33	5
2022-08-13	Jang Keun-suk	"Beautiful"	47	1 (R) 2
2022-08-13	Kep1er	"Wing Wing"	81	1
2022-08-20	Girls' Generation	"Forever 1"	56	1 (R) 2
2022-08-27	Blackpink	"Pink Venom"	10	10
2022-08-27	Jang Keun-suk	"Goes On"	95	2
2022-09-03	Ive	"After Like"	13	17 (R) 23
2022-09-03	Twice	"Talk That Talk"	7	17 (R) 20
2022-09-03	Tomorrow X Together	"Ring"	53	2
2022-09-10	NewJeans	"Hype Boy"	41	1 (R) 5 (R) 25 (R) 27 (R) 28 (R) 29 (R) 30 (R) 31 (R) 32
2022-09-24	Blackpink	"Shut Down"	15	7
2022-10-01	NCT 127	"2 Baddies"	45	1
2022-10-01	Nmixx	"Dice"	56	4
2022-10-08	Loona	"Luminous"	41	1
2022-10-15	Itzy	"Blah Blah Blah"	11	1
2022-10-15	Treasure	"Hello"	43	2 (R) 4
2022-10-15	Stray Kids	"Case 143"	14	27
2022-10-22	Enhypen	"Make the Change"	55	2
2022-10-29	Le Sserafim	"Antifragile"	12	38 (R) 39
2022-10-29	CNBLUE	"Let It Shine"	95	1
2022-11-05	Jin	"The Astronaut"	4	3 (R) 4
2022-11-05	(G)I-dle	"Nxde"	95	1
2022-11-19	Seventeen	"Dream"	27	2
2022-12-03	Jungkook	"Dreamers"	6	5
2022-12-03	STAYC	"Poppy"	99	1
2022-12-31	NewJeans	"Ditto"	9	47 (R) 73 (R) 79 (R) 80
2022-12-31	NCT Dream	"Candy"	63	1
2023
2023-01-14	NewJeans	"OMG"	7	41 (R) 42 (R) 52 (R) 53 (R) 55 (R) 59
2023-01-21	Taeyang feat. Jimin	"Vibe"	32	3
2023-01-28	Twice	"Moonlight Sunrise"	5	13
2023-01-28	Shingo Katori × Seventeen	"Betting"	31	1 (R) 2
2023-02-04	Momo, Sana & Mina	"Bouquet"	32	2
2023-02-11	Treasure	"Here I Stand"	1 (Note: Peaked at No.1 on 2023-04-08 (1 week))	2 (R) 4
2023-02-11	Tomorrow X Together	"Sugar Rush Ride"	27	2 (R) 3
2023-02-11	Stray Kids	"The Sound"	34	2
2023-02-11	TVXQ/Tohoshinki	"Parallel Parallel"	35	1
2023-02-11	NCT 127	"Ay-Yo"	92	1
2023-02-18	BSS feat. Lee Young-ji	"Fighting"	1	5
2023-02-18	NCT Dream	"Best Friend Ever"	3	2
2023-03-11	Kep1er	"I Do! Do You?"	3	1 (R) 2
2023-03-18	Twice	"Set Me Free"	16	12
2023-03-18	J-Hope with J. Cole	"On the Street"	75	1
2023-03-25	Stray Kids	"There"	54	1
2023-03-25	Jimin	"Set Me Free Pt. 2"	59	2
2023-04-01	Ateez	"Limitless"	6	1 (R) 2
2023-04-01	Jimin	"Like Crazy"	43	3
2023-04-08	Ive	"Kitsch"	37	8 (R) 9
2023-04-15	STAYC	"Teddy Bear"	45	1
2023-04-15	NewJeans	"Zero"	58	1
2023-04-15	Jisoo	"Flower"	45	4
2023-04-22	Ive	"I Am"	10	18
2023-04-22	Say Yes!	"Say My Name"	77	1
2023-04-22	Agust D feat. IU	"People Pt. 2"	99	1
2023-04-29	Agust D	"Haegeum"	66	2
2023-05-06	Seventeen	"Super"	7	10 (R) 11
2023-05-06	Boys Planet	"Jelly Pop"	99	1
2023-05-13	Le Sserafim feat. Nile Rodgers	"Unforgiven"	10	22 (R) 27
2023-05-20	BTS	"The Planet"	40	2
2023-05-20	Ive	"Wave"	62	1 (R) 3
2023-05-20	Aespa	"Spicy"	64	7
2023-05-20	Twice	"Hare Hare"	3	14
2023-05-27	(G)I-dle	"Queencard"	47	13 (R) 14
2023-06-03	Enhypen	"Bite Me"	3	2 (R) 4
2023-06-03	Le Sserafim	"Eve, Psyche & the Bluebeard's Wife"	22	18
2023-06-03	NLE Choppa, Kodak Black, Jimin, Jvke & Muni Long	"Angel Pt. 1"	80	1 (R) 2
2023-06-10	Stray Kids	"S-Class"	8	11
2023-06-17	BTS	"Take Two"	6	5
2023-07-01	MiSaMo	"Marshmallow"	57	1
2023-07-01	NCT Dream	"Broken Melodies"	83	1
2023-07-08	TVXQ/Tohoshinki	"Lime & Lemon"	40	1
2023-07-08	Treasure	"Move (T5)"	56	2
2023-07-15	Cravity	"Groovy"	15	1
2023-07-15	Jungkook	"Still with You"	30	1
2023-07-15	Jungkook	"My You"	37	1
2023-07-15	Tomorrow X Together	"Hydrangea Love"	51	1
2023-07-15	NewJeans	"Super Shy"	10	20 (R) 23
2023-07-22	Jungkook	"Seven"	2	66
2023-07-22	Zerobaseone	"In Bloom"	22	1
2023-07-22	NewJeans	"New Jeans"	46	7
2023-07-22	Misamo	"Do Not Touch"	58	5
2023-07-29	NCT Dream	"ISTJ"	51	1
2023-07-29	NewJeans	"ETA"	8	17 (R) 23 (R) 26
2023-07-29	NewJeans	"Cool with You"	43	5
2023-08-05	NewJeans	"ASAP"	79	1
2023-08-12	Treasure	"Bona Bona"	14	1 (R) 3
2023-08-12	Blossom	"Enhypen"	75	1
2023-08-12	Le Sserafim	"Jewelry"	81	1
2023-08-19	Stray Kids	"Super Bowl"	56	2
2023-08-19	V	"Love Me Again"	76	2
2023-08-19	V	"Rainy Days"	91	1
2023-08-26	Seventeen	"Sara Sara"	32	2
2023-09-02	Le Sserafim feat. Nile Rodgers, Ado	"Unforgiven" (Japanese ver.)	6	3
2023-09-02	Junho	"Can I"	13	1
2023-09-02	Seventeen	"Ima (Even If the World Ends Tomorrow)"	30	2
2023-09-09	Stray Kids feat. Lisa	"Social Path"	27	2
2023-09-16	V	"Slow Dancing"	26	5 (R) 6
2023-09-16	Riize	"Get a Guitar"	98	1
2023-09-16	V	"Blue"	100	1
2023-10-07	Jungkook feat. Jack Harlow	"3D"	7	12
2023-10-07	Jang Geun-suk	"Shock"	49	1
2023-10-07	Ive	"Either Way"	80	1
2023-10-07	Kep1er	"Galileo"	96	1
2023-10-21	NCT 127	"Fact Check"	33	2
2023-10-21	Jennie	"You & Me"	36	3
2023-10-21	Seo In-guk	"Dont' Be Jealous"	80	1
2023-10-28	Ive	"Baddie"	21	6
2023-10-28	Tomorrow X Together	"Chasing That Feeling"	54	1
2023-11-04	Seventeen	"God of Music"	14	4
2023-11-04	The Kid Laroi, Jungkook & Central Cee	"Too Much"	95	1
2023-11-11	Le Sserafim	"Perfect Night"	7	35
2023-11-11	Jungkook	"Standing Next to You"	12	13 (R) 14
2023-11-18	Stray Kids	"Lalalala"	9	5
2023-11-18	Zerobaseone	"Crush"	65	1
2023-11-25	Aespa	"Drama"	34	4 (R) 5
2023-12-02	Kep1er	"Grand Prix"	6	1
2023-12-02	Enhypen	"Sweet Venom"	33	1
2023-12-02	Le Sserafim	"Dress Code"	65	1
2023-12-09	N.SSign	"New Star"	17	1
2023-12-09	Babymonster	"Batter Up"	100	1
2023-12-16	STAYC	"Lit"	93	1
2023-12-23	Twice	"Dance Again"	77	1
2023-12-30	Jimin	"Closer Than This"	84	1
2024
2024-01-20	Riize	"Love 119"	52	1 (R) 3
2024-02-03	IU	"Love Wins All"	80	1
2024-02-10	(G)I-dle	"Super Lady"	49	3
2024-02-17	Twice	"I Got You"	23	6
2024-03-02	Le Sserafim	"Easy"	17	13
2024-03-09	Ateez	"Not Okay"	4	2
2024-03-09	Twice	"One Spark"	18	13
2024-03-16	Le Sserafim	"Smart"	46	8
2024-03-23	V	"Fri(end)s"	38	3
2024-03-23	Zerobaseone	"Yura Yura (Unmei no Hana)"	3	5
2024-04-06	Illit	"Magnetic"	3	48 (R) 55
2024-04-06	NCT Dream	"Smoothie"	57	1
2024-04-13	Tomorrow X Together	"Deja Vu"	28	2
2024-04-13	Babymonster	"Sheesh"	42	13
2024-04-20	Stray Kids	"Why?"	25	2
2024-04-27	Riize	"Impossible"	66	2
2024-05-04	Illit	"Lucky Girl Syndrome"	95	1 (R) 2
2024-05-11	Seventeen	"Maestro"	17	4
2024-05-11	Ive	"Heya"	32	4
2024-05-11	Zico feat. Jennie	"Spot!"	69	2
2024-05-18	Stray Kids	"Lose My Breath"	27	3
2024-05-25	Itzy	"Algorhythm"	16	1
2024-05-25	Aespa	"Supernova"	25	21 (R) 33
2024-05-25	Zerobaseone	"Feel the Pop"	62	2
2024-06-01	NewJeans	"How Sweet"	14	14
2024-06-01	Ive	"Accendio"	85	1
2024-06-08	NewJeans	"Bubble Gum"	40	7
2024-06-08	Glay & Jay (Enhypen)	"Whodunit"	55	1
2024-06-08	Treasure	"King Kong"	3	1 (R) 5
2024-06-08	Aespa	"Armageddon"	63	4
2024-06-15	NCT Dream	"Moonlight"	2	2
2024-06-15	Cravity	"Show Off"	23	1
2024-06-15	Jungkook	"Never Let Go"	33	3
2024-06-22	Nayeon	"ABCD"	25	7
2024-06-29	JxW	"Last Night" (guitar by Park Ju-won)	3	1
2024-06-29	NewJeans	"Supernatural"	7	14
2024-06-29	Riize	"Boom Boom Bass"	41	2
2024-07-06	NewJeans	"Right Now"	47	2
2024-07-13	Be:First X Ateez	"Hush-Hush"	1	3
2024-07-13	Tomorrow X Together	"We'll Never Change"	2	3 (R) 5 (R) 6 (R) 7
2024-07-13	Aespa	"Hot Mess"	6	3 (R) 4
2024-07-13	Lisa	"Rock-Star"	74	1
2024-07-13	Jimin feat. Loco	"Smeraldo Garden Marching Band"	77	1
2024-07-13	Babymonster	"Forever"	92	1
2024-07-20	BoyNextDoor	"One and Only"	4	2
2024-07-20	Twice	"Dive"	25	4
2024-07-27	Enhypen	"XO (Only If You Say Yes)"	35	1
2024-07-27	Stray Kids	"Chk Chk Boom"	12	6
2024-07-27	Jimin	"Who"	21	32 (R) 34 (R) 35 (R) 36 (R) 37 (R) 43
2024-08-03	Kara	"I Do I Do"	95	1
2024-08-17	Xikers	"Tsuki (Lunatic)"	48	1
2024-08-17	Key	"Tongue Tied"	55	1
2024-09-07	Zerobaseone	"Good So Bad"	39	3
2024-09-07	Le Sserafim	"Crazy"	3	22
2024-09-14	Riize	"Lucky"	2	2
2024-09-14	Ateez X Be:First	"Royal"	22	1
2024-09-21	BoyNextDoor	"Nice Guy"	53	1
2024-09-28	Yeonjun	"Ggum"	81	2
2024-10-12	Ateez	"Birthday"	4	2
2024-10-19	MiSaMo	"New Look"	8	19
2024-10-19	N.SSign	"Everblue"	40	1
2024-10-19	Stray Kids	"Night"	93	1
2024-10-19	Karina	"Up"	50	5
2024-10-26	Seventeen feat. DJ Khaled	"Love, Money, Fame"	24	2
2024-10-26	Jennie	"Mantra"	45	4
2024-10-26	Rosé & Bruno Mars	"Apt."	1 (total 5 weeks) (Note: Peaked at No.1 on 2024-11-23 (5 weeks))	52
2024-11-02	Aespa	"Whiplash"	7	52
2024-11-02	Illit	"Cherish (My Love)"	35	5
2024-11-02	Jin	"I'll Be There"	40	3
2024-11-09	MiSaMo	"Identity"	32	4
2024-11-16	Babymonster	"Drip"	26	26 (R) 28
2024-11-16	Tomorrow X Together	"Over the Moon"	30	2
2024-11-23	Enhypen	"No Doubt"	21	3
2024-11-23	Ive	"Supernova Love"	72	1
2024-11-23	Stray Kids	"Giant"	82	2
2024-11-23	Yuta	"Off the Mask"	99	1
2024-11-30	Jin	"Running Wild"	24	4
2024-12-07	Seventeen	"Shohikigen"	2	2 (R) 3 (R) 5
2024-12-07	G-Dragon feat. Taeyang & Daesung	"Home Sweet Home"	21	5
2024-12-07	Jin feat. Taka	"Falling"	41	1
2024-12-07	G-Dragon	"Power"	88	1
2024-12-14	TWS	"Last Festival"	7	1
2024-12-14	Twice feat. Megan Thee Stallion	"Strategy"	57	3
2024-12-21	Twice	"Strategy"	43	5
2024-12-21	Rosé	"Toxic Till the End"	32	5 (R) 9
2024-12-21	Treasure	"Last Night"	80	1
2024-12-28	Stray Kids	"Walkin on Water"	83	1
2025
2025-01-04	Twice	"The Wish"	79	1
2025-01-18	BoyNextDoor	"If I Say, I Love You"	25	6
2025-01-18	Lisa feat. Felix	"Reawaker"	56	2 (R) 3
2025-01-25	BSS	"CBZ (Prime Time)"	5	1
2025-01-25	Ive	"Rebel Heart"	44	7
2025-02-15	Ive	"Attitude"	48	6
2025-03-01	Illit	"Almond Chocolate"	13	1 (R) 19 (R) 28
2025-03-22	Hoshi X Woozi feat. So!Yoon!	"Pinocchio"	11	1
2025-03-22	Treasure	"Yellow"	22	4 (R) 5
2025-03-22	Jennie	"Like Jennie"	32	17
2025-03-22	J-Hope feat. Miguel	"Sweet Dreams"	81	1
2025-03-29	Le Sserafim	"Hot"	19	5
2025-04-05	Zerobaseone	"Blue"	88	1
2025-04-05	J-Hope	"Mona Lisa"	94	1
2025-04-12	Le Sserafim	"Come Over"	57	2
2025-05-10	Tomorrow X Together	"Love Language"	27	3
2025-05-24	Yuta	"Twisted Paradise"	19	1
2025-05-24	BoyNextDoor	"I Feel Good"	29	2
2025-05-31	Jin	"Don't Say You Love Me"	28	43
2025-05-31	Riize	"Fly Up"	85	1
2025-06-07	Seventeen	"Thunder"	12	5
2025-06-07	Tomorrow X Together	"Step by Step"	48	1
2025-06-14	Beomgyu	"Panic"	52	1
2025-06-14	Nayeon	"Kimagure Romantic"	92	1
2025-06-21	Le Sserafim	"Different"	2	8 (R) 9
2025-06-21	Stray Kids	"Hollow"	30	4
2025-06-21	Enhypen	"Bad Desire (With or Without You)"	95	1
2025-06-28	Illit	"Billyeoon Goyangi (Do the Dance)"	26	5 (R) 6
2025-06-28	J-Hope feat. GloRilla	"Killin' It Girl"	52	1
2025-07-05	Aespa	"Dirty Work"	4	6
2025-07-05	Hearts2Hearts	"Style"	79	2
2025-07-12	TWS	"Nice to See You Again"	1	3
2025-07-12	Babymonster	"Hot Sauce"	41	3
2025-07-19	Plave	"Hide and Seek"	1	1
2025-07-19	Blackpink	"Jump"	8	26 (R) 35
2025-07-19	Twice	"This Is For"	13	14
2025-07-19	Le Sserafim	"Kawaii"	52	1
2025-07-19	Enhypen	"Shine on Me"	2	6 (R) 7
2025-07-26	Xikers	"Up All Night"	51	1
2025-07-26	Ive	"Be Alright"	80	1 (R) 2
2025-08-02	Tomorrow X Together	"Beautiful Stranger"	14	3
2025-08-02	Huntrix	"Golden"	7	52
2025-08-09	Twice	"Enemy"	46	2
2025-08-30	BoyNextDoor	"Count to Love"	1	3
2025-08-30	Stray Kids	"Ceremony"	28	3
2025-09-06	Ive	"XOXZ"	31	4
2025-09-06	Twice	"Like 1"	59	1
2025-09-13	Illit	"Toki Yo Tomare"	4	3
2025-09-13	Treasure	"Paradise"	10	4
2025-09-13	Zerobaseone	"Iconik"	45	2
2025-09-20	Aespa	"Rich Man"	27	6
2025-09-20	Cortis	"What You Want"	87	1
2025-10-11	Saja Boys	"Soda Pop"	93	1
2025-10-25	TWS	"Overdrive"	45	1
2025-10-25	Babymonster	"We Go Up"	58	10
2025-11-01	Tomorrow X Together	"Can't Stop"	12	2
2025-11-01	BoyNextDoor	"Hollywood Action"	22	2
2025-11-01	Hearts2Hearts	"Focus"	100	1
2025-11-08	Le Sserafim	"Spaghetti"	3	11 (R) 14
2025-11-08	Tomorrow X Together	"Where Do You Go?"	49	1
2025-11-15	CNBLUE	"Shintōya"	68	1
2025-11-22	Yeonjun	"Talk to Me"	18	1
2025-11-22	Jisoo & Zayn	"Eyes Closed"	37	1
2025-11-22	BoyNextDoor	"Say Cheese!"	43	2
2025-11-29	Stray Kids	"Do It"	33	3
2025-12-06	Illit	"Not Cute Anymore"	16	6
2025-12-13	Alpha Drive One	"Formula"	36	2
2025-12-27	Riize	"Something's in the Water"	42	1
2026
2026-01-03	Zico & Lilas Ikuta	"Duet"	64	4
2026-01-24	Alpha Drive One	"Freak Alarm"	45	2
2026-01-31	Enhypen	"Knife"	46	1
2026-02-07	Tomorrow X Together feat. Hyde	"SSS (Sending Secret Signals)"	44	1
2026-02-14	MiSaMo	"Confetti"	85	2
2026-02-21	Ive	"Bang Bang"	21	8
2026-02-21	KiiiKiii	"404 (New Era)"	84	1
2026-02-28	Riize	"All of You"	3	2
2026-03-07	Ive	"Blackhole"	50	3
2026-03-07	Hearts2Hearts	"Rude!"	19	8
2026-03-14	Blackpink	"Go"	42	2
2026-03-14	N.SSign	"Feelin' Good"	51	1
2026-03-14	Seventeen	"Tiny Light"	69	1
2026-03-28	Cravity	"Blast Out"	12	1
2026-03-28	BTS	"Swim"	3	17
2026-03-28	BTS	"Body to Body"	17	8
2026-04-04	BTS	"Hooligan"	26	8
2026-04-04	BTS	"Fya"	39	5
2026-04-04	BTS	"Alien"	44	5
2026-04-04	BTS	"2.0"	10	13
2026-04-04	BTS	"Normal"	49	5
2026-04-04	BTS	"Merry Go Round"	55	4
2026-04-04	BTS	"One More Night"	62	1
2026-04-04	BTS	"Like Animals"	66	5
2026-04-04	BTS	"They Don't Know 'Bout Us"	75	1 (R) 2
2026-04-04	BTS	"Please"	77	1
2026-04-04	BTS	"Into the Sun"	84	1
2026-04-04	BTS	"No. 29"	95	1
2026-04-25	Tomorrow X Together	"Stick with You"	14	2
2026-04-25	Riize	"Kill Shot"	34	1
2026-05-09	Le Sserafim	"Celebration"	29	2
2026-05-09	TWS	"You, You"	51	1
2026-05-09	Illit	"It's Me"	7	29
2026-05-16	Cortis	"RedRed"	32	2 (R) 3
2026-05-16	Babymonster	"Choom"	33	7
2026-05-23	Yuta	"Play Back"	35	1
2026-05-23	Aespa	"WDA (Whole Different Animal)" feat. G-Dragon	56	3
2026-05-30	Zerobaseone	"Top 5"	73	1
2026-06-06	Le Sserafim	"Boompala"	15	4
2026-06-06	Alpha Drive One	"OMG!"	49	2
2026-06-13	Treasure	"If I"	11	3
2026-06-13	Aespa	"Lemonade"	23	12
2026-06-20	BTS	"Come Over"	19	3
2026-06-20	Babymonster	"Sugar Honey Ice Tea"	29	3
2026-06-27	Le Sserafim, Illit & Katseye	"Iconic by Mistake"	38	3
2026-07-04	Stray Kids	"Run It"	26	2
2026-07-04	Hearts2Hearts	"Lemon Tang"	99	1
2026-07-11	Oneus	"Under"	69	1
2026-07-11	Enhypen	"We'll Be Fine"	73	1
2026-07-25	Yeonjun	"Ice Cream"	30	1
2026-07-25	Ateez	"Bad"	3	18
2026-08-08	Illit feat. Jisoo, Momoka of Hana	"I Got Your Back"	2	9
2026-08-08	Aespa	"Kiss n Tell"	32	3
2026-08-08	Jennie	"Less Than a Lover"	60	2
2026-08-15	TWS	"Soda Soda"	1	1
2026-08-22	Hearts2Hearts	"Iconic Heart"	2	2
2026-08-22	Stray Kids	"This & That"	51	2
2026-08-29	Tomorrow X Together	"Setsuna Hanabi"	1	5
2026-08-29	BoyNextDoor	"Boom Boom Boom"	64	1
2026-08-29	BigBang	"Biiig"	77	2
2026-09-05	Riize	"Sunburst"	3	3 (R) 6
2026-09-05	Enhypen	"Bloody Paradise"	32	2
2026-09-05	Alpha Drive One	"Born Dire"	52	2
2026-09-12	F.T. Island	"Lemonade"	93	1
2026-09-26	Onew	"Kakera (Unmei no Piece)"	25	1
2026-09-26	Le Sserafim	"Made My Night"	21	4
2026-09-26	Jisoo	"Click"	39	1
2026-10-10	Rosé	"New Trick"	41	1
2026-10-10	BoyNextDoor	"Animal"	93	1
2026-10-24	A2O Lite	"Neon"	9	5
2026-10-31	Ive	"Looks Can Kill"	28	4
2026-11-07	Illit	"You're Under Arrest"	8	3
2026-11-07	Riize	"Insomnia"	30	1
2026-11-07	Babymonster	"Deserve"	79	1
2026-11-14	TWS	"Call My Name"	10	2
2026-11-14	Treasure	"Shock"	20	2
2026-11-14	Bestie	"Love Options"	43	2
2026-11-21	Stray Kids	"Suiatsu"	34	1

== See also ==
- List of K-pop on the Billboard charts
- List of K-pop albums on the Billboard charts
- List of K-pop songs on the Billboard charts
- List of K-pop on the Billboard year-end charts
- Timeline of K-pop at Billboard
- Timeline of K-pop at Billboard in the 2020s
- K-pop Hot 100
- List of K-pop artists
- List of South Korean idol groups
