= Top Secret (song) =

- CD-only cover

Single by F.T. Island
- Released: August 8, 2012
- Recorded: 2012
- Genre: Rock
- Length: 3:50
- Label: Warner Music Japan
- Songwriter: Kenichi Maeyamada

F.T. Island Japanese singles chronology
"Neverland" (2012)	"Top Secret" (2012)	"Polar Star" (2012)

"Top Secret" is a Japanese-language song by South Korean rock band F.T. Island. It is their eight single under Warner Music Japan and 11th single overall in Japan. The song was written by Kenichi Maeyamada and composed by Corin. It was released on August 8, 2012, in four editions: a CD-only edition, a first press edition, a tour venue edition, and Lawson edition. The single debuted at number six on the Oricon weekly chart, selling 34,000 copies in its first week.

== Composition ==
"Top Secret" was written by Kenichi Maeyamada and composed by Corin. "Beloved" was written by Gorō Matsui and composed by Lee Jae-jin and Suzuki "Daichi" Hideyuki. "Here" was written and composed by Nobuaki Hiraga. The lyrics begin "Kiken'na kaori.. (危険な香り dangerous scent)", and contain the refrain "Top Secret kimi dake daze".

F.T. Island stated that "Top Secret" was different from their previous singles. The song was described to be more on the adult and sexy side. On the lyrical content, lead singer Lee Hongki explained that the person in the song displayed "the image of the playboy who's good on love affairs and going out with many girls at the same time". The coupling tracks "Beloved" and "Here" were explained to be sorrowful and lonely songs; the former was classified as an energetic song, while the latter is slow-tempo, where the lyrics narrated a hopeful future. Guitarist Choi Jong-hoon compared the sound of "Beloved" to that of the English rock band Muse.

== Release and promotion ==
For the month of July 2012, "Top Secret" was used as the ending theme song for Nippon Television's music show Happy Music. "Top Secret" was released on August 8, 2012, in four editions: a CD-only edition which includes one of seven random trading cards; a Lawson edition which includes performance footage of "Satisfaction (Korean Version)", "Wanna Go", "Paper Plane", "Yuki", and "Stay" from the 20 (Twenty) album release event held at Zepp Tokyo on May 19, 2012, as well as a special feature of the event; a first press edition which includes the music video for "Top Secret", a special feature, and a clip of F.T. Island discussing the song; and the tour venue edition which includes footage performance footage of "Let It Go!", "I Hope", and "Flower Rock" from Mezamashi Live held in Odaiba on August 7, 2011.

F.T. Island held their first performance of "Top Secret" at Mezamashi Live in Odaiba on July 28, 2012.

== Chart performance ==
"Top Secret" debuted at number six on the Oricon weekly singles chart, selling 34,340 copies in its first week. On the issue dated August 20, 2012, the song debuted at number 14 on the Billboard Japan Hot 100.

== Track listing ==
All editions:
No.	Title	Lyrics	Music	Length
1.	"Top Secret"	Kenichi Maeyamada	Corin	3:50
2.	"Beloved"	Gorō Matsui	Lee Jae-jin, Suzuki "Daichi" Hideyuki	4:30
3.	"Here"	Nobuaki Hiraga	Hiraga	5:11
4.	"Top Secret" (Instrumental)		Corin	3:50
Total length:				17:20

Lawson edition
No.	Title	Length
1.	"Satisfaction (Korean Version)" (2nd Album 20 (Twenty) Release Event @Zepp Tokyo 2012.5.19)
2.	"Wanna Go" (2nd Album 20 (Twenty) Release Event @Zepp Tokyo 2012.5.19)
3.	"Paper Plane" (2nd Album 20 (Twenty) Release Event @Zepp Tokyo 2012.5.19)
4.	"Yuki" (2nd Album 20 (Twenty) Release Event @Zepp Tokyo 2012.5.19)
5.	"Stay" (2nd Album 20 (Twenty) Release Event @Zepp Tokyo 2012.5.19)
6.	"2nd Album 20 (Twenty) Release Event @Zepp Tokyo 2012.5.19" (special feature)

First press edition
No.	Title	Length
1.	"Top Secret" (music video)
2.	"Top Secret" (special feature)
3.	"F.T. Island talking about 'Top Secret'"

Tour venue edition
No.	Title	Length
1.	"Let It Go!" (Mezamashi Live @United States of Sun Sun Island, Odaiba Music Stadium 2011.8.7)
2.	"I Hope" (Mezamashi Live @United States of Sun Sun Island, Odaiba Music Stadium 2011.8.7)
3.	"Flower Rock" (Mezamashi Live @United States of Sun Sun Island, Odaiba Music Stadium 2011.8.7)

== Chart history ==
Chart (2012)	Peak position
Billboard Japan Hot 100	14
Oricon Weekly Chart	6
