= Master: Piece =

EP by Cravity
- Released: March 6, 2023
- Genre: K-pop
- Length: 19:58
- Language: Korean
- Label: Starship

Cravity chronology
New Wave (2022)	Master: Piece (2023)	Sun Seeker (2023)

Singles from Master: Piece
- 1. "Groovy" Released: March 6, 2023

Master: Piece is the fifth extended play by South Korean boy band Cravity. It was released on March 6, 2023, by Starship Entertainment and distributed by Kakao Entertainment. It was released alongside the music video for lead single "Groovy".

The album debuted at number two on the South Korean Circle Album Chart with sales of over 238,000 copies.

== Background ==
The EP includes four songs co-written by members Serim and Allen, namely "Fly", "Get Lifted", and "Baddie", as well as the lead single, "Groovy". Member Woobin has also participated in the album through his second self-produced song, "Light the way". In addition, WJSN's Exy has also participated through the lyrics of "A to Z".

== Promotion ==
On March 6, Cravity began the EP's promotion through a live comeback show with YouTube channel Zanmang Loopy, entitled CRAVITY COMEBACK SHOW in Jean Mang House. The group interacted through real-time communication with fans as well as discussing the EP's creation.

The group's promotion for the song "Groovy" on music show programs began on Mnet's M Countdown on March 9, 2023. The promotion continued on MBC's Music Core on March 11. Cravity also appeared on entertainment program Weekly Idol before capping off the first week of promotions through Sunmi's Show! Interview.

On April 3, Cravity successfully wrapped up the music broadcast promotion of their 5th mini-album, "Master: Piece, ending with a performance on SBS' 'Inkigayo', which aired on the 2nd of the month.

== Track listing ==
Master: Piece track listing
No.	Title	Lyrics	Music	Length
1.	"Groovy"	Yubin Hwang (VERYGOODS), 12h51m (VERYGOODS), Hyojeong Lee (VERYGOODS), Serim, Allen	Cage, Jimmy Claeson	3:22
2.	"Fly"	Hwaimhyeon (PNP), Serim, Allen	OLLIPOP, Gavin Jones, Ryan Lawrie	3:17
3.	"Get Lifted"	danke (lalala studio), Maryjane (lalala studio), Serim, Allen	STEREO14, Woongkim, David Simon	3:05
4.	"Baddie"	Woobin, Jang Dain (PNP), Serim, Allen	Ryan Jeon, Hanif Hitmanic Sabzevari, Dennis DeKo Kordenjad, Pontus Ljung, Jop Pangemanan, Rufio Hooks	3:28
5.	"A to Z"	Exy, Sohlhee	Ryan Jeon, David "Dwilly" Wilson, Colin Magalong, Wyatt Sanders	3:27
6.	"Light the way"	Woobin	Woobin, Saimon	3:19
Total length:				19:58

== Charts ==
=== Weekly charts ===
Weekly chart performance for Master: Piece
Chart (2023)	Peak position
Japanese Albums (Oricon)	18
Japanese Combined Albums (Oricon)	25
South Korean Albums (Circle)	2

=== Monthly charts ===
Monthly chart performance for Master: Piece
Chart (2023)	Peak position
Japanese Albums (Oricon)	42
South Korean Albums (Circle)	6

=== Year-end charts ===
Year-end chart performance for Master: Piece
Chart (2023)	Position
South Korean Albums (Circle)	73

== Certifications and sales ==
Certifications and sales for Master: Piece
Region	Certification	Sales
South Korea (KMCA)	Platinum	1 000 000
