= Polar Star (song) =

- CD-only cover

Single by F.T. Island
- Released: November 28, 2012
- Recorded: 2012
- Genre: Rock
- Length: 4:04
- Label: Warner Music Japan
- Songwriter: Hiroki Horiko

F.T. Island Japanese singles chronology
"Top Secret" (2012)	"Polar Star" (2012)	"You Are My Life" (2013)

"Polar Star" is a song by South Korean rock band F.T. Island. It is their ninth single under Warner Music Japan and 12th single overall in Japan. The song was written and composed by Hiroki Horiko. It was released on November 28, 2012, in three editions: a CD-only edition, and limited editions A and B. The single debuted at number four on the Oricon weekly chart, selling over 35,000 copies in its first week.

== Composition ==
"Polar Star" was written and composed by Hiroki Horiko. "Fallin' for You" was written by Lee Jae-jin and Kenn Kato, and composed by Lee. "Beautiful World" was written by Kato and composed by Choi Jong-hoon.

"Polar Star" was classified as a medium-tempo rock song that describes a love that never changes, similar to how the location of a pole star never changes. "Fallin' for You" is an acoustic rock song that "depicts a man who isn't able to get close to the woman he loves". Lee was inspired to write the melody from playing his acoustic guitar. "Beautiful World" is a rock ballad that incorporates the use of a piano, which was described as having a sound not previously heard from F.T. Island. Choi composed the melody while thinking of the lyrics, which describe how "a man looks on at his lovely lover".

== Release and promotion ==
"Polar Star" was released on November 28, 2012, in three editions: a CD-only edition which includes one of seven random trading cards; a limited edition A which includes the music video of the song and a special feature, and multi-angle performance footage of "Neverland" and "Stay" at the F.T. Island Summer Tour 2012: Run! Run! Run! that took place at Saitama Super Arena; and a limited edition B which includes performance footage of "Stay", "Paper Plane", "Life", "Neverland", "Boom Boom Boom", "Top Secret", "I Hope", and "Flower Rock" from Mezamashi Live held in the Odaiba My Beat Stadium on July 28, 2012.

"Polar Star" was used as the ending theme music for Nippon Television's music television program Oto Ryūmon: Music Dragon Gate and television comedy Futtonda for the month of November.

== Chart performance ==
"Polar Star" debuted at number four on the Oricon weekly singles chart, selling 35,260 copies in its first week. On the issue dated December 10, 2012, the song debuted at number 11 on the Billboard Japan Hot 100.

== Track listing ==
All editions:
No.	Title	Lyrics	Music	Length
1.	"Polar Star"	Hiroki Horiko	Horiko	4:04
2.	"Fallin' for You"	Lee Jae-jin, Kenn Kato	Lee	4:29
3.	"Beautiful World"	Kato	Choi Jong-hoon	4:32
4.	"Polar Star" (Instrumental)		Horiko	4:04
Total length:				17:09

Limited edition A
No.	Title	Length
1.	"Polar Star" (music video)
2.	"Polar Star" (special feature)
3.	"Neverland" (F.T. Island Summer Tour 2012: Run! Run! Run! @Saitama Super Arena multi-angle)
4.	"Stay" (F.T. Island Summer Tour 2012: Run! Run! Run! @Saitama Super Arena multi-angle)

Limited edition B
No.	Title	Length
1.	"Stay" (Mezamashi Live @United States of Sun Sun Island, Odaiba My Beat Stadium 2012.7.28)
2.	"Paper Plane" (Mezamashi Live @United States of Sun Sun Island, Odaiba My Beat Stadium 2012.7.28)
3.	"Life" (Mezamashi Live @United States of Sun Sun Island, Odaiba My Beat Stadium 2012.7.28)
4.	"Neverland" (Mezamashi Live @United States of Sun Sun Island, Odaiba My Beat Stadium 2012.7.28)
5.	"Boom Boom Boom" (Mezamashi Live @United States of Sun Sun Island, Odaiba My Beat Stadium 2012.7.28)
6.	"Top Secret" (Mezamashi Live @United States of Sun Sun Island, Odaiba My Beat Stadium 2012.7.28)
7.	"I Hope" (Mezamashi Live @United States of Sun Sun Island, Odaiba My Beat Stadium 2012.7.28)
8.	"Flower Rock" (Mezamashi Live @United States of Sun Sun Island, Odaiba My Beat Stadium 2012.7.28)

== Chart history ==
Chart (2012)	Peak position
Billboard Japan Hot 100	11
Oricon Weekly Chart	4
