= Distance (F.T. Island song) =

- Standard Edition cover

Single by F.T. Island

from the album 20 (Twenty)
- Released: November 30, 2011
- Recorded: 2011
- Genre: Rock
- Length: 5:16
- Label: Warner Music Japan
- Songwriters: Kenn Kato, Song Seunghyun, Lee Jaejin

F.T. Island Japanese singles chronology
| "Let It Go!" (2011) | "Distance" (2011) | "Neverland" (2012) |

"Distance" is a song by South Korean rock band F.T. Island. It is their sixth single under Warner Music Japan and ninth single overall in Japan. The song was written by Kenn Kato, Song Seunghyun and Lee Jaejin, and composed by Corin. It was released on November 30, 2011, in three editions: a Standard Edition, and Limited Edition Types A and B. The single debuted at number four on the Oricon weekly chart and at number eight on the Billboard Japan Hot 100. It went on to sell over 44,500 copies in Japan.

== Composition ==
"Distance" was written by Kenn Kato, Song Seunghyun and Lee Jaejin, and composed by Corin. "Life" and "Venus" were written by Lee Jaejin and Kenn Kato; the former was composed by Choi Jong-hoon, the latter by Lee Jaejin .

== Release and promotion ==
"Distance" was released on November 30, 2011, in three editions: a Standard Edition, a Limited Edition Type A which included footage from the band's Tour 2011 Summer Final "Messenger" at the Nippon Budokan, the music video for "Distance" and a special feature, and a Limited Edition Type B that included five covers, each designed by one band member.

In November, "Distance" was used as the theme song for the Japanese music program Happy Music.

== Chart performance ==
"Distance" debuted at number four on the weekly Oricon chart, selling 39,120 copies in its first week. The following week, "Distance" fell to number 39, selling 3,377 copies in its second week. It fell to number 46 and sold 2,055 copies in its third week. "Distance" went on to sale over 44,500 copies in Japan.^{a} On the issue dated December 12, 2011, the song debuted at number eight on the Billboard Japan Hot 100. On the Recording Industry Association of Japan (RIAJ) Digital Track Chart, the song debuted at number 33.

== Track listing ==
All editions:
| No. | Title | Lyrics | Music | Length |
|---|---|---|---|---|
| 1. | "Distance" | Kenn Kato, Song Seunghyun, Lee Jaejin | Corin | 5:16 |
| 2. | "Life" | Lee Jaejin, Kenn Kato | Choi Jong-hoon | 3:41 |
| 3. | "Venus" | Lee Jaejin, Kenn Kato | Lee Jaejin | 4:20 |
| 4. | "Distance" (Instrumental) | | Corin | 5:16 |
| Total length: | | | | 18:33 |

Type A
| No. | Title | Length |
|---|---|---|
| 1. | "Satisfaction (F.T. Island song)" (Tour 2011 Summer Final "Messenger" at Budokan multi angle live) |
| 2. | "Itsuka" (Tour 2011 Summer Final "Messenger" at Budokan multi angle live) |
| 3. | "Distance" (music video) |
| 4. | "Distance" (special feature) |

== Chart history ==
| Chart (2011) | Peak position |
|---|---|
| Billboard Japan Hot 100 | 8 |
| Oricon Weekly Chart | 4 |
| RIAJ Digital Track Chart | 33 |

== Notes ==
- ^Note a: The sales figure of 44,500 copies is taken from accumulating the sales of the single during its first three charting weeks on the Oricon weekly chart.
