= Neverland (F.T. Island song) =

2012 single by F.T. Island

- CD-only cover

Single by F.T. Island

from the album 20 [Twenty]
- Released: April 18, 2012
- Recorded: 2012
- Genre: Rock
- Length: 3:42
- Label: Warner Music Japan
- Songwriter: Junji Ishiwatari
- Producers: Youwhich, Daichi, Choi Jong Hun

F.T. Island Japanese singles chronology
"Distance" (2011)	"Neverland" (2012)	"Top Secret" (2012)

"Neverland" is a song by South Korean rock band F.T. Island. It is their seventh single under Warner Music Japan and tenth single overall in Japan. The song was written by Junji Ishiwatari and composed by Youwhich, Daichi and Choi Jong Hun. It was released on April 18, 2012, in three editions: CD and DVD, CD-only and Lawson Edition. The single debuted at number 10 on the Oricon weekly chart and at number 13 on the Billboard Japan Hot 100. The single went on to sell over 30,500 copies in Japan.

== Composition ==
"Neverland" was written by Junji Ishiwatari and composed by Youwhich, Daichi and Choi Jong Hun. "Wanna Go" and "Yuki" were written by Song Seunghyun and Kenn Kato and both songs were composed by Song Seunghyun and Choi Minhwan; the former was additionally composed by Corin.

== Release and promotion ==
"Neverland" was released on April 18, 2012, in three editions: CD and DVD which included performance footage of "Let It Go!" and "Distance" at the X'mas Live 2011 Winter's Night at the Yokohama Arena, as well as the "Neverland" music video and a special feature, a CD-only edition, and the Lawson edition, which included footage from the band's Music for All, All for One tour at the Yoyogi National Gymnasium on December 25, 2011.

"Neverland" was used as the opening theme song for the Japanese anime television series Ozuma by Leiji Matsumoto. In April 2012, an English-language version of "Neverland", retitled "Hit the Sands", was announced. "Hit the Sands" will be digitally released in over 50 countries.

== Chart performance ==
"Neverland" debuted at number ten on the weekly Oricon chart, selling 28,219 copies in its first week. The following week, "Neverland" fell to number 45, selling 2,315 copies in its second week. "Neverland" went on to sale over 30,500 copies in Japan.^{a} On the issue dated April 30, 2012, the song debuted at number 13 on the Billboard Japan Hot 100. On the Recording Industry Association of Japan (RIAJ) Digital Track Chart, the song debuted at number 70.

== Track listing ==
All editions:
No.	Title	Lyrics	Music	Length
1.	"Neverland"	Junji Ishiwatari	Youwhich, Daichi, Choi Jong Hun	3:42
2.	"Wanna Go"	Song Seunghyun, Kenn Kato	Song Seunghyun, Choi Minhwan, Corin	3:26
3.	"Yuki"	Song Seunghyun, Kenn Kato	Song Seunghyun, Choi Minhwan	4:33
4.	"Neverland" (Instrumental)		Youwhich, Daichi, Choi Jong Hun	3:42
Total length:				15:22

CD and DVD
No.	Title	Length
1.	"Let It Go!" (X'mas Live 2011 Winter's Night @Yokohama Arena multi angle)
2.	"Distance" (X'mas Live 2011 Winter's Night @Yokohama Arena multi angle)
3.	"Neverland" (music video)
4.	"Neverland" (special feature)

Lawson Edition
No.	Title	Length
1.	"Brand-new Days"
2.	"Let It Go!"
3.	"Life"
4.	"Venus"
5.	"Distance"
6.	"Winter's Night"
7.	"Flower Rock"

== Chart history ==
Chart (2012)	Peak position
Billboard Japan Hot 100	13
Oricon Weekly Chart	10
RIAJ Digital Track Chart	70

== Notes ==
- ^Note a: The sales figure of 30,500 copies is taken from accumulating the sales of the single during its first two charting weeks on the Oricon weekly chart.
