= Never Let Go (Jung Kook song) =

Single by Jung Kook
- Released: June 7, 2024
- Length: 2:46
- Label: Big Hit
- Songwriters: Anton Martin Mendo; Bak; Jess Bluu; Jungkook; Melanie Joy Fontana; Michel Lindgren Schulz; Sim Fane; Tobias Dekker
- Producers: Bak; Sim Fane; Star Boy; Outtatown

Jung Kook singles chronology
"Standing Next to You" (2023)	"Never Let Go" (2024)	"Yes or No" (2024)

Lyric video
- "Never Let Go" on YouTube

"Never Let Go" is a song by South Korean singer Jung Kook of BTS, released as a single on June 7, 2024, by Big Hit Music. Announced on June 3, the song was described as a "heartfelt tribute" to his fans, and is a part of BTS' 11th anniversary event "BTS Festa 2024".

== Charts ==
=== Weekly charts ===
Weekly chart performance
Chart (2024)	Peak position
Canada Digital Song Sales (Billboard)	7
Global 200 (Billboard)	20
Japan (Japan Hot 100)	33
Japan Combined Singles (Oricon)	44
Lithuania (AGATA)	44
New Zealand Hot Singles (RMNZ)	11
Singapore (RIAS)	18
South Korea (Circle)	52
Taiwan (Billboard)	24
UK Singles (OCC)	60
US Billboard Hot 100	97

=== Monthly charts ===
Monthly chart performance
Chart (2024)	Position
South Korea (Circle)	106

== Release history ==
Release dates and formats
Region	Date	Format	Label	Ref.
Various	June 7, 2024	Digital download; streaming	Big Hit	
Italy	June 27, 2024	Radio airplay	EMI	
