= Groovy (song) =

- Japanese version cover

Single by Cravity

from the EP Master: Piece
- Language: Korean
- B-side: "I Can't Fight the Feeling"
- Released: March 6, 2023
- Genre: K-pop
- Length: 3:22
- Label: Starship; Kakao
- Composers: Cage; Jimmy Claeson
- Lyricists: Hwang Yu-bin; Lee Hyo-jung; 12h51m; Serim; Allen

Cravity singles chronology
"Adrenaline" (2022)	"Groovy" (2023)	"Ready or Not" (2023)

Music video
- "Groovy" on YouTube

"Groovy" is a song recorded by South Korean boy group Cravity for their fifth extended play Master: Piece. It was released as the album's lead single by Starship Entertainment on March 6, 2023.

Professional ratings
Review scores
Source	Rating
IZM	3/5 stars

== Background and release ==
On February 10, 2023, Starship Entertainment announced that Cravity would be releasing their fifth extended play, Master: Piece, on March 6. On February 24, the track listing was released, with "Groovy" announced as the lead single. On March 4, the music video teaser was released. The song was released alongside its music video and the extended play on March 6. The Japanese version was released on July 5, 2023, as the group's debut single in Japan, alongside the B-side "I Can't Fight the Feeling".

== Composition ==
Musically, "Groovy" is a song that "stands out with the retro pop and hip-hop sensibility of the 2000s, and contains Cravity's unique atmosphere and energy".

== Critical reception ==
Jeff Benjamin from Billboard describes the single "Groovy" as a song that continues the bright, feel-good energy with additional sparkle and shimmer throughout their discography. In addition, he said that the funky rhythmic guitars have brought back some of Cravity's smoothest and coolest hooks to date, before the chorus of the song bursts into an explosion of synthesizers and brass as Cravity declares, "You make you feel so groovy!" in the music.

== Commercial performance ==
"Groovy" debuted at number 132 on South Korea's Circle Digital Chart on the chart issue dated March 5–11, 2023. On the monthly charts, Groovy debut and peaked at number 31 on the Circle Download Chart. Groovy is the first song from the group to enter the Circle Digital Charts in their career.

== Music video ==
The music video shows both sides of Cravity as the guys go from suit-and-tie office workers to colorfully dressed pop stars onstage and at press conferences that the paparazzi are fighting to film. The different worlds continuously mix throughout the visual until the final chorus, when the boys dance in vibrant, chic, contemporary suits.

== Promotion ==
Following the release of Master: Piece, on March 6, 2023, Cravity held a live promotion through the YouTube channel Zanmang Loopy, entitled Cravity Comeback Show in Jean Mang House. The group interacted and introduced the new album, including "Groovy", through real-time communication with fans.

The group subsequently performed on two music programs in the first week: Mnet's M Countdown on March 9, and on MBC's Show! Music Core on March 11. Cravity also performed "Groovy" on the entertainment program Weekly Idol before capping off the first week of promotions through a performance on Sunmi's Show! Interview.

Through the global short-form mobile video application TikTok, multiple artists joined and followed the Groovy challenge, including Sunmi, EXO's Kai, Seventeen's Dino, MONSTA X's Minhyuk, Hyungwon, and Jooheon.

On April 3, Cravity successfully wrapped up the music broadcast promotion of the lead single "Groovy" from their 5th mini-album "Master: Piece," ending with a performance on SBS' 'Inkigayo', which aired on the 2nd of the month.

== Track listing ==
"Groovy" (Japanese version) track listing
No.	Title	Lyrics	Music	Arrangement	Length
1.	"Groovy" (Japanese version)	Hwang Yu-bin; Lee Hyo-jung; 12h51m; Serim; Allen; Show	Cage; Jimmy Claeson	Cage	3:23
2.	"I Can't Fight the Feeling"	Joe Ogawa; Marcello Jonno	Oskari Ruohonen; Ogawa	Ogawa	3:24
Total length:					6:47

"Groovy" (Japanese version) DVD bonus track
No.	Title	Length
1.	"Groovy" (Japanese version; music video)	3:24
2.	"Groovy" (Japanese version; MV making movie)	29:47
Total length:		39:47

== Credits and personnel ==
Credits adapted from Bugs!.

- Cravity – vocals
- Hwang Yu-bin – lyrics
- 12h51m (Verygoods) – lyrics
- Lee Hyo-jung (Verygoods) – lyrics
- Serim – lyrics
- Allen – lyrics
- Cage – composition, arrangement
- Jimmy Claeson – composition

== Charts ==
=== Weekly charts ===
Weekly chart performance for "Groovy"
Chart (2023)	Peak position
South Korea (Circle)	132

Weekly chart performance for "Groovy" (Japanese version)
Chart (2023)	Peak position
Japan (Japan Hot 100)	15
Japan (Oricon)	3
Japan Combined Singles (Oricon)	6

=== Monthly charts ===
Monthly chart performance for "Groovy"
Chart (2023)	Position
Japan (Oricon)	11
South Korea Download (Circle)	31

== Release history ==
Release history for "Groovy"
Region	Date	Format	Version	Label
Various	March 6, 2023	Digital download; streaming	Original	Starship; Kakao
Various	July 5, 2023	Digital download; streaming	Japanese	Victor
Japan	July 5, 2023	CD+DVD; CD	Japanese	Victor
