= 20 (Twenty) =

20 [Twenty]

Studio album by F.T. Island
- Released: May 16, 2012
- Recorded: 2011–12; South Korea
- Genre: Rock
- Length: 44:02
- Language: Japanese
- Label: Warner Music Japan

F.T. Island chronology
Grown-Up (2012)	20 [Twenty] (2012)	Five Treasure Box (2012)

Singles from 20 [Twenty]
- 1. "Let It Go!" Released: July 27, 2011; 2. "Distance" Released: November 30, 2011; 3. "Neverland" Released: April 18, 2012

20 [Twenty] (stylized as 20 [twenty]) is the third studio album released in Japan by South Korean rock band F.T. Island. It is their second studio album under Warner Music Japan and third studio album overall in the country. Recorded in South Korea in the midst of the band's promotions there, the band aimed to make 20 [Twenty] their most mature album to date. The album spawned three singles prior to its release—"Let It Go!", "Distance", and "Neverland"—which all charted within the top ten spots of the weekly Oricon singles chart.

20 [Twenty] was released on May 16, 2012, in three editions: a CD-only edition, a CD and DVD edition, and a Lawson edition. In order to promote the album, the band held two release events shortly after the album's release. The album debuted at number four on the weekly Oricon albums chart and the Billboard Japan Top Albums. Selling over 41,000 copies in its first week, 20 [Twenty] earned F.T. Island their best first-week album sales in Japan. From June to July, they embarked on their F.T. Island Summer Tour 2012: Run! Run! Run! and performed in various venues across Japan.

== Background and development ==
After performing at the Nippon Budokan in 2011, F.T. Island recorded the song "Let It Go!" in commemoration of the event. Recorded during the same period, "Neverland" was composed by Choi Jong Hoon. Described as an energetic song, he recorded the guitar as the final bit to make the instrument the most prominent in the recording. He penned the song "Stay", which is based on his personal relationship experiences. He initially wrote the lyrics in Korean, then translated them into Japanese, using a translator where he was unable to translate the lyrics by himself. The process between three and four hours.

Choi Min Hwan and Song Seung Hyun worked on the songs "Always" and "Compass" together while in high school. Discussing "Always", Choi Min Hwan compared the song to "Satisfaction" in that one may feel a similar "atmosphere and a strength", but noted that there was more emphasis of sorrow in "Always". "Paper Plane" is a medium-tempo song, which features a dense snare drum. "Distance" was written by Kenn Kato, Song Seung Hyun and Lee Jae Jin, and composed by Corin. Lead singer Lee Hongki had difficulty singing the song, stating that the key he sang in was very high.

20 [Twenty] was recorded while F.T. Island was in the midst of promoting in South Korea, which limited their time on the project. Determined to convey the proper emotions of the songs, they "made sure to stop and interpret every part of the lyrics". F.T. Island aimed to make 20 [Twenty] their most mature album to date. The title of the album refers to the average age of the band members.

== Release and promotion ==
"Let It Go!" was released as the first single on July 27, 2011. The single peaked at number four on the weekly Oricon singles chart and sold over 41,500 copies in Japan.^{a} The second single "Distance" was released on November 30 in the same year, which also peaked at number four on the weekly Oricon singles chart, selling over 44,500 copies.^{b} On April 18, 2012, "Neverland" was the third single released from the album. It peaked at number 10 on the weekly Oricon singles chart and sold over 30,500 copies in Japan.^{c} The song "Stay" was used as the opening theme song for TV Asahi's Music Ru TV and TV Tokyo's Japan Countdown, and was used as the ending theme for Nippon Television.

20 [Twenty] was released on May 16, 2012, in three editions: a CD-only edition which features the bonus track "Hit the Sands", a CD and DVD edition which includes the Korean version of "Satisfaction" as a bonus track, and the music video for "Stay" and a special feature, and a Lawson edition which contains footage from March 2012 of F.T. Island's performances at Fuji-Q Highland. On May 19 and 20, 2012, F.T. Island held two release events for the album at Zepp Tokyo and the Hotarumachi Dōjima River Forum in Osaka, respectively. An estimate of 10,000 winners of a lottery were in attendance in both events, where the band performed five songs. On May 26, 2012, F.T. Island performed "Neverland" on Fuji Television's music show Music Fair. The following day, they performed acoustic versions of the songs "Stay", "Flower Rock", "Soyogi", and "Venus" on Space Shower TV.

From June 24 to July 8, 2012, the band embarked on their F.T. Island Summer Tour 2012: Run! Run! Run! and performed in various venues across Japan, including at the Sun Dome Fukui in Fukui and the Saitama Super Arena in Saitama, Japan. Their shows drew in over 60,000 audience attendees in total.

== Chart performance ==
20 [Twenty] debuted at number four on the weekly Oricon albums chart, selling 41,726 copies in its first week. The album earned F.T. Island their best first-week sales in Japan. On the Billboard Japan Top Albums, 20 [Twenty] also debuted at number four. The album has sold 44,603 copies in Japan.^{d}

== Track listing ==
All editions:
No.	Title	Lyrics	Music	Length
1.	"Let It Go!"	Kaji Katsura, Choi Min Hwan, Lee Hongki	Corin, Choi Jong Hoon	3:42
2.	"Neverland"	Junji Ishiwatari	Youwhich, Suzuki "Daichi" Hideyuki, Choi Jong Hoon	3:42
3.	"Stay"	Choi Jong Hoon, Kenn Kato	Choi Jong Hoon, Corin	4:22
4.	"Wanna Go"	Song Seung Hyun, Kenn Kato	Song Seung Hyun, Choi Min Hwan, Corin	3:26
5.	"Someday"	Lee Jae Jin	Lee Jae Jin	4:08
6.	"Distance"	Kenn Kato, Song Seung Hyun, Lee Jae Jin	Corin	5:16
7.	"Always"	Song Seung Hyun, Kenn Kato	Hiroki Horiko	3:47
8.	"Compass"	Song Seung Hyun, Kenn Kato	Song Seung Hyun, Choi Min Hwan	3:50
9.	"Paper Plane"	Lee Jae Jin, Kenn Kato	Lee Jae Jin, Corin	4:05
10.	"Endless Story"	Lee Jae Jin, Kenn Kato	Lee Jae Jin, Suzuki "Daichi" Hideyuki	4:10
11.	"Life"	Lee Jae Jin, Kenn Kato	Choi Jong Hoon	3:41
Total length:				44:02

CD-only:
No.	Title	Music	Length
12.	"Hit the Sands"	Youwhich, Suzuki "Daichi" Hideyuki, Choi Jong Hoon	3:42

CD and DVD:
No.	Title	Length
12.	"Satisfaction" (Korean version)	4:07
13.	"Stay" (music video)
14.	"Stay" (special feature)

Lawson:
No.	Title	Length
1.	"Ready Go!!"
2.	"Life"
3.	"Venus"
4.	"Severely" (ものすごく; Monosugoku)
5.	"Like Birds" (鳥のように; Tori no Yō ni)
6.	"Let It Go!"
7.	"Flower Rock"

== Charts ==
Chart (2012)	Peak position
Billboard Japan Top Albums	4
Oricon Weekly Albums Chart	4

== Notes ==
- ^Note a: The sales figure of 41,500 copies is taken from accumulating the sales of the single during its first four charting weeks on the Oricon weekly chart (33,418, 3,106, 3,060, 1,954).
- ^Note b: The sales figure of 44,500 copies is taken from accumulating the sales of the single during its first three charting weeks on the Oricon weekly chart (39,120, 3,377, 2,055).
- ^Note c: The sales figure of 30,500 copies is taken from accumulating the sales of the single during its first two charting weeks on the Oricon weekly chart (28,219, 2,315).
- ^Note d: The sales figure of 44,603 copies is taken from accumulating the sales of the single during its first two charting weeks on the Oricon weekly chart (41,726, 2,877).
