= Standing Next to You =

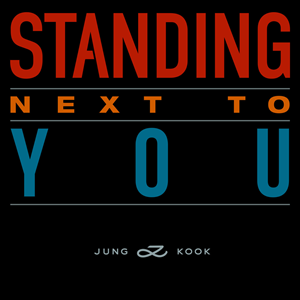

Single by Jung Kook

from the album Golden
- Released: November 3, 2023
- Genre: Funk-pop
- Length: 3:26
- Label: Big Hit
- Songwriters: Andrew Watt; Henry Walter; Ali Tamposi; Jon Bellion; Johntá Austin; Usher Raymond IV (Note: Johntá Austin and Usher Raymond IV are credited on the remix with Usher only.)
- Producers: Watt; Cirkut

Jung Kook singles chronology
| "Too Much" (2023) | "Standing Next to You" (2023) | "Never Let Go" (2024) |

Usher singles chronology
| "Transparency" (2023) | "Standing Next to You" (remix) (2023) | "Ruin" (2024) |

Music video
- "Standing Next to You" on YouTube

"Standing Next to You" is a song by South Korean singer Jung Kook of BTS. It was released on November 3, 2023, as the third single from his debut studio album Golden (2023). It reached the top ten in Lithuania, Hong Kong, India, Indonesia, Latvia, Japan, Malaysia, Peru, Philippines, Singapore, Taiwan, and the United States. In the United Kingdom, it became Jung Kook's fourth consecutive top ten entry on the UK Singles Chart. A remix with American singer Usher, later included on his ninth studio album Coming Home (2024), was released on December 1, 2023.

== Background and release ==
On October 15, 2023, "Standing Next to You" was revealed as the fourth track on and next single from Jung Kook's upcoming debut album, Golden, according to an announcement by Big Hit. The song marks the second collaboration between Jung Kook and American singer-songwriter Andrew Watt and Canadian record producer Cirkut, following "Seven" earlier that year. An official announcement poster for the single, including the exact time of release, were revealed the next day, depicting Jung Kook in a black blazer and a chain leaning against a gray backdrop. The single's cover artwork, consisting of simple red, blue, and gray lettering against a black background, was revealed on streaming services later that day.

A remix of the single with American singer Usher was released on December 1, 2023.

== Music video ==
Directed by Tanu Muino and filmed in Budapest, Jung Kook pursues a "mysterious femme fatale" while "showcasing his dance skills through elaborate choreography" performed at various locations with a group of dancers. At the end of the video, Jung Kook and the woman stand face-to-face with each other.

== Live performances ==
Jung Kook performed "Standing Next to You" for the first time, accompanied by a live band, at an album release party hosted by iHeartRadio on November 5, 2023, in honor of Golden. He gave the premiere US television performance of the song on the November 7 episode of The Tonight Show Starring Jimmy Fallon. The following day, the singer performed it during his appearance on the Today Show as part of the program's Citi Concert Series, then again on November 9 during a surprise five-song set presented on the TSX Entertainment stage at Times Square in New York City; the show was announced 30 minutes prior to its start and livestreamed via BTS' channel on YouTube and the Xbox channel on Twitch.

== Covers ==
"Standing Next to You" has also been covered by several other artists. In February 2024, actor and singer Ahn Hyo-seop covered the song as part of a show in Tokyo. In September 2025, singer Ryujin of the girl group Itzy performed the song at the group's fan meeting event. In December 2025, the song was covered by Kazuha of the girl group Le Sserafim at the KBS Song Festival.

== Accolades ==
"Standing Next to You" won two first-place trophies on the November 9 and 16, 2023, episodes of M Countdown, and three consecutive Melon Popularity awards from November 20 to December 4.

Year-end lists for "Standing Next to You"
| Critic/Publication | List | Rank | Ref. |
|---|---|---|---|
| Dazed | Top 50 best K-pop tracks of 2023 | 28 | |
| Grammy | 15 K-Pop Songs That Took 2023 By Storm | N/A | |
| Los Angeles Times | The 100 Best Songs of 2023 | 25 | |

Name of the Awards & Nominations for Standing Next To You
| Award ceremony | Year | Category | Result | Ref. |
|---|---|---|---|---|
| Billboard Music Awards | 2024 | Top Selling Song | Nominated | |
| Billboard Music Awards | 2024 | Top Global K-Pop Song | Won | |
| BMI Pop Awards | 2025 | Most Performed Song of The Year | Won | |
| MAMA Awards | 2024 | Best Dance Performance Male Solo | Won | |
| MAMA Awards | 2024 | Song of the Year | Nominated | |

== Track listing ==
CD and digital single

1. "Standing Next to You" – 3:26

Digital – The Remixes

1. "Standing Next to You" – 3:26
2. "Standing Next to You" (instrumental) – 3:22
3. "Standing Next to You" (Slow Jam remix) – 3:16
4. "Standing Next to You" (PBR&B remix) – 3:16
5. "Standing Next to You" (Latin Trap remix) – 2:56
6. "Standing Next to You" (Holiday remix) – 3:18
7. "Standing Next to You" (Future Funk remix) – 3:17
8. "Standing Next to You" (Band version) – 3:24

Digital – Usher remix

1. "Standing Next to You" (Usher remix) – 3:34

== Charts ==
=== Weekly charts ===
Weekly chart performance
| Chart (2023–2024) | Peak position |
|---|---|
| Argentina Hot 100 (Billboard) | 97 |
| Australia (ARIA) | 33 |
| Austria (Ö3 Austria Top 40) | 51 |
| Belarus Airplay (TopHit) Usher remix | 16 |
| Belgium (Ultratop 50 Flanders) | 43 |
| Bolivia (Billboard) | 19 |
| Brazil Hot 100 (Billboard) | 47 |
| Canada Hot 100 (Billboard) | 30 |
| CIS Airplay (TopHit) Usher remix | 20 |
| France (SNEP) | 44 |
| Germany (GfK) | 55 |
| Greece International (IFPI) | 10 |
| Global 200 (Billboard) | 1 |
| Hong Kong (Billboard) | 3 |
| Ireland (IRMA) | 19 |
| India International Singles (IMI) | 2 |
| Indonesia (Billboard) | 2 |
| Japan (Japan Hot 100) | 12 |
| Japan Combined Singles (Oricon) | 12 |
| Kazakhstan Airplay (TopHit) Usher remix | 3 |
| Latvia Airplay (LAIPA) | 8 |
| Latvia Streaming (LAIPA) | 9 |
| Lithuania (AGATA) | 2 |
| Lithuania Airplay (TopHit) | 16 |
| Luxembourg (Billboard) | 20 |
| Malaysia (Billboard) | 2 |
| Malaysia International (RIM) | 2 |
| MENA (IFPI) | 1 |
| Netherlands (Dutch Top 40) | 24 |
| Netherlands (Single Top 100) | 71 |
| Netherlands (Tipparade) | 4 |
| New Zealand (Recorded Music NZ) | 25 |
| New Zealand Hot Singles (RMNZ) Usher remix | 13 |
| Nigeria (TurnTable Top 100) | 60 |
| North Africa (IFPI) | 3 |
| Peru (Billboard) | 8 |
| Philippines (Billboard) | 3 |
| Poland (Polish Streaming Top 100) | 63 |
| Portugal (AFP) | 24 |
| Russia Airplay (TopHit) Usher Remix | 13 |
| San Marino (SMRRTV Top 50) | 12 |
| San Marino (SMRRTV Top 50) Usher remix | 10 |
| Saudi Arabia (IFPI) | 4 |
| Singapore (RIAS) | 2 |
| Slovakia Singles Digital (ČNS IFPI) | 53 |
| South Korea (Circle) | 6 |
| Suriname (Nationale Top 40) | 12 |
| Sweden (Sverigetopplistan) | 75 |
| Switzerland (Schweizer Hitparade) | 35 |
| Taiwan (Billboard) | 4 |
| UAE (IFPI) | 1 |
| UK Singles (Official Charts) | 6 |
| US Billboard Hot 100 | 5 |
| US Pop Airplay (Billboard) | 22 |
| Vietnam Hot 100 (Billboard) | 4 |

=== Monthly charts ===
Monthly chart performance for "Standing Next to You"
| Chart (2023–2024) | Position |
|---|---|
| Belarus Airplay (TopHit) Usher remix | 18 |
| CIS Airplay (TopHit) Usher remix | 24 |
| Kazakhstan Airplay (TopHit) Usher remix | 4 |
| Lithuania Airplay (TopHit) | 11 |
| Russia Airplay (TopHit) Usher remix | 12 |
| South Korea (Circle) | 9 |

=== Year-end charts ===
Year-end chart performance
| Chart (2024) | Position |
|---|---|
| Belarus Airplay (TopHit) Usher Remix | 46 |
| CIS Airplay (TopHit) Usher Remix | 43 |
| Global 200 (Billboard) | 36 |
| Kazakhstan Airplay (TopHit) Usher Remix | 7 |
| Philippines (Philippines Hot 100) | 53 |
| Russia Airplay (TopHit) Usher Remix | 21 |
| South Korea (Circle) | 121 |

== Certifications ==
Certifications
| Region | Certification | Certified units/sales |
|---|---|---|
| Canada (Music Canada) | 2× Platinum | 160,000^{‡} |
| France (SNEP) | Gold | 100,000^{‡} |
| New Zealand (RMNZ) | Gold | 15,000^{‡} |
| United Kingdom (BPI) | Silver | 200,000^{‡} |
Streaming
| Japan (RIAJ) | Gold | 50,000,000^{†} |
^{‡} Sales+streaming figures based on certification alone.^{†} Streaming-only figures based on certification alone.

== Release history ==
Release dates and formats
| Region | Date | Format(s) | Version | Label | Ref. |
|---|---|---|---|---|---|
| Various | November 3, 2023 | CD single; digital download; streaming | Original | Big Hit | |
| Various | November 6, 2023 | Digital download; streaming | The Remixes | Big Hit | |
| Various | December 1, 2023 | Digital download; streaming | Usher remix | Big Hit | |
| Italy | February 1, 2024 | Radio airplay | Original; Usher remix | Universal | |
