= Satisfaction (F.T. Island song) =

- CD-only cover

Single by F.T. Island

from the album Five Treasure Island
- Released: April 20, 2011
- Recorded: 2011
- Genre: Rock
- Length: 4:07
- Label: Warner Music Japan
- Songwriter: Junji Ishiwatari

F.T. Island Japanese singles chronology
"So Today..." (2010)	"Satisfaction" (2011)	"Let It Go!" (2011)

"Satisfaction" (stylized as "SATISFACTION") is a song by South Korean rock band F.T. Island. It is their fourth single under Warner Music Japan and seventh single overall in Japan, and is included on their second Japanese studio album Five Treasure Island. The song was written by Junji Ishiwatari and composed by Hiroki Horiko. It was released on April 20, 2011, in three editions: a CD-only edition, and limited editions A and B. The single debuted at number two on the Oricon weekly chart and went on to sell over 43,000 copies in Japan.

== Composition ==
"Satisfaction" was written by Junji Ishiwatari, composed by Hiroki Horiko, and arranged by Satoru Hiraide. "Friends" was written by Lee Jae-jin and Hisashi Kondo, composed by Choi Jong-hoon and Shotaro Kobayashi, and arranged by F.T. Island and Kobayashi. "I Want" was written by Lee and Kondo, composed by Choi and Kobayashi, and arranged by F.T. Island and Yu Odakura.

"Satisfaction" was recorded in Korean and is included as a bonus track on the CD and DVD edition of F.T. Islands third Japanese studio album 20 [Twenty].

== Release and promotion ==
"Satisfaction" was released on April 20, 2011, in three editions: a CD-only edition which includes one of seven random trading cards; a limited edition A which includes the music video of the song and a special feature; and a limited edition B which includes the completed version of Music On! TV's program Zensoku Zenshin! F.T. Island's "Zensoku Zenshin! F.T. Island Special" and outtakes.

"Satisfaction" was used as the ending theme music for Fuji Television's anime Toriko. F.T. Island performed the song on the network's music show Hey! Hey! Hey! Music Champ on May 2, 2011.

== Chart performance ==
"Satisfaction" debuted at number two on the Oricon weekly singles chart, becoming F.T. Island's highest charting single to date, selling 34,163 copies in its first week. It charted for 13 weeks and went on to sell over 43,000 copies in Japan.^{a} On the issue dated May 2, 2011, the song debuted at number 9 on the Billboard Japan Hot 100. On the Recording Industry Association of Japan (RIAJ) Digital Track Chart, the song debuted at number 43, peaking at number 42 the following week.

== Track listing ==
All editions:
No.	Title	Lyrics	Music	Length
1.	"Satisfaction"	Junji Ishiwatari	Hiroki Horiko	4:07
2.	"Friends"	Lee Jae-jin, Hisashi Kondo	Choi Jong-hoon, Shotaro Kobayashi	3:14
3.	"I Want"	Lee, Kondo	Choi Jong-hoon	3:50
4.	"Satisfaction" (Instrumental)		Horiko	4:07
Total length:				15:18

Limited edition A
No.	Title	Length
1.	"Satisfaction" (music video)
2.	"Satisfaction" (special feature)

Limited edition B
No.	Title	Length
1.	"Music On! TV show Zensoku Zenshin! F.T. Island's 'Zensoku Zenshin! F.T. Island Special' complete version & outtakes"

== Chart history ==
Chart (2011)	Peak position
Billboard Japan Hot 100	9
Oricon Weekly Chart	2
RIAJ Digital Track Chart	42

== Notes ==
- ^Note a: The sales figure of 43,000 copies is taken from accumulating the sales of the single during its first four charting weeks on the Oricon weekly chart (34,163, 4,196, 3,197, 1,502).
