= Let It Go! =

- CD-only cover

Single by F.T. Island

from the album 20 (Twenty)
- Released: July 27, 2011
- Recorded: 2011
- Genre: Rock
- Length: 3:42
- Label: Warner Music Japan
- Songwriters: Kaji Katsura, Choi Minhwan, Lee Hongki

F.T. Island Japanese singles chronology
"Satisfaction" (2011)	"Let It Go!" (2011)	"Distance" (2011)

"Let It Go!" is a song by South Korean rock band F.T. Island. It is their fifth single under Warner Music Japan and eight single overall in Japan. The song was written by Kaji Katsura, Choi Minhwan and Lee Hongki, and composed by Corin and Choi Jong-hoon. It was released on July 27, 2011, in three editions: CD and DVD Type A, CD and DVD Type B and CD-only. The single debuted at number four on the Oricon weekly chart and at number six on the Billboard Japan Hot 100. "Let It Go!" went on to sell over 41,500 copies in Japan.

== Composition ==
"Let It Go!" was written by Kaji Katsura, Choi Minhwan and Lee Hongki and composed by Corin and Choi Jong-hoon. "Dream Sky" was written and composed by Song Seunghyun, with additional composition by Choi Minhwan. "Someday" was written and composed by Lee Jaejin.

== Release and promotion ==
"Let It Go!" was released on July 27, 2011, in three editions: CD and DVD Type A which included footage from two release events of their fourth single "Satisfaction" and one release event of their second Japanese studio album Five Treasure Island, CD and DVD Type B which included the music video to "Let It Go!" and a special feature, and CD-only edition.

On July 29, 2011, F.T. Island performed at Nippon Budokan for the first time, where they performed "Let It Go!". The song was used by TV Asahi's Street Fighters as its theme song in August 2011. On August 7, the band performed on Fuji TV's annual FNS Music Festival.

== Chart performance ==
"Let It Go!" debuted at number four on the weekly Oricon chart, selling 33,418 copies in its first week. The following week, "Let It Go!" fell to number 35, selling 3,106 copies in its second week. In its third week, the single dropped one spot to number 36, selling 3,060 copies, followed by sales of 1,954 copies on its fourth week at number 46. "Let It Go!" went on to sale over 41,500 copies in Japan.^{a} On the issue dated August 13, 2011, the song debuted and peaked at number six on the Billboard Japan Hot 100. On the Recording Industry Association of Japan (RIAJ) Digital Track Chart, the song debuted at number 71.

== Track listing ==
All editions:
No.	Title	Lyrics	Music	Length
1.	"Let It Go!"	Kaji Katsura, Choi Minhwan, Lee Hongki	Corin, Choi Jong-hoon	3:42
2.	"Dream Sky"	Song Seunghyun	Song Seunghyun, Choi Minhwan	3:26
3.	"Someday"	Lee Jaejin	Lee Jaejin	4:08
4.	"Let It Go!" (Instrumental)		Kenji Tamai, Rui Momota	3:42
Total length:				14:58

CD and DVD Type A
No.	Title	Length
1.	"4th single "Satisfaction" Release Event @ Zepp Tokyo (2011.4.23) Footage"
2.	"4th single "Satisfaction" Release Event @ Dojima River Forum (2011.4.23) Footage"
3.	"1st Album Five Treasure Island Release Event @ Yomiuri Land (2011.5.18) Live (5 songs)"

CD and DVD Type B
No.	Title	Length
1.	"Let It Go!" (music video)
2.	"Let It Go!" (special feature)

== Chart history ==
Chart (2011)	Peak position
Billboard Japan Hot 100	6
Oricon Weekly Chart	4
RIAJ Digital Track Chart	71

== Notes ==
- ^Note a: The sales figure of 41,500 copies is taken from accumulating the sales of the single during its first four charting weeks on the Oricon weekly chart.
