= JYJ discography =

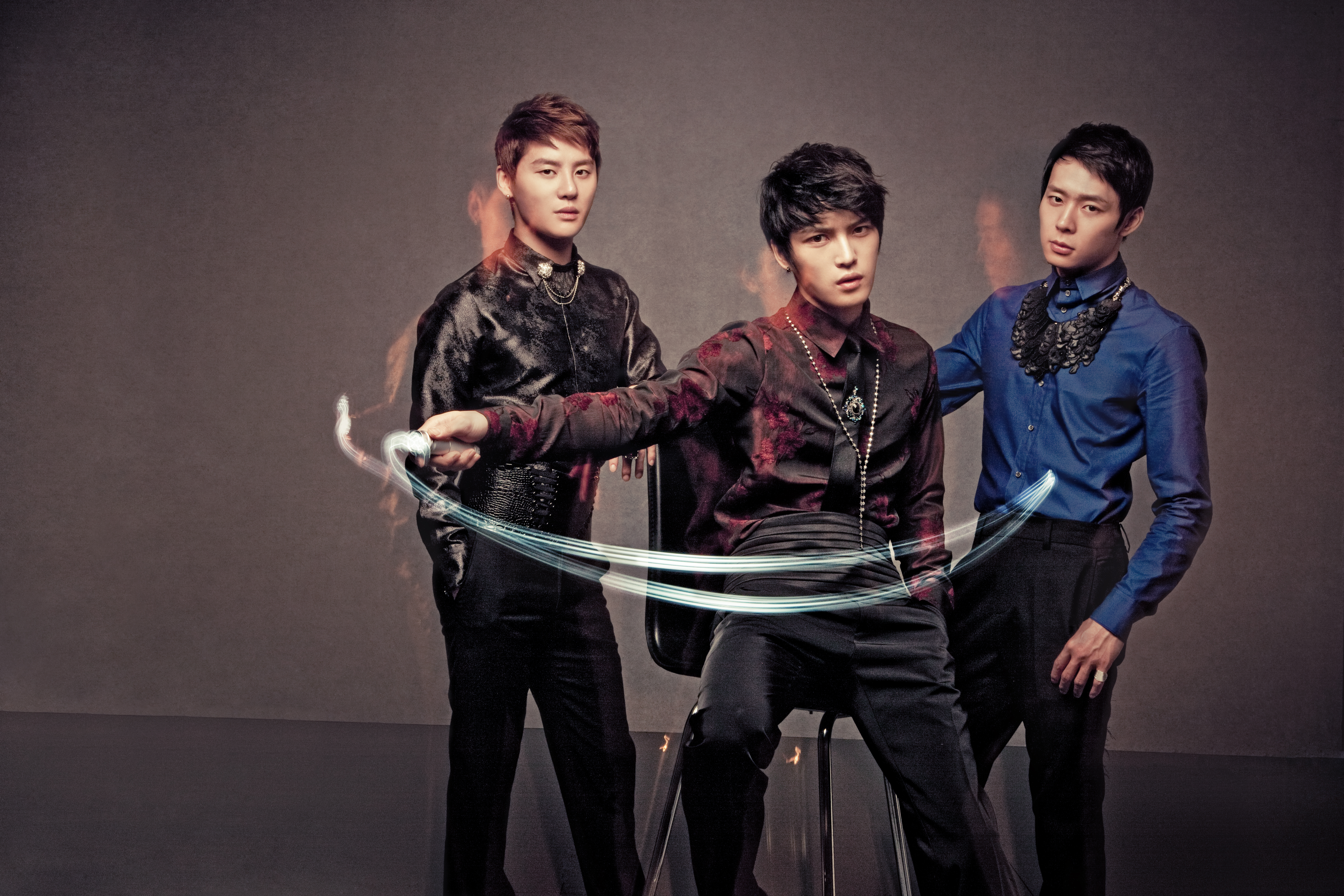
- JYJ appears in LG Optimus Q2 photoshoot. From left to right: Junsu, Jaejoong and Yoochun.
- Studio albums: 3
- Extended plays: 2
- Live albums: 1
- Music videos: 5

This is the discography of South Korean trio JYJ (formerly known as Junsu/Jejung/Yuchun in Japan). Formed in 2010, the group consists of Jaejoong, Yoochun and Junsu, who were formerly founding members of SM Entertainment's five-member boy band TVXQ.

== Albums ==
=== Studio albums ===
List of studio albums, with selected chart positions and sales figures
Title	Details	Peak chart positions		Sales
Title	Details	KOR	JPN	Sales
English
The Beginning	Released: October 14, 2010; Label: Warner Korea; Format: CD / 2CD+DVD, digital download	1	17	KOR: 316,576
Korean
In Heaven	Released: September 28, 2011; Label: C-JeS Entertainment; Format: CD / CD+DVD, digital download	1	8	WW: 350,000; KOR: 291,267
Just Us	Released: July 29, 2014; Label: C-JeS Entertainment; Format: CD, digital download	1	2	KOR: 168,836; JPN: 44,866
"—" denotes releases that did not chart or were not released in that region.

=== Live albums ===
- Thanksgiving Live in Dome (2011)

== Extended plays ==
List of extended plays, with selected chart positions, sales figures and certifications
Title	Details	Peak chart positions		Sales	Certifications
Title	Details	KOR	JPN	Sales	Certifications
Japanese
The... (promoted as "Junsu/Jejung/Yuchun")	Released: September 8, 2010; Label: Rhythm Zone; Format: CD / CD+DVD, digital download	—	1	JPN: 174,980	RIAJ: Gold
Korean
Their Rooms "Our Story"	Released: January 15, 2011; Label: C-JeS Entertainment; Format: Essaybook+CD	—	—	KOR: 200,000	
"—" denotes releases that did not chart or were not released in that region.

== Singles ==
List of singles, with selected chart positions
Title	Year	Peak chart positions				Sales	Album
Title	Year	KOR	KOR Hot	JPN	JPN Hot	Sales	Album
English
"Ayyy Girl" (featuring Kanye West, Malik Yusef)	2010	19	—	—	—		The Beginning
"Empty"	2010	18	—	—	—		The Beginning
Korean
"Get Out"	2011	8	10	—	—	KOR: 1,252,732	In Heaven
"In Heaven"	2011	5	10	—	—	KOR: 1,208,645	In Heaven
"Only One"	2013	87	91	—	52		2014 Incheon Asiad (single)
"Back Seat"	2014	6	—	—	—	KOR: 436,437	Just Us
Japanese
"Wake Me Tonight"	2015	—	—	2	3	JPN: 155,271	Non-album release
"—" denotes releases that did not chart or were not released in that region.

== Other charted songs ==
List of non-single songs, with selected chart positions, showing year released and album name
Title	Year	Peak chart positions		Album
Title	Year	KOR	KOR Hot	Album
"Be My Girl"	2010	52	—	The Beginning
"Still in Love"	2010	72	—	The Beginning
"I Love You" (featuring Flowsik)	2010	69	—	The Beginning
"I Can Soar"	2010	74	—	The Beginning
"Be The One"	2010	80	—	The Beginning
"Fallen Leaves"	2011	48	66	In Heaven
"The Boy's Letter"	2011	30	43	In Heaven
"Mission"	2011	61	93	In Heaven
"You're"	2011	43	63	In Heaven
"Nine"	2011	70	—	In Heaven
"I.D.S"	2011	73	—	In Heaven
"Pierrot"	2011	75	—	In Heaven
"Letting Go"	2014	41	—	Just Us
"7 Years"	2014	43	—	Just Us
"Dad, You There?"	2014	50	—	Just Us
"So So"	2014	40	—	Just Us
"2:30 AM"	2014	42	—	Just Us
"Let Me See"	2014	45	—	Just Us
"Thirty.."	2014	51	—	Just Us
"Baboboy"	2014	55	—	Just Us
"Dear J"	2014	57	—	Just Us
"Creation"	2014	58	—	Just Us
"Valentine"	2014	60	—	Just Us
"—" denotes releases that did not chart or were not released in that region.

== Soundtrack contributions ==
Year	Information	Contribution
2010	Sungkyunkwan Scandal OST: Released: 16 September 2010; Language: Korean	"찾았다" (Found You) - JYJ; "Too Love" - Junsu; "너에겐 이별 나에겐 기다림" (To You It's Goodbye, To Me It's Waiting) - Jaejoong
2011	Miss Ripley OST: Released: 21 June 2011; Language: Korean	"너를 위한 빈자리" (The Empty Space For You) - Yuchun
2011	Scent of a Woman OST: Released: 5 August 2011; Language: Korean	"You Are So Beautiful" - Junsu
2011	Protect the Boss OST: Released: 11 August 2011; Language: Korean	"지켜줄게" (I'll Protect You) - Jaejoong
2012	Rooftop Prince OST: Released: 10 May 2012; Language: Korean	"사랑이 싫다구요" (I Don't Like Love) - Junsu
2012	Dr. Jin OST: Released: 25 May 2012; Language: Korean	"살아도 꿈인 것처럼" (Living Like A Dream) - Jaejoong
2012	Nice Guy OST: Released: 26 September 2012; Language: Korean	"사랑은 눈꽃처럼" (Love Is Like A Snowflake) - Junsu
2012	Code Name: Jackal OST: Language: Korean	"나만의 위로" (Healing For Myself) - Jaejoong; "Kiss B" - Jaejoong; "Stay" - Jaejoong
2014	Triangle OST: Released: 9 June 2014; Released: 22 July 2014; Language: Korean	"Even Though I Hate It" - Jaejoong; "Coincidence" - Jaejoong

== DVDs ==
Year	Information	Track listing
2010	3hree Voices: Released: 28 July 2010; Format: 4DVD; Length: 180 min.; Language: Japanese; Subtitles: Japanese; Recorded: around January 2010; Sales: 65,000	Track listing Disc 1 Junsu in Sydney - 50min Disc 2 Jaejoong in White Horse, Canada - 50min Disc 3 Yuchun in Seoul - 50 min Disc 4 Offshoot & Digest - 30 min
2010	Thanksgiving Live In Dome: Released: 8 September 2010; Format: 2DVD; Length: 195 min.; Language: Japanese; Recorded: 12/13 June 2010 at Tokyo Dome, Tokyo; Sales: 140,000	Track listing Disc 1: 1. "いつだって君に" (Itsu Datte Kimi Ni); 2. "Shelter" - Jaejoong & Yuchun; 3. "君がいれば ~Beautiful Love~" - Junsu; 4. "悲しみのゆくえ" (Kanashimi No Yukue) - Junsu; 5. "君のために" (For You) [Korean song] - Jaejoong; 6. "Tokyo Lovelight" [Live Ver.] - Yuchun with Jaejoong & Junsu; 7. "Been So Long" [M-Flo cover] - Jaejoong & Yuchun with special guest Lisa; 8. "レイニーブルー" (Rainy Blue); 9. "君がいるだけで" (Kimi Ga Iru Dake De); 10. "I Have Nothing" [English song]; Disc 2: 1. "My Girlfriend" [Special Ver.] - Yuchun; 2. "Maze" - Jaejoong; 3. "Xiahtic" - Junsu Ft. Yuchun; 4. "Colors ~Melody And Harmony~" - Jaejoong & Yuchun; 5. "Get Ready"; 6. "Long Way"; Encore; 1. "Intoxication" - Junsu; 2. "W"; Special; 1. Making Movie; 2. Backstage Movie
2011	Memories In 2010: Released: March 2011; Format: 2DVD; Length: 170 min.; Language: Japanese; Recorded: 2010 in Japan	Track listing Disc 1 Making: 1. Photoshoot; 2. Jaejoong: an an Magazine Photoshoot, Sunao Ni Narenakute NGs; 3. Junsu: Xiah CD Jacket Photoshoot, "Intoxication" MV Offshoot, Release Event; 4. Jaejoong & Yuchun: Interview Movie in Korea; 5. Thanksgiving Live in Dome Offshoot; 6. A-Nation 2010 Offshoot; 7. The... Jacket Photography & Recording; Disc 2 A-Nation 2010 Stage Movie: 1. Full Performance; 1. "いつだって君に" (Itsu Datte Kimi Ni); 2. "Intoxication" - Junsu; 3. "Colors ~Melody And Harmony~" - Jaejoong & Yuchun; 4. "Get Ready"; 5. "Long Way"; 6. "W"; 2. Multiangles; 1. "Colors ~Melody And Harmony~"; 2. "いつだって君に" (Itsu Datte Kimi Ni); 3. "W"
2011	A Sweet White Day Valentine Date - 1st Fanmeeting: Released: March 2011; Format: 1DVD (VIP only); Language: Korean; Recorded: 14 March 2011	Track listing: Highlight; Fanmeeting; Performance; 1. "Empty"; 2. "Mission"; 3. "Nine"; 4. "찾았다" (Found You); 5. "Be My Girl" [Remix]; 6. "Empty" [Remix]; 7. "낙엽 (Fallen Leaves)"; Game; Talk
2011	3hree Voices II: Released: 25 May 2011; Format: 2DVD; Length: 180 min.; Language: Korean; Subtitles: English, Simplified/Traditional Chinese, Japanese; Recorded: around March 2011 in Japan	Track listing Disc 1: 1. Junsu - 50min 2. Jaejoong - 50min; Disc 2: 1. Yuchun - 50min 2. Making Of - 30min
2011	Come On Over: Released: December 2011; Format: 5DVD; Length: 345 min.; Released (Director's Cut): February 2012; Format (Director's Cut): 1DVD; Length (Director's Cut): 80 min.; Language: Korean; Subtitles: English, Chinese, Korean, Japanese; Recorded: around January 2011	Track listing Come On Over Disc 1 Jaejoong - 70min: 1. House; 2. Eating Out with Japanese Friend; 3. Sister's Shop; 4. Trip with Friends; 5. Family Home; 6. Birthday Party; Disc 2 Yuchun - 70min: 1. House; 2. Shopping at Yongin Folk Village; 3. Hell Ramyeon; 4. Yuhwan's Press Conference; 5. Snowboarding Trip: Day 1; 6. Snowboarding Trip: Day 2; Disc 3 Junsu - 70min: 1. House; 2. Football; 3. Tears Of Heaven Rehearsal 1; 4. Family Home; 5. Tears Of Heaven Rehearsal 2; 6. Tears Of Heaven Performance; Disc 4 JYJ - 70min: 1. Magazine Shoot; 2. Music Essay Signing Day; 3. Brand Suit Shoot; 4. International Fanmeeting; Disc 5 Special - 65min: 1. Making Of; 2. Special: Watching Come On Over & Spending Time Together; Come On Over Director's Cut: 1. Jaejoong; 1. House; 2. Trip with Friends; 3. Family Home; 4. Birthday Party; 2. Yuchun; 1. House; 2. Shopping at Yongin Folk Village & Hell Ramyeon; 3. Snowboarding Trip: Day 1; 4. Snowboarding Trip: Day 2; 3. Junsu; 1. House; 2. Football; 3. Family Home; 4. Tears Of Heaven Rehearsal & Performance; 4. JYJ; 1. International Fanmeeting; 2. Watching Come On Over & Spending Time Together
2011	Worldwide Concert In Seoul: Released: 23 December 2011; Format: 5DVD; Length: 448 min.; Language: Korean, English; Subtitles: English, Japanese; Recorded: 27/28 November 2010	Track listing Disc 1 Full Performances: 1. Act 1: The Creation; 2. "Empty"; 3. "I.D.S (I Deal Scenario)"; 4. "Still In Love" - Jaejoong; 5. Dance Break; 6. "삐에로 (Pierrot)"; 7. "Be My Girl"; 8. Act 2: The Test; 9. "Mission"; 10. "I Love You" - Yuchun Ft. Flowsik; 11. "취중진담" Drunk Confession - Yuchun; 12. "Nine"; 13. Interactive; 14. "Ayyy Girl"; 15. Act 3: The Evolution; 16. "Too Love" - Junsu; 17. "I Can Soar" - Junsu; 18. "너에겐 이별 나에겐 기다림" (To You It's Goodbye, To Me It's Waiting) - Jaejoong; 19. "찾았다 (Found You)"; 20. Talk; 21. "낙엽 (Fallen Leaves)"; 22. Act 4: Encore The Beginning; 23. "Be My Girl" [Remix]; 24. "Be The One"; 25. "Empty" [Remix]; 26. From Fan; Disc 2 Jaejoong Ver.: 1. Act 1: The Creation; 2. "Empty"; 3. "I.D.S (I Deal Scenario)"; 4. "Still In Love" - Jaejoong; 5. "삐에로 (Pierrot)"; 6. "Be My Girl"; 7. Act 2: The Test; 8. "Mission"; 9. "Nine"; 10. Interactive; 11. "Ayyy Girl"; 12. Act 3: The Evolution; 13. "너에겐 이별 나에겐 기다림" (To You It's Goodbye, To Me It's Waiting) - Jaejoong; 14. "찾았다 (Found You)"; 15. Talk; 16. "낙엽 (Fallen Leaves)"; 17. Act 4: Encore The Beginning; 18. "Be My Girl" [Remix]; 19. "Be The One"; 20. "Empty" [Remix]; 21. From Fan; Disc 3 Yuchun Ver.: 1. Act 1: The Creation; 2. "Empty"; 3. "I.D.S (I Deal Scenario)"; 4. "삐에로 (Pierrot)"; 5. "Be My Girl"; 6. Act 2: The Test; 7. "Mission"; 8. "I Love You" - Yuchun Ft. Flowsik; 9. "취중진담" Drunk Confession - Yuchun; 10. "Nine"; 11. Interactive; 12. "Ayyy Girl"; 13. Act 3: The Evolution; 14. "찾았다 (Found You)"; 15. Talk; 16. "낙엽 (Fallen Leaves)"; 17. Act 4: Encore The Beginning; 18. "Be My Girl" [Remix]; 19. "Be The One"; 20. "Empty" [Remix]; 21. From Fan; Disc 4 Junsu Ver.: 1. Act 1: The Creation; 2. "Empty"; 3. "I.D.S (I Deal Scenario)"; 4. "삐에로 (Pierrot)"; 5. "Be My Girl"; 6. Act 2: The Test; 7. "Mission"; 8. "Nine"; 9. Interactive; 10. "Ayyy Girl"; 11. Act 3: The Evolution; 12. "Too Love" - Junsu; 13. "I Can Soar" - Junsu; 14. "찾았다 (Found You)"; 15. Talk; 16. "낙엽 (Fallen Leaves)"; 17. Act 4: Encore The Beginning; 18. "Be My Girl" [Remix]; 19. "Be The One"; 20. "Empty" [Remix]; 21. From Fan; Disc 5 Special: 1. Concert Highlight; 2. Making; 3. Showcase Highlight
2012	JYJ Unforgettable Live in Japan: Released: January 2013; Format: 2DVD; Language: Japanese; Subtitles: Japanese (English subtitles for English lyric parts only); Recorded: 15–16 October 2011; Sales: 50,000	Track listing Disc 1 Full Concert: 1. "Empty"; 2. "Pierrot"; 3. "Ayyy Girl"; 4. "Be My Girl" + "Be My Girl" [Remix]; 5. BTS Video; 6. "I Love You" (Yuchun's solo); 7. "I'll Protect You" (Jejung's Solo); 8. "You’re So Beautiful" (Junsu’s solo); 9. Interactive; 10. "Found You"; 11. VCR clips Special; 12. "I.D.S" + "Be The One" [Remix]; 13. Nine; 14. Fallen Leaves; 15. Mission; 16. Get Out; 17. Ment; 18. In Heaven; 19. Encore: "Empty" [Remix]; Disc 2 Making (Bonus Features): 1. Dance Spot; 2. Concert Plan; 3. Rehearsal II; 4. 'Behind Scene'; 5. Rehearsal I

== Music videos ==
Year	Track	Album	Artist	Members			Ref.
Year	Track	Album	Artist	Jaejoong	Yoochun	Junsu	Ref.
2010	"Ayyy Girl"	The Beginning	JYJ	x	x	x	
2011	"In Heaven"	In Heaven	JYJ			x	
2011	"Get Out"	In Heaven	JYJ	x	x	x	
2013	"Only One"	2014 Incheon Asiad Single	JYJ	x	x	x	
2014	"Back Seat"	Just Us	JYJ	x	x	x	

== See also ==
- List of songs recorded by JYJ
- TVXQ discography
