= List of songs recorded by JYJ =

List of songs by South Korean boy band JYJ

Here is a list of songs by South Korean three-member boy band JYJ (formerly known as Junsu/Jejung/Yuchun in Japan). Formed in 2010, it consists by Jaejoong, Yoochun and Junsu, who are former founding members of SM Entertainment five-member boyband TVXQ.

== 0-9 ==
Song	Writer/Artist	Album	Year
"2:30 AM (새벽 두시 반)"	Michin Kamseong, Brandyn Burnette, Odd Jensen, Elisabeth Carew	Just Us	2014
"7 Years (7살)"	Michin Kamseong, Im Han-byeol	Just Us	2014

== A ==
Song	Writer/Artist	Album	Year
"Ayy Girl (with Kanye West and Malik Yusef)"	Kyoko Hamler, P.Phenom, Malik Yusef	The Beginning	2010

== B ==
Song	Writer/Artist	Album	Year
"Be My Babe/Be My Girl"	L.Daniels, Kyoko Hamler, T.Parker	The Beginning	2010
"Be The One"	Jae Chong, Kyoko Hamler	The Beginning	2010
"Boy's Letter"	Kim Jaejoong	In Heaven	2011
"Baboboy"	Kim Jaejoong	Just Us	2014
"Back Seat"	Kim Tae-won, Dong Ne-hyeong, Won Yeong-heon	Just Us	2014

== C ==
Song	Writer/Artist	Album	Year
"Creation"	Kim Jaejoong, Takashi Fukuda, Richard K & Edward K	Just Us	2014

== D ==
Song	Writer/Artist	Album	Year
"Dad, You There?"	Park Yoochun, Daryle ‘D.Brown’ Oldham	Just Us	2014
"Dear J"	Kim Jaejoong	Just Us	2014

== E ==
Song	Writer/Artist	Album	Year
"Empty"	L.Daniels, Kyoko Hamler, T.Parker	The Beginning	2010
"Empty Space For You"	Park Yoochun (solo)	Miss Ripley OST	2011

== F ==
Song	Writer/Artist	Album	Year
"Found You"		Sungkyunkwan Scandal OST	2010
"Fallen Leaves"	Kim Junsu	Their Rooms "Our Story"	2011

== G ==
Song	Writer/Artist	Album	Year
"Get Ready"	H.U.B, H-Wonder	The...	2010
"Get Out"	Kim Jaejoong, Park Yoochun	In Heaven	2011

== I ==
Song	Writer/Artist	Album	Year
"Itsudatte Kimi Ni"	Gorō Matsui, Reo	The...	2010
"I Can Soar"	Kyoko Hamler	The Beginning	2010
"I Love You (with Flowsik)"	Kyoko Hamler, Flowsik	The Beginning	2010
"I Deal Scenario"	Kim Jaejoong	Their Rooms "Our Story"	2011
"In Heaven"	Kim Jaejoong	In Heaven	2011
"I'll Protect You"	Kim Jaejoong (solo)	Protect the Boss OST	2011
"I Don't Like Love"	Kim Junsu (solo)	Rooftop Prince OST	2012

== J ==
Song	Writer/Artist	Album	Year
"Just Us (Intro)"	Park II	Just Us	2014

== L ==
Song	Writer/Artist	Album	Year
"Long Way"	H.U.B, Denise Rich	The...	2010
"Living Like A Dream"	Kim Jaejoong (solo)	Dr. Jin OST	2012
"Love Is Like A Snowflake"	Kim Junsu (solo)	The Innocent Man OST	2012
"Let Me See"	Kim Jaejoong, Hoe Jang-nim, 2JAJA, AQX	Just Us	2014
"Letting Go"	Kim Junsu, Park Yoochun, Daryle “D.Brown” Oldham	Just Us	2014

== M ==
Song	Composer/Arranger/Writer/Artist	Album	Year
"Mission"	Kim Junsu, Park Yoochun, Juno	Their Rooms "Our Story"	2011

== N ==
Song	Writer/Artist/Composer/Lyricist	Album	Year
"Nameless Song Part 1"	Park Yoochun	Their Rooms "Our Story"	2011
"Nine"	Kim Jaejoong	Their Rooms "Our Story"	2011
"No Gain"	Kim Jaejoong	Tarantallegra	2012

== O ==
Song	Writer/Artist	Album	Year
"Only One"	Sweetune	2014 Incheon Asiad Single	2013

== P ==
Song	Writer/Artist	Album	Year
"Pierrot"	Kim Jaejoong	Their Rooms "Our Story"	2011

== S ==
Song	Writer/Artist	Album	Year
"Still in Love"	Kim Jaejoong, Kyoko Hamler	The Beginning	2010
"So So"	Hoe Jang-nim, Jeong Jae-yeop, AQX	Just Us	2014

== T ==
Song	Writer/Artist	Album	Year
"Too Love"	Kim Junsu (solo)	Sungkyunkwan Scandal OST	2010
"To You It's Goodbye, To Me It's Waiting"	Kim Jaejoong (solo)	Sungkyunkwan Scandal OST	2010
"Thirty... (서른...)"	Park Yoochun, Kwon Bin-gi	Just Us	2014

== V ==
Song	Writer/Artist	Album	Year
"Valentine"	Chris Brown, Lonny Bereal	Just Us	2014

== W ==
Song	Writer/Artist	Album	Year
"W"	Shinjiroh Inoue, Daisuke Suzuki	The...	2010
"With you always"	Gorō Matsui, Reo	The...	2010

== Y ==
Song	Writer/Artist	Album	Year
"You're"	Kim Junsu	In Heaven	2011
"You Are So Beautiful"	Kim Junsu (solo)	Scent of a Woman OST	2011

== See also ==
- List of songs recorded by TVXQ
