= List of Gaon Album Chart number ones of 2011 =

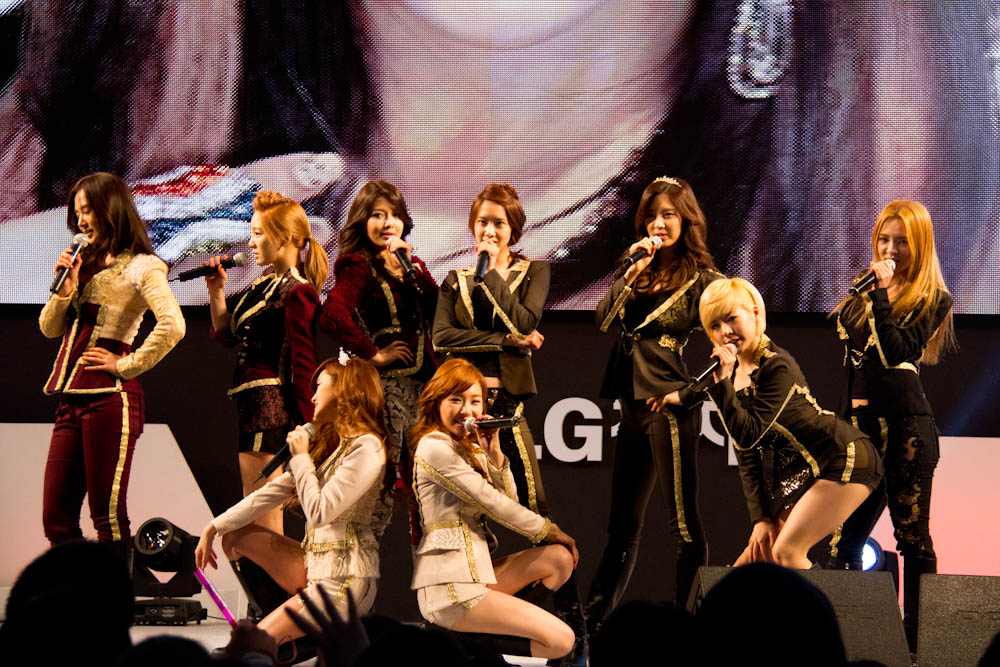
Girls' Generation's The Boys was the best-selling album of 2011 in South Korea.

The Gaon Album Chart was (Note: The chart has been renamed to Circle Album Chart, as part of the Circle Charts, since 2022) a South Korean record chart that ranked the best-selling albums and EPs in South Korea. It was part of the Gaon Music Chart, which launched in February 2010. The data are compiled by the Ministry of Culture, Sports and Tourism and the Korea Music Content Industry Association based upon weekly and monthly physical album sales by major South Korean distributors such as LOEN Entertainment, KT Music, Sony Music Korea, Warner Music Korea, Universal Music and Mnet Media.

In 2011, there were 44 albums which reached number one on the weekly chart. Girls' Generation, Big Bang, and JYJ topped the chart with three different albums each, more than any other act. CNBLUE, Kim Hyun-joong, and Super Junior each had two number one albums on the chart. The longest chart run on the weekly chart at number one was Girls' Generation's The Boys and Super Junior's Mr. Simple; both spent four weeks at the top of the chart. On the monthly chart, TVXQ and Big Bang had the most album number-ones, with two each. Girls' Generation's The Boys topped the monthly chart for three consecutive months from October to December.

Overall, Girls' Generation's The Boys was Gaon's best-selling album of 2011, selling 385,348 copies.

== Weekly charts ==
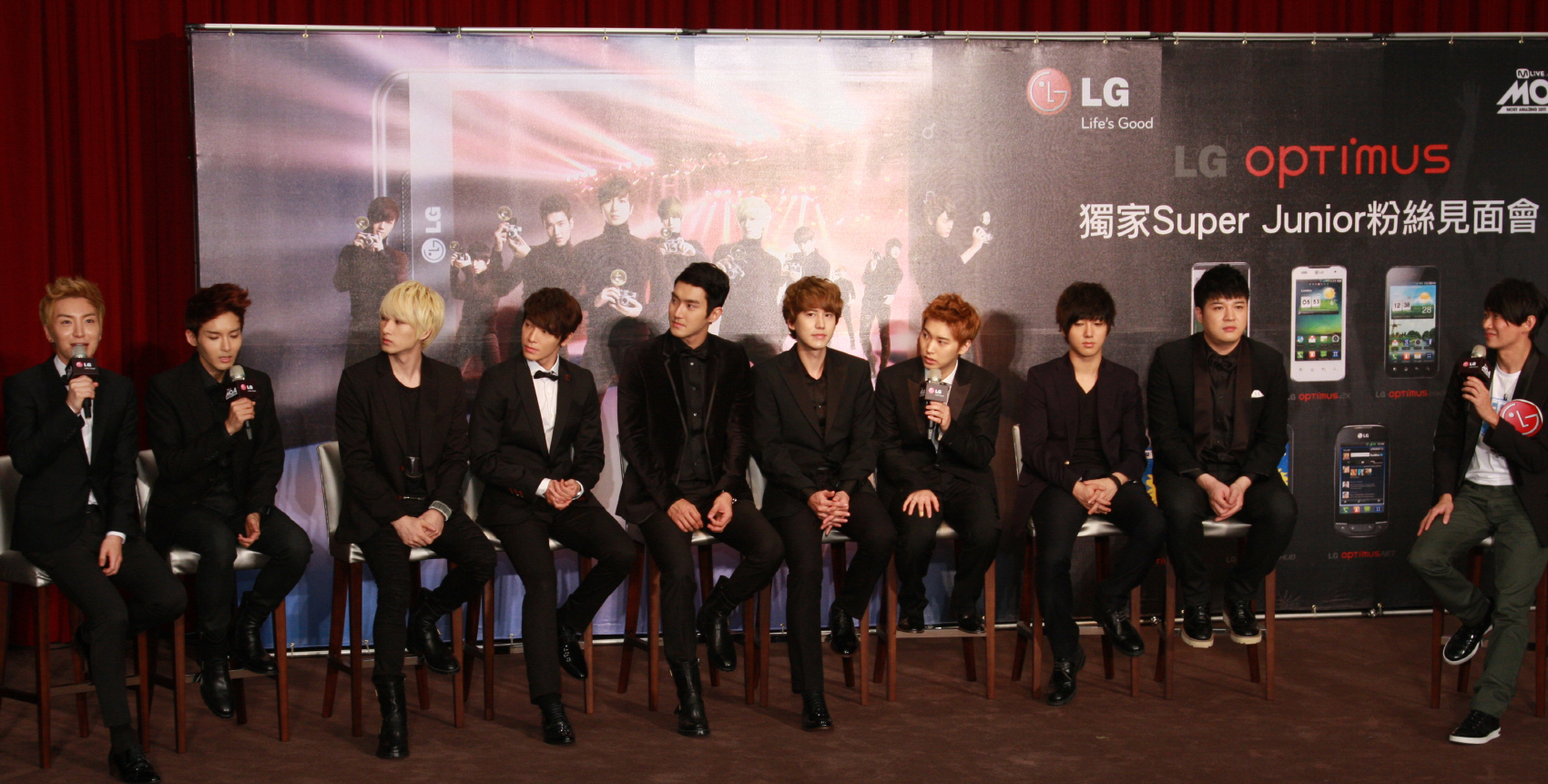
Super Junior earned two number-one albums on the weekly album chart, one of which, Mr. Simple, topped the chart for four non-consecutive weeks.

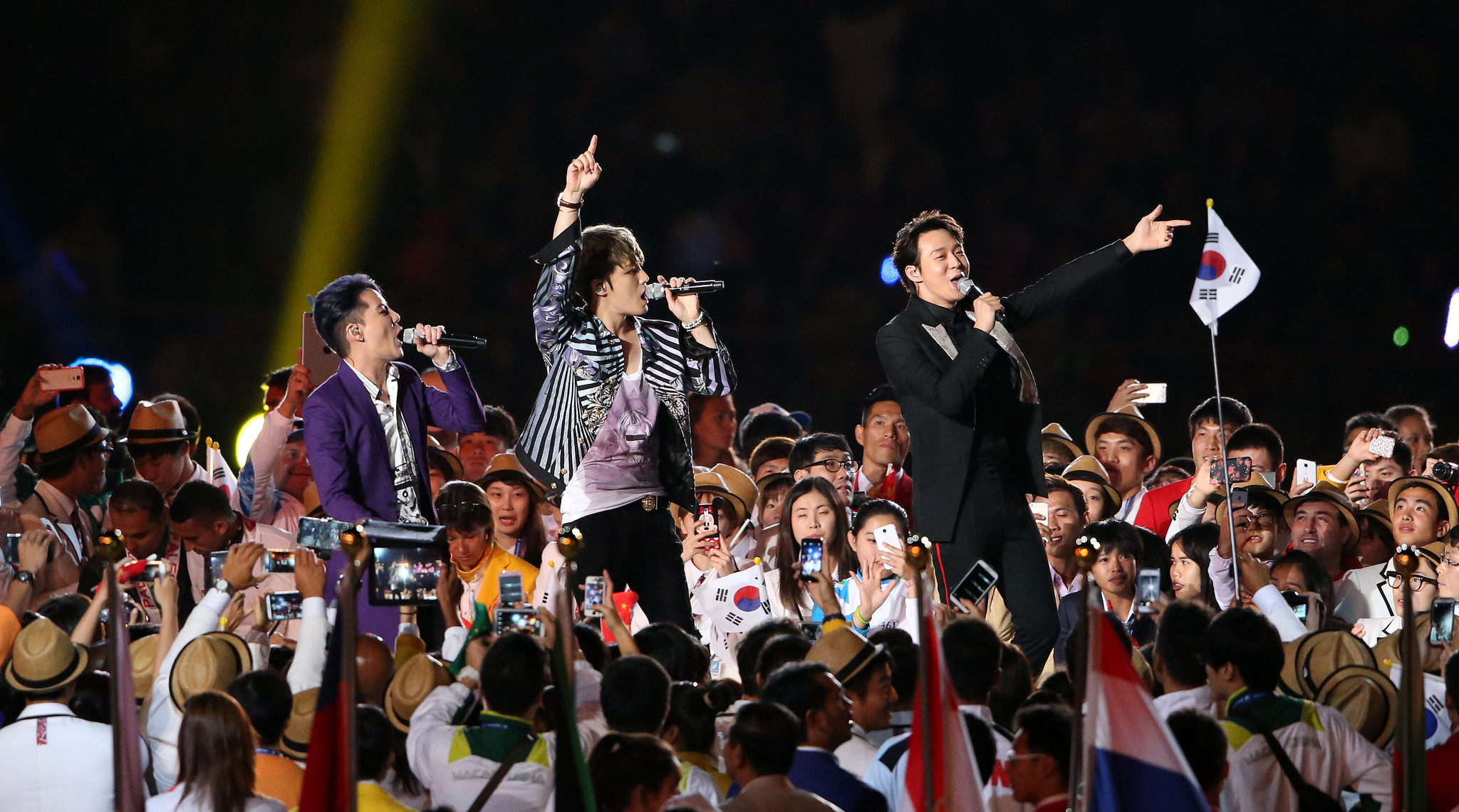
JYJ had three number-one albums in 2011.

Key
†	Indicates South Korean best-selling album of 2011

Week	Album	Artist	Ref.
December 25, 2010 (Note: This week was counted as the first week of 2011 by Gaon Music Chart.)	GD & TOP	GD & TOP	
January 1	The 1st Asia Tour Concert Into the New World	Girls' Generation	
January 8	Keep Your Head Down	TVXQ	
January 15	Keep Your Head Down	TVXQ	
January 22	VVIP	Seungri	
January 29	Secret Garden OST	Various artists	
February 5	Only One	U-KISS	
February 12	Kolleen Selects	Various artists	
February 19	The Beginning (Worldwide Concert In Seoul Edition)	JYJ	
February 26	Kolleen Selects	Various artists	
March 5	Tonight	Big Bang	
March 12	My Girl	Kim Hyung-jun	
March 19	Before U Go	TVXQ	
March 26	First Step	CNBLUE	
April 2	First Step	CNBLUE	
April 9	Big Bang Special Edition	Big Bang	
April 16	Big Bang Special Edition	Big Bang	
April 23	Pinocchio	f(x)	
April 30	First Step + Thank You	CNBLUE	
May 7	Feel Brand New	Eru	
May 14	Let It Go	Heo Young-saeng	
May 21	Mr. Taxi / Run Devil Run	Girls' Generation	
May 28	Return	F.T. Island	
June 4	Fiction and Fact	Beast	
June 11	Break Down	Kim Hyun-joong	
June 18	2011 Big Bang Live Concert 'BIG SHOW'	Big Bang	
June 25	Hands Up	2PM	
July 2	Infinity Challenge West Coast Highway	Various artists	
July 9	Miss Ripley OST	Various artists	
July 16	Mona Lisa	MBLAQ	
July 23	Infinity Challenge West Coast Highway	Various artists	
July 30	2NE1 2nd Mini Album	2NE1	
August 6	Mr. Simple	Super Junior	
August 13	Mr. Simple	Super Junior	
August 20	I Am Singer 1	Various artists	
August 27	Mr. Simple	Super Junior	
September 3	Mr. Simple	Super Junior	
September 10	STEP	Kara	
September 17	Vol. 7 The First	Sung Si-kyung	
September 24	A-Cha	Super Junior	
October 1	Paradise	Infinite	
October 8	In Heaven	JYJ	
October 15	Lucky	Kim Hyun-joong	
October 22	The Boys†	Girls' Generation	
October 29	The Boys†	Girls' Generation	
November 5	The Boys†	Girls' Generation	
November 12	Wonder World	Wonder Girls	
November 19	KimdongrYULE	Kim Dong-ryool	
November 26	In Heaven (Special Edition)	JYJ	
December 3	Last Fantasy	IU	
December 10	The Boys †	Girls' Generation	
December 17	2011 Winter SMTown – The Warmest Gift	SM Town	
December 24	You're Beautiful OST	Jang Keun-suk	

== Monthly charts ==
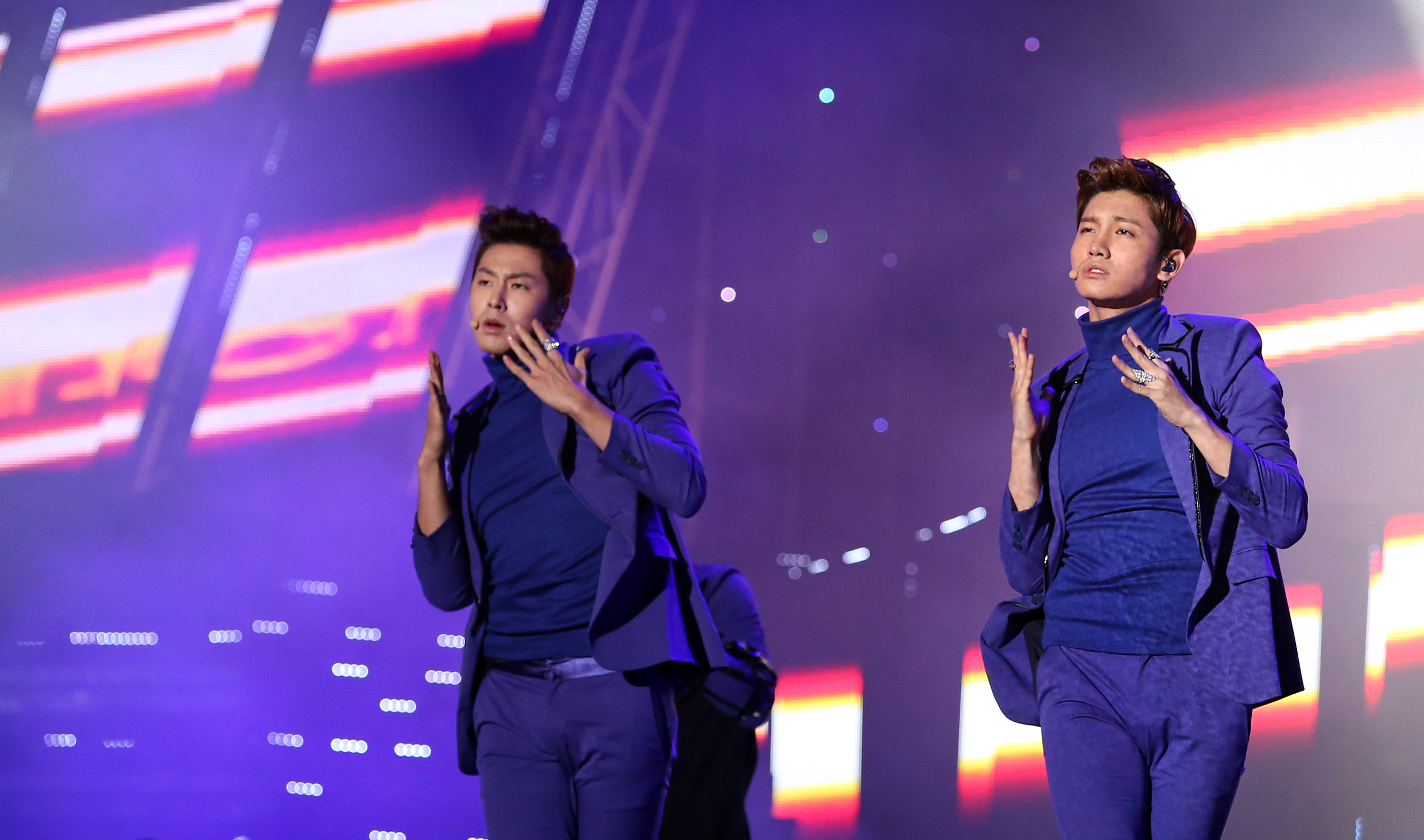
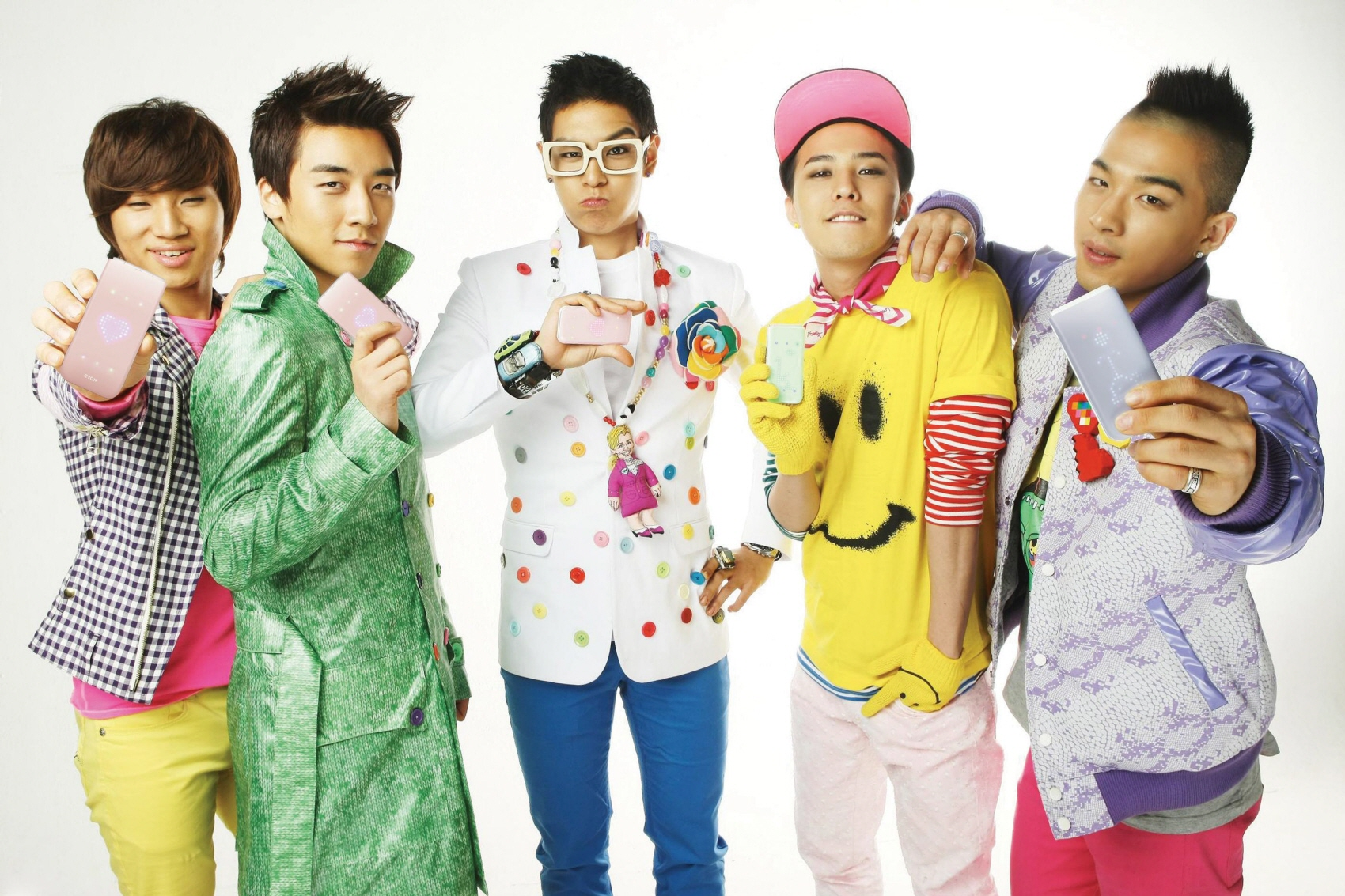
TVXQ (top) and Big Bang (bottom) both had two monthly number-one albums, more than any other act.

Key
†	Indicates South Korean best-selling album of 2011

Month	Album	Artist	Sales
January	Keep Your Head Down	TVXQ	230,227
February	Tonight	Big Bang	109,770
March	Before U Go	TVXQ	51,354
April	Big Bang Special Edition	Big Bang	72,139
May	Fiction and Fact	Beast	90,000
June	Break Down	Kim Hyun-joong	100,433
July	2NE1 2nd Mini Album	2NE1	54,900
August	Mr. Simple	Super Junior	287,427
September	In Heaven	JYJ	136,500
October	The Boys †	Girls' Generation	227,994
November	The Boys †	Girls' Generation	65,048
December	The Boys †	Girls' Generation	92,306
