= List of Gaon Album Chart number ones of 2010 =

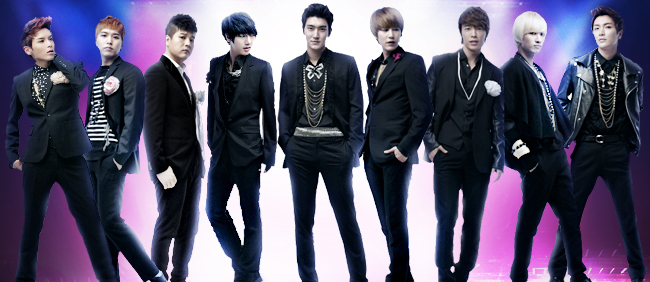
Super Junior's Bonamana was Gaon's best selling album of 2010.

The Gaon Album Chart is a record chart that ranks the best-selling albums and EPs in South Korea. It is part of the Gaon Music Chart which launched in February 2010. The data for the chart is compiled by the Ministry of Culture, Sports and Tourism and the Korean Music Content Industry Association based on weekly and monthly physical albums and digital sales by six major distributors: LOEN Entertainment, S.M. Entertainment, Sony Music Korea, Warner Music Korea, Universal Music and Mnet Media.

In 2010, there were 40 number one albums on the weekly chart. 2PM and Girls' Generation topped the weekly chart with three different albums each, more than any other act. On the monthly chart, Girls' Generation was the only act with three number ones, topping the chart with three different albums. Overall, Super Junior's Bonamana was Gaon's best selling album of 2010, selling 200,193 copies.

== Weekly chart ==
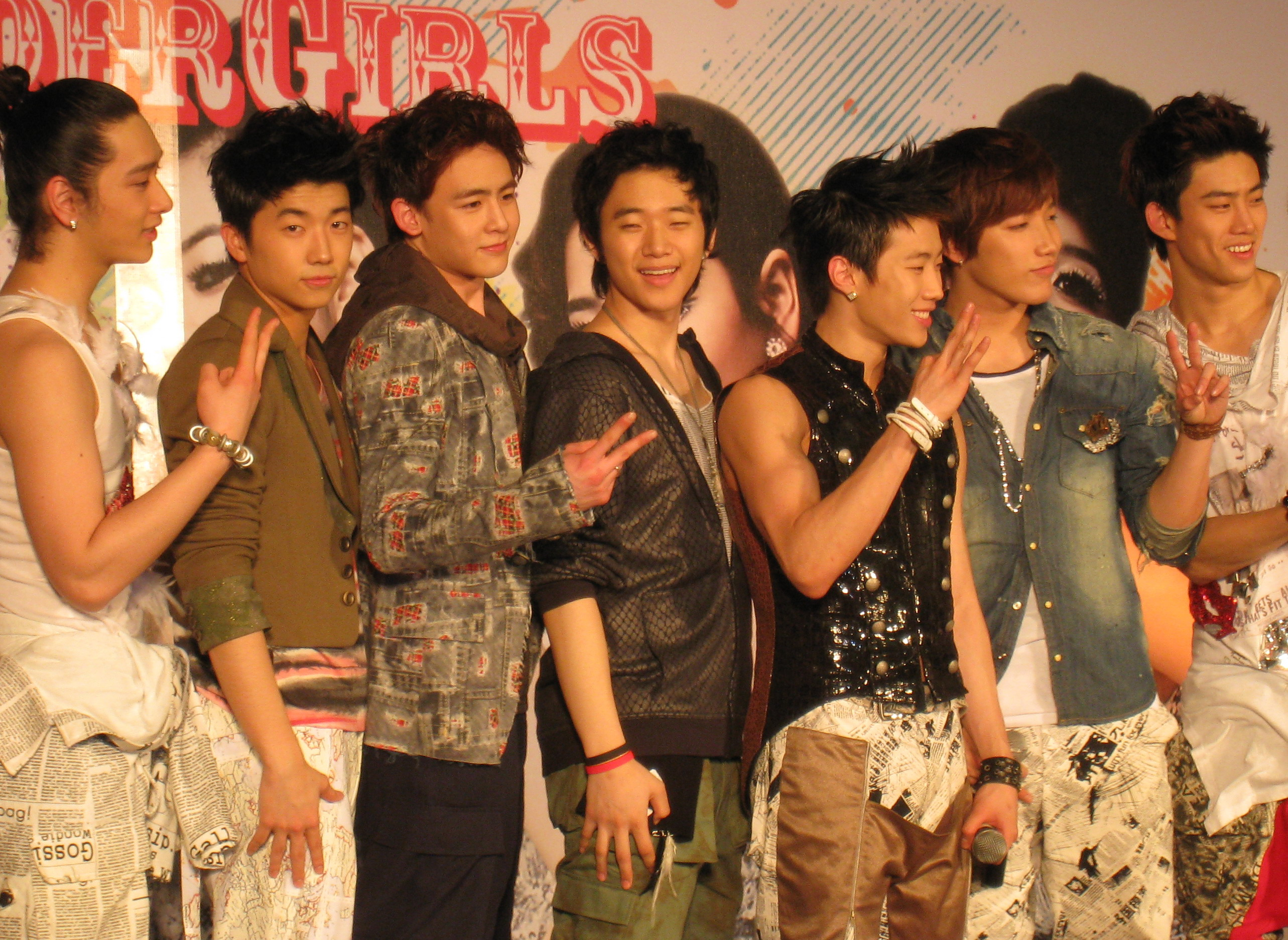
2PM (pictured), and Girls' Generation both had three number one albums in the weekly chart.

Key
| Indicates South Korean best-selling album of 2010 |

| Week | Album | Artist | Ref. |
|---|---|---|---|
| December 26, 2009 (Note: This week was counted as the first week of 2010 by Gaon Music Chart.) | 01:59PM | 2PM | |
| January 2 | 01:59PM | 2PM | |
| January 9 | 01:59PM | 2PM | |
| January 16 | Bluetory | CNBLUE | |
| January 23 | Bluetory | CNBLUE | |
| January 30 | Oh! | Girls' Generation | |
| February 6 | Oh! | Girls' Generation | |
| February 13 | Oh! | Girls' Generation | |
| February 20 | Lupin | Kara | |
| February 27 | Im Chang-jung Best (Korean: 임창정 베스트) | Im Chang-jung | |
| March 6 | Best Selection 2010 | TVXQ | |
| March 13 | Epilogue | Epik High | |
| March 20 | I Was Wrong | 2AM | |
| March 27 | Run Devil Run | Girls' Generation | |
| April 3 | Shine a Light | G-Dragon | |
| April 10 | Back to the Basic | Rain | |
| April 17 | Brilliant Legacy OST | Various Artists | |
| April 24 | Don't Stop Can't Stop | 2PM | |
| May 1 | Iris OST (Japanese release) | Various Artists | |
| May 8 | Lee Seung Chul 25th Anniversary (Korean: 이승철 25주년 기념 앨범) | Lee Seung-chul | |
| May 15 | Bonamana | Super Junior | |
| May 22 | Bonamana | Super Junior | |
| May 29 | Dreamizer | Lee Seung-hwan | |
| June 5 | Destination | SS501 | |
| June 12 | Destination | SS501 | |
| June 19 | Destination | SS501 | |
| June 26 | 2010 Big Show | BigBang | |
| July 3 | Bonamana (repackage) | Super Junior | |
| July 10 | Solar | Taeyang | |
| July 17 | Count On Me | Jay Park | |
| July 24 | Lucifer | Shinee | |
| July 31 | Lucifer | Shinee | |
| August 7 | Hurricane Venus | BoA | |
| August 14 | Hurricane Venus | BoA | |
| August 21 | Time to Shine | Supernova | |
| August 28 | Solar (International Release) | Taeyang | |
| September 4 | RealSlow is Back | Wheesung | |
| September 11 | To Anyone | 2NE1 | |
| September 18 | Sungkyunkwan Scandal OST | Various Artists | |
| September 25 | Rebirth | SS501 | |
| October 2 | Sungkyunkwan Scandal OST | Various Artists | |
| October 9 | Hello | Shinee | |
| October 16 | Still 02:00PM | 2PM | |
| October 23 | The Beginning | JYJ | |
| October 30 | Hoot | Girls' Generation | |
| November 6 | Hoot | Girls' Generation | |
| November 13 | Lights Go On Again | Beast | |
| November 20 | Jumping | Kara | |
| November 27 | The Beginning (New Limited Edition) | JYJ | |
| December 4 | Miss You (Korean: 너무 그리워) | SM the Ballad | |
| December 11 | Brown Eyed Soul | Brown Eyed Soul | |
| December 18 | Gift Pt. 2 | Park Hyo-shin | |

== Monthly chart ==
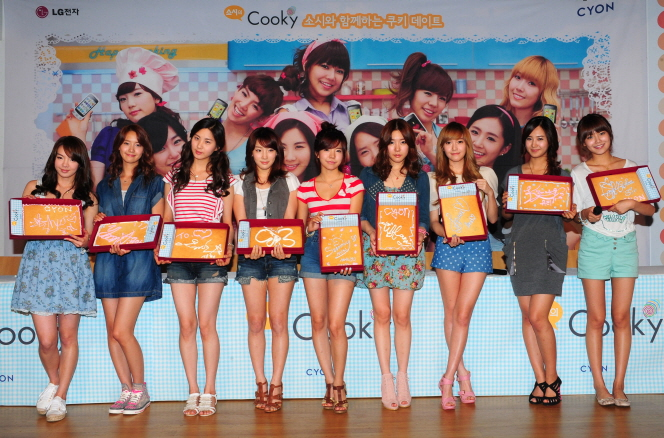
Girls' Generation (pictured) topped the monthly charts four times with three different albums.

Key
| Indicates South Korean best-selling album of 2010 |

| Month | Album | Artist | Ref. |
|---|---|---|---|
| January | Oh! | Girls' Generation | |
| February | Oh! | Girls' Generation | |
| March | Run Devil Run | Girls' Generation | |
| April | Back to the Basic | Rain | |
| May | Bonamana | Super Junior | |
| June | Bonamana (Repackage) | Super Junior | |
| July | Lucifer | SHINee | |
| August | Hurricane Venus | BoA | |
| September | To Anyone | 2NE1 | |
| October | Hoot | Girls' Generation | |
| November | The Beginning | JYJ | |
| December | GD & TOP | GD & TOP | |
