= Just Us (JYJ album) =

Studio album by JYJ
- Released: 29 July 2014
- Recorded: 2013–14
- Genres: K-pop; R&B; dance
- Language: Korean
- Labels: C-JeS; OGAM; LOEN

JYJ chronology
| In Heaven (2011) | Just Us (2014) |

Singles from Just Us
- 1. "Back Seat" Released: 29 July 2014

Just Us is the second and final Korean studio album (third overall) of South Korean band JYJ. The album was released digitally on July 29, 2014, and physically on August 1, 2014, by C-JeS Entertainment. American singer Chris Brown also produced a song for the album.

== Track listing ==
| No. | Title | Lyrics | Music | Arranger | Length |
|---|---|---|---|---|---|
| 1. | "Just Us" | | Park Il (박 일) | Park Il | 0:46 |
| 2. | "Back Seat" | Kim Tae-won (김태완), Dong Ne-hyeong (동네형), Won Yeong-heon (원영헌) | Kim Tae-won, Dong Ne-hyeong, Won Yeong-heon | Kim Tae-won, Dong Ne-hyeong, Won Yeong-heon | 3:10 |
| 3. | "Letting Go" | Junsu, Daryle “D.Brown” Oldham, Yoochun | Daryle “D.Brown” Oldham | Daryle “D.Brown” Oldham | 3:45 |
| 4. | "7살" (7 Years) | Michin Kamseong (미친감성), Im Han-byeol (임한별) | Michin Kamseong | Michin Kamseong | 3:41 |
| 5. | "Dad, You There?" | Yoochun, Daryle ‘D.Brown’ Oldham | Daryle ‘D.Brown’ Oldham, Gabriel Bello | Daryle ‘D.Brown’ Oldham | 4:29 |
| 6. | "So So" | Hoe Jang-nim (회장님), Jeong Jae-yeop (정재엽), AQX | Hoe Jang-nim, Jeong Jae-yeop, AQX | Hoe Jang-nim, Jeong Jae-yeop, AQX | 3:45 |
| 7. | "새벽 두시 반" (2:30 AM / Two Thirty in the Morning) | Michin Kamseong | Brandyn Burnette, Odd Jensen, Elisabeth Carew | Odd Jensen | 3:40 |
| 8. | "Let Me See" | Jaejoong | Hoe Jang-nim, 2JAJA, AQX | Hoe Jang-nim, 2JAJA, AQX | 3:36 |
| 9. | "서른.." (Thirty..) | Yoochun | Yoochun, Kwon Bin-gi (권빈기) | Kwon Bin-gi, Hwang Seong-su (황성수) | 3:37 |
| 10. | "Baboboy" | Jaejoong | Claire Sackwild, Tobias johansson, Jack Door | Jack Door | 3:28 |
| 11. | "Dear J" | Jaejoong | Hoe Jang-nim, Jeong Jae-yeop, AQX | Hoe Jang-nim, Jeong Jae-yeop, AQX | 3:39 |
| 12. | "Creation" | Jaejoong | Takashi Fukuda, Richard K & Edward K | Takashi Fukuda, Richard K & Edward K | 3:57 |
| 13. | "Valentine" | Chris Brown, Lonny Bereal | Lonny Bereal | Lonny Bereal | 3:32 |
| Total length: | | | | | 45:05 |

== Music videos ==
- Back Seat

== Release history ==
| Country | Date | Format | Distributing Label |
|---|---|---|---|
| South Korea | 29 July 2014 | Digital Download | C-JeS Entertainment (CD, digital); OGAM Entertainment (digital); LOEN Entertainment (CD) |
| South Korea | 1 August 2014 | CD | C-JeS Entertainment (CD, digital); OGAM Entertainment (digital); LOEN Entertainment (CD) |

== Chart positions ==
| Country | Chart | Peak position |
|---|---|---|
| South Korea | Gaon Monthly Album Chart | 1 |
| Japan | Oricon Weekly Albums Chart | 2 |
| United States | Billboard World Albums Chart | 4 |

== Sales ==
| Country | Chart | Sales |
|---|---|---|
| South Korea | Gaon Monthly Album Chart | 159,210 |
| Japan | Oricon Weekly Albums Chart | 44,866 |
