= In Heaven (album) =

2011 studio album by JYJ

- In Heaven (Brown Edition) cover

Studio album by JYJ
- Released: 15 September 2011
- Recorded: 2010–11
- Genre: K-pop; R&B; dance
- Language: Korean
- Label: C-JeS; A&G Modes

JYJ chronology
Their Rooms "Our Story" (2011)	In Heaven (2011)	Just Us (2014)

Singles from In Heaven
- 1. "Get Out" Released: 8 September 2011; 2. "In Heaven" Released: 15 September 2011

In Heaven is the first Korean studio album (second overall) by South Korean boy band JYJ. It was released on 28 September 2011 under C-JeS Entertainment with three covers: Red, Blue and Brown Editions, and a Black Edition a week later. It was released as digital format on 15 September 2011, and physical format (CD) on 28 September 2011.

A Special Edition was released on 21 November 2011 with two new remix tracks and bonus DVD containing music videos and behind-the-scene footages.

The music video for title track "In Heaven" features Kim Junsu and South Korean actress Song Ji-hyo. The single of it was released following the death of Park Yong-ha with his close friend Jaejoong.

== Reception ==
According to its agency, it sold 165,000 copies within 3 days of release and surpassed 450,000 sales mark.

The album peaked at number one on Gaon Weekly Album Chart for the week starting on 2 October 2011 and was the best-selling album on Gaon Monthly Album Chart for September with 100,433 sales and second for October with 81,867 sales.

The title track "In Heaven" debuted on Billboard's Korea K-Pop Hot 100 at number 10 for the week of 22 September 2011.

== Track listing ==
No.	Title	Lyrics	Music	Arranger	Length
1.	"Get Out"	Kim Jaejoong, Park Yoochun	Kim Jaejoong, Park Yoochun	Kim Jaejoong, Brian Kim, Yoo Seong-min	4:41
2.	"In Heaven"	Kim Jaejoong	Kim Jaejoong	Kim Jaejoong	4:50
3.	"낙엽" (Fallen Leaves)	Kim Junsu	Kim Junsu	Kim Junsu	4:27
4.	"소년의 편지" (Boy’s Letter)	Kim Jaejoong	Kim Hyung-seok	Kim Hyung-seok, Yoo Seong-min	5:20
5.	"Mission"	Juno	Kim Junsu	Kim Junsu	4:05
6.	"I.D.S" (I Deal Scenario)	Kim Jaejoong	Kim Jaejoong	Yang Jun-young	3:30
7.	"삐에로" (Pierrot)	Kim Jaejoong	Kim Jaejoong	Kim Jaejoong	4:27
8.	"You're"	Kim Junsu	Kim Hyung-seok	Yoo Seong-min	4:28
9.	"Nine"	Kim Jaejoong	Kim Jaejoong	Kim Jaejoong	5:09
10.	"이름없는 노래 Part1" (Nameless Song Part1)	Park Yoochun	Park Yoochun	Park Yoochun	8:04

Special Edition: Bonus Tracks
No.	Title	Length
11.	"Get Out" (Remix)	3:45
12.	"In Heaven" (Remix)	4:52

Special Edition: DVD
No.	Title	Length
1.	"Get Out M/V (original version)"
2.	"Get Out M/V (teaser version)"
3.	"Get Out (making film)"
4.	"In Heaven M/V (original version)"
5.	"In Heaven M/V (full version)"
6.	"In Heaven (making film)"
7.	"QR Movies full Version"
8.	"QR Movies making film"

== Music videos ==
- "In Heaven" - features Song Ji-hyo
- "Get Out"

== Release history ==
Country	Date	Format	Distributing Label
South Korea	15 September 2011	digital download	C-JeS Entertainment; A&G Modes
South Korea	28 September 2011	CD (Red, Blue and Brown Editions)	C-JeS Entertainment; A&G Modes
South Korea	5 October 2011	CD (Black Edition)	C-JeS Entertainment; A&G Modes
South Korea	21 November 2011	Special Edition (CD+DVD)	C-JeS Entertainment; A&G Modes

== Charts ==
=== Album chart ===
Chart	Country	Period	Peak position	Notes/Ref
Gaon Weekly Album Chart	South Korea	2–8 October 2011	#1	
Gaon Monthly Album Chart	South Korea	September	#1	100,433 sales
Gaon Monthly Album Chart	South Korea	October	#3	81,867
Five Music J-Pop/K-Pop Chart	Taiwan*	Week 40 (30 September – 6 October 2011)	#2	10.4% sales

* Available in Taiwan as imports

=== Single chart ===
Song	Peak chart position	
Song	KOR	KOR
Song	Gaon Chart	K-Pop Billboard
"Get Out"	8	10
"In Heaven"	5	10

==== Other songs charted ====
Song	Peak chart position	
Song	KOR	KOR
Song	Gaon Chart	K-Pop Billboard
"Boy's Letter"	31	43
"You're"	44	63
"Fallen Leaves"	49	66
"Mission"	62	93
"Nine"	71	-
"I.D.S"	74	-
"Pierrot"	76	-
