= Miss Ripley =

2011 South Korean television series

- Promotional poster for Miss Ripley
- Hangul: 미스 리플리
- RR: Miseu Ripeulli
- MR: Misŭ Rip'ŭlli
- Genre: Romance; Melodrama
- Created by: Han Hee for MBC
- Written by: Kim Sun-young
- Directed by: Choi Yi-sub; Choi Won-suk
- Starring: Lee Da-hae; Park Yuchun; Kim Seung-woo; Kang Hye-jung
- Country of origin: South Korea
- Original language: Korean
- No. of episodes: 16

Production
- Executive producers: Baek Chang-ju; Kim Dong-gu; Lee Sun-sang
- Production locations: South Korea; Japan
- Production companies: C-JeS Entertainment; Curtain Call Media; Miss Ripley SPC

Original release
- Network: MBC
- Release: May 30 – July 19, 2011

Miss Ripley (Korean: 미스 리플리) is a 2011 South Korean television drama series, starring Lee Da-hae, Park Yoo-chun, Kim Seung-woo and Kang Hye-jung. Loosely based on Shin Jeong-ah's case, it aired on MBC from May 30 to July 19, 2011 on Mondays and Tuesdays at 21:55 for 16 episodes.

== Plot ==
Jang Mi-ri (played by Le Da-Hae) works as a barmaid in a karaoke hall in Fukuoka, Japan, in order to pay off her father's debts and earn enough money to return to South Korea and find her biological mother Lee Hwa. (played by Choi Myung-gil). After an accidental car accident she meets Jang Myung-hoon (played by Kim Seung-woo), the president of a hotel in South Korea, who hires her after hearing her speak fluent Japanese- though she uses false university credentials in the process. At the same time, a man living in the same apartment complex as Mi-ri named Song Yoohyun (played by Park Yoochun), the son of a well-known Japanese resort president, falls in love with her at first sight. What follows is a tangled web of love and hate spun by the manipulative and deceitful Mi-ri as she does everything she can to climb to riches and glory.

== Cast ==
- Lee Da-hae as Jang Mi-ri
  - Park Ha-young as young Mi-ri
  - Jung Da-bin as teenage Mi-ri
- Park Yoo-chun as Yutaka / Song Yoo-hyun
- Kim Seung-woo as Jang Myung-hoon
- Kang Hye-jung as Moon Hee-joo
- Choi Myung-gil as Lee Hwa
- Kim Jung-tae as Hirayama
- Hwang Ji-hyun as Lee Gwi-yeon
- Lee Sang-yeob as Ha Chul-jin
- Song Jae-ho as President Lee
- Jang Yong as Song In-soo
- Kim Na-woon as Kang Shi-young
- Kim Chang-wan as Director Choi
- Baek Bong-ki as Deputy Manager Kim
- Lee Bo-ram as Jo Eun-bom
- Min Joon-hyun as Manager Han
- Park Ji-yeon as Yuu (cameo, ep 3)
- X-5 as themselves (cameo, ep 3)
- Yang Mi-kyung as Akiko Sakamoto, Yoo-hyun's mother
- Um Ki-joon as prosecutor (cameo)
- Maeng Sang-hoon

== Awards and nominations ==
Year	Award	Category	Recipient	Result	Ref
2012	The 48th Baeksang Arts Awards	Male Popularity Award - TV	Park Yoo chun	Won	
2012	The 48th Baeksang Arts Awards	Female Popularity Award - TV	Lee Da-hae	Nominated	
