= Their Rooms "Our Story" =

EP by JYJ
- Released: January 28, 2011 (South Korea)
- Recorded: 2010
- Genre: Dance-pop
- Length: 30:12
- Label: C-JeS
- Producer: JYJ

JYJ chronology
The Beginning (2010)	Their Rooms "Our Story" (2011)	In Heaven (2011)

Their Rooms "Our Story" is the debut Korean extended play (second overall) by South Korean pop group, JYJ. The album was released in digital and physical format by January 28, 2011.

It recorded 150,000 copies in pre-orders alone and reached number 1 in various charts. The album features six tracks that were all self-written and composed. The songs "삐에로 (Pierrot)" and "Nine" were first introduced on JYJ's world tour.

== Track listing ==
No.	Title	Lyrics	Music	Arranger	Length
1.	"Mission"	Juno	Xiah Junsu	Xiah Junsu	4:05
2.	"Nine"	Hero Jaejoong	Hero Jaejoong	Hero Jaejoong	5:09
3.	"삐에로" (Pierrot)	Hero Jaejoong	Hero Jaejoong	Hero Jaejoong	4:27
4.	"낙엽" (Fallen Leaves)	Xiah Junsu	Xiah Junsu	Xiah Junsu	5:01
5.	"I.D.S" (I Deal Scenario)	Hero Jaejoong	Hero Jaejoong	양준영	3:30
6.	"이름없는 노래 Part1" (Nameless Song Part1)	Micky Yuchun	Micky Yuchun	Micky Yuchun	8:04
Total length:					30:12
