= Park Yoo-chun =

South Korean singer-songwriter and actor (born 1986)

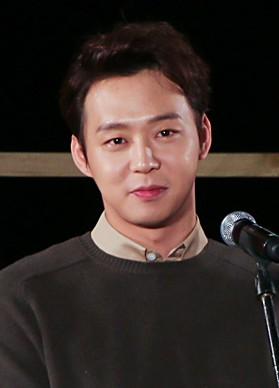
- Park in 2014
- Born: June 4, 1986 (age 40); Seoul, South Korea
- Other name: Yoochun
- Education: Kyung Hee University
- Occupations: Singer-songwriter; actor
- Relatives: Park Yu-hwan (brother)
- Musical career
- Genres: K-pop; R&B
- Instrument: Vocals
- Years active: 2003–present
- Labels: SM; C-JeS; Re:Cielo
- Formerly of: TVXQ; JYJ; SM Town

Korean name
- Hangul: 박유천
- Hanja: 朴裕千
- RR: Bak Yucheon
- MR: Pak Yuch'ŏn

Signature
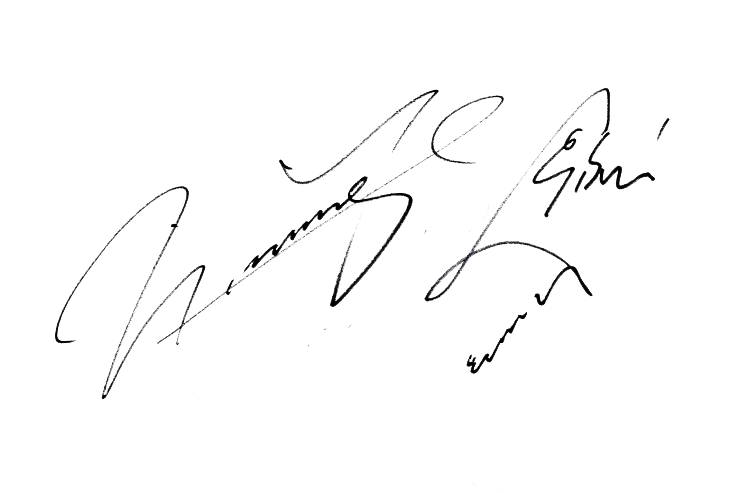

Park Yoo-chun (born June 4, 1986), formerly known as Micky Yoochun and better known by the mononym Yoochun, is a Korean-American singer-songwriter and actor. He is a member of the South Korean JYJ and former member of TVXQ. He has starred in dramas Sungkyunkwan Scandal (2010), Miss Ripley (2011), Rooftop Prince (2012), Missing You (2012), Three Days (2014), and A Girl Who Sees Smells (2015).

== Early life ==
Park was born on June 4, 1986, in Seoul, South Korea. His family moved to the United States in 1998. He lived in Fairfax, Virginia, where he attended Holmes Middle School, Rocky Run Middle School, and Chantilly High School.

In 2001, he won an award at the American Music Festival and then returned to Korea to prepare for his debut. After a relatively short training period of one year and five months, he made his debut as a member of the five-member male group TVXQ through SBS BoA & Britney Spears Special Stage on December 26, 2003.

Park Yoo-chun graduated Hanam High School in 2007 along with fellow members Kim Junsu. He attended Kyunghee Cyber University. His father, died on March 14, 2012. He has a younger brother, Park Yu-hwan, who is also an actor.

== Musical career ==
=== TVXQ ===
In 2003, Park returned to South Korea after he was scouted by Brothers Entertainment. He was later signed as an artist by S.M. Entertainment.

From 2003 to 2009, Park performed as a member of the best-selling K-pop boy band TVXQ. In July 2009, Park and two of his TVXQ bandmates, Jaejoong and Junsu, filed a lawsuit against their South Korean agency S.M. Entertainment. Through their lawyers, the members stated that the 13-year contract was excessively long, schedules were held out without the confirmation or permission of the members, contract terms have been extended and changed without their knowledge or consent and that the group's earnings were not fairly distributed to the members. After TVXQ's Japanese label announced a group hiatus in early 2010, they formed a new three-member group initially known as JUNSU/JAEJOONG/YUCHUN in Japan.

On November 28, 2012, the legal battle between JYJ and S.M. finally ended. Both sides agreed to retiring every judicial accusation against each other and not interfering in each other's actions.

=== JYJ ===
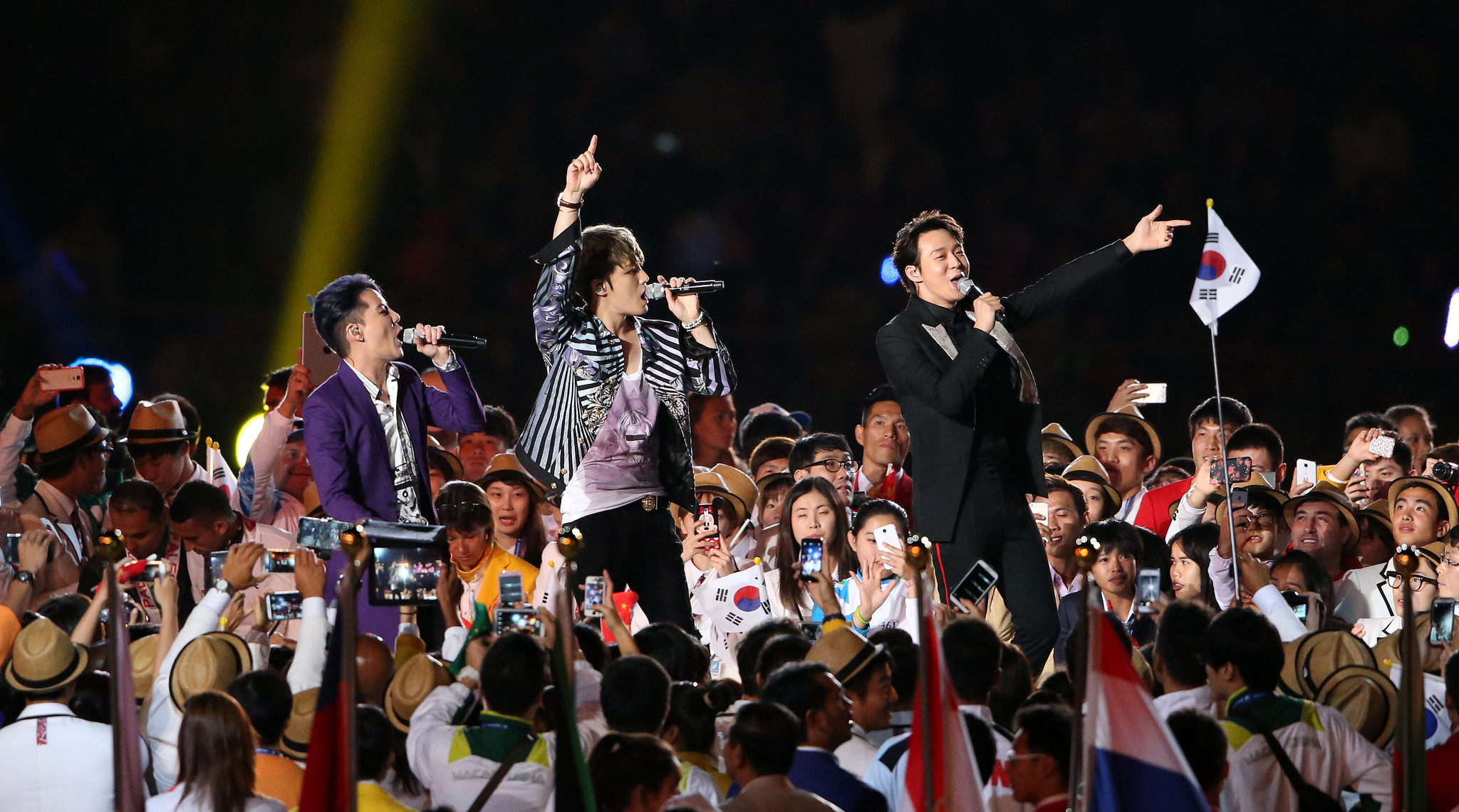
JYJ in 2014 Asian Games opening ceremony

In September 2010, JYJ released extended play The..., which debuted at number one on Japan's Oricon album charts. However, Avex had announced the suspension and when in Japan, the same month that year.

JYJ proceeded to release The Beginning, a global album which was sung in English. JYJ promoted the new album via a worldwide showcase tour throughout October and November with dates in South Korea, Southeast Asia and the United States.
On January 25, 2011, JYJ released Korean extended play Their Rooms "Our Story"." JYJ's second group album and first full-length Korean-language album In Heaven was released September 28, 2011.

Starting from April, Park toured Asia and North America for JYJ's first Worldwide Tour. The tour was then extended to Europe and South America, adding another four stops in Spain, Germany, Chile and Peru.

=== Solo career ===
Park is featured in "Tokyo Lovelight" from DJ Makai's mini-album, Stars. He was also one of the featured rappers on the song "Heartquake", a track from Super Junior's third album, Sorry, Sorry.

For Miss Ripley, Park sang "너를 위한 빈자리 (The Empty Space for You)". It appeared in the ninth episode of the drama and was released on the Miss Ripley OST (Part 3).

==== Songwriting ====
Park has written and composed several songs that have appeared on TVXQ's Korean and Japanese albums. As a member of SM Town, he contributed to the 2007 winter album Only Love with his composition "Evergreen". Park also wrote and composed "사랑 안녕 사랑 (Love Bye Love)", featured on the group's fourth Korean studio album Mirotic. For the Trick project, he wrote the lyrics to his solo "My Girlfriend", entirely in English.

"Kiss the Baby Sky", one of the A-side's for TVXQ's twenty-fifth Japanese single, marked the first time that one of the songs both written and composed by Park was released on a Japanese single.

With TVXQ members U-Know Yunho and Xiah Junsu, Park wrote the rap lyrics to "Love After Love", which appeared on their second Korean studio album, Rising Sun. For the group's Japanese releases, Park wrote and co-composed "Kiss Shita Mama, Sayonara" (Kissしたまま、さよなら, lit. As We Kiss, Goodbye) with Hero Jaejoong (Kim Jaejoong) for T, TVXQ's third Japanese album. In September 2009, he and Hero Jaejoong (Kim Jaejoong) released a self-written duet, "Colors (Melody and Harmony)/Shelter", which was used as the image song for Hello Kitty's 35th anniversary.

Park has also written songs for JYJ's albums. "I Love You", a track featured in JYJ's 2010 album The Beginning, was penned by Park. In January 2011, Park was the lyricist/composer in JYJ's music essay called Their Rooms "Our Story" for the song "이름없는 노래 Part 1 (A Song Without A Name, Part 1)". In addition, he also composed the rap in bandmate Junsu's song, "Xiahtic". For In Heaven, Park co-wrote "Get Out" with bandmate Kim Jaejoong.

==== 2018–2019: Japan activities and first studio album ====
Park confirmed to hold a fan meeting and mini concert titled "Reunion: Remember the Memories" on March 10 and 11, 2018 as his first public appearance after being discharged as a public service worker.

Park released his first studio album, Slow Dance, on February 27, 2019. Park had his first solo concert in Seoul on March 2, 2019, called 'Slow Dance in Seoul'.

Park's Slow Dance concert tour in Japan began in March 2019.

He announced his retirement from the entertainment industry in April 2019, following his arrest on suspicion of illegal drug use and the termination of his contract with his agency. Subsequently, instead of a prison sentence, a suspended sentence was handed down.

==== 2020–present: Comeback and change in companies ====
Park held a charity fanmeeting for the LOVE ASIA foundation in Bangkok, Thailand on January 25, 2020.

On July 31, 2020, it was announced that Park was working on a new album, which would be followed by a fan signing and mini concert in Thailand. The album, RE:mind, was released on 19 November 2020. It contains seven tracks: "The Cry", "Station", "Carousel", "What U Waiting For", "Somebody to Love Me", recorded in English, and "See You Again", recorded in Japanese and Thai.

After his departure from C-JeS Entertainment, Park Yoochun continued his solo activities through the agency The Number Nine which manages his activities in Thailand in cooperation with the label Re:Cielo and Yesperar which was granted exclusive management rights of the artist by Re:Cielo until July 2021.

On August 18, 2021, it was reported in a Japanese news article that Park had signed with a new agency due to his former agency (Re:Cielo) having "barely paid" him during his two years with the company, and claimed the company had embezzled funds. In response, Re:Cielo announced that Park's statements were entirely false and that they were preparing a civil damages lawsuit against him due to his breach of contract and defamation of the company. On August 27, 2021, another agency Yespera Co., Ltd revealed that Re:Cielo signed an exclusive contract that grants Yespera exclusive management rights of Park Yoochun with permission from the artist. For this reason, they filed an injunction against his broadcast and entertainment activities stating there was no reason to terminate his contract. On November 10, 2021, Park was temporarily banned from appearing on TV and continuing any activities in the entertainment industry (unless the activities were with Yespera but no mention of Re:Cielo) by the Seoul Central District Court.

In 2023, commemoration of the 20th anniversary of his debut, he held a fan meeting titled "Re.birth" from 9 to 10 November in Haneda and a dinner show titled "Rhythm -with one heart-" on 11 November in Yokohama. The prices of tickets to the events, 23,000 yen and 50,000 yen respectively, attracted criticism for their relative expense in comparison to popular K-pop groups' fan meetings.

== Acting career ==
Park's starting minor roles were with TVXQ, in Banjun Theater and Vacation.

In June 2010 Park began his official acting career by appearing in the Japanese BeeTV mobile drama Beautiful Love ～君がいれば～ (Beautiful Love ~If you were here ~) as Young-soo, the runaway heir of a conglomerate.

Two months later, Park made his Korean debut as an actor in the hit 2010 KBS drama Sungkyunkwan Scandal. He portrayed Lee Seon Joon, a wealthy, passionable and studious nobleman, who falls in love with his fellow schoolmate—a woman disguised as a man. He received the "Rookie of the Year" Award, "Netizen Award" and "Best Couple" Award at the 2010 KBS Drama Awards ceremony. He won "Best Newcomer Award" and "Most Popular Actor in a TV Drama" at The 47th Baeksang Arts Awards, the most prestigious entertainment awards in South Korea. Park also won "Best Actor" and "Most Popular Asian Actor" at the 6th Seoul International Drama Awards.

In 2011, he starred in the MBC drama Miss Ripley with Lee Da-hae, Kim Seung-woo, and Kang Hye-jung. His character as Song Yoo-hyun has him playing a half-Korean, half-Japanese second-generation director who will falls blindly in love with the antiheroine. At the 2011 MBC Drama Awards, Park won "Best Newcomer" for his role as lead male in "Miss Ripley."

In 2012, he starred in the SBS drama Rooftop Prince with Han Ji-min. Park's third role was Lee Gak, a Joseon era prince who time-travels 300 years to the present day, and also as Yong Tae-yong, third generation of conglomerate. The drama started airing on March 21, 2012. On August 30, Park won "Most Popular Actor in TV Drama" at the 48th Baeksang Arts Awards, crowning him as the most popular actor for two years in row.

On November 7, 2012, Park returned to television by participating in his fourth drama, MBC's Missing You, in which he portrays homicide detective Han Jung-woo who, in the past when he was fourteen years old, was separated from his first love.

Having played the main character in a SBS and a MBC drama during 2012, Park attended both networks' drama award shows. At the MBC Drama Awards on December 30, the actor won the "Excellence Actor in a Mini-Series" Award for his role in Missing You. At the SBS Drama Awards the following day on the 31st, he received four more awards--"Excellence Actor in a Drama Special", one of the "Top 10 Stars", "Best Couple" (shared with Han Ji-min), and the "Netizen Popularity" Award—at the SBS Drama Awards for his performance in popular drama Rooftop Prince.

He has since achieved a so-called "Grand Slam" by having won trophies from each of South Korea's three major television channels, SBS, MBC, and KBS.

In 2014 and 2015 he won the title of "Best New Actor" for his performance in Haemoo at numerous entertainment awards, including the Baeksang Arts Awards, the Blue Dragon Awards, the Daejong Film Awards, the Busan International Film Festival and the SACF Beautiful Artists Awards.

== Personal life ==
=== Relationships ===
In April 2017, it was confirmed by Park's agency that he was engaged to Namyang Dairy Products heiress, Hwang Ha-na. On May 15, 2018, the couple was reported to have ended their relationship.

=== Sexual assault allegations ===
In 2016 and 2017, Yoo-chun was accused by four different women of sexual assault, but was acquitted after the police ruled it was difficult to prove the use of force, making the charges invalid. The case was later forwarded to Seoul Central District Prosecutors Office and he was also cleared of all sexual assault charges. One of Yoo-chun's accusers was ruled to have falsified the charges, and was sentenced to two years in prison. In 2017, another one of Yoo-chun's accusers ("A") was found to be not guilty of false accusations and defamation. The prosecutor of this defamation case attempted to appeal this decision but the appeal was denied. In 2018, "A" filed for a civil suit for damages against Yoo-chun for 100 million won in compensation and requested for his officetel to be seized. The court has ordered to settle their suit through mandatory mediation with the Seoul Court Mediation Center ruling in July 2019 that Yoo-chun should pay "A" 50 million won instead. Because Park Yoo-Chun did not send his objection to the proposal within the given two weeks deadline the terms are accepted by default and solidified the amount he must compensate. Yoo-chun initially failed to pay the compensation, and was brought to a detention judgement trial in 2020. During the trial, Yoo-chun was given a "non-punishment" ruling, meaning "the punishment is unfair or that the debtor proved that he was meeting his obligations by the date of the trial". In February 2021, it was announced that Yoo-chun had paid the compensation in full.

=== Drug use allegations and related charges ===
On April 26, 2019, Park was arrested on suspicion of purchasing and using methamphetamine. He was also suspected of attempting to destroy evidence by dyeing and shaving the hair from his body before undergoing the drug test. Park's agency, C-JeS Entertainment, announced that his contract would be terminated and that he would retire from the industry. According to news reports, Park admitted the drug charges against him after initially having repeatedly denied the accusations. On July 2, 2019, Park was sentenced to ten months imprisonment, suspended for two years and a fine of 1.4 million won. He has since completed his probation without violations.

=== Tax evasion controversy ===
On December 14, 2023, Park was included in a list of tax defaulters released by the National Tax Service. His 5 evasions of 409 million won in taxes, including capital gains taxes, dated back to 2016.

== Discography ==
=== Solo appearances ===
Year	Title	Song	Duration	Artist
2009	Makai's Album Stars	"Tokyo Lovelight"	05:31	DJ Makai feat. Yuchun
2011	Miss Ripley OST	"An Empty Space for You"	03.20	Park Yoochun
2014	Gummy's Album I Loved.. Have No Regrets	"Let's take a trip" (놀러가자)	03:33	Gummy feat. Yuchun

Solo Korean
Year	Songs	Album title	Release date
2016	"How Much Love Do You Have In Your Wallet"	How Much Love Do You Have In Your Wallet	January 18, 2016
2019	"Slow Dance"	Slow Dance	February 27, 2019
2020	"The Cry"	RE:mind	November 19, 2020
2021	"You...(Kiss Your Sky)"	Da Capo	November 5, 2021

Solo Japanese
Year	Songs	Album title	Release date
2024	"Clock"	Where I Walk	December 13, 2024
2025	"Moon"	Metro Love	August 20, 2025
2026	"153cm"	Slide	July 1, 2026

== Filmography ==
=== Film ===
Year	Title	Role	Notes/Ref.
2005	Dating on Earth	Park Yoochun	
2014	Haemoo	Dong-shik	
2017	Lucid Dream	Mysterious man	
2022	On the Edge	Tae-hong	Independent Film

=== Television series ===
Year	Title	Role	Notes
2005	Rainbow Romance	Yoochun	
2005	Banjun Drama	High school student	
2005	Banjun Drama	Masked fencer, slave	
2006	Banjun Drama	Himself	
2006	Vacation	Himself	
2010	Beautiful Love: If You're Here	Young-soo	Japanese drama
2010	Sungkyunkwan Scandal	Lee Sun-joon	
2011	Miss Ripley	Song Yoo-hyun / Yutaka	
2012	Rooftop Prince	Lee Gak / Yong Tae-yong	
2012	Missing You	Han Jung-woo	
2014	Three Days	Han Tae-kyung	
2015	A Girl Who Sees Smells	Choi Mu-gak	

=== Narration ===
Year	Title	Note
2011	The Hometown in Which I Used to Live	Documentary about small towns
2014	Human Documentary Love - Ep. 4	Documentary about conjoined twins
2015	기적의 피아노 / The Piano	Documentary film about a visually-impaired piano child prodigy

=== Radio show ===
Year	Title	Notes
2007	TVXQ Bigeastation	Park acted as the host with TVXQ

== Awards and nominations ==
Year	Awards	Category	Nominated work	Result	Ref.
2001	American Singing Competition (Virginia)	Best Artist of the Competition	—N/a	Won	
2003	KBN Teens Singing Competition	Special Award	—N/a	Won	
2010	KBS Drama Awards	Best New Actor	Sungkyunkwan Scandal	Won	
2010	KBS Drama Awards	Netizen Award	Sungkyunkwan Scandal	Won	
2010	KBS Drama Awards	Best Couple Award (with Park Min-young)	Sungkyunkwan Scandal	Won	
2011	47th Baeksang Arts Awards	Best New Actor (TV)	Sungkyunkwan Scandal	Won	
2011	47th Baeksang Arts Awards	Most Popular Actor (TV)	Sungkyunkwan Scandal	Won	
2011	6th Seoul International Drama Awards	People's Choice Award (Korea)	Sungkyunkwan Scandal	Won	
2011	6th Seoul International Drama Awards	Outstanding Korean Actor	Sungkyunkwan Scandal	Won	
2011	7th Korea Drama Awards	Best New Actor	Sungkyunkwan Scandal, Miss Ripley	Nominated	
2011	MBC Drama Awards	Best New Actor	Miss Ripley	Won	
2012	48th Baeksang Arts Awards	Most Popular Actor (TV)	Miss Ripley	Won	
2012	K-Star News Awards	Best Idol Actor (voted by children)	—N/a	Won	
2012	7th Seoul International Drama Awards	People's Choice Award (Korea)	Rooftop Prince	Won	
2012	7th Seoul International Drama Awards	Outstanding Korean Actor	Rooftop Prince	Won	
2012	SBS Drama Awards	Excellence Award, Actor in a Drama Special	Rooftop Prince	Won	
2012	SBS Drama Awards	Netizen Popularity Award	Rooftop Prince	Won	
2012	SBS Drama Awards	Top 10 Stars	Rooftop Prince	Won	
2012	SBS Drama Awards	Best Couple Award (with Han Ji-min)	Rooftop Prince	Won	
2012	MBC Drama Awards	Excellence Award, Actor in a Miniseries	Missing You	Won	
2012	MBC Drama Awards	Popularity Award	Missing You	Nominated	
2012	MBC Drama Awards	Best Couple Award (with Yoon Eun-hye)	Missing You	Nominated	
2013	49th Baeksang Arts Awards	Most Popular Actor (TV)	Missing You	Won	
2014	3rd APAN Star Awards	Excellence Award, Actor in a Miniseries	Three Days	Nominated	
2014	34th Korean Association of Film Critics Awards	Best New Actor	Haemoo	Won	
2014	51st Grand Bell Awards	Best New Actor	Haemoo	Won	
2014	15th Busan Film Critics Awards	Best New Actor	Haemoo	Won	
2014	4th SACF Beautiful Artists Awards	Best New Actor	Haemoo	Won	
2014	Star Night Showbiz Awards	Popular Star Award	Haemoo	Won	
2014	35th Blue Dragon Film Awards	Best New Actor	Haemoo	Won	
2014	SBS Drama Awards	Top Excellence Award, Actor in a Miniseries	Three Days	Won	
2014	SBS Drama Awards	Top 10 Stars	Three Days	Won	
2014	SBS Drama Awards	Netizen Popularity Award	Three Days	Nominated	
2014	SBS Drama Awards	Best Couple Award (with Park Ha-sun)	Three Days	Nominated	
2015	6th Korea Film Reporters Association (KOFRA) Film Awards	Best New Actor	Haemoo	Won	
2015	10th Max Movie Awards	Best Actor	Haemoo	Nominated	
2015	10th Max Movie Awards	Best New Actor	Haemoo	Won	
2015	51st Baeksang Arts Awards	Best New Actor (Film)	Haemoo	Won	
2015	24th Buil Film Awards	Best New Actor	Haemoo	Nominated	
2015	8th Korea Drama Awards	Top Excellence Award, Actor in a Miniseries	A Girl Who Sees Smells	Nominated	
2015	SBS Drama Awards	Top Excellence Award, Actor in a Miniseries	A Girl Who Sees Smells	Won	
2015	SBS Drama Awards	Top 10 Stars	A Girl Who Sees Smells	Won	
2021	Las Vegas Asian Film Awards	Best Actor	On The Edge	Won	

== Tours ==
Year	Tour	Dates	Venue
2012	Park Yuchun 1st Asia Fanmeeting Tour	August 25; September 8; September 14; September 16	Shanghai, China (Shanghai Arena) with 5,000 attendees; Shenzhen, China (Shenzhen Bay Sports Center) with 4,000(?) attendees; Taipei, Taiwan (National Taiwan University Sports Center) with 4,000 attendees; Bangkok, Thailand (Royal Paragon Hall) with 5,000 attendees
2014	Park Yuchun Fanmeeting Housewarming Party	June 4; June 14; June 29	Seoul, Korea (Korea International Exhibition Center) with 6004 attendees; Guangzhou, China (Guangzhou Gymnasium) with 5000 attendees; Shanghai, China (Mercedes-Benz Arena (Shanghai)) with 4000 attendees
2015	Park Yuchun Fanmeeting Tour Loving Yu in China	February 7; February 14; March 1	Beijing, China (Olympic Sports Centre (Beijing)); Chengdu, China (University of Electronic Science and Technology of China); Shanghai, China (Shanghai Indoor Stadium)
2015	2015 Park Yuchun Fanmeeting Japan Tour ′ALL ABOUT YU	June 30 (Osaka); July 1 (Osaka); July 11 (Nagoya); July 12 (Nagoya); July 22 (Yokohama); July 23 (Yokohama)	Osaka, Japan (Osaka-jō Hall); Nagoya, Japan (Nippon Gaishi Hall); Yokohama, Japan (Yokohama Arena)
2018	Remember the memories	March 10 (Tokyo); March 11 (Tokyo)	Tokyo, Japan (Musashino Forest Sports Plaza)
