= Rooftop Prince =

2012 South Korean television series

- Promotional poster
- Also known as: Attic Prince
- Hangul: 옥탑방 왕세자
- Hanja: 屋塔房 王世子
- RR: Oktapbang wangseja
- MR: Okt'appang wangseja
- Genre: Romance; Comedy; Drama; Time travel
- Written by: Lee Hee-myung
- Directed by: Shin Yoon-sub
- Starring: Park Yoo-chun; Han Ji-min; Jeong Yu-mi; Lee Tae-sung; Jung Suk-won; Choi Woo-shik; Lee Tae-ri; Lee Moon-sik
- Theme music composer: Kim Ji-soo
- Opening theme: "Rooftop Prince (Title)"
- Ending theme: "A Happy Ending" by Jay Park "After a Long Time" by Baek Ji-young
- Country of origin: South Korea
- Original language: Korean
- No. of episodes: 20

Production
- Executive producer: Son Jun-hyun
- Producer: Kim Yong-jin
- Production locations: South Korea; New York City, United States
- Running time: 70 minutes Wednesdays and Thursdays at 21:55 (KST)
- Production company: SBS Plus

Original release
- Network: Seoul Broadcasting System
- Release: 21 March – 24 May 2012

Rooftop Prince (Korean: 옥탑방 왕세자; RR: Oktapbang wangseja) is a 2012 South Korean fantasy romantic comedy television drama, starring Park Yoo-chun, Han Ji-min, Jeong Yu-mi, Lee Tae-sung, Lee Tae-ri, Jung Suk-won, and Choi Woo-shik.

It is about a Joseon crown prince who, after his wife dies mysteriously, time travels to the future where he encounters familiar faces, modern-day devices, and corporate intrigue. The series aired on SBS from March 21 to May 24, 2012 on Wednesdays and Thursdays at 21:55 for 20 episodes. It is available on Netflix.

== Synopsis ==
Yong Tae-mu (Lee Tae-sung), after killing his lost cousin in the United States, returns to Korea, claiming that his cousin, Yong Tae-yong (Park Yoochun), could not be found in New York City. Meanwhile, Tae-mu has been having a secret affair with Hong Se-na (Jeong Yu-mi), his secretary, who, in turn, runs into her long-lost stepsister Park-ha (Han Ji-min). Park-ha has been missing for a prolonged period of time and it is revealed that she was in the US after Se-na abandoned her in a truck driving away when she was nine.

Two years after Tae-yong's disappearance, four men dressed in Joseon-era garments fall onto Park-ha's rooftop house. Hungry, homeless and having nowhere to go, the four men decide to stick with Park-ha. Their leader, Lee-gak claims to be the Crown Prince of Joseon (Park Yoochun), along with his entourage – scholar Song Man-bo (Lee Tae-ri), personal bodyguard Woo Yong-sool (Jung Suk-won), and palace eunuch Do Chi-san (Choi Woo-shik). One day, Crown Prince Lee Gak sees Se-na who is the spitting image of his beloved wife, who was found drowned in the 18th century. He is convinced she is his wife's reincarnation. Meanwhile, Yeo (Ban Hyo-jung), a wealthy president of a large company, mistakes Lee Gak for her grandson, Yong Tae-yong, because of their exact same appearance, and believes that her long lost grandson has finally returned. Lee Gak realizes that he has time traveled 300 years to 2012, Seoul, to search for the truth behind the mysterious death of the late Crown Princess. In order to approach Se-na, who is also President Yeo's personal assistant, Lee Gak pretends that he is Tae-yong. Tae-mu, believing that he already killed his cousin in New York, lives in constant fear of his devious act being discovered by the family and "Tae-yong" (aka Lee Gak) who claims not to have remembered the event. Tae-mu has always been jealous of Tae-yong's favored position in the family.

On the other hand, Park-ha is shocked by the news that her new friend who calls himself the Crown Prince is, in fact, the grandson of the CEO. But before long, her feelings for Lee Gak blossom and she is hurt when she finds out that Lee Gak, who still holds very tender memories of his dead wife, is courting Se-na. Lee Gak also believes that marrying Se-na in Seoul in the year 2012 would bring him closer to solving the mystery of the Crown Princess' murder in the Joseon era.

== Cast ==
=== Main ===
- Park Yoo-chun as Crown Prince Lee Gak / Yong Tae-yong
  - Choi Won-hong as Young Lee Gak

He is the Crown Prince in the Joseon era. He is intelligent, kind, wise, and cautious and exercises good judgment, though he is a little pompous and prone to think highly of himself (as might be expected of a member of the Royal Family). The Crown Prince finds himself time travelling 300 years into the future and confronts considerable challenges as he adapts to 21st-century Seoul and Park-ha. His modern era counterpart, Tae-yong, was left for dead by his cousin Tae-mu, after Tae-mu pushed him into the sea at the start of the episode. Lee Gak starts to impersonate as Tae-yong as he realizes that the Joseon era and the modern era bear similarities that will bring him closer to solving his wife's death. (Lee Gak in initial episodes wears a red tracksuit.)

- Han Ji-min as Park-ha / Hong Bu-yong
  - Jeon Min-seo as Young Bu-yong / Young Park-ha

Strong, resilient and having an optimistic personality, Park-ha has endured many hardships and trials since she was separated from her family at age 9. She has been looking out for herself ever since. She helps Lee Gak and his entourage to live in the modern era after they appear at her home. Her Joseon era counterpart, Bu-yong, is the shy, elegant and smart younger sister of the Crown Princess Hwa-yong who harbors strong feelings towards the Crown Prince. She was supposed to be the betrothed of Lee Gak, until her face was burned by Hwa-yong and thus the opportunity to become the Crown Princess was passed to her older sister and she forced herself to wear a face mask to hide the scar on her cheek.

- Jeong Yu-mi as Hong Se-na / Hong Hwa-yong
  - Kim So-hyun as Young Hwa-yong / Young Se-na

Se-na is Park-ha's older stepsister. She works as the secretary at the company owned by Tae-yong and Tae-mu's grandmother. Ambitious, evil, scheming, and hating Park-Ha, she has relied on Tae-mu in the past to advance herself. She resents Park-ha and has made her sister's life difficult. As Hwa-yong, she is Lee Gak's wife, the Crown Princess, and Bu-yong's older sister.

- Lee Tae-sung as Yong Tae-mu / Prince Muchang

Tae-yong's cousin and Se-na's secret lover. He holds a high position in the company and lacks neither skills nor industry. Tae-yong's and Tae-mu's grandfather had an affair with another woman, resulting in the birth of Tae-mu's father (an illegitimate child). Because there is no blood relation between Tae-yong's grandmother, who is also the CEO of the company, Tae-mu has always been sidestepped in favor of Tae-yong. Smart and ruthless, he resorts to whatever means necessary to get what he wants. His Joseon era counterpart (as revealed in the last episode), Prince Muchang, is Lee Gak's half-brother.

- Lee Tae-ri (Note: Credited as Lee Min-ho.) as Song Man-bo

One of Lee Gak's entourage. A child prodigy, he has become proficient in all fields of study by age 22. However, because he is an illegitimate child, he cannot sit for any government exams and thus, cannot take a position as officer. Because his future prospects seem hopeless, he has abandoned the study of the classics for an immoral lifestyle until Crown Prince Lee Gak enlists his help to solve the Crown Princess' murder. (In the initial episodes, he wears the green tracksuit.)

- Jung Suk-won as Woo Yong-sool

One of Lee Gak's entourage. He murdered the nobleman who killed his mother and raped his sister, as well as the nobleman's guard of about 15 others. He is a skilled swordsman. When later questioned by Lee Gak, he says that he learned to fight in order to protect the innocent, his nation and his king. His intentions are true and the Crown Prince saved him from the executioner's axe and appoints him as his personal bodyguard. (In the initial episodes, he wears the blue tracksuit.)

- Choi Woo-shik as Do Chi-san

One of Lee Gak's entourage. Smooth with the ladies and skilled with men, Chi-san works at the largest brothel in Joseon. From the palace to the bedroom, Chi-san is wise in the ways of the world. Lee Gak appoints him as palace eunuch to discover what the people are saying about the Crown Princess' murder. (In the initial episodes, he wears the yellow tracksuit.)

=== Supporting ===
- Kim Yu-seok as the King, Lee Gak's father
- Kil Yong-woo as Lord Hong Man-pil, Bu-yong and Hwa-yong's father and Left State Minister of Joseon.
- Kyeon Mi-ri as Lady Jeong, Bu-yong and Hwa-yong's mother.
- Song Ok-sook as Gong Man-ok, Se-na's mother and Park-ha's stepmother.
- Maeng Sang-hoon as Park In-cheol, Park-ha's father
- Na Young-hee as President Jang Seon-joo, Park-ha's mother
- Kim Hyung-bum as Officer Hong Nak-hyeon, Bu-yong and Hwa-yong's brother and head of the royal police
- Kang Byul as Lady Mimi
- Guzal Tursunova as Becky
- Ban Hyo-jung as Chairman Yeo, chairman of the Home & Shopping Network, and Tae-yong's grandmother
- Ahn Suk-hwan as Yong Dong-man, Tae-mu's father
- Park Joon-geum as Yong Seol-hee, Dong-man's aunt
- Lee Moon-sik as Pyo Taek-soo

== Production ==
Prior to the script reading, the main actors were required to undertake a camera test dressed in traditional costumes. The first script reading occurred at the SBS Ilsan Production Center on February 1, 2012.

Filming for Rooftop Prince began on February 4, 2012. On February 7, 2012, a traditional wedding scene was filmed at Gyeonghuigung in Seoul, involving the young Crown Prince Lee Gak and Hwa Yong.

Filming was temporarily rescheduled due to the passing of Park Yoochun's father on March 13, however Park resumed work on March 17 as the pilot episode was scheduled to air on the 21st.

== Original soundtrack ==
To date, three EPs and one album have been released.

=== Rooftop Prince OST Part 1 ===
Rooftop Prince OST Part 1

EP by Baek Ji-young & Ali
- Released: March 22, 2012
- Genres: Soundtrack, drama
- Label: SBS Contents Hub

Baek Ji-young & Ali chronology
Rooftop Prince OST Part 1 (2012)	Rooftop Prince OST Part 2 (2012)

No.	Title	Performer(s)	Length
1.	"After a Long Time" ("한참 지나서")	Baek Ji-young	3:20
2.	"Hurt" ("상처")	Ali	4:01
3.	"After a Long Time (Instrumental)" ("한참 지나서 (Inst.)")		3:21
4.	"Hurt (Instrumental)" ("상처 (Inst.)")		4:01

=== Rooftop Prince OST Part 2 ===
Rooftop Prince OST Part 2

EP by Jay Park
- Released: March 29, 2012
- Genres: Soundtrack, drama
- Label: SBS Contents Hub

Jay Park chronology
Rooftop Prince OST Part 1 (2012)	Rooftop Prince OST Part 2 (2012)	Rooftop Prince OST Vol. 1 (2012)

No.	Title	Performer(s)	Length
1.	"A Happy Ending" ("해피엔딩")	Jay Park	3:14
2.	"A Happy Ending (Instrumental)" ("해피엔딩 (Inst.)")		3:14

=== Rooftop Prince OST Vol. 1 ===
Rooftop Prince OST Vol. 1

Soundtrack album by Various artists
- Released: April 19, 2012
- Genres: Soundtrack, drama
- Label: SBS Contents Hub

Various artists chronology
Rooftop Prince OST Part 2 (2012)	Rooftop Prince OST Vol. 1 (2012)	Rooftop Prince OST Part 3 (2012)

No.	Title	Performer(s)	Length
1.	"After a Long Time" ("한참 지나서")	Baek Ji-young	3:22
2.	"Hurt" ("상처")	Ali	4:03
3.	"A Happy Ending" ("해피엔딩")	Jay Park	3:16
4.	"Buyongji yeonmot" ("부용지 연못")		1:55
5.	"Bin" ("빈")		1:51
6.	"Oktapbangwangseja (Title)" ("옥탑방 왕세자 (Title)")		1:22
7.	"Jjoljjori 4inbang" ("쫄쫄이 4인방")		2:31
8.	"Seoul Nadeuri" ("서울 나들이")		1:25
9.	"Geumsohwadongsuk" ("금소화동숙")		2:27
10.	"Susukkekki" ("수수께끼")		1:46
11.	"After a Long Time" ("한참지나서 (Inst.)")		3:22
12.	"Hurt (Instrumental)" ("상처 (Inst.)")		4:03
13.	"A Happy Ending (Instrumental)" ("해피엔딩 (Inst.)")		3:14

=== Rooftop Prince OST Part 3 ===
Rooftop Prince OST Part 3

Soundtrack album by Various artists
- Released: April 27, 2012
- Genres: Soundtrack, drama
- Label: SBS Contents Hub

Various artists chronology
Rooftop Prince OST Vol. 1 (2012)	Rooftop Prince OST Part 3 (2012)

No.	Title	Performer(s)	Length
1.	"After a Long Time" ("한참 지나서")	Cho Eun	3:22 or 3:25
2.	"Even Under the Sky" ("어느 하늘 아래 있어도")	Park Ki-young	3:45
3.	"Andante"	Jiin	4:02
4.	"Difficult Love" ("사랑은 어려워")	Twilight	3:31
5.	"Shine" ("비춰줄께")	Kilgu Bong-gu	3:22
6.	"After a Long Time (Instrumental)" ("한참 지나서 (Inst.)")		3:22
7.	"Even Under the Sky (Instrumental)" ("어느 하늘 아래 있어도 (Inst.)")		3:45
8.	"Andante (Instrumental)"		4:02
9.	"Ohhh Lalala (Instrumental)" ("사랑은 어려워 (Inst.)")		3:31
10.	"Shine (Instrumental)" ("비춰줄께 (Inst.)")		3:22

== Ratings ==
Ep.	Original broadcast date	Average audience share			
Ep.	Original broadcast date	TNmS Ratings		AGB Ratings	
Ep.	Original broadcast date	Nationwide	Seoul	Nationwide	Seoul
1	March 21, 2012	8.7%	9.7%	9.8%	11.3%
2	March 22, 2012	12.0%	14.0%	10.5%	11.7%
3	March 28, 2012	10.2%	11.2%	11.2%	12.3%
4	March 29, 2012	11.1%	12.9%	11.4%	12.7%
5	April 4, 2012	10.9%	12.1%	11.2%	12.5%
6	April 5, 2012	14.2%	16.9%	12.5%	14.0%
7	April 12, 2012	12.1%	13.5%	12.5%	14.2%
8	April 18, 2012	11.6%	14.8%	11.4%	12.2%
9	April 19, 2012	11.8%	13.7%	12.0%	13.4%
10	April 19, 2012	11.2%	14.3%	10.4%	11.9%
11	April 25, 2012	11.6%	13.0%	10.6%	11.4%
12	April 26, 2012	12.3%	13.7%	11.3%	12.4%
13	May 2, 2012	11.5%	14.1%	10.3%	11.1%
14	May 3, 2012	12.0%	14.0%	11.6%	12.5%
15	May 9, 2012	11.4%	13.2%	11.6%	13.0%
16	May 10, 2012	12.4%	14.5%	12.5%	13.8%
17	May 16, 2012	13.8%	16.1%	11.8%	12.7%
18	May 17, 2012	13.5%	16.0%	12.1%	12.9%
19	May 23, 2012	15.1%	17.3%	12.8%	13.8%
20	May 24, 2012	14.9%	16.2%	14.8%	15.7%
Average		12.1%	14.1%	11.6%	12.8%

Despite average ratings in South Korea, the drama was popular overseas, especially in China and Japan. Fans from 35 countries have visited the filming set.

== Awards and nominations ==
Year	Award	Category	Recipient	Result
2012	7th Seoul International Drama Awards	Best Korean Drama	Rooftop Prince	N/A
2012	7th Seoul International Drama Awards	Outstanding Korean Actor	Park Yuchun	N/A
2012	7th Seoul International Drama Awards	Outstanding Korean Actress	Han Ji-min	N/A
2012	7th Seoul International Drama Awards	People's Choice	Park Yuchun	N/A
2012	5th Korea Drama Awards	Top Excellence Award, Actress	Han Ji-min	Won
2012	2012 SBS Drama Awards	Top Excellence Award, Actress in a Drama Special	Han Ji-min	Won
2012	2012 SBS Drama Awards	Excellence Award, Actor in a Drama Special	Park Yuchun	Won
2012	2012 SBS Drama Awards	Excellence Award, Actress in a Drama Special	Jeong Yu-mi	Won
2012	2012 SBS Drama Awards	Top 10 Stars	Park Yuchun	Won
2012	2012 SBS Drama Awards	Top 10 Stars	Han Ji-min	Won
2012	2012 SBS Drama Awards	Popularity Award	Park Yuchun	Won
2012	2012 SBS Drama Awards	Best Couple Award	Park Yuchun and Han Ji-min	Won
