= The... =

- CD+DVD version cover

EP by Junsu/Jejung/Yuchun
- Released: September 8, 2010
- Recorded: 2010
- Genre: J-pop; R&B
- Length: 20:06
- Label: Rhythm Zone

Junsu/Jejung/Yuchun chronology
The... (2010)	The Beginning (2010)

The... is the debut extended play by South Korean boyband JYJ (then using the name Junsu/Jejung/Yuchun), a group formed of three of the five members of TVXQ. A Japanese-language EP, it was released in 2010 under Rhythm Zone, the band's former Japanese label as a part of TVXQ. The release was commercially successful, reaching number one on Oricon's weekly albums chart.

The DVD featured rehearsal footage for their Thanksgiving Live in Dome concerts.

== Individual song charting ==
Prior to the album's release, the Thanksgiving Live in Dome live versions of the four tracks were released as digital downloads. During this release, the songs charted on RIAJ's Digital Track Chart, with "W" ranking at #19, "Itsudatte Kimi ni" at #20, "Get Ready at #66 and "Long Way" at #80. When the studio versions of the songs were released in September as digital downloads, "Itsudatte Kimi ni" peaked at #35 and "W" at #48, however the other two songs or the remixes did not chart.

== Track listing ==
No.	Title	Writer(s)	Arranger	Length
1.	"Itsudatte Kimi ni" (いつだって君に "Always for You")	Gorō Matsui, Reo	Reo	5:26
2.	"Get Ready"	H.U.B., H-Wonder	H-Wonder	4:31
3.	"Long Way"	H.U.B., Denise Rich, Q.Worthy, Andrea Martin	Q.Worthy	4:02
4.	"W"	Shinjiroh Inoue, Daisuke Suzuki	Daisuke Kahara	6:07
Total length:				20:06

CD only version bonus tracks
No.	Title	Writer(s)	Arranger	Length
5.	"Itsudatte Kimi ni (Floor on the Intelligence Remix)"	Matsui, Reo	Floor on the Intelligence	5:29
6.	"Get Ready (Caramel Pod Remix)"	H.U.B., H-Wonder	Caramel Pod	8:00
7.	"Long Way (Daishi Dance Remix)"	H.U.B., Rich, Q.Worthy, Andrea Martin	Daishi Dance	5:16
8.	"W (The Big Sky in the East Ver.)"	Shinjirō Inoue, Daisuke Suzuki	Big Sky	6:04
9.	"Itsudatte Kimi ni (Thanksgiving Live in Dome Ver.)"	Matsui, Reo		5:41
10.	"Get Ready (Thanksgiving Live in Dome Ver.)"	H.U.B., H-Wonder		5:56
11.	"Long Way (Thanksgiving Live in Dome Ver.)"	H.U.B., Rich, Q.Worthy, Andrea Martin		4:20
12.	"W (Thanksgiving Live in Dome Ver.)"	Shinjirō Inoue, Daisuke Suzuki		6:16
Total length:				1:07:08

CD+DVD version bonus tracks
No.	Title	Writer(s)	Arranger	Length
5.	"Itsudatte Kimi ni (Instrumental)"	Matsui, Reo	Reo	5:25
6.	"Get Ready (Instrumental)"	H.U.B., H-Wonder	H-Wonder	4:31
7.	"Long Way (Instrumental)"	H.U.B., Rich, Q.Worthy, Andrea Martin	Q.Worthy	4:02
8.	"W (Instrumental)"	Shinjirō Inoue, Daisuke Suzuki	Kahara	6:02
Total length:				40:06

DVD
No.	Title	Length
1.	"Thanksgiving Live in Dome Rehearsal Movie"
2.	"いつだって君に Special Movie"
Total length:		25:00

== Chart rankings ==
Chart (2010)	Peak position
Oricon daily albums	1
Oricon weekly albums	1
Oricon yearly albums	42

=== Reported sales and certifications ===
Chart	Amount
Japanese physical sales	175,000
RIAJ shipping certification	Gold (100,000)

== Release history ==
Region	Date	Format	Distributing Label
Japan	September 8, 2010	CD, CD+DVD, digital download	Rhythm Zone
Japan	September 25, 2010	Rental CD	Rhythm Zone
