= The Beginning (JYJ album) =

Studio album by JYJ
- Released: October 14, 2010
- Recorded: 2010
- Genre: Pop; R&B
- Length: 29:16
- Label: C-JeS; Show Sharp; Vitamin

JYJ chronology
The... (2010)	The Beginning (2010)	Their Rooms "Our Story" (2011)

Singles from The Beginning
- 1. "Ayyy Girl feat. Kanye West, Malik Yusef" Released: October 19, 2010; 2. "Empty" Released: 2010

The Beginning is the debut studio album by South Korean pop group JYJ, formed by three of the five original members of TVXQ. It is the group's first English release, after their 2010 Japanese language extended play The.... It was released on October 14, 2010 through Vitamin Entertainment, a division of Warner Music Korea.

Two weeks before the release of the album in South Korea, 50,000 copies of the regular edition had been pre-ordered and pre-sales for the 99,999 copies of the special edition of The Beginning reached numbers of 400,000 requests.

The album was released on November 16, 2010 in the United States as a digital download, and a wider release, planned by the group for early 2011, did not materialize.

== Background and development ==
Despite the album being sung in English, Jaejoong and Junsu were not fluent in English at the time of recording, and were still attending English lessons at the time of the album's release in America.

== Promotion ==
The first single from the album was "Ayyy Girl," featuring Kanye West and Malik Yusef. The song had moderate success in South Korea, peaking at No. 19 on Gaon's single charts. The music video for the album's second single, "Empty," was shot in December. The song debuted at No. 18 in Korea during the album's release, due to strong digital sales.

The band toured Asia in October and November 2010 in promotion of the album. This began with two showcases in Seoul on October 12, at the 11,000 seating Hwaseong Tiger Dome at Korea University. The tickets for these events sold out in 15 minutes, and a portion of the profits was donated to World Vision. The band planned concerts in the United States in New York Las Vegas and Los Angeles, however were denied P1 visas for these concerts. In response to this, the group performed free showcases on these dates and refunded ticket purchasers. JYJ's management, C-JeS Entertainment, was unsure of the reason for the visa denial. The band's other planned US dates in Seattle, San Francisco and Hawaii were later cancelled. 6,400 people attended the New York showcase, despite the venue being able to hold 3,400 people.

The band was featured in Billboard magazine's release of the week in November, the first time an international act has been featured. This led to the magazine's website receiving its highest daily traffic day recorded, as of 2010.

== Legal injunction ==
The band members' previous record label as the band TVXQ, SM Entertainment, filed an injunction against the sales of the album on October 8. However, South Korean digital retailers defied the request, and proceeded with the sales on October 14. The injunction was issued due to the South Korean courts not having reached a verdict on the members' ongoing court case with SM Entertainment. In December 2010 they were successful in their lawsuit against SM Entertainment.

== Track listing ==
No.	Title	Lyrics	Music	Length
1.	"Intro"	S. Tiger	Brian Kim, BJD	0:47
2.	"Ayyy Girl" (featuring Kanye West, Malik Yusef)	Kyoko Hamler, P. Phenom, Kanye West, Yusef	Warren Taylor, Hamler, Phenom, West, Hassan Khaffaf, Jeff Bhasker, No I.D, Plain Pat	4:31
3.	"Empty"	L. Daniels, Hamler, T. Parker	Rodney Jerkins	3:35
4.	"Be My Babe/Be My Girl"	Daniels, Hamler, Parker	Jerkins	3:16
5.	"Still in Love"	Hamler	Hero Jaejoong	4:22
6.	"I Love You" (featuring Flowsik)	Hamler, Flowsik	Micky Yuchun	4:54
7.	"I Can Soar"	Hamler	Xiah Junsu	4:40
8.	"Be the One"	Jae Chong, Hamler	Jae Chong	3:11
Total length:				29:16

US Edition: Bonus Tracks
No.	Title	Length
9.	"Empty (DJ Eon Remix)"	4:00
Total length:		33:16

Korea Limited Edition: Bonus Tracks
No.	Title	Length
9.	"Ayyy Girl (DJ Eon Remix)"	4:03
10.	"Empty (DJ Eon Remix)"	4:00
Total length:		34:19

Korea Special Edition: Bonus Tracks
No.	Title	Length
9.	"Ayyy Girl (DJ Eon Remix)"	4:03
10.	"Empty (DJ Eon Remix)"	4:00
11.	"Be My Girl (DJ Eon Remix)"	4:00
Total length:		41:19

== Chart ==
=== Album chart positions ===
Chart	Peak position
South Korea Gaon Chart	1
South Korea Gaon Chart monthly	1
Japan Oricon	11

=== Reported sales ===
Chart	Amount
Japanese physical sales	62,000
South Korean sales	398,000

*Sales figure is based on South Korean imports of the album, as the album has not been released domestically in Japan currently.

== Release history ==
Region	Date	Format	Distributing Label
South Korea	October 14, 2010	CD, digital download	Vitamin Entertainment
South Korea	October 18, 2010	"Luxury Package" CD	Vitamin Entertainment
United States	November 16, 2010	Digital download	Show Sharp
South Korea	November 22, 2010	Re-released CD	Vitamin Entertainment
