= JYJ =

South Korean boy band

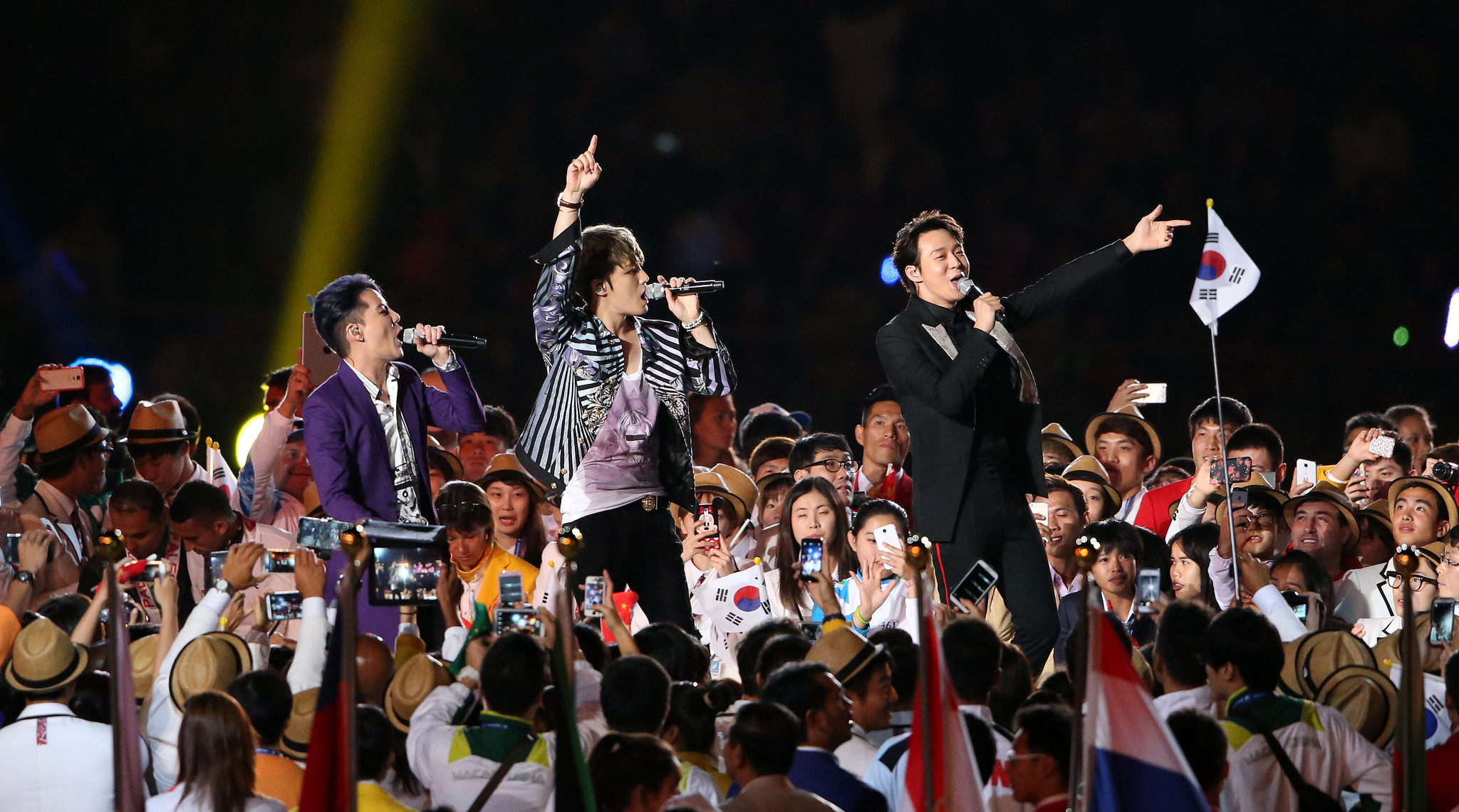
- JYJ at the 2014 Asian Games opening ceremony. From left to right: Kim Junsu, Kim Jae-joong, and Park Yoo-chun.

Background information
- Also known as: Junsu/Jejung/Yuchun (2010)
- Origin: South Korea
- Genres: K-pop; dance; R&B
- Years active: 2010–2016
- Labels: C-JeS; A&G Modes; Vitamin; LOEN; Rhythm Zone
- Spinoffs: JX
- Spinoff of: TVXQ
- Past members: Jaejoong; Yoochun; Junsu
- Website: c-jes.com

JYJ (formerly known as Junsu/Jejung/Yuchun in Japan) were a South Korean boy band formed in 2010 by Kim Junsu, Kim Jae-joong, and Park Yoo-chun, the three former members of TVXQ. Their group name is taken from the initial letters of each member's names. The group was formerly managed by C-JeS Entertainment in Korea.

In April 2010, they released their debut record, the Japanese EP The..., which topped the Japanese Oricon daily ranking Albums Chart. Their subsequent releases, including their global debut album, The Beginning (2010) and their second studio album and first Korean full-length album, In Heaven (2011), all debuted at number one on the Korean Gaon Album Chart. JYJ is the first K-pop group to perform in Chile and Peru.

== History ==
=== 2010: Debut as JYJ, first Japanese tour and The Beginning ===
The three-member group was announced in April 2010 by Rhythm Zone, a sub-label of Avex. The group performed two rounds of lives: the four-day Thanksgiving Live in Dome concerts at Osaka Dome and Tokyo Dome in June, and performances at the nationwide a-nation tour throughout August. The group's debut release, The..., was released in September 2010, and debuted at number one on Oricon albums charts with 240,000 copies sold in the first week. The DVD for their Thanksgiving Live in Dome concerts sold 116,000 copies the first week after being released. Both the album and DVD debuted at № 1 on Oricon's DVD and album chart in the same week.

In September 2010, Avex Entertainment announced plans to suspend all of JYJ's Japanese activities. Avex claimed this stemmed from issues the label had with the president of the group's Korean management, C-JeS Entertainment. JYJ stated it was a conflict over new terms demanded by Avex in contract renegotiation.

The group released their English-language global debut album under Warner Music Asia, The Beginning, on October 12, with the Kanye West-produced single "Ayyy Girl" as lead track. Two weeks before the release of the album, 500,000 copies of The Beginning had been pre-ordered and pre-sales for the 99,999 copies of the special edition of the album reached 400,000 requests. JYJ promoted the new album via a worldwide showcase tour throughout October and November with dates in South Korea, Southeast Asia and the United States. On November 27 and 28, they launched JYJ Worldwide Concert in Seoul, a two-day concert that was held at Seoul's Jamsil Olympic Stadium with a total seating of 100,000 (50,000 for each show). It was directed by the American concert producer Jeri Slaughter.

In spite of a ban in the Entertainment Departments of South Korea's three main terrestrial broadcasters, JYJ had their first public broadcast performance on December 31, 2010, at the 2010 KBS Drama Awards. They sang 찾았다 "Found You" – a ballad track from the drama Sungkyunkwan Scandal which starred member Yoochun.

=== 2011: In Heaven and first worldwide tour ===
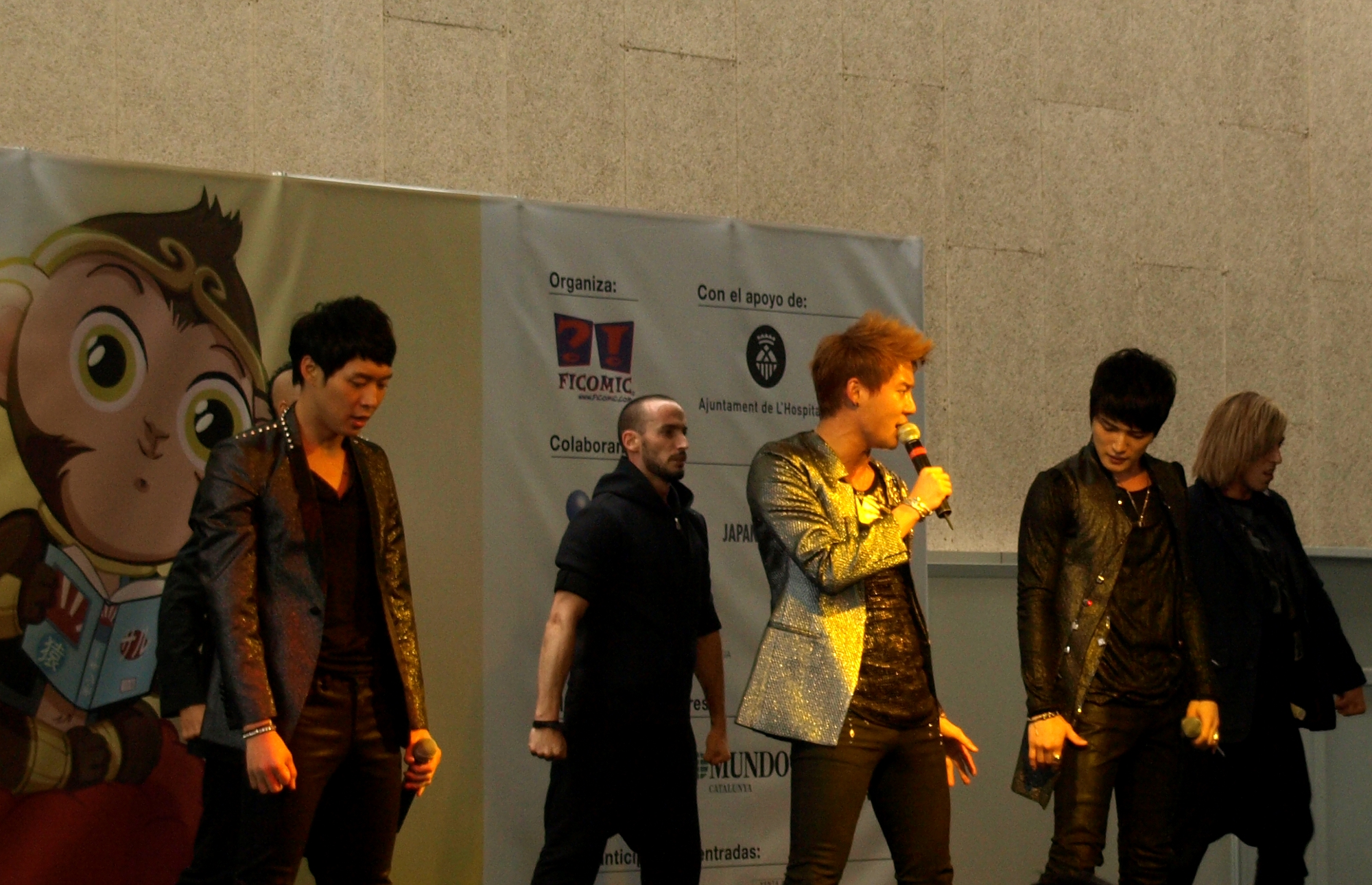
JYJ in Barcelona in 2011

JYJ released their Korean EP, Their Rooms "Our Story" on January 25, 2011, in the format of a "music essay." Despite the majority of sales being counted in the books rather than CD category, the album sold well enough to chart on Hanteo.

In the spring of 2011, JYJ launched their first worldwide tour as a group with concerts held in Thailand, Taiwan, China, Canada, and the United States. In addition, JYJ held two rounds of a special charity concert in Tokyo to benefit those affected by the Tōhoku earthquake. They also held two special concert performances in South Korea.

In September, JYJ released their first Korean studio album entitled In Heaven. There were over 300,000 pre-orders on the first day of advance sales alone. The album sold 165,000 copies within 3 days of being released and reached 220,000 copies sales in October according to Gaon Chart.

JYJ held their "Unforgettable Live Concert in Japan" on October 15 and 16 with over 84,000 in attendance. They were praised for the choice to hold these concerts in Ibaraki Prefecture, a region hit hard economically by the earthquake.

JYJ extended their world tour by adding performance dates in Barcelona, Spain on October 29 and in Berlin, Germany on November 6. Rafa Mendez directed the choreography and stage set-up of their European concerts. Also, JYJ was invited to appear at the Salon Del Manga convention earlier on the day before the start their Barcelona concert.

JYJ released Come On Over, a DVD documentary about the 3 members' private lives, at the end of 2011. The footage was filmed from late December 2010 to February 2011, following each individual member's lives for a number of days. Some scenes included: a birthday party, a snowboarding venture, the rehearsal for a musical, and behind-the-scenes look of one of JYJ's fanmeets for their endorsements.

=== 2012–14: Breakthrough success ===
In January 2012, C-JeS announced two more concert dates to be held in Santiago, Chile on March 9 and in Lima, Peru on March 11. Their South American leg would be the final stops for JYJ's first worldwide Tour.

On February 23, 2012, JYJ released a 90-minute film titled The Day in South Korea. It was a documentary film featuring their daily lives and dreams, and was screened for 4 days at Lotte Cinema's 17 major chain theatres across the country, drawing 24,000 fans.

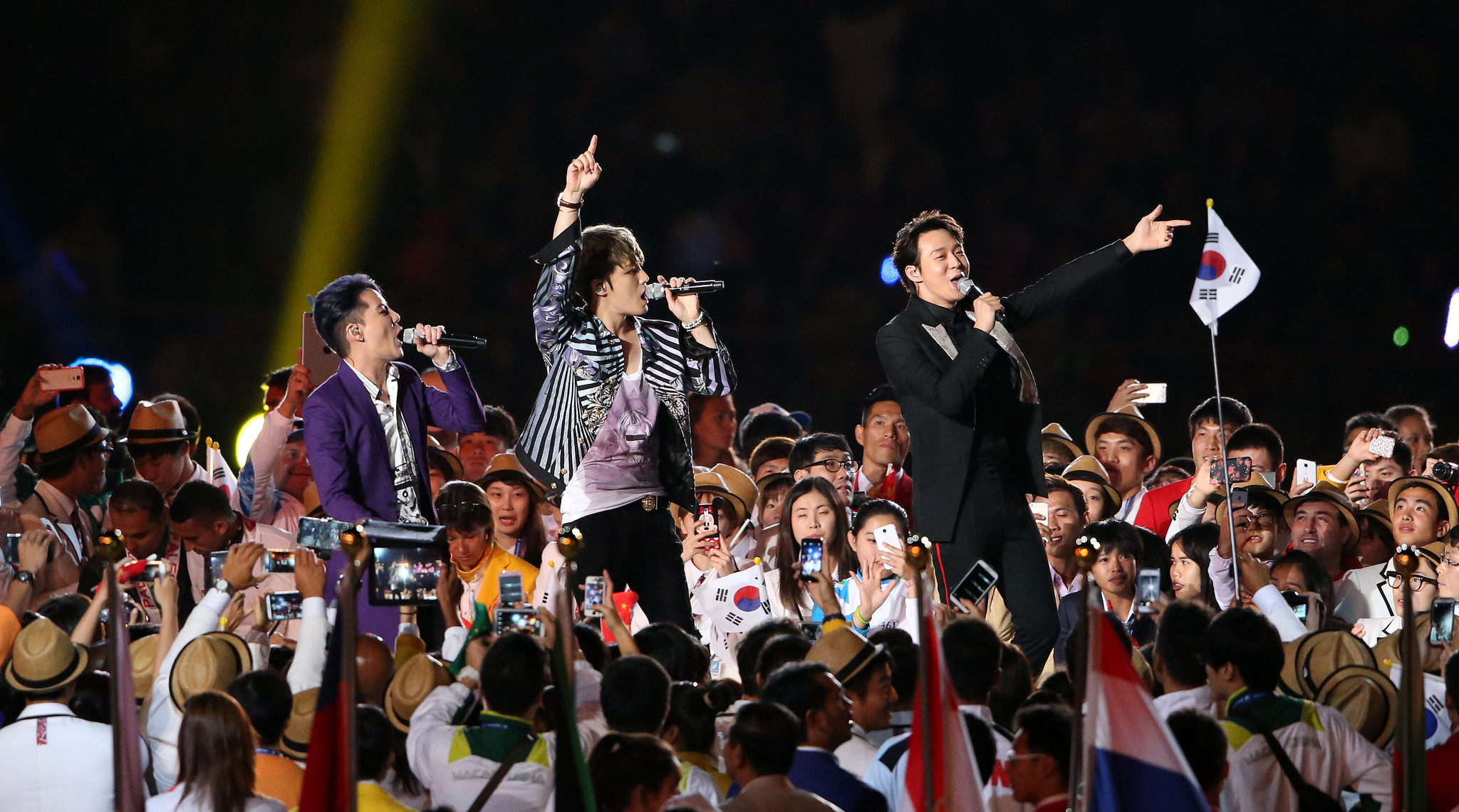
JYJ in 2014 Asian Games opening ceremony

In June 2012, JYJ held the first ever large-scale international fan fair in South Korea. The "2012 JYJ Membership Week" was put together specifically as a gift for their fans, and fully funded by the members themselves in spite of numerous sponsorship offers. It was held for 4 days— from June 28 to July 1—at SETEC (Seoul Trade Exhibition & Conventions) at Hak Yeo Ul station and cost an estimated KRW 3.7 billion. The membership week included photographic and video-based exhibitions of the group, theatre screenings of The Day as well as two sets of fan meetings that invited over 15,000 Korean fans and 7,000 Japanese fans. The huge influx of foreigners was the largest for a single event, and generated great economic benefits for South Korea. JYJ's representative C-JeS Entertainment has announced that this Membership Week event will be held annually.

In August 2012, JYJ released Mahalo, a premiere collection photobook with over 200 pages taken during their trip to Hawaii in December 2011.

On February 25, 2013, JYJ performed a medley of hit songs from the '90s as well as their own songs at the 18th South Korean Presidential Inauguration Ceremony for the country's first female president Park Geun-hye, in front of an audience of 70,000 people. At the same time C-JeS Entertainment announced that the band would be able to perform at Tokyo Dome in Japan after a four-year hiatus due to their lawsuit with Avex Group. The band held a 3-day concert series titled "The Return of the JYJ" from April 2 to 4. As all 150,000 tickets were sold out, footage was released to 118 theatres across Japan in order to accommodate fans unable to obtain tickets for the concerts.

In July 2014 the band released their first studio album in three years, Just Us. The band reached the music charts with the song, "Back Seat".

=== 2018–2024: Return from military and departures from C-JeS Entertainment ===
On November 5, 2018, Kim Junsu returned from the military, thus completing JYJ's military services.

On April 23, 2019, C-JeS Entertainment ended Yoochun's contract with the company after reports that he had tested positive for drugs, and they announced that he would retire from the industry. Yoochun has since continued his solo activities under the label Re:Cielo. He released his comeback solo album titled Re:Mind, on November 19, 2020.

On November 9, 2021, C-JeS Entertainment officially announced that Junsu had left the agency after 12 years following the expiration of his contract. It was never clarified as to whether he was still a member of the group or not.

On March 30, 2022, it was announced that Jaejoong and Junsu would be collaborating to release the song "Sixth Magnitude Star" for a Japanese drama. Despite being the only members of the group, they were not credited as JYJ. That same year, the group's profile was removed from C-JeS's website, confirming they are no longer active under the label. On April 18, 2023, Jaejoong became the last member to leave C-JeS to pursue a producing career.

== Lawsuits against S.M. Entertainment and Avex ==
In mid-2009, Jaejoong, Yoochun and Junsu (then-members of group TVXQ) filed a lawsuit against SM Entertainment, arguing that the 13-year length and structure of their exclusive contracts as well as the terms of profit distribution were unilaterally and unfairly disadvantageous towards the artists and should be invalidated. The Seoul Central District Court in October 2009 ruled in their favor affirming their right to independently engage in entertainment activities and granted them injunction suspending the SM contracts; its ruling emphatically pointed out it was a "subjugating contract" with terms that are grossly incompatible with Korean labor and contract law. The three members of JYJ continued their activities in Japan for over half a year after the filing of the injunction until their Japanese agency, Avex, unilaterally suspended their activities in 2010 and gave its support to the remaining two members of the original group. JYJ then filed an injunction to terminate their exclusive contract with Avex.

On February 17, 2011, the Seoul Central District Court dismissed SM Entertainment's injunction against the three members, filed in April 2010 for damage compensation. In September 2012, the final decision on the case was postponed indefinitely by Seoul Central District Court for mediation under the justice department.

On November 28, 2012, during a voluntary arbitration at the Seoul Central District Court, SM Entertainment and JYJ reached a mutual agreement to terminate all contracts between the two parties and not to interfere with each other's activities in the future. This concluded the three years and four months long exclusive contract lawsuit in Korea.

On January 18, 2013, Tokyo District Court ruled against Avex in their claims of an exclusive contract in the management of JYJ in Japan and ordered Avex to pay 660 million yen as damages to JYJ’s Korean management company C-JeS Entertainment and 1 million yen as damages to the representative of C-JeS for defamation charges. Avex has filed for an appeal.

On February 16, 2014, C-JeS Entertainment and AVEX's long legal battle has been resolved. C-JeS Entertainment wrote on their official homepage, "C-JeS (JYJ) and AVEX has agreed to end all the legal battles we have had. C-JeS (JYJ) and AVEX will no longer meddle in each other's affairs."

== Philanthropy ==
JYJ commemorated their inaugural group tour, The Beginning Showcase World Tour 2010, by donating the profits (about 44,000,000 KRW) from the Seoul showcase to World Vision International. Immediately after the 2011 Tōhoku earthquake and tsunami, JYJ donated ₩600,000,000 to World Vision Japan fulfilling the organization's entire fundraising goal. JYJ also held two rounds of charity concerts at the Tokyo Yoyogi National Competition Arena in Tokyo on June 7, 2011, for a total of 20,000 fans. The proceeds were used to purchase 'radiation monitors' for schools in Fukushima. In addition, JYJ held charity concerts for 80,000 fans on October 15 and 16, 2011 at the Hitachi Kaihin Park in Ibaraki, a region badly damaged by the natural disasters. Profits from ticket sales were donated to the Ibaraki relief fund.

After the 2011 Thailand floods, JYJ donated ₩200,000,000 in November 2011 to World Vision, matching and doubling the organization's fundraising goal for flood relief in Thailand, for the purpose of dispensing emergency food aid, water treatment, mosquito nets and other daily necessities.

=== Public service and international campaigns ===
==== 2010 ====
Along with Kim Yuna, Park Ji-sung, Park Tae-Hwan, and Edward Kwon, they were appointed to promote the 2010 G-20 Seoul summit. They also served as honorary ambassadors for the Korea Electric Power Corporation (KEPCO). JYJ was appointed as Goodwill Ambassadors for World OKTA (World Overseas Korean Trader's Association), the largest association of overseas-based Korean business leaders, with President Lee Myung Bak present at the ceremony.

==== 2011 ====
They were also the face of the "2011 Protecting Personal Identity Information Campaign" launched by Korea Communication Commission and the Korea Internet & Security Agency.

JYJ performed at the first annual Asian Dream Cup organized by ex-Manchester United midfielder Park Ji-sung's JS Foundation on June 15 at a stadium in Ho Chi Minh City, Vietnam. They used their widespread popularity in Asia to help publicize the charity soccer match, in which JYJ's Kim Junsu, a soccer enthusiast and captain of the South Korean entertainers soccer club "FC Men" also played in. JYJ later participated in the one-day soccer clinic with young Vietnamese athletes and 15 other star Korean and Japanese footballers. Proceeds from the charity match were donated to help sport development and support youth players in Vietnam as the JS foundation is seeking to expand its youth football development program and support cultural exchanges for football players around Asia.

In July 2011, JYJ fans broke the record for rice wreath donations, donating 6.56 tons of rice to feed underprivileged children in the name of Kim Jaejoong.

In August 2011, JYJ was appointed Goodwill Ambassadors for the United Nations agency UNAIDS.

In November 2011, they were selected as outreach ambassadors for the Korean Ministry of Education, Science, and Technology in their efforts at improving online youth culture and "creating schools without violence and [purposeful/bullying] exclusion".

In November and December 2011, JYJ spearheaded their "Mango Tree Project" by working with World Vision and ELLE Korea to gift "mango trees of hope to children" in South Sudan. JYJ, along with labelmates Park Yoohwan and Song Jihyo, recorded Korean, Japanese, and English videos discussing the project to raise awareness and to encourage donations with the goal of planting 20,000 mango trees ahead of Christmas in South Sudan. The mango trees symbolize hope and provide food and a sheltered meeting spot which can serve as classrooms for children.

==== 2012 ====
In February 2012, JYJ was appointed as honorary ambassadors for the 2012 Nuclear Security Summit to be held in Seoul on March 26 and 27.

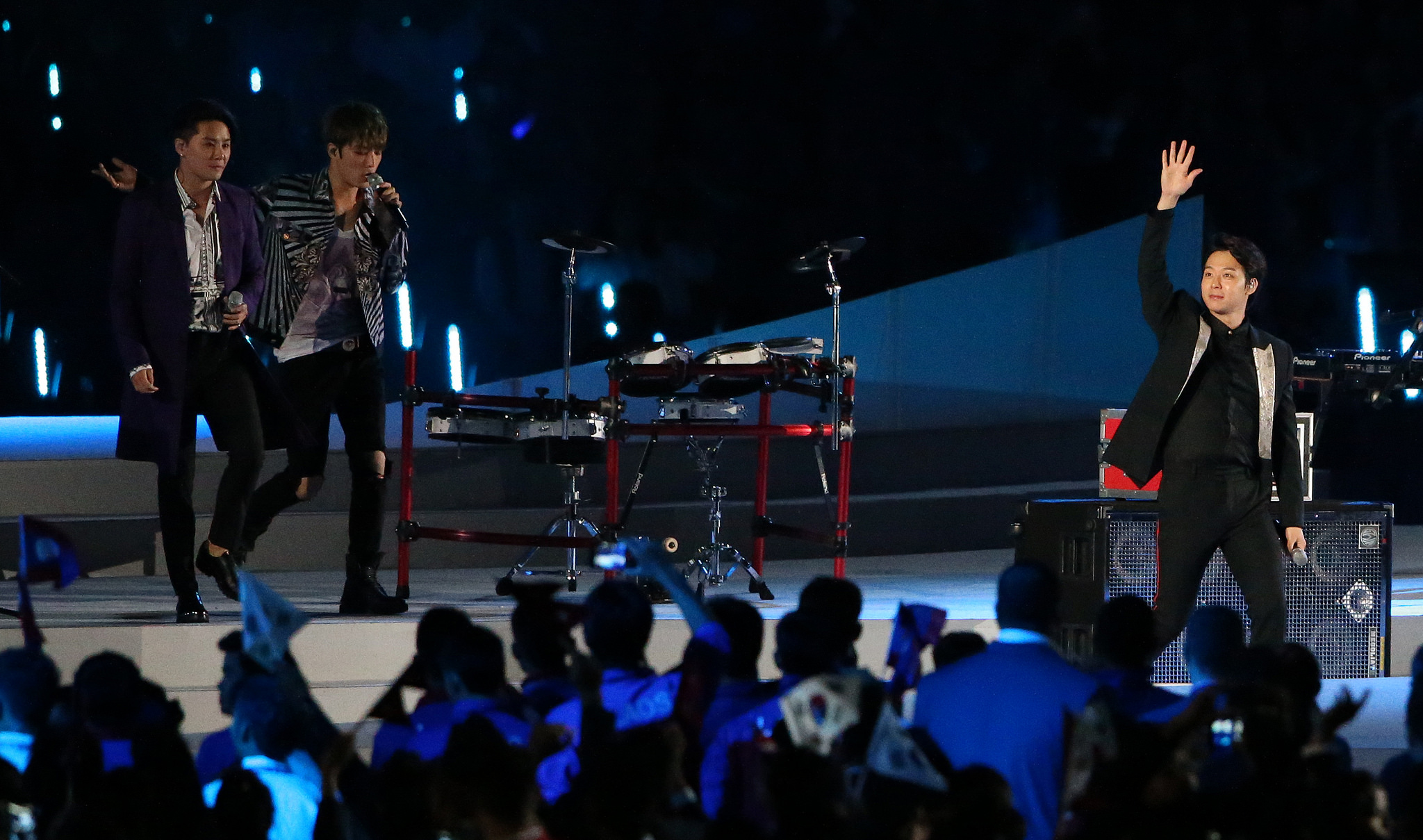
2014 Asian Games opening ceremony, JYJ performing, "Only One". Left to right: Junsu, Jaejoong, Yoochun.

==== 2013–2015 ====
On February 20, 2013, JYJ was appointed as honorary ambassadors to help raise awareness for the 2014 Asian Games. The group participated in producing a music video for the Asian Games and took on international promotional activities in October and November. On September 3, 2013, teaser of the official MV of 2014 Incheon Asian song 'Only One' by JYJ was released on YouTube. JYJ was scheduled to visit Vietnam, Guangzhou, and the Philippines in the end of 2013 to promote the 2014 Asian Games.

JYJ were appointed honorary ambassadors for the 7th World Water Forum held in South Korea in April 2015.

== Discography ==
English albums

- The Beginning (2010)

Korean albums

- In Heaven (2011)
- Just Us (2014)

== Photobooks and magazines ==
- 2011: 3hree Voices II. Photo Story --- Photobook with bonus DVD including highlights and undisclosed footage of 3hree Voices II
- 2012: JYJ Premiere Collection "Mahalo" --- Photobook with bonus DVD
- 2012: "The JYJ" Vol. 1 - The Story of 1000 Days --- Magazine with bonus DVD containing pictorials and interviews regarding their 1000 days together as JYJ spanning from 2009 to 2012
- 2013: "The JYJ" Vol. 2 - The Return of the JYJ --- Magazine with bonus DVD containing pictorials and interviews regarding JYJ's thoughts and experiences with friendship

== Tours and concerts ==
- "Jaejung/Yuchun/Junsu A-nation concerts in OSAKA 2010"
- "Jaejung/Yuchun/Junsu Thanksgiving concerts in Tokyo Dome 2010"
- "JYJ Showcase Tour 2010"
- "JYJ World Tour Concert 2011"
- "JYJ World Tour Concert 2012"
- "The Return of JYJ Tokyo Dome 2013"
- "The Return of The King Asia tour 2014"
- "JYJ Ichigo Ichie Japan Dome Tour 2014"

== Awards ==
Name of the award ceremony, year presented, category, nominee of the award, and the result of the nomination
Award ceremony	Year	Category	Nominee / work	Result	Ref.
Channel [V] Thailand Music Video Awards	2011	Popular Asian Artist	The Beginning	Won	
KBS Best Icon Award |	2011	Top Idol Star	In Heaven	Won	
Korean Cultural Entertainment Awards	2012	Grand Prize (Daesang)	JYJ	Won	
Korean Cultural Entertainment Awards	2014	Grand Prize (Daesang)	JYJ	Won	
Korean Popular Culture and Arts Awards	2015	Prime Minister's Commendation	JYJ	Won	

=== Listicles ===
Name of publisher, year listed, name of listicle, and placement
Publisher	Year	Listicle	Placement	Ref.
Forbes	2012	Korea Power Celebrity	13th	
Forbes	2013	Korea Power Celebrity	25th	
