= Xia discography =

XIA discography
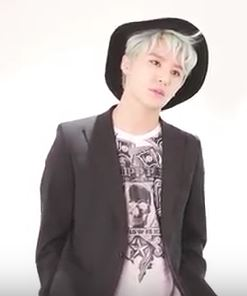
- Studio albums: 5
- EPs: 5
- Singles: 18
- Video albums: 3
- Music videos: 13
- Collaborations: 4
- Soundtrack appearances: 18

South Korean singer Kim Junsu, also known by the stage name Xia, has released five studio albums, five EPs, one single album, eighteen singles, and eighteen soundtrack appearances.

He debuted in December 2003 as part of the boy group TVXQ prior to forming the trio JYJ in April 2010.

He embarked on his solo career in the same year with the EP Xiah, which was released to the Japanese market. In May 2012, he made his domestic debut with the studio album Tarantallegra, which topped the Gaon Album Chart with more than 120,000 copies sold, becoming the best-selling album by a solo artist since the establishment of the chart in 2010. His June 2026 release, Gravity, received career high first week sales.

== Albums ==
=== Studio albums ===
Title	Album details	Peak chart positions			Sales
Title	Album details	KOR: Incredible: Flower: Xignature: Gravity:	JPN	US World	Sales
Tarantallegra	Released: May 14, 2012; Label: C-JeS Entertainment; Formats: CD, digital download, streaming	1	8	10	KOR: 127,620; JPN: 27,000
Incredible	Released: July 15, 2013; Label: C-JeS Entertainment; Formats: CD, digital download, streaming	2	13	5	KOR: 90,787
Flower	Released: March 3, 2015; Label: C-JeS Entertainment; Formats: CD, digital download, streaming	2	9	7	KOR: 67,871
Xignature	Released: May 30, 2016; Label: C-JeS Entertainment; Formats: CD, digital download, streaming	1	7	14	KOR: 45,911; JPN: 10,842
Gravity	Released: June 2, 2026; Label: Palmtree Island; Formats: CD, digital download, streaming	11	—	—	KOR: 59,458
"—" denotes releases that did not chart or were not released in that region.

=== Single albums ===
Title	Album details	Peak chart positions	Sales
Title	Album details	KOR	Sales
Uncommitted	Released: August 27, 2012; Label: C-JeS Entertainment; Formats: CD, digital download	1	KOR: 60,000

== Extended plays ==
Title	EP details	Peak chart positions			Sales
Title	EP details	KOR	JPN	US World	Sales
Xiah	Released: May 26, 2010; Label: Rhythm Zone; Formats: CD+DVD, digital download	—	2	—	JPN: 195,000
Musical December 2013 with Kim Junsu	Released: December 18, 2013; Label: C-JeS Entertainment; Formats: CD, digital download, streaming	1	28	—	KOR: 22,362
Flower (Special Edition)	Released May 28, 2015; Label: C-JeS Entertainment; Formats: CD, digital download, streaming	—	—	—	KOR: 11,286
Yesterday (꼭 어제)	Released: October 19, 2015; Label: C-JeS Entertainment; Formats: CD, digital download, streaming	1	11	9	KOR: 58,870; JPN: 12,735
Pit a Pat	Released: November 10, 2020; Label: C-JeS Entertainment; Formats: CD, digital download, streaming	7	25	—	KOR: 39,624
Dimension	Released: March 16, 2022; Label: Palm Tree Island; Formats: CD, digital download, streaming	9	49	—	KOR: 65,364; JPN: 1,451
"—" denotes releases that did not chart or were not released in that region.

== Singles ==
=== As a lead artist ===
Title	Year	Peak chart positions					Sales	Album
Title	Year	KOR	KOR Hot	JPN	JPN Hot	US World	Sales	Album
"Intoxication"	2010	—	—	2	4	—	JPN: 225,638	Xiah
"I Don't Like Love" (사랑이 싫다구요)	2012	18	15	—	—	—	KOR: 460,307	Tarantallegra
"Tarantallegra" (featuring Flowsik)	2012	22	39	—	—	13	KOR: 195,293	Tarantallegra
"Uncommitted"	2012	38	—	—	—	—		Uncommitted
"Thank U For"	2012	9	24	—	—	—		Non-album single
"11am" (11시 그 적당함)	2013	16	27	—	—	22	KOR: 169,368	Incredible
"Incredible" (featuring Quincy)	2013	14	27	—	—	10	KOR: 231,609	Incredible
"Serendipity" (스치다) (with Lyn)	2013	41	—	—	—	—		Musical December 2013 with Kim Junsu
"Flower" (featuring Tablo)	2015	4	—N/a	—	—	4	KOR: 172,154	Flower
"Just Yesterday" (꼭 어제)	2015	12	—N/a	—	—	—	KOR: 268,203	Yesterday
"..Is You"	2016	19	—N/a	—	—	—	KOR: 105,632	Xignature
"Rock the World" (featuring The Quiett & Automatic)	2016	52	—N/a	—	—	—	KOR: 138,370	Xignature
"Cake Love" (produced by The Black Skirts)	2016	89	—N/a	—	—	—		Non-album singles
"We Were" (우리도 그들처럼) (with Im Chang-jung)	2017	65	—N/a	—	—	—		Non-album singles
"Love No More" (사랑하고 싶지 않아)	2020	46	—N/a	—	—	—		Non-album singles
"Pit a Pat"	2020	—	—N/a	—	—	—		Pit a Pat
"Hana"	2022	—	—N/a	—	—	—		Dimension
"Red Diamond"	2023	—	—N/a	—	—	—		Non-album singles
"Our Season" (스물한 번째 계절이 널 기다릴 테니까)	2024	177	—N/a	—	—	—		Non-album singles
"Gravity"	2026	— (Note: "Gravity" did not enter the Circle Digital Chart, but peaked at number 11 on the Circle Download Chart.)	—N/a	—	—	—		Gravity
"—" denotes releases that did not chart or were not released in that region.

=== As featured artist ===
Title	Year	Peak chart positions	Sales	Album
Title	Year	KOR	Sales	Album
"Timeless" (Zhang Liyin featuring Xia)	2006	—	KOR: 14,231 (physical)	I Will
"Dream" (Psy featuring Xia)	2015	—		칠집싸이다
"Ain't Nobody Like You" (또 있을까 싶어) (Crucial Star featuring Xia)	2016	92	KOR: 49,770	Fall 2
"My Christmas Wish" (내 크리스마스 소원) (Palm Tree Island Artists featuring Xia)	2023	—		My Christmas Wish
"—" denotes releases that did not chart or were not released in that region.

=== Soundtrack appearances ===
Title	Year	Peak chart positions		Sales	Album
Title	Year	KOR	US World	Sales	Album
"Too Love"	2010	28	—		Sungkyunkwan Scandal OST
"You Are So Beautiful"	2011	3	—		Scent of a Woman OST
"Love Is Like a Snowflake" (사랑은 눈꽃처럼)	2012	8	—	KOR: 1,174,209	The Innocent Man OST
"Foolish Heart" (바보 가슴)	2013	45	—		The Fugitive of Joseon OST
"Love You" (사랑합니다)	2013	19	—		Empress Ki OST
"The Time I Loved You" (널 사랑한 시간에)	2014	39	—		Mr. Back OST
"The Time Is You" (너라는 시간이 흐른다)	2015	19	—		Six Flying Dragons OST
"How Can I Love You"	2016	1	12	KOR: 1,556,884	Descendants of the Sun OST
"Lean On Me" (내게 기대)	2016	46	—		Lucky Romance OST
"Way" (길)	2016	91	—		Night Light OST
"Blows" (흩날린다)	2019	—	—		Nokdu Flower OST
"Goodbye"	2021	—	—		Penthouse 3 OST
"Still Forever" (애절 보이스)	2021	—	—		Jinx OST
"I'm Still" (네가 불어오는 이곳에서 난 여전히)	2021	147	—		The Red Sleeve OST
"The Memory of Wind" (기억을 실어 온 바람)	2022	—	—		Jinxed at First OST
"When We Were Young" (때 그 시절)	2022	—	—		Webtoon: Good Doctor OST
"Childhood Dreams" (어린날의 꿈처럼)	2022	—	—		Behind Every Star OST
"All of Us" (우리의 모든)	2023	—	—		Moon Rising During the Day OST
"—" denotes releases that did not chart or were not released in that region.

== Other charted songs ==
Title	Year	Peak chart positions	Sales	Album
Title	Year	KOR	Sales	Album
"Lullaby" (Feat. 개코 of Dynamic Duo)	2012	45	KOR: 56,360	Tarantallegra
"Around and Around" (돌고 돌아도)	2012	50	KOR: 53,501	Tarantallegra
"No Gain"	2012	54	KOR: 52,326	Tarantallegra
"Even Though I Already Know" (알면서도)	2012	61	KOR: 50,252	Tarantallegra
"The Tree Covered In Dew" (이슬을 머금은 나무)	2012	67	KOR: 45,117	Tarantallegra
"Set Me Free" (Feat. Bizzy)	2012	69	KOR: 45,197	Tarantallegra
"Breath" (Feat. Double K)	2012	78	KOR: 41,547	Tarantallegra
"Fever"	2012	81	KOR: 39,417	Tarantallegra
"Intoxication"	2012	83	KOR: 40,131	Tarantallegra
"Sorry" (미안)	2013	25	KOR: 73,858	Incredible
"I'm Confessing Now" (나 지금 고백한다)	2013	48	KOR: 47,724	Incredible
"Don't Go" (가지마)	2013	57	KOR: 89,450	Incredible
"Seems Like Love" (사랑하나 봐)	2013	64	KOR: 35,297	Incredible
"Chocolate Girl"	2013	67	KOR: 33,488	Incredible
"Rainy Eyes"	2013	69	KOR: 33,217	Incredible
"This Song Is Funny, Right?" (이 노래 웃기지 (Narr. 붐))	2013	70	KOR: 33,006	Incredible
"No Reason"	2013	73	KOR: 31,001	Incredible
"Fantasy"	2013	75	KOR: 30,359	Incredible
"Turn It Up" (Feat. Dok2)	2013	81	KOR: 29,001	Incredible
"Butterfly" (나비)	2015	39	KOR: 38,584	Flower
"X Song" (Feat. Dok2)	2015	53	KOR: 29,257	Flower
"Breath of Love" (사랑숨)	2015	57	KOR: 26,773	Flower
"Reach"	2015	59	KOR: 25,491	Flower
"My Night" (나의 밤)	2015	61	KOR: 25,915	Flower
"Hateful Words" (그 말 참 밉다)	2015	69	KOR: 25,388	Flower
"Out Of Control" (Feat. YDG)	2015	76	KOR: 22,144	Flower
"License to Love"	2015	78	KOR: 21,706	Flower
"Love You More"	2015	79	KOR: 22,003	Flower
"Hello Hello"	2015	83	KOR: 21,652	Flower
"Musical in Life"	2015	86	KOR: 20,873	Flower
"F.L.P"	2015	89	KOR: 20,252	Flower
"OeO" (feat. Giriboy)	2015	46	KOR: 38,935	Yesterday
"Midnight show" (Feat. Cheetah)	2015	47	KOR: 36,534	Yesterday
"The Rabbit and the Turtle" (토끼와 거북이)	2015	56	KOR: 30,815	Yesterday
"Silk Road" (비단길) (feat. BewhY)	2015	76	KOR: 25,182	Yesterday
"Flower" (꽃) (Acoustic Ver.)	2015	81	KOR: 24,250	Yesterday
"Incredible" (Acoustic Ver.)	2015	88	KOR: 21,467	Yesterday
"Tarantallegra" (Acoustic Ver.)	2015	97	KOR: 19,364	Yesterday
"Sweet Melody" (featuring Ben)	2016	49	KOR: 46,466	Xignature
"This Love Shouldn't Go Away" (이 사랑을 떠나가면 안돼요)	2016	92	KOR: 27,314	Xignature
"You're Irreplaceable" (다른 누구도 대신 못할 너)	2016	— (Note: "You're Irreplaceable" (다른 누구도 대신 못할 너) did not enter the Gaon Digital Chart, but peaked at number 85 on the Gaon Download Chart.)	KOR: 20,315	Xignature
"Don't Forget" (잊지는 마)	2016	— (Note: "Don't Forget" (잊지는 마) did not enter the Gaon Digital Chart, but peaked at number 87 on the Gaon Download Chart.)	KOR: 20,038	Xignature
"Fun Drive" ((FUN 드라이브) featuring Crucial Star)	2016	— (Note: "Fun Drive" (FUN 드라이브) did not enter the Gaon Digital Chart, but peaked at number 88 on the Gaon Download Chart.)	KOR: 19,885	Xignature
"Still" (여전히)	2016	— (Note: "Still" (여전히) did not enter the Gaon Digital Chart, but peaked at number 95 on the Gaon Download Chart.)	KOR: 18,467	Xignature

== Composing and songwriting ==
Year	Role	Song	Language	Album
2006	Composer	"네 곁에 숨쉴 수 있다면"	Korean	"O"-Jung.Ban.Hap.
2007	Composer	"My Page"	Korean	2nd Asia Tour Concert "O"
2007	Lyricist	"Daydream"	Korean	Anyband (single)
2008	Composer	"Rainy Night"	Japanese	"If.../Rainy Night" (single)
2008	Lyricist	"노을..바라보다"	Korean	Mirotic
2009	Composer; Lyricist	"Xiahtic" (feat. Key of Shinee)	Korean	3rd Asia Concert "Mirotic"
2010	Composer; Lyricist	"Xiahtic" (feat. Key of Shinee)	Japanese	"Break Out!" (single)
2010	Composer; Lyricist	"Intoxication"	Japanese	Xiah (solo single)
2010	Composer	"I Can Soar"	English	The Beginning
2011	Composer	"Mission"	Korean	Their Rooms "Our Story" (music essay)
2011	Composer; Lyricist	"Fallen Leaves"	Korean	Their Rooms "Our Story" (music essay)
2011	Lyricist	"You're"	Korean	In Heaven
2012	Composer; Arranger	"Sunset"	Korean	Tarantallegra
2012	Composer; Arranger	"Tarantallegra" (feat. Flowsik)	Korean	Tarantallegra
2012	Composer; Arranger	"돌고 돌아도"	Korean	Tarantallegra
2012	Composer; Lyricist	"Set Me Free" (feat. Bizzy)	Korean	Tarantallegra
2012	Composer; Lyricist	"Lullaby" (feat. 개코 Of Dynamic Duo)	Korean	Tarantallegra
2012	Composer; Lyricist	"이슬을 머금은 나무"	Korean	Tarantallegra
2012	Composer, Lyricist; Arranger	"Intoxication"	Korean	Tarantallegra
2012	Composer, Lyricist; Arranger	"Breath" (feat. Double K)	Korean	Tarantallegra
2012	Lyricist	"Fever"	Korean	Tarantallegra
2013	Composer	"Rainy Eyes"	Korean	Incredible
2013	Lyricist	"Incredible"	Korean	Incredible
2013	Lyricist	"Turn It Up" (feat. Dok2)	Korean	Incredible
2013	Composer; Lyricist	"나지금고백한다" (feat. Gilme)	Korean	Incredible
2013	Composer; Lyricist	"이노래웃기지"	Korean	Incredible
2014	Lyricist	Letting Go	Korean	JYJ: Just Us
2015	Lyricist	Reach	Korean	Flower
2015	Lyricist	Out of Control	Korean	Flower
2015	Lyricist	License to Love	Korean	Flower
2015	Lyricist	Musical in Life	Korean	Flower
2015	Lyricist	F.L.P	Korean	Flower
2015	Composer	Hello Hello	Korean	Flower
2015	Lyricist, Composer	꽃 (Flower)	Korean	Flower
2015	Lyricist, Composer	X Song	Korean	Flower
2026	Composer	Gravity	Korean	Gravity
2026	Composer	Homage	Korean	Gravity
2026	Composer	Like Like Like	Korean	Gravity
2026	Lyricist	Forest of Memories	Korean	Gravity
2026	Lyricist	What About Your Goodbye	Korean	Gravity
2026	Lyricist	Beat's Knockin	Korean	Gravity
2026	Lyricist	eXtreme Love	Korean	Gravity

== Videography ==
=== Music videos ===
Year	Song	Album	Notes
2010	"Intoxication"	Xiah (single)	
2012	"Tarantallegra"	Tarantallegra	Directed by Ray Yeom
2012	"Tarantallegra" (Dance Ver.)	Tarantallegra	Directed by Ray Yeom
2012	"Uncommitted"	Uncommitted (single)	Directed by Marc Klasfeld; Shot in Los Angeles
2012	"알면서도" (Even though I already know)	Tarantallegra	Showed for the first time at XIA 1st World Tour Concert's wrap-up show in Oberhausen, Germany
2013	"11시 그 적당함"(11AM)	Incredible	Sung lived and filmed in one take
2013	"Incredible"	Incredible	Feat. Quincy Brown; Shot in Beverly Hills.
2015	"Flower"	Flower	
2015	"꼭 어제"	Yesterday	
2015	"OeO"	Yesterday	
2016	"Rock the World"	Xignature	
2026	"Gravity"	Gravity	

=== DVDs ===
Release	Title	Details	Track listing
2011	Kim Junsu Musical Concert, Levay with Friends	Details: Released: 14 March 2011; No of Disc: 2; Language: Korean; Subtitles: English, Japanese; 80-pages photobook; Sales: 40,000+	Track listing DISC 01 :: THE MUSICAL CONCERT: Songs from Mozart! the musical which has the best local musical performers participating in it, such as "I Am Music, "Why Can’t You Love Me," "Golden Stars," "I Want To Escape My Fate" – 18 songs in total.; Elisabeth (Korean version) – 6 songs in total.; Sylvester Levay’s present to Kim Junsu, " Miss You So". (Levay performs on stage, accompanying Junsu on the piano); DISC 02 :: SPECIAL FEATURES: The encore performance of "Intoxication", which became a huge topic during the concert. This song was originally from Kim Junsu’s Japanese single, and was rearranged into an orchestra version.; Making film of the preparation process of the concert – Approximately 1 hour long.; Introduction of the practice room that moved the hearts of fans, as well as the make-up room, behind the scenes and after party footage.; Photo-slideshow
2012	XIA 1st Asia Tour Concert - Tarantallegra	Details: Released: 31 October 2012; No of Disc: 3; Language: Korean; Subtitles: English, Japanese, Chinese, Spanish; 108-page photobook	Track listing DISC 01 :: XIA’s Concert in Korea: Concert; 1. "Breath"; 2. "No Gain"; 3. "Lullaby"; 4. "Intoxication"; 5. "Set Me Free"; 6. "You Are So Beautiful"; 7. "알면서도 (Even Though You Already Know)"; 8. "돌고 돌아도 (Turn Around And Around)"; 9. "The Last Dance"; 10. "I am, I am Music"; 11. "Why Don't You Love Me"; 12. "Tarantallegra"; 13. "Fever"; 14. "Mission"; 15. "사랑이 싫다구요 (I Don't Like Love)"; 16. "이슬을 머금은 나무 (The Tree Covered The Dew)"; 17. "앵콜 낙엽 (Fallen Leaves)"; DISC 02 :: XIA’s Concert Sketch Movie: Korea / Thailand / Indonesia / Taiwan / China; DISC 03 :: XIA’s Concert Story: 1st Solo Concert / Favorite Song / Musical & Music Video / Xia’s Image / To The Fans
2013	2012 XIA Ballad & Musical Concert with Orchestra	Details: Released: 30 November 2013; No of Disc: 3; Language: Korean; Subtitles: English, Japanese, Chinese; 100-page photobook	Track listing DISC 01 :: Ballad & Musical Concert with Orchestra part 1: 1. "Opening part 1"; 2. "나는 나는 음악 (I am, I am Music)"; 3. "내 운명 피하고 싶어"; 4. "호랑이와 비둘기"; 5. "이렇게 사랑해 본 적 없죠"; 6. "들리나요"; 7. "마지막 춤 (The Last Dance)"; 8. "지금 이 순간"; 9. "사랑이 싫다고요 (I Don't Like Love)"; 10. "Lullaby"; 11. "You are so Beautiful"; DISC 02 :: Ballad & Musical Concert with Orchestra part 2: 1. "Opening part 2"; 2. "I Believe"; 3. "그런과 봐요"; 4. "정말"; 5. "내 여자라니까 (Because You're My Girl)"; 6. "Thank U For"; 7. "알면서도 (Even Though You Already Know)"; 8. "사랑은 눈꽃처럼 (Love is Like a Snowflake)"; 9. "Uncommitted"; 10. "Tarantallegra"; 11. "Finale"; 12. "Ending Credit"; DISC 03 :: Special Features: Opening / D-Day / Rehearsal / Behind The Scenes
