= Flower (Xia album) =

Studio album by XIA
- Released: March 3, 2015
- Recorded: 2015
- Genres: Pop; dance; k-ballad
- Language: Korean
- Labels: C-JeS, LOEN; L200001085 (Standard Edition); L100005024 (Special Edition)
- Producers: XIA; Park Il

XIA chronology
Musical December 2013 with Kim Junsu (2013)	Flower (2015)	Yesterday (2015)

Singles from Flower
- 1. "Flower" Released: March 3, 2015; 2. "X Song (Disco Funk Mix)" Released: May 28, 2015

Flower is the third studio album of South Korean singer Kim Junsu, released under his stage name XIA on March 3, 2015. The album features artists Tablo, Dok2 and Naul from Brown Eyed Soul. The album debuted at first place on the Gaon Chart.

XIA has revealed plans to release a special edition album on May 28. The special edition album will include a disco punk mix version of "X Song," an instrumental of "Flower," music videos, album jacket filming making video, a DVD including his interviews, and more than fifty previously unreleased photos.

== Track listing ==
No.	Title	Lyrics	Music	Length
1.	"Reach"	XIA	Alex von Soos
2.	"나비 Nabi" (Butterfly)	JUNO, J.Kimb	2JAJA, Hoi Jang-nim
3.	"꽃 Kkot" (Flower)	XIA, Kim Tae-won, Tablo	XIA
4.	"나의 밤 Na-ui bam" (My Night)	Naul	Naul
5.	"Out of Control"	XIA, YDG	Fraktal
6.	"X Song"	XIA	XIA, Kwon Bin-gi
7.	"License to Love"	XIA, Lisa Desmond, Christian Fast, Henrik Goransson	Lisa Desmond, Christian Fast, Henrik Goransson
8.	"Musical in Life"	XIA	Hoi Jang-nim, Jeong Jae-yeop
9.	"Love You More"	JUNO, J.Kimb	Ben Earle
10.	"F.L.P"	XIA, Bruce Vanderveer, Ebony Cunningham	Bruce Vanderveer, Ebony Cunningham
11.	"Hello Hello"	JUNO, J.Kimb	XIA, Park Il
12.	"그 말 참 밉다 Geu mal cham mibda" (Hateful Words)	Seong Hyeon, Baek Mu-hyeon	Seong Hyeon, Baek Mu-hyeon
13.	"사랑숨 Sarangsum" (Breath of Love)	Kim Ji-hyang	Melodesign

Flower (Special Edition)
No.	Title	Lyrics	Music	Length
1.	"X Song (Disco Funk Mix)"	XIA	XIA, Kwon Bin-gi	3:09
2.	"Reach"	XIA	Alex von Soos	4:19
3.	"나비 Nabi" (Butterfly)	JUNO, J.Kimb	2JAJA, Hoi Jang-nim	4:00
4.	"꽃 Kkot" (Flower)	XIA, Kim Tae-won, Tablo	XIA, Kim Tae-won	3:34
5.	"나의 밤 Na-ui bam" (My Night)	Naul	Naul	4:39
6.	"Out of Control"	XIA, YDG	Fraktal	3:28
7.	"X Song"	XIA	XIA, Kwon Bin-gi	3:00
8.	"License to Love"	XIA, Lisa Desmond, Christian Fast, Henrik Goransson	Lisa Desmond, Christian Fast, Henrik Goransson	3:34
9.	"Musical in Life"	XIA	Hoi Jang-nim, Jeong Jae-yeop	3:32
10.	"Love You More"	JUNO, J.Kimb	Ben Earle	3:17
11.	"F.L.P"	XIA, Bruce Vanderveer, Ebony Cunningham	Bruce Vanderveer, Ebony Cunningham	3:39
12.	"Hello Hello"	JUNO, J.Kimb	XIA, Park Il	4:05
13.	"그 말 참 밉다 Geu mal cham mibda" (Hateful Words)	Seong Hyeon, Baek Mu-hyeon	Seong Hyeon, Baek Mu-hyeon	4:27
14.	"사랑숨 Sarangsum" (Breath of Love)	Kim Ji-hyang	Melodesign	3:49
15.	"꽃(Inst.)" (Flower)		XIA, Kwon Bin-gi	3:34
