= Yesterday (Xia EP) =

EP by Xia
- Released: October 19, 2015
- Recorded: 2015
- Genre: Pop; dance; Urban R&B
- Language: Korean
- Label: C-JeS; LOEN

Xia chronology
Flower (2015)	Yesterday (2015)	Xignature (2016)

Singles from Yesterday
- 1. "Yesterday" Released: October 19, 2015

Yesterday (Korean: 꼭 어제; RR: Kkok Eoje) is the second EP released by South Korean singer Kim Junsu, under his stage name XIA on October 19, 2015. The first music video was released for the title song of the same name. The EP contains eight tracks, three of which are acoustic versions of previously released songs.

== Track list ==
No.	Title	Lyrics	Music	Length
1.	"Yesterday" (꼭 어제 (Kkok eoje))	Lucia	Lucia	04:35
2.	"OeO (Feat. Giriboy)"	Xia, J.Kimb, Giriboy	Xia, Jeong Jae-yeop	04:13
3.	"Midnight Show (Feat. Cheetah)"	Xia, Park Il	Xia, Park Il	03:20
4.	"The Rabbit and the Turtle" (토끼와 거북이 (Tokkiwa geobugi))	Hoe Jang-nim	Hoe Jang-nim	04:32
5.	"Silk Road (Feat. BewhY)" (비단길 (Bidangil))	Xia, Kwon Bin-gi	Xia, Kwon Bin-gi	03:08
6.	"Tarantallegra" (acoustic version)	Juno	Xia	03:28
7.	"Incredible" (acoustic version)	Xia, Bruce 'Automatic' Vanderveer, Ebony Cunningham	Bruce 'Automatic' Vanderveer, Ebony Cunningham	04:21
8.	"Flower" (꽃 (Kkot) acoustic version)	Xia, Kim Tae-wan	Xia, Kim Tae-wan	04:05

== Charts ==
Chart (2015)	Peak position
Gaon Album Chart	1
