= Bruce Vanderveer =

American record producer

Bruce Automatic Vanderveer
- Born: November 21; Brooklyn, New York, U.S.
- Other name: Automatic
- Occupations: Music producer, record label owner, audio engineer, Sony/ATV Music Publishing producer

Bruce Vanderveer, professionally known as Automatic, is a Grammy-nominated American record producer, songwriter, and entrepreneur. He is currently signed to Sony/ATV Music Publishing and is the CEO/co-founder of the entertainment company InRage Entertainment.

On his first production job, Automatic worked directly with Michael Jackson. Automatic has worked with artists such as Pink, Pussycat Dolls, Nicole Scherzinger, Christina Aguilera, Cher, Fabolous, James Brown and Raven Simone. In 2009, Automatic produced the #2 song on the Billboard Hot Singles Sales Chart, Cradle to the Grave, recorded by American Idol's Bettina Bush. His latest K-Pop record, "Rock The World", was recorded by K-Pop sensation JYJ's Kim Junsu (Xia). Featuring The Quiett and Automatic himself, the record was released on May 30, 2016 as the lead single from Xia's fourth studio album, Xignature, which peaked at number 14 on Billboard's World Albums chart. The Grammy-nominated producer also co-wrote the song "I'm Gonna Be a Star" alongside Ebony Rae Vanderveer, Park Jinyoung and Olltii. The South Korean girl group Twice recorded the song which served as the theme song for the 2015 reality girl group survival show Sixteen. Automatic also produced Xia's 2012 hit single "Uncommitted" which peaked at number 1 on South Korea's Gaon albums chart and number 19 on Billboard's Korea K-Pop Hot 100 chart.

== Early life ==
Automatic was born in Bushwick, Brooklyn, New York; raised in Flatbush and Red Hook, Brooklyn to a 16-year-old mother and raised by one of the most infamous drug dealers of New York City. He never met his biological father. Of Black-American and Japanese descent, Automatic was taught in the traditions of Buddhism from a young age. While many of his peers were involved in illegal activities, Automatic's attraction to music kept him from the dangers of the rough city streets of his neighborhood. His first encounter with a guitar lent to his name, Automatic. There was a little boy who lived next door to Automatic that played the guitar every day. Automatic asked the little boy to play guitar every day, but the little boy would not share. One day, after being so frustrated that his neighbor would not share, he shoved the little boy down and took his guitar from him. The little boy ran upstairs to tell his mother and Automatic started plucking the old, 4-stringed guitar. He intuitively began to play a melody on the guitar. Having no prior instrumental or musical lessons, his mother was stunned that her son was playing a tune on the spot. Thus, she nicknamed him, "Automatic".

From that day on, Automatic showed he had a natural ability to learn how to play instruments. In junior high, he joined the concert band at Roy H. Mann Junior High School in Brooklyn. He chose to play the trombone. Each week he would ask his classmates if he could borrow their instruments to take home so that he could learn how to play them. He eventually taught himself how to play 13 instruments. Automatic also used his nickname as his stage name when he would rap and dance. Growing up in hip-hop, he was part of the early, crucial moments in hip-hop that would later define and popularize the genre. Automatic befriended and battled with who would become hip-hop icons Notorious B.I.G., LL Cool J, Nice and Smooth and Big Daddy Kane. Automatic's popularity as a hip-hop artist grew. When he was 13 years old, he was invited to participate in a PBS special on hip-hop where he break danced. His appearance in the special led to him appearing as a dancer in Krush Groove, starring Run DMC, LL Cool J and Sheila E. He also danced in Beat Street.

In addition to music and dancing, Automatic focused on martial arts with his sensei who taught him Yip Man's Wing Chun kung-fu. He began practicing Bruce Lee's style of Jeet Kune Do. He competed in and won multiple underground fights as a teenager and became well-respected in the martial arts community.

== Crisis leads to record deal ==
When he was 15 years old, Automatic left home to escape the abuse and negative lifestyle of his step-father. As a result of leaving home, he became homeless, living on the streets of Brooklyn for four months. He was on track to be the valedictorian of South Shore High School and was the most popular kid in high school, but all of this turmoil in his life caused him to drop out of school. He worked at the Palladium, Mels Diner and a microfilm company for money until he could afford his own apartment. He convinced a landlord in Sunset Park, Brooklyn to rent an apartment to him at the age of 16. Automatic formed a band, Auto and Cherokee. The band played CBGB's, the Cat Club, the Palladium and other clubs in the Village and Manhattan. The band soon caught the eye of J.J. French, bass player of the rock band, Twisted Sister. French signed on to manage the group. The band moved together to Red Hook, Brooklyn and shared a factory-style loft. They auditioned for multiple record companies and were turned down many times. Grammy Award-winning producer, David Kershenbaum, heard about the group and came to Red Hook to hear the band who performed a showcase in their loft for him. He immediately signed them to Morgan Creek/Polygram Records. In 1993, the first professional release was Auto and Cherokee, "Naked Music", written, composed and produced by Automatic, Keith Cohen and Carmen Rizzo. The album was a fusion of hip-hop, R&B and Prince-infused vibes. The album featured Dave Coz and members of the group Fishbone. The single from the album "Taste" is featured in the movie The Crush starring Alicia Silverstone and in "Stay Tuned" starring John Ritter. While on Morgan Creek, Automatic was managed by Rob Kehane and Mark Schimmel.

== From producing and songwriting in the 1990s ==
In 1994–1995, Automatic began to develop musical groups under his production company Apple Children Productions. The first group that he put together was Forever Yours, later named Brownstone. He also discovered a young Australian boy on Venice Beach, Wade Robson, whom he taught hip hop and rap and developed vocally. He later became a member of the duo Quo. Both acts later became signed to Michael Jackson's record label, MJJ Records/Sony. Wade Robson went on to become a world-famous choreographer working with acts like ‘Nsync and Britney Spears. In 1994, he became the youngest producer to sign a double production deal with to A&M/Perspective records. He worked directly with legendary producers Jimmy Jam and Terry Lewis. They produced acts including four songs on Raja-Neé’s album Hot and Ready. He produced "How Long" by Sweet Sable for the Above the Rim soundtrack and produced a remix of James Brown's "How Long."

From 1995 to 1998, he worked for the WB Television Network producing songs for The Jamie Foxx Show, Sister Sister and Cleghorne!. He wrote and produced the American Airlines theme song. In 1999, he was signed to Sony Music as a writer/producer by Erica Greyson and Jim Vellutato. He began working with A-list writers with Sony and worked with artists like Pink, India Irie, Christina Aguilera, Pussycat Dolls, Raven Simone, Nicole Scherzinger, Kurupt and Fabolous. In addition to producing, he worked on the mixing side of production with Dave Pensado and Manny Marroquin.

In 2009, Automatic produced "Cradle to the Grave" and "She Is" for Bettina Bush which reached #2 and #4 on the Billboard Hot Single Sales Chart, respectively.

In Summer 2012, Automatic produced the hit single, "Uncommitted" for K-Pop sensation, Kim Junsu (Xia) of superstar pop group JYJ. The video for "Uncommitted" debuted at #1 in Korea and China. It has reached #1 on China's YinYueTai Chart, #1 on Peruvian Radio Charts, and #1 on Korea's Hanteo chart.[1] At Kim Junsu's recent concert in LA, Korean news site TV Daily reported: "the song produced together with Sony music producer AUTOMATIC, Uncommitted, is a chic urban pop song that attracted great attention."[2] Furthermore, the popular Canadian YouTube duo EatYourKimchi, well known for introducing K-Pop to foreigners, also reviewed Uncommitted: "From start to finish, the song is consistently solid and we’re totally digging it."[3] Also Kim Junsu described his recording experience with Automatic in his August 2012 Cyworld Music Interview: I also felt that I had a lot of freedom while recording my worldwide album. Because the composer respects the artist and the artist's feeling 120%, the recording was so pleasant. This time I choked and coughed a bit when I was singing, but the composer Automatic treated me so nicely, by telling me that I could rest as much as I want to or have a cup of warm tea and try again, that I didn't know what to do. It was pleasant to work with them."[4]

Automatic also performs as lead vocalist in the group Asphalt Messiah.

== InRage Entertainment ==
With his experience as a music producer, Automatic was exposed to a range of multiple music genres that included rock, country, pop, and R&B. The constant pressure from the industry wanting him to focus on one genre, sparked Automatic’s interest to develop his own label. Automatic partnered with corporate attorney, Roger Doumanian founder of Fresh Element, to create an entertainment company focused on music diversity. In 2016, InRage Entertainment was re-born, when Automatic partnered with his wife, Ebony Rae Vanderveer, to expand the model of the entertainment company. The label is currently based in Los Angeles, California and functions as a record label, artist development company and music, film and television production company.

== Production and engineering ==
Year	Artist	Song
2023	Sirena, Chyka Jackson	Hands Up - InRage Entertainment Recording Artist
2023	Dorian Aleccia	On The Cusp - EP - InRage Entertainment Recording Artist
2023	Chloe Madeline	Follows Me Home - InRage Entertainment Recording Artist
2022	Tally T	Give No Fucks - InRage Entertainment Recording Artist
2022	Caleb Soto	Past Tense - InRage Entertainment Recording Artist
2022	Autumn Cymone	Spoil Me - InRage Entertainment Recording Artist
2022	Chloe Madeline	Heartbreak Series - EP - InRage Entertainment Recording Artist
2022	Chyka Jackson	The Most - InRage Entertainment Recording Artist
2022	Caleb Soto	Let That Shit Go - InRage Entertainment Recording Artist
2022	ZorDonofDoom	Cracks in the Kindness - InRage Entertainment Recording Artist
2022	Chyka Jackson	STRATOSPHERE - InRage Entertainment Recording Artist
2022	Sirena	Playground - InRage Entertainment Recording Artist
2022	Starla Marie	PRIME - EP - InRage Entertainment Recording Artist
2022	In The Stars	In Retrograde - EP - InRage Entertainment Recording Artist
2022	Chloe Madeline	Heartbreak Song - InRage Entertainment Recording Artist
2022	Chyka Jackson	Made By God - From the Award-Winning Docuseries After theLockdown: Black in LA
2022	Tally T	Walk Up - InRage Entertainment Recording Artist
2022	Viva Victor	Omens - InRage Entertainment Recording Artist
2022	ZorDonofDoom	Fire & Snow - InRage Entertainment Recording Artist
2022	Kimiko	Shine - InRage Entertainment Recording Artist
2022	Ava-Riley	Second Chances - InRage Entertainment Recording Artist
2021	Chyka Jackson	U-Bae - InRage Entertainment Recording Artist
2021	In The Stars	HELLBENT - InRage Entertainment Recording Artist
2021	Trish	Do or Die - InRage Entertainment Recording Artist
2021	Tally T	Frosty - InRage Entertainment Recording Artist
2021	Chris Hutton	Rewind - InRage Entertainment Recording Artist
2021	Nyah	Trigger - InRage Entertainment Recording Artist
2021	Madeline	Bruised - InRage Entertainment Recording Artist
2021	Steve Englehart	Steve Englehart's Prism Club - Songs Inspired By The Creator of Shang-Chi feat. ALEXEY, M3DI, Nyah, Sirena, Chyka Jackson, Camber, & ZorDonofDoom - EP
2021	ALEXEY	ICING - InRage Entertainment Recording Artist
2021	Madeline	Pray For You - InRage Entertainment Recording Artist
2020	Camber	Noodles - InRage Entertainment Recording Artist
2020	Dorian Aleccia	Crumbling Down - InRage Entertainment Recording Artist
2020	In The Stars	Desperados - InRage Entertainment Recording Artist
2020	M3DI	Human - InRage Entertainment Recording Artist
2020	Alexey, Nyah	Coworkers Red Hook Remix - InRage Entertainment Recording Artist
2020	Nyah, Alexey	Slowly Dying Red Hook Remix - InRage Entertainment Recording Artist
2020	Chyka Jackson	Let Me Go - InRage Entertainment Recording Artist
2020	Kimiko	Karate - InRage Entertainment Recording Artist
2020	ZorDonofDoom	Bended Knee - InRage Entertainment Recording Artist
2020	Nyah	Slowly Dying - InRage Entertainment Recording Artist
2020	Johnny Gas	Airbnb - InRage Entertainment Recording Artist
2020	Estelle Morales	Rocks 'n' Chains - InRage Entertainment Recording Artist
2020	Caleb Soto	Sayin' Bye - InRage Entertainment Recording Artist
2020	Alexy	Coworkers - InRage Entertainment Recording Artist
2020	James Barmore, The Royal Quart	Frontline - InRage Entertainment Recording Artist
2020	Nyah	A Thousand Wishes - EP - InRage Entertainment Recording Artist
2020	James Barmore	Let's Get Stoned - InRage Entertainment Recording Artist
2020	KuiET	I'm the Man Now - InRage Entertainment Recording Artist
2020	Dorian Aleccia	So Hum - InRage Entertainment Recording Artist
2020	Nyah	Disconnected - Ep - InRage Entertainment Recording Artist
2020	Sunknee Angel	Chaos and Confusion - InRage Entertainment Recording Artist
2020	Klara Nazzal	Snakes - InRage Entertainment Recording Artist
2020	James Barmore, The Royal Quart	Saying Goodbye - InRage Entertainment Recording Artist
2020	Nyah	Flowers on My Grave - InRage Entertainment Recording Artist
2020	Klara Nazzal	Bleed - InRage Entertainment Recording Artist
2019	Chris Hutton	Ugly - InRage Entertainment Recording Artist
2019	Nyah	Maybe It's A Christmas Song - InRage Entertainment Recording Artist
2019	James Barmore	Hot Chocolate - EP - InRage Entertainment Recording Artist
2019	Chloe Madeline	States of Mine - EP - InRage Entertainment Recording Artist
2019	ZorDonofDoom	Hypocrisy - InRage Entertainment Recording Artist
2019	Sirena	Sangtha - EP - InRage Entertainment Recording Artist
2019	Camber	Neon Sundaes - Single - InRage Entertainment Recording Artist
2019	Nyah	Midnight - Single - InRage Entertainment Recording Artist
2019	James Barmore	Grand Rising - InRage Entertainment Recording Artist
2019	Autumn Cymone	Good Company - InRage Entertainment Recording Artist
2019	J'Dvonte	Trust - InRage Entertainment Recording Artist
2019	Dominique	Shhh Is Fire - InRage Entertainment Recording Artist
2019	Chyka Jackson	Dirt In My Eyes - InRage Entertainment Recording Artist
2019	Michael Duca	Last A While - InRage Entertainment Recording Artist
2019	ZorDonofDoom	The Confuzzled - EP - InRage Entertainment Recording Artist
2019	Camber	Bubblegum Piñata - InRage Entertainment Recording Artist
2019	Chloe Madeline	Stay Away - InRage Entertainment Recording Artist
2019	Dorian Aleccia	You Know Better - InRage Entertainment Recording Artist
2019	Raffaela	Butterfly Effect - EP - InRage Entertainment Recording Artist
2019	Sirena	Sirena - EP - InRage Entertainment Recording Artist
2019	Chloe Madeline	Magnetic - InRage Entertainment Recording Artist
2019	ZonDonofDoom	Absolute Confuzzlement - EP - InRage Entertainment Recording Artist
2019	Nyah	Empty Spaces - Single - InRage Entertainment Recording Artist
2019	Sirena	M.I.E.N - Single - InRage Entertainment Recording Artist
2019	Autumm Cymone	Crisco - Single - InRage Entertainment Recording Artist
2019	Sirena	I am (Doin' Alright) - Single - InRage Entertainment Recording Artist
2019	ZorDonofDoom	Welcome to My World - Single - InRage Entertainment Recording Artist
2018	Michael Duca	Kathleen - Single - InRage Entertainment Recording Artist
2018	Viva Victor	Sirens - Single - InRage Entertainment Recording Artist
2018	Raffaela Capp	I Love Me - InRage Entertainment Recording Artist
2018	Soto and The Krash	Soto and The Krash Unplugged, Vol. 1 - EP - InRage Entertainment Recording Artist
2018	Len Ron Hanks	Wendy City - Single - InRage Entertainment Recording Artist
2018	James Manning	Turn It Up - EP - InRage Entertainment Recording Artist
2018	James Barmore	Chromatic Spectrum - EP - InRage Entertainment Recording Artist
2017	James Barmore	New York, New York - Single - InRage Entertainment Recording Artist
2017	Soto and The Krash	War - Single - InRage Entertainment Recording Artist
2017	James Manning	White Flag - Single - InRage Entertainment Recording Artist
2017	James Barmore	Cherry Bomb - Single - InRage Entertainment Recording Artist
2017	Loomis	Look What You Made Me Do - Single - InRage Entertainment Recording Artist
2017	Autumn Cymone	Silence - Single - InRage Entertainment Recording Artist
2017	Autumn Cymone	Adrenaline - Single - InRage Entertainment Recording Artist
2017	Annie Cleary and The Fools	Annie Cleary and The Fools - EP - InRage Entertainment Recording Artist
2017	Johnny B	Change feat. Ebony Rae - Single - InRage Entertainment Recording Artist
2017	Soto and The Krash	Elephant In the Room - Single - InRage Entertainment Recording Artist
2017	Moe Adams	Let's Get Together Now feat. Automatic - Single - InRage Entertainment Recording Artist
2016	Kim Junsu (XIA)	Rock The World
2016	Raja-Neé	Don't Marry Her - Grammy nominated for Best Traditional R&B Performance & Best R&B Song
2016	Raja-Neé	The Battle (Angelo's Song) feat. Automatic - Grammy nominated for Best Contemporary Christian Music Performance/Song
2016	Twice	I'm Gonna Be A Star
2016	Gabriela N	Lie to Me - InRage Entertainment Recording Artist
2016	Kim Junsu (XIA)	Incredible
2016	Soto and The Krash	So Much Better - Single - InRage Entertainment Recording Artist
2015	The Unusual Prospects	Black Shiny Crome - Single - InRage Entertainment Recording Artist
2012	Kim Junsu (XIA)	Uncommitted - Artist's American debut single & music video
2009	Fabolous	Throw it in the Bag (Remix)
2009	Bettina Bush	She Is - #4 on Billboard Hot Single Sales Chart, & Cradle to the Grave - #2 on Billboard Hot Single Sales Chart
2001	Pink	Let's Get the Party Started (remix)
1997-1998	Raja-Neé	Double production deal with Jimmy Jam & Terry Lewis on Perspective Records/A&M Munchie
1997	Sweet Sable	Old Times Sake (remix)
1997	James Brown	How Long (remix)
1995-1997	Brownstone & Quo	Worked directly with Michael Jackson on vocal production & artist development on MJJ Music/Sony

== Film and television credits ==
Year	Film/Television	Studio	Credit
2002	13	Fox Searchlight	Cues
2000	We Can Play Together (PSA)	Fox	Sang & starred in international campaign for peace
1998	Hello! My Baby	WB Television Network	Cues
1998	Unhappily Ever After	WB Television Network	Cues
1998	Sister, Sister	WB Television Network	Cues
1998	Jamie Foxx Show	WB Television Network	Cues
1996	Low Down Dirty	WB Television Network	Soundtrack
1993	Stay Tuned	Morgan Creek	Cues
1993	Crush	Morgan Creek	"Taste" on Soundtrack
1993	Teacher		
1993	Nick Freno Licensed		"Taste" on Soundtrack
1993	Shame		

== Branding ==
Year	Brand	Description
2004	American Airlines	Theme song & Jingle
2003	Xbox	Music for Dead or Alive Xtreme Beach Volleyball

== Companies ==
Year	Company	Position
2014	InRage Entertainment	Executive Producer & Co-CEO
2004	Fresh Element	Investor, Multimedia director

== Singer/Musician ==
Year	Artist	Description	Release	Label
2013	Asphalt Messiah	Lead singer in rock/hip hop band	Dirty	InRage Entertainment
1994	Auto & Cherokee	Member of R&B Duo	Naked Music & Taste	Morgan Creek/Polydor Records
