= Musical December 2013 with Kim Junsu =

EP by XIA
- Released: 18 December 2013
- Recorded: 2013
- Genre: musical; K-ballad
- Language: Korean
- Label: C-Jes

XIA chronology
Incredible (2013)	Musical December 2013 with Kim Junsu (2013)	Flower (2015)

Singles from Musical December 2013 with Kim Junsu
- 1. "스치다 ft. Lyn" Released: 12 December 2013

Musical December 2013 With Kim Junsu is the first extended play (EP) by South Korean singer Kim Junsu. Marketed as a special album, The EP contains songs from the musical December, in which the singer plays the lead role on stage, as well as collaborations with Lyn and Gummy.

== Track list ==
No.	Title	Lyrics	Music	Length
1.	"12월 12 wol ( 12 Month)"	조현주 Jo Hyeon-ju	김광석 Kim Gwang-seok
2.	"스치다 Seuchida (ft. Lyn) (Brushing by/Serendipity)"	장차 Jangcha	박민주 Park Min-ju
3.	"사랑이라는 이유로 Sarangiraneun iyuro (ft. Gummy) (In The Name Of Love)"	김형석 Kim Hyeong-seok	김형석 Kim Hyeong-seok
4.	"너무 아픈 사랑은 사랑이 아니었음을 Neomu apeun sarangi anieosseumeul (Love that is too painful is not love)"	류근 Ryu Geun	김광석 Kim Gwang-seok
5.	"이등병의 편지 I deungbyeong-ui pyeonji (The Letter of a Soldier)"	김현성 Kim Hyeong-seok	김현성 Kim Hyeong-seok
6.	"12월 12 wol (instrumental) (12 Month)"		김광석 Kim Gwang-seok

== Charts ==
Chart (2014)	Peak position
Gaon Album Chart	1
