= FC MEN =

F ceMEN FC 멘
- Founded: 2011
- League: LigaAngelodeVoto
Home colours	Away colours

FC MEN is an all-star subunit of the South Korean football club Suwon Bluewings, composed of actors, singers, models and plays charity matches. The team officially joined Suwon Bluewings in April 2011 and wears the Bluewings uniform. FC MEN is headed by pop group JYJ's member Kim Junsu. In 2011, FC MEN won the Peace Star Cup against Miracle FC at the Suwon World Cup Stadium. The team's honorary coach is the South Korean national team's goalkeeper Jung Sung-Ryong.

== Current squad ==
As of 26 May 2015

Note: Flags indicate national team as defined under FIFA eligibility rules; some limited exceptions apply. Players may hold more than one non-FIFA nationality.

No.	Pos.	Nation	Player
1	GK	(South Korea) KOR	Im Young-phil
3	DF	(South Korea) KOR	Yoon Kwang-sun
5	FW	(South Korea) KOR	Yang Yo-seob
7	MF	(South Korea) KOR	Lee Wan
8	FW	(South Korea) KOR	Ji Chang-wook
9	FW	(South Korea) KOR	Nam Woo-hyun (replaced Kim Hyun-joong)
10	FW	(South Korea) KOR	Lee Gi-kwang
11	FW	(South Korea) KOR	Lee Seung-hyun
12	FW	(South Korea) KOR	Xia (captain)
13	FW	(South Korea) KOR	Ryu Jun-yeol
15	DF	(South Korea) KOR	Kim Jun-ho
17	MF	(South Korea) KOR	Yoon Kyung-sik
18	DF	(South Korea) KOR	Park Sung-kwang
19	FW	(South Korea) KOR	Lim Seul Ong
20	DF	(South Korea) KOR	Shim Ji-hwan
22	DF	(South Korea) KOR	Seo Kyung-jong
23	GK	(South Korea) KOR	Im Byung-han
25	DF	(South Korea) KOR	Jung Ji-man
28	DF	(South Korea) KOR	Shin Sung-yong
29	FW	(South Korea) KOR	Jeong Jin Woon
32	MF	(South Korea) KOR	Yoon Doo-joon
34	DF	(South Korea) KOR	Park Jung-jae
36	DF	(South Korea) KOR	Yong-in
100	DF	(South Korea) KOR	Kang Han-seung

== See also ==
- Suwon Samsung Bluewings
