= Uncommitted =

Uncommitted, may refer to:

- Uncommitted (song), recorded by South Korean singer XIA
- Uncommitted (voting option), available in some United States presidential primaries
