= Tarantallegra =

- Tarantallegra cover

Studio album by Kim Junsu
- Released: May 14, 2012
- Recorded: 2012
- Genre: Dance; Ballad; R&B
- Length: 44:13
- Language: Korean
- Label: C-JeS; A&G Modes
- Producer: XIA; Fraktal

Kim Junsu chronology
Xiah (2010)	Tarantallegra (2012)	Incredible (2013)

Singles from Tarantallegra
- 1. "사랑이 싫다구요 (I Don't Like Love)" Released: May 10, 2012; 2. "Tarantallegra" Released: May 13, 2012

Tarantallegra is the first Korean studio album by South Korean singer Kim Junsu under the stage name XIA. It was released on May 14, 2012, through C-Jes Entertainment and became one of the highest selling solo albums in 2012 on the Gaon chart.

== Composition ==
Xia participated in the producing, composing, and writing lyrics for most of the twelve songs. The album consists of several genre from Dance, Pop Ballad, and R&B.

== Background and release ==
On May 10, ahead of the album's release, Xia released "사랑이 싫다구요 (I Don't Like Love)", a song used as the soundtrack for Korean drama "Rooftop Prince". On May 14, C-JeS published the music video for "Tarantallegra", with choreography by Jeri Slaughter, an American choreographer whom Xia has previously worked with.

On June 11, Xia released the dance version music video for "Tarantallegra". Unlike the original music video, the new version video focuses on the visuals and the choreography. It also contains previously unseen footage.

On July 16, Following with an announcement of a worldwide tour, XIA revealed to be working his repackaged album for entered world market. The repackaged version will include an English single and its music video will be produced in the U.S. C-JeS Entertainment stated that renowned staff members in America will be taking part in the new album and music video. He will then embark on a world tour covering North America, South America and Europe with plans to make stops in two or three cities per continent. Instead of a repackaged album, XIA released a single album entitled Uncommitted.

== Reception ==
On May 4, shortly after pre-orders for Tarantallegra began on both online and offline stores, the online music market site Synnara experienced a server crash due to the sudden, overwhelming response. Xia's agency, C-JeS Entertainment revealed that the album has reached 100,000 copies in pre-orders. It also topped Japan's iTunes' pop albums chart without any promotion. The album is revealed to have had a greater reaction from fans than anticipated, leading to sell-outs. According to Gaon, 122,000 copies of the album has been sold as of the end of May.

== Xia 1st Asia Tour Concert – Tarantallegra ==
XIA 1st World Tour Concert
- World tour by Kim Junsu
- Location: Asia, North America, Europe
- Associated album: Tarantallegra
- Start date: May 19, 2012
- End date: November 30, 2012
- Legs: 11
- No. of shows: 7 in Asia; 3 in North America; 2 in South America; 1 in Europe; 13 in total

Kim Junsu concert chronology
- Xia 1st World Tour Concert (2012); Xia 2nd Asia Tour Concert – Incredible (2013)

XIA 1st World Tour Concert is the first solo concert tour by JYJ's member Kim Junsu in support of his debut solo album Tarantallegra, which was released on May 14, 2012. The tour kicked off its first show in Seoul, South Korea on May 19, 2012, at Seoul's Jamsil Indoor Stadium. According to MTV K, XIA was "the first South Korean male artist to embark on a true world tour". His tour includes stops in Thailand, Indonesia, the United States, Europe and South America.

The 17,000 tickets for the Seoul concerts were sold out within five minutes of going on sale. The Asian leg of the tour drew an audience of 40,000.

Set list
- Intro: VCR Tarantallegra
- "Breath"
- "No Gain"
- "Lullaby"
- "Intoxication"
- "Set Me Free"
- VCR
- "You Are So Beautiful"
- Opening Ment
- "알면서도" (Even Though You Already Know)
- "돌고 돌아도" (Turn Around And Around)
- Dance Break
- "The Last Dance"
- "I am, I am Music"
- "Why Don't You Love Me"
- VCR
- "Tarantallegra"
- "Fever"
- "Too Love"
- "Mission"^{1}
- Ment
- "사랑이 싫다구요" (I Don't Like Love)
- "이슬을 머금은 나무" (The Tree Covered The Dew)
- Encore
- "앵콜 낙엽" (Fallen Leaves)

=== Shows ===
Date	City	Country	Venue	Attendance
May 19, 2012	Seoul	South Korea	Jamsil Indoor Stadium	40,000
May 20, 2012	Seoul	South Korea	Jamsil Indoor Stadium	40,000
May 27, 2012	Bangkok	Thailand	Royal Paragon Hall	40,000
June 16, 2012	Jakarta	Indonesia	JITEC	40,000
June 23, 2012	Taipei	Taiwan	NTU Sports Center	40,000
July 7, 2012	Shanghai	China	Shanghai International Gymnastic Center	40,000
August 26, 2012	Hong Kong	China	Hong Kong Convention & Exhibition Centre	40,000
August 30, 2012	New York City	United States	Hammerstein Ballroom	—
September 2, 2012	Los Angeles	United States	Hollywood Palladium	2,000
September 6, 2012	Mexico City	Mexico	Blackberry Auditorium	3,500
September 8, 2012	São Paulo	Brazil	Espacio Victory	1,300
September 10, 2012	Santiago	Chile	Teatro Caupolican	3,000
November 30, 2012	Oberhausen	Germany	Turbinenhalle	1,800
Total				53,800

== Track listing ==
No.	Title	Lyrics	Music	Arranger	Length
1.	"Sunset"	-	Xia	Xia	1:15
2.	"Tarantallegra" (feat. Flowsik)	JUNO	Xia	Xia	4:16
3.	"Set Me Free" (feat. Bizzy)	Xia, Fraktal	Xia, Fraktal	Fraktal	3:37
4.	"No Gain"	Kim Jaejoong	Kim Jaejoong	Kwon Bin-ki	3:49
5.	"사랑이 싫다구요" (I Don't Like Love)	Jung Hye-sung	Jung Hye-sung	Jung Hye-sung	3:43
6.	"돌고 돌아도" (Around and Around)	JUNO	Xia, Kim Sae-jin	Xia, Kim Sae-jin	3:40
7.	"Intoxication"	Xia	Xia	Xia	3:56
8.	"Breath" (feat. Double K)	Xia	Xia	Xia	3:23
9.	"알면서도" (Even Though I Already Know)	Kim Sae-jin	Kim Sae-jin, PJ	PJ	3:36
10.	"Lullaby" (feat. Gaeko of Dynamic Duo)	Xia, Fraktal	Xia	Fraktal	4:48
11.	"Fever"	Xia, JUNO	Xeno, Jedi	Xeno	3:49
12.	"이슬을 머금은 나무" (The Tree Covered In Dew)	Xia	Xia	Sung Jung-jin	5:01

== Charts ==
=== Singles chart ===
Song	Peak chart position	
Song	KOR	
Song	Gaon Chart	K-Pop Billboard
"사랑이 싫다구요 (I Don't Like Love)"	18	15
"Tarantallegra"	22	39

=== Album chart ===
Chart	Peak position
South Korea Hanteo Weekly Album Chart	1
South Korea Gaon Weekly Album Chart	1
South Korea Gaon Monthly Album Chart	2
Japan Oricon Weekly Album Chart	9
Japan Oricon Monthly Album Chart	18
Japan Oricon Weekly Western Album Chart	1
United States Billboard World Albums	10

=== Other charted songs ===
Song
Song	Gaon Chart
"Set Me Free" (Feat. Bizzy)	69
"No Gain"	54
"돌고 돌아도"	50
"Intoxication"	83
"Breath" (Feat. Double K)	78
"알면서도"	61
"Lullaby" (Feat. 개코 Of Dynamic Duo)	45
"Fever"	81
"이슬을 머금은 나무"	67

== Sales ==
Chart	Sales
South Korea Gaon Physical Sales	127,620
Japan Oricon Physical Sales	19,000

== Release history ==
Country	Date	Format	Distributing Label
South Korea	May 14, 2012	Digital download, CD	C-JeS Entertainment/A&G Modes
Worldwide	May 15, 2012	Digital download	
