= Thank U For =

Single by XIA
- Released: December 24, 2012
- Recorded: 2012
- Genre: Christmas
- Length: 4:34
- Label: C-JeS
- Songwriter(s): Shikata; Reo; Juno; Kim Ji-na
- Producer(s): Shikata

XIA singles chronology
"Uncommitted" (2012)	"Thank U For" (2012)	"11am" (2013)

"Thank U For" is a song recorded by South Korean singer XIA, released on December 24, 2012. The digital single intended to be a Christmas Eve present for his fans. The song was written by Japanese producers Shikata and Reo, with lyrics penned by XIA's twin brother, Juno and Kim Ji-na.

"Thank U For" peaked at number 9 on the weekly chart by South Korea's record chart Gaon.
The song was performed live at XIA's year-end concert "2012 XIA Ballad & Musical Concert with Orchestra".

== Track listing ==
No.	Title	Lyrics	Music	Length
1.	"Thank U For"	Juno, Kim Ji-na	Shikata, Reo	4:34
2.	"Thank U For" (instrumental)		Shikata, Reo	4:34
