= Xignature =

Studio album by XIA
- Released: May 30, 2016
- Genre: Hip hop; EDM; R&B
- Length: 48:57
- Language: Korean
- Label: C-JeS; LOEN

XIA chronology
Yesterday (2015)	Xignature (2016)	Pit a Pat (2020)

Singles from Xignature
- 1. "Rock The World" Released: May 30, 2016; 2. "Sweet Melody" Released: May 30, 2016

Xignature is the fourth studio album by South Korean singer Kim Junsu, released under his stage name XIA on May 30, 2016. The album contains thirteen tracks including double lead single "Rock The World" and "Sweet Melody". The album also features several artists The Quiett, Automatic, Crucial Star, and Paloalto.

== Background and release ==
On May 9, C-Jes announced that XIA would set to be release his fourth full-length Xignature (blend of his stage name "Xia" and the word "Signature") and started pre-orders in the same day. The album features various genres, such as, Hip Hop, EDM, R&B, Urban, etc.

On May 11, the album's tracklist was revealed. On May 17, "Rock The World" was revealed as the album's lead single.

On May 18, the promotional single "..Is You" was released. On May 24, the music teaser of "Rock The World" was released.

On May 26, the album's audio preview was revealed. On May 28, the music video was released prior the album's release through Naver TV Cast. The album officially released on May 30.

== Commercial performance ==
The promotional single "..Is You" debuted at No. 19 on the Gaon digital chart, selling 72,183 copies in its first week.

Xignature debuted at number one on South Korea's Gaon Album Chart in the chart issue dated May 29–June 4, 2016.

== Promotion ==
XIA promoted the album with a live outdoor showcase held at the east gate of the COEX Mall in Seoul on May 30 and attendance by 3,000 fans. He also had his own segment on Melon Radio.

To commemorate the release of the album, XIA would begin his fifth Asia tour kick-off in Seoul's Olympic Park Gymnastics Stadium on May 11, 2016.

== Track listing ==
No.	Title	Lyrics	Music	Length
1.	"Rock The World" (featuring The Quiett & Automatic)	Xia	The Vanderveers	3:58
2.	"Sweet Melody" (featuring Ben)	Xia	Frakial	3:24
3.	"This Love Shouldn't Go Away" (이 사랑을 떠나가면 안돼요)	Gaemi	Gaemi	4:04
4.	"Pretty" (예뻐)	Xia, J.Kimb	President, Kim Yoo Chan	3:57
5.	"Fun Drive" ((FUN 드라이브) featuring Crucial Star)	Xia, Kwon Bin Gi	Xia, Kwon Bin Gi	3:35
6.	"Break My Heart"	Park Eun Woo	Airwave Assassins	3:21
7.	"Still" (여전히)	Xia, J.Kimb	President, Yoo Yeong Joon	3:57
8.	"Magic Carpet"	Xia	Tonino Speciale, Michael Angelo, Michael Harwood	3:21
9.	"Don't Forget" (잊지는 마)	Kim Se Jin, Yoda	Kim Se Jin, Park Chan	3:45
10.	"XITIZEN" (featuring Paloalto)	Xia, Park Il	Xia, Park Il	3:27
11.	"You're Irreplaceable" (다른 누구도 대신 못할 너)	Jung Key	Jung Key	4:24
12.	"Tonight"	President, Parking Lot	Suran, Made By, Kaiser	3:57
13.	"..Is You"	Seonwoo Jungah, Realmeee	Seonwoo Jungah	3:41

== Release history ==
Country	Date	Label(s)	Format
South Korea	May 30, 2016	C-JeS, LOEN	Digital download, CD
Worldwide	May 30, 2016	C-JeS, LOEN	Digital download
Japan	June 9, 2016	C-JeS, LOEN	CD
