= Ji Woon-soo's Stroke of Luck =

South Korean television series

- Promotional poster
- Also known as: Stroke of Luck
- Hangul: 지운수대통
- Hanja: 池雲秀大通
- RR: Ji Unsu daetong
- MR: Chi Unsu taet'ong
- Genre: Comedy
- Written by: Lee Kyung-mi
- Directed by: Moon Woo-sung; Oh Sang-hoon
- Starring: Im Chang-jung; Seo Young-hee
- Country of origin: South Korea
- Original language: Korean
- No. of episodes: 20

Production
- Executive producer: Baek Jin-dong
- Production location: Korea
- Running time: Saturdays and Sundays at 18:50 (KST)
- Production company: Media 100

Original release
- Network: TV Chosun
- Release: 21 April – 24 June 2012

Ji Woon-soo's Stroke of Luck (Korean: 지운수대통) is a 2012 South Korean television series that aired on cable channel TV Chosun from April 21 to June 24, 2012, on Saturdays and Sundays at 18:50 for 20 episodes. It marks film actor Im Chang-jung's first TV starring role in his 21-year career.

== Plot ==
Ji Woon-soo is an average office worker who dreams of turning his life around. He is unlucky at everything he does and is never proactive about anything. Until one day, he experiences a stroke of extremely good luck and wins the lottery, going through the many ups and downs that follow.

== Cast ==
- Im Chang-jung - Ji Woon-soo
- Seo Young-hee - Lee Eun-hee
- Lee Se-eun - Han Soo-kyung
- Choi Kyu-hwan - assistant manager Cha Dae-ri
- Yoon Da-hoon - section chief Choi
- Lee Moon-sik - Company president Baek
- Park Hyo-jun - Oh Kyung-hoon
- Lee Kyung-jin - Mrs. Na, Woon-soo's mother
- Choi Joo-bong - Mr. Lee, Eun-hee's father
- Hong Yeo-jin - Mrs. Jeon, Eun-hee's mother
- Yoo Jae-myung - Min Seo's father
- Lee Joo-hyun - Lee Geum-hee
- Jang Won-young - Woon-chil
- Shin Seo-hyun - Seo-hyun
- Hwang Tae-kwang - Ji Jae-soo
- Zuno - Lee Dong-hee
- Kang Jae-sub - Moon Sang-joong
- Yoo Min-ho - Han Joong-il
- Moon Ji-young - Jin Sang-hee
- Jung Ji-yoon as Reporter
- Choi Daniel - cameo
- Han Yeo-wool
