= Incredible (Xia album) =

Studio album by XIA
- Released: 15 July 2013
- Recorded: 2013
- Genre: Pop; R&B; dance
- Language: Korean
- Label: C-JeS; LOEN

XIA chronology
Tarantallegra (2012)	Incredible (2013)	Musical December 2013 with Kim Junsu (2013)

Singles from Incredible
- 1. "11 AM" Released: 1 July 2013; 2. "Incredible" Released: 15 July 2013

Incredible is the second Korean studio album by South Korean singer XIA, released on July 15, 2013.

== Promotion ==
The day of its release, XIA held a live showcase on MelOn TV and LOEN Entertainment, the latter via YouTube and uStream.

To commemorate the release of Incredible, XIA also held his second solo tour XIA 2nd Asia Tour Concert Incredible which kicked off from Seoul with 18,000 tickets sold in 15 minutes.

== Track list ==
No.	Title	Lyrics	Music	Length
1.	"No Reason"	Kim Tae-wan	Kim Tae-wan	3:36
2.	"Rainy Eyes"	Kim Ji-hyang	XIA, Gwon Bin-gi	3:16
3.	"Apology" (미안)	Hee Jang-nim, Lee Cheol	Hee Jang-nim, 2JAJA	4:27
4.	"Chocolate Girl"	Kim Bag-sa, Oh Hyun-ju	Kim Bag-sa	3:08
5.	"Incredible" (Feat. Quincy Brown)	XIA, Bruce 'Automatic' Vanderveer	Bruce 'Automatic' Vanderveer	3:18
6.	"Confession" (나 지금 고백한다; Feat. Gilme)	XIA	XIA, Park Il	3:22
7.	"Don't Leave" (가지마)	JUNO, J.Kimb	Hee Jang-nim, 2JAJA	4:13
8.	"Turn It Up" (Feat. Dok2)	JUNO, XIA	Fraktal	3:23
9.	"Fantasy"	Park Il, Kim Tae-wan	Park Il, Kim Tae-wan	3:39
10.	"Funny Song" (이 노래 웃기지; With Boom)	XIA	XIA	3:04
11.	"I'm In Love" (사랑하나 봐)	Jeon Hae-sung	Jeon Hae-sung	3:28
12.	"11AM" (11시 그 적당함)	Francis	Francis	3:33
