= Xiah (EP) =

- Xiah Jacket A cover

EP by Kim Junsu
- Released: 26 May 2010
- Recorded: 2010
- Genre: J-pop; R&B
- Language: Japanese
- Label: Rhythm Zone

Kim Junsu chronology
Xiah (2010)	Tarantallegra (2012)

Xiah is the debut Japanese EP by South Korean singer Kim Junsu of JYJ. It was released by Rhythm Zone on 26 May 2010 in two versions: Jacket A, a CD+DVD version which includes a music video with 4 tracks, and Jacket B, a CD only version which contains 5 tracks.

Despite having TVXQ's activities on hiatus due to a lawsuit filed by Xiah and two other members of TVXQ (Kim Jaejoong and Park Yuchun) against their South Korean label SM Entertainment, he decided to debut as a solo act in Japan. Prior to its release, 160,000 copies of the album had been pre-ordered. It came in #2 on the Oricon Daily Charts with first day sales amounted to 118,510 units.

== Album ==
The EP consists of title song "Intoxication", an R&B track and two ballads, "君がいれば～Beautiful Love～" and "悲しみのゆくえ".

"君がいれば～Beautiful Love～" and "Intoxication" were featured in Bee-TV's drama「君がいれば～Beautiful Love～」, starring JYJ member Yoochun and Japanese actress Aya Ōmasa. The other track on the album, "悲しみのゆくえ", is featured in the drama 5年後のラブレター (A Love Letter 5 Years From Now) as its theme song.

On May 22, Xiah performed "Intoxication" for the first time at the Girls Awards 2010, a fashion and music event held at Yoyogi First Gymnasium in Japan. The other songs on the EP were also performed at JYJ's four-day Thanksgiving Live in Dome Tour concert held at Osaka Dome and Tokyo Dome in June. Xiah also performed "Intoxication" at Avex's nationwide a-nation tour throughout August. In October 2010, Xiah sang the Korean version of "Intoxication" at the Kim Junsu Musical Concert, Levay with Friends.

== Musical style ==
"Intoxication", the lead track of the album, features a sexual theme based on the lyrics itself. The style is influenced by African-American R&B music and the lyrics are influenced by the world's point of view. The song is meant to give a masculine feel.

"君がいれば～Beautiful Love～" is specially written for the drama「Beautiful Love～君がいれば～」itself. The song's lyrics are based on the drama's plot development, about how Yoonsu (Yoochun), a lonely stuck-up rich tycoon falls in love with a Japanese girl Hinata (Aya Ōmasa).

"悲しみのゆくえ" is a sorrowful song, meant to express the feeling of silent grief and intended as the opposite of "Intoxication". It depicts a feeling of helplessness.

== Track listing ==
Jacket A:CD+DVD
No.	Title	Writer(s)	Arranger	Length
1.	"Intoxication"	Xiah	Xiah	4:00
2.	"君がいれば～Beautiful Love～"	Shinjiroh Inoue	Shinjiroh Inoue	5:02
3.	"Intoxication (Instrumental)"	Xiah	Xiah	4:00
4.	"君がいれば～Beautiful Love～ (Instrumental)"	Shinjiroh Inoue	Shinjiroh Inoue	4:59
Total length:				18:01

DVD
No.	Title	Length
1.	"Intoxication PV"	04:40

Jacket B:CD only
No.	Title	Writer(s)	Arranger	Length
1.	"Intoxication"	Xiah	Xiah	4:00
2.	"悲しみのゆくえ"	Shinjiroh Inoue	Shinjiroh Inoue	5:30
3.	"君がいれば～Beautiful Love～ (Short Version)"	Shinjiroh Inoue	Shinjiroh Inoue	3:44
4.	"Intoxication (Instrumental)"	Xiah	Xiah	4:00
5.	"悲しみのゆくえ (Instrumental"	Shinjiroh Inoue	Shinjiroh Inoue	5:30
Total length:				22:44
