= Juno (singer) =

South Korean singer (born 1986)

Kim Jun-ho 김준호
- Also known as: Juno; Zuno 金俊浩 (Jin Jun-hao) ジュノ (Juno) 주노 (Juno/Zuno)
- Born: 김준호 (Kim Jun-ho); December 15, 1986 (age 39); Gyeonggi Province, South Korea
- Origin: South Korea
- Genres: J-pop, Mandopop
- Occupation: Singer
- Years active: 2008–present
- Labels: BIAS Entertainment (China); Avex Trax (Japan); C-JeS Entertainment (Korea)
- Website: juno-jp.net

- Korean name
- Hangul: 김준호
- RR: Gim Junho
- MR: Kim Chunho

Kim Jun-ho (Korean: 김준호; born on December 15, 1986) is a South Korean singer, who is mainly active in Japan and China, where he is more well known by his stage names Juno and Zuno. His younger fraternal twin brother is Kim Junsu. In 2014, he changed his name to Kim Moo-young.

== Career ==
=== Pre-debut ===
Kim Jun-ho started playing baseball in elementary school and was scouted by the professional South Korean team SK Wyverns during high school. He attended Dong-eui University in Busan but dropped out during his freshman year due to a sports injury, which also ended his career as a professional baseball player.

=== 2010-12: Debut in China and Japan, acting debut ===
In 2010, after having studied acting for two years and having spent a year at Beijing Normal University, Kim made his singing debut in China as Zuno.

A year later, the singer debuted in Japan with his single album Fate as Juno. The second single album Believe placed third on the Oricon daily chart and became the theme song for a Japanese Bee TV drama. Kim's third single album Everything entered the Oricon Charts in second place and reached number ten on the weekly charts.

In 2012, Kim made his acting debut in the Korean drama Stroke of Luck.

Kim is currently a member of the South Korean all star football team FC MEN.

== Discography ==
=== Albums ===
Year	Title	Details	Track listing
2012	STYLE	Released: 17 October 2012 (Japan); Label: Avex Trax/Rhythm Zone; Further Release History: Japan; Released: 17 October 2012; Label: Avex Trax/Rhythm Zone; Taiwan; Released: 19 October 2012; Label: Avex Taiwan; Hong Kong; Released: 24 October 2012; Label: Avex Hong Kong Limited; Language: Japanese; Charts: Oricon Weekly Album: #41	Track listing: CD; 1. "Seduction"; 2. "Fate"; 3. "その髪も 指も 唇も..." (Sono Kami Mo Yubi Mo Kuchibiru Mo); 4. "逢いたい" (Aitai); 5. "Believe... ~君を信じて~" (Kimi Wo Shinjite); 6. "Look At Me" [Japanese Ver., originally Korean]; 7. "I Love You" [Japanese Ver., originally Chinese]; 8. "With"; 9. "Everything"; 10. "Anywhere"; DVD 1 (2DVD and 1DVD edition only); 1. "Seduction" (Music Clip); 2. "Fate" (Music Clip); 3. "その髪も 指も 唇も..." (Music Clip); 4. "Believe... ~君を信じて~" (Music Clip); 5. "Everything" (Music Clip); 6. "Seduction" (Making Clip); 7. "その髪も 指も 唇も..." (Making Clip); DVD 2 (2DVD edition only); 1. Juno in Korea; 2. Recording of special footage in Korea

=== EPs ===
Year	Title	Details	Track listing
2010	Beginning	Released: 29 March 2010 (China); Label: BIAS Entertainment; Language: Chinese	Track listing: CD; 1. "Nothing To Lose"; 2. "I Love You"; 3. "Nothing To Lose" [Inst.]; 4. "I Love You" [Inst.]
2011	Fate	Released: 31 August 2011 (Japan); Label: Avex Trax/Rhythm Zone; Language: Japanese; Charts: Oricon Weekly Single: #15	Track listing: CD; 1. "Fate"; 2. "Cry"; 3. "Fate" [Inst.]; 4. "Cry" [Inst.]; 5. "Nothing To Lose" [Japanese Ver., originally Chinese] (CD edition only); DVD (CD+DVD edition only); 1. "Fate" (Music Clip)
2011	Believe... ~Kimi Wo Shinjite~	Released: 21 December 2011 (Japan); Label: Avex Trax/Rhythm Zone; Language: Japanese; Charts: Oricon Weekly Single: #10	Track listing Jacket A and C: CD; 1. "Believe... ~君を信じて~" (Kimi Wo Shinjite); 2. "Bad Girl"; 3. "Believe... ~君を信じて~" (Kimi Wo Shinjite) [Inst.]; 4. "Bad Girl" [Inst.]; DVD (Jacket A only); 1. "Believe... ~君を信じて~" (Music Clip); Jacket B: CD; 1. "Believe... ~君を信じて~" (Kimi Wo Shinjite); 2. "Believe... ~君を信じて~" (Kimi Wo Shinjite) [Inst.]; DVD; 1. Bee TV drama footage
2012	Everything	Released: 16 May 2012 (Japan); Label: Avex Trax/Rhythm Zone; Language: Japanese; Charts: Oricon Weekly Single: #10; Oricon Monthly Single: #46	Track listing: CD; 1. "Everything"; 2. "Triangle Love"; 3. "Everything" [Inst.]; 4. "Triangle Love" [Inst.]; DVD (CD+DVD edition only); 1. "Everything" (Music Clip)
2013	Ring	Released: 3 July 2013 (Japan); Label: Avex Trax; Language: Japanese	Track listing: CD; 1. "Ring"; 2. "YOU"; 3. "Ring" [Inst.]; 4. "YOU" [Inst.]; DVD (CD+DVD edition only); 1. "Ring" (Music Clip); 2. "Ring" (Making Clip)

=== Soundtrack appearances ===
- 2012: "Look At Me" - Stroke of Luck OST (TV Chosun drama)

=== As featured artist ===
- 2011: Ayumi Hamasaki feat. Juno - "Why..." (from Five)

=== Music videos ===
Year	Song	Album
2010	"Nothing To Lose"	Beginning
2011	"Fate"	Fate
2011	"Believe... ~君を信じて~" (Kimi Wo Shinjite)	Believe... ~Kimi Wo Shinjite~
2011	Ayumi Hamasaki - "Why..."	Five
2012	"Everything"	Everything
2012	"Seduction"	STYLE
2012	"その髪も 指も 唇も..." (Sono Kami Mo Yubi Mo Kuchibiru Mo)	STYLE
2013	"Ring"	Ring

=== DVDs ===
Year	Title	Details	Track listing
2010	Secret Diary	Released: 13 November 2010 (Singapore); Label: Quest ID, BIAS Entertainment; Format: 2DVD; Info: Limited release (500 copies), exclusively for fan meeting attendees	Track listing Disc 1: Showcase in Beijing; Disc 2: Private story
2012	History Vol.1	Released: 14 March 2012 (Japan); Label: Avex Trax/Rhythm Zone; Format: 1DVD	Track listing: 1. Making of first photobook 2. Event footage 3. Making of Fate (Jacket shooting, MV making, ...); 4. "JUNO-YA!" fan club event 5. Making of Believe (Jacket shooting, MV); 6. Promotional activities

=== Songwriting credits ===
Song	Album	Contribution
"Mission"	JYJ: In Heaven	lyricist
"Tarantallegra"	XIA: Tarantallegra	lyricist
"돌고 돌아도" (Even Though I Turn Around and Around)	XIA: Tarantallegra	lyricist
"Fever"	XIA: Tarantallegra	lyricist
"Tarantallegra (Oriental Ver.)"	XIA: Uncommitted	lyricist
"Thank U For"	XIA: Thank U For	lyricist
"가지마" (Don't Go)	XIA: Incredible	lyricist
"Turn It Up"	XIA: Incredible	lyricist
"나비" (Butterfly)	XIA: Flower	lyricist
"Love You More"	XIA: Flower	lyricist
"Hello Hello "	XIA: Flower	lyricist

== Filmography ==
=== Films ===
Year	Title	Original title	Role	Notes
2014	Urban Games			Chinese

=== Television series ===
Year	Title	Original title	Role	Network	Notes
2012	Ji Woon-soo's Stroke of Luck	지운수대통	Lee Dong-hee (Eps. 2,5,6,8,10-16,18)	TV Chosun	Korean drama
2012	Pillow Talk	ピロートーク〜ベッドの思惑〜	Sunri (Ep. 9 "Billiken", dated 2012-11-29)	KTV	Japanese sitcom
2013	Empress Ki	기황후	guard	MBC	Korean drama

=== Variety shows ===
Year	Title	Original title	Role	Network	Notes
2008	Star's Friend	스타의 친구를 소개합니다	Guest (Ep. dated 2008-11-15)	MBC	Korean
2012	Sports Danshi	最強スポーツ男子頂上決戦	Guest (Ep. dated 2012-11-21)	TBS	Japanese

=== Music video appearances ===
- 2012: Toko Furuuchi - "時間を止めて" (Romaji: Jikan wo Tomete, English: Stop Time) (from Yume no Tsuzuki)

== Endorsement ==
- 2009: Food Sixty (Korean: 삼육식품)
