= Kakao M =

South Korean entertainment company

Kakao M Corporation
- Native name: 주식회사 카카오엠
- Formerly: Seoul Records (1978–2000, 2005–2008); YBM Seoul Records (2000–2005); LOEN Entertainment (2008–2018)
- Industry: Music; entertainment
- Founded: October 1978; 48 years ago
- Founder: Min Yeong-bin
- Defunct: March 2, 2021
- Fate: Merged into KakaoPage, subsequently renamed Kakao Entertainment. Business and subsidiaries were put up as the Kakao Entertainment M Company division
- Successor: Kakao Entertainment
- Headquarters: Seoul, South Korea
- Services: Music production, publishing, distribution, and artist development and management
- Subsidiaries: see list
- Website: kakao-m.com

Kakao M Corporation (Korean: 주식회사 카카오엠; formerly Seoul Records, YBM Seoul Records and LOEN Entertainment) was a South Korean entertainment company established by Min Yeong-bin in 1978. It was one of the largest co-publisher companies in South Korea. The company operated as a record label, talent agency, music production company, event management, concert production company, and music publishing house.

In 2015, the company was the leading record company in South Korea by net revenue according to the statistics compiled by the Korea Music Content Industry Association (KMCIA) through the Gaon Music Chart (30.4%); it was also the second leading company in terms of album sales (25.4%). LOEN Entertainment became a subsidiary of Kakao in January 2016 and was subsequently renamed two years later.

Online music sales accounted for most of the company's profit, with 93.9% of revenue coming from online music sales. The label also distributed CDs of some other entertainment agencies in South Korea through its branch 1theK, but made less than 5% of its revenue through them.

On March 2, 2021, the company became defunct upon merging into KakaoPage. The merger resulted in the formation of a new company, Kakao Entertainment.

== History ==
=== 1978–2008: Founding of Seoul Records ===
Kakao M was founded as Seoul Records in 1978 by Min Yeong-bin as a subsidiary of YBM Sisa, a company mainly involved in creating language-learning tapes. The company was officially registered in 1982, and in 1984 it began to produce and distribute records of classical and traditional music. It was registered as a venture capital company in 1999 when it began to sell albums while operating an online shop. In 2000, the company's name was changed to YBM Seoul Records and it began to operate on KOSDAQ. The company joined the IFPI in 2003. Korean conglomerate SK Telecom bought a 60% share of the company in 2005, and YBM Seoul Records subsequently became part of SK Group.

=== 2008–2016: Name change to LOEN Entertainment ===
As of 2008, the company was known as LOEN Entertainment. LOEN was said to be an abbreviation for Live On Entertainment Networks or LOve + ENtertainment.

LOEN took charge of SK Telecom's online music distribution service, MelOn, in 2009. MelOn is currently the most used online music sales site in South Korea.

In 2012, the company signed a deal with streaming site Viki so that content from their artists (such as IU, Brown Eyed Girls and Drunken Tiger) would be featured on their site.

In August 2012, the recording artists under LOEN collaborated to release a collaborative EP titled LOEN Tree Summer Story under the collective title 'LOEN Tree'.

On July 18, 2013, Affinity Equity Partners, through its subsidiary Star Invest Holdings Ltd., bought 52.56% of LOEN Entertainment's shares, leaving SK Group with only 15%. Five months later, Star Invest Holdings acquired RealNetworks, Inc.'s 8.83% stake in the company. The company was reorganized to include two labels: "LOEN Tree" (Jo Yeong-cheol) and "Collabodadi" (Shinsadong Tiger).

On December 18, 2013, LOEN Entertainment acquired 70% of shares in Starship Entertainment, making it an independent subsidiary of the company.

=== 2016–2021: Acquisition by Kakao and name change ===
On January 11, 2016, LOEN Entertainment was acquired by Kakao Corporation.

On May 11, 2017, LOEN Entertainment announced its strategic drama production alliance with CJ E&M's drama production subsidiary Studio Dragon Corporation. Among the plans under the alliance is producing dramas based on web novels and webtoons on KakaoPage and Daum Webtoons (which copyrights are managed by Podotree, the web literature subsidiary of Kakao). (LOEN Entertainment first entered the drama production industry three years ago through the cable-web drama Another Parting, which starred Seo In-guk and Wang Ji-won.) On August 25, LOEN Entertainment announced that its joint venture with Studio Dragon will be called as Mega Monster.

The company has also signed actress Kim So-hyun through setting up her own independent label, E&T Story Entertainment, which is led by her long-time manager Park Chan-woo.

Upon approval by the company's board of directors in a December 20 meeting, the company is known as Kakao M Corporation (Korean: 주식회사 카카오엠) since March 23, 2018. The letter M in the new corporate name stands for three things: Melon (the company's flagship online music service), Music (the company's core business) and Media (another business that the company will advance to in the future). The company will now also have a corporate catchphrase, We Entertain.

Barely a month before the company's relaunch under its new name, Sean Seong-hoon Park resigned from both his positions as CEO of the company and chief strategy officer of its parent company, and later moved to Netmarble Games. He was replaced by Melon division head Lee Jae-wook.

On February 28, 2021, Kakao M's music was removed from Spotify after its licensing deal with the streaming service expired. They had addressed the removal in a statement, citing the streaming service as the party who had ensued it. On March 11, 2021, Kakao M renewed its licensing deal with Spotify.

In March 2021, Kakao M and KakaoPage merged into a company named Kakao Entertainment, while having its own representative system under the name "M Company" there.

== Corporate identity ==
=== Company name ===
The company name was Kakao M, the letter M standing for:

- Melon (the company's flagship online music service)
- Music (the company's core business)
- Media (another business that the company would advance to in the future)

=== Logos ===
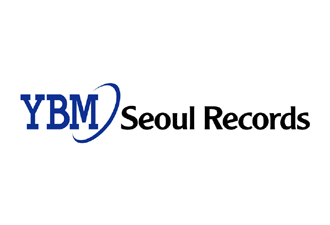
The company's logos as YBM Seoul Records (2000–2008)

The company's logos as LOEN Entertainment (2008–2018)

The company's logos as Kakao M (2018–2021)

=== Catalog numbers ===
As of 2015, Kakao M used two types of catalog number codes for its releases: the L10000**** series (later at the -5000 suffix) and the L20000**** series (later at the -1000 suffix).

== Controversies ==
=== Price fixing ===
2011
LOEN Entertainment, along with then-parent SK Telecom, was one of the 15 companies fined and sued by the Korean FTC for price rigging in 2011. The company was fined $9.6 million for its role in the scheme.

2016
On October 9, 2016, the Supreme Court of Korea handed out a 100 million won fine each to LOEN Entertainment and its closest competitor Genie Music (then known as KT Music) for colluding in price fixing, dating back to a case filed in 2008. Co-CEO Shin Won-soo, who was the sole CEO at the time being, was also sentenced to pay 10 million won.

=== Stealing royalties ===
On September 26, 2019, it was revealed that 3 former executives of the company have been charged with stealing 18.2 billion won in royalties from Melon, artists, and producers.

=== Incredible promotion conflict ===
In 2013, LOEN Entertainment made a deal with C-JeS Entertainment to promote and distribute Junsu's second studio album Incredible. Days before the album's release, C-Jes was reportedly notified by LOEN that they would distribute the album but had scrapped plans for promotional marketing and broadcasting Junsu's upcoming showcase on MelOn, although they would be able to broadcast it on LOEN TV. Promotional banners regarding the album's release on MelOn also disappeared from LOEN's social media accounts. C-JeS subsequently threatened to remove mentions of LOEN from Junsu's upcoming showcase and to file for a civil appeal to the Fair Trade Commission and Anti-Corruption and Civil Rights Commission.

In response, LOEN Entertainment stated that they were still in discussions regarding the album's promotion and that nothing had been confirmed prior to the relevant article's release. They pointed to the showcase event page on MelOn's homepage still being up as evidence that promotions were going ahead as planned. C-JeS responded saying that they had begun receiving pre-orders for the album and entries for the showcase event without a response from LOEN.

Following media attention, the two companies met on July 8 and resolved the dispute. Incredible was promoted and distributed by LOEN as planned.

== Business ==
Kakao M had three companies, a concept known as a "company in company" (CIC). The company also planned to set up another one in the future.

=== Melon Company ===
Melon Company (Korean: 멜론컴퍼니; RR: mellon keompeoni) was Kakao M's online music service company, operating Melon (short for melody on), the most popular music service in Korea, with 59% of all users in South Korea as of November 2013. That year Soompi ranked MelOn as the third most influential entity in the K-pop industry.

=== Music Content Company ===
The logos of LOEN Music and 1theK

Music Content Company (Korean: 음악컨텐츠컴퍼니; RR: eum-ak keontencheu keompeoni) was Kakao M's music content production company, which included the music content brand 1theK (which was known as LOEN Music before February 2014), the ticket selling portal Melon Ticket and distributed over 300 titles per year, working with independent agencies to invest in music production. The name '1theK' indicated its aim of creating one source for worldwide K-pop content.

==== Multilabel ====
Kakao M managed its artists within the companies under its Music Content Company, including LOEN Tree (2012) and Collabodadi (2014). Collabodadi artists were moved to LOEN Tree in September 2015 and later LOEN Tree was renamed as Fave Entertainment in February 2017.

Kakao M acquired independent label Starship Entertainment in 2013 and Cube Entertainment subsidiaries label A Cube Entertainment (which later was renamed Plan A Entertainment) in 2015, as well as King Kong Entertainment (which was acquired by Starship in 2015).

In June 2016, Kakao M established an independent label Mun Hwa In.

In December 2017, Kakao M established a one-person agency E&T Story Entertainment for actress Kim So-hyun, which was led by her long-time manager Park Chan-woo. As January 2018, Kakao M's independent label Plan A Entertainment has taken over the agency.

On June 27, 2018, Kakao M made strategic investments and created partnerships with three actor management agencies BH Entertainment, J.WIDE Company, Management SOOP, and Korea's leading advertisement model casting agency, Ready Entertainment in order to globalize its content.

On January 13, 2019, Kakao M acquired independent label Blossom Entertainment.

On February 13, 2019, Kakao M released a statement that Plan A Entertainment and Fave Entertainment will be merging into Play M Entertainment on April 1.

On January 6, 2020, Kakao M established a new label, EDAM Entertainment, to manage their long-time soloist IU.

=== Video Content Company ===
Video Content Company (Korean: 영상콘텐츠컴퍼니; RR: yeongsang keontencheu keompeoni) was Kakao M's media production company, which included Krispy Studio (a web content production company) and Mega Monster (formerly Story Plant, a drama production company that Kakao M co-owned with CJ E&M subsidiary Studio Dragon Corporation).

Just almost a week after its name change, Kakao M (through Krispy Studio) acquired a majority (65.7%) stake in Nylon Media Korea, publisher of the Korean edition of beauty and fashion magazine Nylon, from Seoul Cultural Publishers.

=== Others ===
In April 2018, Kakao M and its parent company formed the CSR venture Kakao Impact Foundation.

== Subsidiaries ==
As of 2021, the following companies were the subsidiaries of Kakao M:

- Antenna Entertainment (since 2021)
- Awesome ENT (since 2019)
- BH Entertainment (since 2018)
- Bluedot Entertainment (since 2021)
- E&T Story Entertainment (since 2019)
- EDAM Entertainment (since 2020)
- Flex M (since 2020)
- GRAYGO (Note: formerly Krispy Studio) (since 2017)
  - Maison de Baja (Note: Founded in 2014 by celebrity stylist Han Hye-yeon) (since 2019)
- High Up Entertainment (since 2021)
- J-Wide Company (since 2018)
- Management SOOP (since 2018)
- Mega Monster (Note: Formerly Story Plant; was affiliated under CJ E&M) (since 2017)
- Moonlight Film (since 2019)
- MTN Entertainment (since 2020)
- Ready Entertainment (since 2018)
- Sanai Pictures (since 2019)
- Starship Entertainment (since 2013)
  - Starship X (since 2013)
  - Highline Entertainment (Note: formerly House of Music) (since 2017)
  - King Kong by Starship (since 2015)
  - Shownote (since 2019)
- VAST Entertainment & Media (since 2015)

== Locations ==
- Jungseok Building, Teheran-ro 103-gil 17, Samseong-dong, Gangnam-gu, Seoul (Note: Main office, same with GRAYGO and EDAM Entertainment)
- Star Hill Building, Bongeunsa-ro 151, Nonhyeon-dong, Gangnam-gu, Seoul (Note: All subsidiaries under the Music Content Company excluding EDAM Entertainment and Flex M)
- 12/F Hibro Building, Teheran-ro 503, Samseong-dong, Gangnam-gu, Seoul (Note: Flex M)
- 20/F Sangam DMC Digital Cube, 34 Sangamsan-ro, Sangam-dong, Mapo-gu, Seoul (Note: Mega Monster)

== Awards ==
Name of the award ceremony, year presented, category, recipient of the award, and the result of the nomination
Award ceremony	Year	Category	Recipient	Result
Digital The Chosun Ilbo Awards	2011	Most Trusted Brand (Online Music Service)	MelOn	Won
App Awards Korea	2011	Best Entertainment Application	MelOn	Won
Digital The Chosun Ilbo Awards	2012	Most Trusted Brand (Online Music Service)	MelOn	Won
Korean Digital Business Innovation Awards	2012	Grand Prize (Digital Contents)	LOEN Entertainment	Won
Gaon Chart K-Pop Awards	2013	Music Distribution (Online)	LOEN Entertainment	Won

== See also ==
- Kakao
- MelOn Music Awards
- SK Group
