= Naul (singer) =

South Korean singer

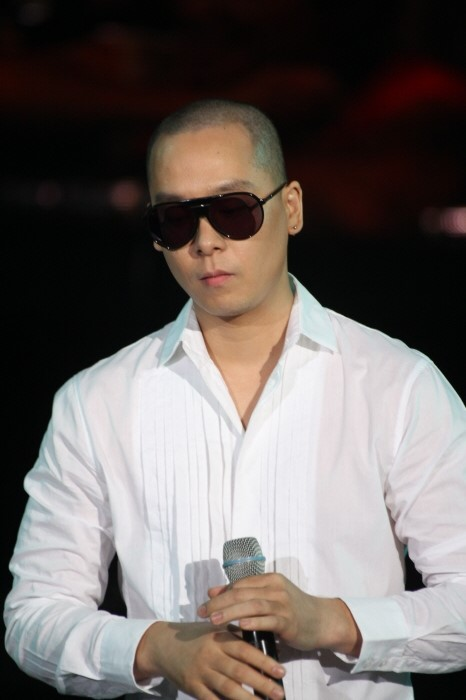
- Naul in 2014
- Born: Yoo Na-ul; September 23, 1978 (age 48); Uijeongbu, Gyeonggi-do, South Korea
- Occupation: Singer
- Musical career
- Genre: R&B
- Instrument: Vocals
- Years active: 1999–present
- Label: In Next Music

Korean name
- Hangul: 유나얼
- RR: Yu Naeol
- MR: Yu Naŏl

Yoo Na-ul (Korean: 유나얼; born September 23, 1978), better known by the mononym Naul (Hangul: 나얼), is a South Korean singer, artist, and member of Brown Eyed Soul, signed under in Next Music. He released his debut solo album, Back to the Soul Flight, on January 8, 2005. Naul has worked as a professor of music for Korea Nazarene University.

== Career ==
=== Before debut ===
During high school, Naul participated in an a cappella group with his friends and in 1996, the group progressed to the finals in a radio program contest called "A Starry Night".

=== Anthem (1999) ===
Naul made his debut with the four member R&B group Anthem. The group participated in SBS's New Era Music Competition in 1998, at which point they won the grand prize with the song "Letting You Go". The band released an album the following year, but did not gain much popularity.

=== Brown Eyes (2001–2003, 2008) ===
In 2001 Naul paired with Yoon Gun for the duo Brown Eyes. Naul provided main vocals and the cover art for their albums, while Yoon Gun provided backup vocals and composed and produced the music. They were well received and sold well. The duo disbanded in 2003 after releasing two albums, but reunited in 2008 for a third album.

=== Brown Eyed Soul (2003–present) ===
Having a period of hiatus after 2nd album of 'Brown Eyes', Naul organized a band called 'Brown Eyed Soul' with three more people (Jungyub, Yongjun, Sung Hoon).

=== Solo ===
Naul has released several solo albums, the second of which was predominantly composed of song covers. In September 2012 he released Principle of My Soul, which contained original songs. The single "Memories of Wind" charted as number one. On March 28, 2018, his 2nd full album, Sound Doctrine, was released.

== Artistry ==
Naul took classes on art and design in college. He has painted the artwork for some of his albums and some of his work has been curated in a charity exhibition.

== Discography ==
=== Studio albums ===
Title	Album details	Peak chart positions	Sales
Title	Album details	KOR	Sales
Back to the Soul Flight	Released: January 8, 2005; Label: CJ E&M; Formats: CD, digital download	12	KOR: 1,668+
Principle of My Soul	Released: September 20, 2012; Label: In Next Music, CJ E&M; Formats: CD, digital download	2	KOR: 49,236+
Sound Doctrine	Released: March 28, 2018; Label: In Next Music, CJ E&M; Formats: CD, digital download	10	KOR: 6,807+

=== Single albums ===
Title	Album details	Peak chart positions	Sales
Title	Album details	KOR	Sales
Emptiness in Memory (기억의 빈자리)	Released: November 29, 2017; Label: In Next Music, CJ E&M; Formats: CD, digital download	15	KOR: 2,996
Gloria	Released: December 22, 2017; Label: In Next Music, CJ E&M; Formats: CD, digital download	7	KOR: 4,995
Baby Funk	Released: February 8, 2018; Label: In Next Music, CJ E&M; Formats: CD, digital download	7	KOR: 4,961

=== Singles ===
Title	Year	Peak chart positions	Sales (DL)	Album
Title	Year	KOR	Sales (DL)	Album
"One's Way Home" (귀로)	2005	—N/a	—N/a	Back to the Soul Flight
"O Perfect Love"	2011	—	—N/a	I Am Melody, Vol. 1
"Be Not Dismayed Whatever Betide"	2011	—	—N/a	I Am Melody, Vol. 2
"Memory of the Wind" (바람기억)	2012	1	KOR: 3,303,768	Principle of My Soul
"Living in the Same Time" (같은 시간 속의 너)	2015	1	KOR: 1,510,162	Brown Eyed Soul Single Project
"I Surrender All"	2015	—	—N/a	I Am Melody, Vol. 3
"Emptiness in Memory" (기억의 빈자리)	2017	1	KOR: 500,096	Emptiness in Memory
"Gloria"	2017	80	KOR: 22,219	Sound Doctrine
"Baby Funk"	2018	—	—N/a	Sound Doctrine
"Feel Like"	2018	84	—N/a	Sound Doctrine
"For Each Other's Sake"	2020	33	—N/a	Non-album single
"I Still Love You" (서로를 위한 것)	2023	188	—N/a	Soul Pop City
"Dayspring" (걸음을 멈추는 날)	2023	65	—N/a	Naul <Ballad Pop City>
"Word"	2023	—	—N/a	Non-album singles
"Even for a Moment" (잠시라도 우리) (with Sung Si-kyung)	2023	13		Non-album singles
"—" denotes releases that did not chart.

=== Music videos ===
Year	Title	Album	Director
2012	"Memory of the Wind" (바람기억)	Principle of My Soul	APRILSHOWER FILM
2015	"Living in the Same Time" (같은 시간 속의 너)	Brown Eyed Soul Single Project	APRILSHOWER FILM
2017	"Emptiness in Memory" (기억의 빈자리)	Sound Doctrine	APRILSHOWER FILM
2017	"Gloria"	Sound Doctrine	APRILSHOWER FILM
2018	"Baby Funk"	Sound Doctrine	APRILSHOWER FILM
2018	"널 부르는 밤"	Sound Doctrine	APRILSHOWER FILM
