= Uncommitted (song) =

Single by XIA
- Language: English
- Released: 17 August 2012
- Recorded: 2012
- Genre: Pop; R&B
- Length: 15:46
- Label: C-JeS
- Songwriters: Bruce 'Automatic' Vanderveer; XIA
- Producers: Bruce 'Automatic' Vanderveer; XIA

XIA singles chronology
"'Tarantallegra'" (2012)	"Uncommitted" (2012)	"'Thank U For'" (2012)

Music video
- "Uncommitted" on YouTube

Uncommitted is a song recorded by South Korean singer XIA. It's marketed as "Single album", consists of lead single "Uncommitted" and an oriental version of the lead single of his first Korean studio album Tarantallegra, with all single sung in English.

The music video for "Uncommitted" was directed by Marc Klasfeld, featuring actress/model Stefanie Uncles and was shot in Los Angeles.

The single peaked at number 1 on South Korea's Gaon albums chart and 'Uncommitted" peaked at number 38 on the digital songs chart.

== Composition ==
The R&B track "Uncommitted" was composed by Bruce 'Automatic' Vanderveer. The oriental version of "Tarantallegra" added some Korean touch to the original song by using the traditional Korean instrument called kkwaenggwari and Xia also sang in Korean style towards the end of the song.

== Track listing ==
No.	Title	Lyrics	Music	Length
1.	"Uncommitted"	Bruce 'Automatic' Vanderveer	Bruce 'Automatic' Vanderveer	3:39
2.	"Tarantallegra (Oriental Ver.) [Ft. Flowsik]"	Juno	XIA	4:14
3.	"Uncommitted" (Inst.)		Bruce 'Automatic' Vanderveer	3:39
4.	"Tarantallegra (Oriental Ver.) [Ft. Flowsik Of Aziatix]" (Inst.)		XIA	4:14

== Charts ==
Chart	Peak position
South Korea Gaon Weekly Album Chart	1
South Korea Gaon Monthly Album Chart	3
South Korea Gaon Weekly Digital Chart	38
