= Kim Junsu =

South Korean singer (born 1986)

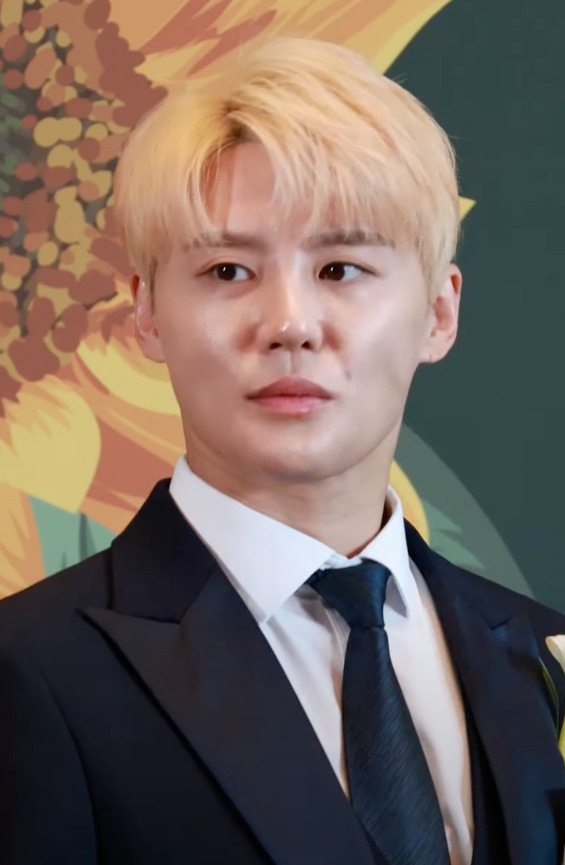
- Kim in 2024
- Born: Kim Jun-su; December 15, 1986 (age 39) (Note: Kim Jun-su was born on December 15, 1986, while his registered birth date is January 1, 1987.); Gyeonggi Province, South Korea
- Other name: Xiah Junsu
- Education: Myongji University
- Occupations: Singer; musical actor; songwriter
- Musical career
- Genres: K-pop; R&B; Dance-pop; K-Ballad; Alt-pop
- Instruments: Vocals; piano
- Years active: 2003–present
- Labels: SM; C-JeS; Palm Tree Island
- Member of: JX
- Formerly of: TVXQ; AnyBand; SM Town; JYJ

Korean name
- Hangul: 김준수
- Hanja: 金俊秀
- RR: Gim Junsu
- MR: Kim Chunsu

Stage name
- Hangul: 시아
- RR: Sia
- MR: Sia

Signature
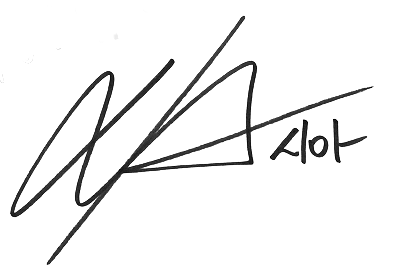

Kim Jun-su (Korean: 김준수; born December 15, 1986), known mononymously as Junsu or by the stage name XIA (/ʃiˈɑː/ SHEE-ah; 시아), is a South Korean singer-songwriter and musical actor. He is a former member of JYJ, and was one of the original members of TVXQ, during which time he was known by the stage name Xiah Junsu (시아준수).

Kim made his debut in 2003 as a member of TVXQ, a boy band produced and formed by South Korean record label and talent agency SM Entertainment, having previously been a trainee for six years. During his time in TVXQ, the group released four Korean albums, four Japanese albums, thirty Japanese singles and several Korean singles. In 2009, Kim and fellow TVXQ members Kim Jaejoong and Park Yoochun filed a lawsuit against SM Entertainment, arguing that their exclusive contracts were unilaterally disadvantageous towards the artists and should be invalidated. The Seoul Central District Court ruled in favor of the three and granted an injunction suspending their contracts. The trio reunited and subsequently formed JYJ in 2010. JYJ has since released one English album, two Korean albums, one Japanese EP, and one Korean EP.

Kim began his solo career in 2010 with the release of the Japanese EP Xiah, which peaked at number two on Japan's Oricon Singles Chart. Later that year, he made his musical debut in the role of Wolfgang in Mozart!, receiving critical acclaim and commercial success. In May 2012, he made his solo debut in South Korea with the studio album Tarantallegra and embarked on his first headlining world tour.

Despite limitations in media coverage and promotional activities caused by a ban in the Entertainment Departments of South Korea's three main terrestrial broadcasters resulting from SM Entertainment's interference, Kim's first and second studio albums reached the top two on South Korea's Gaon Album Chart, as well as reaching number-ten and number-five on the Billboard World Albums chart for Tarantallegra and Incredible, respectively. He is also known for being able to sell out tickets for his concerts and musicals within minutes, dubbed "the ticket power" by South Korean media. In November 2021, Kim formed his own agency, Palm Tree Island, with him as CEO.

== Early life and education ==
Kim was born and raised in Goyang, Gyeonggi Province, South Korea. He has a fraternal twin brother named Kim Junho, who is also a singer and actor.

He attended Neunggok Elementary School, Nunggok Middle School, Hwasu High School and then transferred to Hanam High School. In 2005, Kim enrolled in Myongji University, where he studied musical theater.

== Career ==
=== Pre-debut ===
At age eleven, Kim was signed by SM Entertainment after his participation in the agency's 6th Annual Starlight Casting System.

In 2002, SM Entertainment placed Junsu in a project R&B group with two other trainees, his childhood friend Eunhyuk and Sungmin. They appeared on a show called "2002 Survival Audition – Heejun vs. Kangta, Battle of the Century", along with three future members of rock band TRAX (Jay Kim, No Minwoo, Kang Jungwoo). They were judged and mentored by Moon Hee Jun and Kangta, two members of H.O.T, SM Entertainment's former group. Kangta praised Kim highly in the show, saying that he had potential as a lead vocalist. The group disbanded in 2003 (both Eunhyuk and Sungmin went on to debut as Super Junior's members two years later), when Kim was selected to be TVXQ's member.

=== 2003–2009: Debut and contract dispute ===
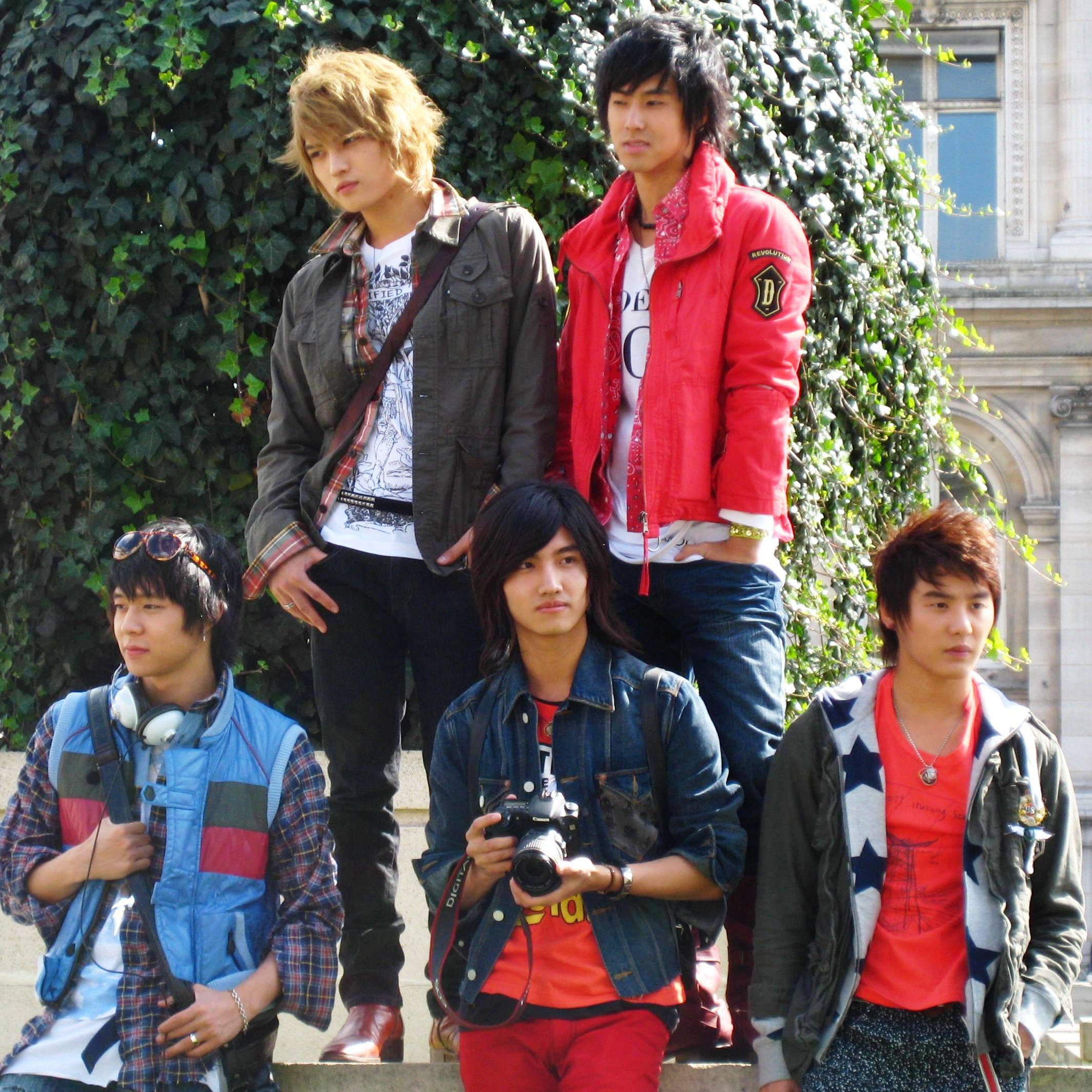
Xiah Junsu with DBSK in 2007 (on the right)

Kim was the first member to join TVXQ and officially debuted with the group on December 26, 2003. He chose Xiah to be his stage name, explaining that the name was short for "Asia" (taking out the "a" in "Asia"). "Xiah" would be an implication of his desire to become not only a star in Korea, but also a star recognized all throughout Asia.

In 2006, Kim featured in former label-mate Zhang Liyin's debut song, "Timeless". It is a remake of Kelly Clarkson and Justin Guarini's duet, originally recorded in 2003. He also made an appearance in the second part of "Timeless"' music video. In 2007, he was chosen to be part of Samsung's Anycall project group, Anyband. The band comprises former label-mate female singer BoA, Tablo of South Korean hip-hop group Epik High and jazz pianist Jin Bora. Anyband has only released one single of the same name.

On July 31, 2009, Kim and other two TVXQ members—Jaejoong and Yoochun—submitted an application to the Seoul Central District Court to determine the validity of their contract with SM Entertainment. Through their lawyers, the members stated that the 13-year contract was excessively long, schedules were held out without the confirmation or permission of the members, contract terms had been extended and changed without their knowledge or consent and that the group's earnings were not fairly distributed to the members. The Seoul Central District Court granted the three members a temporary contract injunction in October 2009 and ruled that SM cannot interfere with their individual activities but also that they can only act as members of TVXQ through SM Entertainment.

Throughout his career as TVXQ's member, Kim had written and composed several songs that appeared on the group's Korean and Japanese releases. His first composition was a ballad titled "Nae Gyeote Sumsuil Su Ittdamyeon (White Lie)" (네 곁에 숨쉴 수 있다면), included in TVXQ's third Korean studio album, "O"-Jung.Ban.Hap. At TVXQ's second Asian tour, he performed a solo self-composed dance track called "My Page". He also composed his solo slow-ballad "Rainy Night" of TVXQ's nineteenth Japanese single, If.../Rainy Night, an installment of the group's non-album release "TRICK" project. For TVXQ's Korean comeback in 2008, he wrote "Noeur... Baraboda (Picture of You)" (노을 ... 바라보다), which was featured in TVXQ's fourth Korean album. During TVXQ's third Asian tour, he performed another self-composed song "Xiahtic", which was then rearranged and performed in Japanese for his solo performance at the Tohoshinki 4th Live Tour 2009: The Secret Code in Tokyo Dome. The rearranged version of "Xiahtic" was also included in TVXQ's twenty-ninth Japanese single. He has also appeared on two televised shows with TVXQ, Banjun Theater and Vacation.

=== 2010–2011: Musical's debut, Japan's solo debut and JYJ ===
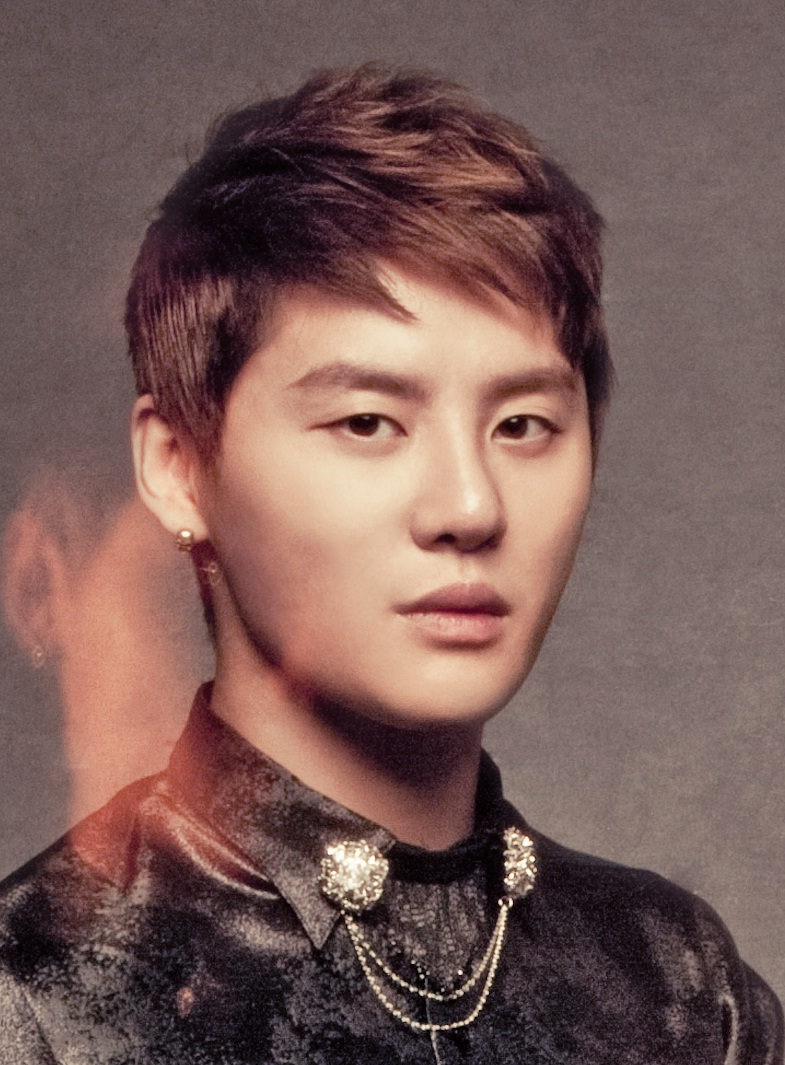
Junsu in 2012

At the beginning of 2010, Kim starred in the South Korean production of Austrian musical Mozart!, playing the lead role Wolfgang. His stage actor debut was met with great response, as the tickets for each one of his shows were completely sold out and he was able to sweep up all Best Newcomer awards in various awards ceremonies.

In April, 2010, the three-member group JYJ (initially known as Junsu/Jaejoong/Yoochun) was created, following an announcement made by Avex Trax, the trio's Japanese label at that time. After Avex revealed that TVXQ would go on an indefinite hiatus, it's decided that Kim would make his solo singing debut in Japan. A teaser showing his self-composed song "Intoxication" was made public and announced as the lead track of his upcoming single. The self-produced double A-side single (Refer Xiah) was released on May 26 and debuted at number two on Japan's Oricon chart. Two songs in the single, "Kanashimi no Yukue" (悲しみのゆくえ, The Whereabouts of Sadness) and "君がいれば ～Beautiful Love～" were used as the theme song for BeeTV's 5nen Atono Love Letter (５年後のラブレター, A Love Letter 5 Years From Now) and <Beautiful Love ～君がいれば～>.

In September, JYJ released The..., their first Japanese EP, which debuted at number one on the Oricon chart. However, Avex had announced the suspension of the group's activities in Japan, including Kim's, the same month that year. JYJ proceeded to release The Beginning, a global album which was sung in English. Kim promoted the new album with JYJ via a worldwide showcase tour with dates in South Korea, Southeast Asia and the United States.

In October, Kim was set to collaborate with Hungarian composer Sylvester Levay for a concert titled "Kim Junsu Musical Concert, Levay with Friends". It was held in Seoul at the Olympic Gymnastics Arena from the 7th until the 10th for a total of 4 days. Well-known German musical actor Uwe Kröger who worked with Levay in several musicals visited South Korea to participate in the concert as a special guest. During the show, Kim introduced "Miss You So", a song that was written especially for him by Levay, to the fans. He also performed "Intoxication" before Korean audience for the first time outside Japan.

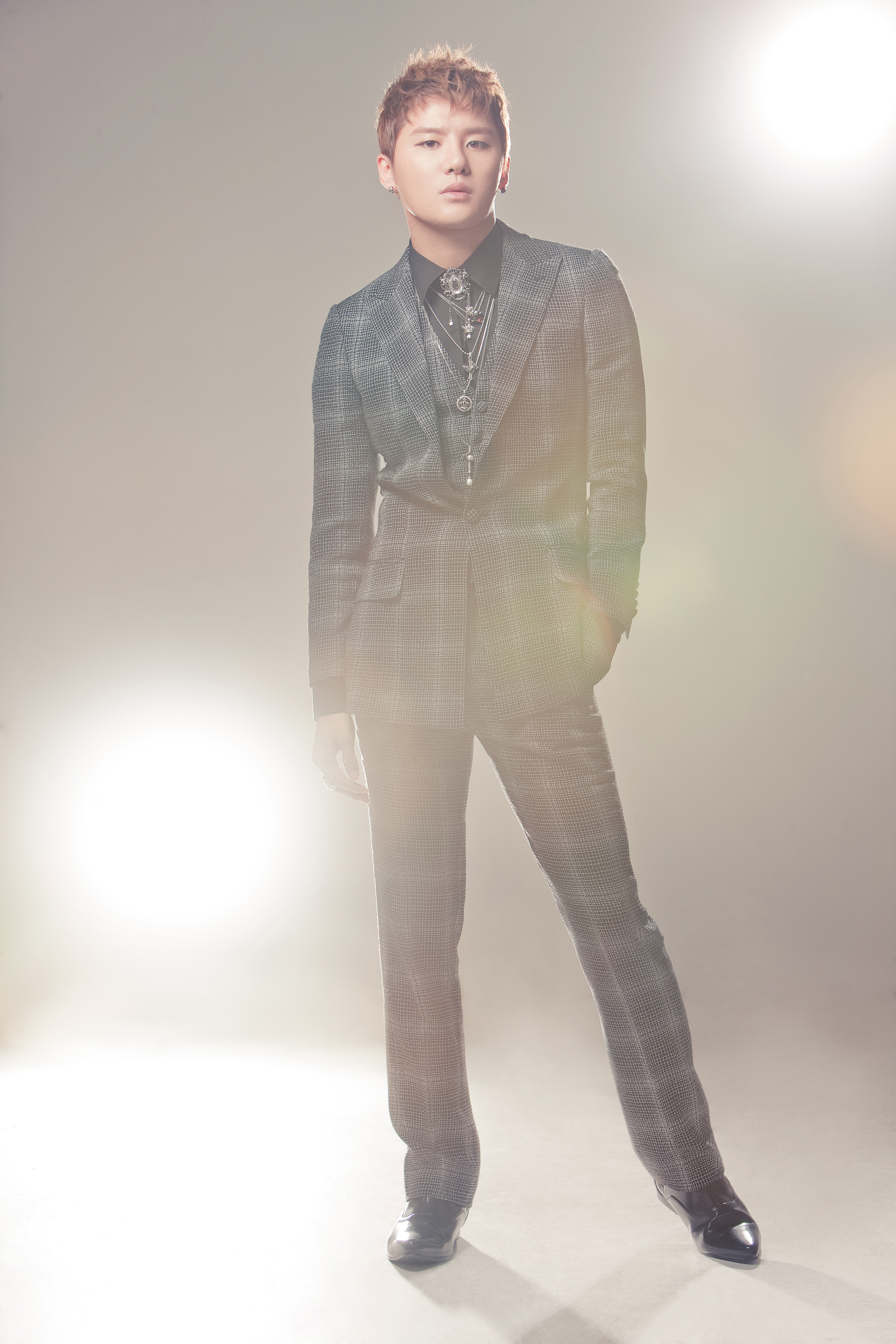
Junsu in 2011

In January 2011, JYJ released their EP, Their Rooms "Our Story", which Kim contributed in writing and composing two songs in the album, an up-tempo track titled "Mission" and a ballad titled "Fallen Leaves". The next month, he starred in his second musical, "Tears of Heaven". Kim played Jun-Hyung, a Korean soldier who fell in love with a Vietnamese singer during the Vietnam war.

In May 2011, Kim was appointed the honorary ambassador for the 5th The Musical Awards, along with musical actress Jo Jung Eun. He's also nominated for "Best Actor" and later won the "Popular Star Award" at the same award ceremony. In August, Kim released a song for Korean drama Scent of A Woman's OST, "You Are So Beautiful". The song managed to top real-time music charts shortly after it was released. He also made a cameo appearance in the drama as a popular singer that the main character idolizes and looks up to. In September, JYJ released their first Korean full-length album, In Heaven. Kim and actress Song Ji-hyo featured in the six minutes long music video for the album's lead track, "In Heaven". A 10-minutes version was released later on, revealing the complete story line. In November, Kim won the "Popular Star Award" at the 17th Korea Musical Awards alongside "Tears of Heaven" co-star Yoon Gong Joo. In December, he and South Korean actor Jang Geun-Suk received a K-POP Superstar Award at the "2011 Asia Jewelry Awards" held in Seoul.

=== 2012–2017: Domestic's solo debut and continuing musical career ===
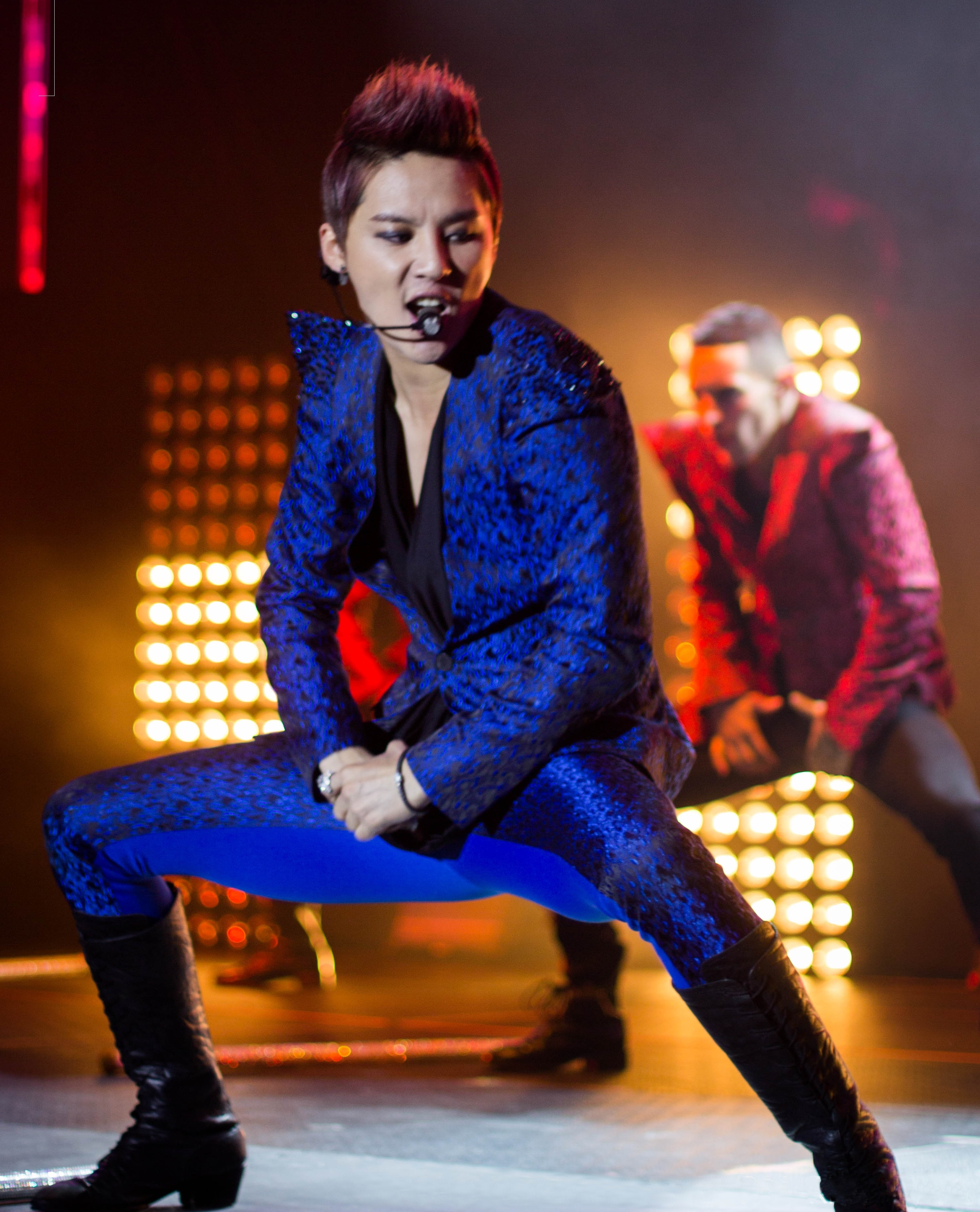
Junsu on stage in Hollywood Palladium, Los Angeles in 2012

Kim released his first Korean full-length solo album, Tarantallegra, in May 2012. It was his first solo music release in two years, after the suspension of his solo activities in 2010. To promote the album, he held concert tour kick off in Seoul on May 19 and 20 and continued to Thailand, Indonesia, Taiwan, China and Hong Kong. C-Jes later announced that the tour would extension to World Tour which plans to held two until three cities per continents of the North American, South American and European. C-JeS also confirmed that Kim's preparing repackage album with English song to targeting global market. His English single, "Uncommitted" was released. The song is written by Bruce 'Automatic' Vanderveer and also including a new version of song "Tarantallegra".

In October 2012, Kim won his first "Best Actor" award at the 18th Korea Musical Awards for his performance as the transcendental existence Der Tod or The Death, a lead role in the Elisabeth, his third musical. He had also received third consecutive "Popular Star Award" at the annual The Musical Awards in June. On Christmas Eve, Kim released a digital single, Thank U For, before holding an all-live concert entitled "2012 XIA Ballad & Musical Concert with Orchestra" on the 29th. The concert featured ballads from his album as well as OST songs and a few pieces from his previous musicals, accompanied by an orchestra during the whole show. By the end of 2012, Kim has sold almost 200,000 copies of Tarantallegra and Uncommitted combined, becoming one of the year's highest selling solo artists on South Korea's record chart Gaon.

In November 2012, the three years and four months lawsuit concluded as SM Entertainment and JYJ reached a mutual agreement to terminate all contracts between the two parties and not to interfere with each other's activities in the future. At a voluntary arbitration at the Seoul Central District Court, SM Entertainment finally agreed that its contract ended July 31, 2009, and that it would no longer interfere with JYJ's endeavors in Korea.

On February 25, 2013, Kim (as JYJ) was invited to perform at South Korea's current president Park Geun-hye's inauguration ceremony held at the National Assembly Building's Center Plaza, in front of more than 70,000 people. Two months later, Kim took the stage for JYJ's three days concert, "The Return of JYJ", held at the Tokyo Dome. The sold-out concert marks the first time JYJ had been able to perform in Japan after the contract with their former Japanese management agency Avex ended in 2010.

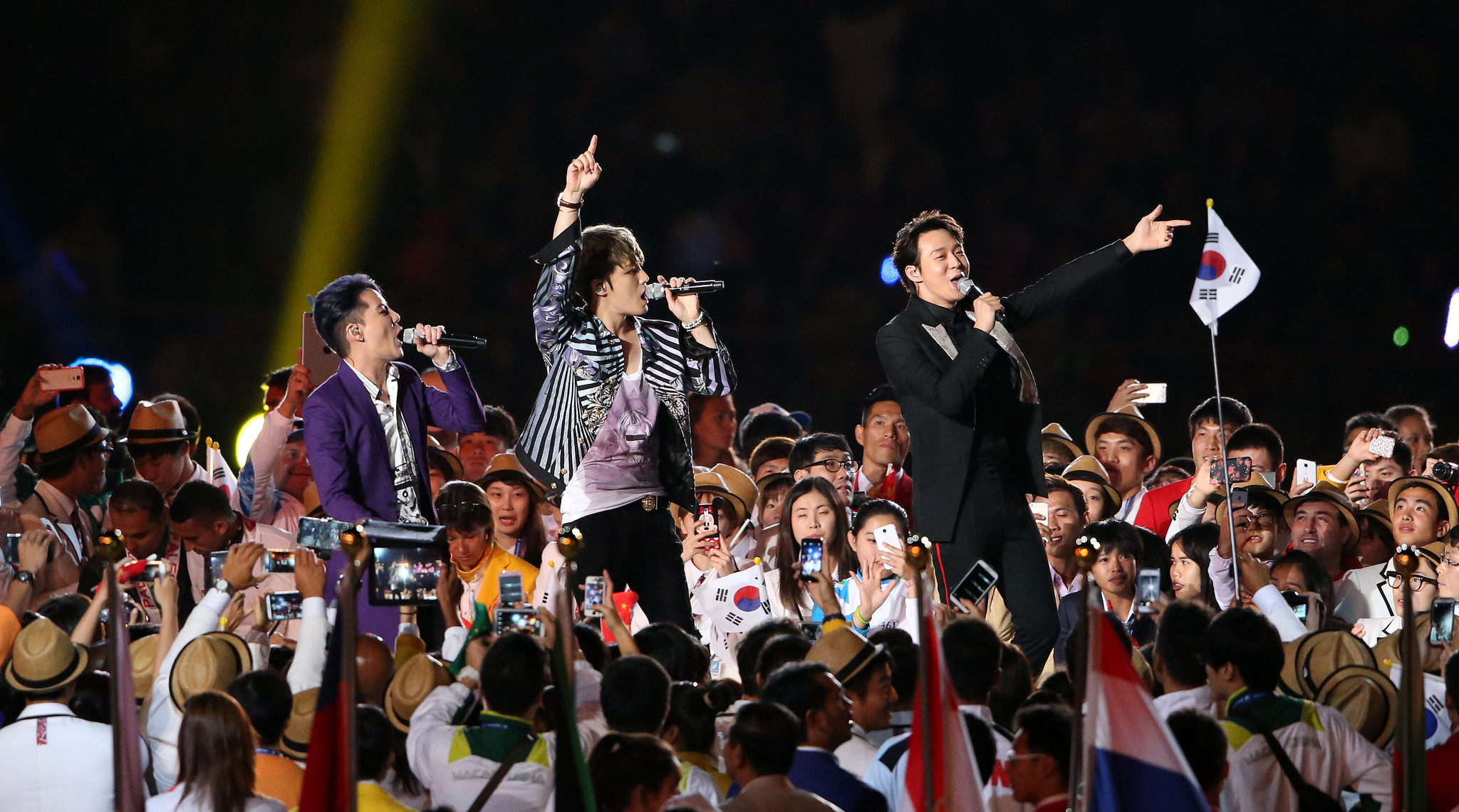
JYJ in 2014 Asian Games opening ceremony

Incredible, Kim's second Korean studio album, was released in July 2013. Its lead track, "Incredible", was made by Bruce 'Automatic' Vanderveer, who he collaborated with on his first English single. Prior to the album release, the pre-release single "11AM" was released. On the 15th, he held a solo showcase at UNIQLO AX Hall in Seoul to commemorate the official release of Incredible. His second headlining concert tour began the following week with its first stop in Bangkok, Thailand.

Junsu later held a solo tour in Japan, called the "2014 XIA The Best Ballad Spring Tour Concert in Japan," starting in Tokyo on May 13–15 and then heading to Osaka on May 22–24. The poster for the concert was released early April.

On March 3, 2015, Kim's third studio album Flower was released. The album debuted at number 1 on the Gaon and Oricon charts. The title song Flower features Tablo from Epik High, with Dok2 and Naul (Brown Eyed Soul) also featuring on the album. On the same day of the album release Kim launched 2015 Xia Third Asia Tour Concert – Flower with the first stop being Osaka.

In April 2015 Kim was confirmed to act in the Korean version of the musical Death Note. Kim played the role of L.

Kim announced that he would be returning with an extended play and released the title song Yesterday on October 19, 2015. Rapper Giriboy features on track "Oeo" while Cheetah is a feature on "Midnight Show".

Kim featured on rapper Psy's seventh album Psyder, with the song "Dream".

Kim placed 1st place in the ballot of the Domestic Popularity Award carried out by the '25th High1 Seoul Music Awards' from November 27, 2015, to January 12, 2016. XIA won a total of 46.7% of votes in the ballot for the Popularity Award domestically chosen 100% by voting results beforehand, and recorded 1st place.

In May 2016, his fourth studio album, Xignature was released, featuring The Quiett, Automatic, Crucial Star and Paloalto. Later he played the lead role in two musicals, Dracula and Dorian Gray.

At the beginning of 2017, Kim again took up the role of L in the Death Note musical, before he enlisted in the army as a conscripted policeman.

=== 2018–2020: Discharge from military and Pit a Pat ===
Kim was discharged from military service on November 5, 2018, and started promotions with a fansigning event at COEX Live Plaza. He held a 3-day concert Way Back Xia at Jamsil Indoor Stadium. After his discharge, Kim returned to the stage to his role of Death in the musical Elizabeth.

Kim was announced to star in the musical Xcalibur as King Arthur from June 15 to August 4, 2019, at the Sejong Center for the Performing Arts, Seoul. On November 19, Kim unexpectedly released his winter single "When It Snows". On December 29, Kim held year-end concert titled 2019 XIA Ballad&Musical Concert with Orchestra Vol.6 at Seoul's COEX D Hall. He also performance his winter single "When It Snows" for the first time.

On October 26, 2020, C-Jes announced that Kim would release his second extended play Pit a Pat On November 10. The online concert also announced to held on November 21 and 22. His second extended play was released with four tracks, including the lead single of the same name and also his single "When It Snows".

=== 2021–2023: Palm Tree Island, Dimension ===
On November 9, 2021, C-JeS Entertainment's contract with Kim expired and he decided not to renew. Later, it was reported that Kim founded Palm Tree Island Agency, a single agency.

On February 21, 2022, Kim was announced to release his third extended play Dimension and scheduled to held solo concert titled Kim Junsu 2022 Concert 'Dimension', on March 18 to 20 at the Kintex 1 Exhibition Hall 1 in Seoul, to commemorate the EP release. On March 10, it was announced that Kim's upcoming concert also available on online streaming platform. The EP officially released on March 16, with four tracks including the lead single "Hana".

On June 25, 2022, Kim continue to held Kim Junsu 2022 Concert 'Dimension' at Thunder Dome in Bangkok, Thailand. The concert also held in Japan from July 8 to 10 at Tokyo Garden Theater.

In November 2022, Kim announced would held year-end concert titled 2022 XIA Ballad & Musical Concert with Orchestra Vol.8 on December 23 to 25 at COEX Hall D.

On July 6, 2023, Palm Tree Island announced that Kim would held a fanmeeting Cocotime in August embarked in Seoul, Yokohama, Osaka and Nagoya, to commemorate his 20th anniversary debut. For his 20th anniversary debut, Kim also released digital single "Red Diamond" on August 22, which contains Korean and Japan language.

In November 2023, it was announced that Kim would released Christmas song, My Christmas Wish in December 2023 alongside his Palmtree Island artist roster. The song was written by Broadway composer Frank Wildhorn, with lyrics by Tracy Miller and Carly Robyn Green.

=== 2024–present: Formation of JX ===
On June 12, 2024, Kim released the digital single "Our Season", a "semi-rock ballad" that contains a message of support and consolation for imperfect youth.

On September 6, 2024, Kim and Jaejoong released a teaser for their collaborative project JX. The duo held concerts to celebrate the 20th anniversary of their debut as singers at the KSPO Dome from November 8–10, 2024.

On June 2, 2026, Kim released his first solo album in ten years. The 10-track album is entitled, Gravity. The new music also brings an Asian concert tour of the same name.

== Personal life ==
=== Military service ===
Kim began his 21-month mandatory military service on February 9, 2017. He was discharged on November 5, 2018.

== Discography ==
- Tarantallegra (2012)
- Incredible (2013)
- Flower (2015)
- Xignature (2016)
- Gravity (2026)

== Concerts and tours ==
=== Headlining ===
==== World tours ====
- Tarantallegra (2012)

==== Asia tours ====
- Incredible (2013)
- Flower (2015)
- Yesterday (2015)
- Xignature (2016)
- Way Back Xia (2018-2019)
- Gravity (2026)

==== Special concerts ====
- 2012 XIA Ballad & Musical Concert with Orchestra vol.1
- 2013 XIA Ballad & Musical Concert with Orchestra vol.2
- 2014 XIA The Best Ballad Spring Tour Concert in Japan
- 2014 XIA Ballad & Musical Concert with Orchestra vol.3
- 2015 XIA Ballad & Musical Concert with Orchestra vol.4
- 2016 XIA The Best Ballad Spring Tour Concert in Japan vol.2
- 2016 XIA Ballad & Musical Concert with Orchestra vol.5
- 2019 XIA Ballad & Musical Concert with Orchestra vol.6
- 2020 XIA Pit A Pat Online concert
- 2020 XIA Ballad & Musical Online concert with orchestra
- 2022 XIA Ballad & Musical Concert with Orchestra vol.8
- XIA 2023 Concert Chapter 1: Recreation
- XIA 2025 CONCERT Chapter 2: Festa

== Filmography ==
=== Television shows ===
| Year | Title | Role | Notes | Ref. |
|---|---|---|---|---|
| 2019 | Mister Trot | judge | | |
| 2020 | Miss Trot 2 | judge | | |
| 2021 | Tomorrow's National Singer | judge | | |
| 2021 | Guide map K-Road | Cast Member | | |
| 2022 | Nowadays Men's Life Groom Class | Cast Member | | |
| 2022 | Seven stars | Mentor | Thai audition program | |
| 2022 | Burning Trotman | Judge | | |

== Musicals ==
| Year | Title | Role | Notes |
|---|---|---|---|
| 2010 | Mozart! | Wolfgang Mozart | |
| 2011 | Tears of Heaven | Junhyung | The musical production derived from singer Jo Sungmo's music video for the song "Do You Know" (2000). |
| 2011 | Mozart! | Wolfgang Mozart | |
| 2012–2013 | Elisabeth | Tod (Death) | Had his 1st performance on February 8 and finished his first run on May 2, 2012.; Returned as Tod from August 14 – September 4, 2013, for the musical's second run. |
| 2013 | December | Jiwook | A jukebox musical built around the music of the late South Korean folk rock singer Kim Kwang-seok. |
| 2014 | Dracula | Count Dracula | |
| 2015 | Death Note | L Lawliet | |
| 2016 | Dracula | Count Dracula | The second run |
| 2016 | Dorian Gray | Dorian Gray | |
| 2017 | Death Note | L Lawliet | The second run (Last musical before military enlistment) |
| 2018–2019 | Elisabeth | Tod (Death) | |
| 2019 | Xcalibur | King Arthur | |
| 2020 | Dracula | Count Dracula | The third run |
| 2020 | Mozart! | Wolfgang Mozart | The third run |
| 2021 | Dracula | Count Dracula | The fourth run |
| 2021 | Xcalibur | King Arthur | The second run |
| 2022 | Xcalibur | King Arthur | The third run |
| 2022 | Death Note | L Lawliet | 2023 |
| 2022 | Elisabeth das Musical | Death | |
| 2022 | West Side Story | Tony | |
| 2023 | Death Note | L Lawliet | |
| 2023 | Dracula | Count Dracula | * The fifth run |
| 2024 | Dracula | Count Dracula | * The fifth run |
| 2024 | Aladdin | Aladdin | |
| 2025 | Aladdin | Aladdin | |

== Awards and nominations ==
Year presented, name of the award ceremony, award category, nominated work and the result of the nomination
| Year | Awards | Category | Nominated work | Result | Ref. |
|---|---|---|---|---|---|
| 2010 | 4th The Musical Awards | Best New Actor | Mozart! | Won | |
| 2010 | 4th The Musical Awards | Most Popular Actor | Mozart! | Won | |
| 2010 | 16th Korea Musical Awards | Best New Actor | Mozart! | Won | |
| 2010 | 16th Korea Musical Awards | Most Popular Actor | Mozart! | Won | |
| 2010 | 2010 Interpark Golden Ticket Awards | Ticket Power Award – Musical Actor | Mozart! | Won | |
| 2011 | 5th The Musical Awards | Best Actor | Tears of Heaven | Nominated | |
| 2011 | 5th The Musical Awards | Most Popular Actor | Tears of Heaven | Won | |
| 2011 | 17th Korea Musical Awards | Most Popular Actor | Tears of Heaven | Won | |
| 2011 | 3rd Asia Jewelry Awards | World K-POP Superstar Award | | Won | |
| 2011 | 7th Interpark Golden Ticket Awards | Ticket Power Award – Musical Actor | Mozart! & Tears of Heaven | Nominated | |
| 2012 | 6th The Musical Awards | Best Actor | Elisabeth | Nominated | |
| 2012 | 6th The Musical Awards | Most Popular Actor | Elisabeth | Won | |
| 2012 | 18th Korea Musical Awards | Best Actor | Elisabeth | Won | |
| 2012 | 18th Korea Musical Awards | Most Popular Actor | Elisabeth | Won | |
| 2012 | 8th Interpark Golden Ticket Awards | Ticket Power Award – Musical Actor | Elisabeth | Won | |
| 2012 | 8th Interpark Golden Ticket Awards | Ticket Power Award – Local Concert Musician | XIA 1st Asia Tour Concert in Seoul & 2012 XIA Ballad & Musical Concert with Orchestra | Won | |
| 2012 | 8th Interpark Golden Ticket Awards | Popularity Award | XIA 1st Asia Tour Concert in Seoul & 2012 XIA Ballad & Musical Concert with Orchestra | Won | |
| 2012 | 2012 SFCC Awards (The Seoul Foreign Correspondents' Club Awards) | Raising Awareness of Korea Overseas – Singer | Tarantallegra & XIA 1st World Tour Concert | Won | |
| 2013 | 1st Yin Yue Tai V Chart Awards | Best Korean Male Artist | "Uncommitted" | Won | |
| 2013 | 19th Korea Musical Awards | Most Popular Star | Elisabeth | Won | |
| 2013 | 9th Interpark Golden Ticket Awards | Ticket Power Award – Local Concert (Musician) | XIA 2nd Asia Tour Concert INCREDIBLE & 2013 XIA Ballad & Musical Concert with Orchestra | Nominated | |
| 2013 | 9th Interpark Golden Ticket Awards | Ticket Power Award – Musical Actor | Elisabeth & December | Nominated | |
| 2013 | 9th Interpark Golden Ticket Awards | Popularity Award | Elisabeth & December | Won | |
| 2015 | Seoul Music Awards | Popularity Award | Flower | Won | |
| 2016 | eDaily Culture Awards | Grand Prize | Death Note | Won | |
| 2019 | Newsis K-Expo | Hallyu Culture Daesang Award | Overall work in Musical and Kpop industries | Won | |
| 2019 | StageTalk Audience Choice Awards | Best Actor | Elisabeth | Won | |
| 2023 | 17th Interpark Golden Ticket Awards | Ticket Power Award – Musical Actor | Death Note | Nominated | |
| 2026 | 62nd Baeksang Arts Awards | Best Performer | Beetlejuice | Won | |
