= C-JeS Studios =

South Korean entertainment company

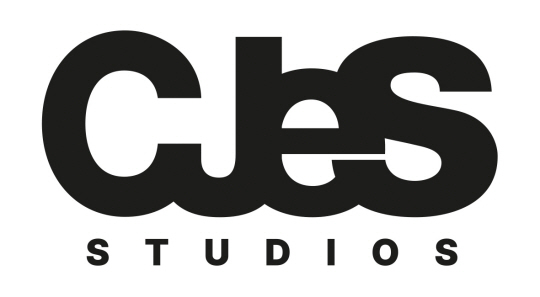
- Official new logo
- Native name: 씨제스 스튜디오스
- Type: Private
- Industry: Entertainment
- Genre: K-pop; R&B
- Founded: 21 December 2009; 16 years ago in Seoul, South Korea
- Founder: Baek Chang-ju
- Headquarters: 40-12, Teheran ro 38 gil, Gangnam-gu, Seoul, South Korea
- Number of locations: Seoul; Los Angeles
- Key people: Baek Chang-ju (founder, CEO)
- Products: Drama; Music
- Services: Artist Management
- Revenue: 32.6 billion won (2011)
- Number of employees: 40
- Subsidiaries: C-JeS Content Tree; C-JeS Culture; C-JeS Production
- Website: C-JeS.com

C-JeS Studios (formerly known as C-JeS Entertainment) is a South Korean entertainment company established in 2009 that handles the management of various artists.On April 3, 2023, the company changed its name from C-JeS Entertainment to "CJeS STUDIOS" and announced its aim to achieve significant growth following the rebranding.

== History ==
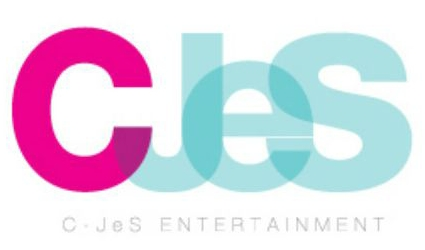
Logo of C-JeS used between 2009 and 2023.

The agency was established to meet the management needs of Jaejoong, Junsu and Yoochun, former members of TVXQ, after the trio filed a lawsuit against their former record label, S.M. Entertainment. The singers met entertainment industry veteran Baek Chang-ju in mid-2009, not long after they filed the lawsuit. C-JeS was established shortly after that. Baek has directly said in the interview that C-JeS was established solely because of JYJ. Baek invested heavily in building the newly created band, JYJ's image and credibility after the Korean entertainment industry closed its doors on the artists perceived as "rebels" for going against their previous management.

On 8 March 2013, actor Lee Jung-jae signed on to be exclusively managed by C-JeS Entertainment. He reportedly chose C-Jes after working with Song Ji-hyo in movie New World.

On 29 August 2014, C-JeS Entertainment signed actress-singer Hwang Jung-eum.

On 10 July 2015, Song Ji-hyo ended her contract with C-JeS Entertainment after 4 years.

On 28 April 2021, C-JeS Entertainment signed actor Lee Jae-wook.

On April 3, 2023, CEO Baek Chang-ju announced that C-JeS Entertainment changed its name to C-JeS Studio.

== Roster ==
=== Recording artists ===
==== Groups ====
- Noel
- WHIB

==== Soloists ====
- Crucial Star

=== Entertainer ===
- Kim Shin-young

=== Actors ===
- Chae Shi-ra
- Jo Sung-ha
- Moon So-ri
- Oh Dal-su
- Oh Ha-nee
- Park Byung-eun
- Park Sung-woong
- Ra Mi-ran
- Song Il-gook
- Sul Kyung-gu
- Uhm Ji-won
- Teo Yoo
- Shin Eun-jung
- Jung Suk-won
- Jung Yun-ha
- Kim Ye-eun
- Hong Seung-hee
- Ko Deok-won
- Jung Jung-ho

=== Production people ===
==== Directors ====
- Hur Jin-ho

== Former ==
=== Former artists ===
- JYJ (2010–2022) (Note: While no official disbandment or departure has been announced, the group's artist page was removed from the C-JeS website in 2022, signifying the group is no longer active under the label.)
  - Yoochun (2010–2019)
  - Junsu (2010–2021)
  - Kim Jae-joong (2010–2023)
- Gummy (2013–2024)
- Solji (2020–2024)

=== Former actors ===
- Choi Min-sik (2013–2021)
- Choi Ro-woon
- Ha Seok-jin (2019–2021)
- Han Ji-sang (2017–2024)
- Hong Jong-hyun (2018–2023)
- Hwang Jung-eum (2014–2023)
- Im Se-mi (2015–2018)
- Ji Il-joo (2020–2021)
- Jin Ji-hee (2019–2024)
- Jung In-sun (20??–2020)
- Kang Hye-jung (2013–2023)
- Kim Hye-eun
- Kim Junsu (2010–2021)
- Kim Kang-woo (2014–2017)
- Kim Nam-gil (2018–2020)
- Kim Sun-a (2015–2017)
- Kwak Do-won (2014–2018)
- Lee Beom-soo (2014–2015)
- Lee Bong-ryun (2017–2021)
- Lee Chung-ah (2015–2018)
- Lee Jung-jae (2013–2016)
- Lee Re (2012–2023)
- Lee Soo-kyung (2019–2021)
- Min Do-hee (2022–2023)
- Park Joo-mi (2014–2019)
- Park Yu-hwan (2011–2021)
- Ryu Hye-young (2014–2018)
- Ryu Jun-yeol (2015–2025)
- Shin Hyeon-seung (2021)
- Song Ji-hyo (2011–2015)
- Song Sae-byeok (20??–2018)
- Yoon Ji-hye (2014–2020)
- Yoon Sang-hyun
- Cha Ji-yeon
- Hwang Seung-eon
- Jin Hee-kyung
- Jin Hyuk
- Jung Seonah
- Kang Hong-seok
- Kim Myung-min
- Kim Yoo-ri
- Kwon Na-ra
- Lee Jae-wook
- Lee Joo-yeon
- Park Ye-young (2023–2025)
- Ryu Ui-hyun

== Productions ==
=== TV and web series ===
- Sungkyunkwan Scandal (KBS 2TV, 2010) (with RaemongRaein Co., Ltd.)
- Miss Ripley (MBC TV, 2011) (with Curtain Call Media)
- Three Days (SBS TV, 2014) (with Golden Thumb Pictures)
- Bubbly Lovely (SBS TV, 2016)
- Welcome to Waikiki (JTBC, 2018) (with Drama House)
- Switch (SBS TV, 2018)
- Mung Bean Flower (SBS TV, 2019)
- Welcome to Waikiki 2 (JTBC, 2019) (with JTBC Studios)
- Shady Mom-in-Law (SBS TV, 2019) (with SBS Plus)
- Lost (JTBC, 2021) (with Drama House)
- Hometown (tvN, 2021) (with Studio Dragon)
- Link: Eat, Love, Kill (tvN, 2022) (with Studio Dragon and Arc Media)
- Drama Stage: Find the 1st Prize (tvN, 2022) (with Studio Dragon)
- Big Bet (Disney+, 2022) (with B.A. Entertainment and Arc Media)
- Captivating the King (tvN, 2024)
- Night Photo Studio (ENA, 2024) (with Slingshot Studios)
- Mousetrap (Netflix, 2026) (with Kakao Entertainment, H House and Studio PIM)
- But Your Love (WT) (SBS TV, 2027) (with Studio S and MYM Entertainment)

=== Stage and musical ===
- Dracula, the Musical (2014) (with OD Musical Company)
- Death Note, the Musical (2015)
- A New Musical, Dorian Gray (2016)
- Death Note, the Musical (2017)
- Dracula, the Musical (2020)

=== Film ===
- The Night Owl (2022) (with Cinema DahmDahm, distributed by NEW)
- Citizen of a Kind (2024) (with Page One Film, distributed by Showbox)
