= Ilsan =

Planned city in Goyang, South Korea

Coordinates: 37°40′N 126°45′E

- Hangul: 일산신도시
- Hanja: 一山新都市
- RR: Ilsan sindosi
- MR: Ilsan sindosi

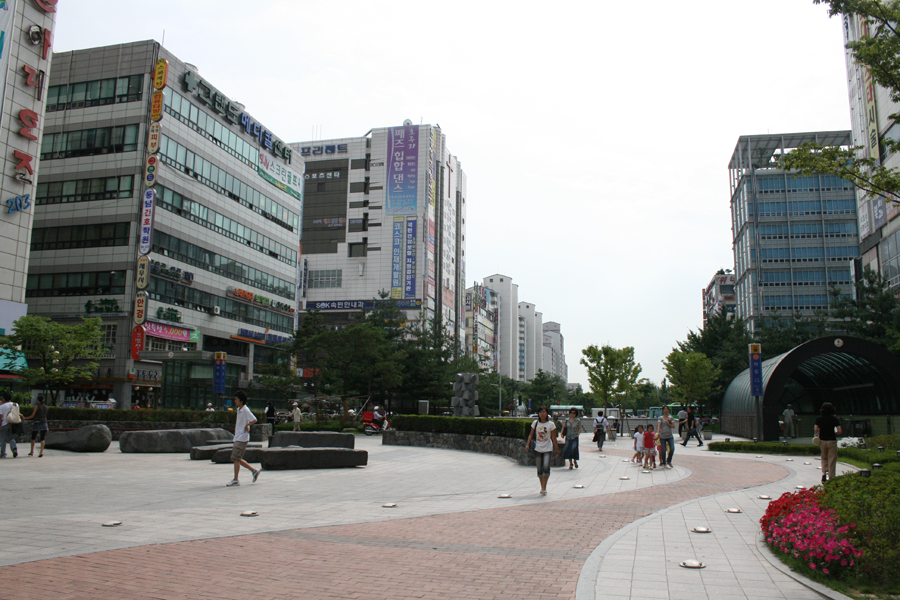
Ilsan

Ilsan New Town (Korean: 일산신도시) refers to a planned city occupying Ilsandong District and Ilsanseo District of Goyang.

Ilsan is located northwest of Seoul. Like other satellite cities in the Seoul National Capital Area such as Bundang, Ilsan was planned in order to alleviate housing shortages in the city of Seoul. Ilsan has experienced phenomenal growth since 1992, usually drawing in younger generations of upper-middle-class and upper-class Koreans.

Ilsan's total population (Ilsandong and Ilsanseo Districts combined) is 577,023 as of 2024.

Ilsan's total population (Ilsandong and Ilsanseo Districts combined) is 573,922 as of 2026.

"KINTEX (Korea International Exhibition Center) is undergoing its third stage of expansion. Upon completion, it is expected to become one of the top 20 exhibition centers globally in terms of total indoor exhibition space, further boosting Ilsan's MICE (Meetings, Incentives, Conferences, and Exhibitions) industry."

== Attractions ==
Ilsan is home to Lake Park (호수공원). The lake covers 72.9 acres (295,000 m^{2}) and is the largest artificial lake in Asia. Lake Park features a variety of wild flowers and plants, such as a cactus arboretum and botanical gardens, recreational facilities, a 4.7 km bike path, and a musical fountain. It is the venue for the annual Goyang Korea Flower Show.

The area surrounding Lake Park is a large and sprawling commercial district which host hundreds of stores, restaurants, entertainment venues, and nightlife. Baekseok Station is nearby.

Ilsan's dynamic culture and urban landscape are featured in numerous Korean TV shows. As a result, the production centers of MBC and SBS,EBS two of the three largest television networks in Korea, are located in Ilsan.

Jeongbalsan Park is located in the center of Ilsan. It is a large residential park which features a large hiking hill with trails, a large Buddhist temple, a historical thatched roof house, and an outdoor gymnasium.

Goyang Stadium is located near Daehwa Station. It includes a main stadium and a basketball gymnasium.

Goyang Aram Nuri Arts Center is between Lake Park and Jeongbal mountain. The theater has 1,887 seats. It is the only wind-pipe concert hall north of the Han River with more than 1,000 seats.

The Korean International Exhibition Center KINTEX is located in Ilsan. It hosts the annual Seoul Motor Show.

The National Cancer Center of Korea is in the Madu neighborhood.

"Ilsan is home to the CJ LiveCity project, which includes a world-class K-pop arena with a capacity of 20,000 seats. Along with existing facilities like the MBC Dream Center and SBS Ilsan Production Center, this development solidifies Ilsan's position as a major hub for the Hallyu (Korean Wave) industry."

== Transportation ==
Ilsan is on GTX Line A, Line 3 and the Gyeongui Line of the Seoul Metropolitan Subway. It has local, inter-city, and transit (to Seoul) buses.

== Education ==
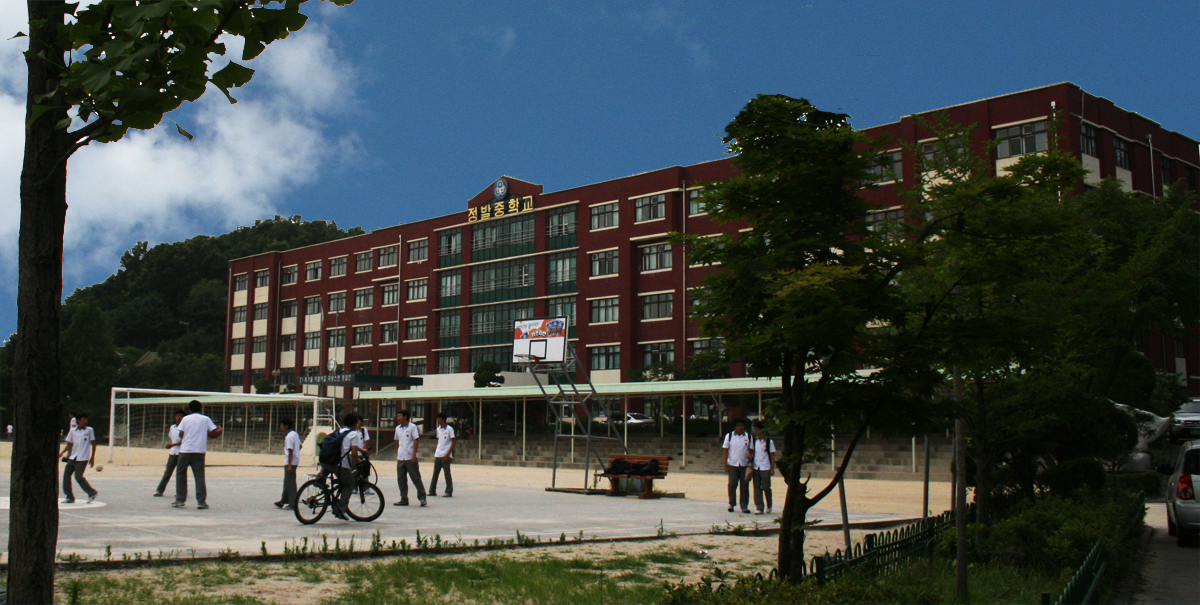
Jeongbal Middle School (정발중학교) in Ilsandong-gu

Numerous schools have been built in Ilsandong District and Ilsanseo District since the 1980s as the Ilsan New City (일산신도시) was being developed. Starting from 2002, the High School Equalization Policy (고교평준화제도) came into effect, which abolished the former high school admission policies based on the Yeonhabgosa (Unified Entrance Examination, 연합고사).

Ilsandong District has 33 schools including: 19 elementary schools, 6 middle schools, 7 high schools, and 1 special school.

Ilsanseo District has 46 schools including: 22 elementary schools, 12 middle schools, 9 high schools, and 2 special schools.

Jeongbalsan (정발산), Hugok (후곡) and Baengma (백마) are notable for their many academies (학원, "cram school").

== Photos ==
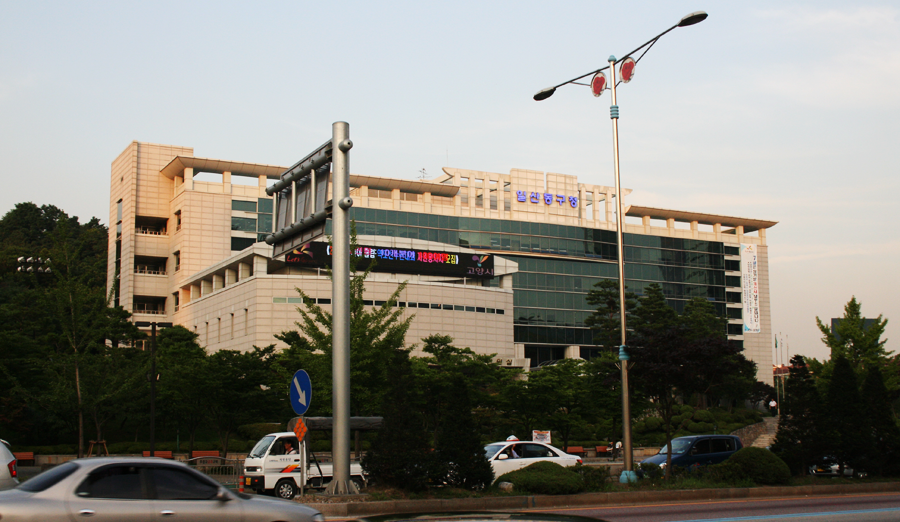
Ilsandong-gu office

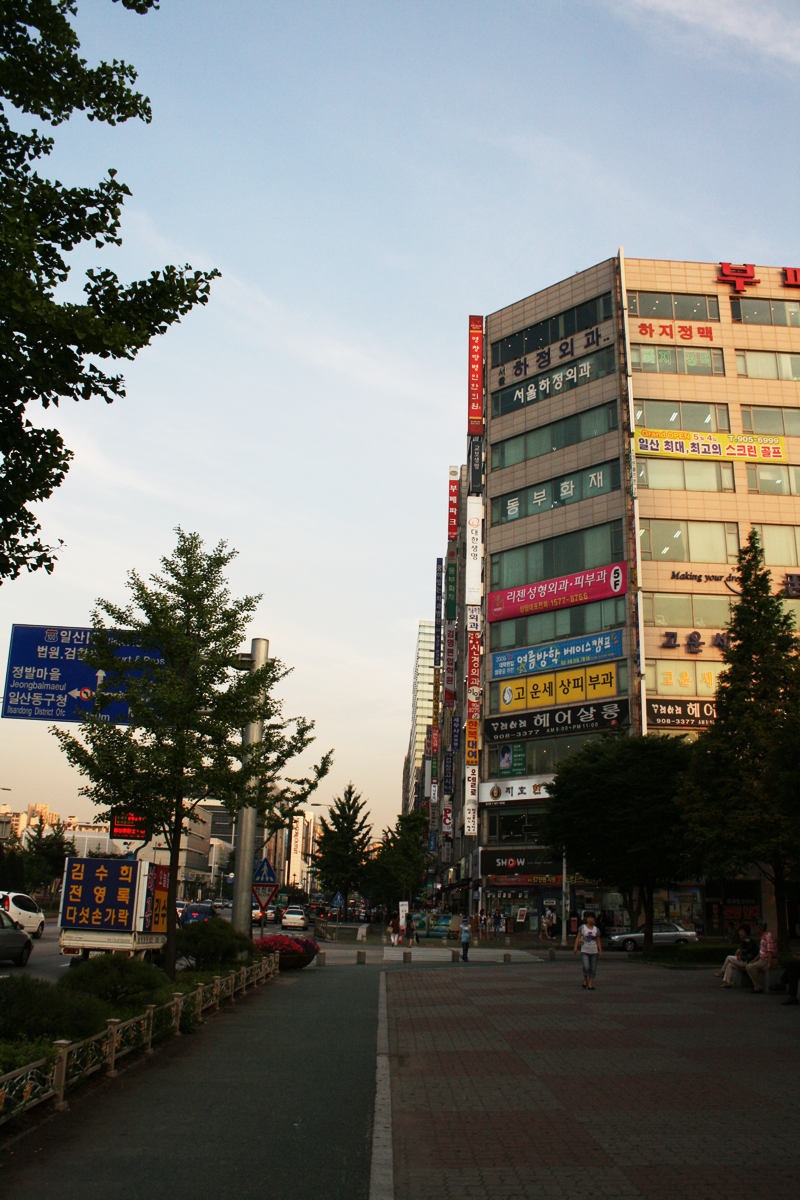
Janghangdong, Ilsandong-gu

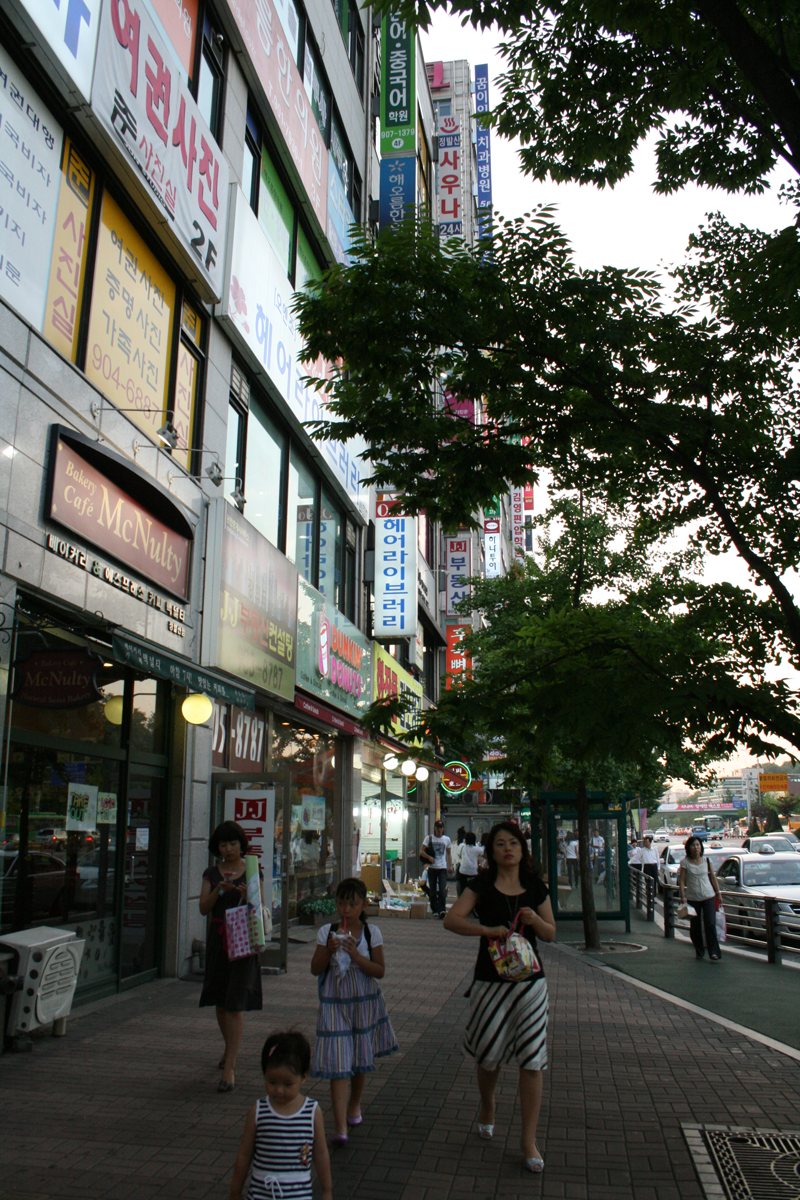
Janghangdong, Ilsandong-gu

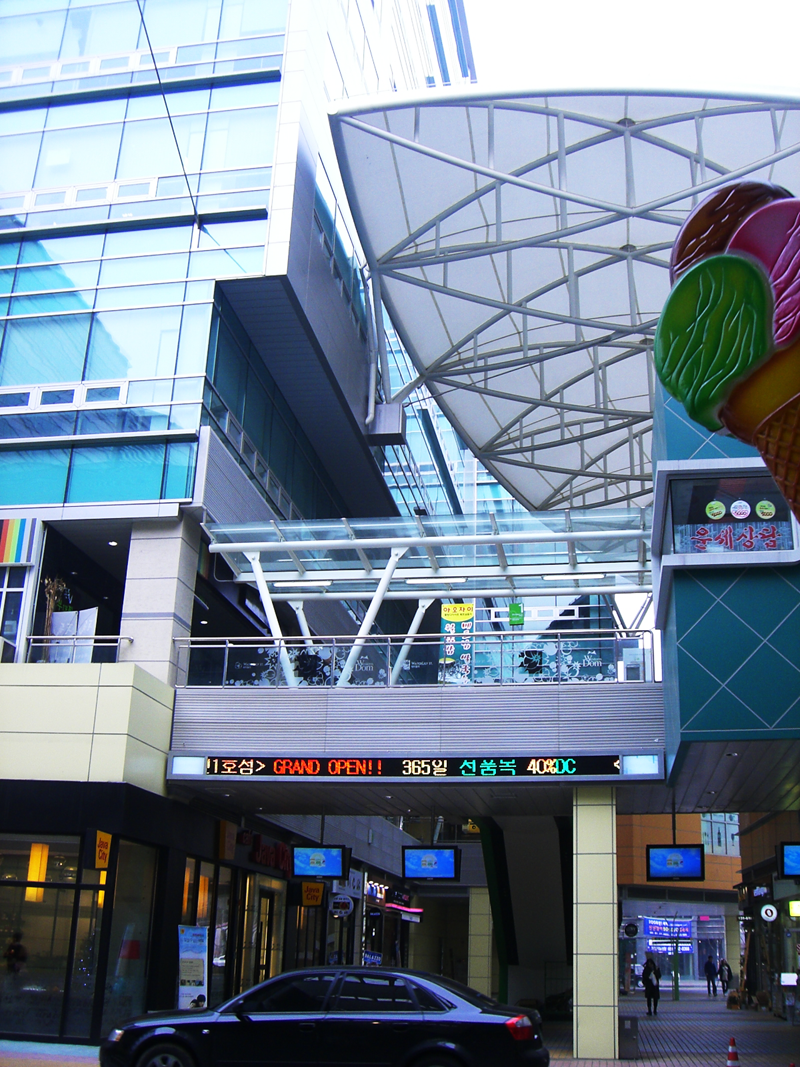
Western Dom, Ilsandong-gu

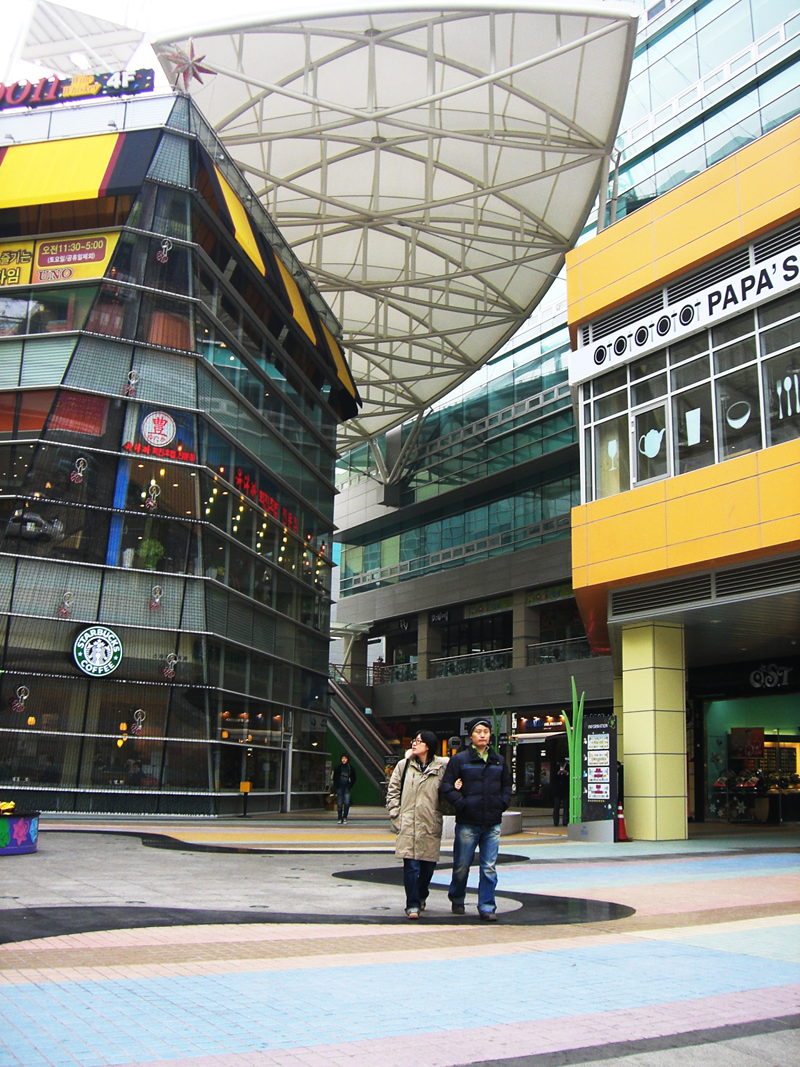
Western Dom, Ilsandong-gu

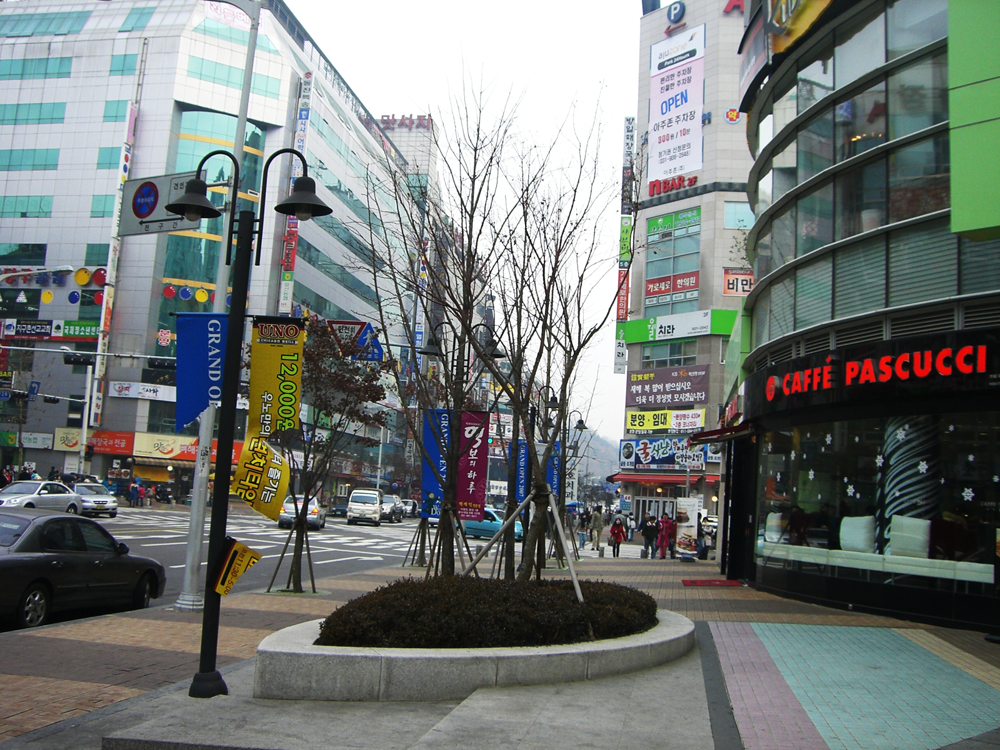
Typical street in Ilsan

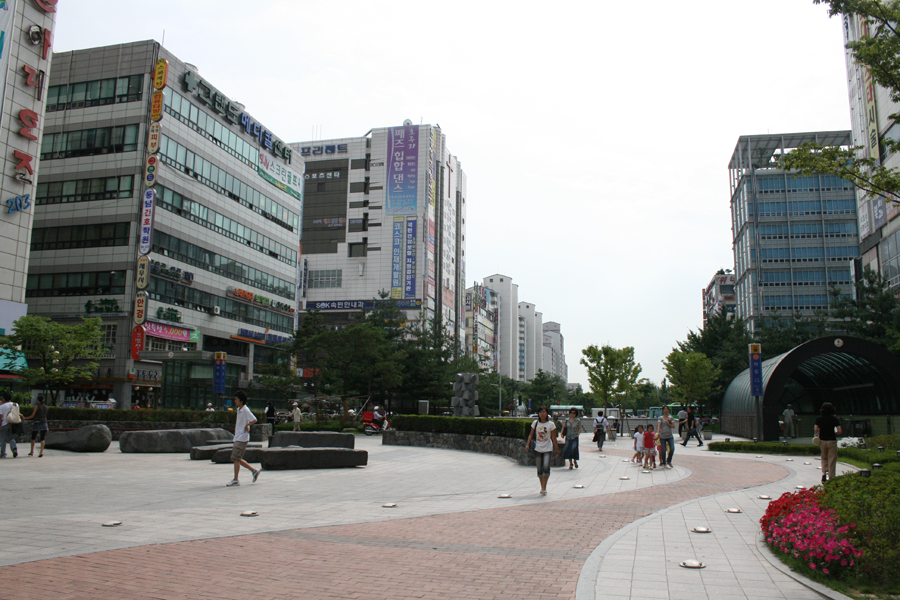
Madu Subway Station, Ilsandong-gu
