= Star's Lover =

2008 South Korean television series

- Promotional poster
- Also known as: Celebrity's Sweetheart
- Hangul: 스타의 연인
- Hanja: 스타의 戀人
- RR: Seutaui yeonin
- MR: Sŭt'aŭi yŏnin
- Genre: Romance, Drama
- Written by: Oh Soo-yeon
- Directed by: Boo Sung-chul
- Starring: Choi Ji-woo; Yoo Ji-tae
- Country of origin: South Korea
- Original language: Korean
- No. of seasons: 1
- No. of episodes: 20

Production
- Production locations: South Korea, Japan
- Running time: Wednesdays and Thursdays at 21:55 (KST)
- Production company: Olive9

Original release
- Network: SBS TV
- Release: 10 December 2008 – 12 February 2009

Star's Lover (Korean: 스타의 연인; also known as Celebrity's Sweetheart) is a 2008 South Korean television series starring Choi Ji-woo and Yoo Ji-tae that aired on SBS. A love story between a star actress and an ordinary man, director Boo Sung-chul said the series was inspired by the 1999 film Notting Hill.

== Plot ==
Lee Ma-ri (Choi Ji-woo) is a top star in South Korea and throughout Asia. The head of her management agency, Seo Tae-suk (Sung Ji-ru), hires a ghostwriter to help transform Ma-ri's image. Poverty-stricken university lecturer Kim Chul-soo (Yoo Ji-tae) takes the job in order to earn money to repay his ex-girl friend, who paid for his college tuition. Whilst they are in Japan he falls in love with Ma-ri. However, when the travel essay book Lovers in Asuka, written by Chul-soo on Ma-ri's behalf, becomes a bestseller, Ma-ri gets caught up in the controversy generated by the ghost writing. The two lovers try to continue their relationship away from media attention, but obstacles abound: eligible young executive Jung Woo-jin (Lee Ki-woo), who pursues Ma-ri; Ma-ri's first love Kang Woo-jin (Choi Phillip), who suddenly vanished from her life; Chul-soo's ex-girlfriend Choi Eun-young (Cha Ye-ryun); and the manipulative Seo Tae-suk, who seeks to control everything in Ma-ri's life.

== Cast ==
=== Main characters ===
- Choi Ji-woo: Lee Ma-ri
  - Jung Da-bin: child Ma-ri
  - Park Bo-young: young Ma-ri
- Yoo Ji-tae: Kim Chul-soo
  - Kang Yi-seok: child Chul-soo
- Lee Ki-woo: Jung Woo-jin
- Cha Ye-ryun: Choi Eun-young

=== Supporting characters ===
- Sung Ji-ru: Seo Tae-suk, CEO of Ma-ri's management agency
- Ki Tae-young: Son Ha-young
- Choi Phillip: Kang Woo-jin
- Lee Joon-hyuk: Min Jang-soo, Ma-ri's bodyguard
- Jung In-seo: In-seo
- Yang Hee-kyung: Lee Seung-yeon, Ma-ri's stylist
- Shin Min-hee: Kim Yu-ri, Chul-soo's sister
- Jung Woon-taek: Jun Byung-joon
- Shim Eun-jin: Ye-rin
- Ban Hyo-jung: Ma-ri's grandmother
- Kwak Hyun-hwa: Lee Eun-sil
- Lee Seung-hyung: Choi Seung-wook
- Yoon Joo-sang: Professor Ahn
- Lee Jong-nam: Choi Ryun-hee
- Kim Ji-young: Kim Ok-ja
- Kim Ye-ryeong: Lee Ji-soon
- Kim Ji-sook: Bo-young, Chul-soo's mother
- Bae Ki-bum: Chul-soo's father
- Lee Young-eun: student (cameo, ep 1)
- Gong Hyung-jin: Hong Kong movie director (cameo, ep 1)
- Shin Hyun-joon: department store magnate (cameo, ep 1)
- Kim Ji-seok : actor (cameo, ep 1)
- Ji Jin-hee: actor, Ma-ri's ex-boyfriend (cameo, ep 8)
- Lee Dong-gun: Eun-young's friend (cameo, ep 20)
- Min Joon-hyun: entertainment journalist
- Song Young-kyu

== Ratings ==
Date	Episode	Nationwide	Seoul
2008-12-10	1	9.5% (17th)	9.8% (14th)
2008-12-11	2	8.8% (17th)	9.3% (16th)
2008-12-17	3	6.8%	8.7%
2008-12-18	4	7.0%	8.5%
2008-12-24	5	5.9%	8.0%
2008-12-25	6	7.6%	9.8%
2009-01-01	7	9.1%	10.1%
2009-01-01	8	7.8%	10.1%
2009-01-07	9	7.9%	9.1%
2009-01-08	10	7.5%	8.5%
2008-01-14	11	7.4%	8.9%
2009-01-15	12	6.2%	8.5%
2009-01-21	13	7.6%	8.4%
2009-01-22	14	7.3%	8.5
2009-01-28	15	8.2%	9.0% (19th)
2009-01-29	16	9.2%	8.8% (19th)
2009-02-04	17	8.3%	8.4%
2009-02-05	18	9.0%	8.8
2009-02-11	19	5.3%	8.3%
2009-02-12	20	7.2%	8.5%
Average		7.6%	8.9%

Source: TNS Media Korea

== Production ==
As of the twelfth episode Choi was reported to have worn 147 outfits, thus averaging 12 ensembles per episode, with episode two alone featuring 25 different outfits. The sheer volume of clothing and range of styles is in line with her character as a top actress.

Many of the scenes were filmed on location in Seoul and Busan.

- Episode 20: Ilsan Lake Park, Janghang-dong, Ilsan District, Goyang, Gyeonggi Province.
- Episode 8 and 19: Il Mare, an Italian restaurant, located in front of Ilsan Lake Park.
- Seoul National University: the university of Chul-soo's employment, his lectures and Ma-ri's visit to the school were filmed at the gallery, Gyujanggak, and museum roads. This is the first time the university allowed its campus to be used as a filming location.
- Haeundae Beach and Dongbaek Island, Busan: The scene where Ma-ri confesses her love for Chul-soo and the couple takes a walk on the beach.

== International broadcast ==
It first aired in Japan on satellite channel WOWOW beginning May 1, 2009. Reruns followed on terrestrial network TBS from September 27 to October 22, 2010, and on cable channel KNTV from November 9 to December 4, 2009.

In Thailand it first aired on Modernine TV in 2011.
