= Ilsandong District =

District of Goyang, South Korea

- Non-autonomous District
- Panoramic view of Ilsandong District

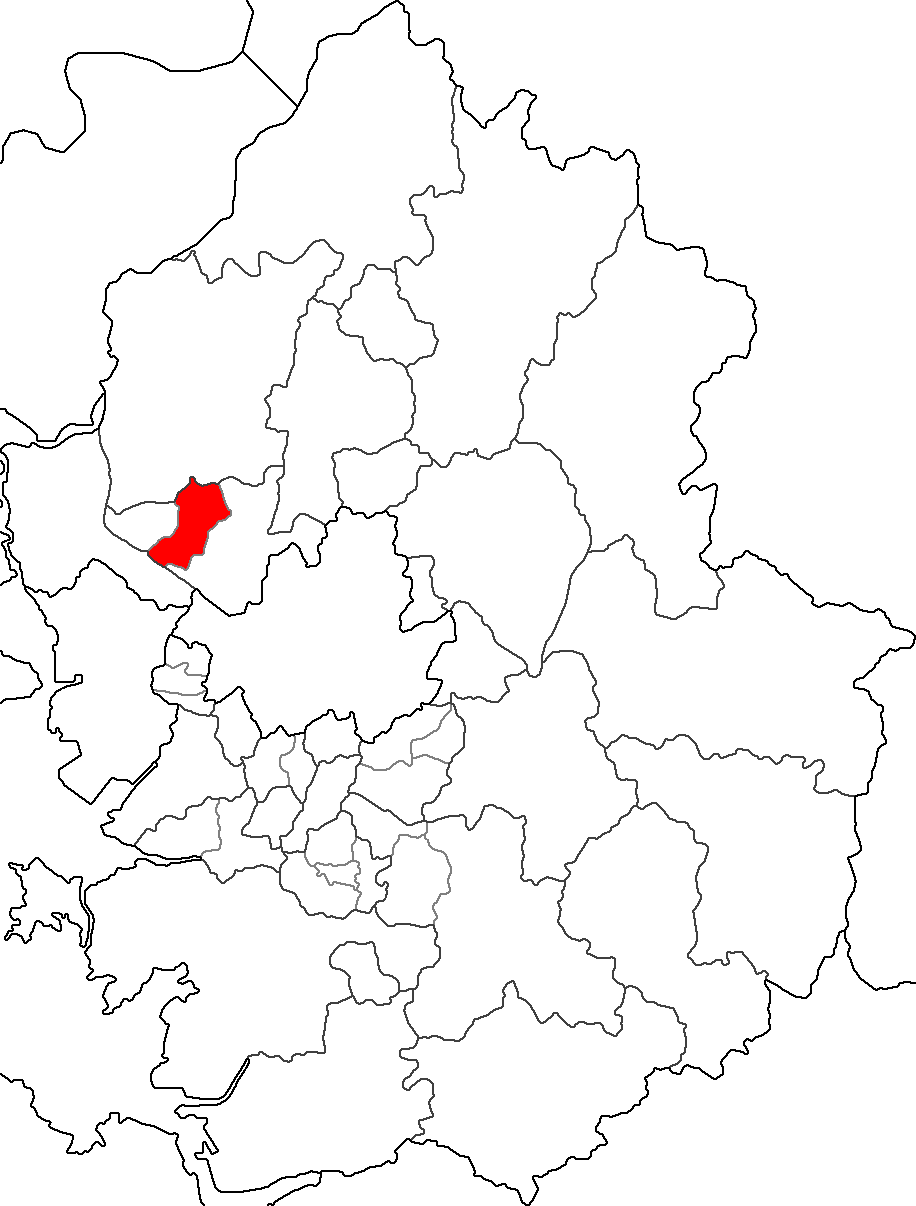
- Map of Gyeonggi highlighting Ilsandong District.
- Country: South Korea
- Region: Sudogwon (Gijeon)
- Province: Gyeonggi
- City: Goyang
- Administrative divisions: 11 dong

Population
  - Dialect: Seoul
- Website: Ilsandong District Office

Korean name
- Hangul: 일산동구
- Hanja: 一山東區
- RR: Ilsandong-gu
- MR: Ilsandong-gu

Ilsandong District (Korean: 일산동구) is a district in Goyang, South Korea. Ilsan-gu was divided into Ilsandong District, meaning 'east of Ilsan' and Ilsanseo District, meaning 'west', on May 16, 2005.

== Administration ==
Ilsandong District is divided into 11 dong (동, "neighborhoods"):

- Siksa-dong (식사동)
- Jungsan-dong (중산동)
- Pungsan-dong (풍산동)
- Baekseok 1 and 2-dong (백석1~2동)
- Madu 1 and 2-dong (마두1~2동)
- Janghang 1 and 2-dong (장항1~2동)
- Gobong-dong (고봉동) [divided into Jiyeong-dong, Seongseok-dong, Seolmun-dong and Sarihyeon-dong (지영동, 성석동, 설문동, 사리현동)]

== Attractions ==
The National Cancer Center of Korea is located in Ilsan. Ilsan is also home to Lake Park (호수공원). The lake covers 72.9 acres (295,000 m^{2}) and is the largest artificial lake in Asia. There are several recreational facilities such as promenade road, bicycle path, inline skating, walking, and a jogging trail that encircles the lake. Lake Park also features a large variety of wild flowers and plants, such as cactus arboretum and botanical gardens. It is the venue for the annual Goyang World Flower Festival and the filming location of Seoul Broadcasting System's drama Star's Lover.

The area surrounding Lake Park is a large and sprawling commercial district, which includes the Lotte Department Store, Grand Department Store, Hyundai Department Store, as well as La Festa shopping complex and the Western Dom which hosts hundreds of stores, restaurants, entertainment venues, and bars. La Festa and Western Dom draw in thousands of young people. The bars and nightclubs are open until early morning hours every day. Ilsan is also the site of an annual electric lights festival. Its dynamic culture and beautiful urban landscape have attracted production of numerous Korean TV shows. As a result, MBC and SBS, two of the three largest television networks, relocated their production centres to Ilsan.

Jeongbalsan Park is located in the center of Ilsan. It is a large residential park which features a large hiking hill with trails, a large Buddhist temple, some historical thatched roof houses, and an outdoor gymnasium.

The Goyang Aram Complex is also located in Ilsan between Lake Park and Jeongbalsan mountain. The theater has 1,887 seats. It is the only wind-pipe concert hall north of the Han River with more than 1,000 seats.

== Education ==
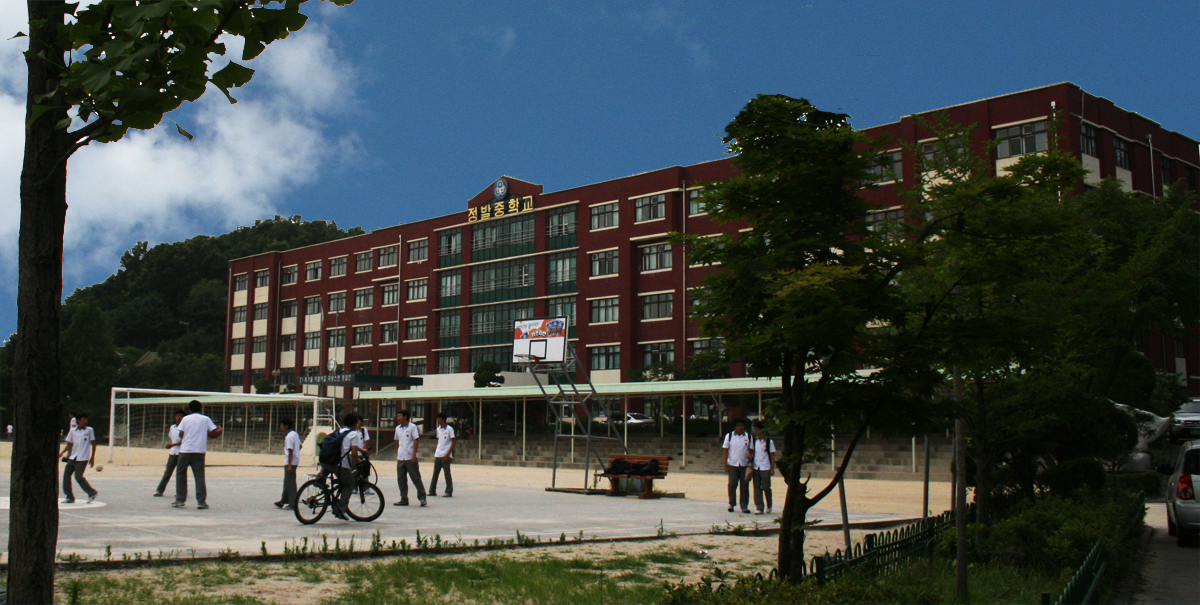
Jungball Middle School (정발중학교) in Ilsandong District

Ilsandong District has 33 schools, including 19 elementary schools, 6 middle schools, 7 high schools, and 1 special school. Baengma (백마) is notable for its hagwons, or cram schools, and many hagwons operate in the region.

== Photos ==
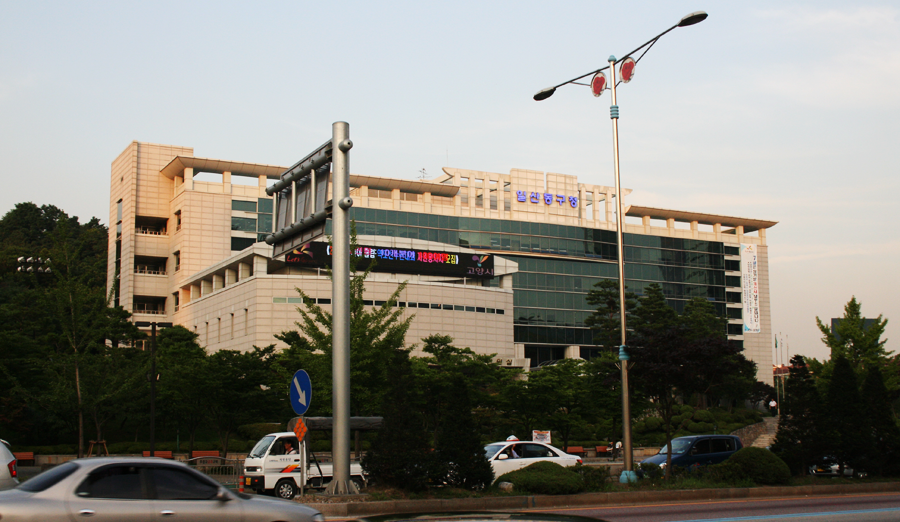
Ilsan City Hall

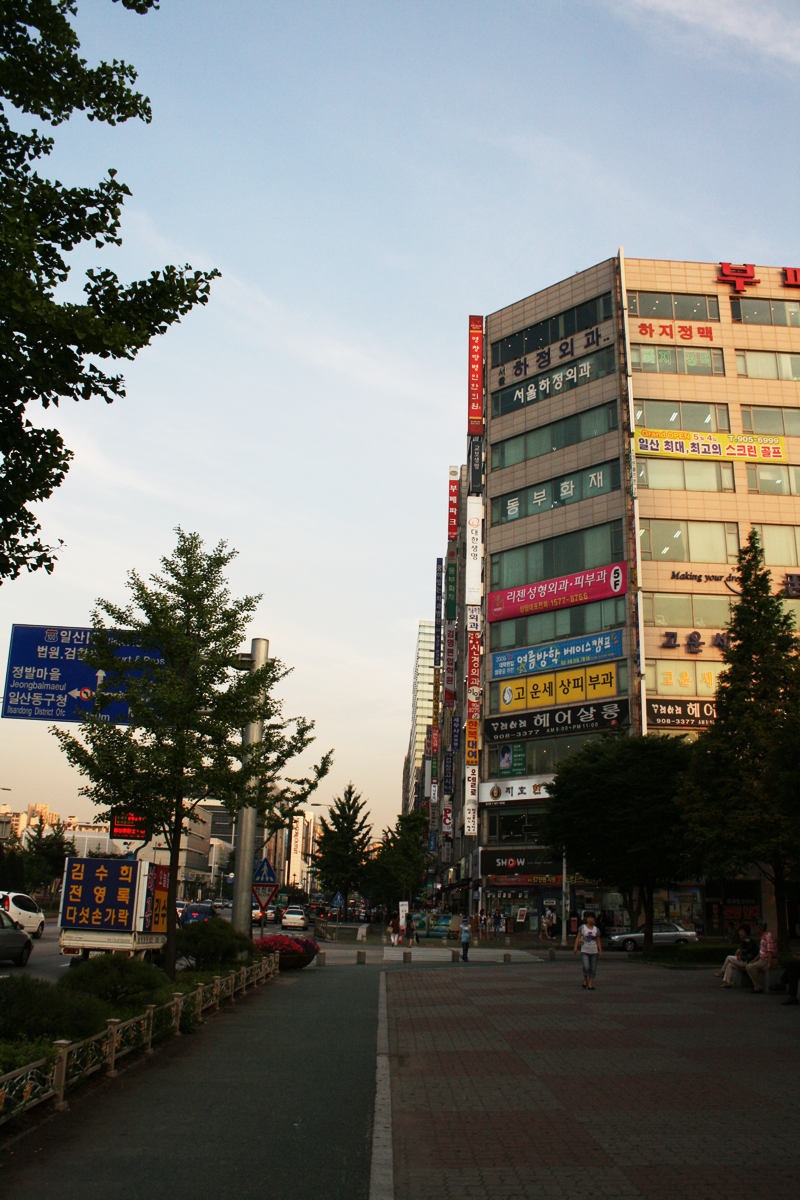
Janghangdong, Ilsandong District

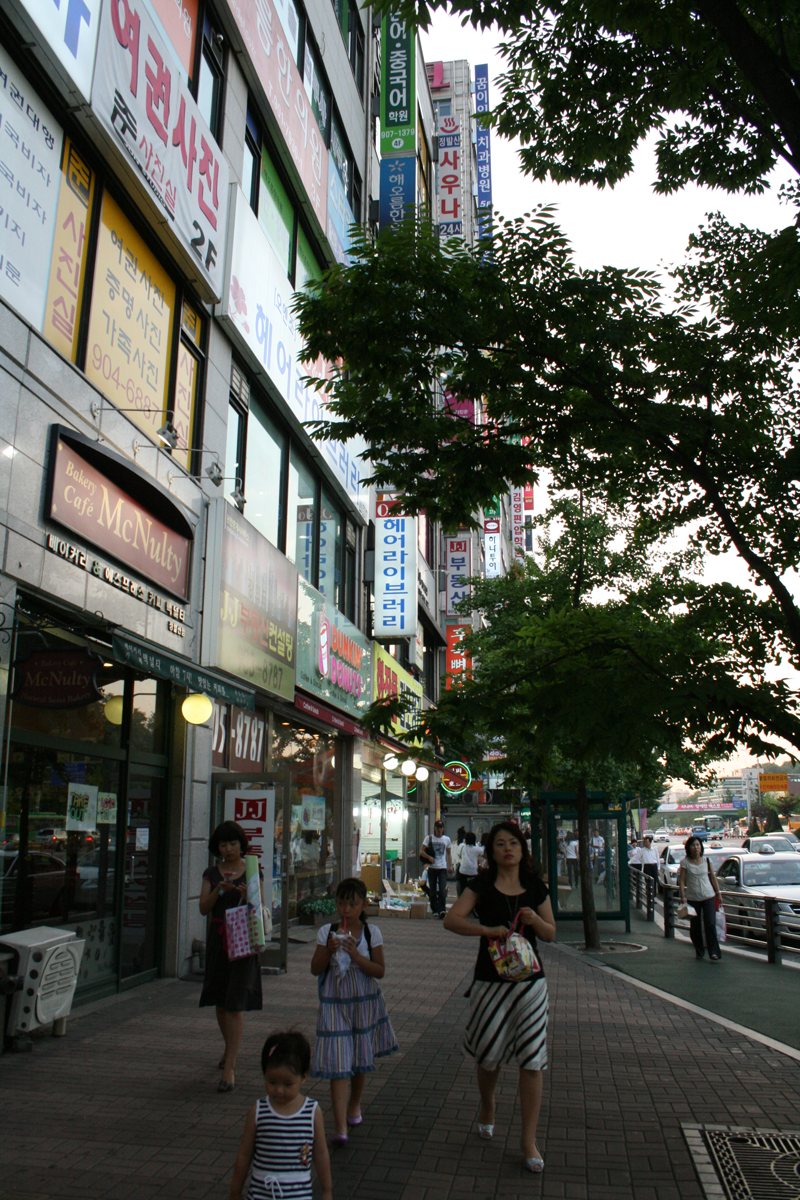
Janghangdong, Ilsandong District

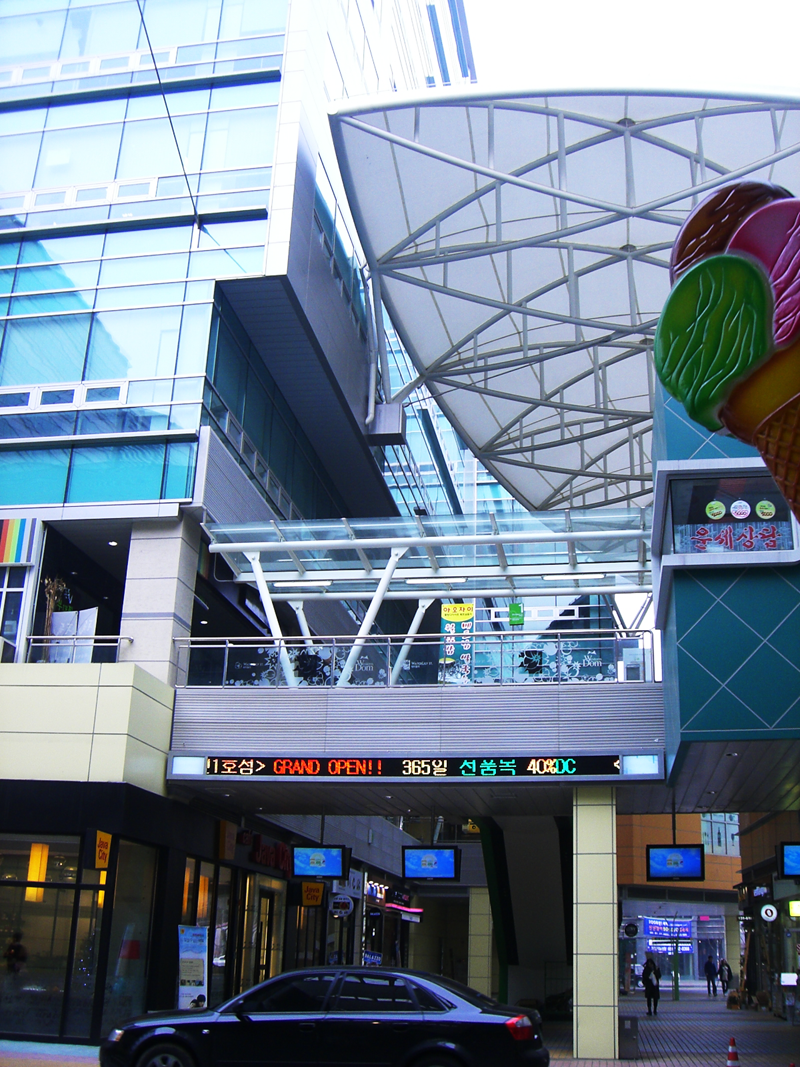
Western Dom, Ilsandong District

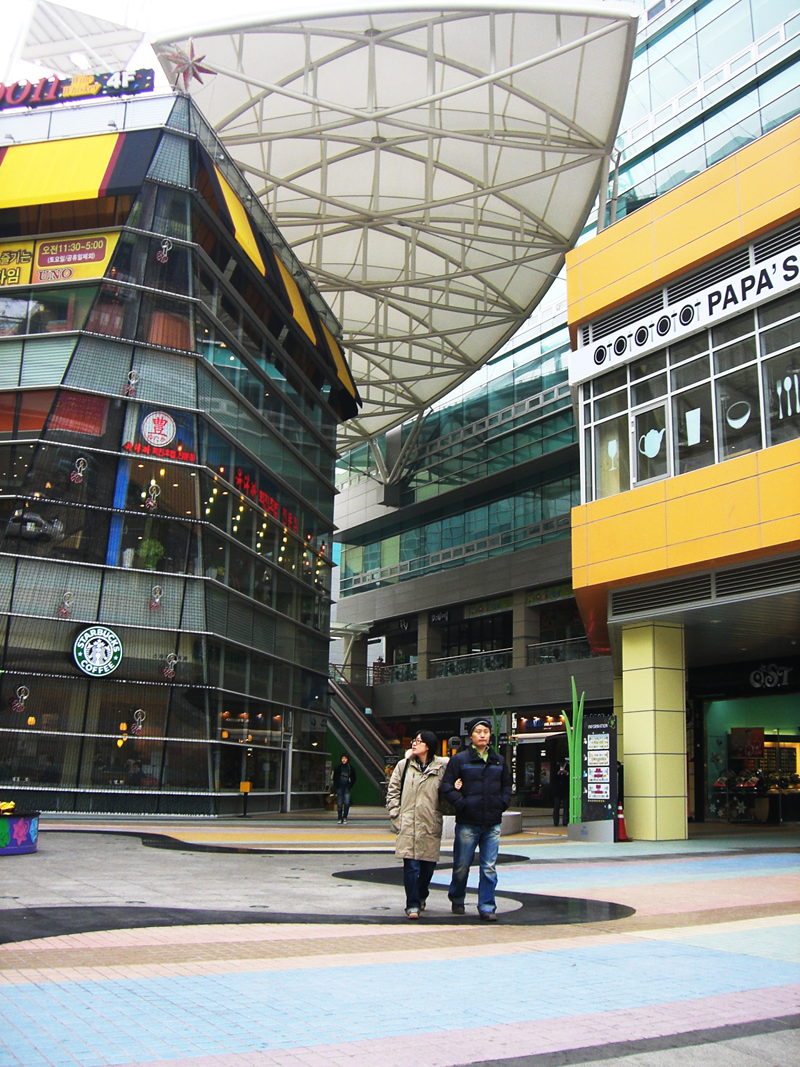
Western Dom, Ilsandong District

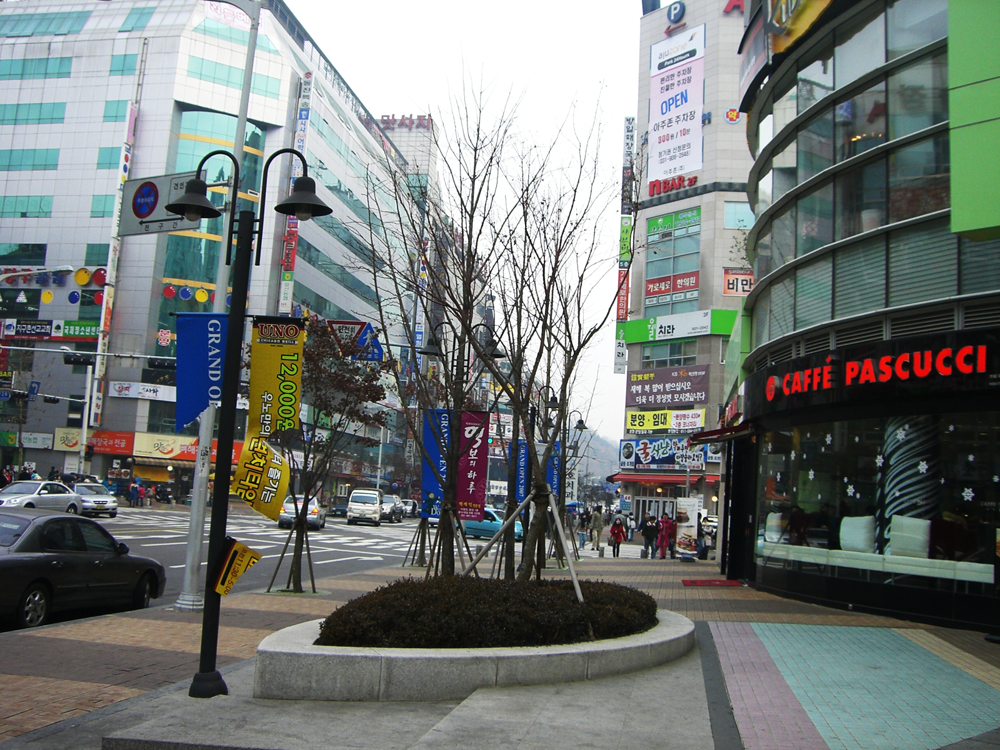
Typical street in Ilsan

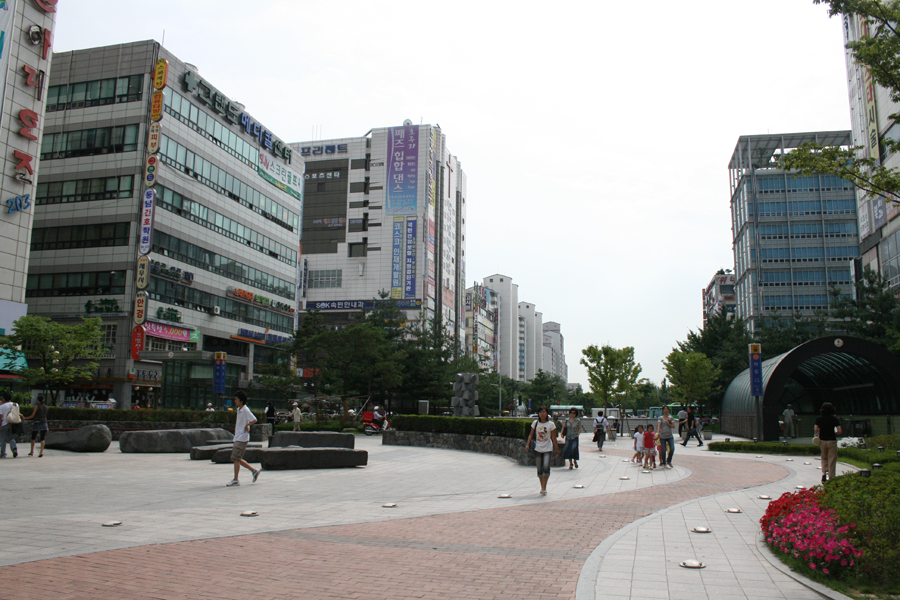
Madu Subway Station, Ilsandong District
