= Ilsan Lake Park =

Park in Goyang, South Korea

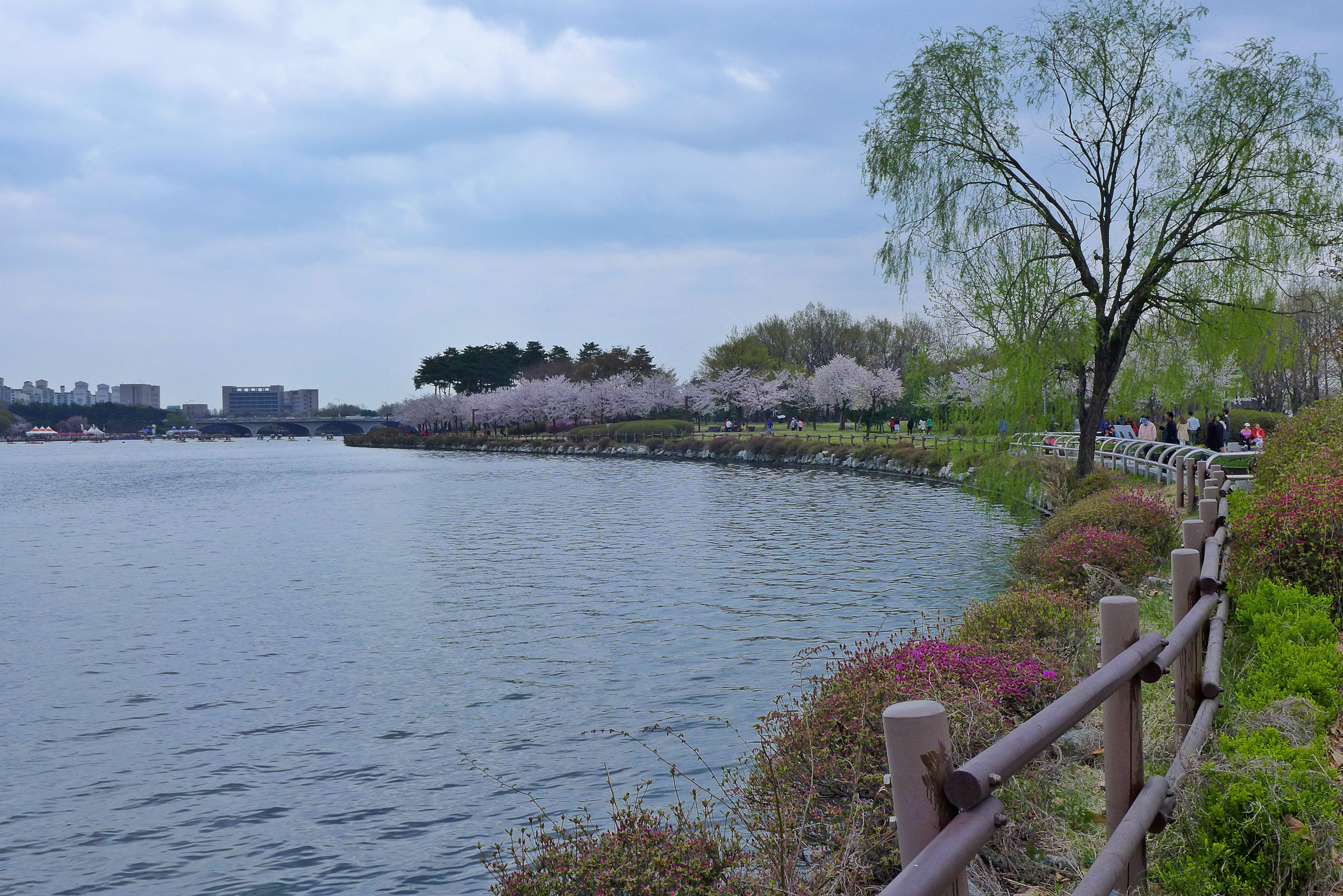
- The park (2013)
- Interactive map of Ilsan Lake Park
- Coordinates: 37.658°N 126.764°E

Ilsan Lake Park (Korean: 일산 호수공원; RR: Ilsan Hosu Gongwon) is a public park in Janghang-dong, Ilsandong District, Goyang, Gyeonggi Province, South Korea.

== History and layout ==
Ilsan Lake Park was opened on 4 May 1996 with a total space of approximately 1,034,000 square metres (11,130,000 sq ft). It was constructed over a period of about 3 years (from Jan 1993 to Dec 1995). The lake's surface area is approximately 300,000 square metres (3,200,000 sq ft) and is reportedly the largest artificial lake in Asia.

== Features ==
The lake has an island in the middle called Dalmaji Island (달맞이섬) that has a pavilion called Weolpajeong (월파정). There are bridges on both sides of the lake to the island. The park has a number of fountains. Also in the middle of the park, there is Hanul Square (한울 광장), which has hosted various events and performances.

There are several recreational facilities, such as a promenade road, bicycle path, inline skating, walking, and jogging trails that encircle the lake. Ilsan Lake Park also features a large variety of wild flowers and plants, such as cactus, arboretum and botanical gardens.

"The park features a permanent 'World Artist Garden' section, which includes installations by renowned landscape designers such as Hwang Ji-hae (South Korea), as well as artists from South Africa and the UK. These gardens were established during the 2024 Goyang International Flower Expo and remain as permanent cultural landmarks within the park."

It is the venue for the annual Goyang International Flower Festival. It was the filming location of Seoul Broadcasting System's drama Star's Lover.
