= Korea International Exhibition Center =

Convention center in Goyang, South Korea

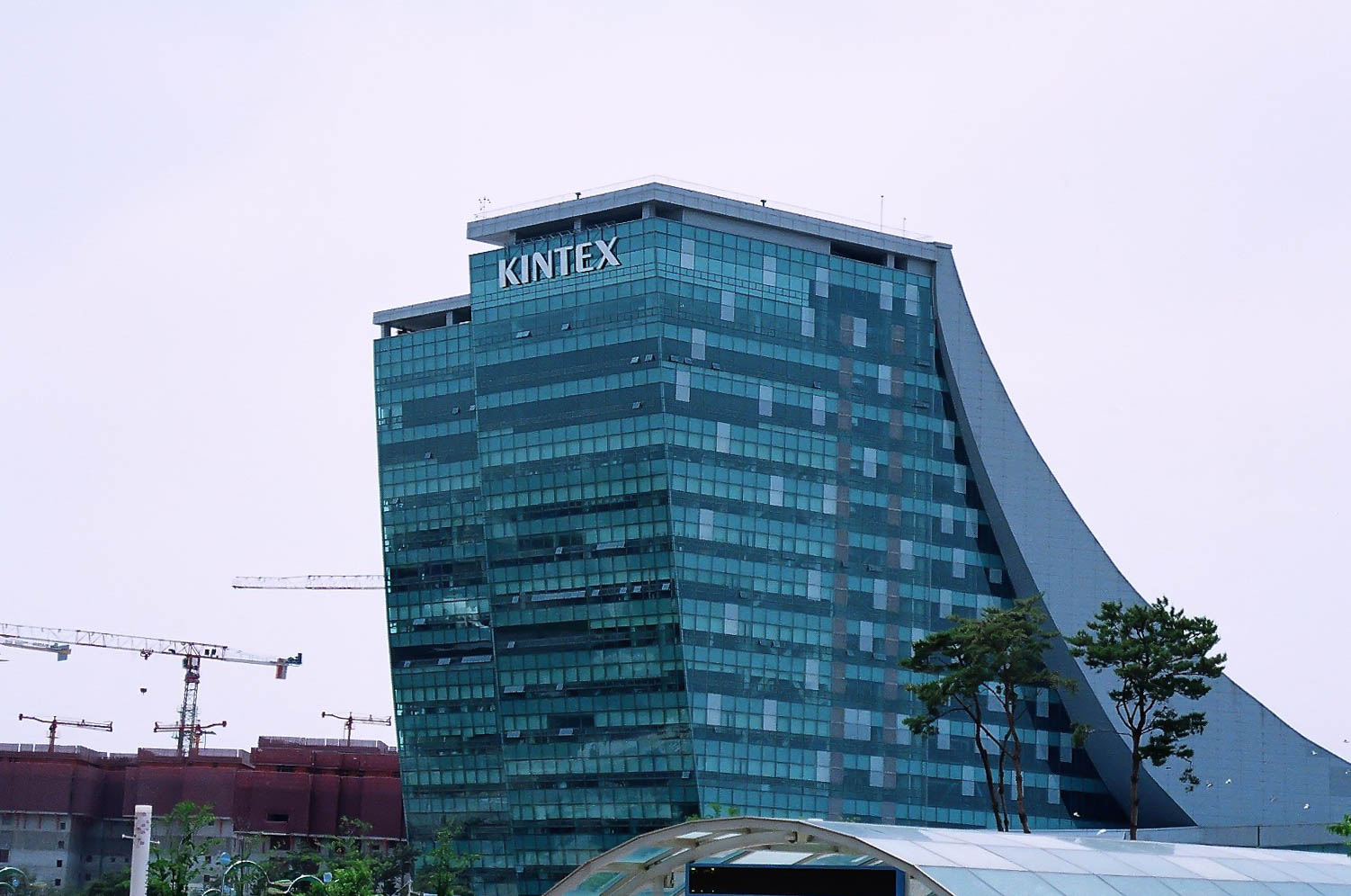
- Interactive map of the Korea International Exhibition Center area

General information
- Location: 217-60, Kintex-ro, Ilsanseo-gu, Goyang, Gyeonggi Province, South Korea
- Coordinates: 37°40′8″N 126°44′44″E
- Completed: 2005; 2011
- Owner: KINTEX Inc.

Website
- www.kintex.com

Korea International Exhibition Center (Korean: 킨텍스; commonly known as KINTEX) is a convention and exhibition center located in Ilsanseo-gu, Goyang, Gyeonggi Province, approximately 23 kilometres (14 mi) from Seoul, South Korea. It comprises two exhibition centers, one of which is connected to the office building of its parent company KINTEX Inc., and is the largest "MICE" venue in South Korea.

== Overview ==
It is a three-storey building on a 224,800 m^{2} (2,420,000 sq ft) plot of land between Ilsan's central road, Chungangno, and the Han River. It has a total indoor exhibition area of 108,049 m^{2} (1,163,030 sq ft), the only exhibition center in Korea which has bigger area than 100,000 m^{2} (1,100,000 sq ft). Shortly after opening, it hosted the 2005 Seoul Motor Show.

== History ==
- 1999 04 Confirmed for Goyang city to attract the construction of an International Exhibition Center
- 2002 02 Goyang International Exhibition Center was officially titled KINTEX (Korea International Exhibition Center)
- 2003 03 Launched KINTEX CI
- 2005 04 Grand Opening of the first KINTEX Center
- 2006 12 Changed the corporate name to KINTEX, conducted the feasibility study for the second exhibition center
- 2007 07 Verified the validity to construct the second exhibition center
- 2008 12 Appointed the Hyundai Engineering and Construction Consortium to construct the second exhibition center
- 2009 07 Started the Construction for the second exhibition center

== Facilities ==
- Indoor exhibition area: first exhibition center 53,541 m^{2} (576,310 sq ft), second exhibition center 54,508 m^{2} (586,720 sq ft)
- Outdoor exhibition area: first exhibition center 2,849 m^{2} (30,670 sq ft), second exhibition center 68,000 m^{2} (730,000 sq ft)
- Event hall: seating capacity of 6,000 seats
- 26 meeting rooms
- Grand ballroom

== Notable events ==
As the country's largest exhibition center, KINTEX has hosted many regional trade fairs (organized by KOTRA) as well as international conventions and exhibitions. It is the main venue of the biennial Seoul Motor Show and is one of the venues of the Goyang International Flower Festival.

Kintex held Harvard WorldMUN 2015, and will host the World Universities Debating Championships in 2021.

=== Sports ===
KINTEX was the venue of the 2009 World Weightlifting Championships and the 2010 All That Skate figure skating show.

=== Entertainment ===
The venue has hosted various events such as SBS's year-end music program Gayo Daejeon, the 2013 Mnet 20's Choice Awards, Infinite Challenge Expo in December 2015 to January 2016, the 2016 tvN10 Awards, the 31st Golden Disc Awards and, more recently, the Booting Evaluations stage of the survival competition The Unit. The 32nd Golden Disc Awards will take place at KINTEX on January 10–11, 2018.

The organizing committee of "Anime X Game Festival 2026 (hereinafter AGF 2026)" announced on the 19th that the date and venue of the event have been confirmed. The event will be held for three days from December 4 to 6 at the first exhibition hall of KINTEX in Ilsan (1 to 5 holes).

Pethroom, a pet brand of BMsmile, a global pet healthcare company whose mission is to protect organic animals, announced that it has completed its participation in the "2026 K-Pet Fair Ilsan (first half of Mega Week)" held at the KINTEX 2nd Exhibition Center in Ilsan from May 29 to 31.

Tours and concerts

| Date | Artist(s) | Event |
|---|---|---|
| 16 March 2009 | Sarah Brightman | The Symphony World Tour |
| 26–27 January 2013 | Kim Jae-joong | I/MINE concerts |
| 3 November 2012 | Dr. Dre | |
| 21–29 December 2013 | SM Town (SHINee, Girls' Generation, f(x), EXO, TVXQ and Super Junior) | SMTOWN Week Music Festival |
| 17–18 December 2016 | Shinhwa | Winter Special Live: UNCHANGING |
| 4 February 2017 | g.o.d | god to MEN National Tour |
| 23–24 December 2017 | Sechs Kies | 20th Anniversary National Tour |
| 15 May 2024 | Ado | Hibana World Tour |
| 13 December 2025 | Doja Cat | Tour Ma Vie World Tour |

=== Tests ===
Many important tests, such as civil service examination and Company entrance examination are taken in the KINTEX.
