= Goyang =

City in Gyeonggi, South Korea

Coordinates: 37°39′N 126°48′E

- Specific city
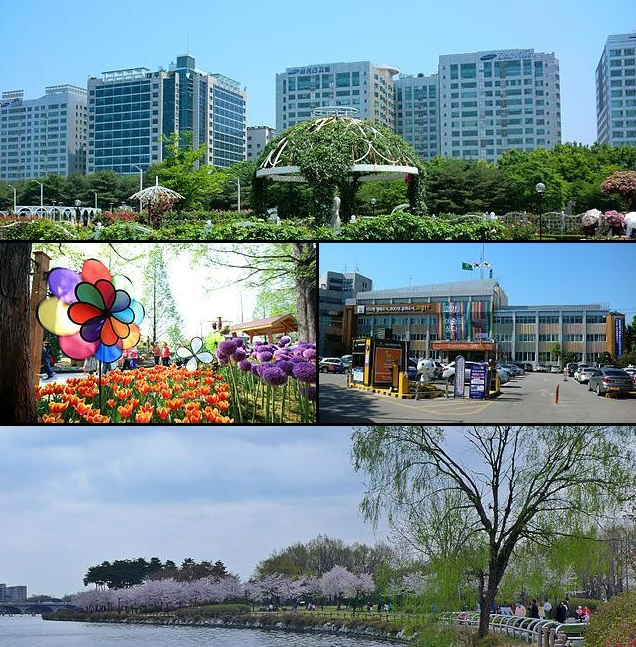

- Flag Emblem of Goyang

- Location in South Korea
- Country: South Korea
- Province: Gyeonggi
- Region: Sudogwon
- Administrative divisions: 3 gu, 39 dong

Government
  - Type: Mayor-Council
  - Mayor: Min Kyeong-seon (Democratic)
  - Council: Goyang City Council

Area
  - Total: 286.1 km^{2} (110.5 sq mi)

Population (July, 2025)
  - Total: 1,061,752
  - Density: 3,711/km^{2} (9,612/sq mi)
  - Dialect: Seoul

Korean name
- Hangul: 고양시
- Hanja: 高陽市
- RR: Goyang-si
- MR: Koyang-si

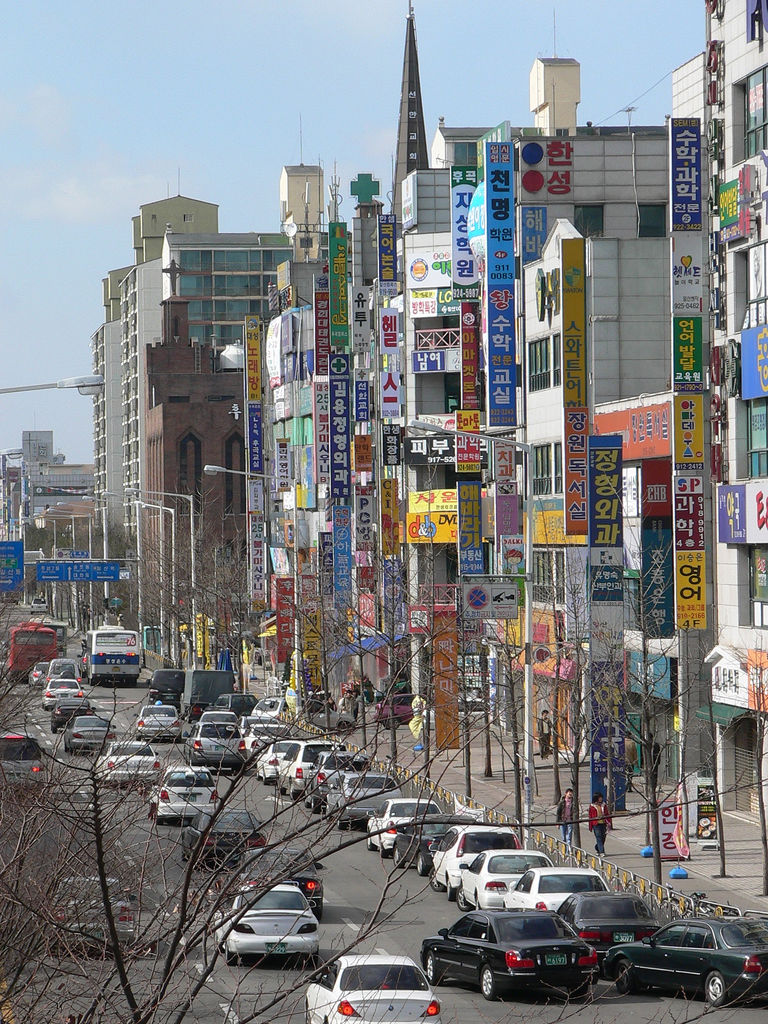
Street view of Goyang

Goyang (Korean: 고양; Korean pronunciation: [ko.jaŋ]) is a city in Gyeonggi Province in the northern part of South Korea. It is part of the Seoul Metropolitan Area, making Goyang one of Seoul's satellite cities. It is one of the largest cities in the Seoul Metropolitan Area, with a population of just over 1 million. Ilsan, a planned city, is located in the Ilsandong District and Ilsanseo Districts of Goyang. It also includes Deogyang District which is closer to Seoul.

Several institutions of higher learning are located in Goyang. These include Agricultural Cooperative College, Korea Aerospace University, and Transnational Law and Business University.

== Notable places ==
Historic remains

- Bukhansanseong Fortress
- Heungguksa Temple
- Seosamneung and Seooreung Royal Tombs, UNESCO World Heritage Sites
- Haengju seowon (Confucial Academy)
- Ilsan Bamgasi Choga (Straw-roofed House)

Exhibitions

- Goyang Aram Nuri Arts Center
- Goyang Oulim Nuri Arts Center
- KINTEX
- Aerospace Museum
- Baedari Korean Traditional Wine Museum
- Theme Zoo Park "Zoo Zoo"
- Cultural Center and Museum of Latin America
- Nongshim Theme Park
- Hyundai Motor Studio Goyang
- Hanhwa Aqua Planet aquarium

Entertainment and shopping

- MBC Dream Center
- SBS Broadcasting Center
- Western Dorm
- Lafesta
- Lotte Department Store
- Hyundai Department Store
- New-Core Outlet
- Hwajeong station
- Starfield Goyang
- IKEA Goyang
- Costco Wholesale Ilsan

Leisure

- Bukhansan
- Jeongbal Mountain
- Go Bong Mountain
- Lake Park
- Goyang Sports Complex
- Korea Aerospace university

== Regular festivals ==
- Haengjusanseong Fortress Sun Rise Festival

On New Year's Day each year, a festival is observed at Haengjusanseong for the beginning of the sunrise.

Time: 5:00-9:00 AM on New Year's Day each year Place: The top of the mountain where Haengju Sanseong sits.

- The Great Battle of Haengju Festival

The event is held to commemorate an important victory in Korean history (14 March) at Haengju Sanseong. Elementary school kids and their parents from the neighborhood can watch memorial services for patriotic martyrs of the nation and learn about the history of Haengju Sanseong.

Time: 10 AM on 14 March each year Place: Chungjang Shrine at Haengju Sanseoeng

- Goyang International Flower Festival

Floricultural industry sprang up in the early 1970s fostering flower culture in Korea. Goyang became one of the most famous cities for its floricultural industry and its flower show grew into a horticultural event representing Korea and a venue for trading among participants at home and from abroad.

-Time: early April each year -Place: Areas surrounding Ilsan Lake Park

- Goyang Lake Art Festival

The event is a free-style arts festival held at various locations around Lake Park. Artists perform in street spaces rather than traditional stages. The festival features a range of performing arts, including jazz, mime, dance, drama, and installation art, alongside site decorations, performances by international theatrical companies, and fireworks.

Time: October each year Place: locations around the Lake Park

== Geography ==
Ilsan New Town vaguely comes to mind, but in reality, the eastern boundary is Bukhansan, not Ilsan New Town, the western boundary is the Han River, and the city's area is 286.1 km^{2}. Bukhansan protrudes to the east, and the eastern end of the border with Seoul is actually a hilly area connecting Mt. Aengbong and Mt. Bongsan. Across the Han River to the west is the city of Gimpo.

At the time of the expansion of Seoul, the eastern area was given to Seoul, but Bukhansan was guided, so the administrative divisions vaguely resemble a kitchen knife. Bukhansan Mountain is clearly visible from the vicinity of Jichuk, and it can be roughly estimated the weather on that day by how visible it is.

=== Climate ===
Goyang has a monsoon-influenced humid continental climate (Köppen: Dwa) with cold, dry winters and hot, rainy summers.

Climate data for Goyang (1993–2020 normals)
Month	Jan	Feb	Mar	Apr	May	Jun	Jul	Aug	Sep	Oct	Nov	Dec	Year
Mean daily maximum °C (°F)	2.2 (36.0)	5.6 (42.1)	11.7 (53.1)	18.6 (65.5)	24.5 (76.1)	28.6 (83.5)	29.7 (85.5)	30.9 (87.6)	27.0 (80.6)	20.8 (69.4)	12.3 (54.1)	4.1 (39.4)	18.0 (64.4)
Daily mean °C (°F)	−3.5 (25.7)	−0.4 (31.3)	5.2 (41.4)	11.8 (53.2)	17.4 (63.3)	22.0 (71.6)	24.8 (76.6)	25.4 (77.7)	20.8 (69.4)	13.8 (56.8)	6.3 (43.3)	−1.2 (29.8)	11.9 (53.4)
Mean daily minimum °C (°F)	−8.8 (16.2)	−6.0 (21.2)	−0.6 (30.9)	5.5 (41.9)	11.3 (52.3)	16.7 (62.1)	21.3 (70.3)	21.5 (70.7)	15.6 (60.1)	7.8 (46.0)	1.0 (33.8)	−6.4 (20.5)	6.6 (43.9)
Average precipitation mm (inches)	10.9 (0.43)	20.2 (0.80)	23.5 (0.93)	58.6 (2.31)	87.3 (3.44)	107.7 (4.24)	359.3 (14.15)	274.1 (10.79)	117.1 (4.61)	44.9 (1.77)	38.9 (1.53)	13.9 (0.55)	1,156.4 (45.53)
Average precipitation days (≥ 0.1 mm)	2.5	2.8	4.1	6.6	7.2	7.6	12.9	11.2	6.5	5.0	6.3	3.9	76.6
Average relative humidity (%)	64.1	63.4	63.9	64.1	69.4	74.3	82.5	81.2	76.8	73.5	70.8	65.8	70.8
Mean monthly sunshine hours	169.4	178.8	229.6	233.6	253.2	240.9	187.2	202.7	193.7	201.5	150.7	159.2	2,400.5
Source 1: Korea Meteorological Administration
Source 2: Weather.Directory

== Sports ==
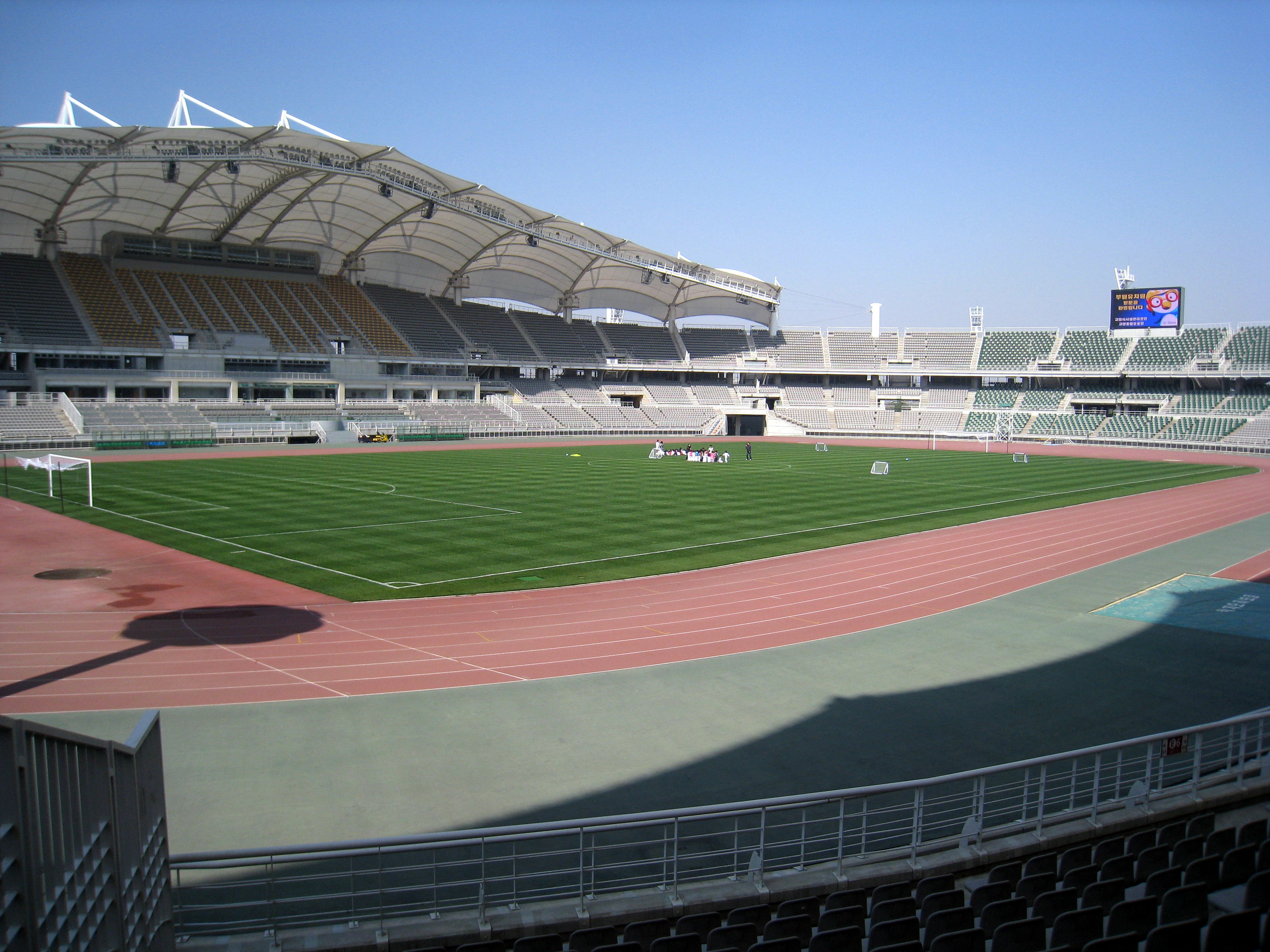
Goyang Stadium

The ice hockey team High1, based in Chuncheon, played some of its home Asia League Ice Hockey matches at the Goyang Ice Rink, before they withdrew from the league in 2019.

Former football teams in Goyang include Goyang KB Kookmin Bank FC and Goyang Zaicro FC. Currently, there is the K4 League team Goyang Citizen FC.

The Korean Basketball League team Goyang Sono Skygunners is also based in the city.

== Transport ==
=== Public transport ===
==== Bike sharing ====
Goyang used to be served by a bike sharing system called Fifteen (KR:피프틴), which was replaced by a new system Tajo (KR:타조).

==== Railroads ====
Subway

- GTX-A: KINTEX. The opening of the GTX-A line significantly improved accessibility from Goyang to central Seoul, reducing travel time between Kintex Station and Seoul Station to approximately 16 minutes.
- Line 3: Jichuk–Daehwa
- Gyeongui-Jungang Line : Korea Aerospace University–Tanhyeon

Commuter Rail

- Gyeongui Line: Korea Aerospace University–Tanhyeon (Neunggok for DMZ Train)

High Speed Railways

- Gyeongbu, Honam, Jeolla, Gyeongjeon and Donghae : Haengsin station

==== Buses ====
Bus stops on Goyang Bus Rapid Transit (BRT)

- Daehwa station
- Ilsanseo-gu office, Paik Hospital
- Ilsandong-gu office
- Daegok station
- Haengsin dong
- Deogeun dong

Types of buses

- Yellow bus: connects nearby
- Green and Blue bus: connects cities

and districts.

- Red Bus: express one, goes a wide area.
- M bus: more express one, goes a wide area, but not included in G bus and Seoul bus

Bus terminals

- Hwajeong terminal: located in Deogyang District
- Goyang terminal: located in Ilsandong District
- Wide-area transportation connecting Seoul and Paju, etc., is developed. Goyang Terminal and Hwajeong Terminal are in charge of intercity transportation, and those who need to use regular trains tend to go to Seoul Station or Yongsan station. However, there is a station attached to the KTX depot, so some KTX trains stop.

== Notable people from Goyang ==
- Do Kyung-soo – singer, dancer, model, actor and member of Exo
- Jinjin – rapper and leader of Astro
- RM – rapper and leader of BTS
- EJ (Byun Eui-joo) – singer, rapper and leader of &TEAM
- Empress Gi – empress of the Yuan dynasty
- Heo Young-ji – singer, television personality and former member of Kara
- Ha Sung-woon – singer and member of Wanna One and Hotshot
- Yohan Hwang – singer
- Jay B – singer and leader of Got7
- Jang Mi-ran – weightlifter
- Jeon So-min – actress, model, entertainer
- Kang Min-hyuk – musician, drummer, singer-songwriter, actor and member of CNBLUE
- Kim Da-som – singer, actress and former member of Sistar
- Hyeseong Kim – baseball player for the Los Angeles Dodgers
- Kim Hyun-joo – actress
- Kim Junsu – singer, model, dancer, stage actor, member of JYJ and former member of TVXQ
- Kwon Yu-ri – singer and member of Girls' Generation
- Lee Do-hyun – actor
- Lee Jun-ho – singer, songwriter, dancer, composer, actor and member of 2PM
- Lee Jung-shin – musician, bassist, singer, rapper, actor and member of CNBLUE
- Eunhyuk – singer, rapper, actor, member of Super Junior
- Sungmin – singer, songwriter, actor, member of Super Junior
- Young K – bassist, vocalist, rapper and member of Day6
- Qri – singer, actress, leader and member of T-ara and its sub-group QBS
- Song Ji-hyo – actress
- Yoon Doo-joon – singer, actor and member of Highlight
- Yuju – singer and former member of GFriend
- Park Ye-eun – singer and former Wonder Girls member
- Kihyun – singer and member of Monsta X
- Lee Sung-kyung - model and actress and singer
- Kim Si-eun - actress

== International relations ==
=== Twin towns – sister cities ===
Goyang is twinned with:

- Hakodate, Japan (2011)
- Heerhugowaard, Netherlands (1997)
- Eisenstadt, Austria (2012)
- Loudoun County, United States (2013)
- Maui County, United States (2012)
- Qiqihar, China (1998)
- San Bernardino, United States (2003)
- Uljin, South Korea
- Yeonggwang, South Korea
- Sinan, South Korea
- Gimhae, South Korea
- Buan, South Korea
- Jecheon, South Korea
- Asan, South Korea

=== Friendship cities ===
- Aguascalientes City, Mexico (2002)
- Binzhou, China (2006)
- Dundgovi Province, Mongolia (2009)
- Kunming, China (2001)
- Sabadell, Spain (2001)
- Virginia Beach, United States (2005)
- Yanji, China (2007)
- Taguig, Philippines (2023)

== Administrative districts ==
- Ilsanseo District
- Ilsandong District
- Deogyang District

== See also ==
- List of cities in South Korea
- Geography of South Korea
- Seoul National Capital Area
- Goyang Geumjeong Cave Massacre
