= Ilsanseo District =

District of Goyang, South Korea

- Non-autonomous District
- Interactive map of Ilsanseo District
- Country: South Korea
- Region: Sudogwon (Gijeon)
- Province: Gyeonggi
- City: Goyang
- Administrative divisions: 9 dong

Population
  - Dialect: Seoul
- Website: Ilsanseo District Office

Korean name
- Hangul: 일산서구
- Hanja: 一山西區
- RR: Ilsanseo-gu
- MR: Ilsansŏ-gu

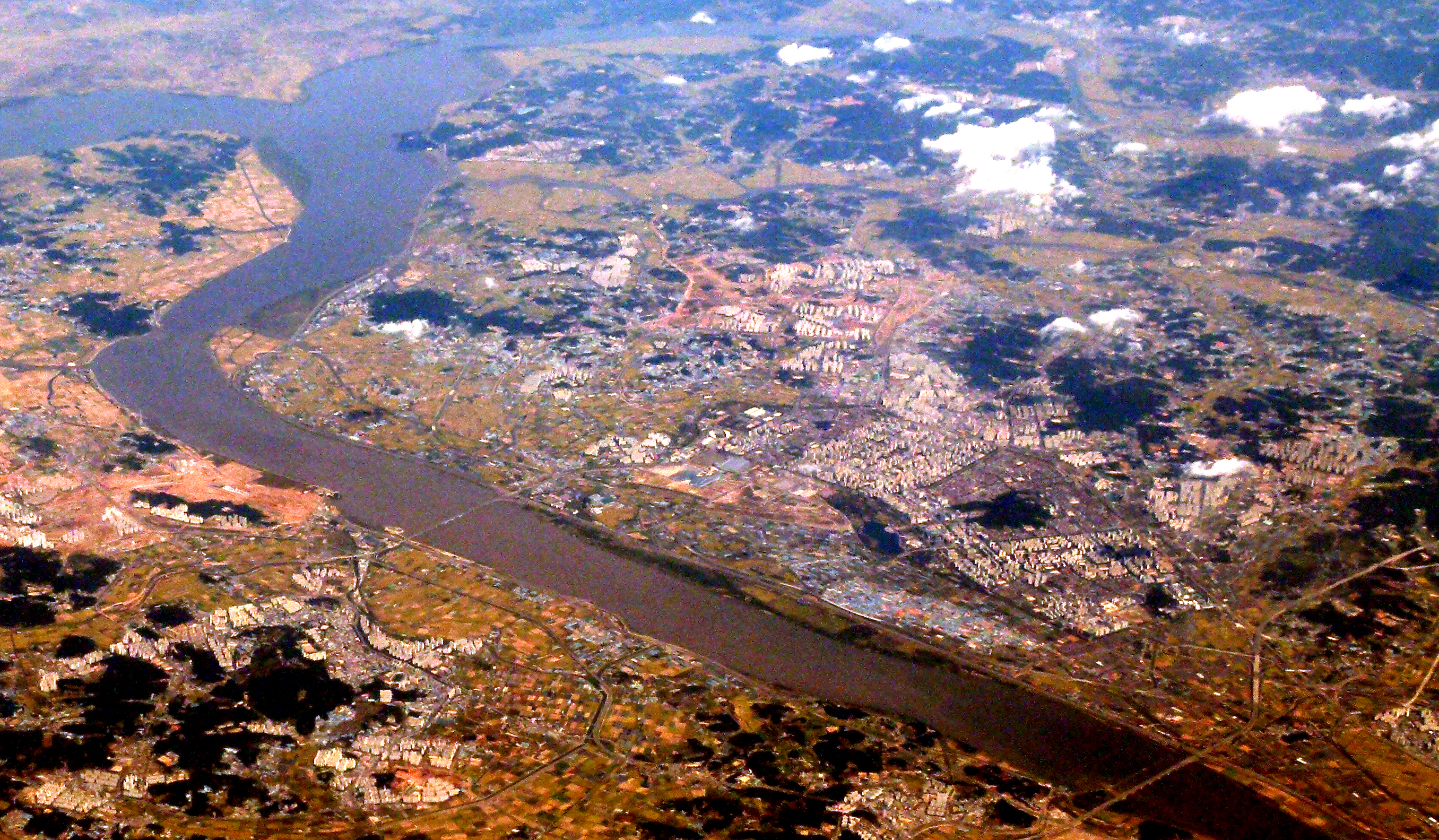
Bird's-eye view of Ilsan Seo-gu of Goyang city

Ilsanseo District (Korean: 일산서구; lit. 'West Ilsan District') is a district in Goyang, Gyeonggi-do, South Korea. Ilsan-gu was divided into Ilsandong District and Ilsanseo District on May 16, 2005.

It is a district located in the western part of Goyang-si, Gyeonggi-do. It has an area of 42.15 km^{2} and is divided into Ilsandong-gu to the east and Ilsanseo-gu to the west, centered on Gobong-ro, which connects Jungsan and Hosu Park. It borders Paju-si to the north and Gimpo-si to the west across the Han River.

== Administration ==
Ilsanseo District is divided into 9 dong (동, "neighborhoods"):

- Ilsan 1(il), 2(i) and 3(sam)-dong (일산1, 2, 3동)
- Tanhyeon-dong (탄현동)
- Juyeop 1(il) and 2(i)-dong (주엽1, 2동)
- Daehwa-dong (대화동)
- Songpo-dong (송포동) [contain Beopgot-dong (법곳동)]
- Songsan-dong (송산동) [divided into Gusan-dong and Gajwa-dong (구산동, 가좌동)]
- Deogi-dong (덕이동)

== Education ==
Ilsanseo District has 46 schools including: 22 elementary schools, 12 middle schools, 9 high schools, and 2 special schools.

Hugok (후곡) is notable for their hagwons (학원, "cram school"), and many hagwons are present in the region.

== Living environment ==
To improve the living environment of ordinary citizens, 1,800 private rental housing units are scheduled to be built in Deok-i-dong.
