= Goyang International Flower Festival =

Flower festival in South Korea

Coordinates: 37.658°N 126.764°E

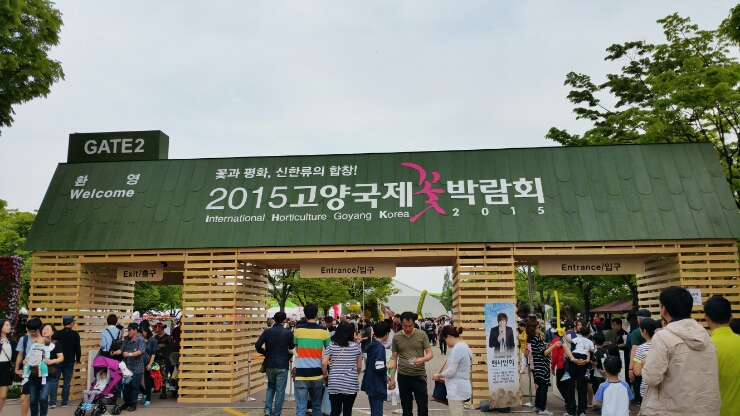
Main Entrance

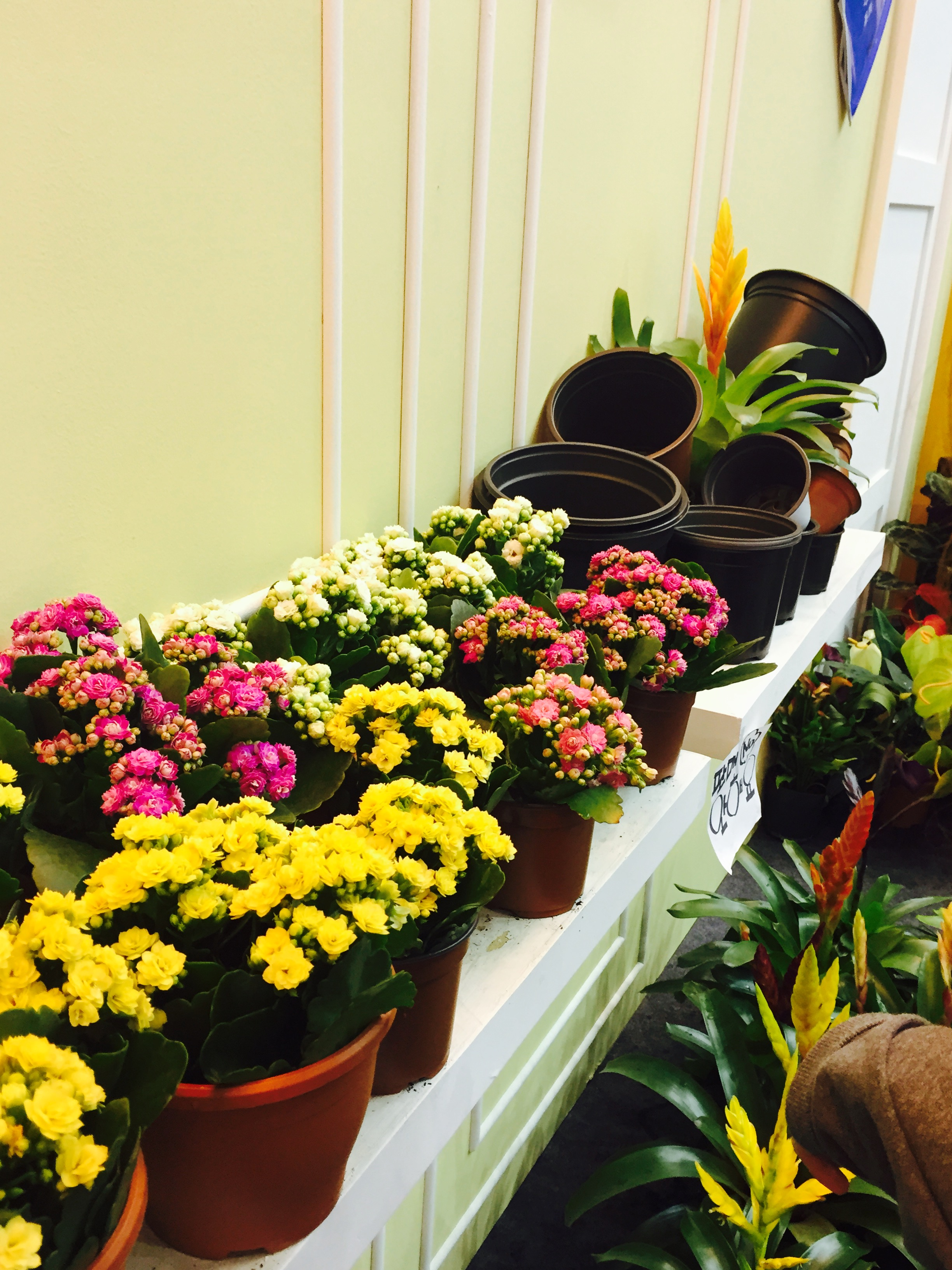
Flowers in Goyang International Flower Festival

The Goyang International Flower Festival (Korean: 고양 국제 꽃박람회; RR: Goyang Gukje Kkotbangamhoe) is one of the largest flower festivals in South Korea and takes place in the city of Goyang. It attracts many visitors annually. The festival is held in a metropolitan area and serves as a model for local culture festivals, in which some foreign flower farmers participate.

During the festival, flower events and cultural performances are held, and visitors can buy flowers from all over the world, which helps promote the domestic flower industry.

In 2015, the festival was held from 24 April to 10 May at Ilsan Lake Park. The 2015 festival was the largest to that date, consisting of 25 national pavilions, 120 companies from 35 countries, and 200 domestic companies. The exhibition occupied 150,000 square metres (1,600,000 sq ft); it was organized by the Goyang International Flower Foundation.

Sustainability and ESG Campaigns Recent editions have integrated environmental ESG (Environmental, Social, and Governance) values. In partnership with the Korea Arboreta and Gardens Institute, the 2026 festival launched a public campaign to support the restoration of forests damaged by wildfires, allowing visitors to participate directly in environmental recovery efforts.

== History ==
The festival started as Goyang Korea Flower Show in 1991, and was held as an annual, domestic event until 1996. From 1997 to 2012, the Goyang International Flower Festival was held every three years. Since 2013, it returned to being held annually. It has since attracted 5.7 million people and has grown into one of the most famous international flower festivals in Korea.

=== Timeline ===
- In 1991, the 1st Goyang Korea Flower Show was held.
- In 1997, the 1st Goyang International Flower Festival was held.
- In 2012, the 6th Goyang International Flower Festival was held.
- In 2013, the 7th Goyang International Flower Festival was held.
- In 2014, the 8th Goyang International Flower Festival was held.
- In 2015, the 9th Goyang International Flower Festival was held from 24 April to 10 May.
- In 2016, the 10th Goyang International Flower Festival was held.
- In 2017, the 11th Goyang International Flower Festival was held.
- In 2018, the 12th Goyang International Flower Festival was held from 27 April to 13 May.
- In 2019, the 13th Goyang International Flower Festival was held from 26 April to 12 May.
- In 2022, the 14th Goyang International Flower Festival was held from 22 April to 26 April.
- In 2023, the 15th Goyang International Flower Festival was held from 27 April to 8 May.
- In 2026, the 18th Goyang International Flower Festival was held from 24 April to 10 May.

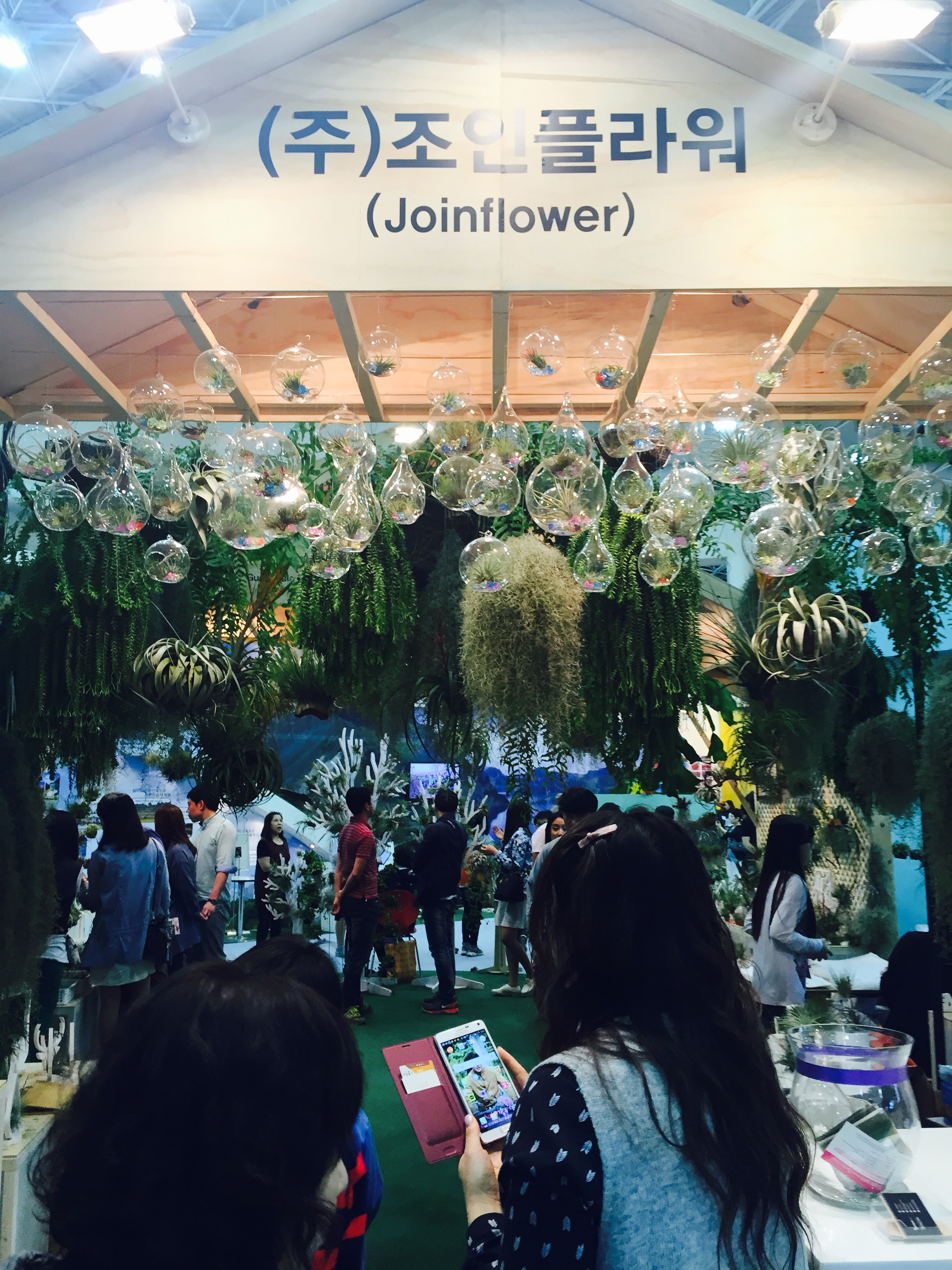
Flower Convention

== Events ==
In 2015, official events, such as the press day for the Goyang International Flower Festival opening ceremony, took place on 23 April. Business days were from 24 April to 10 May. The closing ceremony occurred on the last day of the event, 10 May.

Indoors, people from overseas governments, and internal and international enterprises and associations, hold event booths. Outdoors, there are various types of gardens, including the Mosaic Culture Garden, the Korea Garden Show, the Flower Tunnel, the Healing Garden, the Children's Garden and the Flower Wall.

Events and programs for attendees, some related to flowers and some related to traditional culture, include the Traditional Flower Arrangement Contest, the Flower Drawing Contest, a Flower Boat Ride, and events where visitors can wear traditional clothing or make items including soap, pots or artificial flowers.

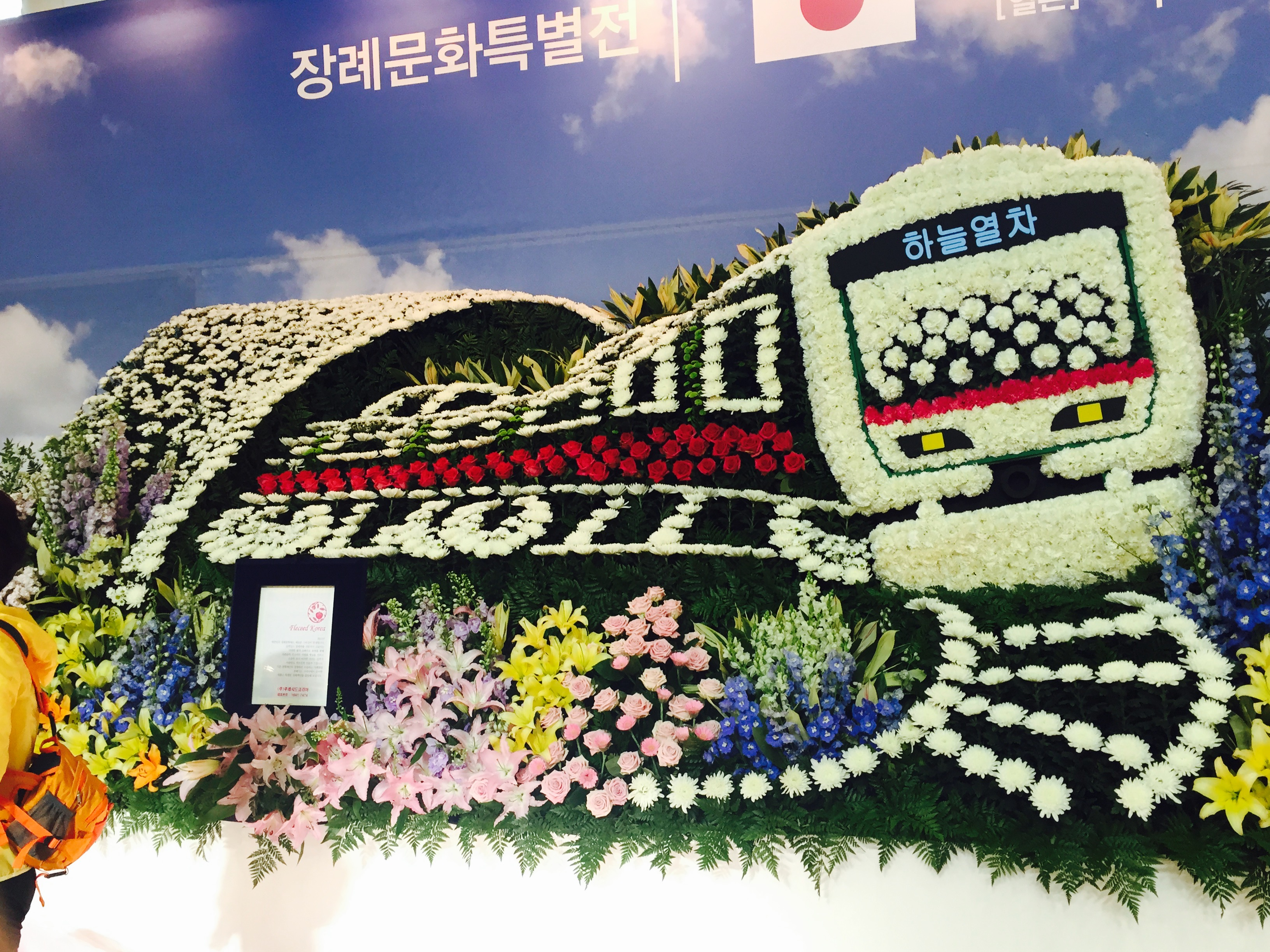
Flower Works

Each year, the festival has produced many programs with both domestic and foreign cooperation. In 2015, the program consisted of an indoor exhibition and an outdoor garden. At programs called Exchanges of World Flowers, new varieties of flowers are exhibited by international and local flower firms. Foreign buyers are introduced to local florists.

The 2018 Goyang International Flower Expo presents the latest trends in the world's flower industry by participating in over 320 flower-related organizations, organizations and companies from 36 countries with the theme "New Flower World to Change the World." There are rare plants that are not easily seen, indoor gardens decorated with floral arts, colorful outdoor theme gardens, flower culture experience programs, rich performances and events, and flower shops sold directly by farmers. From Friday to Sunday and holiday nights, the flower gardens create a romantic atmosphere.

Dual AIPH Certification (World First)

In 2026, the festival foundation announced that it had become the first in the world to receive dual approval from the International Association of Horticultural Producers (AIPH) for both the International Horticultural Exhibition and the International Horticultural Trade Fair categories. This certification solidifies its status as a premier global hub for both public tourism and professional industry exchange.

2026 Theme: "Flowers, Coloring Time" The 18th edition (2026) introduced the theme "Flowers, Coloring Time" (꽃, 시간을 물들이다), which utilizes a "time-traveling" concept to connect the past, present, and future of horticultural design. The central landmark for this edition is the "Time Traveler’s Garden," featuring a 10-meter-tall clock sculpture made entirely of blooming flowers.

== Effect ==
=== 2015 ===
With various business programs, Goyang International Flower Festival brought in 33 million won through export contracts and signed an export contract more than $30 million for four consecutive years. Flower markets in Goyang negotiated an export contract worth more than $14 million, which is 42% of the total contract amount. Over 550,000 guests visited the festival in 2015. The total number of visitors has increased about 20%. According to Shinhan University Industry-Academic Cooperation Foundation, the festival made a profit of about 71.1 billion won in 2015.

=== 2024 ===
The 2024 festival, themed "Flower in the Earth," attracted a total of 687,899 visitors over its 17-day run. According to an evaluation report by the Goyang City government, the event generated an economic ripple effect of approximately 112.9 billion KRW (approx. US$83 million).

=== Total ===
Since the festival became an international exhibition in 1997, it has attracted more than 5.7 million people domestically and internationally, and has also attained export contracts in the amount of about $200 million. It has opened new prospects for the developing local horticultural industry, and has been acknowledged as one of the best exhibitions in Korea. The Goyang International Flower Expo, held for the first time in 1997, has attracted more than 6.2 million visitors from Korea to the 12th flower exhibition in 2018, and has grown into an international flower exposition representing Korea.

== Venues ==
=== Ilsan Lake Park ===
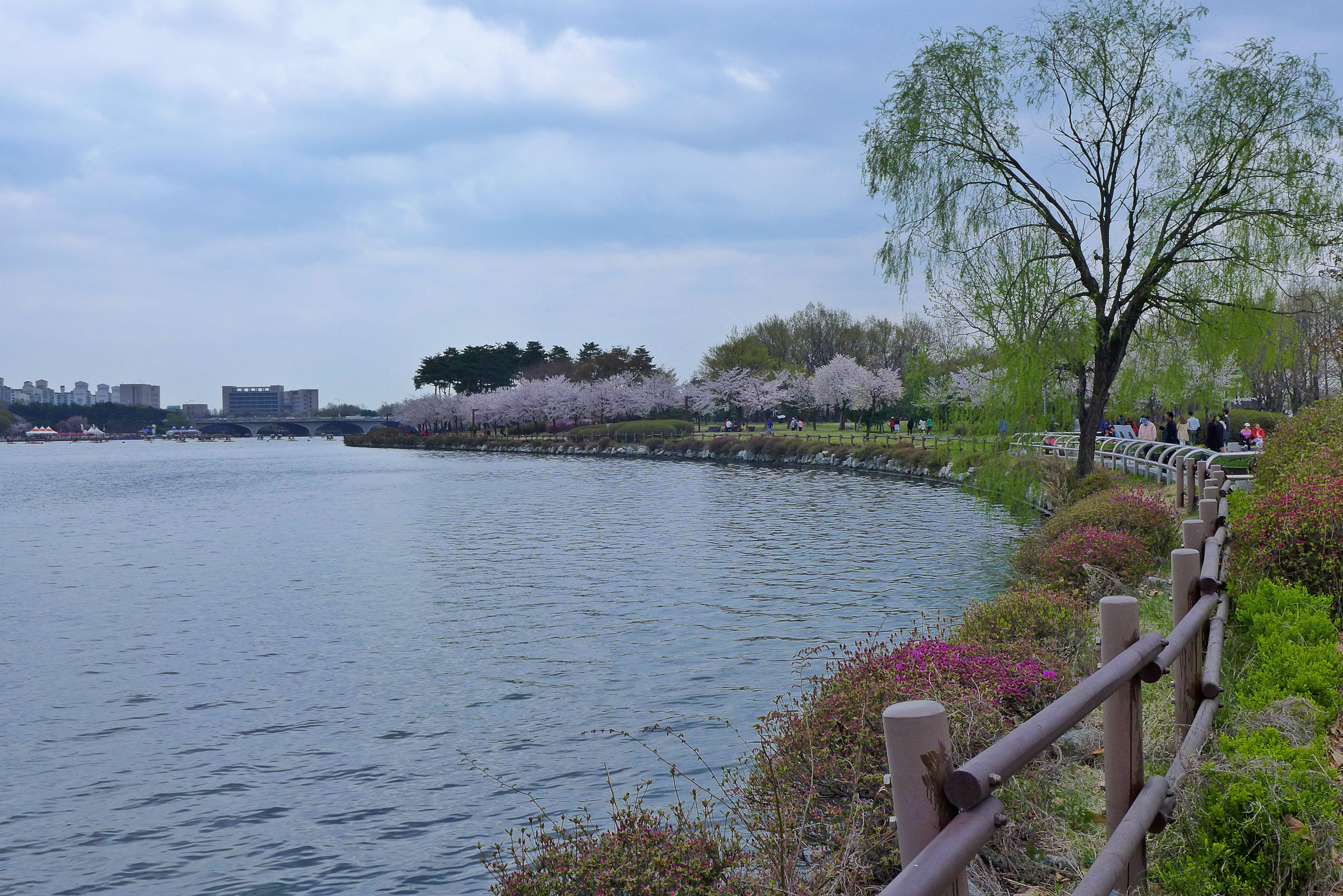
Ilsan Lake Park

Ilsan Lake Park is the largest artificial lake in East Asia. Visitors can follow the trail by riding a bicycle or enjoying weekend performances and shows.

=== Lafesta ===
Lafesta is the biggest street-themed shopping center and Korea's only UEC (Urban Entertainment Center) shopping mall. Lafesta (Ilsan Myeongdong) is an exclusive shopping center; its outlets include a movie theater, fashion outlets, a food court, a themed café, a game center, a record shop, a book shop and a beauty clinic.

=== Onemount ===
Onemount is a complex-cultural facility that has nine floors above ground and two underground. It is one of the biggest shopping centers in Goyang city. It consists of a water park, a snow park, shopping malls and a sports club. The water park and snow park are open everyday of the year. It contains 125 shopping outlets and is not far from Ilsan Lake Park and KINTEX.

== Gallery ==
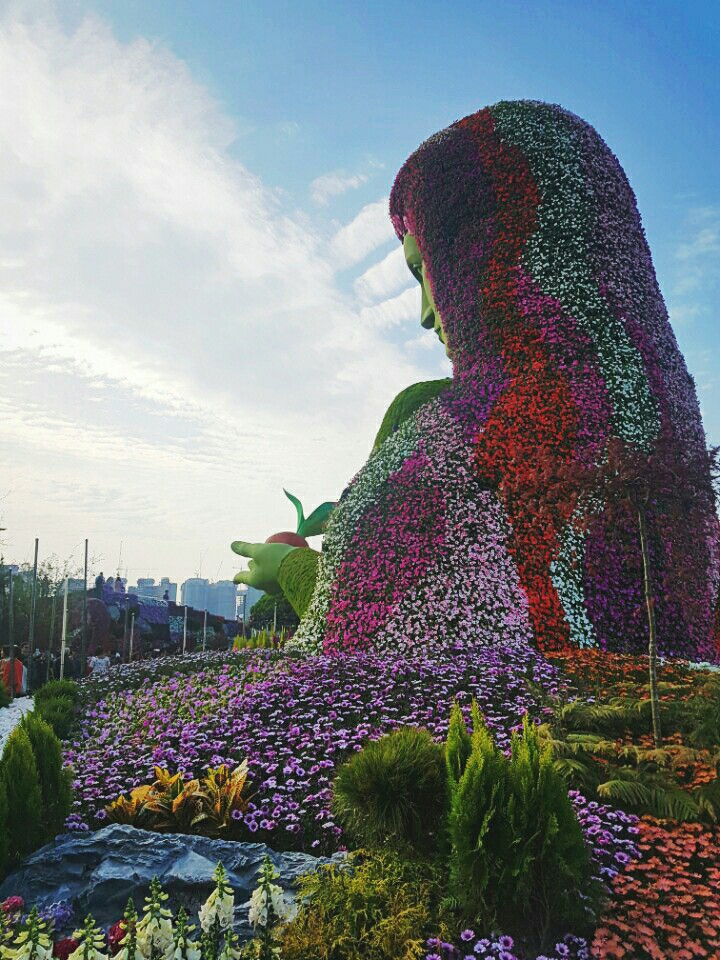
2018 Goyang International Flower Festival_outside garden

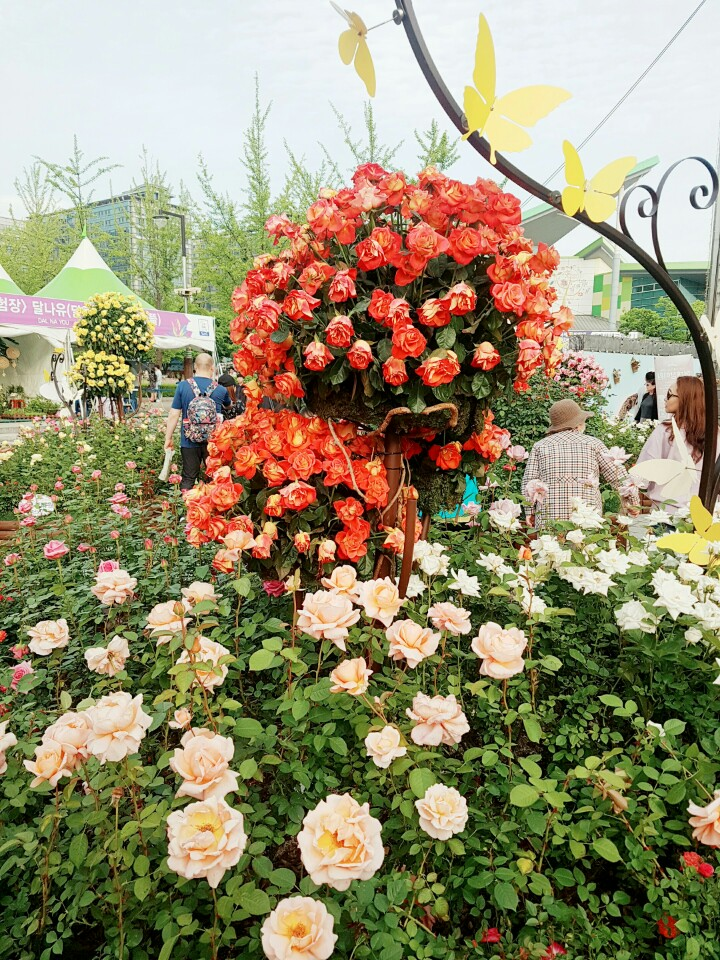
2018 Goyang International Flower Festival_outside garden

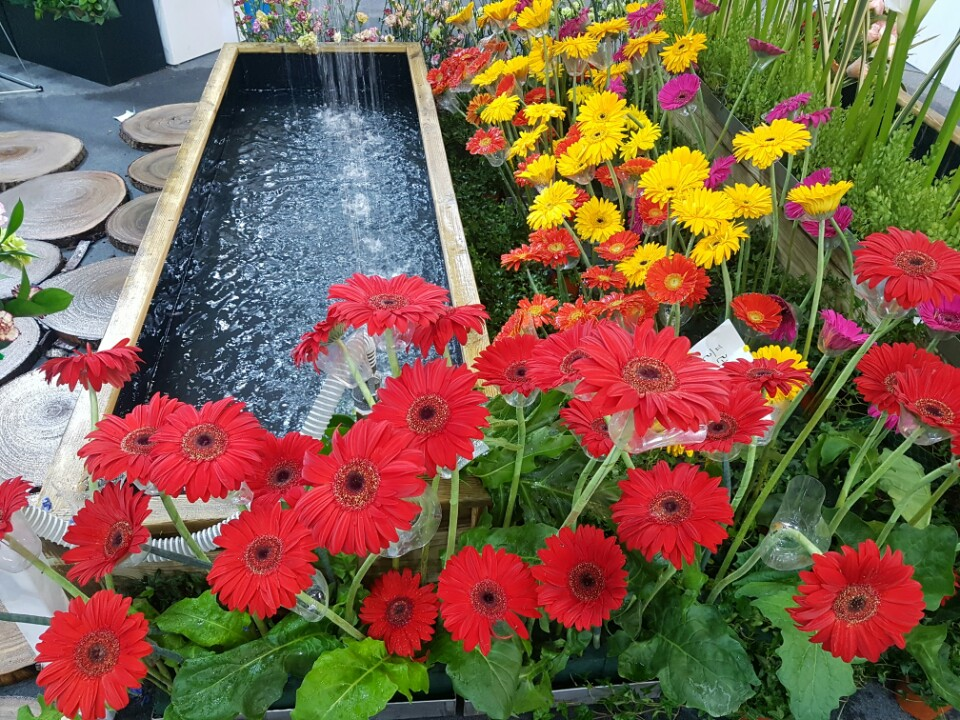
2018 Goyang International Flower Festival_outside garden

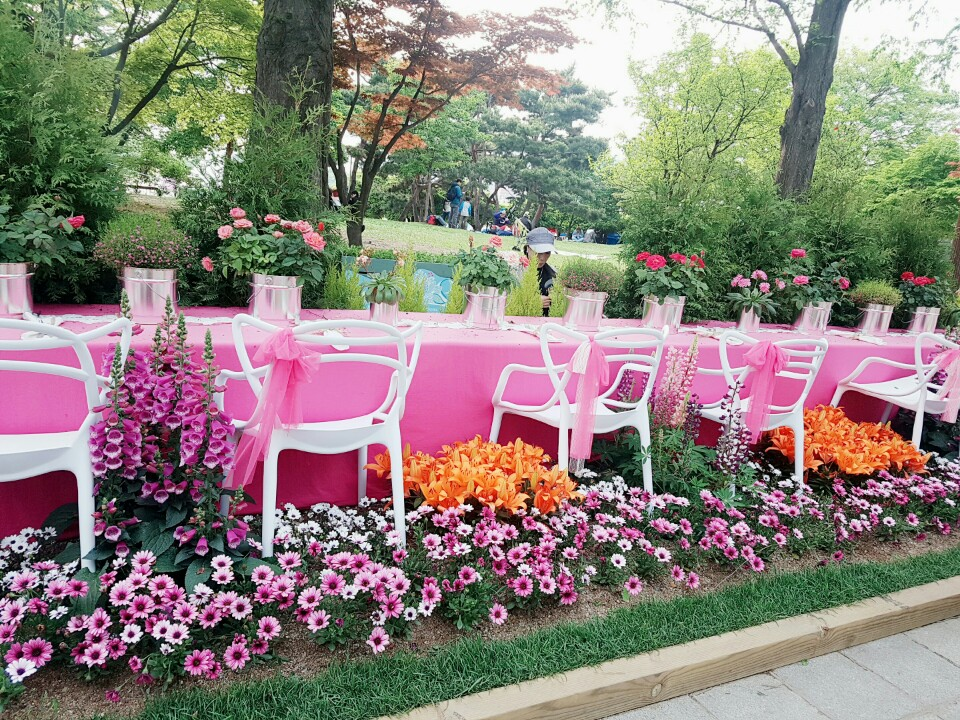
2018 Goyang International Flower Festival_outside garden

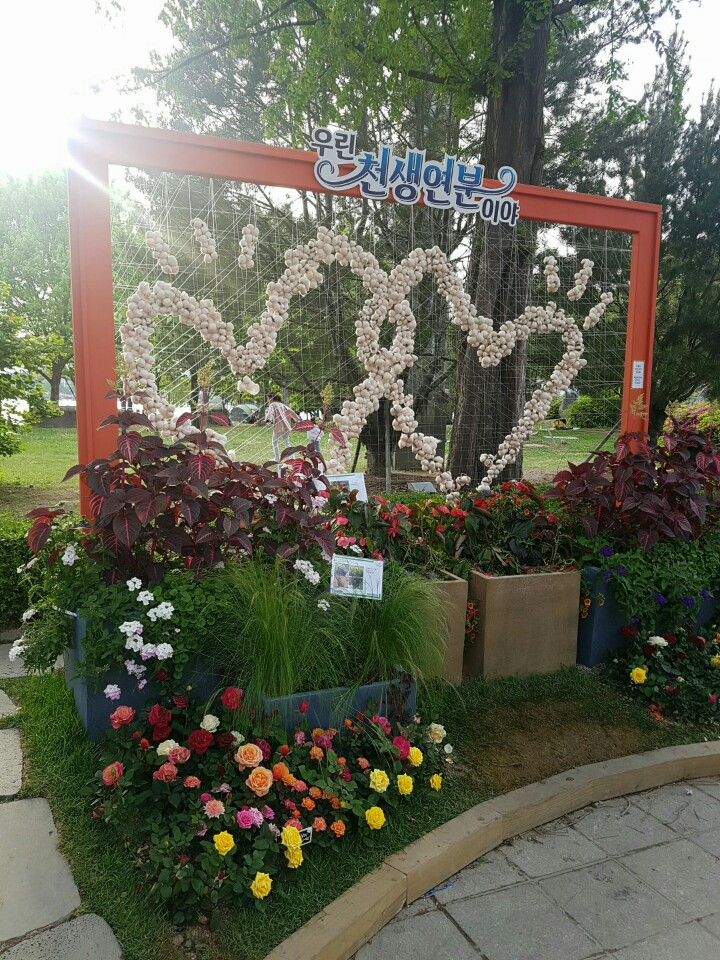
2018 Goyang International Flower Festival_photo zone

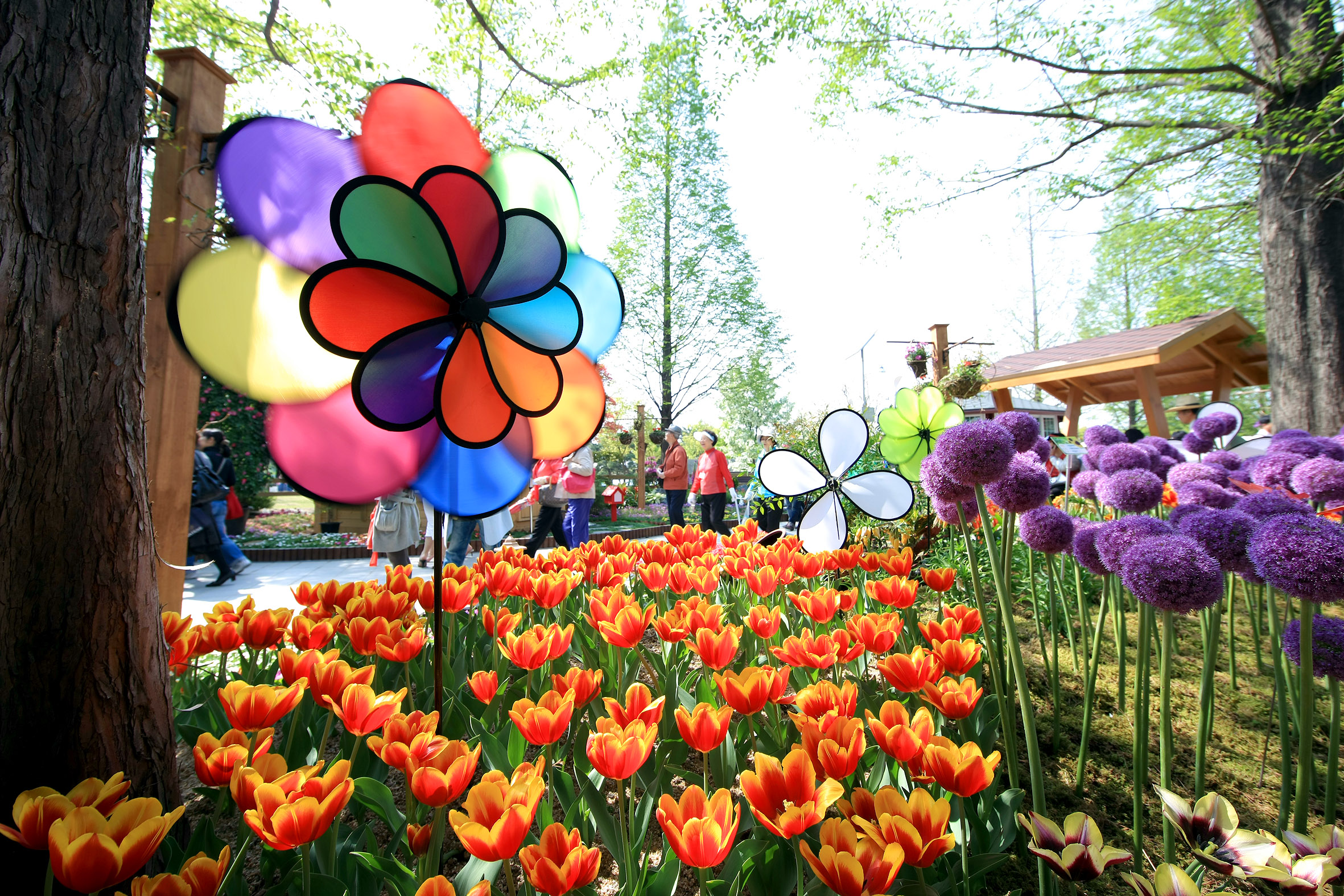
Flower street- Goyang International Flower Festival

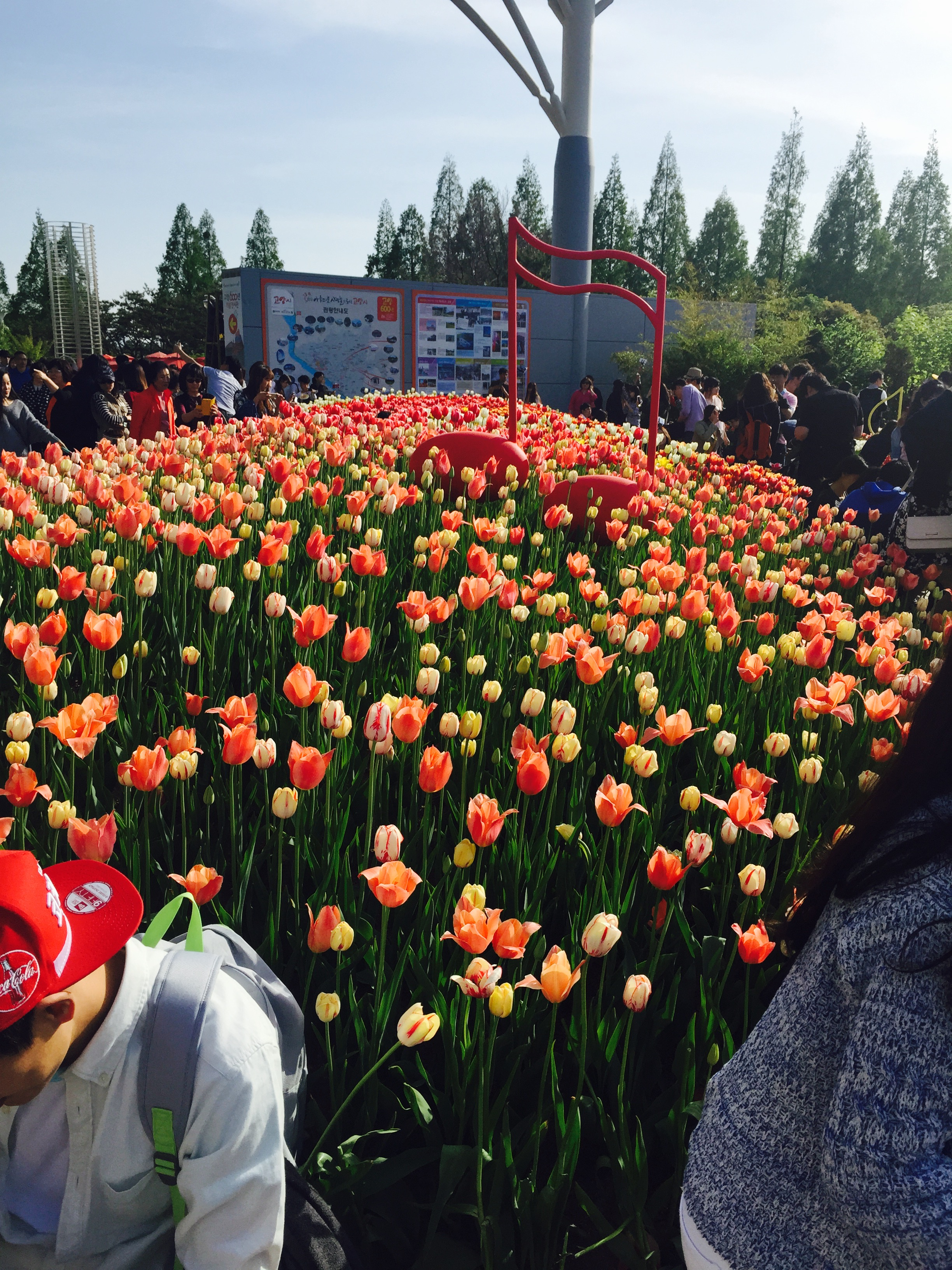
Goyang International Flower Festival

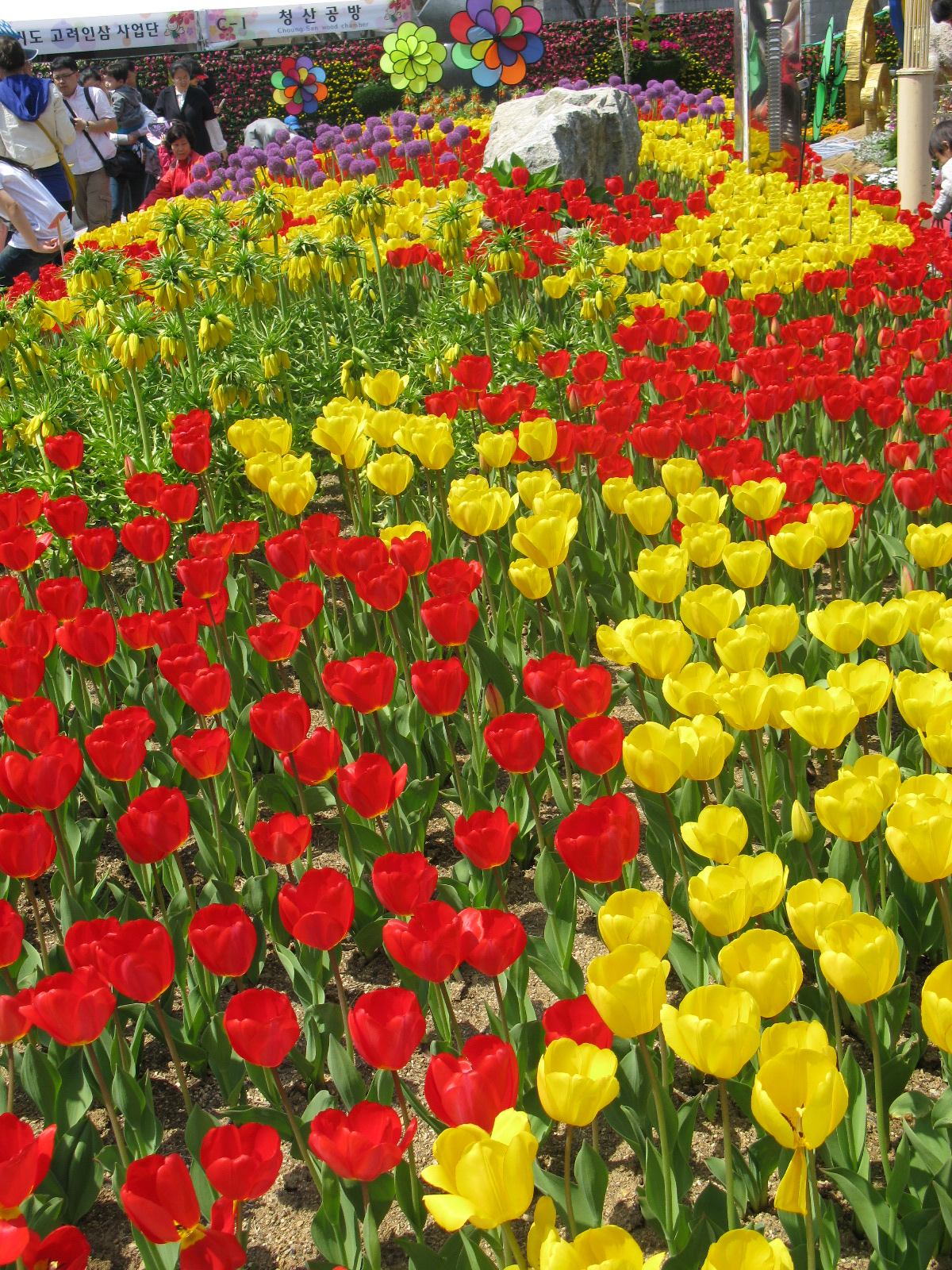
Flower street- Goyang International Flower Festival

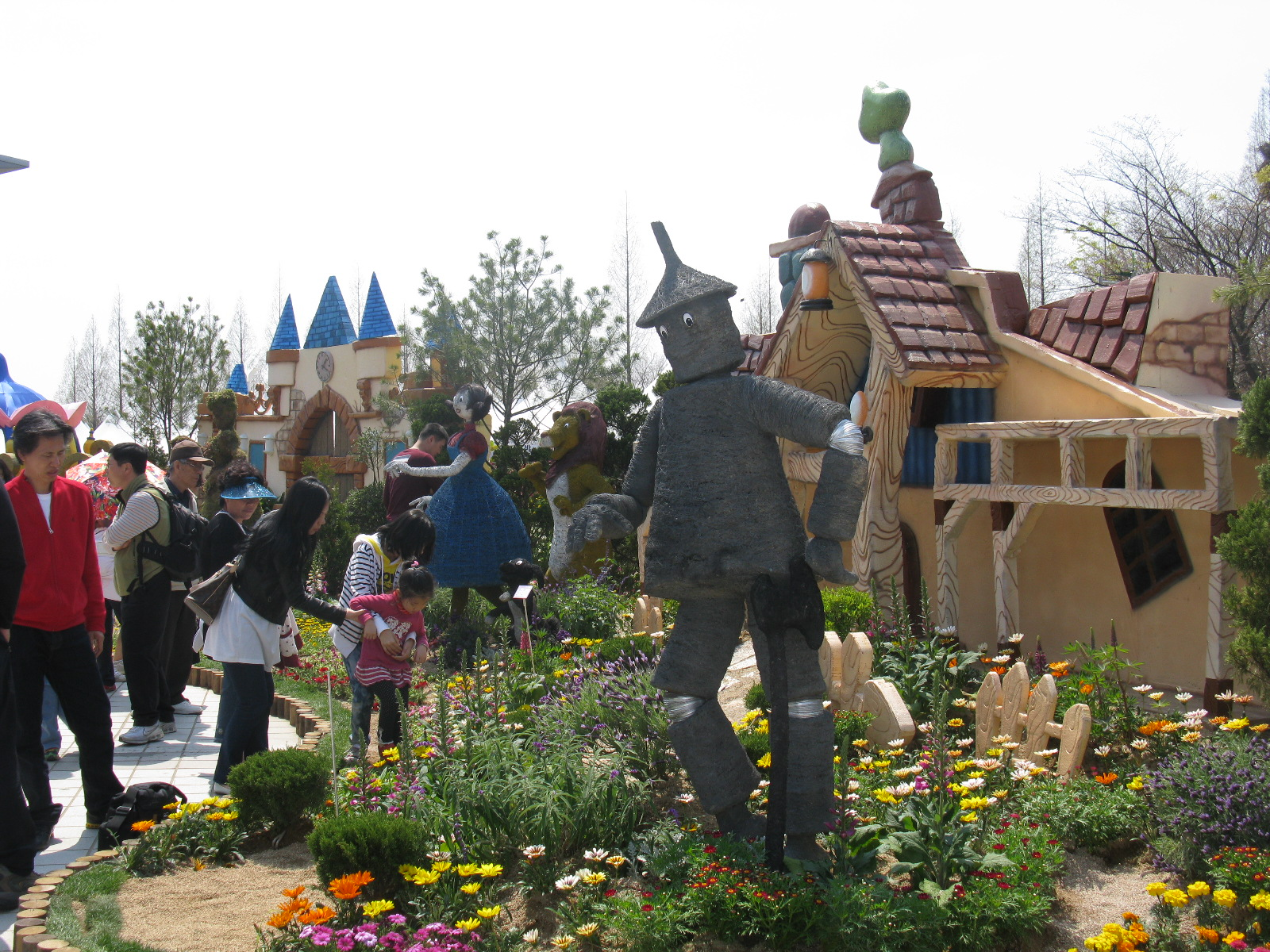
Outdoor village- Goyang International Flower Festival

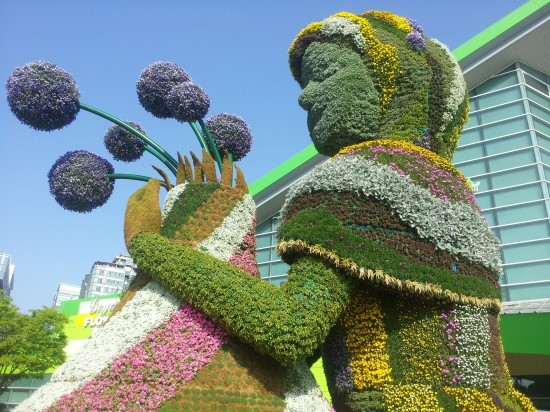
2015 Goyang International Flower Festival

== See also ==
- Modern Korean festivals
- List of festivals in South Korea
- List of festivals in Asia
