= List of Gaon Album Chart number ones of 2013 =

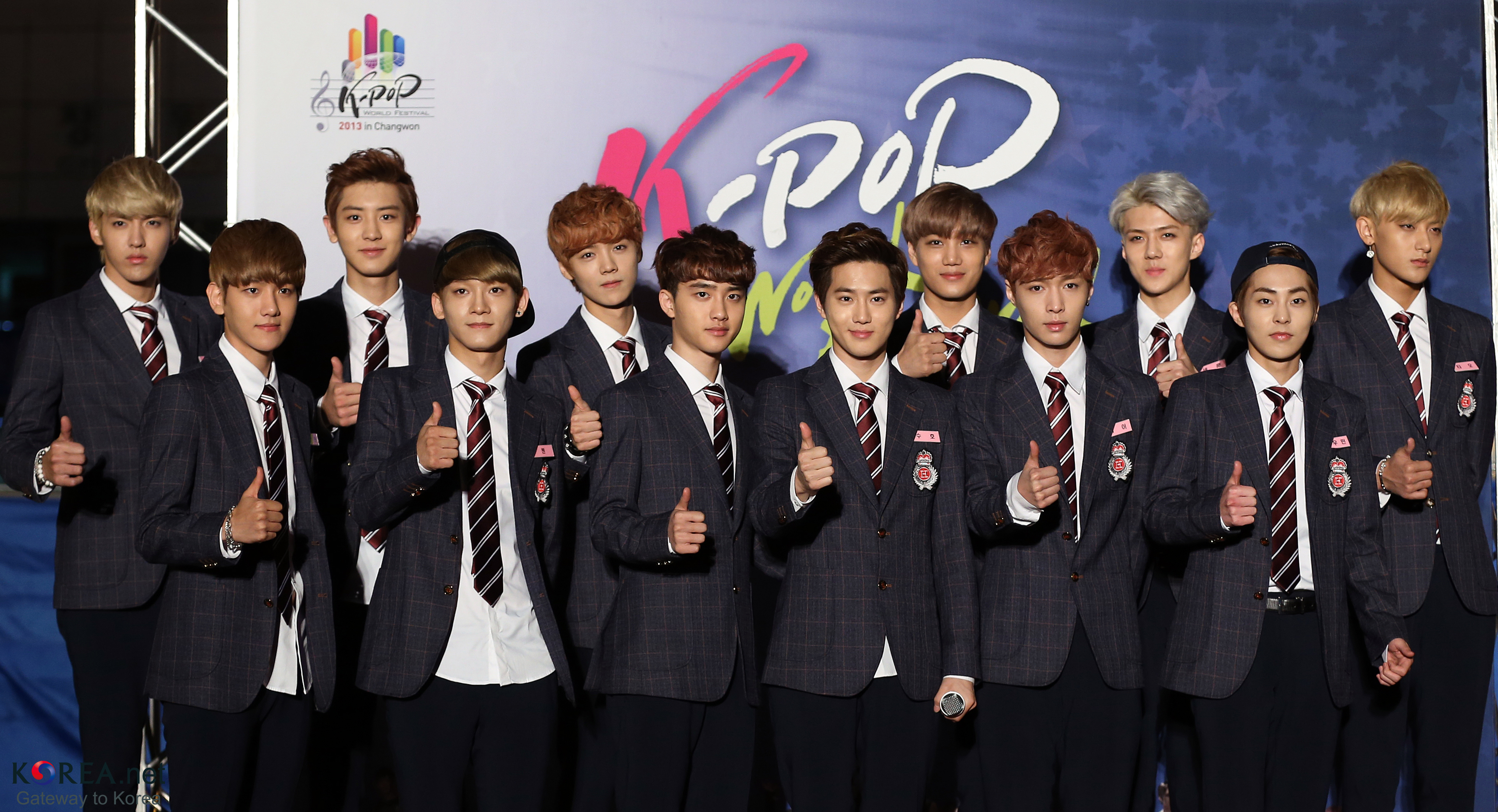
Exo's XOXO Repackage (Korean Version) album was Gaon's best selling album of 2013.

The Gaon Album Chart is a record chart that ranks the best-selling albums and EPs in South Korea. It is part of the Gaon Music Chart which launched in February 2010. The data for the chart is compiled by the Ministry of Culture, Sports and Tourism and the Korean Music Content Industry Association based on weekly and monthly physical album sales by major distributors such as LOEN Entertainment, KT Music, Sony Music Korea, Warner Music Korea, Universal Music and Mnet Media.

Overall, EXO's XOXO Repackage (Korean Version) was Gaon's best selling album of 2013, selling 335,823 copies.

== Weekly charts ==
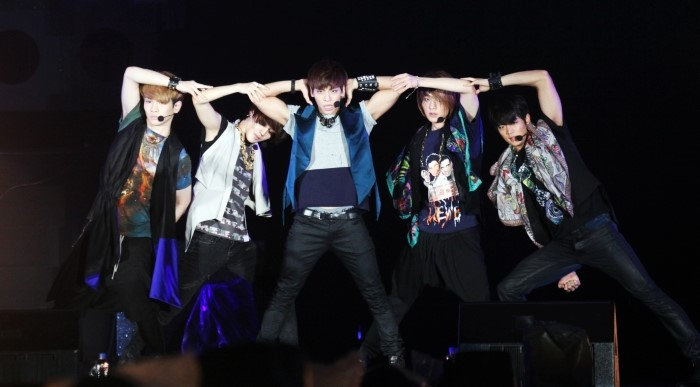
Shinee (pictured) topped the weekly chart six times with three different albums.

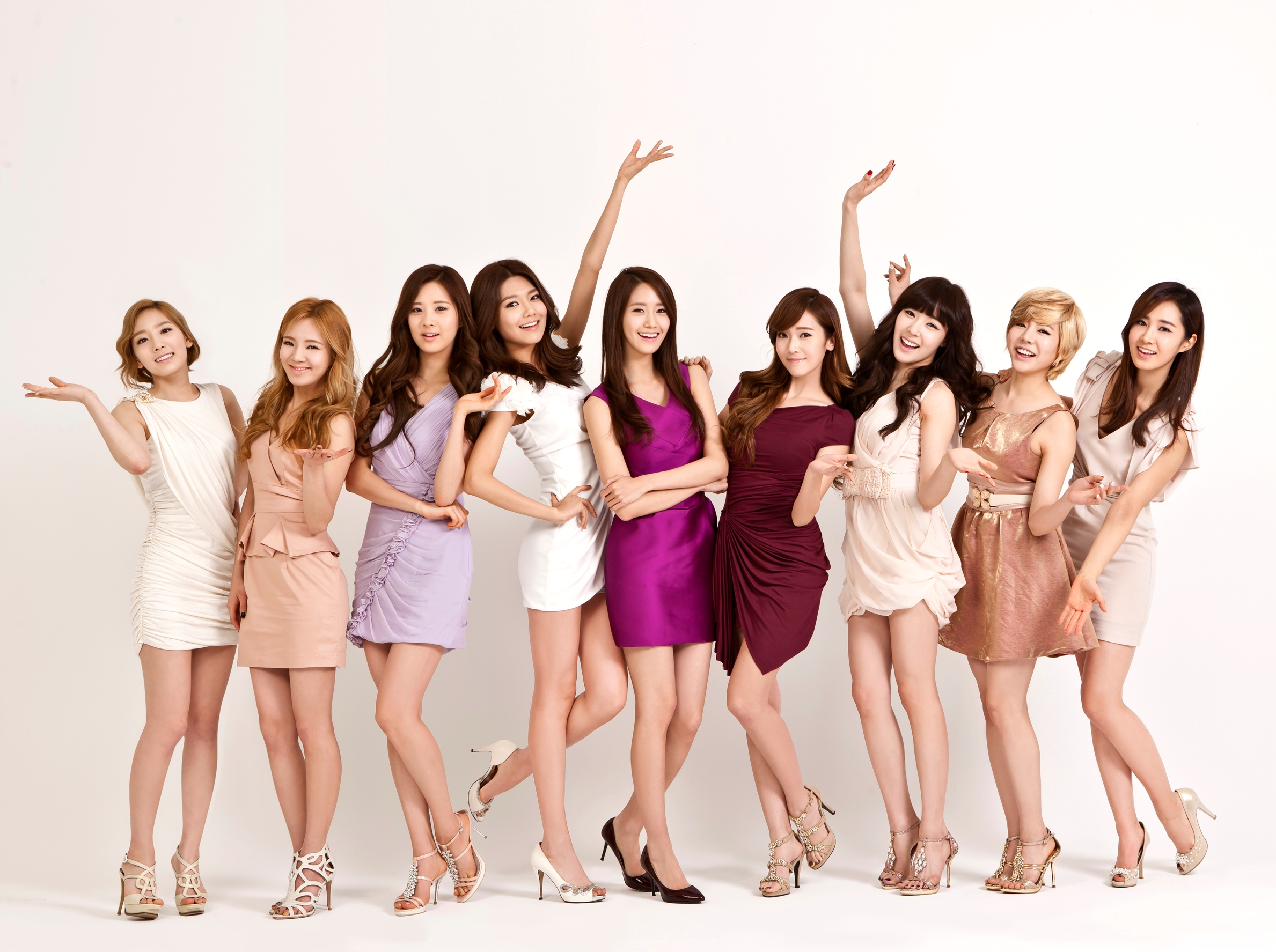
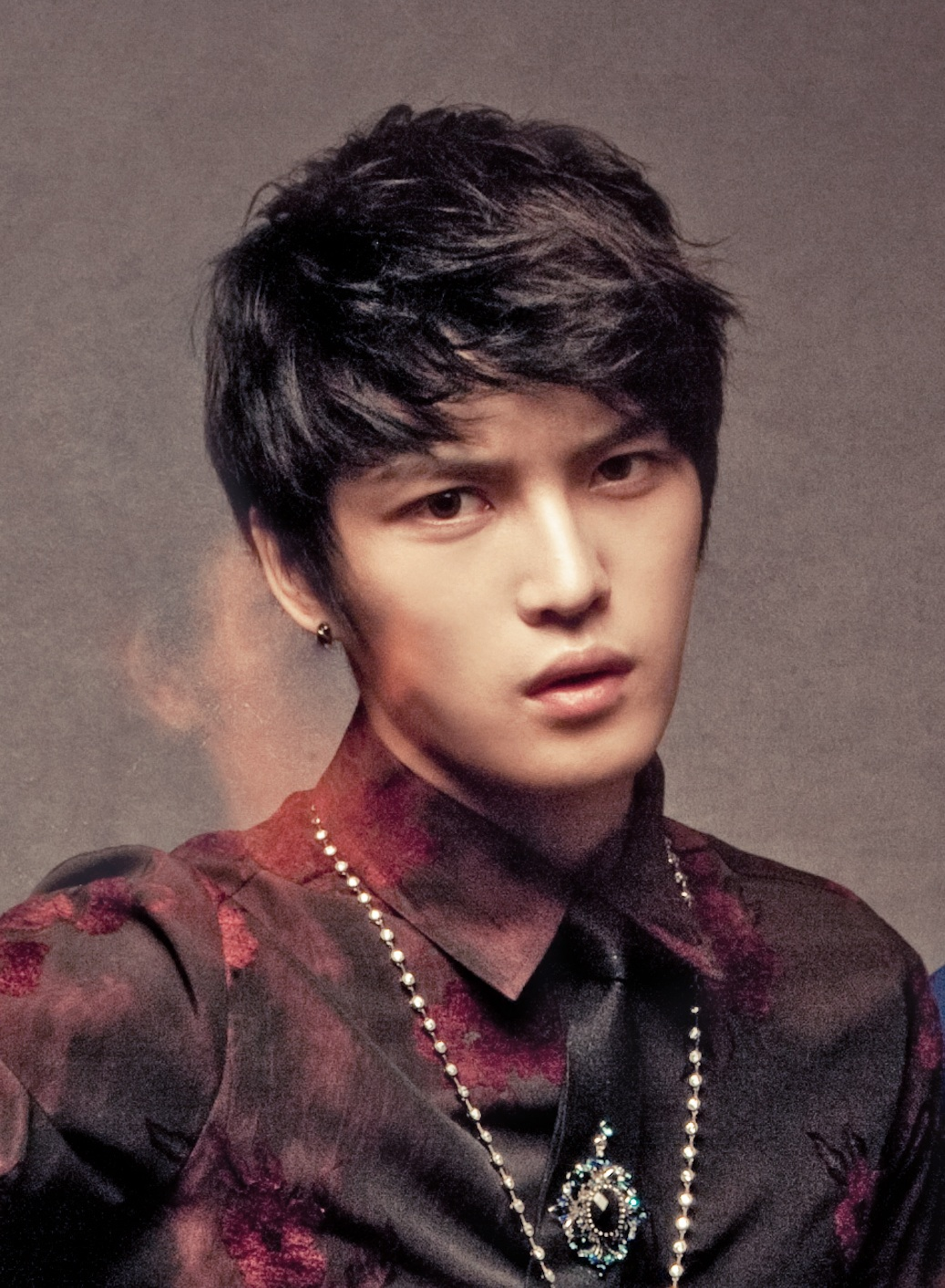
Girls' Generation (top) and Jaejoong (bottom) topped the weekly album chart four times each.

Week	Album	Artist	Ref.
December 29, 2012 (Note: This week was counted as the first week of 2013 by Gaon Music Chart.)	Les Misérables: Highlights from the Motion Picture Soundtrack	Various Artist	
January 5	I Got a Boy	Girls' Generation	
January 12	I Got a Boy	Girls' Generation	
January 19	I	Jaejoong	
January 26	I Got a Boy	Girls' Generation	
February 2	Re:Blue	CNBlue	
February 9	Re:Blue	CNBlue	
February 16	Promise You	Super Junior-K.R.Y	
February 23	Chapter 1. Dream Girl – The Misconceptions of You	Shinee	
March 2	Y	Jaejoong	
March 9	Chapter 1. Dream Girl – The Misconceptions of You	Shinee	
March 16	Life	Heo Young Saeng	
March 23	Chapter 1. Dream Girl – The Misconceptions of You	Shinee	
March 30	New Challenge	Infinite	
April 6	New Challenge	Infinite	
April 13	2011 Girls' Generation Tour	Girls' Generation	
April 20	Shaking Heart	C-Clown	
April 27	Hello	Cho Yong Pil	
May 4	Chapter 2. Why So Serious? – The Misconceptions of Me	Shinee	
May 11	What's Happening?	B1A4	
May 18	Grown	2PM	
May 25	Grown	2PM	
June 1	Alive Galaxy Tour 2013: The Final in Seoul	Big Bang	
June 8	XOXO (Korean Version)	Exo	
June 15	Sexy Beat	MBLAQ	
June 22	XOXO (Korean Version)	Exo	
June 29	Grown (Grand Edition)	2PM	
July 6	Inner Child	John Park	
July 13	1st Mini Album	My Name	
July 20	Destiny	Infinite	
July 27	Hard to Love, How to Love	Beast	
August 3	Pink Tape	f(x)	
August 10	XOXO Repackage (Korean Version)	Exo	
August 17	XOXO Repackage (Korean Version)	Exo	
August 24	Let's Talk About Love	Seungri	
August 31	Let's Talk About Love	Seungri	
September 7	Full Bloom	Kara	
September 14	Coup D'Etat	G-Dragon	
September 21	XOXO Repackage (Korean Version)	Exo	
September 28	Busker Busker 2nd Album	Busker Busker	
October 5	Very Good	Block B	
October 12	Modern Times	IU	
October 19	Everybody	Shinee	
October 26	Everybody	Shinee	
November 2	WWW	Jaejoong	
November 9	WWW	Jaejoong	
November 16	Teen Top Class Addition	Teen Top	
November 23	The Mood	F.T. Island	
November 30	Voodoo	VIXX	
December 7	XOXO Repackage (Korean Version)	Exo	
December 14	Miracles in December (Korean Version)	Exo	
December 21	Miracles in December (Korean Version)	Exo	

== Monthly charts ==
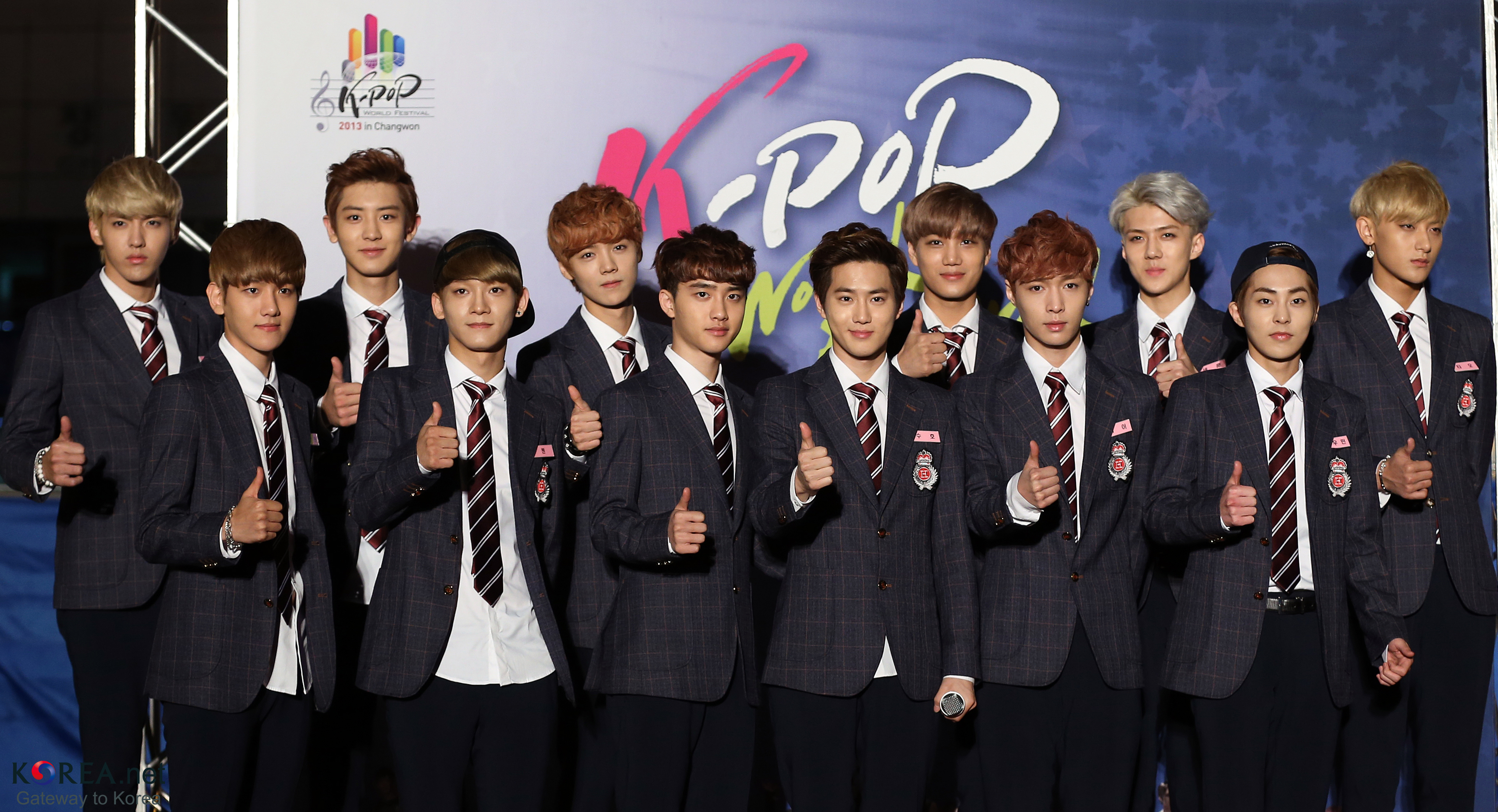
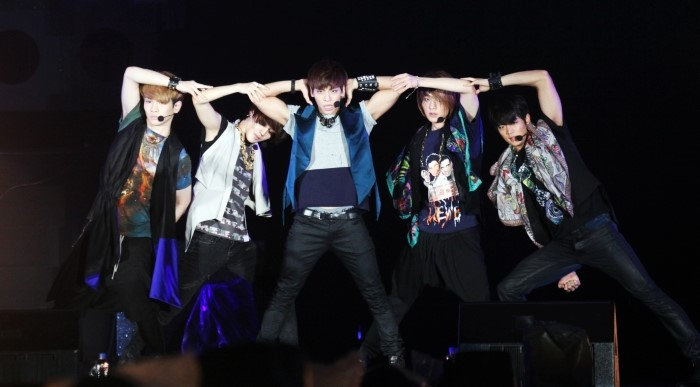
Exo (top) and Shinee (bottom) had three monthly number-one albums each, more than any other act.

Month	Album	Artist	Sales
January	I Got a Boy	Girls' Generation	265,322
February	Chapter 1. Dream Girl – The Misconceptions of You	Shinee	137,444
March	New Challenge	Infinite	138,431
April	Chapter 2. Why So Serious? – The Misconceptions of Me	Shinee	106,404
May	Hello	Cho Yong-pil	167,323
June	XOXO (Korean Version)	Exo	206,812
July	Destiny	Infinite	158,462
August	XOXO Repackage (Korean Version)	Exo	186,281
September	Coup d'Etat	G-Dragon	198,489
October	Everybody	Shinee	122,284
November	Voodoo	VIXX	43,070
December	Miracles in December (Korean Version)	Exo	262,825
