= Born Gene =

- Digital cover

Studio album by Kim Jae-joong
- Released: September 13, 2022
- Genre: K-pop
- Length: 32:48
- Language: Korean
- Label: C-JeS Entertainment

Kim Jae-joong Korean studio albums chronology
No.X (2016)	Born Gene (2022)	Flower Garden (2024)

Singles from Born Gene
- 1. "Nobody Like You" Released: September 13, 2022

Born Gene is the third Korean-language and sixth overall studio album by South Korean singer Kim Jae-joong, released on September 13, 2022, through C-JeS Entertainment. It includes the lead single "Nobody Like You" and is Kim's first Korean-language album in six years, following 2016's No.X. The album debuted at number five on the Korean Circle Album Chart. Kim toured Asia in support of the record from September 17 to October 8, 2022.

== Background ==
The album is Kim's first full Korean-language album in six years. Kim stated that he intended Born Gene to have tracks that "make everyone excited like they're at a festival, the moment they first hear" them. He also co-wrote the songs "Locking Love" and "Broken Mirror".

== Commercial performance ==
Born Gene debuted at number five on the Circle Album Chart with first-week sales of 47,359 in South Korea. It also debuted at number 13 on the Japanese Oricon Albums Chart, with 2,920 physical sales there in its first week.

== Track listing ==
Born Gene track listing
No.	Title	Length
1.	"Nobody Like You"	3:00
2.	"Tick-Tack" (featuring Zuho of SF9)	3:05
3.	"BPM"	3:13
4.	"I Want to Ask You" (묻고싶다)	4:34
5.	"Locking Love"	3:55
6.	"Broken Mirror"	4:22
7.	"Walking on Water"	3:44
8.	"In the Rain"	3:55
9.	"Nobody Like You" (instrumental)	3:00
Total length:		32:48

== Charts ==
Chart performance for Born Gene
Chart (2022)	Peak position
Japanese Albums (Oricon)	13
Japanese Hot Albums (Billboard Japan)	13
South Korean Albums (Circle)	5
