= I (Kim Jae-joong EP) =

EP by Kim Jaejoong
- Released: 17 January 2013
- Recorded: 2012
- Genre: Rock
- Language: Korean
- Label: C-JeS; A&G Modes
- Producer: Lee Chung Bok; Kim Jaejoong

Kim Jaejoong chronology
I (2013)	WWW (2013)

Singles from I
- 1. "One Kiss" Released: 8 January 2013; 2. "Mine" Released: 17 January 2013

I is the first solo mini-album of South Korean singer Kim Jaejoong, a member of pop group JYJ. The EP was released on 17 January 2013 and is composed of rock songs, two of which were composed by Kim Ba-da from the rock band Sinawe. One of the songs, "나만의 위로" (Healing for Myself), was a soundtrack from the film Code Name: Jackal, which starred Jaejoong and Song Ji-hyo. The album was an immediate commercial success, with all 120,000 initial copies of the album selling out within two weeks. An additional 20,000 copies manufactured to cope with the high demand were similarly sold out. A repackaged edition titled Y, which includes two new tracks and two instrumental tracks, was released on 26 February 2013 and experienced similar success, with all 50,000 initial pressings of the album selling out within 24 hours of sale.

== Reception ==
Professional ratings
Review scores
Source	Rating
One Kiss review by IZM	3.5/5 stars
Allkpop	9.9/10 stars
Mnet Music	9.9/10 stars

The mini-album debuted at the top of both the Hanteo and Gaon weekly charts in Korea and broke previous pre-order records in Japan. The first single, "One Kiss", was released digitally on 8 January. The album debuted at number two on the Billboard World Chart.

== Track listing ==
No.	Title	Lyrics	Music	Length
1.	"One Kiss"	Kim Jaejoong	Kim Bada	3:19
2.	"Mine"	Kim Jaejoong	Kim Bada, Shaun	3:35
3.	"내안 가득히" (You Fill Me Up/There's Only You)	Kim Jaejoong	Jeon Hae Seong (전해성)	3:26
4.	"나만의 위로" (Healing for Myself/My Only Comfort)	Kim Jaejoong	Kim Jaejoong	3:12
5.	"All Alone"	Kim Jaejoong	Kim Jaejoong, Kim Se Jin (김세진)	3:53

Y (Repackage edition)
No.	Title	Lyrics	Music	Length
1.	"Kiss B" (feat. Flowsik)	Kim Jaejoong, Lee-U	Kim Jaejoong, Lee-U	4:10
2.	"Only Love" (feat. Flowsik)	Kim Jaejoong, Flowsik	Kim Jaejoong, Flowsik	3:16
3.	"내안 가득히" (You Fill Me Up/There's Only You)	Jeon Hae Seong (전해성)	Jeon Hae Seong (전해성)	3:26
4.	"All Alone"	Kim Jaejoong	Kim Jaejoong, Kim Se Jin (김세진)	3:53
5.	"One Kiss"	Kim Jaejoong	Kim Bada	3:20
6.	"나만의 위로" (Healing for Myself/My Only Comfort)	Kim Jaejoong	Kim Jaejoong	3:12
7.	"Mine"	Kim Jaejoong	Kim Bada, Shaun	3:36
8.	"One Kiss" (instrumental)	Kim Jaejoong	Kim Bada	3:20
9.	"All Alone" (instrumental)	Kim Jaejoong	Kim Jaejoong, Kim Se Jin (김세진)	3:53

== Sales ==
Country	Chart	Edition	Sales	Cumulative Sales
South Korea	Gaon Physical Sales	I	148,074	210,074
South Korea	Gaon Physical Sales	Y	62,000	210,074
Japan	Oricon Physical Sales	I	22,994	31,753
Japan	Oricon Physical Sales	Y	8,759	31,753

== Chart positions ==
=== Weekly album charts ===
Country	Chart	Peak position
South Korea	Gaon Weekly Album Chart	1
South Korea	Hanteo Weekly Chart	1
Japan	Oricon Weekly Albums Chart	8
United States	Billboard World Albums Chart	2

=== Monthly album charts ===
Country	Chart	Peak position
South Korea	Gaon Monthly Album Chart	2
South Korea	Hanteo Monthly Chart	2
Japan	Oricon Monthly Albums Chart	29

=== Singles charts ===
Country	Chart	Song	Peak position
South Korea	Gaon Weekly Single Chart	"Mine"	8
South Korea	Gaon Weekly Single Chart	"One Kiss"	15
South Korea	Gaon Weekly Single Chart	"Healing for Myself"	99

=== Other charts ===
Country	Chart	Song	Peak Position
Thailand	Channel [V] Asian Chart	"Mine"	1
China	YinYueTai Korea V Chart	"Mine"	1
Germany	German Asian Music Chart	"Mine"	1
South Korea	KBS Music Bank	"Only Love"	16
