= Colors (Melody and Harmony) / Shelter =

Single by Jejung & Yuchun (Tohoshinki)
- Released: September 30, 2009
- Recorded: 2009
- Genre: Pop
- Length: 5:34
- Label: SM Entertainment Japan/Rhythm Zone
- Songwriters: H.U.B., Jejung, Yuchun
- Producers: Yoichiro Kakizaki, Jejung, Yuchun

Music video
- "Colors ~Melody and Harmony~" on YouTube

"Colors (Melody and Harmony) / Shelter" (stylised as "COLORS ~Melody and Harmony~ / Shelter") is a special release single by South Korean boyband Tohoshinki members Jejung and Yuchun in Japan. It was released on September 30, 2009. The song was a commemorative song for the 35th anniversary of Hello Kitty in Japan.

The songs were written and co-arranged by Jejung and Yuchun personally. Bandmate Junsu also worked on the arrangement of "Shelter." "Colors (Melody and Harmony)" featured on a special digital EP, Tohoshinki Special Package, released a week before the single's physical release. Also featured on the EP was Tohoshinki's song "Amaku Hateshinaku" and "Been So Long".

== Track listing ==
=== CD+DVD version ===
No.	Title	Writer(s)	Arranger	Length
1.	"Colors (Melody and Harmony)"	H.U.B., Jejung, Yuchun	Yoichiro Kakizaki, Jejung, Yuchun	5:21
2.	"Shelter"	H.U.B., Jejung, Yuchun, Junsu	H-Wonder, Jejung	5:15
3.	"Colors (Melody and Harmony)" (less vocal)	H.U.B., Jejung, Yuchun	Kakizaki, Jejung, Yuchun	5:21
4.	"Shelter" (less vocal)	H.U.B., Jejung, Yuchun, Junsu	H-Wonder, Jejung	5:15
Total length:				21:13

DVD track listing
No.	Title	Length
1.	"Colors (Melody and Harmony)" (video clip)	5:21

=== CD only version ===
No.	Title	Writer(s)	Arranger	Length
1.	"Colors (Melody and Harmony)"	H.U.B., Jejung, Yuchun	Kakizaki, Jejung, Yuchun	5:21
2.	"Shelter"	H.U.B., Jejung, Yuchun, Junsu	H-Wonder, Jejung	5:15
3.	"Colors (Melody and Harmony) @ 4th Live Tour 2009: The Secret Code Final in Tokyo Dome"	H.U.B., Jejung, Yuchun	Kakizaki, Jejung, Yuchun	5:21
4.	"Colors (Melody and Harmony)" (less vocal)	H.U.B., Jejung, Yuchun	Kakizaki, Jejung, Yuchun	5:21
5.	"Shelter" (less vocal)	H.U.B., Jejung, Yuchun, Junsu	H-Wonder, Jejung	5:15
Total length:				26:33

== Charts ==
Chart	Peak position
Billboard Japan Hot 100	1
Billboard Adult Contemporary Airplay	18
Oricon Daily Chart	1
Oricon Weekly Chart	1
RIAJ Digital Track Chart Top 100	31
