= JX (duo) =

South Korean musical duo

- Origin: Seoul, South Korea
- Years active: 2024–present
- Labels: iNKODE; Palmtree Island
- Spinoff of: JYJ
- Members: J-JUN; XIA

JX (Korean: 제이엑스) is a South Korean duo, composed of Kim Jae-joong, and Kim Jun-su, former members of JYJ and TVXQ. Their group name is taken from the initial letters of each member's present stage names, J-JUN and XIA. The duo is co-managed by their agencies iNKODE and Palmtree Island.

== History ==
Kim Jae-joong and Xia Jun-su, along with Park Yoo-chun, debuted as part of the five-member boy group TVXQ! under SM Entertainment in 2003. In 2009, the trio filed a lawsuit against SM Entertainment, seeking to terminate their contracts due to alleged unfair contract, and unfair profit distribution. The case was resolved in their favour, and they left SM Entertainment to form JYJ in 2010 with CJeS Entertainment.

JYJ continued to be active until 2015, and after completing their mandatory military service in 2018, Yoo-chun was removed from the group due to multiple incriminating allegations. Subsequently, CJeS Entertainment announced his retirement from the entertainment industry.

Since 2018 predating their official formation as JX, Kim Jae-joong and Xia Jun-su have been in a few engagements, without officially addressing themselves as JYJ.

In 2021, Xia Jun-su left CJeS Entertainment and established his own agency, Palmtree Island. Jae-joong also left CJeS Entertainment in 2023 and founded his own agency, iNKODE.

Notably in March 2022, they released the song "Sixth Magnitude Star" for a Japanese drama, and also collaborated again for Dream Concert 2023, introducing themselves and performing together as Jae-joong and Jun-su.

=== 2024–present: Debut ===
On September 6, 2024, Kim Jaejoong and XIA Junsu announced their collaborative venture, JX and plans to held their 20th anniversary concert titled IDENTITY in KSPO Dome from November 8–10, 2024.
