= Say My Name (group) =

South Korean girl group

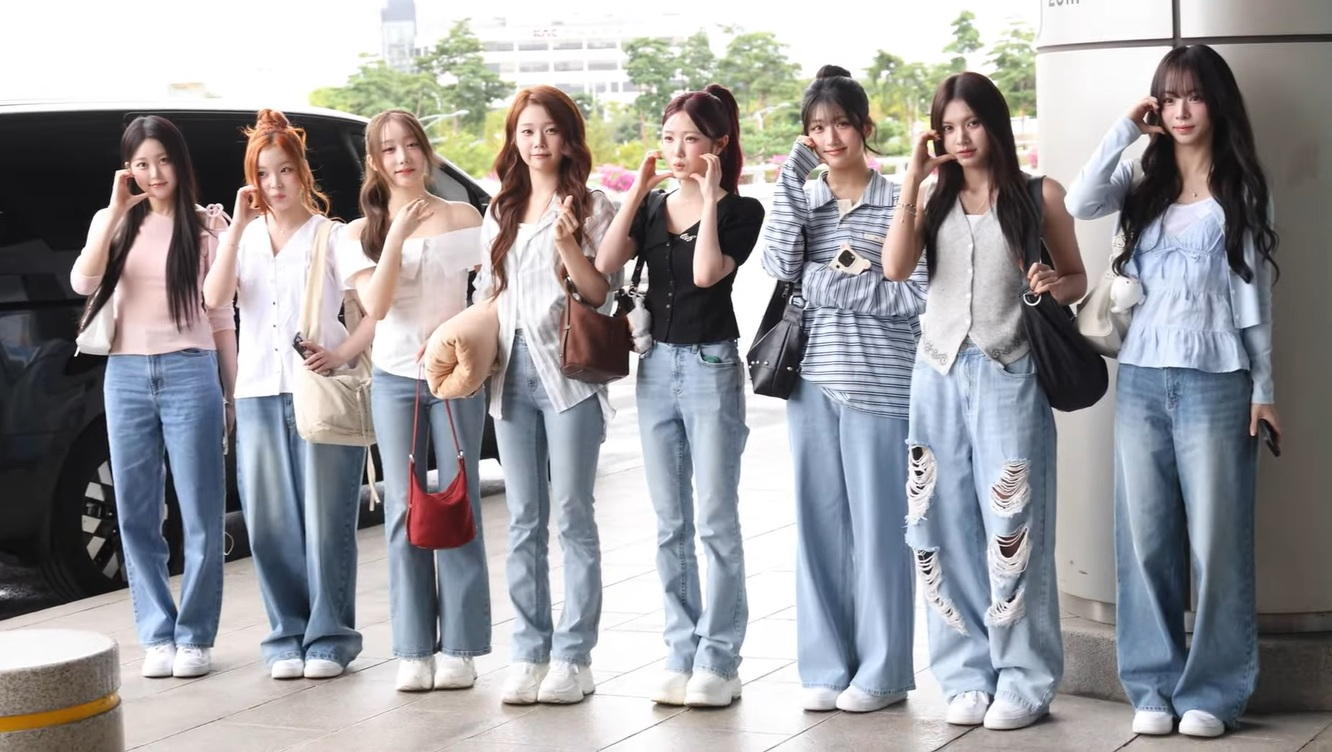
- Say My Name in September 2025; L-R: Soha, Seungjoo, Mei, Dohee, Hitomi, Junhwi, Kanny and Shuie

Background information
- Also known as: SMN
- Origin: South Korea
- Genre: K-pop
- Years active: 2024–present
- Label: Inkode
- Members: Hitomi; Shuie; Mei; Kanny; Soha; Dohee; Junhwi; Seungjoo

Say My Name (Korean: 세이마이네임) is a South Korean girl group formed and managed by Inkode. The group currently consists of eight members: Hitomi, Shuie, Mei, Kanny, Soha, Dohee, Junhwi and Seungjoo. They debuted on October 16, 2024, with the eponymous EP.

== Name ==
The group name, Say My Name, contains the meaning of the "unique identity" that only the group have, as well as the "preciousness of 'me myself, us ourselves' that many people have forgotten in the sadness and pain they experience at least once in their lives." It also contains the "aspiration to become a team that delivers a hopeful message of growing and overcoming things together and not losing themselves."

== History ==
=== Pre-debut activities and formation ===
Some members of Say My Name have previously been involved in the entertainment industry prior to joining the group. Hitomi was a member of the Japanese idol group AKB48, and through finishing 9th in the 2018 Mnet audition program Produce 48, she debuted with the Korean-Japanese project group Iz*One. Seungjoo was a contestant on MBC TV's audition program My Teenage Girl, and Mei was a contestant on the global talent competition reality show The Debut: Dream Academy.

On August 30, 2024, Inkode announced Say My Name as the company's first girl group and labelled as the girl group produced by Kim Jae-joong. The seven members of the group were revealed beginning the same day in the following order: Dohee, Kanny, Mei, Junhwi, Soha, Seungjoo, and Hitomi.

=== 2024–present: Self-titled debut EP, My Name Is..., addition of Shuie, iLy, and &Our Vibe ===
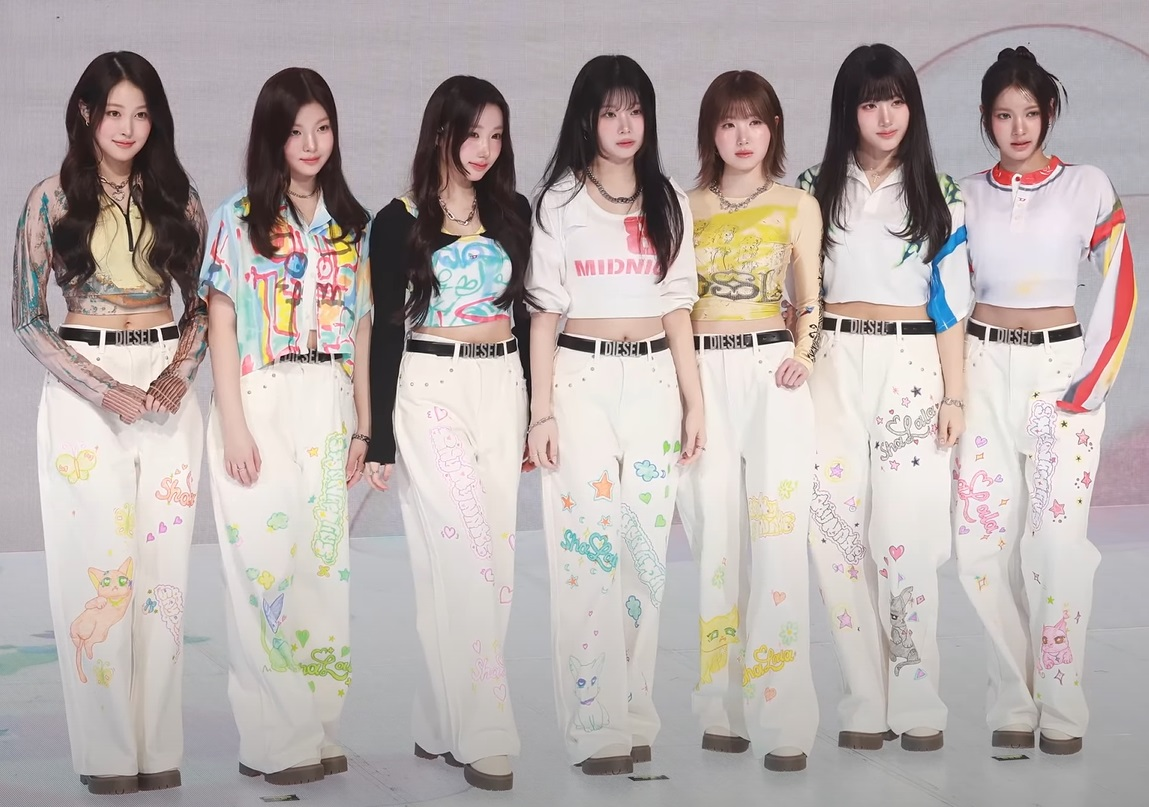
Say My Name at the showcase for My Name Is... in March 2025

On October 15, 2024, Say My Name held their offline debut showcase 'Cat Night' and their online debut showcase live streaming through SBS K-Pop Concert. The group officially debuted on October 16, with their eponymous extended play, and "WaveWay" as its lead single.

The group released their second extended play My Name Is... on March 13, 2025, with the lead single "ShaLala". On July 10, Inkode announced the addition of Shuie to the group, thereby re-organising the group to eight members. The group released the single "iLy" on August 1, marking their first release to feature member Shuie, and as an eight-member group. The single features interpolation of Frankie Valli's "Can't Take My Eyes Off You".

The group released their third extended play &Our Vibe on December 29. Say My Name also earned their first win on a domestic music show Music Bank, with the EP's lead single "UFO (Attent!on)", on January 9, 2026.

== Endorsements ==
Upon their debut, Say My Name was selected as the global model of vitamin specialized skincare brand Tiam.

== Members ==
- Hitomi (히토미) – leader
- Shuie (슈이)
- Mei (메이)
- Kanny (카니)
- Soha (소하)
- Dohee (도희)
- Junhwi (준휘)
- Seungjoo (승주)

== Discography ==
=== Extended plays ===
Title	Details	Peak chart positions	Sales
Title	Details	KOR	Sales
Say My Name	Released: October 16, 2024; Label: Inkode; Formats: CD, digital download, streaming	15	KOR: 47,811
My Name Is...	Released: March 13, 2025; Label: Inkode; Formats: CD, digital download, streaming; Track listing: 1. "XOXO"; 2. "1,2,3,4"; 3. "ShaLala"; 4. "For My Dream"; 5. "He Told Me" (처음 만난 그날처럼)	15	KOR: 103,191
&Our Vibe	Released: December 29, 2025; Label: Inkode; Formats: CD, digital download, streaming; Track listing: 1. "Bad Idea"; 2. "UFO (Attention)"; 3. "Delulu Solulu"; 4. "Hard to Love (🖤Love)"; 5. "Say My Name"	1	KOR: 163,447

=== Single albums ===
Title	Details	Peak chart positions	Sales
Title	Details	KOR	Sales
iLy	Released: August 1, 2025; Label: Inkode; Formats: Digital download, streaming	3	KOR: 61,509

=== Singles ===
Title	Year	Peak chart positions	Album
Title	Year	KOR Down.	Album
"WaveWay"	2024	39	Say My Name
"ShaLala"	2025	66	My Name Is...
"iLy"	2025	53	Non-album single
"UFO (Attention)"	2025	7	&Our Vibe

== Videography ==
=== Music videos ===
Title	Year	Director
"WaveWay"	2024	Kim Ja Kyoung (Flexible Pictures)
"ShaLala"	2025	Park Hyungjun (Kiino.002)
"ShaLala" Japanese version	2025	Park Hyungjun (Kiino.002)
"iLy"	2025	Jimmy (Via Production)
"UFO (Attention)"	2025	Min Han-gyeol

== Awards and nominations ==
Name of award ceremony, year presented, award category, nominee of award, and result of nomination
Award ceremony	Year	Category	Nominee(s) / Work(s)	Result	Ref.
Hanteo Music Awards	2024	Blooming Star – Female	Say My Name	Won	
Seoul Music Awards	2025	Rookie of the Year	Say My Name	Nominated	
Seoul Music Awards	2025	Discovery of the Year	Say My Name	Won	
