= No.X =

Studio album by Kim Jae-joong
- Released: 12 February 2016
- Recorded: 2015
- Genres: Britpop, pop punk, post-grunge, blues, rock
- Length: 41:21
- Language: Korean
- Labels: C-JeS Entertainment; Loen Entertainment

Kim Jae-joong Korean studio albums chronology
WWW (2013)	No.X (2016)	Born Gene (2022)

No.X is the second studio album by South-Korean singer Kim Jae-joong, released on 12 February 2016. The songs represent various genres, including Britpop, pop punk, post-grunge, blues, ballad and rock. It sold over 85,000 copies, making it the 9th most successful album in the first half of 2016 in South Korea. A music video for the title song, "Love You More" was released on 11 February 2016.

== Track listing ==
No.	Title	Lyrics	Music	Length
1.	"Good Morning Night"	Kim Jaejoong	Kim Tae-wan (김태완), Lee O-won (이오원)	3:33
2.	"서랍 (Seorap)" (Drawer)	Kim I-na (김이나)	David Mercy, Palle Hammerlund, Amir Badr, Zachary Moon	3:34
3.	"Love You More"	Kim Tae-wan (김태완)	Kim Tae-wan (김태완), Ye-Yo!	3:14
4.	"Love You To Death"	Kim Jaejoong	Niclas Lundin, Anton Hård af Segerstad	3:21
5.	"Good Luck"	Kim Jaejoong	Kim Jaejoong, Kwon Bin-gi (권빈기)	3:11
6.	"원망해요 (Wonmanghaeyo)" (Blame)	Kim Jaejoong	Kim Jaejoong, Park Il (박 일)	3:56
7.	"Welcome To My Wild World"	Hoi Jang-nim (회장님)	Damon Sharpe, Jason Mater	3:21
8.	"Breathing"	Kim Jaejoong	Edward K	3:24
9.	"All That Glitters"	Kim Jaejoong	Karen Ann Poole, Fraser T. Smith	3:45
10.	"다시 만나지만 다시 만나겠지만 (Dasi mannajiman, dasi mannagetjiman)" (Meeting Again, We Will Meet Again)	Kim Jaejoong	Seonghyeon Baek Mu-hyeon (성현 백무현)	3:39
11.	"그거 알아? (Geugeo ara?)" (You Know What?)	Kim Jaejoong	Daniel Davidsen, Peter Wallevik, Patrick Devine	3:31
12.	"Run Away"	Kim Jaejoong	Neil Athale, Eden Ley	2:52
Total length:				41:21
