= Say My Name (Say My Name EP) =

- Digital cover

EP by Say My Name
- Released: October 16, 2024
- Length: 12:18
- Language: Korean
- Label: Inkode; Warner

Say My Name chronology
Say My Name (2024)	My Name Is... (2025)

Singles from Say My Name
- 1. "WaveWay" Released: October 16, 2024

Say My Name is the debut extended play by South Korean girl group Say My Name. It was released by Inkode Entertainment on October 16, 2024, and contains four tracks including the lead single "WaveWay".

== Background and release ==
On September 25, 2024, Inkode Entertainment announced that Say My Name would be releasing the extended play titled Say My Name on October 16. The promotional schedule was released on the same day. A day later, the track listing was released with "WaveWay" announced as the lead single. On October 7, the highlight medley teaser video was released. The music video teasers for "WaveWay" were released on October 13 and 14. The extended play was released alongside the music video for "WaveWay" on October 16.

== Commercial performance ==
Say My Name debuted at number 18 on South Korea's Circle Album Chart in the chart issue dated October 13–19, 2024. In Japan, the extended play debuted at number 36 on the Billboard Japan Hot Albums in the chart issue dated October 23, 2024; on its component chart, it debuted at number 10 on the Top Download Albums. On the Oricon chart, the extended play debuted at number nine on the Digital Albums Chart in the chart issue dated October 28, 2024.

== Promotion ==
Prior to the release of Say My Name, on October 16, 2024, Say My Name held a live debut event aimed at introducing the extended play.

== Track listing ==
Track listing for Say My Name
No.	Title	Lyrics	Music	Arrangement	Length
1.	"Be a Star" (난 오늘 밤하늘에서 가장 빛나는 별이 된다)	Hitomi; Chase (NewType); 1Take (NewType); Reidd (NewType)	Chase (NewType); 1Take (NewType); Reidd (NewType); Nanee; NewType	Reidd (NewType)	3:28
2.	"WaveWay"	Im So-hee (153/Joombas); Chari (153/Joombas); Yoon (153/Joombas); Seyoung (153/Joombas); Chaon (153/Joombas); Kim Hye-ri (153/Joombas); Bay (153/Joombas); Choi Mal-ri (153/Joombas)	Maiz; Chelsea Warner; Sofia Quinn; Heon	Maiz	2:36
3.	"8llowme"	Kim Soo-bin (Aiming); Ahn Ji-soo (Onclassa); Jeong Da-yeon (Onclassa)	Kim Chang-rak (Aiming); Kim Soo-bin (Aiming)	Kim Soo-bin (Aiming); Kwon Soo-hyun (Aiming)	3:17
4.	"Goldilocks Water"	Kim Jae-joong	Anders Gukko; Lisa Desmond; Mona Khoshoi	Anders Gukko	2:57
Total length:					12:18

== Charts ==
=== Weekly charts ===
Weekly chart performance for Say My Name
Chart (2024)	Peak position
Japanese Digital Albums (Oricon)	9
Japanese Hot Albums (Billboard Japan)	36
South Korean Albums (Circle)	18

=== Monthly charts ===
Monthly chart performance for Say My Name
Chart (2024)	Peak position
South Korean Albums (Circle)	36

== Sales ==
Overall sales for Say My Name
Region	Sales
South Korea	31,524

== Release history ==
Release history for Say My Name
Region	Date	Format	Label
South Korea	October 16, 2024	CD	Inkode; Warner
Various	October 16, 2024	Digital download; streaming	Inkode; Warner
