= Code Name: Jackal =

2012 South Korean film

- Promotional poster
- Hangul: 자칼이 온다
- RR: Jakari onda
- MR: Chak'ari onda
- Directed by: Bae Hyoung-jun
- Screenplay by: Oh Sang-ho
- Produced by: Jo Han-joo
- Starring: Song Ji-hyo; Kim Jae-joong; Oh Dal-su
- Cinematography: Moon Wan-hee
- Edited by: Shin Min-kyung
- Music by: Kim Joon-seok; Lee Hyo-jeong
- Production company: Nomad Films
- Distributed by: Lotte Entertainment
- Release date: 15 November 2012
- Running time: 107 minutes
- Country: South Korea
- Language: Korean
- Box office: US$1,261,947

Code Name: Jackal (Korean: 자칼이 온다; lit. 'The Jackal Is Coming') is a 2012 South Korean action comedy film, starring Song Ji-hyo, Kim Jae-joong of JYJ, and Oh Dal-su. The film was directed by Bae Hyoung-jun, whose works included Too Beautiful to Lie and Once Upon a Time. It was produced by Nomad Films and distributed by Lotte Entertainment. It was released on 15 November 2012 and ran for 105 minutes.

== Summary ==
Clumsy and off-the-wall hit man Bong Min-jung (Song Ji-hyo) is hired to kill top Hallyu star Choi Hyun (Kim Jae-joong). The mission starts by abducting him at Paradise Hotel in Seong-ju, the place where Hyun checked in to rest and stay away from stress, and also where the cops are on a stakeout for a serial killer.

== Cast ==
- Song Ji-hyo as Bong Min-jung, female killer
- Kim Jae-joong as Choi Hyun, a K-pop star
- Oh Dal-su as Chief Detective Ma
- Han Sang-jin as Team Leader Shin
- Kim Sung-ryung as Angela
- Kim Yong-gun as Angela's husband
- Seo Yi An as Yoo Young Sun
- Shin Dong-mi as Seon-young

== Original soundtrack ==
- "Healing For Myself" - Kim Jae-joong
- "Kiss B" - Kim Jae-joong
- "Stay" - Kim Jae-joong

== Production ==
The film marks the first collaboration between Kim and Song, as well as Kim's first starring role in a big screen debut. A press conference was attended by the cast: Kim Jae-joong, Song Ji-hyo, Han Sang-jin and Oh Dal-su, held on 9 November 2012 at the Lotte Cinema at Konkuk University.

The film ranked fourth and grossed ₩966,147,307 on its first week of release, and grossed a total of ₩1,351,848,104 domestically after two weeks of screening.

== International release ==
Ahead of the film's release, it was announced by its distributor Lotte Entertainment that the film has been pre-sold to six Asian countries: Japan, Thailand, Malaysia, Singapore, Indonesia and Brunei.

- Japan theatrical release: 3 May 2013
- Thailand airing on Channel 7: 7 July 2017 at 02:15
