= Kim Jae-joong =

South Korean singer and actor (born 1986)

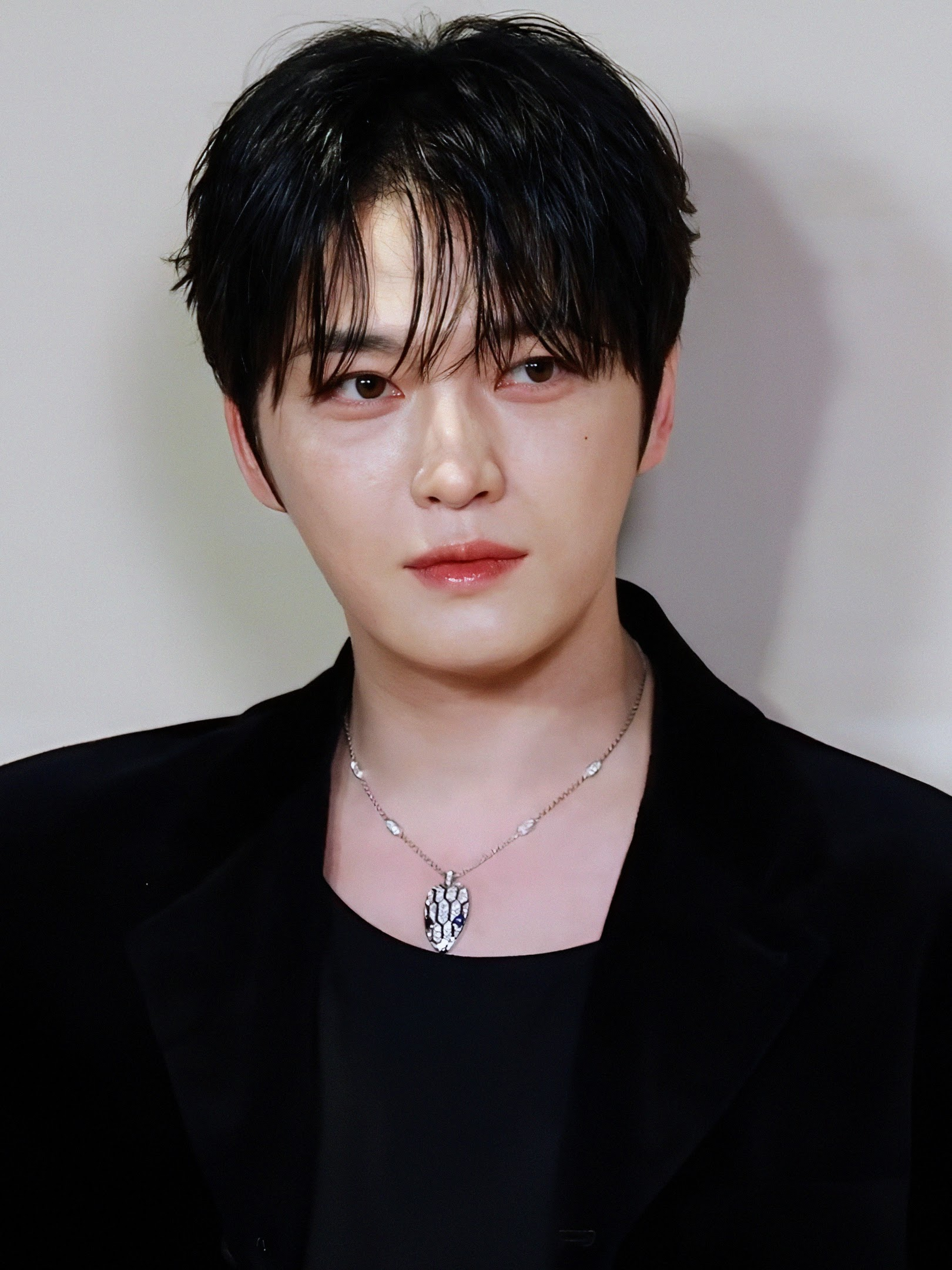
- Kim in 2025
- Born: Han Jae-joon; January 26, 1986 (age 40); Gongju, South Korea
- Other names: Hero Jae-joong; Jejung; J-Jun
- Education: Kyung Hee Cyber University
- Occupations: Singer-songwriter; actor; director; producer
- Musical career
- Genres: K-pop; Pop; R&B
- Instrument: Vocals
- Years active: 2003–present
- Labels: SM; C-JeS; Inkode
- Member of: JX
- Formerly of: TVXQ; SM Town; JYJ
- Website: jaefans.com

Korean name
- Hangul: 김재중
- Hanja: 金在中
- RR: Gim Jaejung
- MR: Kim Chaejung

Signature
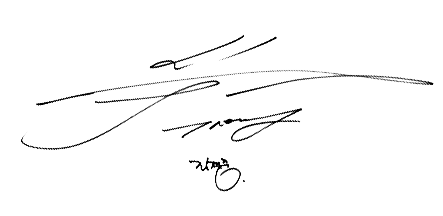

Kim Jae-joong (Korean: 김재중; born January 26, 1986), also known mononymously as Jaejoong in South Korea and Jejung/J-Jun (ジェジュン) in Japan, is a South Korean singer-songwriter, actor and director. He is a member of the Korean duo JX, a former member of JYJ and was one of the original members of boy band TVXQ!, where he was formerly known by the stage name Hero Jae-joong (영웅재중). Since 2013, he has expanded his range of activities as a solo artist, and in 2023, he formed his own agency Inkode, where he serves as the Chief Strategy Officer.

Born in Gongju, South Chungcheong Province, he moved to Seoul as a teenager to audition for SM Entertainment. From 2003 to 2010, he was the lead vocalist of South Korean boy band TVXQ. Later, he sued SM Entertainment along with Park Yoo-chun and Kim Jun-su and together they separated from TVXQ to form JYJ. As a solo artist, he has released four Korean studio albums, WWW (2013), No.X (2016), Born Gene (2022) and Flower Garden (2024). The first two reached number one on the Gaon Music Chart. In Japan, his three studio albums Flawless Love (2019), Love Covers (2019), and Love Covers II (2020) all peaked at number one on the Oricon Albums Chart. His fourth Japanese Fallinbow was released in November 2022. He has toured extensively in South Korea and Japan.

Kim has acted in TV dramas including Sunao ni Narenakute (2010), Protect the Boss (2011), Dr. Jin (2012), Triangle (2014), SPY (2015), Manhole (2017) and Bad Memory Eraser (2024); and in films such as Heaven's Postman (2009) and Jackal is Coming (2012). He has branched into hosting with season 1 and 2 of Lifetime Korea's Travel Buddies (2020, 2021), BS SKY PerfecTV's Jaejoong J! (2021) and has a documentary about his life and career called Jaejoong: On the Road (2021), directed by John H. Lee.

== Early life ==
Kim was born Han Jae-joon (한재준; 韩在俊) in Gongju, South Korea. At a young age, he was given up for adoption by his biological mother to the Kim family, and his name was changed to Kim Jae-joong. On November 21, 2006, a man with the surname Han filed a lawsuit against Kim's guardians. Han claimed he was Kim's biological father, and thus wanted parental rights. Han cited the reason for the lawsuit against Kim's legal guardians as "for not going through the proper procedures before registering [Jaejoong] in [the legal guardians'] custody." The first hearing was to be held in Kim's hometown, Gongju, on November 29, 2006, but on November 22 Han dropped the charges against Kim's legal guardians. In reaction to the matter, Kim uploaded a journal entry on his official fan club website, and said that he was informed of the existence of separate biological parents by his mother two or three years ago, and it had been quite a shock to him. With his adoptive mother's support, his biological mother was able to keep in touch with him, and to meet occasionally, but whereabouts of his father had been unknown. He expressed his will to live by the name of Kim Jae-joong, not by his birth name Han Jae-jun (한재준).

When Kim was fifteen, he moved to Seoul by himself in order to take part in the auditions held by SM Entertainment. Life in Seoul was financially difficult and he took various odd jobs to pay for rent, food, and training fees; and even appeared as an extra in movies. In an interview, he admitted he used to be tone-deaf in primary school and was frequently ridiculed for his dream of becoming a singer, but managed to overcome it through practicing alone.

Kim attended Gongju Jungdong Elementary School (중동초등학교), Kongju National University Middle School (공주대학교 사범대학 부설중학교), Kongju Information High School (공주정보고등학교) and then dropped out in 2001. He enrolled Hanam High School (하남고등학교) in 2005 and Kyung Hee Cyber University (경희사이버대학교), majoring in Digital Media Engineering.

== Music career ==
=== 2003–2010: Member of TVXQ ===
In 2001, at fifteen years old, Kim auditioned for S.M. Entertainment and was accepted into the agency. From 2003 to 2010, he was the lead vocalist of South Korean boy band TVXQ. After TVXQ went on hiatus in early 2010, he and two other fellow band members Yoochun and Junsu formed a new trio boy group, initially known as JUNSU/JEJUNG/YUCHUN in Japan.

Kim sang the solo track "Maze" for the fifth and final single of the TVXQ/Tohoshinki's Trick Project, "Keyword/Maze". Jaejoong wrote and composed "Wasurenaide" (忘れないで, lit. Don't Forget) which was included on TVXQ/Tohoshinki's twenty-fifth single "Bolero/Kiss the Baby Sky/Wasurenaide." The song was also on their fourth Japanese album The Secret Code, along with the songs "9095" and "9096" which were also composed by Kim. The song, "忘れないで" was used in a television advertisement for cosmetics in Japan.

Apart from his activities as a member of TVXQ, he sang "Insa" (인사, Greeting) for the soundtrack of A Millionaire's First Love (2006). Kim collaborated with The Grace for the Japanese version of their song "Just for One Day", which was featured on their fifth Japanese single and their debut album, Graceful 4 (2007). Kim sang "Love" for the soundtrack of the film Heaven's Postman (2009) in which he starred as the male lead.

=== 2009–2012: Formation of JYJ ===
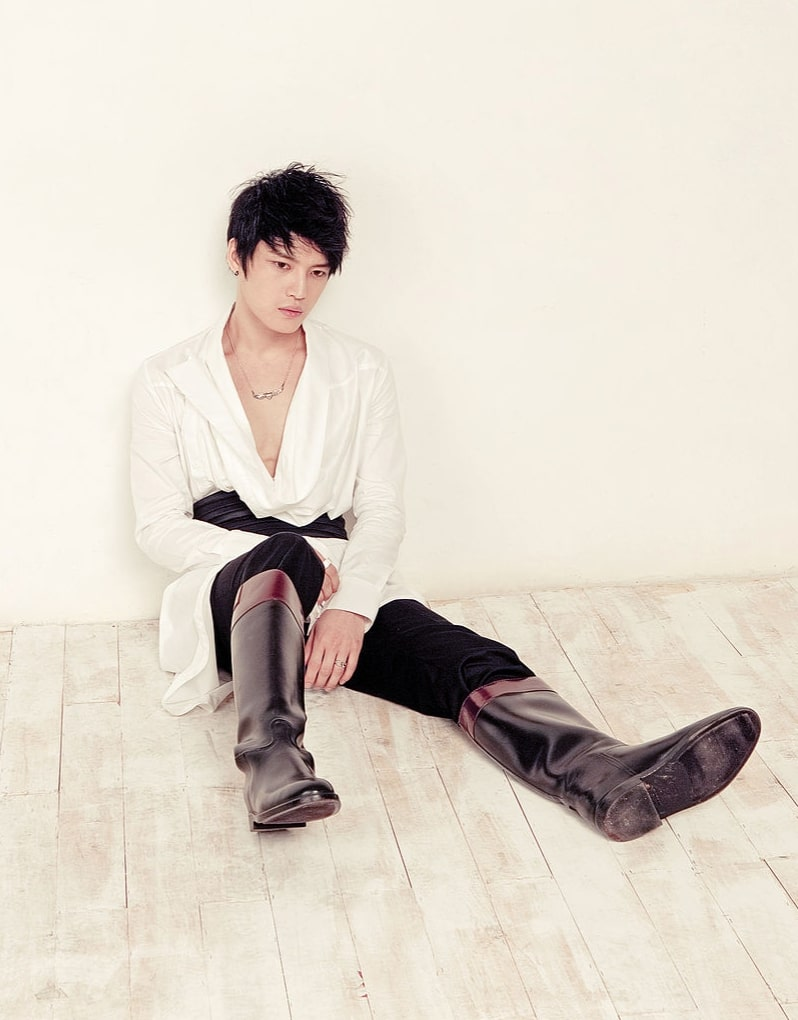
Kim in an LG advertisement in 2011

In 2009 Kim, Junsu and Yoochun, started a lawsuit against their agency, SM Entertainment, and separated from TVXQ, soon founding their own band, JYJ. On September 30, 2009, Kim and bandmate Yoochun released a self-composed single "Colors (Melody and Harmony)/Shelter." The A-side track, Colors (Melody and Harmony), was used as the image song for Hello Kitty's thirty-fifth anniversary. Jaejoong and Yoochun also participated in m-flo's album m-flo TRIBUTE -maison de m-flo, singing the track "Been So Long".

Their debut Japanese language EP The... was released in September 2010, and their first concert DVD from Tokyo Dome Thanksgiving Live in Dome both reached No. 1 on the Japanese Oricon album and DVD charts. The group's English language debut album, The Beginning was released in October 2010, featuring Kanye West.

In January 2011, they released a Korean EP, Their Rooms "Our Story", with three of Kim's own compositions, "Pierrot" (삐에로), "Nine" and "I.D.S.". In April he toured Asia and North America with JYJ, and later South America and Europe. He was also stage director of the Asian leg of the tour. In September the band released a studio album called In Heaven, which sold 350,000 copies and ranked first on the Gaon charts. He composed two new songs for the album, "In Heaven" and "Get Out". Kim composed "In Heaven" in memory of his good friend, Park Yong-ha, who committed suicide.

Apart from his activities as a member of JYJ, he also sang "Found You" and "For you It's Separation, For me It's Waiting" for the soundtrack of the television drama Sungkyunkwan Scandal (2010), "I'll Protect You" for Protect the Boss (2011), and "Living Like A Dream" for Dr. Jin (2012). "Living Like a Dream" was awarded the Best Hallyu Drama OST at the Seoul International Drama Awards.

=== 2013–2017: Solo Korean albums ===
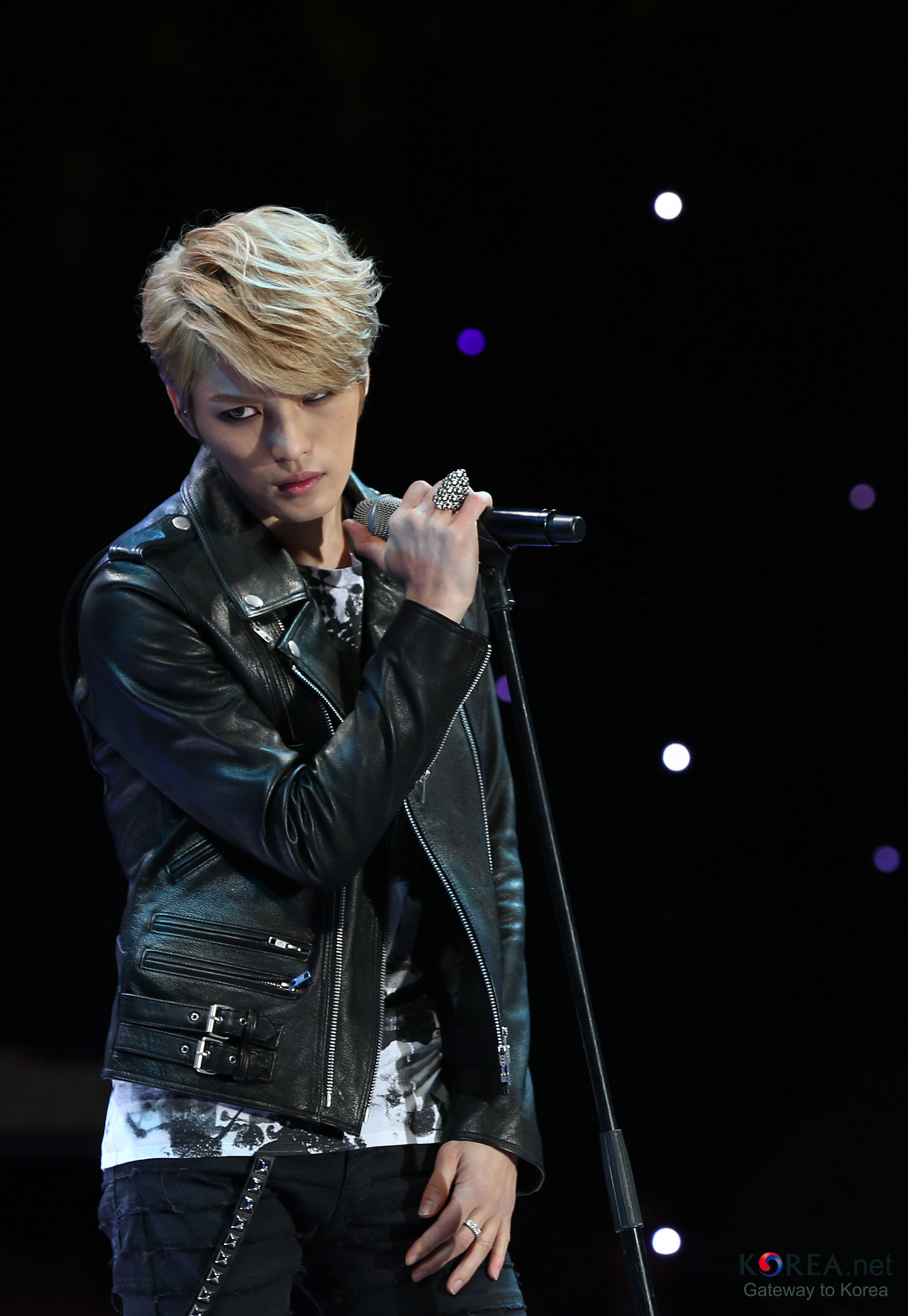
Kim performing in concert at the Korean Presidential Residence in 2013

On January 17, 2013, Kim released his first solo Korean EP titled I, a rock-themed album which Kim penned all the lyrics. The album debuted at the top of both the Hanteo and Gaon weekly charts in Korea. It was also met with resounding success throughout Asia, topping Taiwan's Five Music's Korean and Japanese music chart, Japan's Shinseido weekly chart and Yin Yue Tai's V chart for K-pop. It also topped the iTunes rock charts in nine countries. Additionally, the pre-released single "One Kiss" and lead single "Mine" topped both domestic charts and foreign charts, including a German Asian music chart. On January 26 and 27, Kim held two days of special concerts at the KINTEX Ilsan to celebrate the launch of the album, as well as his birthday. Kim then released a repackaged version of his album, titled Y which consists of contains two additional tracks: "Only Love" and "Kiss B". The album was met with success and sold 50,000 copies upon release.

His first full-length Korean solo album, WWW was released on October 29, 2013. A single titled "Sunny Day" was released ahead of the album and topped the iTunes EP chart in Japan. A repackaged version of the album, WWW: Remove Makeup was subsequently released in January 2014 and included the title track "Heaven", a pop ballad with label-mate Gummy. To promote his first album, Kim embarked on his first Asia tour which traveled to regional countries like Japan, Taiwan and China.

He sang "But I" (싫어도) and "Coincidence" (우연) for the drama Triangle (2014) in which he also starred. In July 2014, as a member of JYJ, they would release their first studio album in three years, Just Us. The band reached the music charts with the song, "Back Seat".

Prior to his military enlistment in 2015, Kim recorded the songs for his second Korean solo album, No.X, which was released on February 12, 2016. It topped iTunes charts of 39 countries around the world upon its release, and was named the most popular K-pop album in China for 2016. He completed his military service in December 2016 and returned to the entertainment industry with his acting performance in Manhole (2017).

=== 2018–2022: Solo albums ===
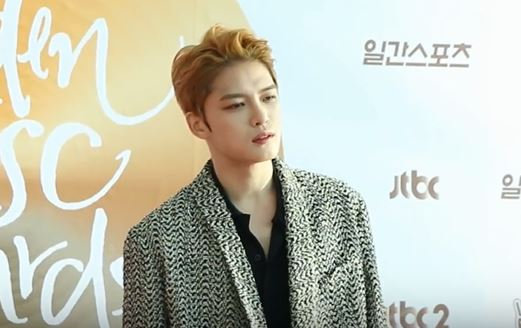
Kim at the Golden Disc Awards, 2017

Kim released his first Japanese single "Sign / Your Love" on June 27, 2018. On October 24, 2018, he released his second Japanese single, "Defiance" / "Lavender". Both singles would be certified gold (selling over 100,000 copies) by the Recording Industry Association of Japan. Those two songs would be featured on his first Japanese album, Flawless Love which was released on April 10, 2019. The album would be the first time he topped the Oricon Weekly Album Rankings as a solo artist with its debut. He promoted the album in Japan during his tour entitled The Jaejoong Arena Tour 2019 – Flawless Love. His second Japanese album, Love Covers, was released on September 25, 2019, and debuted at number one on the Oricon Weekly Album Rankings. The album was awarded the Planning Award at the 61st Japan Record Awards and the "Best 3 Albums (Asia)" award at the 34th Japan Gold Disc Award.

On January 14, 2020, Kim released his first Korean album in four years with the EP Love song (애요), along with its lead single "Tender Love". Following the EP's release, the cities and dates for his Asia Tour 2020 was announced. However, the tour dates were postponed due to COVID-19 concerns.

He released his third Japanese single on March 10, 2020, "Brava!! Brava!! Brava!!" which debuted at number one on the Oricon weekly chart. It was the opening theme song for Smile Down the Runway. His third Japanese album, Love Covers II was released on July 29, 2020, and debuted at number one on the Oricon weekly chart. It was announced on August 30, 2020, that he would be singing the opening theme song for Noblesse, entitled "BREAKING DAWN" which was written and produced by Hyde. The song will have an English, Korean and Japanese version. His Japanese tour, J-JUN LIVE TOUR 2020～BREAKING DAWN～, originally planned for October 2020 was postponed until Spring of 2021 due to the COVID-19 pandemic in Japan. On September 18, 2020, Kim released "Even If I Call You" for the Mr. Heart (2020) web drama, marking his first Korean soundtrack performance in six years. He soon followed that Korean soundtrack performance with another as he released "Things We Should Love" for the soundtrack of the Korean drama Private Lives on October 28, 2020.

In April 2022, Kim resumed activities in Japan with a live concert for his Japanese fanclub. He released a duet theme song with Kim Junsu, "六等星" lit. 'Sixth Magnitude Star' for the television adaptation of the manga Waru - Who said it's not cool to work? on April 13, 2022.

On September 13, 2022, Kim released his first Korean full-length album in six years titled Born Gene. His Asian Tour to promote the album includes stops in Seoul, Kuala Lumpur and Bangkok. He is also releasing a Japanese album, Fallinbow on November 9, 2022, which will then be followed up with a Japanese tour. On October 30, C-JeS Entertainment It was announced that Kim has urgently decided to cancel the Japan concert due to the aftermath of the Itaewon Halloween crowd crush.

=== 2023: Inkode agency ===
In April 2023, C-Jes Studio announced that Kim's contract would expire on April 22. on May 4, 2023, he announced the creation of his own agency Inkode. Inkode would focus on producing new idols and managing Kim's activities, with Kim serving as the CSO. Noh Hyun-tae, the former vice president of Cube Entertainment, will serve as the CEO.

The first teaser of Kim's new YouTube series, Jae Friends (Korean: 재친구; RR: Jaechingu), was published on July 20, 2023, and the first episode featuring Tablo of Epik High aired on July 27, 2023.

=== 2024–present: Formation of JX ===
Kim released his fourth Korean album Flower Garden in June 2024, celebrating his 20th anniversary as a musician. Having not appeared on any Korean music shows since his legal battle with SM Town, it was announced that Kim would be a music performer for Inkigayo after a 16-year absence on August 11, 2024. He also returned to acting after a seven-year break with Bad Memory Eraser (2024) airing on MBN.

Inkode announced their first girl group, Say My Name, with Kim serving as the group's executive producer. The group debuted on October 16, 2024, with their eponymous extended play, in which Kim solely wrote one of the album's tracks "Goldilocks Water".

On September 6, 2024, at 12 AM KST, the two remaining JYJ members, Kim Jae-joong and Xia Jun-su, unveiled a teaser for their continued collaborative venture, JX—which stands for Jae Joong and XIA—, on their newly created joint social media account. The teaser features a voice-over narration by the duo, emphasising their longstanding support for each other amidst the challenges and hinting at a new chapter in their journey. Following the debut of the duo, the announcement of an upcoming concert <IDENTITY> in KSPO Dome from November 8–10 was revealed.

== Acting career ==
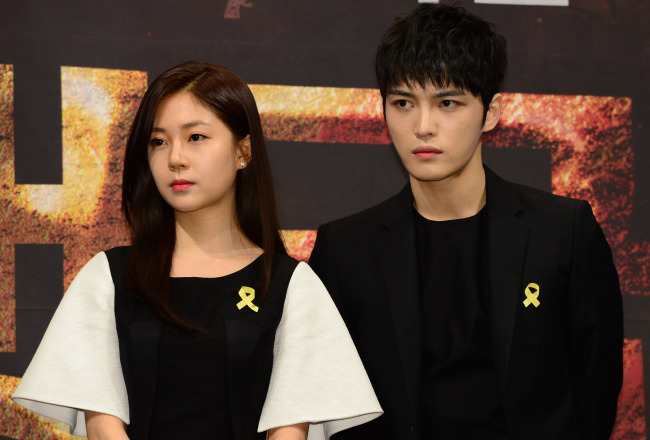
Kim Jae-joong (right) with co-star Baek Jin-hee for the premiere of Triangle

Prior to his debut as a singer, Kim worked as an extra, playing a soldier in film Taegeukgi. Along with the other members of TVXQ, he acted in television programmes, Banjun Theater and Vacation.

In November 2009, Kim co-starred with Han Hyo-joo in the joint Korean-Japanese telecinema Heaven's Postman as a young man who delivers letters written by the living to the dead and helps lingering ghosts settle their earthly affairs. This was followed by a leading role in Fuji TV's Japanese television drama Sunao ni Narenakute in September 2010. In August 2011, he starred in his first South Korean television series, Protect the Boss with Choi Kang-hee and Ji Sung. He played the role of seemingly a perfect director known for his business acumen, who becomes frustrated and fight against the constraints in his life.

In May 2012, he starred in historical fusion drama Dr. Jin with Song Seung-heon. He played the role of a high-ranking officer of the police force of Joseon Dynasty, who is an illegitimate son of the Joseon era's Prime Minister and his concubine. This was his first time acting in a sageuk, and he was praised for his performance. The same year, Kim made his big screen debut in the action comedy film Jackal is Coming playing a Hallyu star who is kidnapped by an assassin (played by labelmate Song Ji-hyo). His comical acting in the film drew positive reception from fans.

In May 2014, Kim starred in MBC's drama Triangle as a man who grows up to become a lowlife gangster. His performance won the "Top Excellence Award, Actor" at the 7th Korea Drama Awards in October the same year. In January 2015, Kim starred in KBS2's thriller SPY as a genius analyst working for South Korea's National Intelligence Service. The drama is based on the Israeli drama The Gordin Cell, modified to depict North/South Korean relations. In 2017, Kim was cast in KBS2's time-slip drama Manhole, as a man who travels back and forth through time to stop a wedding from taking place.

For the first time in 10 years, Kim returned to entertainment shows in South Korea with his appearance as a panelist for season 2 of Taste of Love in 2019. In 2020, Kim hosted a travel series where he ventured to Argentina alone to befriend strangers for Lifetime Korea's Travel Buddies which aired 10 episodes from February 8, 2020, to April 2, 2020. During a press conference, Kim stated, "We all shared similar worries. We mostly talked about the ways to unfold our life and attain goals. I believe many viewers would empathize with us. Through the conversations, I reflected upon my bygone days and deeply thought about my future. Thus, the trip was not merely about playing and entertaining to me". Kim is filming season 2 of Travel Buddies which will take place in South Korea. The airing is scheduled from the end of April to the beginning of May 2021. On March 29, 2021, Kim debuted his 6-episode variety show called ジェジュンJ! (Jaejoong J!) which was broadcast in Japan on channel BS SKY PerfecTV.

In the summer of 2021, Kim will have a documentary released about his life and career called Jaejoong: On the Road, directed by John H. Lee. In 2022, Kim was cast as the lead male role in the Korean television drama Bad Memory Eraser co-starring Jin Se-yeon. He guest starred in the third episode of the television adaptation of the manga Waru - Who said it's not cool to work?, for which he also sang the theme song.

== Directing career ==
Kim served as executive director for the Asian leg of JYJ's 2011 Worldwide Tour. He also participated in the directing team for the 2011 LG Whisen Rhythmic All Stars.

== Personal life ==
Kim helped launch Moldir, a Korean fashion brand that opened in September 2013. C-JeS Entertainment, his management, noted that Kim "has his own distinctive fashion and artistic sense. He will take it to a more serious level with his new role as an art director". He owned the largest number of shares in the company and served as the art director until it "closed for restructuring" due to COVID-19 issues in March 2020. Kim is also known for his cooking ability and has released two cookbooks, Romantic Recipes volume 1 and volume 2. The first volume was released on July 25, 2018, and featured French cuisine and was written in Japanese. The second volume was released on August 7, 2019, featuring Korean dishes and was published in Korean and Japanese. He credits his mother, who owned a restaurant, with inspiring him to become skilled at cooking.

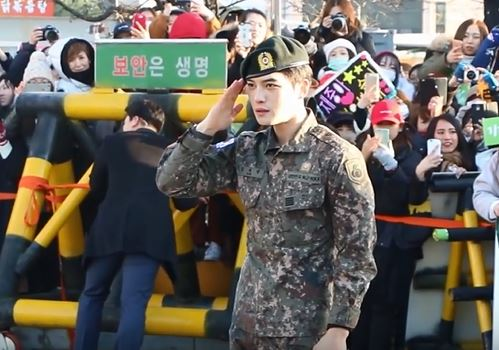
Kim returning from his military service

Kim enlisted in the army on March 31, 2015, the first five weeks spent for his mandatory basic training at the 1st Infantry Division (Republic of Korea) recruit training center in Gwangtan-myeon, Paju, Gyeonggi province. He later ended up as the top recruit among the 244 in his batch, earning the Excellence Award during the graduation ceremony. He was under the 55th Infantry Division in Cheoin District, Yongin to serve as an active-duty soldier for 21 months and was also a member of the military band. He was discharged on December 30, 2016.

On April 1, 2020 during the COVID-19 pandemic in South Korea, Kim posted on his Instagram account claiming that he has tested positive for COVID-19 due to him "[living] carelessly, disregarding all of the cautions provided by the government." An hour later, Kim posted an apology on his Instagram that the diagnosis was not true, which drew outrage from fans. He further explained his reasoning for the initial post was to raise awareness of the dangers of the virus, noting he personally knows individuals who have been infected and his father recently underwent lung cancer surgery.

== Discography ==
=== Studio albums ===
List of studio albums, with selected details, chart positions, and sales
Title	Details	Peak chart positions			Sales
Title	Details	KOR	JPN	US World	Sales
Korean
WWW	Released: October 29, 2013; Repackage album: Removing My Makeup, released on January 20, 2014; Label: C-JeS Entertainment; Formats: CD, digital download	1	4	—	KOR: 182,940; JPN: 18,828
No.X	Released: February 12, 2016; Label: C-JeS Entertainment; Formats: CD, digital download	1	8	3	KOR: 85,420; JPN: 19,930
Born Gene	Released: September 13, 2022; Label: C-JeS Entertainment; Formats: CD, digital download	5	13	—	KOR: 51,364; JPN: 2,920
Flower Garden	Released: June 26, 2024; Label: Inkode Entertainment; Formats: CD, digital download	7	13	—	KOR: 88,050; JPN: 3,453
Japanese
Flawless Love	Released: April 10, 2019; Label: First JB Music; Format: CD, digital download	—	1	—	
Love Covers	Released: September 25, 2019; Label: First JB Music; Format: CD, digital download	—	1	—	JPN: 63,396
Love Covers II	Released: July 29, 2020; Label: First JB Music; Format: CD, digital download	—	1	—	JPN: 48,082
Fallinbow	Released: November 9, 2022; Label: First JB Music; Format: CD, digital download	—	2	—	JPN: 28,091
Love Covers III	Released: November 1, 2023; Label: First JB Music; Format: CD, digital download	—	4	—	JPN: 24,029
"—" denotes releases that did not chart or were not released in that region.

=== Extended plays ===
List of extended plays, with selected details, chart positions, and sales
Title	Details	Peak chart positions			Sales
Title	Details	KOR	JPN	US World	Sales
Korean
I	Released: January 13, 2013; Repackage album: Y, released on February 26, 2013; Label: C-JeS Entertainment; Format: CD, digital	1	8	2	KOR: 210,074; JPN: 31,753
Love Song (애요)	Released: January 17, 2020; Label: C-JeS Entertainment; Format: CD, digital	1	9	—	KOR: 107,437; JPN: 8,965
Beauty in Chaos	Released: May 24, 2025; Label: Inkode; Format: CD, digital	13	23	—	KOR: 90,989; JPN: 999 (phy.)
Japanese
Rhapsody	Released: October 17, 2025; Label: Inkode; Format: CD, digital	—	1	—	JPN: 17,237 (phy.)

=== Single albums ===
List of single albums, with selected details, chart positions, and sales
Title	Details	Peak chart positions	Sales
Title	Details	KOR	Sales
Sequence #4	Released: December 30, 2024; Label: Inkode Entertainment; Formats: CD, digital download	5	KOR: 29,671

=== Singles ===
List of singles, showing year released, with selected chart positions, sales, certifications and album name
Title	Year	Peak positions			Sales	Certifications	Album
Title	Year	KOR	JPN	JPN 100	Sales	Certifications	Album
Korean
"One Kiss"	2013	15	—	—	KOR: 116,067		I
"Mine"	2013	8	—	—	KOR: 115,692		I
"Sunny Day" (햇살 좋은 날) (feat. Lee Sang-gon of Noel)	2013	18	—	—	KOR: 107,813		WWW
"Butterfly"	2013	53	—	—	KOR: 30,459		WWW
"Just Another Girl"	2013	43	—	—	KOR: 41,359		WWW
"You Know What?" (그거 알아?)	2016	78	—	—	KOR: 26,902		No.X
"Love You More"	2016	62	—	—	KOR: 22,059		No.X
"Tender Love" (여리디여린 사랑을)	2020	—	—	—			Love Song
"Nobody Like You"	2022	— (Note: "Nobody Like You" did not enter the Circle Digital Chart, but it peaked at number 97 on the component Download Chart.)	—	—			Born Gene
"I Am U"	2024	— (Note: "I Am U" did not enter the Circle Digital Chart, but it peaked at number 55 on the component Download Chart.)	—	—			Flower Garden
"Glorious Day"	2024	— (Note: "Glorious Day" did not enter the Circle Digital Chart, but it peaked at number 70 on the component Download Chart.)	—	—			Flower Garden
"Hoper"	2024	— (Note: "Hoper" did not enter the Circle Digital Chart, but it peaked at number 72 on the component Download Chart.)	—	—			Sequence #4
"Rock Star"	2025	—	—	—			Beauty In Chaos
"Tonight"	2026	—	—	—			The Wave
Japanese
"Sign" / "Your Love"	2018	—	2	2	JPN: 100,000	RIAJ: Gold	Flawless Love
"Defiance"	2018	—	3	48	JPN: 116,000	RIAJ: Gold	Flawless Love
"Brava!! Brava!! Brava!!" / "Ray of Light"	2020	—	1	—	JPN: 45,820		Fallinbow
"Breaking Dawn"	2021	—	1	—	JPN: 38,352		Fallinbow
"Fallinbow"	2022	—	—	—			Fallinbow
"Glamorous Sky"	2023	—	—	—			Fallinbow
"Rhapsody"	2025	—	—	—			Rhapsody
"Oasis"	2026	—	—	—			Non-album single

=== Music videos ===
Title	Year	Director	Ref.
"Mine"	2013	Unknown	
"Just Another Girl"	2013	Unknown	
"Love You More"	2016	Unknown	

=== Soundtrack appearances ===
Year	Song	Album
2006	인사 (Greetings)	A Millionaire's First Love OST
2009	사랑아(Love)	Heaven's Postman OST
2010	To You It's Goodbye, To Me It's Waiting	Sungkyunkwan Scandal OST
2011	"지켜줄게" (I'll Protect You)	Protect the Boss OST
2012	살아도 꿈인 것처럼" (Living Like A Dream)	Dr. Jin OST
2012	Stay	Jackal is Coming OST
2014	싫어도 (But I)	Triangle OST
2014	우연 (Coincidence)	Triangle OST
2020	Even If I Call You	Mr. Heart (web drama) OST
2020	Breaking Dawn	Noblesse anime OST
2020	Things We Should Love	Private Lives OST

=== Composing and songwriting ===
Year	Song	Artist(s)	Album(s)	Credits
2008	"Don't Cry My Lover"	TVXQ	Mirotic	Co-writer, co-composer
2008	"Kiss Shita Mama Sayonara"	TVXQ	T	Co-composer
2009	"Wasurenaide"	TVXQ	The Secret Code	Co-writer, co-composer
2009	"9095"	TVXQ	The Secret Code	Co-writer, co-producer
2009	"9096"	TVXQ	The Secret Code	Co-writer, co-producer
2009	"Colors~Melody and Harmony~"	Jejung & Yuchun	Colors (Melody and Harmony) / Shelter (single)	Co-writer, co-producer
2009	"Shelter"	JYJ	Colors (Melody and Harmony) / Shelter (single)	Co-writer, co-producer
2010	"Still in Love"	JYJ	The Beginning	Composer
2011	"Nine"	JYJ	Their Rooms "Our Story", In Heaven	Co-writer, co-producer
2011	"Pierrot"	JYJ	Their Rooms "Our Story", In Heaven	Co-writer, co-producer
2011	"I.D.S."	JYJ	Their Rooms "Our Story", In Heaven	Co-writer, co-composer
2011	"I'll Protect You"	Kim Jae-joong	Protect the Boss OST	Co-writer, co-composer
2011	"Boy's Letter"	JYJ	In Heaven	Lyricist
2011	"Get Out"	JYJ	In Heaven	Co-writer, co-producer
2011	"In Heaven"	JYJ	In Heaven	Co-writer, co-producer
2012	"No Gain"	Junsu	Tarantallegra	Co-writer, co-composer
2012	"Living Like A Dream"	Kim Jae-joong	Dr. Jin OST	Lyricist
2012	"Until the Sun Rises"	Baek Seung-heon	Until the Sun Rises	Co-writer, co-composer
2012	"Stay"	Kim Jae-joong	Jackal is Coming OST	Co-writer, co-composer
2012	"Kiss B"	Kim Jae-joong	Jackal is Coming OST	Co-writer, co-composer
2012	"Healing for Myself"	Kim Jae-joong	Jackal is Coming OST	Co-writer, co-composer
2013	"One Kiss"	Kim Jae-joong	I/MINE	Lyricist
2013	"Mine"	Kim Jae-joong	I/MINE	Lyricist
2013	"All Alone"	Kim Jae-joong	I/MINE	Co-writer, co-composer
2013	"Only Love"	Kim Jae-joong	Y	Co-writer, co-composer
2013	"On My Mind"	M.Pire	New Born	Co-writer, co-composer
2013	"Light/Brighter"	Kim Jae-joong	WWW	Lyricist
2013	"Don't Walk Awayv	Kim Jae-joong	WWW	Lyricist
2013	"Just Another Girl"	Kim Jae-joong	WWW	Lyricist
2013	"Butterfly"	Kim Jae-joong	WWW	Lyricist
2013	"Rotten Love"	Kim Jae-joong	WWW	Co-writer, co-composer
2013	"Let The Rhythm Flow"	Kim Jae-joong	WWW	Lyricist
2013	"I said I am sorry"	Kim Jae-joong	WWW	Co-writer, co-composer
2013	"9+1#"	Kim Jae-joong	WWW	Co-writer, co-composer
2013	"Modem Beat"	Kim Jae-joong	WWW	Co-lyricist
2013	"Paradise"	Kim Jae-joong	WWW	Co-writer, co-composer
2014	"But I"	Kim Jae-joong	Triangle OST	Lyricist
2014	"Coincidence"	Kim Jae-joong	Triangle OST	Lyricist
2014	"Let Me See"	JYJ	Just Us	Lyricist
2014	"Babo Boy"	JYJ	Just Us	Lyricist
2014	"Dear J"	JYJ	Just Us	Lyricist
2014	"Let Me See"	JYJ	Just Us	Lyricist
2016	"Good Morning Night"	Kim Jae-joong	No.X	Lyricist
2016	"Love You To Death"	Kim Jae-joong	No.X	Lyricist
2016	"Good Luck"	Kim Jae-joong	No.X	Co-writer, co-composer
2016	"Blame"	Kim Jae-joong	No.X	Co-writer, co-composer
2016	"Breathing"	Kim Jae-joong	No.X	Lyricist
2016	"All That Glitters"	Kim Jae-joong	No.X	Lyricist
2016	"Meeting Again, Will Meet Again"	Kim Jae-joong	No.X	Lyricist
2016	"You Know What?"	Kim Jae-joong	No.X	Lyricist
2016	"Run Away"	Kim Jae-joong	No.X	Lyricist

== Filmography ==
=== Film ===
Year	Title	Role	Notes	Ref.
2004	Taegeukgi	Extra		
2009	Heaven's Postman	Shin Jae-joon		
2012	Jackal is Coming	Choi Hyun		
2021	Jaejoong: On the Road	Himself	Documentary Film	

=== Television series ===
Year	Title	Role	Notes	Ref.
2010	Sunao ni Narenakute	Park Seon-su / Doctor	Japanese drama	
2011	Protect the Boss	Cha Mu-won		
2012	Dr. Jin	Kim Kyung-tak		
2014	Triangle	Jang Dong-chul / Heo Young-dal		
2015	Spy	Kim Seon-woo		
2017	Manhole	Bong Pil		
2024	Bad Memory Eraser	Lee Goon		

=== Television shows ===
Year	Title	Role	Notes	Ref.
2013	The Zoo is Alive 2	Narrator		
2017–18	Photo People	Cast Member	Season 1–2	
2019	Taste of Love	Panelist	Season 2	
2020	ジェジュンJ! (Jaejoong J!)	Host		
2020–21	Travel Buddies	Host	Season 1–2	
2021	Hallyu Ike-kup	Cast Member	with Takuya Terada	
2021	The Village Shop	Cast Member		
2022	Hope TV	Special MC	Episode 5–6	
2023	Magic lamp	Cast Member		

== Tours ==
2012 Asia Fan Meeting Tour
Date	City	Country	Venue	Audience
December 10, 2011	Shanghai	China	Shanghai Changning Gymnastic Center	—
February 5, 2012	Ankara	Turkey	Ankara University	600
May 23, 2012	Taipei	Taiwan	ATT BOX	2,500
October 20, 2012	Nanjing	China	Nanjing Olympic Sports Centre	—
October 23, 2012	Bangkok	Thailand	Bitec Hall	5,000
November 3, 2012	Jakarta	Indonesia	Mata Elang International Stadium	4,000
November 9, 2012	Ho Chi Minh City	Vietnam	Saigon Exhibition and Convention Center	—
Total				17,500

Kim Jaejoong 1st Album Asia Tour
Date	City	Country	Venue	Audience
January 26, 2013	Goyang	South Korea	KINTEX Ilsan	16,000
January 27, 2013	Goyang	South Korea	KINTEX Ilsan	16,000
February 17, 2013	Bangkok	Thailand	BITEC Hall	5,000
March 17, 2013	Shanghai	China	Shanghai Gymnasium	5,000
March 24, 2013	Hong Kong	China	HKCEC Hall	—
April 6, 2013	Nanjing	China	Nanjing Olympic Sports Center	4,000
April 13, 2013	Taipei	Taiwan	Taiwan University Gymnasium	4,000
June 24, 2013	Yokohama	Japan	Yokohama Arena	45,000
June 25, 2013	Yokohama	Japan	Yokohama Arena	45,000
June 26, 2013	Yokohama	Japan	Yokohama Arena	45,000
Total				83,000

WWW Asia Tour
Date	City	Country	Venue	Audience
November 2, 2013	Seoul	South Korea	Coex Hall D	14,000
November 3, 2013	Seoul	South Korea	Coex Hall D	14,000
November 15, 2013	Yokohama	Japan	Yokohama Stadium	60,000
November 16, 2013	Yokohama	Japan	Yokohama Stadium	60,000
November 23, 2013	Taipei	Taiwan	Taiwan University Gymnasium	3,500
December 7, 2013	Nanjing	China	Wutaishan Stadium	—
December 8, 2013	Nanjing	China	Wutaishan Stadium	—
December 17, 2013	Osaka	Japan	Osaka-jō Hall	22,000
December 18, 2013	Osaka	Japan	Osaka-jō Hall	22,000
January 4, 2014	Busan	South Korea	BEXCO	—
January 11, 2014	Gwangju	South Korea	Yeomju Gymnasium	—
January 22, 2014	Nagoya	Japan	Nippon Gaishi Hall	18,000
January 23, 2014	Nagoya	Japan	Nippon Gaishi Hall	18,000
January 25, 2014	Seoul	South Korea	Korea University Tiger Dome	11,000
January 26, 2014	Seoul	South Korea	Korea University Tiger Dome	11,000
Total				N/A

2015 Kim Jaejoong J-Party
Date	City	Country	Venue	Audience
January 21, 2015	Yokohama	Japan	Yokohama Arena	25,000
January 22, 2015	Yokohama	Japan	Yokohama Arena	25,000
January 26, 2015	Seoul	South Korea	Jamsil Indoor Stadium	—
Total				N/A

2017 Asia Tour 'The Rebirth of J'
Date	City	Country	Venue	Audience
January 21, 2017	Seoul	South Korea	Korea University Hwajung Gymnasium	10,000
January 22, 2017	Seoul	South Korea	Korea University Hwajung Gymnasium	10,000
February 7, 2017	Yokohama	Japan	Yokohama Arena	36,000
February 8, 2017	Yokohama	Japan	Yokohama Arena	36,000
February 9, 2017	Yokohama	Japan	Yokohama Arena	36,000
February 13, 2017	Osaka	Japan	Osaka-jō Hall	20,000
February 14, 2017	Osaka	Japan	Osaka-jō Hall	20,000
February 22, 2017	Nagoya	Japan	Nippon Gaishi Hall	15,000
February 23, 2017	Nagoya	Japan	Nippon Gaishi Hall	15,000
February 25, 2017	Saitama	Japan	Saitama Super Arena	25,000
February 26, 2017	Saitama	Japan	Saitama Super Arena	25,000
March 11, 2017	Hong Kong	China	AsiaWorld–Expo	5,000
March 18, 2017	Bangkok	Thailand	Royal Paragon Hall	5,000
March 25, 2017	Macao	China	Cotai Arena	5,000
April 1, 2017	Kaohsiung	Taiwan	Kaohsiung Arena	4,000
Total				125,000

2024 Asia Tour "Flower Garden"
Date	City	Country	Venue	Attendance
July 20, 2024	Seoul	South Korea	Jangchung Arena	
July 21, 2024	Seoul	South Korea	Jangchung Arena	
July 27, 2024	Yokohama	Japan	Pia Arena MM	
July 28, 2024	Yokohama	Japan	Pia Arena MM	
August 21, 2024	Bangkok	Thailand	Thunder Dome	
August 24, 2024	Kobe	Japan	World Memorial Hall	
August 25, 2024	Kobe	Japan	World Memorial Hall	
September 14, 2024	Ho Chi Minh City	Vietnam	Military Zone 7 Indoor Sports Complex	
September 21, 2024	Taipei	Taiwan	New Tapei City Exhibition Hall	
October 13, 2024	Macau	China	Broadway Theater	
October 19, 2024	Jakarta	Indonesia	ICE BSD City Hall 5	
Total				N/A

== Awards and nominations ==
Name of award ceremony, year presented, award category, nominee of award, and result of nomination
Award ceremony	Year	Category	Nominee(s) / Work(s)	Result	Ref.
Asia Artist Awards	2023	Top of K-pop Record Award	Kim Jae-joong	Won	
Asia Artist Awards	2023	Best Choice Award	Kim Jae-joong	Won	
Asian Film Awards	2019	Next Generation Star Award	Kim Jae-joong	Won	
BIFF — Asia Contents Awards	2019	Excellence Award	Kim Jae-joong	Won	
Golden Disc Awards	2017	Asia Popularity Award	Kim Jae-joong	Won	
Japan Gold Disc Award	2020	Best 3 Albums (Asia)	Love Covers	Won	
Japan Record Awards	2019	Planning Award	Love Covers	Won	
KBS Entertainment Awards	2025	Excellence Award (Reality)	Stars' Top Recipe at Fun-Staurant	Won	
Korea Drama Awards	2012	Excellence Award, Actor	Dr. Jin	Nominated	
Korea Drama Awards	2014	Top Excellence Award, Actor	Triangle	Won	
MBC Drama Awards	2012	Best New Actor	Dr. Jin	Won	
MBC Drama Awards	2014	Best Actor in a Special Project Drama	Triangle	Nominated	
Nikkan Sports Drama Grand Prix	2010	Best Supporting Actor for Spring Season	Sunao ni Narenakute	Won	
Philippine K-pop Awards	2010	Hottest Male Idol	Kim Jae-joong	Won	
Philippine K-pop Awards	2011	Hottest Male Artist	Kim Jae-joong	Won	
Philippine K-pop Awards	2012	Hottest Male Artist	Kim Jae-joong	Won	
SBS Drama Awards	2011	New Star Award	Protect the Boss	Won	
Seoul International Drama Awards	2013	Best Hallyu Drama OST Award	"Living Like A Dream"	Won	
Shorty Awards	2011	Best Celebrity on Twitter	Kim Jae-joong	Won	
V Chart Awards	2017	Best Male Artist	Kim Jae-joong	Won	
