= WWW (album) =

WWW (Who When Why)

Studio album by Kim Jaejoong
- Released: 29 October 2013
- Recorded: 2013
- Genre: Rock
- Language: Korean
- Labels: C-JeS Entertainment, A&G Modes

Kim Jaejoong chronology
I (2013)	WWW (Who When Why) (2013)	No.X (2016)

WWW (Who When Why) is the first solo studio album recorded by South Korean singer Kim Jaejoong. The album was released on 29 October 2013 by C-JeS Entertainment. Upon release, the title song, "Just Another Girl", charted in 34 countries on iTunes, topping it in twelve countries.

== Background ==
The album title was created by Jaejoong—"Who, When, Why" refers to the questions asked when a relationship ends.

It was the second musical release by Jaejoong in 2013, following his mini-album, entitled I, and its repackage, Y.

== Release ==
Upon release the title song, Just Another Girl charted in 34 countries on iTunes, and the album reached the top of the charts in the rock album category in twelve countries and regions, namely in Japan, Taiwan, Thailand, Malaysia, the Philippines, Singapore, Hong Kong, Indonesia, Barbados, Lithuania and Slovakia. It also charted #8 in Finland, #9 in Israel and #11 in Mexico.

The album also reaches the no.2 position in the Gaon October monthly chart — despite being released on 29 October 2013 — with sales reaching over 100 000 copies.

Immediately after the release of the album, Jaejoong embarks on his Asia Tour, the first stop being the COEX Hall in Seoul, with audiences reaching over 14 000 in numbers. The sold-out concert in Seoul occurs for 2 continuous night, with appearances from well-known artists like Kim Bum Soo and Gummy (singer) (a labelmate). Tachibana Hirohito, a Japanese newscaster and host also attended the Seoul concert. On 4 November 2013, he updated his Twitter with ' Due to work, I came to Seoul. JYJ’s Jaejoong solo concert the other day was the best. I was lost in the charm of rocker Jaejoong ' and ' After participating in JYJ’s Jaejoong concert, once again, I am convinced that he was heavily influenced by Japan’s rock band like Laruku ( L'Arc-en-Ciel ) and B’z. Songs that he sang in Japanese were also really wonderful ', praising the singer's stage presence and voice.

After the success of Seoul Concert, the singer hops on a plane to Yokohama, Japan, for another two-day concert in Yokohama Stadium. The singer attracts a whopping 60 000 audience in a two-day sold-out concert, despite the cold weather. Amidst all the concert blues, Jaejoong attended various interviews in news outlets and radio shows in Japan, a feat he can't do in his own country due to the obstruction his group received from the industry. His Yokohama concert received a lot of attention in Japan despite the dimming Hallyu Wave, since Jaejoong was perceived as the K-pop prince of Japan. News outlet in Japan also coined a term called 'Jejungnomics' due to Jaejoong's effect on the economy and his selling power. On 27 November 2013, Yokohama FM announces that Jaejoong will have his own segment in their radio show, 'Jejung's whisper' which will air every Wednesday.

The singer then flew to Guangzhou, China with his fellow JYJ members for their 2014 Asian Games roadshow. Right after their performance, Jaejoong flew to Taipei, Taiwan for his next stop. There, the singer performed in front of 3600 fans in a yet another sold out concert, despite having to compete with Taiwan's Golden Horse Award ceremony. Vanness Wu, a member of the popular F4 reportedly attended the concert.

== Track listing ==
No.	Title	Lyrics	Music	Length
1.	"빛 (Light)" (Bit)	Kim Jaejoong	Jung Jae-yeop	3:40
2.	"Don't Walk Away (Feat. Yong Jun-hyung of B2ST)"	Kim Jaejoong	TEXU	3:36
3.	"Just Another Girl"	Kim Jaejoong, D.Brown, Seong Hyeon, Baek Mu-hyeon	D.Brown, Seong Hyeon, Baek Mu-hyeon	3:11
4.	"Butterfly"	Kim Jaejoong	Hui Jang-nim, 2JAJA	4:30
5.	"Rotten Love"	Kim Jaejoong	Kim Jaejoong, Kwon Bin-gi	4:00
6.	"햇살 좋은 날 (Sunny Day) (ft. Lee Sang-gon of Noel)" (Haessal joheun nal)	Seong Hyeon, Baek Mu-hyeon	Seong Hyeon, Baek Mu-hyeon	4:01
7.	"Let the Rhythm Flow"	Kim Jaejoong	TEXU	4:07
8.	"그랬지 (It is)" (Geuraettji)	Kim Jaejoong	Kim Jaejoong	3:58
9.	"Now Is Good"	Yoon Do-hyun	Yoon Do-hyun	3:36
10.	"9+1#"	Kim Jaejoong	Kim Jaejoong	3:47
11.	"Luvholic (feat. Ha Dong-kyun)"	Tae Wan (C-LUV)	Tae Wan (C-LUV), 251, HIGH J	2:49
12.	"Modem Beat"	Kim Jaejoong, Takuro	Takuro	3:31
13.	"Paradise"	Kim Jaejoong	Kim Jaejoong, Park Il	4:04
Total length:				48:50

== Sales ==
Country	Chart	Edition	Sales	Cumulative sales
South Korea	Gaon Physical Sales	WWW	132,940	182,940
South Korea	Gaon Physical Sales	WWW Repackage (Limited copies)	50,000	182,940
Japan	Oricon Physical Sales	WWW	18,828	18,828
Japan	Oricon Physical Sales	WWW Repackage	__	18,828
