= Live World Tour: Catch Me in Seoul =

- CD cover

Live album by TVXQ
- Released: May 22, 2014 (CD); August 14, 2014 (DVD)
- Recorded: November 17–18, 2012 at Olympic Gymnastics Arena
- Genre: K-pop; R&B; dance; electropop; dubstep; rock
- Language: Korean; Japanese
- Label: S.M. Entertainment
- Producer: Lee Soo-man

TVXQ chronology
| Tree (2014) | Live World Tour: Catch Me in Seoul (2014) | With (2014) |

TVXQ video chronology
| Live Tour 2013: Time (2013) | Live World Tour: Catch Me in Seoul (2014) | Live Tour 2014: Tree (2014) |

Live World Tour: Catch Me in Seoul (printed as TVXQ! The 4th World Tour "Catch Me in Seoul") is a live album by South Korean pop duo TVXQ. It was recorded at the Olympic Gymnastics Arena from November 17–18, 2012, during the Seoul stop for the duo's fourth concert tour, Catch Me: Live World Tour.

The tour's official photo book, printed at 148 pages, was released on May 9, 2014. The official CD recording, which was released on May 22, 2014, features 29 live recordings and two bonus tracks, which are studio versions of previously unreleased songs. The DVD, released on August 14, 2014, includes a special concert making film and additional stage footage.

== Chart performance ==
The CD release of Catch Me in Seoul debuted at number three on South Korea's Gaon Albums Chart and at number six on the monthly chart, selling 19,979 units. In Japan, the live album debuted at number fifty-nine on Japan's Oricon Albums Chart, selling 1,245 imported copies in its first week of release in Japan. Catch Me in Seoul peaked at number nineteen on its second week of release in Japan, selling 5,230 copies.

== Track listing ==
=== CD ===
Disc 1
| No. | Title | Length |
|---|---|---|
| 1. | "Prepare to Fire" (Intro) | 7:24 |
| 2. | "Rising Sun" (Rearranged) | 5:22 |
| 3. | "Getaway" | 3:40 |
| 4. | "Hey! (Don't Bring Me Down)" (Rearranged) | 4:57 |
| 5. | "'O' - 正.反.合." (Rearranged) | 5:34 |
| 6. | "비누처럼 (Like a Soap)" | 3:29 |
| 7. | "How Are You" | 4:03 |
| 8. | "Journey" | 3:31 |
| 9. | "고백 (Confession)" (Max Changmin solo) | 4:03 |
| 10. | "Honey Funny Bunny" (U-Know Yunho solo) | 3:56 |
| 11. | "Wrong Number" (New Version) | 4:54 |
| 12. | "I Don't Know" (Korean Version) | 3:25 |
| 13. | "Humanoids" | 3:46 |
| 14. | "Purple Line" (Korean Version) | 3:19 |
| 15. | "이것만은 알고 가 (Before U Go)" | 5:03 |
| 16. | "Destiny" | 4:09 |

Disc 2
| No. | Title | Length |
|---|---|---|
| 1. | "Ballad Medley" ("기억을 따라서 Everlasting" / "I Never Let Go" / "약속했던 그때에 Always There..." / "지금처럼 Like Right Now") | 8:17 |
| 2. | "I Wanna Hold You" | 4:12 |
| 3. | "Here I Stand" | 4:08 |
| 4. | "꿈 (Dream)" | 3:55 |
| 5. | "Catch Me" | 4:38 |
| 6. | "B.U.T (BE-AU-TY)" | 3:37 |
| 7. | "Keep Your Head Down" (Rearranged) | 5:50 |
| 8. | "바보 (Unforgettable)" | 4:18 |
| 9. | "주문 (Mirotic)" | 3:36 |
| 10. | "여름날 (Hi Ya Ya)" (Rearranged) | 3:32 |
| 11. | "Summer Dream" | 3:32 |
| 12. | "Sky" | 3:50 |
| 13. | "I'll Be There" | 4:41 |
| 14. | "B.U.T. (BE-AU-TY)" (Korean Studio Version) | 3:34 |
| 15. | "기억을 따라서 (Everlasting)" (Korean Studio Version of "Toki o Tomete"; lyrics by Changmin) | 5:37 |

=== DVD ===
Disc 1
| No. | Title | Length |
|---|---|---|
| 1. | "Prepare to Fire" (Intro) |
| 2. | "Rising Sun (순수)" (Rearranged) |
| 3. | "Getaway" |
| 4. | "Hey! (Don't Bring Me Down)" (Rearranged) |
| 5. | "'O' - 正.反.合." (Rearranged) |
| 6. | "Opening Ment" |
| 7. | "비누처럼 (Like a Soap)" |
| 8. | "How Are You" |
| 9. | "Journey" |
| 10. | "고백 (Confession)" (Max Changmin solo) |
| 11. | "Honey Funny Bunny" (U-Know Yunho solo) |
| 12. | "Wrong Number" (New Version) |
| 13. | "I Don't Know" (Korean Version) |
| 14. | "Humanoids" |
| 15. | "Purple Line" (Korean Version) |
| 16. | "이것만은 알고 가 (Before U Go)" |
| 17. | "Destiny" |

Disc 2
| No. | Title | Length |
|---|---|---|
| 18. | "Ment" |
| 19. | "Ballad Medley" ("기억을 따라서 Everlasting" / "I Never Let Go" / "약속했던 그때에 Always There..." / "지금처럼 Specially") |
| 20. | "I Wanna Hold You" |
| 21. | "Here I Stand" |
| 22. | "꿈 (Dream)" |
| 23. | "Catch Me" |
| 24. | "B.U.T (BE-AU-TY)" |
| 25. | "Keep Your Head Down" (Rearranged) |
| 26. | "바보 (Unforgettable)" |
| 27. | "주문 (Mirotic)" |
| 28. | "여름날 (Hi Ya Ya)" (Rearranged) |
| 29. | "Summer Dream" |
| 30. | "Sky" |
| 31. | "Ment" |
| 32. | "I'll Be There" |
| 33. | "Closing Ment" |
| 34. | "Special Feature - Concert Making Film" |
