= B.U.T (Be-Au-Ty) / Back to Tomorrow =

Promotional single by Tohoshinki

from the album Tone
- Language: Japanese
- Released: September 21, 2011
- Recorded: 2011
- Genre: J-pop; electropop
- Length: 3:35 (B.U.T); 3:39 (Back to Tomorrow)
- Label: Avex Trax
- Songwriters: Yoo Young-jin, Ryan Jun, Antwann Frost (B.U.T); White N3rd, Paul Lewis (Back to Tomorrow)
- Producers: Yoo Young-jin (B.U.T); White N3rd (Back to Tomorrow)

"B.U.T (BE-AU-TY) / Back to Tomorrow" is a double A-sided digital single released by South Korean pop duo Tohoshinki. It was released on September 21, 2011, by Avex Trax as a pre-release single for their fifth Japanese album, Tone.

"B.U.T" was certified Gold by the Recording Industry Association of Japan (RIAJ) in January 2014.

== Promotion and live performances ==
On August 15, 2011, "Back to Tomorrow" was announced to be the theme song of a commercial for Menards ILLUNEIGE, a Japanese cosmetics brand. A preview of the song was released that same day. On August 27, Tohoshinki released the official track list for Tone, which included "Back to Tomorrow" and "B.U.T," the album's pre-release lead single.

Tohoshinki debuted their first performance of "B.U.T" at the SM Town World Tour in Tokyo Dome on September 2, 2011. Following their Tokyo Dome performance, Tohoshinki released a preview of the PV for "B.U.T" on September 6. The duo officially started their promotions for the song with a performance of "B.U.T" on the popular Japanese music television program Music Station on September 16, and the song's full PV was released on September 19. Tohoshinki officially released "B.U.T" and "Back to Tomorrow" on September 21 via online retailers. On October 2, Tohoshinki performed the song on Nippon TV's Music Lovers.

"B.U.T" has been one of the most-performed songs by the duo since its release in September 2011. They performed it at their 2012 Japan tour Tone, 2014 Japan tour Tree, and their 2015 Japan tour With. They also performed a Korean-language version of "B.U.T" for their 2012–13 world tour Catch Me and their 2014–15 tenth anniversary tour, Tistory. The Korean version of "B.U.T" was released as a bonus studio track for their live album, Live World Tour: Catch Me in Seoul, released in May 2014.

== Track listings ==
- Digital download single
1. "B.U.T (BE-AU-TY)" – 3:35
2. "Back to Tomorrow" – 3:39

== Credits ==
Credits adapted from "Tone" liner notes.

"B.U.T (BE-AU-TY)"

- Tohoshinki – lead vocals, background vocals
- Yoo Young-jin – producer, songwriter, director, background vocals, recording, mixing
- Ryan Jhun – songwriter
- Antwann Frost – songwriter
- Luna – lyrics

"Back to Tomorrow"

- Tohoshinki – lead vocals, background vocals
- White N3rd – producer, songwriter
- Paul Lewis – songwriter
- Katsutoshi Yasuhara – director
- Naoki Yamada – mixing
- Hideaki Jinbu – recording
- Shinjiroh Inoue – lyrics

== Charts ==
=== Weekly charts ===
"B.U.T (Be-Au-Ty)"

Chart (2011)	Peak position
Billboard Japan Hot 100"	65
RIAJ Digital Track Chart	9

"Back to Tomorrow"

Chart (2011)	Peak position
Billboard Japan Hot 100"	94
RIAJ Digital Track Chart	17
