= Tone: Live Tour 2012 =

2012 concert tour by Tohoshinki

- Tour by Tohoshinki
- Location: Japan
- Associated album: Tone
- Start date: January 18, 2012
- End date: April 23, 2012
- No. of shows: 26
- Box office: US$93.2 million

Tohoshinki concert chronology
- The Secret Code: 4th Live Tour 2009 (2009); Tone: Live Tour 2012 (2012); Catch Me: Live World Tour (2012–13)

Tone: Live Tour 2012 (stylized as Tohohsinki Live Tour 2012 ～TONE～), also known as the Tone Tour, was the fifth Japanese concert tour (eighth overall) by South Korean pop group Tohoshinki, in support of their fifth Japanese studio album Tone (2011). The Tone Tour was Tohoshinki's first concert in three years, and the first tour by the group since becoming a two-piece band with members Yunho and Changmin.

The tour ran for 26 shows, visiting ten cities in Japan. The Tone Tour attracted over 550,000 people, the highest attendance for a music concert by a Korean artist in Japan at the time. Tohoshinki broke their own record the following year with their Time: Live Tour 2013, which drew in 850,000 people.

== Background ==
Live Tour 2012: Tone was first announced through Tohoshinki's official website in December 2011. Originally scheduled for only 20 shows, six more dates were added throughout the duration of the tour. Tohoshinki were the third foreign artists, and the first Korean artists, to headline a concert at the Tokyo Dome for three days in a row, performing to over 165,000 people in three days.

== Commercial performance ==
According to SM Entertainment, the tour grossed US$73.8 million in ticket sales and US$19.4 million in merchandise, bringing the total gross to US$93.2 million.

== Setlist ==
This setlist is representative of their first show in Yokohama. It does not represent all dates throughout the tour.

1. "B.U.T. (BE-AU-TY)"
2. "Superstar"
3. "I Think U Know"
4. "Jumon -Mirotic-" (呪文 -MIROTIC-) (Japanese version)
5. "Toki o Tomete" (時ヲ止メテ)
6. "Thank You My Girl"
7. "Introduction ~magenta~"
8. "MAXIMUM" (Japanese version)
9. "Honey Funny Bunny" (Yunho solo) (Japanese version)
10. "Before U Go" (Japanese version)
11. "Duet"
12. "I Don't Know"
13. "Telephone"
14. "Shiawase Iro no Hana" (シアワセ色の花)
15. "Back to Tomorrow"
16. "Rusty Nail" (Changmin solo)
17. "BREAK OUT!"
18. "Easy Mind"
19. "Summer Dream"
20. "High Time"
21. "Why? (Keep Your Head Down)" (Japanese version)

Encore

22. "Rising Sun" (Japanese version)
23. "STILL"
24. "Shine"
25. "Weep"
26. "Somebody to Love"

== Tour dates ==
List of concerts, showing date, city, venue, and tickets sold
Date	City	Venue	Attendance
January 18, 2012	Yokohama	Yokohama Arena	—N/a
January 19, 2012	Yokohama	Yokohama Arena	—N/a
January 25, 2012	Nagoya	Nippon Gaishi Hall	—N/a
January 26, 2012	Nagoya	Nippon Gaishi Hall	—N/a
January 27, 2012	Nagoya	Nippon Gaishi Hall	—N/a
February 11, 2012	Fukuoka	Marine Messe Fukuoka	—N/a
February 12, 2012	Fukuoka	Marine Messe Fukuoka	—N/a
February 18, 2012	Niigata	Toki Messe	—N/a
February 19, 2012	Niigata	Toki Messe	—N/a
February 23, 2012	Sapporo	Hokkaido Prefectural Sports Center	—N/a
February 24, 2012	Sapporo	Hokkaido Prefectural Sports Center	—N/a
March 3, 2012	Hiroshima	Hiroshima Green Arena	—N/a
March 4, 2012	Hiroshima	Hiroshima Green Arena	—N/a
March 9, 2012	Fukui	Sun Dome Fukui	—N/a
March 10, 2012	Fukui	Sun Dome Fukui	—N/a
March 13, 2012	Osaka	Osaka-jō Hall	—N/a
March 14, 2012	Osaka	Osaka-jō Hall	—N/a
March 17, 2012	Saitama	Saitama Super Arena	111,000
March 18, 2012	Saitama	Saitama Super Arena	111,000
March 19, 2012	Saitama	Saitama Super Arena	111,000
April 14, 2012	Tokyo	Tokyo Dome	165,000
April 15, 2012	Tokyo	Tokyo Dome	165,000
April 16, 2012	Tokyo	Tokyo Dome	165,000
April 21, 2012	Osaka	Kyocera Osaka Dome	109,000
April 22, 2012	Osaka	Kyocera Osaka Dome	109,000
April 23, 2012	Osaka	Kyocera Osaka Dome	109,000
Total			~550,000
