= Journey / Is It OK? =

"Journey / ...Is It OK?"
- Paradise Ranch OST Part 1 cover art

Single by TVXQ (feat. Seohyun) and f(x)

from the album Paradise Ranch OST
- A-side: "Journey" - TVXQ feat. Seohyun
- B-side: "...Is It OK?" - f(x)
- Released: January 26, 2011
- Recorded: 2010 at S.M. Studios, Seoul
- Genre: Pop, dance, R&B
- Length: 7:42
- Label: S.M. Entertainment
- Songwriters: Kim Dal Woo, Hwang Hyun
- Producers: Kim Dal-woo, Hwang Hyun

TVXQ singles chronology
"Keep Your Head Down" (2011)	"Journey / ...Is It OK?" (2011)	"Before U Go" (2011)

f(x) singles chronology
"Mr. Boogie" (2010)	"Is It OK?" (2011)	"Pinocchio (Danger)" (2011)

"Journey / ...Is It OK?" is the first A-side and B-side digital single to be released from the soundtrack album of SBS's TV drama Paradise Ranch. It was released on January 26, 2011 under the record label of S.M. Entertainment. The A-side track "Journey" was performed by TVXQ's U-Know Yunho and Max Changmin featuring Seohyun of Girls' Generation. The B-side track "...Is It OK?" (좋아해도 되나요; lit. 'Can It Be Love?') was performed by Korean-Chinese girl group f(x). Both songs were later included in the Paradise Ranch OST which was released on February 9, 2011.

== Background and development ==
On January 5, 2011, TVXQ made their return to local music industry with their fifth Korean studio album Keep Your Head Down after a two years long hiatus. They returned as a duo after three members left to promote separately as JYJ under a different record agency. The split-up was due to the lawsuit that they filed against their former agency S.M. Entertainment. Due to their return after a long time much hype was created by their fans Cassiopeia. Meanwhile, Girls' Generation's youngest member Seohyun was also making headlines for ending her year-long 'on-screen marriage' with Jung Yong-hwa and leaving the popular reality show We Got Married. Yonghwa's first solo single "For First Time Lovers", which he dedicated to and performed with Seohyun, had reached spot 1 on Gaon Single Chart. In early October 2010, the agency also revealed that they would be co-producing TV romantic drama series Paradise Ranch for the Seoul Broadcasting System which will start airing its run early in 2011. The drama starred TVXQ's member Shim Changmin as Han Dong-joo, and fellow label-mate Lee Yeon-hee as Lee Da-ji.

=== "Journey" ===
On January 11, 2011, through the popular K-Pop international news site Allkpop, it came into public notice that Seohyun was going to make a featuring in one of the tracks, "Journey", from the standard edition of Keep Your Head Down which was due to release the next day. The record label agency S.M. Entertainment further elaborated that "Journey is a song that expresses the excitement of going on a vacation with someone you love. Fans will be able to hear the harmonization between TVXQ and Seohyun." The special CD edition album, which was released on January 5, 2011, did not include the collaboration track. "Journey" was later used as the ending theme song for the Paradise Ranch that began airing its run on January 24, 2011. The song was composed by the music producer Kim Dal Woo who also penned the lyrics.

=== "Is It OK?" ===
On January 25, 2011, an audio teaser for the soundtrack contribution featuring f(x) quickly spread across community sites. The news excited many fans because it marked the return of member Amber Liu to the Korean music industry. Taiwanese American Amber was rumored to have left the group months ago due to her ankle injury in 2010 and since then had been residing in Los Angeles (her hometown) for treatment purposes. The audio teaser was actually a part of the song which was used in the first episode of Paradise Ranch.

On January 26, 2011, the name of the song was revealed to be "Is It OK? (Can It Be Love?)" after it was digitally released along with "Journey" through various music sites. The song musically belongs to pop-dance genre and was produced by the songwriter Hwang Hyun, who also wrote its lyrics. According to Naver, the song speaks of the person who has hid their true feelings from their crush and is confused whether it is love.

== Release ==
The digital single was released under the name of "Paradise Ranch OST Part 1" and made available for music download through various music portal sites like Naver, Daum, Soribada and iTunes. on January 26, 2011 under the record label of S.M. Entertainment. Both tracks, "Journey" and "...Is It OK?", from the single were later included in the Paradise Ranch OST as tracks 2 and 5 respectively. The soundtrack album was released digitally on February 9, 2011. The physical CD version of the album was released two days later on February 11, 2011. "Journey" was also included as a bonus track in the repackage of TVXQ's fifth Korean studio album Keep Your Head Down, while "...Is It OK?" was later included as a bonus track in the Hot Summer repackage of their first Korean studio album Pinocchio.

== Track listing ==
Paradise Ranch OST Part 1
No.	Title	Lyrics	Music	Artist	Length
1.	"Journey" (feat. Seohyun)	Kim Dal Woo	Kim Dal Woo	TVXQ, Seohyun	4:33
2.	"좋아해도 되나요 (...Is It OK?)" (Can It Be Love?)	Hwang Hyun	Hwang Hyun	f(x)	3:09
Total length:					7:42

== Chart performance ==
Release date	Album/Single	Song title	Gaon Chart Weekly Singles	
Release date	Album/Single	Song title	Debut position	Peak position
January 9, 2011	Keep Your Head Down (standard edition)	Track 11: "Journey" (featuring Seohyun)	172	172
January 26, 2011	Paradise Ranch OST (Part 1)	Track 1: "Journey" (featuring Seohyun) (re-entry)	124	111
January 26, 2011	Paradise Ranch OST (Part 1)	Track 2: "좋아해도 되나요 (...Is It OK?)"	108	108

== See also ==
- Paradise Ranch
