= List of Oricon number-one albums of 2011 =

The highest-selling albums and extended plays (EPs) in Japan are ranked on the Oricon Weekly Chart, which is published by Oricon Style magazine. The data are compiled by Oricon based upon weekly physical album sales. In 2011, a total of 45 albums claimed the top position of the Oricon Weekly Chart.

== Chart history ==
Key
| † | Indicates Oricon best-selling album of 2011 |

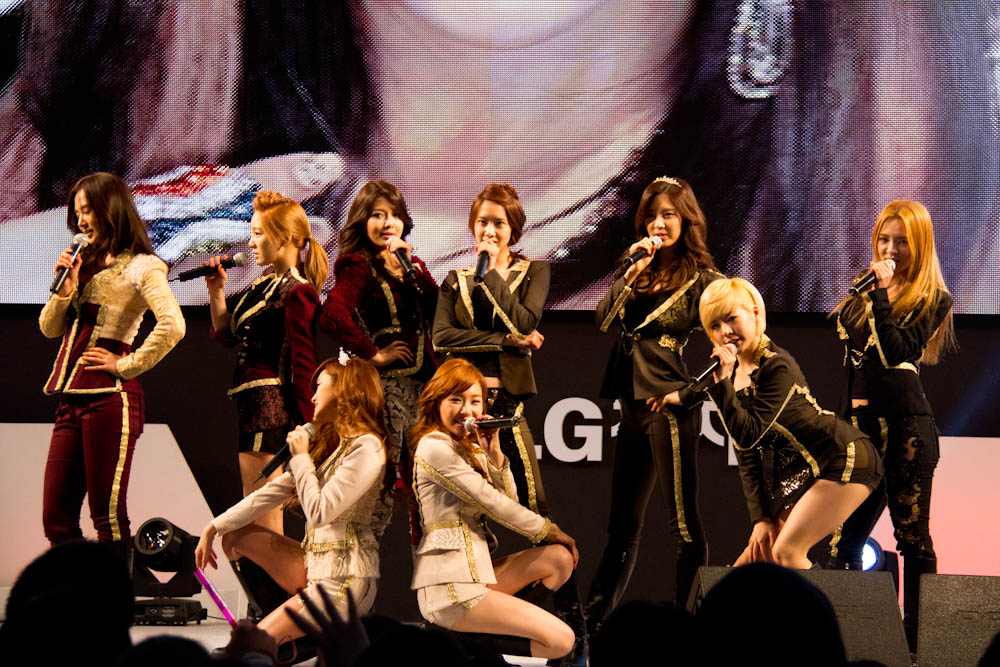
South Korean bubblegum pop girl group Girls' Generation became the first non-Japanese girl group to earn a number-one album on the chart.

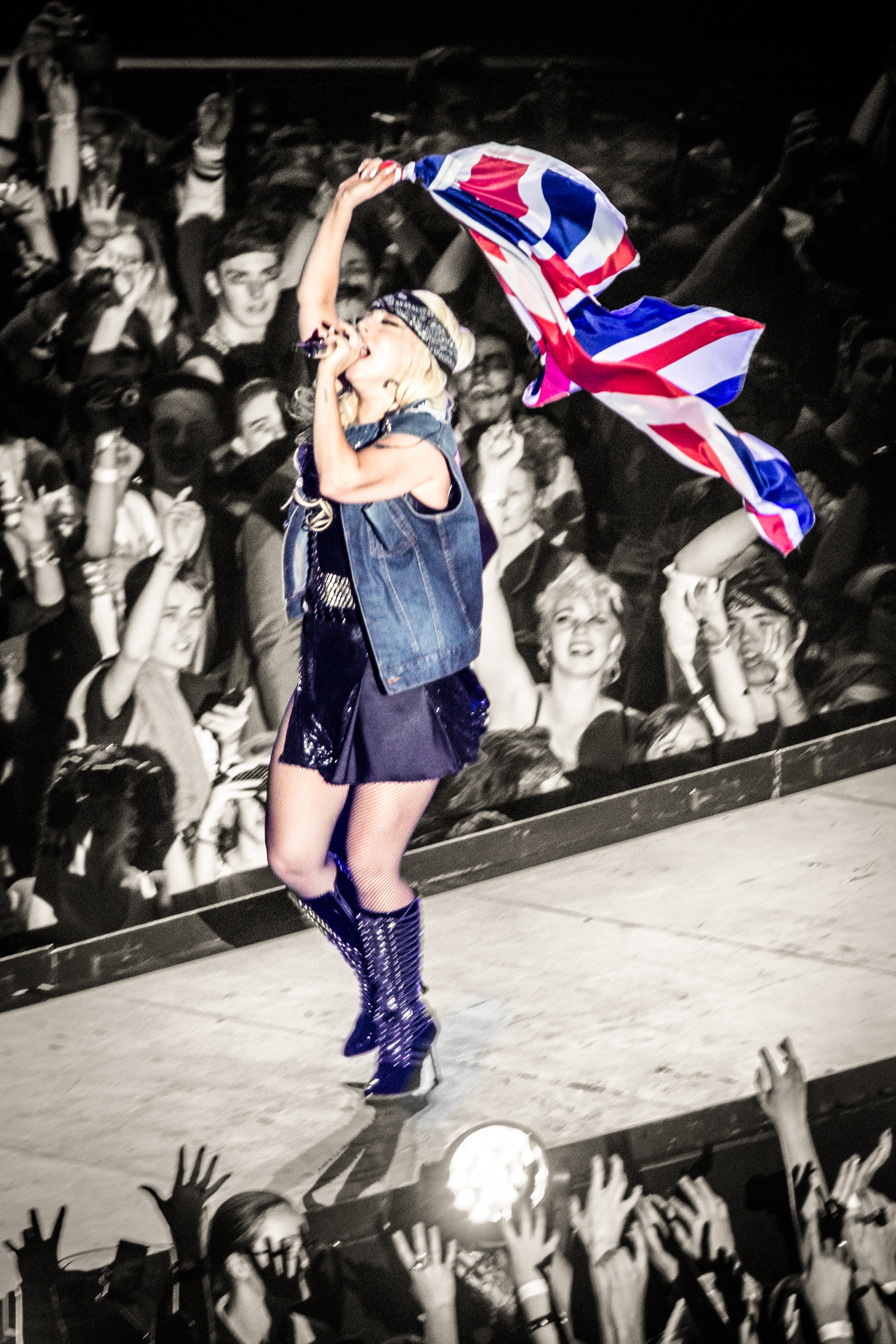
American pop singer Lady Gaga scored her first Oricon number-one album with Born This Way, which became 2011 best-selling album by a Western female artist.

| Issue date | Album | Artist(s) | Ref. |
|---|---|---|---|
| January 3 | Love Songs | Ayumi Hamasaki | |
| January 10 | No Sleeves | No3b | |
| January 17 | Ikimonobakari: Members Best Selection | Ikimono-gakari | |
| January 24 | You Can't Catch Me | Maaya Sakamoto | |
| January 31 | Exit Tunes Presents Vocalonexus feat. Hatsune Miku | Various artists | |
| February 7 | Supergood, Superbad | Tomohisa Yamashita | |
| February 14 | Ano.. Yume Motemasu Kedo. (あの・・夢もてますケド。) | Yusuke | |
| February 21 | Ano.. Yume Motemasu Kedo. (あの・・夢もてますケド。) | Yusuke | |
| February 28 | 2 -Ni- | Yuzu | |
| March 7 | Musicman | Keisuke Kuwata | |
| March 14 | Dejavu | Kumi Koda | |
| March 21 | Negai no Tō (願いの塔, Wish Tower) | Exile | |
| March 28 | Ketsunopolis 7 (ケツノポリス7) | Ketsumeishi | |
| April 4 | Negai no Tō | Exile | |
| April 11 | Negai no Tō | Exile | |
| April 18 | Guitarissimo | Miwa | |
| April 25 | The Apples | Kazuya Yoshii | |
| May 2 | Dōmo (どーも) | Kazumasa Oda | |
| May 9 | Checkmate! | Namie Amuro | |
| May 16 | Checkmate! | Namie Amuro | |
| May 23 | Big Bang 2 | Big Bang | |
| May 30 | Five Treasure Island | F.T. Island | |
| June 6 | Born This Way | Lady Gaga | |
| June 13 | Girls' Generation | Girls' Generation | |
| June 20 | Koko ni Ita Koto | AKB48 | |
| June 27 | Mind Travel | Superfly | |
| July 4 | Thank You, Love | Kana Nishino | |
| July 11 | Dai Hakken | Tokyo Jihen | |
| July 18 | Beautiful World † | Arashi | |
| July 25 | You | Juju | |
| August 1 | You | Juju | |
| August 8 | C'mon | B'z | |
| August 15 | M Best | Miliyah Kato | |
| August 22 | Ray of Hope | Tatsuro Yamashita | |
| August 29 | SMAP Aid | SMAP | |
| September 5 | Megaphonic | Yuki | |
| September 12 | Five | Ayumi Hamasaki | |
| September 19 | Five | Ayumi Hamasaki | |
| September 26 | ♯AAABest | AAA | |
| October 3 | Nolza | 2NE1 | |
| October 10 | Tone | TVXQ | |
| October 17 | A.N.Jell with TBS Kei Kinyō Drama “Ikemen Desune” Music Collection (A.N.JELL WITH TBS系金曜ドラマ『美男ですね』MUSIC COLLECTION) | A.N.Jell | |
| October 24 | 8Eight8 | Kaela Kimura | |
| October 31 | Tegomass no Mahō (テゴマスのまほう, Tegomass's Magic) | Tegomass | |
| November 7 | Never More -Reincarnation:PERSONA4- (ネバー・モア－「ペルソナ4」輪廻転生－) | Shoji Meguro & Shihoko Hirata for Persona 4 | |
| November 14 | How Crazy Your Love | Yui | |
| November 21 | K Album | KinKi Kids | |
| November 28 | Fight | Kanjani Eight | |
| December 5 | Super Girl | Kara | |
| December 12 | JPN | Perfume | |
| December 19 | Test Drive | Jin Akanishi featuring Jason Derulo | |
| December 26 | Super Girl | Kara | |

== See also ==
- 2011 in music
