= Catch Me (TVXQ album) =

Studio album by TVXQ
- Released: September 24, 2012
- Recorded: 2012
- Studio: SM Studios (Seoul, South Korea)
- Genre: K-pop; R&B; electronica; dance; metal; dubstep; experimental
- Length: 41:00
- Language: Korean
- Label: SM
- Producer: Hitchhiker; Hwang Chan-hee; Hwang Hyun; Kenzie; Kim Tae-sung; The Underdogs; Yim Gwang-wook; Yoo Young-jin

TVXQ chronology
Tone (2011)	Catch Me (2012)	Time (2013)

Singles from Catch Me
- 1. "Catch Me" Released: September 24, 2012

Repackage edition cover
- Humanoids repackage album cover

Singles from Humanoids
- 1. "Humanoids" Released: November 26, 2012

Catch Me is the sixth Korean studio album (eleventh overall) by South Korean pop duo TVXQ. It was digitally released on September 24, 2012, followed by a physical CD release on September 26, 2012, by SM Entertainment and KMP Holdings. The album is a follow-up to their 2011 release Keep Your Head Down, which was TVXQ's first album since becoming a two-piece band with members U-Know Yunho and Max Changmin.

The album spawned two lead singles, "Catch Me" and "Humanoids", the latter being the lead single off of Catch Me's repackage Humanoids, which was released on November 26, 2012. The repackaged edition also features dubstep track "Here I Stand." To support the album, TVXQ embarked on their first world tour, Catch Me World Tour, starting with two shows at Olympic Gymnastics Arena in Seoul in November 2012.

Catch Me is South Korea's third best-selling album of 2012. According to the Gaon Chart, Catch Me has sold 259,425 copies in South Korea as of March 2013, and an additional 47,181 copies in Japan, according to the Oricon.

== Background, singles and music videos ==
On September 19 Changmin's teaser photo was released showing him with a mystic and intense look. The title track "Catch Me" is a powerful electropop with an orchestral melody, dubstep sound and house beats. It is about a self-respect man, who says good-bye to his lover but actually wants to hold onto her. On September 21 the teaser for the music video of "Catch Me" was released on their official YouTube channel. This was followed by the released of the full MV on the same day as the online release of the album.

Coinciding with the release of the repackage, lead single "Humanoids" was released on November 26, 2012. Produced and written by Kenzie, "Humanoids" is a mid-tempo EDM song with low-strung vocals, a higher range chorus, and robotic cadences. The lyrics are rather cynical – though it talks of rebuilding a better future, the new generation is stained with daunting fragments of the past.

The music video premiered on YouTube on November 26, featuring members U-Know Yunho and Max Changmin dancing in a dark futuristic backdrop. The choreography was created by NappyTabs. The music video was noted for its dystopian-like steampunk imagery. While the background maintained its washed-out gray undertone, Yunho and Changmin were dressed in color. Changmin wore bright colors, while Yunho carried darker attires, and the duo's contrasts in colors were maintained throughout the video. "Humanoids" underperformed on digital charts, peaking at number 32 on the Gaon Singles Chart with only around 157,000 downloads.

The third track "Here I Stand", produced and written by Kim Young-hu, is an upbeat, dubstep ballad. The lyrics describe the feelings of a long-distance relationship.

== Promotion and reception ==
Professional ratings
Review scores
Source	Rating
IZM	3/5 stars

The duo made their comeback on October 5 on KBS Music Bank. They performed their title track "Catch Me", and "I Don′t Know". This was followed by appearances on October 6 and 7 on MBC Show! Music Core and SBS Inkigayo, respectively.

Catch Me ranked number one on Gaon Album Chart for three consecutive weeks and again a week later but ranked second for the month of September selling 131,882 copies. In October it peaked at number one with 114,956 copies, selling a cumulative total of 246,838 copies.

On November 17, TVXQ performed "Humanoids" for the first time at their two-day concert in Seoul, South Korea, the first leg of their Live World Tour: Catch Me. On November 19, the teaser for "Humanoids" was unveiled online, followed by the announcement of the repackage album, which was released on November 26.

== Track listing ==
Catch Me track list
No.	Title	Lyrics	Music	Arrangement	Length
1.	"Catch Me"	Yoo Young-jin	Yoo Young-jin	Yoo Young-jin	4:36
2.	"Viva" (인생은 빛났다; Insaeng-eun Binnatda; lit. My Life Started to Shine)	Kenzie	Harvey Mason Jr.; Damon Thomas	The Underdogs	3:15
3.	"Destiny"	Kim Eana	Tesung Kim (Iconic Sounds); Im Kwang-wook (Devine Channel); Andrew Choi	Tesung Kim (Iconic Sounds); Im Kwang-wook (Devine Channel)	3:51
4.	"Like a Soap" (비누처럼; Binu Cheoreom)	Kenzie	Kim Jeong-bae; Kenzie	Kenzie	3:28
5.	"I Don’t Know" (Korean version)	Kim Boo-min	Hitchhiker	Hitchhiker	3:23
6.	"Dream" (꿈; Kkum) (Chanimini cover)	Jo Kwang-ho	Park Jung-won	Hwang Chan-hee; Yang Si-on	3:53
7.	"How Are You"	Hwang Hyun (MonoTree)	Hwang Hyun (MonoTree)	Hwang Hyun (MonoTree)	4:02
8.	"Getaway"	Kim Boo-min	Hitchhiker	Hitchhiker	3:33
9.	"I Swear"	Max Changmin	Marcos "Mazeland" Ubeda	Hwang Hyun (MonoTree)	3:44
10.	"Gorgeous"	Kim Jeong-bae	Kenzie; Andrew Choi	Kenzie	3:31
11.	"Good Night"	Yoo Young-jin	Yoo Young-jin; Yoo Han-jin	Yoo Han-jin	3:44
Total length:					41:00

Humanoids repackage track list
No.	Title	Lyrics	Music	Arrangement	Length
1.	"Humanoids"	Lee Kyung-nam; Lee Sol-bi	Thomas Troelsen; Kenzie	Thomas Troelsen; Donald "haZEL" Sales	3:29
2.	"Catch Me"	Yoo Young-jin	Yoo Young-jin	Yoo Young-jin	4:36
3.	"Here I Stand"	Young-hu Kim	Young-hu Kim	Young-hu Kim	4:09
4.	"Viva" (인생은 빛났다; Insaeng-eun Binnatda; lit. My Life Started to Shine)	Kenzie	Harvey Mason Jr.; Damon Thomas	The Underdogs	3:15
5.	"Destiny"	Kim Eana	Tesung Kim (Iconic Sounds); Im Kwang-wook (Devine Channel); Andrew Choi	Tesung Kim (Iconic Sounds); Im Kwang-wook (Devine Channel)	3:51
6.	"Like a Soap" (비누처럼; Binu Cheoreom)	Kenzie	Kim Jeong-bae; Kenzie	Kenzie	3:28
7.	"I Don’t Know" (Korean version)	Kim Boo-min	Hitchhiker	Hitchhiker	3:23
8.	"Dream" (꿈; Kkum) (Chanimini cover)	Jo Kwang-ho	Park Jung-won	Hwang Chan-hee; Yang Si-on	3:53
9.	"How Are You"	Hwang Hyun (MonoTree)	Hwang Hyun (MonoTree)	Hwang Hyun (MonoTree)	4:02
10.	"Getaway"	Kim Boo-min	Hitchhiker	Hitchhiker	3:33
11.	"I Swear"	Max Changmin	Marcos "Mazeland" Ubeda	Hwang Hyun (MonoTree)	3:44
12.	"Gorgeous"	Kim Jeong-bae	Kenzie; Andrew Choi	Kenzie	3:31
13.	"Good Night"	Yoo Young-jin	Yoo Young-jin; Yoo Han-jin	Yoo Han-jin	3:44
Total length:					48:40

== Charts ==
=== Weekly charts ===
Chart performance for Catch Me & Humanoids
Chart (2012)	Peak position	
Chart (2012)	Catch Me	Humanoids
South Korean Albums (Gaon)	1	1
Japanese Albums (Oricon)	1	–
Taiwanese East Asian Albums (G-Music)	4	2
US World Albums (Billboard)	6	–

=== Monthly charts ===
Chart performance for Catch Me
Chart (2012)	Peak position
South Korean Albums (Gaon)	1
Japanese Albums (Oricon)	12

=== Year-end charts ===
Chart positions for Catch Me & Humanoids
Chart (2012)	Position	
Chart (2012)	Catch Me	Humanoids
South Korean Albums (Gaon)	3	18

== Sales ==
Country	Month	Catch Me		Ref.
Country	Month	Sales	Accumulated sales	Ref.
South Korea (Gaon)	September	131,882	131,882	
South Korea (Gaon)	October	114,956	246,838	
South Korea (Gaon)	November	8,131	254,969	
South Korea (Gaon)	December	1,478	256,447	
Total	259,425 (until March 2013)			

Country	Album	Sales	Ref.
Japan (Oricon)	Catch Me	33,549	

== Release history ==
Release formats for Catch Me
Region	Date	Format	Version	Label
South Korea	September 24, 2012	Digital download	Regular edition	S.M. Entertainment
South Korea	September 26, 2012	CD	Regular edition	S.M. Entertainment
South Korea	October 24, 2012	CD+DVD	Special edition	S.M. Entertainment
Taiwan	September 24, 2012	Digital download	Regular edition	Avex Taiwan
Taiwan	November 9, 2012	CD	Regular edition	Avex Taiwan
Taiwan	November 30, 2012	CD+DVD	Special edition	Avex Taiwan
Philippines	December 15, 2012	CD	Regular edition	Universal Records

Release formats for Humanoid
Regions	Dates	Format(s)	Label(s)
Worldwide	November 26, 2012	CD; digital download	S.M. Entertainment
South Korea	November 26, 2012	CD; digital download	S.M. Entertainment
Taiwan	November 26, 2012	Digital download	Avex Taiwan
Taiwan	December 21, 2012	CD	Avex Taiwan

== See also ==
- TVXQ albums discography
- List of number-one albums of 2012 (South Korea)
