= Catch Me: Live World Tour =

2012–13 concert tour by TVXQ

- World tour by TVXQ
- Promotional poster for the tour in Seoul
- Associated album: Catch Me
- Start date: November 17, 2012
- End date: July 20, 2013
- Legs: 4
- No. of shows: 6 in Asia; 1 in North America; 1 in South America; 8 in total
- Website: tvxq.smtown.com

TVXQ concert chronology
- Tone: Live Tour 2012 (2012); Catch Me: Live World Tour (2012–13); Time: Live Tour 2013 (2013)

The Catch Me: Live World Tour (stylized as TVXQ! Live World Tour "Catch Me"), also known as the Catch Me World Tour, was the fourth world concert tour (ninth overall) by South Korean pop duo TVXQ, to support their sixth studio album, Catch Me (2012). The world tour commenced with two shows in Seoul in November 2012. The tour visited seven theatres, arenas, and stadiums from late 2012 through mid-2013 in 8 different countries.

== Background ==
Tour logo

The Catch Me tour marks the group's first tour since their last Asia-wide concert tour, the Mirotic Tour, in February 2009. The two concerts in South Korea will be TVXQ's first concert after the lawsuit between members Jaejoong, Yoochun and Junsu with S.M. Entertainment, and first exclusive concert in four years in Korea. The concert will take place over two days starting from November 17.

The 20,000 tickets for the Seoul concerts were sold out within two minutes of going on sale at 20:00 on October 18. The Beijing concert was played to an audience of 15,000 people. It was announced on February 19, 2013, by JPM Music on their website and Facebook page that TVXQ would be performing on May 18, 2013, at Stadium Malawati, Shah Alam in Malaysia. It is JPM Music's first K-Pop concert. This is the first TVXQ concert in Malaysia as a duo and first concert after 6 years.

== Broadcasts and recordings ==
TVXQ's first two performances of the tour at the Olympic Gymnastics Arena in Seoul, South Korea was recorded and put on a DVD and a CD. The live album was released on May 22, 2014, comprising two previously unreleased studio tracks: a Korean version of TVXQ's 2011 Japanese digital single "B.U.T. (Be-Au-Ty)" and a Korean remake of their 30th Japanese single, "Toki o Tomete", which was released in 2010. The album debuted at number three on the Gaon Albums Chart and shifted 19,979 units by the end of the month. The DVD version of the tour was released on August 14, 2014.

== Setlist ==
This setlist is representative of the shows in Seoul on November 17–18, 2012 and Hong Kong on January 19, 2013. It does not represent all concerts for the duration of the tour.

1. "Rising Sun"
2. "Getaway"
3. "Hey! (Don't Bring Me Down)"
4. "'O'-Jung.Ban.Hap."
5. "Like a Soap"
6. "How Are You"
7. "Journey"
8. Max Changmin solo: "Confession" (in Seoul) and "Listen to the Sea" (in Hong Kong)
9. U-Know Yunho solo: "Honey Funny Bunny"
10. "Wrong Number"
11. "I Don't Know" (Korean version)
12. "Humanoids"
13. "Purple Line" (Korean version)
14. "Before U Go"
15. "Destiny"
16. Medley: "Everlasting" (Korean version of "Toki o Tomete") / "I Never Let Go" / "Always There..." / "Like Right Now"
17. "I Wanna Hold You"
18. "Here I Stand"
19. "Dream"
20. "Catch Me"
21. "B.U.T (Be-Au-Ty)"
22. "Keep Your Head Down"
23. "Unforgettable"

Encore

24. "Mirotic"
25. "Summer Dream"
26. "Sky"
27. "Hi Ya Ya"
28. "I'll Be There"

== Tour dates ==
Date	City	Country	Venue	Attendance
November 17, 2012	Seoul	South Korea	Olympic Gymnastics Arena	25,000
November 18, 2012	Seoul	South Korea	Olympic Gymnastics Arena	25,000
January 19, 2013	Hong Kong	China	AsiaWorld–Arena	10,000
March 30, 2013	Beijing	China	Capital Indoor Stadium	10,000
May 18, 2013	Kuala Lumpur	Malaysia	Malawati Stadium	9,000
July 5, 2013	Los Angeles	United States	Nokia Theatre L.A.	7,000
July 7, 2013	Santiago	Chile	Teatro Caupolicán	5,000
July 20, 2013	Shanghai	China	Mercedes-Benz Arena	10,000
Total				76,000

== Cancelled shows ==
Date	City	Country	Venue	Reason for cancellation
July 9, 2013	Lima	Peru	Jockey Club del Perú	Technical and logistical problems

== Personnel ==
- Tour organizer: SM Entertainment
