= Stay with Me Tonight (TVXQ song) =

Single by Tohoshinki

from the album Heart, Mind and Soul
- B-side: "Try My Love"
- Released: April 27, 2005
- Genre: J-pop; R&B; dance
- Label: Rhythm Zone
- Songwriter: Kei Haneoka
- Producer: Max Matsuura

Tohoshinki singles chronology
"Magic Castle" (2004)	"Stay with Me Tonight" (2005)	"Hi Ya Ya Summer Day" (2005)

Music video
- "Stay with Me Tonight" on YouTube

"Stay with Me Tonight" is the debut Japanese single recorded by South Korean pop group Tohoshinki, taken from their debut Japanese album, Heart, Mind and Soul (2006). Released on April 27, 2005 by Rhythm Zone, the song was written by Kei Haneoka and arranged by Maestro T. Taishi Fukuyama provided the instrument arrangements, and Masaya Wada performed the background vocals.

"Stay with Me Tonight" peaked at number 37 on the Oricon Singles Chart and sold 10,116 copies. The song was used as the ending theme for the television drama, Kusano Kid (草野☆キッド).

== Formats and track listings ==
- CD+DVD single RZCD-45184

Disc 1 (CD)

1. "Stay with Me Tonight"
2. "Try My Love"
3. "Stay with Me Tonight" (Less Vocal)
4. "Try My Love" (Less Vocal)

Disc 2 (DVD)

1. "Stay with Me Tonight" (Video Clip)
- CD single RZCD-45185
1. "Stay with Me Tonight"
2. "Try My Love"
3. "Stay with Me Tonight" (Less Vocal)
4. "Try My Love" (Less Vocal)

== Charts ==
Chart (2014)	Peak position
Japan (Oricon Singles Chart)	37

=== Sales ===
Released	Oricon chart	Peak	Sales total
April 27, 2005	Weekly Singles Chart	37	10,116

== Release history ==
Region	Date	Format	Label
Japan	April 27, 2005	CD; CD+DVD; digital download	Rhythm Zone
