= Paradise Ranch =

2011 South Korean television series

- Promotional poster
- Also known as: Paradise Farm; Paradise Meadow
- Genre: Romance, Drama
- Written by: Jang Hyun-joo; Seo Hee-jung
- Directed by: Kim Chul-kyu
- Starring: Lee Yeon-hee; Shim Chang-min
- Theme music composer: Lee Pil-ho
- Opening theme: "Paradise Ranch"
- Ending theme: "Journey" by TVXQ feat. Seohyun
- Composers: Lee Pil-ho; Park Geun-tae
- Country of origin: South Korea
- Original languages: Korean; English
- No. of episodes: 16

Production
- Production locations: Jeju, Australia
- Running time: 55 minutes on Mondays and Tuesdays at 20:55 (KST)
- Production companies: Samhwa Networks; SM Entertainment

Original release
- Network: Seoul Broadcasting System
- Release: 24 January – 15 March 2011

Related
- It's Okay, Daddy's Girl

Paradise Ranch (Korean: 파라다이스 목장; RR: Paradaiseu mokjang) is a 2011 South Korean television series that aired on SBS. It stars Lee Yeon-hee and Shim Chang-min as a divorced couple who married when they were 19, then meet six years later and rediscover their feelings for each other. It was filmed on location in Jeju and Australia.

== Synopsis ==
Han Dong-joo and Lee Da-ji were childhood friends who fell desperately in love and married at 19 after struggling to get their parents' approval. But they divorced after six months. Six years later, they meet coincidentally at a horse auction in Australia. When Dong-joo, the grandson of a tycoon, goes to Jeju Island to develop a resort, he ends up living with his ex-wife, who is now a horse veterinarian. They discover that their feelings for each other are still very much alive.

== Cast ==
Main characters

- Shim Chang-min as Han Dong-joo
- Lee Yeon-hee as Lee Da-ji
- Joo Sang-wook as Seo Yoon-ho
- Yoo Ha-na as Park Jin-young

Supporting characters

- Chun Ho-jin as Lee Eok-soo
- Im Soo-hyang as Lee Da-eun
- Jang Yong as Han Suk-sang
- Ahn Suk-hwan as Han Tae-man
- Na Young-hee as Lee Bok-shim
- Lee Si-eon as Secretary Lee
- Park Soo-hyun as Baek In-soo
- Lee Doo-il as Shim Soo-bong
- Yoon Ye-hee as Kang Yang-ja
- Choi Jong-yoon as Bang Jong-dae
- Jung Eun-pyo as President Yang
- Yoon Ji-min as Ji Mil-hye
- Jo Sung-ha as Jin-young's father
- Shin Pyo as Ki-tae
- Song Yoo-hyun as Yoo Song-yi
- Choi Soo-young as Tae-man's secretary (cameo, ep 3)
- Jin Tae-hyun (cameo)
- Yoon Ye-ri

== Music ==
Paradise Ranch: Original Soundtrack

Television theme by Various Artists
- Released: 11 February 2011
- Genre: Soundtrack
- Length: 49:49
- Label: S.M. Entertainment

Singles from Paradise Ranch: Original Soundtrack
- 1. "Journey / Is It Ok?" Released: 26 January 2011; 2. "My Only One / Waiting For You" Released: 31 January 2011

The show's theme song was composed by Lee Pil-ho and the score was composed by Lee Pil-ho and Park Geun-tae. The lyrics for "Confession" were written by Shim Chang-min and is taken from TVXQ's album, Keep Your Head Down. The song "Journey" was also from the same album. The soundtrack was first released in two parts, Part 1 on 26 January 2011 and Part 2 on 31 January 2011. The full original soundtrack was digitally released on 9 February 2011 and released in stores on 11 February 2011.

Paradise Ranch Original Soundtrack
No.	Title	Artist	Length
1.	"Paradise Ranch"	Lee Pil-ho	1:07
2.	"Journey"	TVXQ feat. Seohyun	4:33
3.	"My Only One"	BoA	4:23
4.	"Waiting For You"	Yesung	4:21
5.	"...Is It OK?"	f(x)	3:09
6.	"Confession"	Shim Chang-min	3:56
7.	"Running Through Ranch"	Lee Pil-ho	2:36
8.	"Kiss on the Flower"	Lee Pil-ho	3:23
9.	"Heigh-Ho"	Lee Pil-ho	1:32
10.	"Fantastic Dream"	Lee Pil-ho	1:08
11.	"Green Field"	Lee Pil-ho	2:25
12.	"First Feeling"	Lee Pil-ho	3:19
13.	"Leap Through Time"	Park Geun-tae	2:17
14.	"Sunny Days"	Park Geun-tae	1:49
15.	"Smile Waltz"	Park Geun-tae	2:08
16.	"Will You Marry Me?"	Park Geun-tae	2:40
17.	"Beautiful You"	Park Geun-tae	2:25
18.	"Reminiscences"	Park Geun-tae	2:28
Total length:			49:49

== Ratings ==
Date	Episode	Nationwide	Seoul
2011-01-24	01	7.8	< 9.1
2011-01-25	02	7.4	< 9.0
2011-01-31	03	7.7	10.2 (16th)
2011-02-01	04	6.2	< 8.0
2011-02-07	05	7.4	< 9.4
2011-02-08	06	7.0	< 8.9
2011-02-14	07	6.4	< 9.2
2011-02-15	08	6.6	< 8.6
2011-02-21	09	6.3	< 8.7
2011-02-22	10	6.0	< 8.6
2011-02-28	11	6.3	-
2011-03-01	12	7.0	< 8.9
2011-03-07	13	6.8	< 7.5
2011-03-08	14	6.9	< 7.7
2011-03-14	15	5.5	< 8.4
2011-03-15	16	5.6	< 7.9
Average		6.7%	-

== International broadcast ==
It aired in Japan on DATV in May 2011, on Fuji TV in November 2011, and on KNTV from 9 to 30 April 2012.

Though the series received low viewership ratings in the six to ten percent range during its domestic run, its DVD ranked high on Japan's Oricon weekly chart upon its release in November 2011. Shim Chang-min did the Japanese dubbing for his character on the DVD.

In Thailand aired on Thairath TV beginning 15 December 2015 on Tuesdays to Fridays at 9:00-10:00 a.m.
