= Superstar (TVXQ song) =

Single by Tohoshinki

from the album Tone
- B-side: "I Don't Know"
- Released: July 20, 2011
- Recorded: 2011
- Genre: J-pop
- Length: 3:43
- Label: Avex Trax
- Songwriters: Lars Halvor Jensen; Johannes Joergensen; Drew Ryan Scott; Lindy Robbins

Tohoshinki singles chronology
"Before U Go" (2011)	"Superstar" (2011)	"Winter Rose / Duet" (2011)

"Superstar" is a song recorded by South Korean pop duo Tohoshinki, taken from their fifth Japanese studio album, Tone (2011). It served as Tohoshinki's 32nd Japanese single, and their second as a duo. As the second and final single release for Tone, "Superstar" was released in four editions – a CD+DVD version, a CD only version, a Bigeast fan club edition, and an exclusive 7-Eleven edition – on July 20, 2011, by Avex Trax. The song "I Don't Know" was released as its B-side.

"Superstar" reached to number one on the Billboard Japan Hot 100 and number two on the Oricon Singles Chart. Within a week of its release, the single was certified gold by the Recording Industry Association of Japan (RIAJ) for shipments of over 100,000.

== Background ==
"Superstar" was originally written with English lyrics and titled "Everyday Superstar". When the song was translated into Japanese the lyrics and meaning were completely changed apart from the single word "Superstar". Co-writer Lars Halvor Jensen told HitQuarters that the translator kept it in because "it's a catchy word that everybody understands". The original English language song was recorded by the Irish pop duo Jedward and included on their second album Victory. It was also included as the bonus track on the Japanese release of their debut album Planet Jedward.

"Superstar" was featured in a Seven-net Shopping commercial.

== Music video ==
A music video for "Superstar" was shot, but was not included with the CD+DVD version of the single. It was later released on the album Tone. Both the music video's for "Superstar" and "I Don't Know" were included with the Tone as well as their respective dance versions.

== Chart performance ==
The single was released July 20, 2011, and sold 75,687 units on its first day of release. It peaked at #1 on the daily chart and #2 of the weekly chart on the Oricon chart. The single sold over 184,317 copies.

== Formats and track listings ==
- Japanese digital download single
1. "Superstar" – 3:43
2. "I Don't Know" – 3:25
- Japanese CD+DVD single AVCK-79027

Disc 1 (CD)

1. "Superstar"
2. "I Don't Know"
3. "Superstar" (Less Vocal)
4. "I Don't Know" (Less Vocal)

Disc 2 (DVD)

1. "I Don't Know" (Video Clip)
2. "I Don't Know" Off Shot Movie (First Press Limited Edition only)
- Japanese CD single AVCK-79028
1. "Superstar"
2. "I Don't Know"
3. "Superstar" (-Summer Heat Remix-)
4. "Superstar" (Less Vocal)
5. "I Don't Know" (Less Vocal)
- Japanese CD single (Bigeast limited edition) AVC1-79029
1. "Superstar"
2. "I Don't Know"
3. "Superstar" (Less Vocal)
4. "I Don't Know" (Less Vocal)
- Japanese CD+DVD single (7-Eleven edition) AVC1-79032

Disc 1 (CD)

1. "Superstar"
2. "I Don't Know"

Disc 2 (DVD)

1. Sogo Seibu's Silver Bear Silver Card TV-CM making
2. Seven-Net Shopping TV-CM making
3. 7-Eleven Fair TV-CM making

== Credits ==
- Vocals: Tohoshinki (Yunho & Changmin)
- Recording: Hideaki Jinbu (avex studio) ("Superstar") / JongPil Gu @ Yellowtail Studio ("I Don't Know")
  - Location: Avex Studio Azabu ("Superstar")/ Yellowtail Studio ("I Don't Know")
- Mix engineers: Naoki Yamada (I to I communications) ("Superstar")/ JongPil Gu @ Yellowtail Studio ("I Don't Know")
- Music: UTA for Tiny Voice Production ("Superstar")/ hitchhiker ("I Don't Know")
- Music director: Katsutoshi Yasuhara (AEI) ("Superstar")/ hitchhiker ("I Don't Know")

== Charts, peaks and certifications ==
=== Charts ===
Chart (2011)	Peak position
Japan Oricon Daily Singles Chart	1
Japan Oricon Weekly Singles Chart	2
Japan Oricon Monthly Singles Chart	7
Japan Oricon Yearly Singles Chart	41

=== Sales and certifications ===
Country	Provider	Sales	Certification
Japan	RIAJ	184,317+	Gold

== Release history ==
Country	Date	Label
Japan	July 20, 2011	Avex Trax
South Korea	August 8, 2011	SM Entertainment
Taiwan	August 13, 2011	Avex Asia Limited
Hong Kong	August 13, 2011	Avex Asia Limited
