= Tone (TVXQ album) =

Studio album by Tohoshinki
- Released: September 28, 2011
- Recorded: 2009–2011
- Genre: J-pop; electropop; dance-pop
- Length: 49:10
- Language: Japanese
- Label: Avex Trax
- Producer: Nam So-young (gen.); Ryuhei Chiba (gen.); Katsutoshi Yasuhara; Shinjiroh Inoue; Yoo Young-jin; Dsign Music; John Paul Lam; Michele Vice-Maslin; C.J. Vanston; The White N3rd; Hitchhiker; Deekay; Katsuhiko Yamamoto; Coach

Tohoshinki chronology
Before U Go (2011)	Tone (2011)	Catch Me (2012)

Singles from Tone
- 1. "Why? (Keep Your Head Down)" Released: January 26, 2011; 2. "Superstar" Released: July 20, 2011; 3. "B.U.T (Be-Au-Ty) / Back to Tomorrow" Released: September 21, 2011

Tone (stylized in all caps) is the fifth Japanese studio album (tenth overall) by South Korean pop group Tohoshinki, released on September 28, 2011, by Avex Trax. It is Tohoshinki's first Japanese album since becoming a Duo, with members Yunho and Changmin. Tone was released in three physical versions – Version A, a CD+DVD version with music videos; Version B, another CD+DVD version with off-shot movies; and Version C, a CD only version with a bonus track. Composing sessions for the album began in 2009, bull full production began in early 2011.

Musically, Tone is a pop music album largely consisting of uptempos, midtempos, and ballads with R&B, electropop and rock influences. Tone received positive reviews upon its release, with some critics praising it as one of Tohoshinki's most cohesive Japanese albums to-date. The album was a major commercial success: it was Tohoshinki's second album, but first original release, to top the Oricon Albums Chart, selling 205,000 copies on its first week of release. Earning a platinum certification by the Recording Industry Association of Japan (RIAJ) two weeks later, Tone eventually became Tohoshinki's best-selling original Japanese studio album, with over 330,000 copies sold.

== Background ==
The second single "Superstar" was originally written with English lyrics and titled "Everyday Superstar". When the song was translated into Japanese the lyrics and meaning were completely changed apart from the single word "Superstar". Co-writer Lars Halvor Jensen told HitQuarters that the translator kept it in because "it's a catchy word that everybody understands". The original English language song was recorded by the Irish pop duo Jedward and included on their second album Victory. It was also included as the bonus track on the Japanese release of their debut album Planet Jedward.

== Release ==
On July 30, 2011, while attending the a-Nation 10th Anniversary for Life Charge & Weider in Jelly concert, U-Know revealed that their upcoming Japanese album was slated for release on September 28. There Max also revealed that their 5th Nationwide Japanese tour would be starting in January of next year.

July 31 it was revealed that previously released tracks "Why? (Keep Your Head Down)", "Maximum", "Superstar", and "I Don't Know" would be included on the album and that three versions: CD+DVD (limited edition version A), CD+DVD (limited edition version B) and CD (Normal Version C) of the album would be released.

On August 15 it was revealed that one of the songs off the album "Back to Tomorrow" would be used as the CM song for Illuneige, a product by Menard Cosmetics. A 1-minute, 12-second preview of the song was available on the Illuneige site.

On August 27 the track list for all three versions of Tone were revealed on Tohoshinki's official Japanese website, along with a 17-second preview of the song "B.U.T (Be-Au-Ty)". The limited edition bonuses were revealed to be a jacket sized card (1 out of 6) and event application (for versions A, B and C), "Superstar" PV shoot off shot movie (for version A), and special miniphotobooklet (for version B).

On September 2, 2011, Tohoshinki revealed the jacket covers for all three versions of Tone, as well as a 30-second teaser for "Duet" on their Japanese site.

From September 2–4 Tohoshinki participated in SMTown Live '10 World Tour, where they performed their yet-to-be released song "B.U.T (Be-Au-Ty)".

September 6, Avex Trax's official YouTube page released a 15-second MV teaser of "B.U.T (Be-Au-Ty)". 5 days later, a 1-minute, 30-second version of "B.U.T (Be-Au-Ty)" was shown, along with three behind-the-scenes footage clips, on Fuji TV's Mezamashi TV. September 19 the full music video for "B.U.T (Be-Au-Ty)" was released through various sites.

On September 27, 2011, the first day of album release, Tone topped the Oricon Daily Album Chart at first place by selling 105,484 copies, surpassing their previous studio album The Secret Code's first day sales of 82,891 copies, the album maintained the daily #1 rank for the remainder of the week. On October 4, 2011, Oricon reported that Tone has sold over 204,980 copies for the week of 9/26~10/2, again surpassing The Secret Code's first week sales of 157,954 copies; it ranked first on the Oricon Weekly Album Chart and earned Tohoshinki their first weekly #1 rank for a studio album release. This is also the first time in over 11 years that a foreign male artist has sold over 200,000 copies in the first week since Bon Jovi's Crush. On November 7, 2011, Oricon reported that Tone has sold over 278,057 copies for the month of October, topping the Oricon Monthly Album Chart at first place, making this the first time Tohoshinki has achieved the monthly #1 rank with a studio album release.

On October 7, 2011, Tone was certified Platinum by the Recording Industry Association of Japan (RIAJ) for shipping over 250,000 copies. On December 19, 2011, Oricon reported that Tone has sold over 293,674 copies in 2011, ranked 20th for the year on the Oricon Yearly Album Chart.

== Track listing ==
Tone version A track list
No.	Title	Lyrics	Music	Arrangement	Length
1.	"Introduction: Magenta"	Shinjiroh Inoue (Lambsey)	Shinjiroh Inoue (Lambsey)	Shinjiroh Inoue (Lambsey)	1:32
2.	"B.U.T (Be-Au-Ty)"	Yoo Young-jin; Kyoko "Luna" Habu	Yoo Young-jin; Ryan S. Jhun (Marcan); Antwann Frost (Marcan)	Marcan	3:35
3.	"I Think U Know"	Kyoko "Luna" Habu	Nermin Harambašić; Robin Jenssen; Ronny Svendsen; Anne Judith Wik	Dsign Music	4:07
4.	"Duet"	Shinjiroh Inoue (Lambsey)	Shinjiroh Inoue (Lambsey)	Shinjiroh Inoue (Lambsey)	4:19
5.	"Thank You My Girl"	Kyoko "Luna" Habu	John Paul Lam; Tony Oh; Akil-Kahil Ali Thompson	John Paul Lam	3:11
6.	"Telephone"	Kyoko "Luna" Habu	Michele Vice-Maslin; C.J. Vanston; Matt Tryggestad	Michele Vice-Maslin; C.J. Vanston	3:25
7.	"Back to Tomorrow"	Shinjiroh Inoue (Lambsey)	White N3rd (Scott Wild); Paul Lewis	White N3rd (Scott Wild)	3:39
8.	"Why? (Keep Your Head Down)" (Japanese version)	Yoo Young-jin; Kyoko "Luna" Habu	Yoo Han-jin; Yoo Young-jin	Yoo Han-jin	4:00
9.	"Maximum" (Japanese version)	Yoo Young-jin; Kyoko "Luna" Habu	Yoo Young-jin	Yoo Young-jin	3:42
10.	"I Don't Know"	Kim Boo-min; Kyoko "Luna" Habu	Hitchhiker	Hitchhiker	3:24
11.	"Superstar"	Kyoko "Luna" Habu	Lars Halvor Jensen; Johannes "Josh" Jørgensen; Drew Ryan Scott; Lindy Robbins	Uta Watanabe	3:43
12.	"Flowers with the Color of Happiness" (シアワセ色の花 (Shiawase Iro no Hana))	Katsuhiko Yamamoto	Katsuhiko Yamamoto	Katsuhiko Yamamoto	6:42
13.	"Easy Mind"	Luna	Coach; Greensleeves	Coach; Greensleeves	3:45
Total length:					49:10

Tone Version B track list
No.	Title	Lyrics	Music	Arrangement	Length
13.	"Weep"	Shinjiroh Inoue (Lambsey)	Solaya	Solaya	4:22
Total length:					49:48

Notes

- Track 13 of Version B is "Weep", this version does not include the song "Easy Mind"

Tone Version C track list
No.	Title	Lyrics	Music	Arrangement	Length
14.	"Weep"	Shinjiroh Inoue (Lambsey)	Solaya	Solaya	4:22
15.	"Somebody to Love" (2011 version)	Yoshimitsu Sawamoto; Matsuo Kiyoshi	Masaya Wada	H-Wonder	4:03
Total length:					57:37

Tone Version A DVD
No.	Title	Length
1.	"Why? (Keep Your Head Down)" (Japanese version)
2.	"Superstar"
3.	"I Don't Know"
4.	"B.U.T (Be-Au-Ty)"
5.	"Superstar" (dance version)
6.	"I Don't Know" (dance version)
7.	"B.U.T (Be-Au-Ty)" (dance version)
8.	"Superstar PV Shoot Off Shot Movie" (limited edition only)

Tone Version B DVD
No.	Title	Length
1.	"Maximum/Why? (Keep Your Head Down)" (August 2, 2011, Event @ Makuhari Messe live)
2.	"Superstar JK Shooting Off Shoot Movie"
3.	"Album JK Shooting Off Shoot Movie"

== Charts ==
=== Weekly charts ===
Chart (2011)	Peak position
Japanese Albums (Oricon)	1
Japanese Top Albums (Billboard)	1
South Korean Albums (Gaon)	4
Taiwanese J-pop Albums (G-Music)	5

=== Year-end charts ===
Chart (2011)	Position
Japanese Albums (Oricon)	20

== Sales and certifications ==
Region	Certification	Certified units/sales
Japan (RIAJ)	Platinum	331,600
South Korea	—	11,765

== Release history ==
Format	Country	Date	Version	Distributing label
CD; CD+DVD (Normal); CD+DVD (Limited)	Japan	September 28, 2011	All versions	Avex Trax
CD; CD+DVD (Normal); CD+DVD (Limited)	South Korea	October 14, 2011	Version A, C	S.M. Entertainment
CD; CD+DVD (Normal); CD+DVD (Limited)	Taiwan	October 14, 2011	All versions	Avex Taiwan
CD; CD+DVD (Normal); CD+DVD (Limited)	Philippines	November 26, 2011	All versions	Universal Records

== See also ==
- TVXQ albums discography
- List of Oricon number-one albums of 2011
