= Keep Your Head Down (song) =

- Cover for Japanese release

Single by TVXQ / Tohoshinki

from the album Keep Your Head Down and Tone
- B-side: "Maximum" (Japan)
- Released: January 3, 2011
- Recorded: 2010
- Studio: SM Booming System, Seoul
- Genre: Industrial hip hop; baroque pop; experimental
- Length: 3:58
- Label: SM; Avex Trax
- Composers: Yoo Young-jin; Yoo Han-jin
- Lyricists: Yoo Young-jin; Luna

TVXQ / Tohoshinki singles chronology
"Athena" (2010)	"Keep Your Head Down" (2011)	"Before U Go" (2011)

Music video
- "Keep Your Head Down" on YouTube

"Keep Your Head Down" (Korean: 왜 Wae; "Why"), released in Japan as "Why? (Keep Your Head Down)", is a song recorded by South Korean boy group TVXQ (or Tohoshinki in Japan). Composed by Yoo Young-jin and Yoo Han-jin, the Korean-language version of "Keep Your Head Down" was released by S.M. Entertainment on January 3, 2011 as the lead single for the group's fifth Korean studio album Keep Your Head Down (2011), TVXQ's first album since becoming a two-piece band with U-Know Yunho and Max Changmin. The Japanese-language version of "Keep Your Head Down", which was released on January 26, 2011, by Avex Trax, served as TVXQ's 31st Japanese single in Japan. It was the first single taken from their fifth Japanese studio album, Tone (2011).

The song was met with mixed reviews upon its debut. With lyrics talking about overcoming a relationship breakup, it was claimed that the song was a diss to JYJ, the three former members of TVXQ. "Keep Your Head Down" peaked at number five on Korea's Gaon Singles Chart and sold over 1.3 million digital units in South Korea by the end of the year. In Japan, "Keep Your Head Down" was TVXQ's ninth single to top Japan's Oricon Singles Chart. It was certified platinum by the Recording Industry Association of Japan (RIAJ), becoming TVXQ's second best-selling single in Japan.

== Background and recording ==
"Keep Your Head Down", also known by its Korean title "Why" (왜), was composed by brothers Yoo Han-jin and Yoo Young-jin, who also wrote the song lyrics. An SMP song, "Keep Your Head Down" has musical influences of industrial hip hop, baroque pop, R&B, and rap. The song was originally written for Yunho, who recorded the song in early August 2010 and performed it at the SM Town Live '10 World Tour concert in Seoul on August 21, 2010. The Seoul concert marked Yunho and Changmin's first comeback appearance together since their split with former TVXQ members Kim Jae-joong, Park Yoo-chun, and Kim Jun-su in early 2010. The positive responses in their two-piece performances prompted Yunho and Changmin to return to the studios to finish the recording of TVXQ's fifth Korean studio album. "Keep Your Head Down" was then chosen as the lead single.

The song debuted on South Korea's digital charts on January 3, 2011, the same day as the premiere of the song's music video. The Japanese version of the song was released as a CD and DVD single on January 26, 2011. With elements of industrial hip hop and baroque pop, "Keep Your Head Down" is labeled as an SMP song, a staple genre in TVXQ's music.

== Critical response ==
"Keep Your Head Down" received mixed responses upon its release, and its lyrics came under media scrutiny. Starting off with the self-empowering English opening lines "Do you know what time it is? This is return of the King", TVXQ sing about their determination to return stronger after breaking up with a former lover. The song ends with the protagonist claiming that his former lover has "[been] erased, disappeared, died" in his heart, and that she no longer ceases to exist.

The song was interpreted as a diss to former members Jaejoong, Yoochun, and Junsu, who were still in a long-standing legal feud with TVXQ's agency S.M. Entertainment at the time of the song's release. Yunho and Changmin clarified that the lyrics of "Keep Your Head Down" were not meant to be directed at the trio, and that the lyrics were written in a style that could be interpreted in different ways.

== Promotion and live performances ==
A sample of the song's original Korean-language version was first performed by Yunho at the SM Town Live '10 World Tour in August 2010, three months before the official announcement of TVXQ's Korean comeback. The full Korean single was released on January 3, 2011, which was accompanied by the premiere of its music video on TVXQ's official video-sharing websites. The Japanese version was used in the Japanese Wii game Just Dance Wii.

== Formats and track listings ==
- Korean digital download
1. "왜 (Keep Your Head Down)" – 3:58
- Japanese digital download
1. "Why? (Keep Your Head Down)" – 4:00
2. "MAXIMUM" – 3:41
- Japanese CD+DVD single AVCK-79022

Disc 1 (CD)

1. "Why? (Keep Your Head Down)"
2. "MAXIMUM"
3. "Why? (Keep Your Head Down)" (-Less Vocal-)
4. "MAXIMUM" (-Less Vocal-)

Disc 2 (DVD)

1. "Why? (Keep Your Head Down)" (Video Clip)
2. "Why? (Keep Your Head Down)" (Off Shot Movie) (First Press Limited Edition only)
- Japanese CD single AVCK-79023
1. "Why? (Keep Your Head Down)"
2. "MAXIMUM"
3. "Why? (Keep Your Head Down)" -Night Rod Man Regeneration Mix-
4. "Why? (Keep Your Head Down)" (-Less Vocal-)
5. "MAXIMUM" (-Less Vocal-)
- Japanese Bigeast CD single AVC1-79024
1. "Why? (Keep Your Head Down)"
2. "MAXIMUM"
3. "Why? (Keep Your Head Down)" (-Less Vocal-)
4. "MAXIMUM" (-Less Vocal-)

== Charts ==
=== Weekly charts ===
Chart (2011)	Peak position
Korean
South Korea Singles Chart (Gaon)	5
Japanese
Japan Singles Chart (Oricon)	1
Digital Track Chart (RIAJ)	1
Japan Hot 100 (Billboard)	1
Japan Adult Contemporary Airplay (Billboard)	20
Japan Hot Top Airplay (Billboard)	16
Taiwan Albums Chart (G-Music)	9

=== Sales ===
Chart (2011)	Peak position	Debut sales	Sales total	Chart run
Korean (Gaon Singles Chart)
Weekly Download Chart	1	—	1,391,468 (digital)	—
Monthly Download Chart	—	—	1,391,468 (digital)	—
Yearly Download Chart	134	—	1,391,468 (digital)	—
Japanese (Oricon Singles Chart)
Daily Singles Chart	1	133,223	285,051	20 weeks
Weekly Singles Chart	1	231,498	285,051	20 weeks
Monthly Singles Chart	1	231,498	285,051	20 weeks
Yearly Singles Chart	16	285,051	285,051	20 weeks

=== Year-end charts ===
Chart (2011)	Peak position
Korean
South Korea Singles Chart (Gaon)	108
Japanese
Japan Singles Chart (Oricon)	16
Japan Hot 100 (Billboard)	30
Japan Digital Track Chart (RIAJ)	31

== Certifications ==
Region	Certification	Certified units/sales
Japan (RIAJ) Physical single	Platinum	250,000^{^}
Japan (RIAJ) Digital single	Platinum	250,000^{*}
^{*} Sales figures based on certification alone.^{^} Shipments figures based on certification alone.

== Credits ==
Credits adapted from album's liner notes.

=== Studio ===
- SM Booming System – recording, mixing
- Sonic Korea – mastering

=== Personnel ===
- SM Entertainment – executive producer
- Lee Soo-man – producer
- Kim Young-min – executive supervisor
- TVXQ – vocals, background vocals
- Luna – Japanese lyrics
- Yoo Young-jin – producer, Korean lyrics, composition, vocal directing, background vocals, recording, mixing
- Yoo Han-jin – composition, arrangement
- Jeon Hoon – mastering
