= Keep Your Head Down =

- Digital and Limited version cover.

Studio album by TVXQ
- Released: January 5, 2011
- Recorded: 2009–10
- Studios: SM Studios (Seoul, South Korea)
- Genres: K-pop; R&B; dance; electronica; experimental
- Length: 35:11
- Language: Korean
- Label: S.M.
- Producers: E-Tribe; Hwang Hyun; JQ; Kenzie; Kim Dal-woo; Kim Tae-sung; Lee Soo-man (exec.); Mr. Cho; Noday; Outsidaz; Park Chang-hyun; Yoo Young-jin

TVXQ chronology
Complete Set Limited Box (2010)	Keep Your Head Down (2011)	Tone (2011)

Singles from Keep Your Head Down
- 1. "Athena" Released: December 10, 2010; 2. "Keep Your Head Down" Released: January 3, 2011

Repackage edition cover
- Before U Go repackage album cover

Singles from Before U Go
- 1. "Before U Go" Released: March 14, 2011

Keep Your Head Down is the fifth Korean studio album (ninth overall) by South Korean pop duo TVXQ, released on January 5, 2011, by S.M. Entertainment. Recording and writing for the album roughly began in the summer of 2009, but full production did not begin until August 2010, after U-Know Yunho and Max Changmin debuted their first performance as a duo at the SM Town Live '10 World Tour concert in Seoul, South Korea.

Bringing in a new line of producers, including E-Tribe and Outsidaz, Keep Your Head Down largely consists of dance-pop songs with urban and electronic arrangements. The album has been described by critics as fierce, dark, and powerful due to its SMP influence, an experimental genre that is defined by mixing the styles of orchestral pop, rock, and contemporary R&B with hip hop beats to create catchy, rhythmic tracks that allow for very strong dance performances. Released in two different versions, the album spawned two promotional singles with one lead single, "Keep Your Head Down". Lyrically, the album explores dark themes of relationships, betrayal and self-empowerment.

In South Korea, the album debuted at number one on the Gaon Albums Chart for the week of January 8, 2011, and maintained its number-one position for a second week. By the end of the month, Gaon reported that 230,227 copies were shipped. By the end of the year, 263,412 copies of the album were sold in South Korea alone, making it the third best-selling album of 2011. Before U Go debuted at number one on South Korea's Gaon Albums Chart and the Hanteo Chart, selling 55,243 copies by July 2011. By the end of the year, Before U Go sold 60,709 copies. Including Keep Your Head Down, the albums collective sold over 324,000 copies in South Korea and 89,000 copies in Japan.

Before U Go, the repackage of Keep Your Head Down, was released on March 16, 2011. The repackage features three new tracks, all of which are remixes of the album's only lead single, "Before U Go." The single is produced by TVXQ's frequent collaborator Yoo Young-jin and his brother Yoo Han-jin, who also produced their fifth album lead single "Keep Your Head Down".

== Background and recording ==
In July 2009, Hero Jaejoong, Micky Yoochun, and Xiah Junsu filed a lawsuit against their agency S.M. Entertainment, claiming that their 13-year contracts were excessively long and their profits were unfairly distributed. In October 2009, the Seoul Central District Court granted the three members a temporary contract injunction, thus halting TVXQ's group activities in South Korea. The trio continued their activities with TVXQ in Japan under their Japanese label Rhythm Zone, but in April 2010, Rhythm Zone's parent label Avex Trax suspended TVXQ in order to sign Jaejoong, Yoochun, and Junsu as the band JYJ. The suspension pushed remaining TVXQ members U-Know Yunho and Max Changmin to an indefinite hiatus, and TVXQ's fifth Korean album was put on hold.

In August 2010, Yunho and Changmin performed as TVXQ in Seoul's SMTown Live '10 World Tour, which was described to be an "experimental" stage for the duo. Earning strong and supportive reactions from the audience, Yunho and Changmin decided to continue TVXQ activities without the other three. There was an attempt to add new members to the group, but their mentor Lee Soo-man suggested that they should continue as a duo act.

The duo began working on their comeback album shortly after the concert in Seoul. "Keep Your Head Down", an SMP song Yunho performed at the concert, was chosen to be the album's lead single. The song was produced by Yoo Young-jin, who also produced the album's third track "Maximum", a dance-pop song that was originally recorded by all five TVXQ members in 2009. Bringing in a new line of producers including E-Tribe and Outsidaz, principal recording for Keep Your Head Down spanned three months.

== Release and promotion ==
In November 2010, S.M. Entertainment announced TVXQ's return with Keep Your Head Down in January 2011. On December 20, 2010, two weeks ahead of the official album release, TVXQ released the digital single "Athena", the theme song for the South Korean television drama Athena: Goddess of War. Two versions of the album were subsequently announced – a special edition with a 100-page photobook; and a normal edition, which includes one bonus track.

A week before the album's official release, two teaser trailers for the music video of lead single "Keep Your Head Down" began airing on television and other broadcast media around South Korea. "Keep Your Head Down" was digitally released on January 3, 2011, and the full album was made available for download on January 5, 2011, the same day as the traditional CD release of the album's special edition. On January 11, S.M. Entertainment released a free TVXQ iPhone app to promote the album. On January 12, 2011, physical copies of the normal edition were distributed to retailers.

In early March 2011, S.M. Entertainment announced the repackage of Keep Your Head Down, titled Before U Go. The repackage was released on March 16, while the Japanese version of the release, which includes the Japanese version of the lead single "Before U Go", was released on May 5. Lead single "Before U Go" was described to be "traditional R&B track", equipped with a unique style that complements the vocal structures of Yunho and Changmin.

TVXQ debuted their first performance of "Before U Go" on KBS 2TV's Music Bank on March 18, 2011. In order to promote the single on MBC's Show! Music Core music program and the MBC radio, TVXQ slightly modified the lyrics of "Before U Go" to pass MBC's strict broadcast standards. The original lyrics "I was a stupid fool who couldn't even take care of you", was changed to "I was stupid and couldn't even take care of you". South Korea's other broadcasting corporations, including KBS and SBS, had no issues with the lyrics and the duo were allowed to perform the original edit on their shows. On March 25, "Before U Go" was the number one song of the week and topped the K-charts, winning a trophy on Music Bank. On March 27, "Before U Go" won on The Music Trend.

== Reception and commercial performance ==
Keep Your Head Down received generally positive reviews from music critics and K-pop fans, who have praised the album's "powerful" production and its cohesive blend of pop and R&B. The lyrics of "Keep Your Head Down", which talks about recovering from a relationship breakup, came under intense media scrutiny after it was claimed that it was written as a diss track to JYJ. Several TVXQ and JYJ fansites also withdrew their support for the song. Yunho and Changmin clarified that the lyrics were misinterpreted, stating, "It's just a song about a man's anger towards the woman that threw him away. That's all."

The album has been commercially successful across Asia. In South Korea, it immediately shot to number one on the real-time daily charts of Hanteo, selling nearly 30,000 physical copies on its first day of release. Keep Your Head Down debuted at number one on the weekly Gaon Albums Chart and maintained its number one position for a second week. By the end of the month, Gaon reported over 230,000 shipments. Keep Your Head Down was the year's third best-selling album, with 263,412 copies sold in South Korea. The album also debuted at number four on both Taiwan's G-Music and Japan's Oricon.

Before U Go debuted at number one on South Korea's Gaon Albums Chart and the Hanteo Chart, boosting the sales for the original album, Keep Your Head Down. The lead single, "Before U Go", peaked at number thirteen on the Gaon Singles Chart and number one on various online music charts, receiving generally positive reviews from music critics. The single also won number-one trophies on music programs The Music Trend and Music Bank.

In August 2011, the Ministry of Gender Equality and Family banned "Before U Go" and three other K-pop music videos, ruling that it was harmful media to youth as it promoted violence and gambling. S.M. Entertainment submitted a petition to refute their decision.

== Singles ==
"Athena" was digitally released on December 20, 2010, and debuted at number 50 on the weekly Gaon Singles Chart. The music video for the album's lead single "Keep Your Head Down", officially premiered on January 3, 2011. The single debuted at number 5 on the weekly Gaon Singles Chart. "Journey", the theme song for Changmin's television drama Paradise Ranch, was released on January 26, 2011, and only managed to peak at number 111 on the Gaon Singles Chart.

Despite the track's leak on March 12, the scheduled digital download release of "Before U Go" on March 14 topped various online download and streaming charts in the first few hours.

The music videos for "Before U Go" was released in three parts. The teaser trailer for the music videos was first unveiled on March 10, 2011. A short film with a running time of little over 15 minutes, the music video has actor Choi Jong-yoon and actress Ara star alongside Yunho and Changmin as morally conflicted police officers. On March 14, the main video, directed by Jo Soo-hyun, was released. The full short film was released on March 20, and the last video, a dance version directed by Hong Won-ki, was released on March 29. The entire short film took five days to shoot at locations in Gangnam, Incheon, and Ilsan.

== Track listing ==
Keep Your Head Down track list
No.	Title	Lyrics	Music	Arrangement	Length
1.	"Keep Your Head Down" (왜; Wae; lit. 'Why')	Yoo Young-jin	Yoo Young-jin; Yoo Han-jin	Yoo Han-jin	3:59
2.	"How Can I" (믿기 싫은 이야기; Mitgi Silheun Iyaki; lit. 'The Story I Don't Want to Believe')	Park Chang-hyun	Park Chang-hyun	Park Chang-hyun	3:22
3.	"Maximum"	Yoo Young-jin	Yoo Young-jin	Yoo Young-jin	3:40
4.	"Crazy" (featuring Jay from Trax)	Tesung Kim (Iconic Sounds)	Tesung Kim (Iconic Sounds); NODAY	Tesung Kim (Iconic Sounds); NODAY	3:18
5.	"Honey Funny Bunny" (U-Know Yunho solo)	E-Tribe	E-Tribe; Jang Jun-ho (Duble Kick Entertainment)	E-Tribe; Jang Yun-ho (Duble Kick Entertainment); Gong Hyun-sik (Duble Kick Entertainment)	3:19
6.	"Rumor (colinosion's song)"	Hong Ji-yoo	Ryan Kim; Casper (Iconic Sounds); Anthony Lee	Ryan Kim; Casper (Iconic Sounds); Anthony Lee	3:17
7.	"Confession" (고백; Gobaek) (Max Changmin solo)	Max Changmin	Kevin Oppa (mr.cho); Tesung Kim (Iconic Sounds)	Kevin Oppa (mr.cho); Tesung Kim (Iconic Sounds)	3:56
8.	"Our Game"	JQ (makeumine works)	Will Simms; Tim Hawes (Zebra1); Obi Mhondera (Zebra1); Stuart Priddle	Will Simms; Zebra1; Stuart Priddle	3:30
9.	"She"	Kenzie	Ryan S. Jhun; Matthew Tishler; Amy Powers; Liz Rodrigues	Kenzie; Ryan S. Jhun	3:15
10.	"Athena" (아테나; Atena)	Hwang Hyun (MonoTree)	Hwang Hyun (MonoTree)	MonoTree	3:35
11.	"Journey" (featuring Seohyun of Girls' Generation)	Kim Dal-woo Peter	Kim Dal-woo Peter	Kim Dal-woo Peter	4:26
Total length:					39:37

Before U Go repackage track list
No.	Title	Lyrics	Music	Arrangement	Length
1.	"Before U Go - Monologue" (이것만은 알고가 - 독백; Igeonman-eun Algoga - Dokbaek)	Yoo Young-jin	Yoo Young-jin; Yoo Han-jin	Yoo Han-jin	2:22
2.	"Before U Go" (이것만은 알고 가; Igeonman-eun Algoga)	Yoo Young-jin	Yoo Young-jin; Yoo Han-jin	Yoo Han-jin	4:31
3.	"Keep Your Head Down" (왜; Wae; lit. 'Why')	Yoo Young-jin	Yoo Young-jin; Yoo Han-jin	Yoo Han-jin	3:59
4.	"Maximum"	Yoo Young-jin	Yoo Young-jin	Yoo Young-jin	3:40
5.	"How Can I" (믿기 싫은 이야기; Mitgi Silheun Iyaki; lit. 'The Story I Don't Want to Believe')	Park Chang-hyun	Park Chang-hyun	Park Chang-hyun	3:22
6.	"Crazy" (featuring Jay from Trax)	Tesung Kim (Iconic Sounds)	Tesung Kim (Iconic Sounds); NODAY	Tesung Kim (Iconic Sounds); NODAY	3:18
7.	"Honey Funny Bunny" (U-Know Yunho solo)	E-Tribe	E-Tribe; Jang Jun-ho (Duble Kick Entertainment)	E-Tribe; Jang Yun-ho (Duble Kick Entertainment); Gong Hyun-sik (Duble Kick Entertainment)	3:19
8.	"Rumor"	Hong Ji-yoo	Ryan Kim; Casper (Iconic Sounds); Anthony Lee	Ryan Kim; Casper (Iconic Sounds); Anthony Lee	3:17
9.	"Confession" (고백; Gobaek) (Max Changmin solo)	Max Changmin	Kevin Oppa (mr.cho); Tesung Kim (Iconic Sounds)	Kevin Oppa (mr.cho); Tesung Kim (Iconic Sounds)	3:56
10.	"Our Game"	JQ (makeumine works)	Will Simms; Tim Hawes (Zebra1); Obi Mhondera (Zebra1); Stuart Priddle	Will Simms; Zebra1; Stuart Priddle	3:30
11.	"She"	Kenzie	Ryan S. Jhun; Matthew Tishler; Amy Powers; Liz Rodrigues	Kenzie; Ryan S. Jhun	3:15
12.	"Athena" (아테나; Atena)	Hwang Hyun (MonoTree)	Hwang Hyun (MonoTree)	MonoTree	3:35
13.	"Journey" (featuring Seohyun of Girls' Generation)	Kim Dal-woo Peter	Kim Dal-woo Peter	Kim Dal-woo Peter	4:26
14.	"Before U Go - Monologue" (Instrumental)		Yoo Young-jin; Yoo Han-jin	Yoo Han-jin	2:23
Total length:					48:48

== Charts ==
=== Weekly charts ===
Weekly chart performance for Keep Your Head Down & Before U Go
Chart (2011)	Position	
Chart (2011)	KYHD	BUG
South Korean Albums (Gaon)	1	1
Taiwanese Albums (G-Music)	4	14
Taiwanese East Asian Albums (G-Music)	4	1

=== Year-end charts ===
Year-end chart positions for Keep Your Head Down & Before U Go
Chart (2011)	Position	
Chart (2011)	KYHD	BUG
South Korean Albums (Gaon)	3	20

== Release history ==
Release formats for Keep Your Head Down
Region	Date	Format	Version	Label
Worldwide / South Korea	January 5, 2011	CD; digital download	Special edition	S.M. Entertainment
Worldwide / South Korea	January 12, 2011	CD; digital download	Normal edition	S.M. Entertainment
Taiwan	February 11, 2011	CD	Normal edition	Avex Taiwan
Taiwan	February 24, 2012	CD+DVD	Taiwan special edition	Avex Taiwan
Hong Kong	February 22, 2011	CD	Normal edition	Avex Asia
Philippines	April 29, 2011	CD	Normal edition	Universal Records

Release formats for Before U Go
Regions	Dates	Format(s)	Label(s)
Worldwide	March 16, 2011	CD; digital download	S.M. Entertainment
South Korea	March 16, 2011	CD; digital download	S.M. Entertainment
Taiwan	March 25, 2011	CD	Avex Taiwan
Japan	May 4, 2011	CD; DVD; digital download	Avex Trax

== See also ==
- TVXQ albums discography
- List of number-one albums of 2011 (South Korea)
