= TVXQ =

South Korean boy band

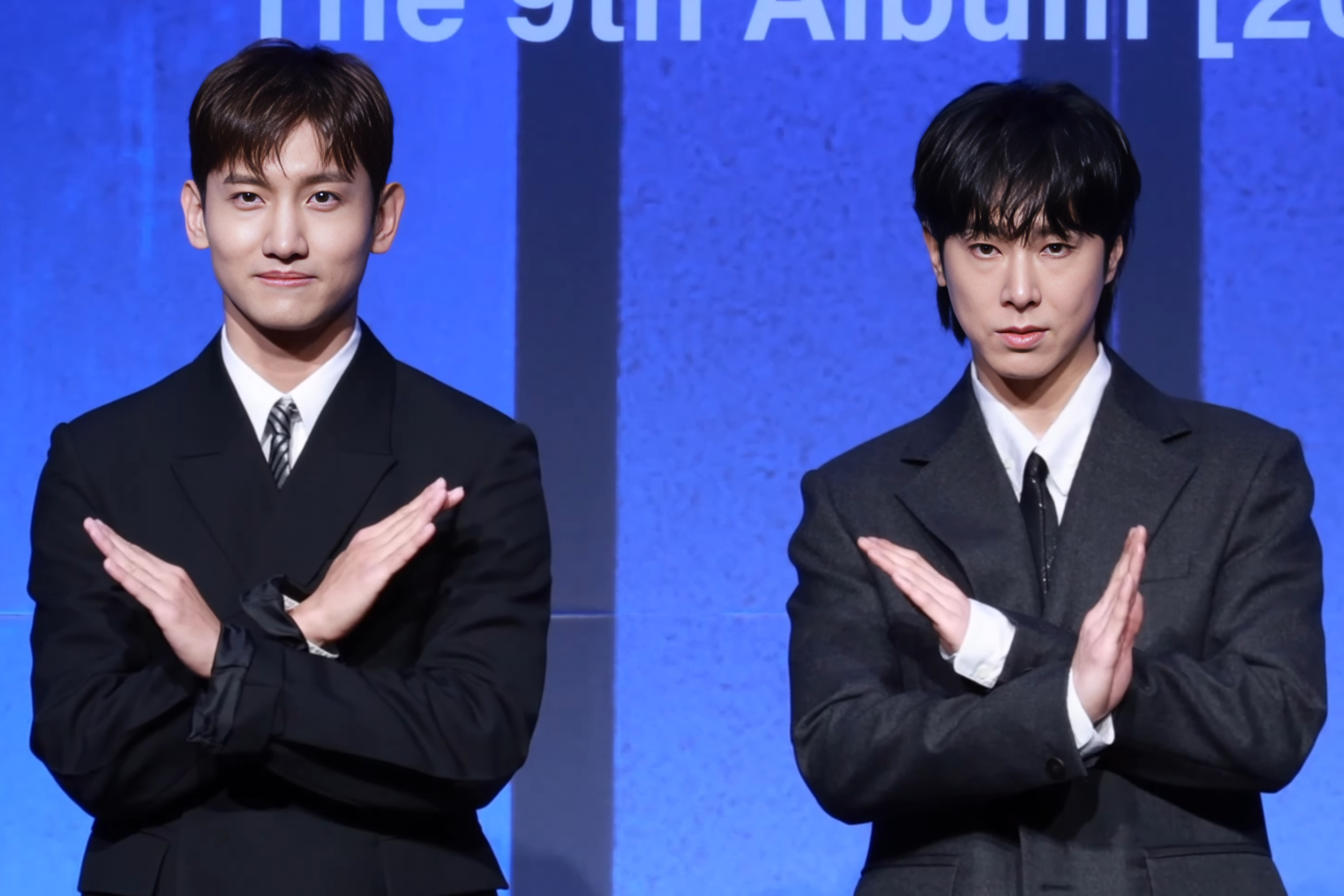
- Max Changmin and U-Know Yunho in December 2023

Background information
- Also known as: Tohoshinki; DBSK; TVfXQ
- Origin: Seoul, South Korea
- Genres: K-pop; pop; dance; R&B; electronic; rock
- Years active: 2003–present
- Labels: SM; Avex Trax; Rhythm Zone
- Member of: SM Town
- Members: U-Know Yunho; Max Changmin
- Past members: Hero Jaejoong; Micky Yoochun; Xiah Junsu
- Website: smentertainment toho-jp.net

Korean name
- Hangul: 동방신기
- Hanja: 東方神起
- RR: Dongbangsingi
- MR: Tongbangsin'gi

Chinese name
- Traditional Chinese: 東方神起
- Simplified Chinese: 东方神起
Transcriptions
Standard Mandarin
- Hanyu Pinyin: Dōngfāngshénqǐ
- Wade–Giles: Tung¹-fang¹-shên²-chʻi³

Japanese name
- Kanji: 東方神起
- Hiragana: とうほうしんき
Transcriptions
- Revised Hepburn: Tōhōshinki
- Kunrei-shiki: Tôhôsinki

TVXQ (stylized as TVXQ!; Korean: 동방신기; lit. 'Rising Gods of the East'), also known as Tohoshinki (東方神起) in Japan, is a South Korean duo formed by SM Entertainment, composed of U-Know Yunho and Max Changmin. On January 25 and 26, 2011, Yunho and Changmin began their activities as the duo TVXQ, starting with "SMTOWN LIVE"—a joint concert organized by SM Entertainment that marked the event's debut in Japan.

Originally formed in 2003 as a five-member boy band which also consisted of members Hero Jaejoong, Micky Yoochun, and Xiah Junsu, TVXQ debuted with their first single "Hug" (2004). Their first four albums as a quintet, Tri-Angle (2004), Rising Sun (2005), "O"-Jung.Ban.Hap. (2006), and Mirotic (2008), received chart-topping commercial success in South Korea, with the latter winning the Golden Disk Award for Album of the Year. Mirotic's title track was recognized by international music critics as a staple in K-pop. They were one of the first Korean artists to lead the Korean Wave in Japan, where they were propelled to mainstream stardom following the release of their fourth Japanese album The Secret Code (2009).

However, despite their commercial success, the band was plunged into legal turmoil and internal conflict when members Jaejoong, Yoochun, and Junsu attempted to split from their Korean agency SM Entertainment. They released their last Japanese album as a quintet, Best Selection 2010 prior to the trio's departure in 2010. It became the band's first album to top the Oricon Albums Chart. Two previously released songs on the album, One Piece theme song, "Share the World" (2009), were platinum-selling.

After a year-long hiatus, TVXQ returned as a duo with their fifth Korean album Keep Your Head Down (2011), topping album charts in most major Asian markets upon release. Their first two Japanese albums as a duo, Tone (2011) and Time (2013), solidified their success in Japan as it forged TVXQ's reputation as one of the top-touring artists in the country. Their tenth Japanese album XV (2019) made TVXQ the first foreign music act in Japan to have six number-one albums in a row.

Having sold over 10 million physical records in the first 10 years of their career, TVXQ are one of Asia's most successful music acts of their generation. They are sometimes referred to as "Asia's Stars" and the "Kings of K-pop" for their immense success and contributions to the Korean Wave. According to Oricon, TVXQ have the most number-one singles and albums for a foreign artist in Japan, and are Japan's best-selling foreign artist of all time. Their Time Tour, one of the highest-grossing concert tours of 2013, broke attendance records for foreign singers in Japan until 2017, when TVXQ broke their own record with their Begin Again Tour. TVXQ are the first non-Japanese Asian artists to headline a nationwide five-Dome tour and the first foreign artists to headline the Nissan Stadium. Billboard has described the band as "K-pop royalty." TVXQ held a successful 3-day performance at Tokyo Dome on April 27, 2025 to commemorate their 20th anniversary.

== History ==
=== 2003: Formation ===
With the disbandment of H.O.T. in 2001 and Shinhwa's departure in 2003, producer Lee Soo-man of SM Entertainment went on a search for another boy band to stay competitive in the growing K-pop market. In early 2003, Lee eventually selected five teenage boys from four different SM training teams to debut in a vocal dance unit. Xiah Junsu, the first to join the new group, became an SM trainee at age eleven and was originally trained to be a solo singer. He was put into an R&B trio with trainees Sungmin and Eunhyuk (both now of Super Junior fame), and the trio made their first appearance on the reality show Survival Audition – Heejun vs. Kangta, Battle of the Century, a 2002 series that starred former H.O.T. members Kangta and Moon Hee-jun as mentors for prospective singers.

U-Know Yunho, who signed with SM Entertainment in 2000, was a member of several failed project groups throughout his years as a trainee. In 2001, he was featured as a rapper in Dana's debut single "Diamond" and briefly toured with her. That same year, Hero Jaejoong auditioned for SM Entertainment and was subsequently accepted into the agency after going through various auditions. Following trainees Heechul and Kangin, Yunho and Jaejoong joined the project group Four Seasons in 2002, but the quartet disbanded when Yunho and Jaejoong were selected to join Lee's new group in 2003. Heechul and Kangin went on to debut as members of Super Junior two years later.

Max Changmin, the youngest at age fifteen, was the fourth to join the new band. Micky Yoochun, who started his training only a few months before the band's official debut in December 2003, was the last member to make the cut. The boys received phone calls from Lee and were told to attend a photo shoot session, which turned out to be a briefing for their upcoming debut. To build group chemistry, the members moved into a small dormitory room arranged by their management. After a few weeks of training and rehearsals, they recorded their first song "Thanks To" and performed it at the SM New Face Showcase. Yunho was appointed as the band's leader.

During their early recording sessions, the band was offered some tentative names to use: SM5, Dream Team, O Jang Yuk Bu (Korean: 오장육부; Hanja: 五臟六腑; literally "The Five Visceras and the Six Entrails"), Jeon Meok Go (short for Jeonseoleul Meokgo Saneun Gorae; 전설을 먹고 사는 고래; literally "A Whale That Eats Legends"), and Dong Bang Bul Pae (동방불패; 東方不敗), the Korean name for the Chinese wuxia character, Invincible East. They decided on Dong Bang Bul Pae, and even obtained permission to use the name from Film Workshop, but the name was later rejected by their management because the Hanja was not aesthetically pleasing. Their name was subsequently finalized to Dong Bang Shin Ki (동방신기; 東方神起), which was suggested by Lee's acquaintance.

TVXQ made their first public appearance and debut on December 26, 2003, in a BoA and Britney Spears showcase, where they performed their debut single "Hug" and an a cappella rendition of "O Holy Night" with BoA.

=== 2004–2005: Debut and early years ===
The group released the physical single of "Hug" on January 14, 2004. The single debuted at number thirty seven on the monthly MIAK chart (Note: Prior to the establishment of the Circle Chart (previously known as the Gaon Chart), South Korea's music charts were supplied by the Music Industry of Korea (MIAK), which only published monthly and yearly rankings. Thus, all rankings for Korean records in this article up to 2010 refer to the monthly charts, and all rankings for Japanese records refer to the Oricon's weekly charts, unless otherwise stated.) selling less than 5,000 copies. On February 6, 2004, TVXQ made their official television debut at the Mnet and KM cable music program Music Tank, where they performed "Hug" and "O Holy Night". The following day, they performed on SBS's Inkigayo.

The sales of "Hug" picked up following their television appearances, and on March 28, 2004, TVXQ won their first music show award with "Hug" on Inkigayo. "Hug" won two more music show awards in April 2004. By May 2004, "Hug" sold 118,114 copies and reached a peak at number four on the MIAK for April 2004, and stayed charted for ten consecutive months. On June 24, 2004, TVXQ released their second single "The Way U Are", which entered the MIAK at number two for June 2004. In July 2004, TVXQ participated in their first SM Town project and collaborated with other label mates to release the SM Town album, 2004 Summer Vacation in SMTown.com. In October 2004, TVXQ released their first full-length studio album Tri-Angle. It was TVXQ's first record to debut at number one on the MIAK, selling a total of 242,580 copies in the month of October. According to the MIAK, "The Way U Are" and Tri-Angle were two of the top ten best-selling physical albums of 2004.

During the promotions of Tri-Angle, SM Entertainment had plans to promote TVXQ in mainland China and Taiwan under the support of its overseas partner, Avex Group under the name 東方神起 or TongVfangXienQi. TVXQ members recorded Mandarin versions of their popular singles and released them exclusively on the Taiwan press of Tri-Angle.

Inspired by the success of BoA's Japanese music career, TVXQ signed with Japan's Avex Group in late 2004. In November 2004, they released an English version of "Hug" in Japan, but the single failed to gain momentum despite TVXQ's success in South Korea, Taiwan, and China. Re-introduced as Tohoshinki (東方神起) for the Japanese market, the members learned Japanese and move to Japan for their first official single. They released their debut Japanese single "Stay with Me Tonight" in April 2005 through Avex's record label Rhythm Zone. The single reached to number thirty-seven on the weekly Oricon Singles Chart. Before returning to Korea to prepare for their second Korean album, TVXQ released their second Japanese single "Somebody to Love" in July 2005, which peaked at number fourteen on the Oricon. TVXQ's debut in Japan was not as successful as their management had hoped, and the group said their first few months in Japan were difficult. To promote their singles, TVXQ performed for Avex's annual A-Nation summer concert tour in August 2005, their first musical festival in Japan.

Their second Korean album Rising Sun was released in South Korea on September 12, 2005, and became the group's first breakthrough album. It debuted at number one on the Korean charts and was the fourth best-selling record of 2005. The album's lead single "Rising Sun" was a popular hit, and it eventually became the group's signature piece. TVXQ ended the year with two more releases: their third Japanese single "My Destiny" and a Korean maxi single "Show Me Your Love", featuring Super Junior. The latter single entered the Korean charts at number one for December 2005. Rising Sun garnered several popularity awards for the group at the end of the year, including M.net KM Music Video Festival's Best Popular Music Video award, the ceremony's daesang ("grand prize").

=== 2006–2007: Japanese albums and "O"-Jung.Ban.Hap. ===
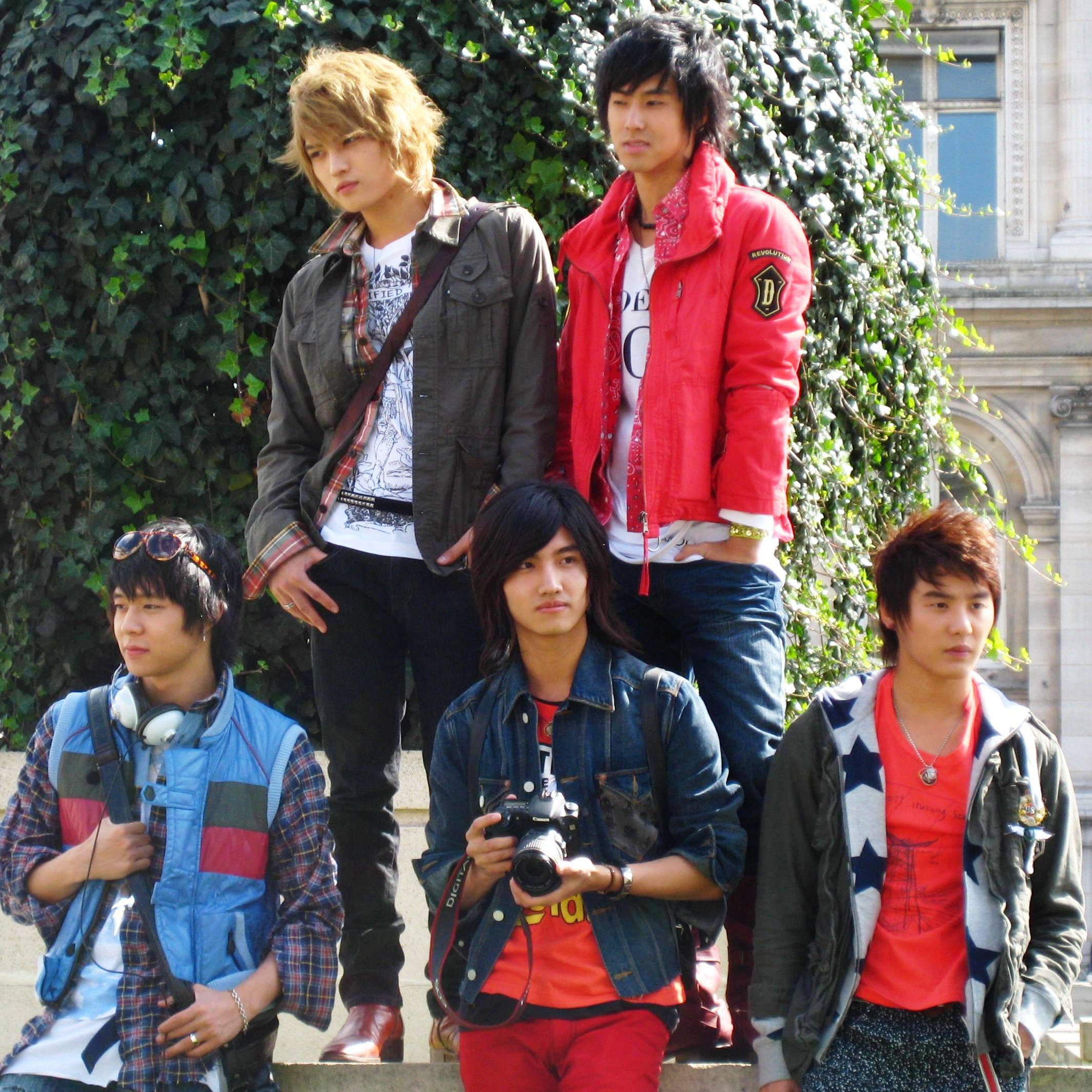
TVXQ in Paris, 2007

In February 2006, TVXQ embarked on their first headlining international concert tour, the Rising Sun Tour. Comprising six shows only, the tour started off with four shows in Seoul, South Korea. On July 14, 2006, the tour stopped by Kuala Lumpur, Malaysia, where TVXQ were the first Korean artist to hold a concert in the country. The tour's second and last overseas stop was in Bangkok, Thailand on July 15, 2006. A CD recording of their concert in Korea was released on July 14; the DVD was released six months later in January 2007, and had initial sales of 38,000 units.

On March 8, 2006, TVXQ released their fourth Japanese single, "Asu wa Kuru Kara" (明日は来るから), which became the seventeenth ending theme for the long-running anime series One Piece. Their debut Japanese album Heart, Mind and Soul was released two weeks later, and it debuted on the Oricon Albums Chart at number twenty-five, selling 18,000 copies. In April 2006, TVXQ released their first double A-side single "Rising Sun / Heart, Mind and Soul" as a follow-up from their album. The single peaked at number twenty-two. To support Heart, Mind and Soul and its subsequent releases, TVXQ held their first Japanese tour, the 1st Live Tour 2006: Heart, Mind and Soul, from May to June 2006. The tour consisted of eleven shows that attracted an audience of 14,800. After the tour, TVXQ released two more Japanese singles, "Begin" and "Sky". The latter debuted at number six on the Oricon, making it the group's first single to reach the top ten in Japan.

The group resumed their Korean activities with the release of their third Korean album, "O"-Jung.Ban.Hap. on September 29, 2006. The album entered the Korean charts at number one and became the best-selling record of 2006 after one month of release. The success of the album gave TVXQ four coveted grand prize awards in 2006: at the M.net KM Music Festival, they received four awards, including Artist of the Year and Best Group. TVXQ won all three of their nominations at the 16th Seoul Music Awards, and at the 21st Golden Disk Awards, "O"-Jung.Ban.Hap won Album of the Year, the ceremony's grand prize. TVXQ also took home the biggest awards at the SBS Gayo Daejeon. The album's international success won the group their first award in Japan, the Bess Buzz Asia in Korea award at the MTV Video Music Awards Japan.

In November 2006, TVXQ returned to Japan to release their eighth Japanese single, "Miss You / 'O'-Sei-Han-Gō" (miss you / 'O'‐正・反・合), which became TVXQ's first top three single on the Orico'. In January 2007, TVXQ announced their second international tour, O: The 2nd Asia Tour, and toured Seoul, Taipei, Bangkok, Kuala Lumpur, Shanghai and Beijing. The tour attracted an audience of 184,000. TVXQ released their second Japanese album Five in the Black in March 2007, debuting at number ten on the Oricon with nearly 27,000 copies sold on its first week. Drawing in an audience of 46,600, the group toured Japan from May to June 2007. The five singles TVXQ released upon completion of the tour, including "Lovin' You", "Summer", "Shine / Ride On", "Forever Love" and "Together", peaked in the Oricon top five, their most successful being "Summer", which peaked at number two. TVXQ were also featured in Kumi Koda's thirty-eighth single "Last Angel", which was used as the theme song for the Japanese release of Resident Evil: Extinction. Released in November 2007, the single peaked at number three on the Oricon and won Best Collaboration Video at Japan's MTV Video Music Awards.

=== 2008–2009: Japanese breakthrough and international success with Mirotic ===
TVXQ's sixteenth Japanese single "Purple Line", released on January 15, 2008, became the group's first single to debut at number one on the Oricon. Their third Japanese album T was released a week later and debuted at number four, selling over 52,000 copies. With the critical and commercial success of T, TVXQ delayed their Korean comeback to put more focus on their new Japanese releases, and from February to March 2008, the group released a series of five singles consecutively for six weeks, promoting the releases as the "Trick" project. Each single contained a solo track by a member, as well as some of their own compositions. With their new records the group toured around Japan from March to May 2008. The T tour concluded with 17 shows and attracted an audience of 150,000 people, more than three times the size of their previous Five in the Black tour. The tour's DVD, released in August 2008, sold 112,000 copies. T also received a gold certification by the Recording Industry Association of Japan (RIAJ) in May 2008.

Shortly before completing the T tour, TVXQ released their twenty-second Japanese single, "Beautiful You / Sennen Koi Uta". The latter track, "Sennen Koi Uta", was used as the opening theme for the historical Korean drama The Legend when it aired in Japan. Despite the drama's disappointing ratings, the single was a number-one seller, making TVXQ the first non-Japanese Asian performer to release two number-one singles in Japan, a record which was last held by Taiwanese artist Ouyang Fei Fei twenty-four years prior. In July 2008, TVXQ released their twenty-third single, "Dōshite Kimi o Suki ni Natte Shimattandarō?", their third number-one single in Japan. They performed the single at Avex's 20th anniversary meeting and at A-Nation 2008, their fourth consecutive concert with Avex.

In August 2008, TVXQ returned to Korea to prepare for the release of their fourth Korean album, Mirotic. The group assumed more creative control in this album compared to their last Korean releases: Yunho wrote the rap for several tracks, Junsu and Changmin wrote the lyrics to two tracks and Jaejoong and Yoochun recorded their own solo tracks. Mirotic was slated to be released on September 24, 2008, but due to an unprecedented amount of pre-orders, the release was postponed to September 26. The album entered the charts at number one and sold over 110,000 copies in one week, setting a new record. The album's lead single "Mirotic" became TVXQ's most successful single of their career. The song won a total of nine number-one trophies on Korean music programs Inkigayo, Music Bank, and M Countdown, and was touted by international critics as a staple song of K-pop. Mirotic has sold over 600,000 copies, the first Korean album in six years to surpass half a million sales in South Korea.

In October 2008, TVXQ released the Japanese version of "Mirotic", which topped the Oricon, breaking a record that the group had set with their previous single. TVXQ were the first Korean group to attend the Japanese New Year Eve's music festival Kōhaku Uta Gassen, and their invitation to the event was considered one of the biggest highlights of their Japanese music career. In January 2009, the group released their twenty-fifth Japanese single "Bolero / Kiss the Baby Sky / Wasurenaide", which was another number one single for the group. "Bolero" was used as the theme song for the Japanese film Dance Subaru, and TVXQ also made brief cameo appearances in the film. In February 2009, the group kicked off their third international tour, the 3rd Asia Tour: Mirotic, which went through five cities in Asia.

TVXQ released their fourth Japanese album The Secret Code in March 2009 and it debuted at number two on the Oricon. It managed to sell over 317,000 copies in Japan, earning a platinum certification. From May to July 2009, TVXQ went on their fourth headlining Japanese tour, the 4th Live Tour 2009: The Secret Code, which consisted of 21 shows to an audience of 279,500 people. The last two shows of the tour were at the Tokyo Dome, making TVXQ the first Korean group to perform at the venue. The concert's DVD, which was released in September 2009, pre-sold 107,000 copies and ultimately sold more than 353,000 copies. A number-one seller, TVXQ were the first foreign artist in twenty years to peak at first place on the Oricon's DVD rankings.

=== 2009–2010: SM Lawsuit, Best Selection 2010 and the split ===
In July 2009, members Jaejoong, Yoochun, and Junsu attempted to split with their Korean management SM Entertainment, claiming that their thirteen-year contract was excessively long, schedules were held out without permission of the members, and profits were unfairly distributed. In October 2009, the Seoul Central District Court granted the trio a temporary contract injunction, and TVXQ's group activities in Korea were ceased. In November 2009, Yunho and Changmin released a joint statement in support of SM Entertainment, and urged the trio to resolve their issues with their management quickly if they wished to continue their careers as TVXQ members. As a result of the legal battle, the Shenzhen show for the group's Mirotic tour was canceled a week before its scheduled date on November 21, 2009, thus prematurely ending the tour. Despite the injunction, Jaejoong, Yoochun, and Junsu maintained their activities as TVXQ members under Avex's management in Japan, and the group continued to release new Japanese singles together until early 2010. However, the members' last public performance together was on December 31, 2009, at the 60th NHK Kōhaku Uta Gassen, where they performed their twenty-eighth single, "Stand by U".

In January 2010, TVXQ released their twenty-ninth single, "Break Out!", which created a new record for the group. The single topped the Oricon and broke Elton John's fourteen-year record of having the highest first-week sales for a foreign artist. On February 17, 2010, TVXQ released their Japanese greatest hits album Best Selection 2010, a compilation of their number-one hits including new singles released after 2009's The Secret Code, such as "Share the World / We Are!", "Stand by U", and "Break Out!". The album sold over 400,000 copies in one week, earning RIAJ's double platinum status by the end of February. In March 2010, the group released their last single together, "Toki o Tomete", which was certified platinum by the RIAJ.

On April 3, 2010, Avex declared the suspension of TVXQ's Japanese activities, stating that each member would be pursuing a solo career. However, a week later, Avex announced the formation of a "special unit" with members Jaejoong, Yoochun, and Junsu—later known as JYJ—a move that led to Yunho and Changmin's indefinite hiatus from music activities. After JYJ's announcement, SM Entertainment filed a lawsuit against JYJ to validate their contracts. In June 2010, JYJ submitted a lawsuit against SM Entertainment to void their exclusive contracts. Following the suits, SM Entertainment attempted to denounce JYJ and their new agency C-JeS, while Yunho and Changmin remained silent throughout the legal proceedings. In the meantime, Avex released two of TVXQ's greatest hits albums, the Complete Single A-side Collection and the Single B-side Collection, both of which were released on June 30. They were TVXQ's closing releases under their contract with Rhythm Zone.

After several months of inactivity, Yunho and Changmin made their comeback appearances in August 2010 for the Seoul stop of the SM Town Live '10 World Tour, where they performed re-recorded versions of older TVXQ songs. Their two-piece performances garnered strong and supportive reactions from the audience, prompting Yunho and Changmin's decision to continue TVXQ activities without the other three. There were brief talks about recruiting new members, but SM's CEO Lee Soo-man suggested that they should continue as a duo act. Shortly after the concert, the duo began working on their comeback album and brought in a new line of producers, including E-Tribe and Outsidaz. In September 2010, Avex dropped JYJ, citing conflict with C-JeS. Avex then declared its support for remaining TVXQ members Yunho and Changmin on November 24, announcing that the duo have signed a new record contract with Rhythm Zone's sister label Avex Trax.

=== 2011: Return as a duo, Keep Your Head Down and Tone ===
Yunho and Changmin released TVXQ's comeback Korean album Keep Your Head Down on January 5, 2011. The album debuted at number one on the Gaon Albums Chart, and maintained its position for a second week. With 230,922 copies sold by mid-2011, Keep Your Head Down won the Album of the Year for the first quarter of 2011 at the Gaon Chart K-Pop Awards. The album's title single, "Keep Your Head Down" also stayed strong on the charts, winning seven number-one trophies on music shows The Music Trend, Music Bank, and M! Countdown. The Japanese version "Keep Your Head Down", which was released as a physical single in Japan on January 26, 2011, was a chart-topper and became TVXQ's second best-selling single in Japan, earning a platinum certification by the RIAJ. In March 2011, Keep Your Head Down was reissued with a new single, "Before U Go", and the repackaged album Before U Go peaked at number nine on the Gaon, pushing the album to be the third best-selling record of 2011 in South Korea.

While promoting Keep Your Head Down, Yunho and Changmin spoke up for the first time about their 2010 hiatus and breakup with JYJ. According to Yunho, JYJ had "exceedingly deep conflicts" with their agency and the members had irreconcilable differences about their career. Changmin added that the team had worked so hard to the point where they felt like they could finally "harvest the fruits of [their] labor", yet instead of being happy they had to perform their final stage with heavy hearts. JYJ responded by saying that they did not regret their decision in leaving SM Entertainment. The lyrics of "Keep Your Head Down" also came under media scrutiny, with claims that they were directed at JYJ. TVXQ responded by saying that similar claims would still happen even if they were to release a different song with different lyrics. Yunho said, "The song is about a man's mind towards a woman who had left him. We can sometimes find out that a certain song seems to talk about my own story. In this way it totally depends on the interpretation using our own thoughts."

In July 2011, TVXQ released their thirty-second Japanese single "Superstar", which was certified gold by month's end. From July to August, the duo toured around Japan for Avex's A-Nation summer concert, and at the Tokyo stop, TVXQ performed as the closing act, breaking Ayumi Hamasaki's record of closing the concert eight years in a row. TVXQ were the first foreign performers to close the festival. On September 28, the group released the Japanese album Tone, which earned them their first number-one studio album. It sold over 200,000 copies on its first week and earned RIAJ's platinum certification on its second week. TVXQ was the second overseas artist in Japan to achieve album sales of more than 200,000 in a week; the previous holder was Bon Jovi with their 2000 album, Crush.

In the latter months of 2011, the duo performed for a string of K-pop music festivals around the world. They first performed at the 2011 Hallyu Dream Concert at Gyeongju Citizens' Stadium in South Korea on October 3. On October 9, TVXQ participated in the New York-Korea Festival, a concert produced by KBS Global to commemorate the 20th anniversary of Korea's entry into the United Nations. It was held in New Jersey. On October 23, TVXQ performed with SM Town at the SM Town Concert in New York at Madison Square Garden concert and garnered international media attention. TVXQ also participated in the 2011 K-pop Music Fest in Sydney, Australia, presented by JK Entertainment on November 12.

Their new Japanese holiday single "Winter" was released on November 30. The single's A-track, "Winter Rose", was selected as the commercial song for Seven & i Holdings's Winter Gift, which premiered on November 8. TVXQ also contributed in their Korean management's December compilation album 2011 Winter SMTown – The Warmest Gift, and released the song "Sleigh Ride". On December 31, TVXQ performed "Keep Your Head Down" at the 62nd NHK Kohaku Uta Gassen. It was their first time performing at the Kohaku since the split, drawing media attention.

=== 2012–2013: Groundbreaking success in Japan, Catch Me, Time and touring ===
TVXQ started 2012 with their comeback Japanese solo tour, the Tone tour, in January 2012. Tickets were sold out in a few minutes. Spanning a total of twenty-six shows in nine cities, the Tone Tour reached to an audience of 550,000, more than twice the audience count of their 2009 Japanese tour, The Secret Code. TVXQ also became the third foreign artist, after Michael Jackson and the Backstreet Boys, to perform at the Tokyo Dome for three consecutive days, attracting crowds of over 165,000. The Tone tour's 550,000 audience was also the largest mobilization for any Korean artist in Japan at the time, until TVXQ broke their own record with their 2013 Japan tour Time.

With the release of their thirty-fourth Japanese single, "STILL" in March 2012, TVXQ became the first foreign artist to release ten number-one singles in Japan. By July 2012, TVXQ came to be recognized as the first foreign artist in Japan to sell over 3.1 million CD singles, breaking a ten-year, ten-month long record that was previously held by the American vocal duo, The Carpenters. The group had a fan club event tour called "The Mission" that attracted over 100,000 fans

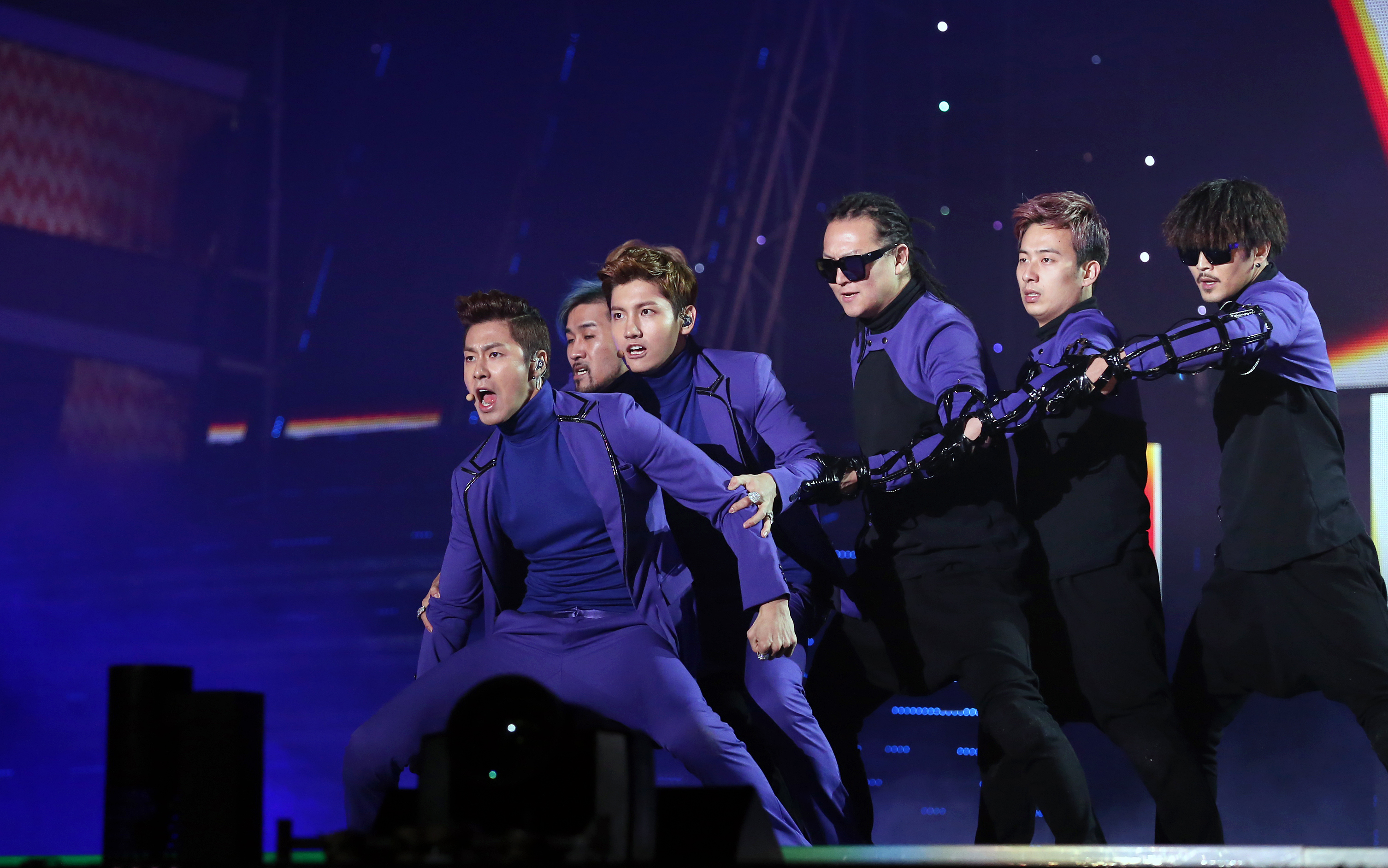
TVXQ performing Catch Me at the K-Pop World Festival 2012

TVXQ returned to South Korea in September 2012 to release their sixth Korean album Catch Me, followed by the announcement of their first world tour, the Live World Tour: Catch Me. Catch Me was released online on September 24 and on September 26 through normal commercial outlets. It became Yunho and Changmin's second number-one album and TVXQ's fifth number-one album in South Korea, and maintained its number-one position on the Gaon Albums Chart for three weeks. On November 26, TVXQ released Humanoids, the repackage of Catch Me, which also peaked at number one. Two days after the reissue's release, SM Entertainment and JYJ dropped their lawsuits against each other and reached a settlement, ending their three-year legal dispute. As part of the agreement, both parties stated that they would no longer interfere with each other's activities, and it was agreed upon that JYJ's contracts with SM Entertainment had ended in July 2009.

On January 16, 2013, TVXQ announced on their official Japanese site the release of their sixth Japanese album Time for March 6. The album became their fastest selling studio album to date, selling over 277,000 copies in its first month of release. Its lead single, "Catch Me -If You Wanna-", sold over 137,000 copies, and topped the Oricon Weekly Singles Chart, making the group the first foreign artist to have had twelve number ones on Oricon. In March the group took part in the TRF tribute album TRF Tribute Album Best for TRF's 20th anniversary. They sang a cover of "survival dAnce ~no no cry more~" and were the only Koreans to participate on the album.

TVXQ set several records with their Time tour, which commenced at the Saitama Super Arena in April 2013. The duo became the first K-pop artist and the fourth foreign artist to embark on a five-dome tour, and were the first foreign musical act to perform at the Nissan Stadium as a headlining artist. The tour attracted a record audience of 850,000 people. The tour grossed US$90 million, breaking Tone's record. On December 26–27, 2013, TVXQ held two concerts titled Time Slip at the Korea International Exhibition Center in Ilsanseo-gu, South Korea to celebrate their tenth anniversary.

=== 2014–2015: Tenth anniversary tours and military service ===
Promoted as TVXQ's tenth anniversary debut album, their seventh Korean studio album Tense was announced in November 2013. The album was released on January 6, 2014, and debuted at number one on South Korea's Gaon Albums Chart and Hanteo Albums Chart, with first-week sales of 73,100 copies. First-month shipments reached 194,198 units, making Tense the best-selling album of January 2014 in South Korea. Music critics rated Tense favorably, with a general consensus that the album is the duo's best Korean record to-date. Musically Tense has elements of neo soul with throwback-inspired pop, and it is described to be more mature than the duo's earlier efforts. The lead single "Something", a swing jazz pop number, debuted at number four on the Gaon Singles Chart and reached number seven on the Billboard Korea K-Pop Hot 100, TVXQ's highest debut on both charts. In Japan, "Something" was released as a double A-side single with "Hide & Seek" on February 5, 2014. In late February 2014, TVXQ announced their follow-up Korean single "Spellbound". An expanded version of Tense, re-titled Spellbound, was released on February 27, 2014, and debuted at number two on the Gaon Albums Chart, shipping 61,405 copies in two days.

Tree, TVXQ's seventh Japanese studio album, was released on March 5, 2014. It debuted at number one on the Oricon Albums Chart, moving 225,000 copies on its first week of release. With Tree, TVXQ became the first foreign band in Japan to have three consecutive studio albums with first-week sales of over 200,000 copies, breaking Bon Jovi's thirteen-year record. TVXQ continued to break new records with their seventh Japanese concert tour Tree: Live Tour 2014, which toured Japan from April to June. The tour drew in over 600,000 people in total, pushing the duo to become the first international artist of Japan to bring in the largest number of concertgoers in the last three years, reaching over 2 million.

On August 30, 2014, TVXQ announced their second five-Dome tour at Avex's A-Nation concert for early 2015, which went on to be their tenth anniversary tour in Japan. The tour's accompanying studio album, With, was released on December 17, 2014. It debuted at number one on the Oricon, selling 233,000 copies. Meanwhile, the duo also embarked on their world tour concert Tistory: Special Live Tour, a commemoration for their tenth year in the K-pop industry. On December 26, 2014, the duo's eleventh debut anniversary, TVXQ's wax figures at Madame Tussauds were unveiled in Shanghai. By the end of 2014, TVXQ became the 5th artist by total sales revenue in Japan in 2014, with ¥3.691 billion.

The duo entered their second hiatus when Yunho started his mandatory military service for the Republic of Korea Armed Forces on July 21, 2015. Prior to his enlistment, TVXQ released the full-length album Rise as God, which debuted at number one. Changmin joined the Military Police on November 19, 2015.

=== 2017–2024: Comeback tours, New Chapter series, fifteenth anniversaries and twentieth anniversaries ===
Yunho was honorably discharged from service on April 20, 2017, while Changmin was honorably discharged on August 18, 2017. On August 21, TVXQ announced their comeback to be a series of projects, starting with a concert. The TVXQ Special Comeback Live: Your Present held a total of three shows in Seoul and Macau from September 30 to October 15, 2017. On October 25, 2017, the duo released the Japanese compilation album Fine Collection ~Begin Again~, which comprised songs released by the duo since 2011. The album's accompanying Begin Again Tour debuted at the Sapporo Dome in November 2017 and ended at the Nissan Stadium in January 2018. TVXQ broke several records with the tour: they are the first music group in Japan to hold a three-day concert at the Nissan Stadium and are the first foreign artists to bring over a million people with one tour. The tour broke a new record for K-pop in Japan, with a total of one million tickets sold. "Reboot," the duo's first Japanese single since their hiatus, was released on December 20, 2017. The single debuted at number two on the Oricon Singles Chart, selling over 123,000 copies.

The duo started preparations for their eighth Korean studio album upon their return to Korea. New Chapter #1: The Chance of Love was released on March 28, 2018, after a two-week pre-release promotional period. Following the album's release, the duo announced the Circle #welcome Tour, which opened in Seoul's Jamsil Supplementary Stadium on May 5 and 6, 2018. The tour went on to play shows in Hong Kong and Bangkok.

New Chapter #1 debuted at number one on the Gaon Album Chart, their seventh number-one album since the chart's inception in 2010. New Chapter #1 ultimately finished the month of March at number four with 110,666 copies in Korea. The duo released their ninth full-length Japanese studio album Tomorrow on September 19, 2018, and debuted number one on the Oricon Albums Chart. The record is supported by the nationwide Tomorrow Tour from September 2018 to January 2019. With 33 stops, it was TVXQ's most expansive tour in Japan. The duo released their 46th Japanese single "Jealous" on November 21, 2018, as the lead track for their tenth Japanese album XV. It debuted at number one on the Oricon Singles Chart, their 13th time topping the chart. This broke several records, making TVXQ the foreign artist with the most number ones, most top-10s, and highest cumulative sales in Oricon Singles Chart history.

TVXQ released their extended play New Chapter #2: The Truth of Love, sequel to New Chapter #1, on December 26, 2018, day of their fifteenth debut anniversary. Similar to their 2015 album Rise as God, The Truth of Love was tagged as a "special" album release, so it was not regarded as an official studio release. Though TVXQ did not promote the record, it debuted at number two on the Gaon Album Chart. In Japan, it debuted at number 12 on the Oricon Albums Chart. Their tenth Japanese album XV, promoted as their fifteenth debut anniversary in Japan, was released on October 16, 2019. It was TVXQ's eighth album to debut atop the Oricon Albums Chart, surpassing BoA's record in becoming the first and only foreign artist in Japan to earn eight number one albums.

On May 24, 2020, amidst the COVID-19 pandemic, TVXQ held a live online concert Beyond the T, the fifth concert organized by SM Entertainment and Naver as part of Beyond LIVE, the world's first online-dedicated live concert series. On March 16, 2022, TVXQ released their Japanese extended play Epitaph to support their nation-wide Japan tour, Classyc: Live Tour, their first live concert series in three years. The tour sold 300,000 tickets across Japan.

On October 5, 2023, it was announced that TVXQ would be releasing their ninth Korean studio album 20&2 on December 26, 2023, to commemorate their twentieth anniversary within the group's special celebration project 20&2 (20th Anniversary & Two Members). The duo held their twentieth anniversary concert tour, the 20&2 Asia Tour, from December 2023 to April 2024. Immediately after the tour, they announced their Japan-wide tour, Zone Tour, beginning from November 2024 to March 2025, to celebrate their twentieth anniversary in Japan, which is supported by their eleventh Japanese studio album, Zone, to be released on November 6, 2024.

=== 2025–present: new releases ===
TVXQ released the Japanese digital single "月の裏で会いましょう" on July 20, 2025. It debuted at number three on the Oricon Digital Singles Chart.

== Artistry ==
TVXQ have labeled their lead singles as "SMP" (short for "SM Music Performance"), a supposedly experimental genre with a mix of orchestral pop, rock, hip hop, and contemporary R&B, topped with harmonizing vocals and high notes as well as dynamic dance routines. Many of TVXQ's songs feature lyrics with dark social commentary.

TVXQ's musical style has evolved over the years. Dance-pop and contemporary R&B ballads persisted throughout their releases, and they have released a cappella versions of their music. In their first two albums, TVXQ explored rap rock, and have collaborated with the rock band TRAX in those attempts. With their fourth Korean album Mirotic (2008), TVXQ delved into urban contemporary and electropop, and the album's lead single "Mirotic", a song marked by heavy-urban dance and Europop sounds, is considered one of the staple songs of K-pop. In the albums after the split, Yunho and Changmin experimented with more electronic dance music, traditional R&B, and pop songs with strong hip hop cadences. However, the duo's tenth anniversary album, Tense (2014), saw a drastic change in TVXQ's musical direction, in which acoustic genres such as adult contemporary pop music took focus.

TVXQ's dance choreography has been called "intense and powerful". Their stage performances have been described as "imaginative" and "captivating", with Yunho and Changmin being lauded for their stability and stamina to perform live, with some live concert sets lasting for more than three hours. On an episode of Mnet's Idol Chart Show that aired on May 4, 2011, TVXQ was ranked number one among music removed (MR) idol singers.

== Filmography ==
The five original members of TVXQ made their first appearance as actors in 2005, through the sitcom Rainbow Romance and their own seven-episode miniseries titled Banjun Theatre. In 2006, TVXQ starred in their second miniseries Vacation, also releasing a soundtrack.

In 2012, Yunho and Changmin appeared in the biographical movie I AM., a film that contained interviews from SM Town artists. The duo was featured in another SM Town film, the concert documentary SM Town: The Stage, in August 2015. In April 2016, during the duo's hiatus, they released their own Japanese concert film, Till, in Japan. In May 2018, the duo made cameo appearances on the television special drama Tensai Bakabon, playing as two hotel porters who appear again ten years later as members of a popular band.

== Controversy ==
=== Lyrics of "Mirotic" ===
In November 2008, the Korean Commission of Youth Protection ruled that "Mirotic" was detrimental to youths and declared that the lyrics were provocative and overly sexual. As a result, the album was labeled with stickers indicating that it was unsuitable for people under 19 years old and any performances of the song would have to be broadcast after 10 PM. In response to the ruling, SM Entertainment agreed to make a clean version but also had filed an injunction to overrule the commission's decision. The lyrics were changed from "I got you" to "I chose you" and "I got you under my skin" to "I got you under my sky." In March 2009, the Seoul Administrative Court ruled in favor of SM Entertainment. The Commission of Youth Protection announced they would appeal the ruling to a high court after having an emergency meeting and deeming that the phrase, "I got you under my skin", was inappropriate for minors.

=== Lawsuit against SM Entertainment ===
On July 31, 2009, three of the members—Hero Jaejoong, Micky Yoochun, and Xiah Junsu—submitted an application to the Seoul Central District Court to determine the validity of their contract with their management agency, SM Entertainment. Through their lawyers, the trio stated that the 13-year contract was excessively long, schedules were held out without the confirmation or permission of the members, contract terms had been extended and changed without their knowledge or consent, and that the group's earnings were not fairly distributed to the members. Early termination penalty of their contract would cost them twice the profit that the group was estimated to earn for SM Entertainment in the rest of the contract period. The news of their lawsuit was enough to cause SM Entertainment's stock price to drop over 10%.

The Seoul Central District Court granted the three members a temporary contract injunction in October 2009 and stated that SM Entertainment could not interfere with their individual activities, thus placing a halt on TVXQ's group activities in South Korea. The members claimed that the contract was unfair and that they were left out of proper profit distribution. In response, SM Entertainment called a press conference and claimed that the lawsuit was not about unfair contracts or human rights, but motivated by the three members' greed to pursue their cosmetics business uninhibited by the restrictions of their exclusive contract with SM Entertainment. The agency submitted a complaint on criminal misdemeanor charges against the cosmetics company CreBeau; however, it was never brought to court by the prosecutor on grounds of insufficient evidence. The three replied that they hoped SM Entertainment would respect the court's decision.

In response to the lawsuit, 120,000 TVXQ fans filed a petition against SM Entertainment's long-term contracts to the Seoul District Court. The Korean chapter of TVXQ's fanclub, Cassiopeia, also filed for compensation from SM Entertainment for the cancelled SM Town Live Concert, as both SM Entertainment and TVXQ initially stated that the concert would go on as planned. The concert was canceled a week before its scheduled date. TVXQ's Mirotic Asia Tour Concert in Shenzhen, which was scheduled to be held on November 21, 2009, was also canceled.

Though TVXQ's activities in Korea were ceased, the three continued activities as TVXQ members until the end of the year in Japan, where they were managed by Avex. On April 3, 2010, Avex announced the indefinite suspension of TVXQ's Japanese activities. The three, later known as JYJ, signed a new contract with Avex to form a new special unit, which was announced on April 13, 2010. The trio released their debut Japanese EP, The... in September 2010. On February 17, 2011, the Seoul Central District Court dismissed SM Entertainment's injunction against the three, filed in April 2010 for damage compensation. In September 2012, the final decision on the case was postponed indefinitely by the Seoul Central District Court for mediation under the justice department.

The lawsuit came to an end on November 28, 2012, with both parties mutually agreeing to withdraw their lawsuits, stating that the three members' contracts came to an end on July 31, 2009, and that both parties would mutually not interfere with each other's activities. An SM official was quoted as saying, "We made a judgment that we don't have to manage the three members of JYJ any longer as they expressed their intention not to keep their activity as TVXQ" and further added that they have decided to end the litigation "to avoid bringing additional harm to U-Know Yunho and Max Changmin, who are active as TVXQ, and to avoid making any more unneeded issues".

== Legacy ==
TVXQ are credited to be one of the first South Korean artists to popularize K-pop in Japan and internationally. Multiple international and local media outlets have dubbed TVXQ as "K-pop legends" and "K-pop royalty" for their accomplishments and contributions to the Hallyu, which refers to the global rise and spread of Korean pop culture. The Korea Times had referred to TVXQ as "a pillar of [K-pop's] expansion to the rest of Asia. According to K-pop critic Jung Min-jae, TVXQ started a new standard for current K-pop idols, asserting them as the "goal of an idol group." TVXQ's success after their debut in 2004 led to a resurgence of idol groups in Korean entertainment. Their work have influenced various artists including Jonghyun of SHINee, Kang Seung-yoon of Winner, Jung Dae-hyun and Zelo of B.A.P, L of Infinite, Xiumin and Baekhyun of EXO, Seulgi of Red Velvet, Yuta of NCT, Moonbyul of Mamamoo, Hwang Min-hyun, Samuel, Lu Han, Shokichi of Exile, Solidemo, and Ryōki Nagae.

TVXQ's ability to deliver solid live performances with synchronized dance choreography, backed by the production of stylish, high-quality music videos, had blazed a trail for other Korean idol groups to follow suit, laying the foundation for the current "K-pop worldview". They are one of the oldest idol groups to still tour consistently, and has been named by Forbes in the Korea Power Celebrity 40 list as one of the most powerful celebrities from South Korea for 2014.

Their popularity in Japan is said to rival even the most popular local artists. The Oricon credited TVXQ as the reason why K-pop girl groups like Girls' Generation and Kara became popular in Japan. They are the first Korean artists to cover the Japanese edition of Rolling Stone, and are the best-selling foreign touring artist in the country. Over a million people attended their Begin Again Tour from 2017 to 2018, more than any other concert tour that year.

TVXQ's influence in the K-pop industry went beyond music. Former members' Jaejoong, Yoochun, and Junsu's lawsuit against SM Entertainment brought attention to "slave contracts", referring to a management company's unfair treatment towards their artists. It paved the way for contract negotiations of future stars, and has led to several reforms and law changes by South Korea's Fair Trade Commission (KFTC), including a new rule that limited entertainment contracts to seven years, and reducing financial penalties for entertainers that break their contracts early. According to The Korea Herald, ten entertainment agencies in Korea changed their artist contracts from thirteen years to seven after the lawsuit. The trio's lawsuit against SM Entertainment has been described as "historic".

=== Fan club ===
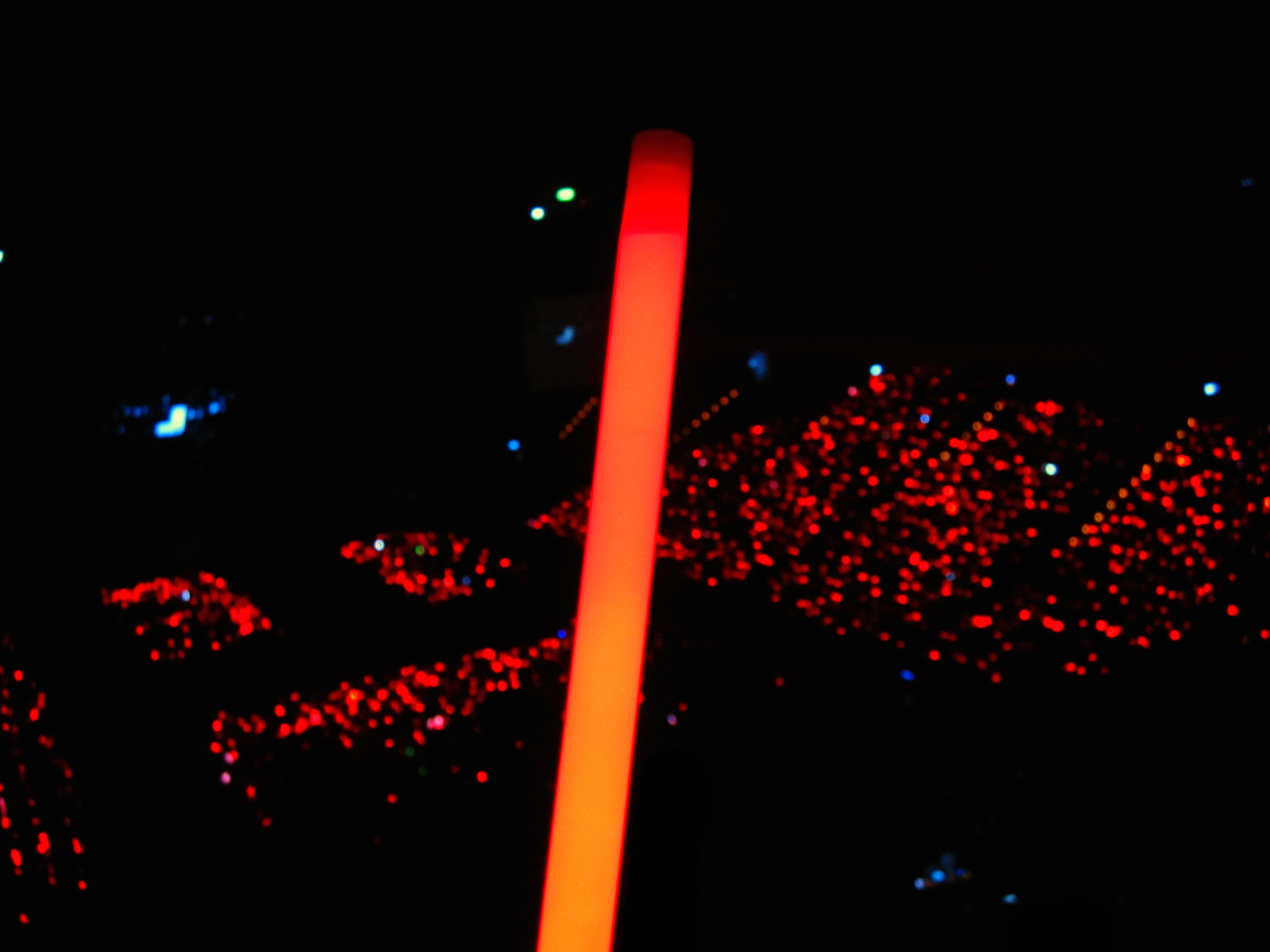
Red light stick used at TVXQ concerts

The official fanclubs of TVXQ are Cassiopeia in South Korea and Bigeast in Japan. Their fandom color is red. According to news sources in 2008, Cassiopeia was listed in the Guinness Book of Records as "the world's largest fanclub" with more than 800,000 official members. However, the Guinness World Records later stated that "[w]e currently have a category for the largest fanclub for a group, but no record has yet been set and we haven't been provided with any evidence". TVXQ was also reported to have made it into the Guinness World Records in 2009 for being the Most Photographed Celebrities in the World, which was also directly refuted by Guinness World Records.

120,000 Cassiopeia members filed a petition with the Seoul District Court in 2010 against SM Entertainment's long-term contracts, after Jaejoong, Yoochun, and Junsu's lawsuit against the management. Cassiopeia also filed for compensation from SM Entertainment for the canceled SM Town Live Concert, as both SM and TVXQ initially stated that the concert would go on as planned. The concert was canceled a week before its scheduled date.

== Other ventures ==
=== Endorsements ===
TVXQ have endorsed products such as LG Mobile, Samsung's Anycall, sportswear Fila, and Oronamin C. Some of their songs have even been used as theme songs for television shows, commercials and motion pictures; (Note: For a complete list of the commercial tie-ins of TVXQ's songs, see their discography.) such as One Piece, Chevrolet and Subaru. In 2011, the newly reformed TVXQ duo landed endorsement deals in Korea with brands such as Nike, The Shilla Duty Free, Pepsi NEX Zero, Missha, and most recently with Lacoste. In Japan, they have endorsed Seven & i Holdings, 7-Eleven products, the Seibu Silver card, 7-net shopping, and Ezaki Glico ice cream products.

On August 14, 2012, Missha launched a new limited-edition TVXQ perfume set and had a special TVXQ fan signing event at the Missha store in Myeong-dong. On September 10, 2012, Missha announced that TVXQ had signed an exclusive contract with them to represent the brand worldwide and that their advertisements would soon be featured in some 1,000 stores across Asia.

=== Other activities ===
In 2005, the Los Angeles Tourism Corporation launched the "See My L.A." campaign. TVXQ, along with label-mate BoA, became the spokespeople for the campaign. Since April 2007, TVXQ host their own weekly radio program, TVXQ Bigeastation on the Japan FM Network. On March 28, 2008, TVXQ was chosen as the "Goodwill Ambassador for Asia" by Universal Studios Japan in order to further promote the attractions of the USJ. TVXQ were also chosen to be the new faces for the Lotte duty-free shop, due to their popularity throughout Asia.

== Awards and achievements ==
TVXQ are known for breaking numerous sales and attendance records in Japan. In 2008, with the release of their 16th Japanese single "Purple Line", TVXQ became the first foreign boy band and the second Korean artist after BoA to top the weekly Oricon Singles Chart in Japan. Their 23rd Japanese single "Dōshite Kimi o Suki ni Natte Shimattandarō?" was TVXQ's third single to top the Oricon, hitting a record for a non-Japanese Asian music act in Japan. Their 29th Japanese single "Break Out!" released in 2010 was the fastest-selling single by a foreign act in Japan, breaking a record previously held by Elton John. Their greatest hits album Best Selection 2010 was TVXQ's first album to debut atop the weekly Oricon Albums Chart and the first album by a foreign artist to sell over 400,000 copies in one week, breaking Bon Jovi's record fourteen years prior.

With the release of TVXQ's 31st Japanese single "Keep Your Head Down" in 2011, the band's first single after the split, TVXQ extended their record for weekly singles sales in Japan by a foreign music act. The duo's 42nd Japanese single "Time Works Wonders", released in 2014, pushed TVXQ's CD single sales in Japan to 4.09 million copies, making TVXQ the best-selling foreign music act in CD singles of all time. TVXQ have 34 top ten singles and 12 number-one singles, the most by any foreign artist in Japan. TVXQ's 2014 Japanese album With also broke several records in a row: With was TVXQ's fourth consecutive number-one album and their fourth consecutive album to surpass 200,000 copies in its first week of release, breaking yet another record that was previously set by Bon Jovi in Japan.

TVXQ are the first Korean idol group invited to perform at the Kōhaku Uta Gassen, Japan's most prestigious New Year Eve's music festival. They performed there three times, from 2008 to 2011. TVXQ are the first Korean music group to headline their own concert at the Tokyo Dome (The Secret Code Tour in 2009), the first foreign group to embark on a dome tour in Japan (Time Tour in 2013), and the first foreign artist to perform at the Nissan Stadium (Time Tour). Their Begin Again Tour in 2017 was the highest-attended tour ever held by a foreign music act in Japan, selling over a million tickets. With over 12.1 million albums sold, TVXQ are one of best-selling K-pop artists of all time. According to the South China Morning Post, TVXQ were estimated to be worth at least US$30 million in August 2022.

== Members ==
Current

- U-Know Yunho – Leader
- Max Changmin

Former

- Hero Jaejoong
- Micky Yoochun
- Xiah Junsu

== Discography ==
Korean albums

- Tri-Angle (2004)
- Rising Sun (2005)
- "O"-Jung.Ban.Hap. (2006)
- Mirotic (2008)
- Keep Your Head Down (2011)
- Catch Me (2012)
- Tense (2014)
- Rise as God (2015)
- New Chapter #1: The Chance of Love (2018)
- 20&2 (2023)

Japanese albums

- Heart, Mind and Soul (2006)
- Five in the Black (2007)
- T (2008)
- The Secret Code (2009)
- Tone (2011)
- Time (2013)
- Tree (2014)
- With (2014)
- Tomorrow (2018)
- XV (2019)
- Zone (2024)

== Concerts and tours ==
=== Headlining ===
International tours

- Rising Sun: The 1st Asia Tour (2006)
- O: The 2nd Asia Tour (2007–08)
- Mirotic: The 3rd Asia Tour (2009)
- Catch Me: Live World Tour (2012–13)
- Tistory: Special Live Tour (2014–15)
- Circle Tour (2018–19)
- 20&2 Asia Tour (2023–24)

Co-headlining

- SM Town Live '08 (2008–09)
- SM Town Live '10 World Tour (2010–11)
- SM Town Live World Tour III (2012–13)
- SM Town Live World Tour IV (2014–15)
- SM Town Live World Tour VI (2018)
- SM Town Live Culture Humanity (2021)
- SM Town Live 2022: SMCU Express at Kwangya (2022)
- SM Town Live 2022: SMCU Express at Human City Suwon (2022)
- SM Town Live 2023: SMCU Palace at Kwangya (2023)
- SM Town Live 2025: The Culture, the Future (2025)

Japan tours

- Heart, Mind and Soul: Live Tour (2006)
- Five in the Black: Live Tour (2007)
- T: Live Tour (2008)
- The Secret Code: Live Tour (2009)
- Tone: Live Tour (2012)
- Time: Live Tour (2013)
- Tree: Live Tour (2014)
- With: Live Tour (2015)
- Begin Again: Live Tour (2017–18)
- Tomorrow: Live Tour (2018–19)
- XV: Live Tour (2019–20)
- Classyc: Live Tour (2023)
- Zone: 20th Anniversary Live Tour (2024–25)

Online concerts

- TVXQ: Beyond the T (2020)

=== Music festivals ===
- Korean Music Festival (2004, 2008, 2015)
- A-Nation (2005–09, Headliner 2011–14, 2018–19, 2024)
- SM Summer Town Festival (2006)
- SMTown Summer Concert (2007)
- SMTown Week: Time Slip (2013)

== See also ==
- Honorific nicknames in popular music
- List of South Korean boy bands
- List of J-pop artists
- List of songs by TVXQ

== Publications ==
- The Prince in Prague, Aimhigh Global (December 9, 2006) ISBN 89-958968-1-7
- Bonjour Paris, SM Entertainment (November 24, 2007) Unknown ID 8809049752800
- TVXQ Off Stage + Singles, The Book Company (December 22, 2008) Unknown ID 2239010700008
- Tohoshinki: El Sol, Gentosha (October 29, 2011) ISBN 978-4-344-02077-1, ISBN 4-344-02077-4
- TVXQ! HELiOPHiLiA!, SM Entertainment (September 30, 2016) ISBN 9791187290032
- Life is a Journey, SM Entertainment (January 31, 2019) ISBN 9791187290148
