= Troll Factory =

2024 film by Ahn Gooc-jin

- Theatrical release poster
- Hangul: 댓글부대
- Hanja: 댓글部隊
- Lit.: Comment Army
- RR: Daetgeul budae
- MR: Taekkŭl pudae
- Directed by: Ahn Gooc-jin
- Screenplay by: Ahn Gooc-jin
- Based on: The Comments Army by Chang Kang-myoung
- Produced by: Seo Yeon
- Starring: Son Suk-ku; Kim Sung-cheol; Kim Dong-hwi; Hong Kyung
- Cinematography: Cho Hyung-rae
- Edited by: Han Mi-yeon
- Music by: Cho Young-wook
- Production companies: Cinematic Moment; Dmix Studio; Oneweek
- Distributed by: Acemaker Movieworks
- Release date: March 27, 2024
- Running time: 109 minutes
- Country: South Korea
- Language: Korean
- Box office: US$6.7 million

Troll Factory (Korean: 댓글부대) is a 2024 South Korean crime thriller film directed and written by Ahn Gooc-jin, and starring Son Suk-ku, Kim Sung-cheol, Kim Dong-hwi, and Hong Kyung. Based on the novel of the same Korean name by Chang Kang-myoung, a work based on the National Intelligence Service's illegal election intervention case. The film is about a public opinion manipulation company that infiltrates Internet sites and manipulates public opinion by leaving malicious comments. It was released on March 27, 2024.

== Plot ==
A talented but overly conceited journalist, Im Sang-jin, is investigating corporate corruption involving the conglomerate Manjeon. However, his report is later revealed to be false, leading to his suspension. One day, a mysterious informant approaches him, claiming to have manipulated public opinion online.

== Cast ==
- Son Suk-ku as Im Sang-jin, a newspaper reporter seeking reinstatement after being suspended for writing an article exposing the tyranny of a large corporation.
- Kim Sung-cheol as Jjingppeotking, the de facto leader who takes the lead in manipulating public opinion.
- Kim Dong-hwi as Chattatkat, an anonymous writer who creates hooked stories and an informant.
- Hong Kyung as Paeptaek, a keyboard warrior who becomes increasingly addicted to the power of online public opinion manipulation.
- Lee Seon-hee as Pyo Ha-jeong, editor-in-chief of a newspaper company.
- Kim Jun-han as Nam Ki-hong, the head of the public opinion team.
- Oh Ye-ju as Lee Eun-chae, a college student.

== Production ==
=== Development ===
The film developed under the working title The Comments Army and director Ahn Gooc-jin, who directed Alice in Earnestland (2015) took the megaphone.

It is produced by Cinematic Moment and distributed by Acemaker Movieworks.

=== Casting ===
Son Suk-ku was offered the role of the main character in July 2022.

The appearance of Son along with Kim Dong-hwi were confirmed in January 2023. Followed by Kim Sung-cheol and Hong Kyung in February 2023.

=== Production design ===
Art Director Hong Joo-hee, who worked on The School Nurse Files (2020), My Name (2021) and The Moon (2023), contributes to the film's unique visual identity with a realistic and original production design. Costume Designer Jo Sang-kyung, who worked on Along with the Gods: The Two Worlds (2017), Squid Game (2020–present), and Hunt (2022), brings her expertise to craft unique and distinct character portrayals through the costumes.

=== Filming ===
Principal photography began on March 6, 2023.

=== Visual effects ===
Cinematographer Cho Hyung-rae, who worked on The Merciless (2017), Kingmaker (2022), Kill Boksoon (2023) and Concrete Utopia (2023), and Lighting Director Lee Gil-gyu who worked on Tune in for Love (2019), Kingmaker (2022), Concrete Utopia (2023) and Citizen of a Kind (2024) have combined their talents to craft the film's overall visual concept.

== Music ==
Music Director Cho Young-wook, who worked on A Taxi Driver (2017), The Man Standing Next (2020), Hunt (2022), Decision to Leave (2022), Narco-Saints (2022) and Honey Sweet (2023), will compose the score, creating a unique atmosphere for the film to take place.

== Accolades ==
Award ceremony	Year	Category	Nominee	Result	Ref.
Director's Cut Awards	2025	Best New Actor (Film)	Hong Kyung	Nominated	
