= Song Young-gyu =

South Korean actor (1970–2025)

- Portrait of Song
- Born: April 18, 1970
- Died: August 4, 2025 (aged 55); Yongin, South Korea
- Occupation: Actor
- Years active: 1994–2025

Korean name
- Hangul: 송영규
- RR: Song Yeonggyu
- MR: Song Yŏnggyu

Song Young-gyu (Korean: 송영규; April 18, 1970 – August 4, 2025) was a South Korean actor.

== Life and career ==
Song was born on April 18, 1970. He graduated with a bachelor's degree in Theater from Seoul Institute of the Arts.

Song made his debut in 1994 with a role in the children's musical based on the animated show Taoist Meoteol, and steadily appeared on stage thereafter. His theater experience helped him improve his acting skills and he subsequently made his film debut in the 2002 movie Turn It Up, which was followed by his TV debut in the 2007 drama Merry Mary. He would become best known for his supporting role as the gruff squad chief in the 2019 box office hit Extreme Job, and to international audiences for his roles in Netflix’s Narco-Saints and Disney+’s Big Bet, both released in 2022.

He was also a special professor in the Department of Acting Arts at Semyung University.

On August 4, 2025, Song was found dead inside a parked vehicle in Yongin, Gyeonggi Province, police said. He was 55. Authorities said there were no signs of foul play. An investigation is ongoing, with plans to question family members to determine the circumstances surrounding his death.
