= Big Bet (TV series) =

2022 South Korean television series

- Also known as: King of Savvy
- Hangul: 카지노
- Lit.: Casino
- RR: Kajino
- MR: K'ajino
- Genre: Crime; Action; Black comedy
- Written by: Kang Yun-seong
- Directed by: Kang Yun-seong; Nam Ki-hoon
- Starring: Choi Min-sik; Son Suk-ku; Lee Dong-hwi
- Music by: Yoon Il-sang
- Country of origin: South Korea
- Original languages: Korean; English; Filipino
- No. of seasons: 2
- No. of episodes: 16

Production
- Executive producers: Song Min-joo; Park Byeong-cheol
- Producers: Ahn Chang-hyeon; Baek Chang-joo; Jang Won-seok
- Production locations: South Korea; Philippines
- Editors: Heo Seon-mi; Han Young-gyu
- Running time: 49–58 minutes
- Production companies: Arc Media; B.A. Entertainment; C-JeS Entertainment
- Budget: ₩20 billion

Original release
- Network: Disney+
- Release: December 21, 2022 – March 22, 2023

Big Bet (Korean: 카지노) is a 2022 South Korean television series directed by Kang Yun-seong, starring Choi Min-sik, Son Suk-ku, and Lee Dong-hwi. The series revolves around a legendary figure in the Philippines' casino world. The first season premiered on December 21, 2022, and aired every Wednesday at 14:00 (KST) on Disney+ in selected territories and on Hulu in the United States. The second season premiered on February 15, 2023, and aired every Wednesday at 14:00 (KST).

== Synopsis ==
Big Bet tells the story of a man who rises to the top as a casino kingpin in the Philippines but experiences unfortunate events. After being charged for a murder that he did not commit, he faces the ultimate bet with his life on the line to get back in the game.

== Cast ==
=== Main ===
- Choi Min-sik as Cha Mu-sik
  - Lee Kyu-hyung as young Cha Mu-sik
  - Song Min-jae as child Cha Mu-sik

A casino mogul whose world turns upside down when he becomes involved in a murder case, leading him back into the gambling scene.

- Son Suk-ku as Oh Seung-hoon

A cop who is dispatched to the Philippines to handle international criminal cases. He chases Cha Mu-sik to solve the murder case.

- Lee Dong-hwi as Yang Jeong-pal

Mu-sik's handler.

=== Supporting ===
==== People around Cha Mu-sik ====
- Kim Roi-ha as Cha Kyung-deok

Mu-sik's father.

- Bae Hae-sun as Lee Sook-ja

Mu-sik's mother.

- Jin Seon-kyu as So Jin-seok

Mu-sik's teacher.

- Jo Han-chul as Kim Gye-jang

A person who scouted and trained Mu-sik, who wanted to enlist in the Marine Corps.

- Lee Moon-sik as Park Jong-hyun

A detective and Mu-sik's friend.

==== People in the Casino Bar Korea ====
- Heo Dong-won as Lee Sang-cheol

An employee of Mu-sik's Casino Bar in Daejeon who made gambling game machines

- Kim Min-jae as Ahn Chi-young

President of Daemang Electronics and Mu-sik's partner

==== National Tax Service staff ====
- Ryu Hyun-kyung as Kang Min-jung

The team leader at National Tax Service

- Go Yoon as Choi Il-ho

A civil servant at National Tax Service

==== People at casinos in the Philippines ====
- Kim Hong-pa as Min Seok-joon
- Heo Sung-tae as Seo Tae-seok

An illegal business entrepreneur in Korea who fled to the Philippines, then made a connection with Mu-sik.

- Son Eun-seo as Kim So-jung

A hotel manager who predicts a subtle relationship with Jeong-pal.

- Lee Hye-young as Ko Yeong-hee

A casino gamer and president of Pastera.

- Lee Hae-woo as Phillip

Casino agent.

==== People at Caliz ====
- Nico Antonio as Mark Flores

An operative of the CIDG and Seung-hoon's partner.

- Bembol Roco as Daniel

Also known as Big Boss, the Godfather of casinos in the Philippines and Kingmaker.

- Epy Quizon as Raul

Mayor of Agiles City

- Kim Min as John

Daniel's right-hand man.

- Jeffrey Santos as Jose Tarragona

Tax officer in Agiles City and partner of Jin Young-hee

==== Others ====
- Im Hyung-joon as Jo Yoon-ki

A consul dispatched to the Philippines, and he is in constant confrontation with Mu-sik.

- Oh Dal-su as Lee Joon-goo

The president of the Korean club, he is a bridge connecting Oh Seung-hoon and the Korean residents.

- Kim Joo-ryoung as Jin Young-hee

The owner of a samgyeopsal restaurant in Manila.

- Park Ya-seong as Han Seong-il

A senior in the Iljin who bullies Cha Moo-sik.

- Lee Do-gun as Cho Yoon-bae

A detective who was in charge of the fraud case of Sang-cheon in the past.

- Ho Jo as Han Su-jin

Cha Mu-sik's ex wife.

- Ryu Sung-hyun as Kim Geun-suk

A member of the Busan Yeongdo group.

- Song Young-gyu as Choi Chil-goo

CEO of Mindong Construction.

- Jo Jae-yoon
- Jung Woong-in
- Hong Ki-joon
- Lee Dae-gun
- Min Sung-wook
- Ronnie Lazaro as Carlos
- Art Acuña as PNP Commissioner
- Kiko Matos as NBI agent Terrence Manos
- Rose Van Ginkel as Rose
- Guji Lorenzana
- Babyerna Liong
- Roeder Camañag

=== Special appearances ===
- Lee Je-hoon as Jang Jun
- Choi Moo-sung as Mr. Na

== Episodes ==
Season	Episodes	Originally released	
Season	Episodes	First released	Last released
1	8	December 21, 2022	January 25, 2023
2	8	February 15, 2023	March 22, 2023

=== Season 1 ===
No. overall	Episode	Title	Original release date
Season 1
1	1	"Casino Bar"; Transliteration: "Kajino Ba" (Korean: 카지노 바)	December 21, 2022
Cha Mu-sik's ordinary life changes when his hometown friend, Ahn Chi-young visits and suggests they start a gambling business.
2	2	"Tax Bomb"; Transliteration: "Segeumpoktan" (Korean: 세금폭탄)	December 21, 2022
National Tax Service is cracking down on the casino bar that Mu-sik and Chi-young operated. Chi-young is arrested, but Mu-sik left and flees to the Philippines. Mu-sik loses all his money from gambling and borrows money to Lee Sang-gu in Manila.
3	3	"The Ten-Year Debt"; Transliteration: "10nyeon Mug-eun Chaegwon" (Korean: 10년 묵은 채권)	December 21, 2022
Mu-sik and Min Seok-jun became business partner. He then meet Kang Min-jung to fix his tax issues and additional fines. Seok-jun instruct Mu-sik to collect the bonds that are ten years overdue and use whatever means to collect all of it.
4	4	"Rolling"; Transliteration: "Rolring" (Korean: 롤링)	December 28, 2022
Mu-sik gains full authority over the casino and earns sixty billion won over ten years.
5	5	"The Game Plan"; Transliteration: "Seolgye" (Korean: 설계)	January 4, 2023
Professor Na introduced Jung Suk-woo, a financer, to Mu-sik. Mu-sik starts to work on him, who lets his guard down.
6	6	"Korean Desk"; Transliteration: "Kori-an Deseukeu" (Korean: 코리안 데스크)	January 11, 2023
Oh Seung-hoon of the Korean Desk is dispatched to the Philippines, and meets his partner, Mark. He then briefed on the situation in Caliz.
7	7	"The Sugarcane Field Murder"; Transliteration: "Satangsusubat Sar-insageon" (Korean: 사탕수수밭 살인사건)	January 18, 2023
The bodies of two dead Koreans are found cuddled in a sugar cane field. Mu-sik and Seung-hoon head to the scene separately and investigate to find evidences.
8	8	"The Kidnapping"; Transliteration: "Napchi" (Korean: 납치)	January 25, 2023
Upon hearing Yang Jeong-pal's plea, Mu-sik kidnaps Ham Deok-bae and demands to repay the money he borrowed from Jeong-pal. The Korean Embassy found it out.

=== Season 2 ===
No. overall	Episode	Title	Original release date
9	1	"Mortal Enemies"; Transliteration: "Dol-a-ol Su Eobsneun Gang" (Korean: 돌아올 수 없는 강)	February 15, 2023
Seo Tae-seok quietly trespass to Mu-sik's house with a gun to kill him but failed as he is overpowered. Mu-sik warned Tae-seok to leave the Philippines within seventy-two hours or else there'll be something happen to him.
10	2	"Assassins"; Transliteration: "Amsaljadeul" (Korean: 암살자들)	February 15, 2023
Yangdo gang members went to the Philippines to deal with Mu-sik and trap him with the help of Mr. Woo. Mu-sik finds himself in danger as he is lock in the trunk of a car and drives into the river by Tae-seok.
11	3	"Mayfly"; Transliteration: "Harusbam Insaeng" (Korean: 하룻밤 인생)	February 15, 2023
Mu-sik meets with the Triad boss to solve Jeong-pal's debt, threatening Chen Kuan not to lay a finger to Jeong-pal. Meanwhile, Seung-hoon still investigates the murder case of Kim So-jung and Philip.
12	4	"Framed"; Transliteration: "Numyeong" (Korean: 누명)	February 22, 2023
Seok-jun shot and kill instantly, Mu-sik arrested as the prime suspect and Seung-hoon starts his investigation to Korea Town.
13	5	"The Last Ruling"; Transliteration: "Majimak Pangyeolsu" (Korean: 마지막 판결수)	March 1, 2023
Mu-sik deported to South Korea as the murder suspect of Seok-jun but pleads not guilty to the prosecution. He promises to cooperate with the investigation and gives information to the prosecutor.
14	6	"Comeback"; Transliteration: "Bokgwi" (Korean: 복귀)	March 8, 2023
Mu-sik returns to the Philippines and a lot has changed in the casino.
15	7	"To Be or Not To Be"; Transliteration: "Jukneunya Saneunya" (Korean: 죽느냐 사느냐)	March 15, 2023
Mu-sik began his revenge to those people who framed him on Seok-jun's murder.
16	8	"Forced Repatriation"; Transliteration: "Gangjesonghwan" (Korean: 강제송환)	March 22, 2023
Jeong-pal destroyed the lockers in the basement of Mu-sik's house, found out the passport of So-jung and Philip and felt betrayed and is pissed off. Mu-sik feels uneasy while talking to his wife, he then goes to his house in the Philippines only to find out all the money are gone. Mu-sik went to remote location, calls Jeong-pal to withdraw the rest of the money from his bank account and bring it to him. Jeong-pal, Sang-gu, Seung-hoon, Mark and John went to Mu-sik's hideout. A gunfight emerge and only Jeong-pal and Seung-hoon made it out alive.

== Production ==
The filming began in February 2022. In May 2022, it was reported that filming was currently taking place in the Philippines. In June, it was reported that the series recently finished filming in the Philippines and was currently filming in Korea. Filming ended on August 3, 2022.

The series is planned as a two-season series and both seasons consist of eight episodes each.

== Release ==
The first three episodes were released on December 21, 2022, and the rest was released as one new episode every week. 2–3 weeks after the first season, a second season which also consists of 8 episodes, was released. The release of the second season started on February 15, 2023.

== Awards and nominations ==
Name of the award ceremony, year presented, category, nominee(s) of the award, and the result of the nomination
Award ceremony	Year	Category	Nominee / Work	Result	Ref.
Asia Contents Awards & Global OTT Awards	2023	Best Visual Effects	Big Bet	Nominated	
Baeksang Arts Awards	2023	Best Actor (TV)	Choi Min-sik	Nominated	
Blue Dragon Series Awards	2023	Best Drama	Big Bet	Won	
Blue Dragon Series Awards	2023	Best Actor	Choi Min-sik	Nominated	
Blue Dragon Series Awards	2023	Best Supporting Actor	Lee Dong-hwi	Won	
Blue Dragon Series Awards	2023	Best Supporting Actress	Kim Joo-ryoung	Nominated	
Director's Cut Awards	2023	Best Director in Television	Kang Yoon-sung, Nam Gi-hoon	Nominated	
Director's Cut Awards	2023	Best Screenplay	Kang Yoon-sung	Nominated	
Director's Cut Awards	2023	Best Actress in Television	Lee Hye-young	Nominated	
Director's Cut Awards	2023	Best Actor in Television	Choi Min-sik	Nominated	
Director's Cut Awards	2023	Best New Actress in Television	Son Eun-seo	Nominated	
Director's Cut Awards	2023	Best New Actor in Television	Lee Hae-woo	Nominated	
Seoul International Drama Awards	2023	Golden Bird Prize for Program	Big Bet	Won	
Seoul International Drama Awards	2023	Golden Bird Prize for Individual	Choi Min-sik	Won	
