= Yunho =

South Korean musician (born 1986)

- 윤호
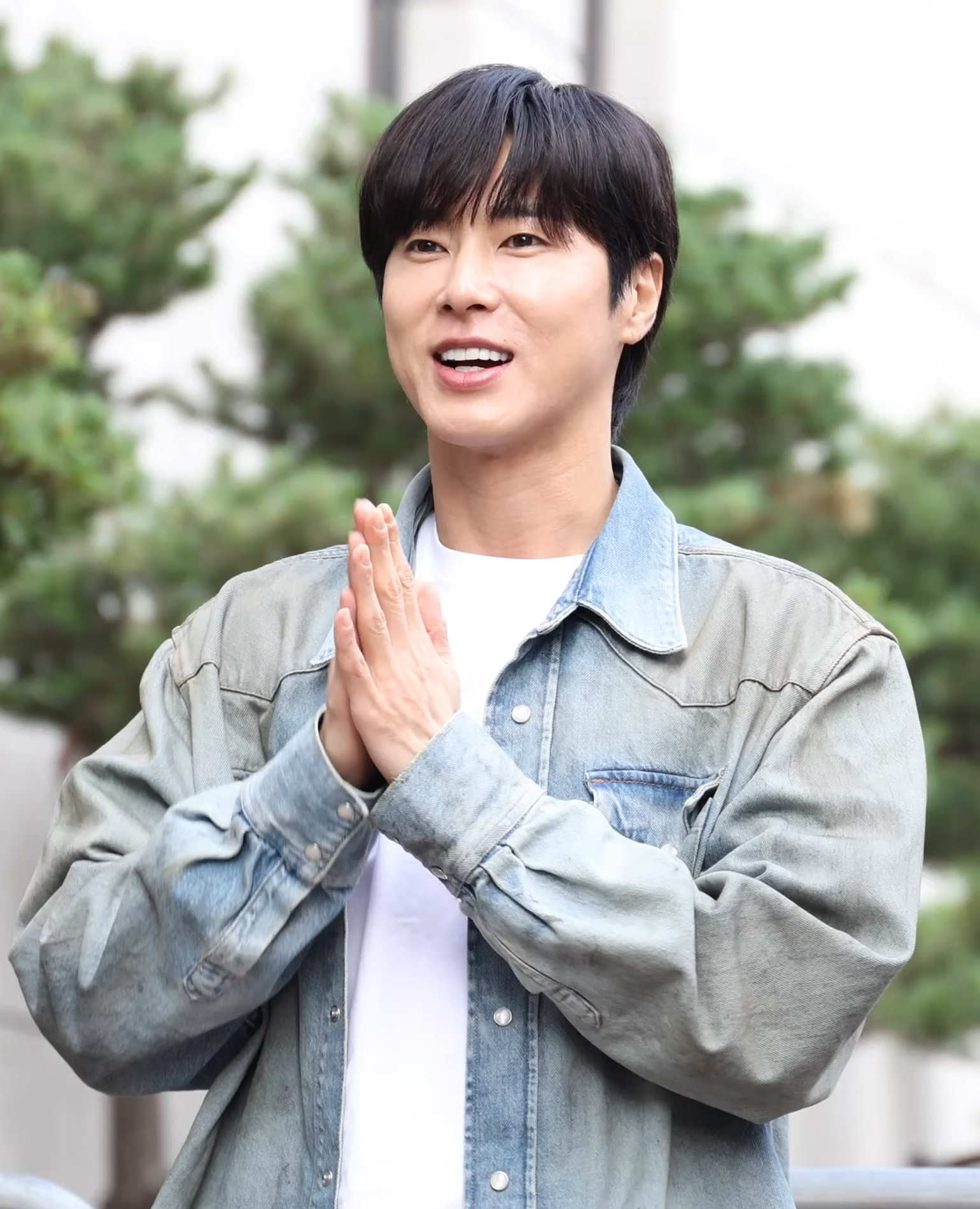
- Yunho in 2023
- Born: Jung Yunho; February 6, 1986 (age 40); Gwangsan, Gwangju, South Korea
- Other names: UK; Jung Yunho
- Education: Myongji University; Chungwoon University
- Occupations: Singer-songwriter; dancer; actor
- Years active: 2003–present
- Musical career
- Genres: K-pop; Pop; dance; R&B; electronic; rock; ballad
- Instrument: Vocals
- Labels: SM; Avex Trax; Rhythm Zone
- Member of: TVXQ; SM Town; SM The Performance
- Website: u-know.smtown.com

Korean name
- Hangul: 정윤호
- Hanja: 鄭允浩
- RR: Jeong Yunho
- MR: Chŏng Yunho

Stage name
- Hangul: 유노윤호
- Hanja: 瑜鹵允浩
- RR: Yuno Yunho
- MR: Yuno Yunho

Signature
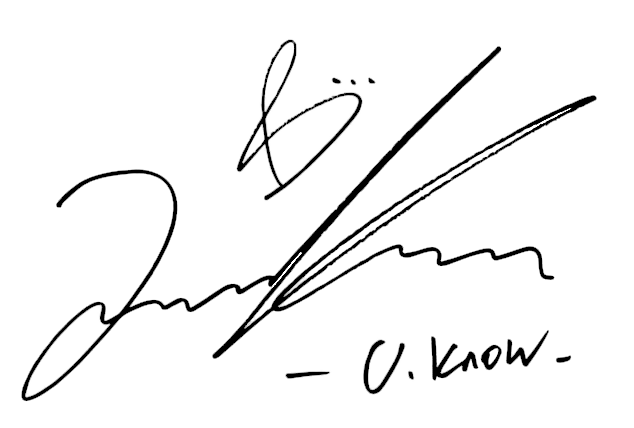

Jung Yunho (Korean: 정윤호; born February 6, 1986), better known by his stage name U-Know Yunho (유노윤호) or simply U-Know, is a South Korean singer-songwriter, actor, and a member of the pop duo TVXQ. Born and raised in Gwangju, South Korea, Yunho started his musical training under the talent agency SM Entertainment in 2001 and joined TVXQ in 2003 as the band's leader. Fluent in Korean and Japanese, Yunho has released chart-topping albums throughout Asia as a member of TVXQ. He has made occasional acting appearances in television dramas.

== Early life ==
Yunho was born and raised in Gwangju, South Korea. He has one younger sister. Several members of Yunho's family worked in the legal industry, and Yunho's own childhood dream was to be a prosecutor.

When he was in middle school, he and a few other friends formed the dance team A+, and they competed in various dance competitions around the country. After winning a prize at the 1st Annual SM Best Competition in 1999, Yunho signed with S.M. Entertainment and officially started his training in 2001.

His family, who suffered greatly from the 1997 Asian financial crisis, were initially against his decision to become a singer. To provide for himself while he trained in Seoul, Yunho took up various part-time jobs in the city, such as doing snow removal in the morning and working as a waiter at night. He spent most of his high school vacations in Seoul training and only returned to Gwangju for school. Sometime later, Yunho suffered a hormonal imbalance in his throat and underwent surgery, which affected his vocal cords. After losing his voice, Yunho considered giving up his training.

Throughout his years as a trainee, Yunho was put in four temporary groups—all of which later disbanded. In late 2001, at the age of fifteen, Yunho was featured as a rapper and backup dancer in Dana's debut single "Diamond", and briefly toured with her.

In 2002, Yunho was selected to be a backup dancer for Shinhwa and was chosen to be part of the project boy band Four Seasons, which consisted of fellow trainees Kim Jae-joong, Kim Hee-chul, and Kangin. The project group was dropped when Yunho and Jaejoong joined TVXQ in early 2003.

Yunho's stage name "U-Know", a nickname he has been using since high school, reflected Yunho's position as the leader, who was always trying to understand others.

== Music career ==
=== TVXQ ===
The final line-up of TVXQ consisted of Yunho, Max Changmin, Jaejoong, Park Yoo-chun, and Kim Jun-su. The group officially debuted on December 26, 2003, during a BoA and Britney Spears showcase. They performed their debut single "Hug", which became a hit in South Korea. TVXQ have been releasing number one albums in Korea since their second studio album Rising Sun (2005), which was also the album that gave the group their first Daesang (대상), or Grand Award, at the Mnet KM Music Festival. Their fourth Korean album Mirotic (2008) was the Album of the Year at the 2008 Mnet KM Music Festival and the 2008 Golden Disc Awards. The album features the group's most well-known and best-selling single, "Mirotic".

In 2005, TVXQ made their Japanese debut with the single "Stay with Me Tonight", debuting at number 37 on the Oricon Singles Chart. They grabbed their first number-one single in Japan with "Purple Line" (2008). Their fourth Japanese album The Secret Code spawned two platinum-selling singles "Dōshite Kimi o Suki ni Natte Shimattandarō?" and Share the World" (2009), with the latter being a theme song for the anime One Piece.

TVXQ was plunged into legal turmoil when members Jaejoong, Yoochun, and Junsu filed an injunction against their Korean agency in July 2009. This led to their much-publicized departure from the group in 2010. A year later, Yunho and Changmin returned as a duo, releasing albums in both Korean and Japanese. As a duo, TVXQ set sales records and concert attendance records in Japan, becoming the country's best-selling and highest-grossing foreign music act.

=== Solo career ===
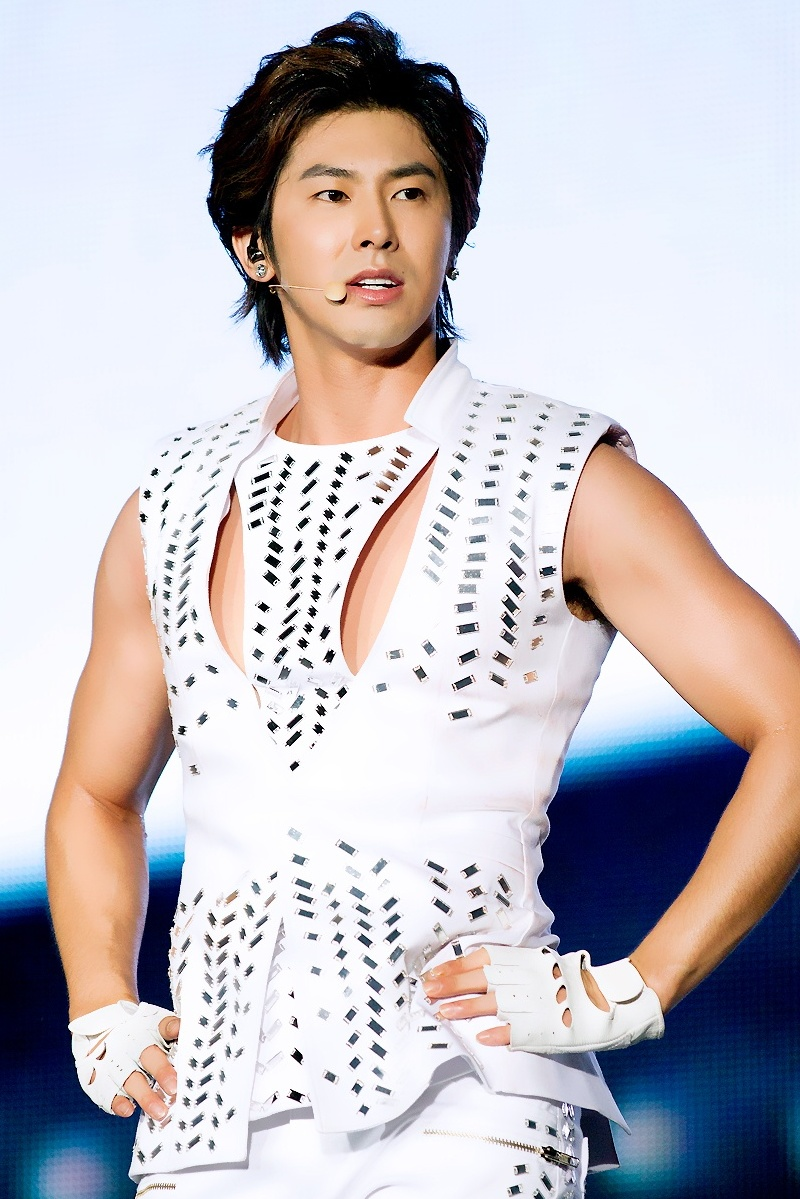
Yunho performing in 2012

On May 25, 2015, it was announced that Yunho would release his first Japanese solo extended play U Know Y. Consisting of seven tracks, the mini album includes five songs that were previously performed by Yunho during TVXQ's concerts and solo events in Japan. The new track "Burning Down" was selected to be the album's lead single. Bundled with a DVD that includes a music video and behind-the-scenes footage, U Know Y received a limited release, and was only made available for purchase to members of TVXQ's Japanese fanclub, Bigeast. The mini album was released on July 8, 2015.

On July 20, 2015, Yunho releases the music video "Champagne" with then SM Rookie member, Park Jisung, currently a member of NCT.

On May 3, 2019, Yunho announced plans to release his first solo Korean-language album. Yunho's debut extended play, True Colors, was announced on May 28 and was released on June 12 alongside its lead single "Follow".

On December 17, 2020, Yunho announced that he would make his comeback in January 2021. Yunho's second extended play, Noir, was released on January 18, 2021, alongside its lead single "Thank U".

On February 9, 2022, Yunho released his second Japanese extended play You Go Ahead.

On August 7, 2023, Yunho released his third Korean-language extended play Reality Show, alongside its lead single "Vuja De".

On November 5, 2025, Yunho released his first Korean-language studio album I-KNOW.

On July 22, 2026, Yunho released his first single album Time's Tickin', featuring a title track of the same name.

== Acting career ==
Yunho had brief acting cameos on the first few years of his career. He appeared in the MBC sitcom Nonstop 4, and participated in the television drama Vacation and movie Dating on Earth starring all of the members of TVXQ.

Yunho made his official acting debut in 2009, playing the male lead in romantic comedy series Heading to the Ground. However, the series was a commercial flop and sparked criticism from netizens for his lack of acting skills.

From September to December 2010, Yunho starred in his first musical, a remake of the South Korean television drama Goong. From November 2012 to January 2013, Yunho starred in his second musical Gwanghwamun Sonata, a story set in South Korea during the democratic movement in the 1980s.

In 2012, Yunho starred in melodrama King of Ambition, playing a wealthy heir with ice hockey skills. His performance earned him a People's Choice award at the 2013 Seoul International Drama Awards.

In 2014, Yunho starred in the historical action drama Diary of a Night Watchman, playing a swordsman. Yunho was widely praised for his acting, managing fierce action scenes and effectively portraying the delicate emotions of his character.

For his last project before enlistment, Yunho chose to star in the web series I Order You, playing a chef. The series premiered on Naver TVcast in July 2015.

In May 2017, Yunho was confirmed to star in Orion Cinema Network's upcoming romantic mystery drama, Meloholic.

In May 2023, Yunho starred in the mini series Race, playing the role of company CEO Seo Dong-hoon. The series premiered on Star (Disney+), Disney+ Hotstar in South-East Asia and Hulu in the US. It also marked Yunho's acting comeback after 6 years.

== Artistry ==
Yunho has been given the name "K-pop's dancing king" by critics. He was also the only Asian performer invited to Michael Jackson's tribute concert This Is It, and performed in the Korean leg. He trained in Los Angeles and Las Vegas with Genevieve Gleary, Morris Pleasure, and others who once worked closely with Jackson.

== Other ventures ==
=== Ambassadorship ===
In 2014, Yunho was named honorary ambassador of National Assembly Library.

=== Philanthropy ===
On March 7, 2022, Yunho donated 50 million won to the Community Chest of Korea for Fruit of Love to help the victims of the massive wildfire that started in Uljin, Gyeongbuk and has spread to Samcheok, Gangwon.

== Personal life ==
Besides his native Korean, Yunho is fluent in Japanese. He graduated from Myongji University in 2011. He has pursued a master's degree at Chungwoon University.

On March 12, 2021, Yunho violated COVID-19 restrictions when he visited a bar with friends in Gangnam after 10 pm. He posted a public apology on his Instagram. On September 2, 2021, Yunho was cleared of criminal charges and paid a small fine for his curfew violation.

=== Cyanoacrylate drink poisoning ===
While TVXQ was filming a variety show on October 14, 2006, Yunho was rushed to the hospital after drinking a beverage laced with super glue, given to him by an anti-fan. The female suspect, whose surname is Ko, was apprehended on October 16. She was a member of an anti-TVXQ website for over two years.

Yunho contacted the police and requested to not press charges against Ko in spite of the potentially severe consequences of what she did. Ko was the same age as Yunho's younger sister, and Yunho stated that the entire event "affected [him] more mentally than physically" while he was recovering from the shock. Circumstances were unclear as to how the culprit managed to enter the set of the variety show.

=== Military service ===
Yunho was inducted into the Republic of Korea Armed Forces on July 21, 2015. He received five weeks of basic training at Yangju, Gyeonggi Province, and was the leader of his squad. A completion ceremony for the recruits was held on August 27, and Yunho was awarded with the "Best Recruit" honor. Yunho officially joined the military band for the 26th Mechanized Infantry Division on August 31. He was honored as a Special Warrior on May 9, 2016. Yunho was honorably discharged from service on April 20, 2017.

== Discography ==
=== Studio albums ===
Title	Details	Peak chart positions		Sales
Title	Details	KOR	JPN	Sales
I-Know	Released: November 5, 2025; Label: SM Entertainment; Format: CD, digital download, streaming; Track listing: 1. "Set in Stone"; 2. "Body Language"; 3. "Stretch"; 4. "Spotlight2"; 5. "Waterfalls" (featuring Kai); 6. "Leader"; 7. "Premium" (featuring Minnie); 8. "Fever"; 9. "Let You Go"; 10. "26 Take-off" (이륙)	8	37	KOR: 137,757; JPN: 1,626

=== Extended plays ===
Title	Details	Peak chart positions		Sales
Title	Details	KOR	JPN	Sales
Korean
True Colors	Released: June 12, 2019; Label: SM Entertainment; Format: CD, digital download, streaming; Track listing: 1. "Follow"; 2. "Blue Jeans"; 3. "Swing" (feat. BoA); 4. "Hit Me Up" (불러) (feat. Giriboy); 5. "Why" (왜); 6. "Change the World"	1	5	KOR: 143,424
Noir	Released: January 18, 2021; Label: SM Entertainment; Format: CD, digital download, streaming; Track listing: 1. "Time Machine"; 2. "Thank U"; 3. "Eeny Meeny"; 4. "Loco (House Party)"; 5. "Need You Right Now"; 6. "La Rosa" (불면) (feat. Shin Ye-eun)	1	—	KOR: 178,643
Reality Show	Released: August 7, 2023; Label: SM Entertainment; Format: CD, digital download, streaming; Track listing: 1. "Wannabe"; 2. "Vuja-De"; 3. "Tarantino"; 4. "Relax"; 5. "Spotlight"; 6. "Curtain"	6	5	KOR: 136,365; JPN: 17,138
Japanese
U Know Y	Released: July 8, 2015 (limited); Label: Avex Trax; Format: CD+DVD; Track listing CD: 1. "Burning Down"; 2. "Tattoos & High Heels"; 3. "Bang!" (Japanese ver.); 4. "Tsunagareta Hune" (繋がれた舟) (Tethered Boat); 5. "T-Style"; 6. "Honey Funny Bunny" (Japanese ver.); 7. "Santa Revolution" (Japanese ver.); DVD: 1. "Burning Down" (Video clip); 2. Jacket Making Movie; 3. Off Shot Movie; 4. mini AL music introduction	—	—	—N/a
Kimi wa Saki e Iku (君は先へ行く)	Released: February 9, 2022; Label: Avex Trax; Format: CD+DVD; Track listing CD: 1. "Kimi wa Saki e Iku" (君は先へ行く) (You Go Ahead); 2. "Refill"; 3. "Naifu" (ナイフ) (Knife); 4. "Shake It Like This"; 5. "Easy to Know"; 6. "Sairen" (サイレン) (Siren)	—	1	JPN: 41,316
"—" denotes releases that did not chart or were not released in that region.

=== Single albums ===
Title	Details	Peak chart positions	Sales
Title	Details	KOR	Sales
Time's Tickin'	Released: July 20, 2026; Label: SM Entertainment; Format: CD, digital download, streaming	5	KOR: 65,006

=== Singles ===
Title	Year	Peak chart positions	Album
Title	Year	KOR	Album
Korean
"Drop"	2017	—	Non-album single
"Follow"	2019	142	True Colors
"Thank U"	2021	131	Noir
"Eeny Meeny"	2021	—	Non-album single
"Vuja De"	2023	—	Reality Show
"Body Language"	2025	—	I-Know
"Stretch"	2025	—	I-Know
"Time's Tickin'"	2026	—	Time's Tickin'
Japanese
"Kimi wa Saki e Iku (君は先へ行く)"	2022	—	Kimi wa Saki e Iku
"Thank U" (Japanese ver)	2023	—	Non-album single

=== Songwriting credits ===
Title	Year	Artist(s)	Album	Credits
"넌 언제나 (You Always)"	2004	TVXQ	Tri-Angle	Co-writer (rap)
"Love After Love"	2005	TVXQ	Rising Sun	Co-writer (rap)
"태양은 가득히 (Red Sun)"	2006	SM Town	2006 Summer SMTown	Co-writer (rap)
"Sky"	2006	Tohoshinki	Five in the Black	Co-writer (rap)
"Snow Dream"	2006	SM Town	2006 Winter SMTown – Snow Dream	Co-writer (rap)
"Summer Dream"	2007	Tohoshinki	T	Co-writer (rap)
"Spokesman"	2007	Yunho featuring Donghae	The 2nd Asia Tour Concert "O"	Co-writer (music, lyrics)
"Wrong Number"	2008	TVXQ	Mirotic	Co-writer (rap)
"사랑 안녕 사랑 (Love Bye Love)"	2008	TVXQ	Mirotic	Co-writer (rap)
"이별…넌 쉽니 (Heartquake)"	2009	Super Junior featuring U-Know Yunho and Micky Yoochun	Sorry, Sorry	Co-writer (rap)
"Checkmate"	2009	Yunho	—N/a	Co-writer (music, lyrics)
"Santa Revolution"	2013	Yunho	U KNOW Y	Co-writer, co-producer
"뒷모습 (Steppin')"	2014	TVXQ	Tense	Co-writer (rap)
"11월...그리고 (November With Love)"	2014	Yunho	Spellbound	Co-writer (music, lyrics)
"Shout Out!"	2014	Yunho	—N/a	Co-writer (music, lyrics)
"Bang!"	2014	Yunho	U KNOW Y	Co-writer (music, lyrics)

=== Soundtrack appearances ===
List of soundtrack appearances, with chart positions, showing year released, sales and album name
Title	Year	Peak chart positions			Sales	Album
Title	Year	KOR	KOR Songs (Note: Includes the Billboard K-pop Hot 100 (defunct as of 2022), and South Korea Songs (part of Billboard's Hits of the World (2022 onwards).)	US World	Sales	Album
"Waterfall"	2023	—	—	—		Race OST
"—" denotes releases that did not chart or were not released in that region.

== Filmography ==
=== Film ===
Film	Year	Role	Notes/Ref.
Dating on Earth	2009	Yunho	Direct-to-video
Haru: An Unforgettable Day in Korea	2010	Stunt actor	Television film for Korean Tourism
Chorus City	2010	Yunho	Short film for Shanghai Expo
I AM.	2012	Himself	Documentary film
Make Your Move	2013	U-Know	Cameo
Ode to My Father	2014	Nam Jin	Cameo
SMTOWN The Stage	2015	Himself	Documentary film
Tokyo Burst: Crime City	2026		Japanese–Korean film

=== Television series ===
Title	Year	Role	Notes	Ref.
Banjun Drama	2005–06	Various roles	Main role	
Nonstop 4	2006	Yunho	Guest role (Episodes 62, 64)	
Vacation	2006	Himself	Episode: "Cassiopeia"	
Heading to the Ground	2009	Cha Bong-Goon	Main role	
Poseidon	2011	Kang Eun-chul	Guest role	
Living Among the Rich	2011	Himself	Cameo (Episode 1)	
Welcome to the Show	2011	Himself	Cameo (Episode 1)	
King of Ambition	2013	Baek Do-hoon	Main role	
Saki	2013	Cafe customer	Cameo (Episode 11)	
Diary of a Night Watchman	2014	Kang Moo-seok	Main role	
I Order You	2015	Yeo Gook-dae	Main role	
Meloholic	2017	Yoo Eun-ho	Main role	
Go Back	2017	Salesman	Cameo (Episode 2)	
Tensai Bakabon 3	2018	Hotel porter	Cameo	
Race	2023	Seo Dong-hoon	Main role	
Low Life	2025	Jang Beol-gu		

=== Variety show ===
Title	Year	Roles	Notes	Ref.
Explorers of the Human Body	2007	Cast member	2 episodes	
Kim Yuna's Kiss & Cry	2011	Contestant		
Dunia: Into a New World	2018	Cast member		
Invention King	2020	Host & Inventor		
The Representative	2023–present	Host		

=== Other shows ===
Title	Year	Notes	Ref.
72 Hours of TVXQ	2018	Himself	
Analog Trip	2019	Himself	
2020 KBS Song Festival	2020	Co-host	
Check This Out	2021	Himself	
Nae Muttaero	2025	Himself / panelist	

== Musical theatre ==
Year	Title	Role	Notes
2010	Goong: Musical	Crown Prince Lee Shin	Theatre Yong (September 8 – October 24, 2010)
2012–13	Gwanghwamun Sonata (Japan)	Sang-hoon	Also known as Gwanghwamun Love Song; Osaka, Shin Kabukiza Theatre (November 20 – 21, 2012); Tokyo, Meijiza Theater (January 26, 2013)

== Accolades ==
=== Awards and nominations ===
Name of the award ceremony, year presented, award category, recipient of the award and the result of the nomination
Award	Year	Category	Recipient	Result	Ref.
Baeksang Arts Awards	2010	Most Popular Actor	Heading to the Ground	Nominated	
Baeksang Arts Awards	2013	Most Popular Actor	King of Ambition	Nominated	
Barbie & Ken Awards	2012	Korean Ken Award	Jung Yunho	Won	
Brand Customer Loyalty Awards	2021	Best Male Solo Artist	Jung Yunho	Nominated	
MBC Drama Awards	2014	Excellence Award, Actor in a Special Project Drama	Diary of a Night Watchman	Nominated	
Director's Cut Awards	2026	Best New Actor (Series)	Low Life	Won	
Seoul International Drama Awards	2013	Most Popular Actor – South Korea	Jung Yunho	Won	

=== State and cultural honors ===
Name of country or organization, name of award ceremony, year given and name of honor
Country or organization	Ceremony	Year	Honor	Ref.
South Korea	National Day of Finance – Savings Day	2020	Presidential Commendation	
