= Kang Yun-seong (director) =

South Korean filmmaker (born 1971)

- 강윤성
- Born: September 6, 1971 (age 55); South Korea
- Education: Kyung Hee University; American Academy of Arts
- Occupations: Director; Scriptwriter
- Years active: 1996–present

Korean name
- Hangul: 강윤성
- RR: Gang Yunseong
- MR: Kang Yunsŏng

Kang Yun-seong (Korean: 강윤성; born September 6, 1971) is a South Korean film director and scriptwriter. His first feature-length directorial film, The Outlaws (2017), starring Ma Dong-seok and Yoon Kye-sang, received rave reviews. Kang is also known for directing the Disney+ television series Big Bet (2022–2023) and Low Life (2025).

== Early years and education ==
When Kang was young, he developed a fondness for movies because his mother had a strong passion for them. They would often watch Weekend Movies together. As a high school senior, Kang's interest in filmmaking grew when he saw actor Yoon Seok-hwa on a TV talk show, fueling his dream of becoming a director. Despite majoring in physics at Kyung Hee University, Kang found himself more engrossed in film club activities than his studies. It was during a vacation after his military enlistment that he watched Quentin Tarantino's film Reservoir Dogs which solidified his decision to pursue a career in film directing.

After completing his military service, Kang made his first short film called Charlie Brown in 1996. Shot on 16mm film and edited using the Premier video editing program, the film was invited and screened at a university short film festival. Drawing from his filmmaking experience, Kang wrote a book titled "Computer Image Work." Using his work during this period as a portfolio, he decided to further his studies at the American Academy of Arts in San Francisco, after graduating from college.

During his time at the American Academy of Arts, Kang directed a short thriller called "Negative Image," which showcased a story of a man stalking a woman. The film was screened at the Indie Forum and the Busan International Short Film Festival in Korea. Following this, Kang worked on his first feature-length screenplay, "Foucault's Short Film," but unfortunately, the project failed to secure investment.

== Career ==
Kang then returned to Korea and attempted to develop his novel, "Moebius," but faced another setback when his investment company went bankrupt. These failures led Kang to temporarily step away from filmmaking and start his own production company, focusing on producing music videos and other visual works.

In 2003, Kang made a comeback to the film industry by joining the directing department in director Kim Seong-su's film Please Teach Me English. However, he faced yet another downturn and had to take on other jobs to support himself. In 2006, he directed the documentary "Shin Jung-hyun's Last Concert," which revolved around retired singer Shin Jung-hyun. The film was invited to the 3rd Jecheon International Film Festival.

Through a mutual acquaintance, Kang Yun-seong established a close relationship with actor Ma Dong-seok, who had just finished working on Army of Heaven. In 2012, the two collaborated on the feature film The Outlaws, which was based on real events. The Outlaws was released in 2017 and received tremendous success. By December 1, the film had garnered 6.87 million admissions and grossed US$51.8 million, making it the 3rd highest-grossing domestic film of the year in South Korea and the third best-selling R-rated Korean film of all time.

Kang then ventured to OTT dramas with series Big Bet. It is highly anticipated because it marks Choi Min-shik first drama series appearance in 26 years since Love and Separation in 1997. The series was released on Disney+ as an original series with two seasons comprising eight episodes each. First season was released on December 21, 2022. Second season was released in February 2023. Seventy percent of the filming was conducted in the Philippines.

== Filmography ==
=== Filmmaking credits ===
==== Feature film ====
Year	Title		Credited as			Ref.
Year	English	Korean	Director	Writer	Creator	Ref.
2007	Shin Joong-hyeon's Last Concert	신중현의 라스트 콘서트	Yes	No	No	
2017	The Outlaws	범죄도시	Yes	Yes	No	
2019	Long Live The King	롱 리브 더 킹: 목포 영웅	Yes	Adaptation	No	
2022	The Roundup	범죄도시 2	No	No	Yes	
2022	Men of Plastic	압꾸정	No	Adaptation	No	
2023	The Roundup: No Way Out	범죄도시 3	No	No	Yes	
2024	The Roundup: Punishment	범죄도시 4	No	No	Yes	
TBA	The Roundup 5	범죄도시 5	TBD	TBD	Yes	

==== Short film ====
Year	Title		Credited as			Ref.
Year	English	Korean	Director	Writer	Producer	Ref.
1998	Negative Image	네가티브 이미지	Yes	Yes	Yes	
2019	100X100		Yes	Yes	No	
2023	Hongkong, within Me	내 안에 홍콩이 있다	Yes	Yes	Yes	

==== Television series ====
Year	Title		Credited as		Ref.
Year	English	Korean	Director	Writer	Ref.
2022	Big Bet	카지노	Yes	Yes	
2025	Low Life	파인: 촌뜨기들	Yes	Yes	

=== Acting roles ===
Year	Title		Role	Ref.
Year	English	Korean	Role	Ref.
2002	Baby Alone	유아독존	Police	
2003	Please Teach Me English	영어완전정복	Bar Host	
2017	The Night View of the Ocean in Yeosu	여수 밤바다	Ji-seok's friend	
2020	Land of Holy Grace	성혜의 나라	Interviewer	
2020	Double Patty	더블패티	Instructor	

== Accolades ==
=== Awards and nominations ===
Name of the award ceremony, year presented, category, nominee(s) of the award, and the result of the nomination
Award ceremony	Year	Category	Nominee / Work	Result	Ref.
37th Korean Association of Film Critics Awards	2017	Top 10 Films	The Outlaws	Won	
37th Korean Association of Film Critics Awards	2017	Best New Director	The Outlaws	Won	
38th Blue Dragon Film Awards	2017	Best New Director	The Outlaws	Nominated	
38th Blue Dragon Film Awards	2017	Best Technical Achievement-Stunts	The Outlaws	Nominated	
38th Blue Dragon Film Awards	2017	Best Film Editing	The Outlaws	Nominated	
54th Baeksang Arts Awards	2018	Best New Director	The Outlaws	Won	
54th Baeksang Arts Awards	2018	Best Screenplay	The Outlaws	Nominated	
23rd Chunsa Film Art Awards	2017	Best Screenplay	The Outlaws	Nominated	
23rd Chunsa Film Art Awards	2017	Best New Director	The Outlaws	Won	
27th Buil Film Awards	2017	Best New Director	The Outlaws	Nominated	
55th Grand Bell Awards	2017	Best New Director	The Outlaws	Nominated	
55th Grand Bell Awards	2017	Best Planning	The Outlaws	Nominated	
18th Director's Cut Awards	2017	Best New Director	The Outlaws	Won	
Blue Dragon Series Awards	2023	Best Drama	Big Bet	Won	
Director's Cut Awards	2023	Best Director in Television	Big Bet	Nominated (Note: Shared with Nam Ki-hoon)	
Seoul International Drama Awards	2023	Golden Bird Prize for Program	Big Bet	Won	

=== State honors ===
Name of country, year given, and name of honor
Country	Award Ceremony	Year	Honor	Ref.
South Korea	Korean Content Awards (Note: Honors are given at the Korean Content Awards (대한민국 콘텐츠 대상) arranged by the Korea Creative Content Agency and hosted by the Ministry of Culture, Sports and Tourism. The 2022 Korea Content Awards Ceremony, which started in 2009 and celebrated its 14th this year, aims to inspire pride in the content industry and develop the Korean cultural content industry by discovering and awarding contributors and excellent content that have contributed to the development of the content industry in 2022. It is a place to promote. The winners (works) of honor, which are recommended through the website of the Korea Creative Content Agency (www.kocca.kr) and announced through careful examination by experts and three-step verification, play a leading role in shining the Korean content industry in the world.)	2021	Prime Minister's Commendation; For Contribution to the development of the broadcasting and video industry For Entertainment Co., Ltd. (CEO) - Kang Yun-seong	

=== Listicle ===
Name of publisher, year listed, name of listicle, and placement
Publisher	Year	List	Placement	Ref.
Cine21	2022	Series Director of the Year	Won	
