= Kim Min-gwi =

South Korean actor

- Born: Kim Min-gwi; 30 October 1994 (age 31); South Korea
- Other names: Kim Min-gi, Kim Min-gee
- Occupations: Actor; model
- Years active: 2017–present
- Agent: Big Picture Entertainment
- Known for: L.U.C.A.: The Beginning; Narco-Saints; Nevertheless

Kim Min-gwi is a South Korean actor and model. He is known best known for his roles in dramas such as L.U.C.A.: The Beginning, She Would Never Know, Narco-Saints and Nevertheless.

== Career ==
He joined Big Picture Entertainment and made his debut as a model in 2017 and appeared in a number of modeling show: Seoul Fashion Week Dohn Hann, Sewing Boundaries, Discovery, Ordinary People, Greedilous and Anyoung, Holynumber7, Solidhomm. He also appeared in magazines GQ, Dyed and Cosmopolitan along with that he also appeared in music videos of Senozzi and WELL. He also did modeling for clothing brands such as Musinsa, Songjio Homme, and Wonder Place and he also appeared in commercials such as NH Investment & Securities, Hyundai Motor Company, and Naver Music. He made his acting debut in 2021, he appeared in She Would Never Know as a model and later he appeared in L.U.C.A.: The Beginning as Kim Tae-oh and Nevertheless as Nam Kyu-hyun. He also starred in movie Whispering Corridors 6: The Humming.

== Personal life ==
On May 31, 2021, it was revealed that Kim Min-gwi had tested positive for COVID-19. He has gone into self-quarantine, halting all activities after coming in close contact with someone who had COVID-19 and recently tested positive for the virus.

== Filmography ==
=== Television series ===
Year	Title	Role	Ref.
2021	She Would Never Know	Model	
2021	L.U.C.A.: The Beginning	Kim Tae-oh	
2021	Kingdom: Ashin of the North	Soldier	
2021	Nevertheless	Nam Kyu-hyun	
2022	Narco-Saints	Lee Sang-jun	
2025	The Nice Guy	Im Bok-cheon	

=== Film ===
Year	Title	Role	Ref.
2021	Whispering Corridors 6: The Humming	Pajeowi soldier	
2023	Green Night	Dong	

=== Music video appearances ===
Year	Title	Artist
2017	"Seonozzi"	Way
2018	"Well"	6O'clock

== Awards and nominations ==
Name of the award ceremony, year presented, category, nominee of the award, and the result of the nomination
Award ceremony	Year	Category	Nominee / Work	Result	Ref.
Director's Cut Awards	2023	Best New Actor in Television	Narco-Saints	Won	
