= Ahn Gooc-jin =

South Korean filmmaker (born 1980)

- Born: 1980 (age 45–46); Seoul, South Korea
- Education: Kyung Hee University – Theater & Film; Korean Academy of Film Arts – Directing
- Occupations: Film director, screenwriter

Korean name
- Hangul: 안국진
- RR: An Gukjin
- MR: An Kukchin

Ahn Gooc-jin (born 1980), is a South Korean film director and screenwriter. Ahn's directorial feature debut Alice in Earnestland (2015) has won various awards, including New Talent Award at the 39th Hong Kong Asian Film Festival, Best Screenplay at the 52nd Baeksang Arts Awards and Best Independent Film Director at the 16th Director's Cut Awards.

== Career ==
Ahn was born in 1980.

Ahn had his TV debut in 2018 through the Drama Stage episode All About My Rival in Love.

== Filmography ==
- Stop by My House (short film, 2008) – director, screenwriter, editor
- A Little Pond (2009) – production assistant
- Poetry (2010) – production assistant
- Double Clutch (short film, 2012) – director, screenwriter, editor
- The Weight (2012) – 1st assistant director
- Alice in Earnestland (2015) – director, screenwriter, editor
- Drama Stage: All About My Rival in Love (2018) – director
- SF8 ("Baby It’s Over Outside" episode) (2020) – director
- Troll Factory (2024) – director, screenwriter

== Awards ==
- 2015 39th Hong Kong Asian Film Festival: New Talent Award (Alice in Earnestland)
- 2016 52nd Baeksang Arts Awards: Best Screenplay (Film) (Alice in Earnestland)
- 2016 16th Director's Cut Awards: Best Independent Film Director (Alice in Earnestland)
