= Noir (EP) =

2021 U-Know EP

- Digital cover

EP by U-Know Yunho
- Released: January 18, 2021
- Recorded: 2020
- Studio: SM Studios (Seoul)
- Genres: Pop; dance; R&B; electropop
- Length: 15:58 (digital version); 18:37 (CD version)
- Language: Korean
- Labels: SM; Dreamus
- Producer: Lee Soo-man (exec.)

U-Know Yunho chronology
True Colors (2019)	Noir (2021)	Kimi wa Saki e Iku (2022)

Singles from Noir
- 1. "Thank U" Released: January 18, 2021; 2. "Eeny Meeny" Released: January 25, 2021

Noir is the second Korean extended play by South Korean singer U-Know Yunho, a member of the pop duo TVXQ. It was released on January 18, 2021 by SM Entertainment. Produced by Lee Soo-man, the EP was recorded in Seoul, South Korea. Musically, the EP is primarily a dance pop album with R&B and electropop influences. South Korean actress Shin Ye-eun featured her vocals in the EP's last track, "La Rosa."

The EP was a commercial success. In South Korea, it debuted at number one on the Circle Album Chart (then known as the Gaon Albums Chart), selling over 86,000 copies on the first day. It also topped iTunes music charts in eighteen countries across the world on the first day of release. Noir sold over 100,000 units after the first week in South Korea, and sold over 200,000 units by the end of the year, putting it as Yunho's best-selling EP to-date.

== Background and release ==
In December 2020, Yunho's agency SM Entertainment announced that he would be coming back with his second solo release. The EP's title, Noir, was confirmed on January 4, 2021, and actress Shin Ye-eun's participation on the album was confirmed on January 5. From January 5 through 7, SM Entertainment released a series of teaser images featuring Yunho in "cinematic" backdrops, teasing the album's theme. On January 7, Yunho shared on his official Instagram a release schedule for the album, and introduced the album's cinema-inspired theme. Actor Hwang Jung-min was confirmed to be making an appearance in the music video for the EP's lead single, "Thank U."

Described as a "concept album", Noir draws inspiration from various film genres, including comedy, romance, sci-fi, and action. Music videos were filmed for each track in the album, telling different stories. In "Thank U," Yunho starred alongside Hwang and Lee Jung-hyun as rivaling gang members. The music video for the album's second promotional single "Eeny Meeny" starred Red Velvet member Seulgi, and in "La Rosa," Yunho and Shin Ye-eun played as love interests.

On January 8, Yunho dropped the album's first music video teaser and film poster for "Need You Right Now." On January 9, the "Loco (House Party)" set was revealed, and on January 11, "La Rosa" featuring Shin was released. On January 13, Yunho released the "futuristic" music video for "Time Machine," written by Thomas Troelsen. On January 15, the teaser images and character trailers for the lead single "Thank U" was dropped, followed by the prologue clip released on January 16. The full music video premiered on January 18, the day of the album's release.

== Music and themes ==
Described as a "concept album" by the South China Morning Post, Noir is composed of six tracks, with each song representing a different genre of cinema. Each song from the album had its own reimagined movie poster and short film.

"Time Machine" is the first track from Noir. Inspired by sci-fi films, the song is a follow-up to Yunho's previous lead single "Follow" from the EP True Colors (2019), and is described as a "hyperpop" song that time-travels into an older world, which is the main universe for the next track, "Thank U." The song is written by Thomas Troelsen, who also co-wrote "Follow." The music video is directed by Seo Dong-hyuk.

The second track and lead single "Thank U" is described as pop dance song with a "sense of darkness and weightiness," with a twist. It features a repetitive hook with conversational rap, with Yunho describing the song as the "epitome of [his] style." The lyrics talk about the determination of overcoming negativity, and thanking naysayers for carving a new path for him to walk on. The music video of "Thank U," directed by Kim Hyun-soo, stars Yunho as a gang member who survives an attempted murder by rivaling mafia boss Hwang Jung-min, and his right-hand man Lee Jung-hyun. Recovering from his wounds, he trains to exact revenge on those who betrayed him. Scenes and action sequences from the music video were influenced by western and eastern films such as An Actor's Revenge (1963), Patriotism (1966), Mishima: A Life in Four Chapters (1985), Kill Bill: Volume 1 (2003), Oldboy (2003), A Bittersweet Life (2005) and motifs inspired by Hong Kong film director Wong Kar-wai. The music video was positively received by general music critics. The Japanese version of "Thank U" was released on June 3, 2023 and was part of the set list for TVXQ's Classyc Tour in Japan.

The third track "Eeny Meeny" was released as a separate digital single on January 25, 2021. Described as a monodrama romantic comedy piece, the music video of "Eeny Meeny" also features a performance by Red Velvet member Seulgi. The song is a dance track with funky beats. The music video is directed by Shin Heewon.

The fourth track "Loco (House Party)" is the album's comedy piece. Also co-written by Troelsen, "Loco" is described a "funky" dance pop song with disco house beats. The music video is directed by Rim Haansol.

The fifth track "Need You Right Now" is described as a monodrama that conveys the message of carpe diem. The music video is directed by Jason Kim.

The final track "La Rosa" features South Korean actress Shin Ye-eun, who is also featured in the music video. Directed by Yua, the video stars Yunho and Shin as two lovers who think about each other through the night.

== Reception ==
Noir was a commercial success. On the first day of release, the digital release topped the iTunes Stores of eighteen countries and territories, and China's QQ Music and KuGou Music. The physical release debuted at number one on South Korea's Hanteo's daily Physical Album Chart, selling over 87,000 copies on the first day. Noir went on to debut at number one on the Circle Album Chart in South Korea, with over 155,000 units sold on the first week. It was the world's best-selling album that week per the United World Chart, in the report released on February 8, 2021.

In Japan, Noir debuted at number ten on the Oricon Albums Chart. Noir ultimately sold over 180,000 units in South Korea by the end of 2021.

== Track listing ==
Noir track listing
No.	Title	Lyrics	Music	Arrangement	Length
1.	"Time Machine"	Lee Hye-yoom; Kim Moon-sook	Thomas Troelsen	Troelsen	3:10
2.	"Thank U"	Yoo Young-jin	Yoo; Jake Torrey; Cook Classics; Alex Schwartz; Joe Khajadourian; Michael Pollack	Yoo; The Futuristics	3:10
3.	"Eenie Meenie"	Moon Yeo-reum; Myeong Hye-in	David Wilson; Tia Scola; Wyatt Sanders; Larus Arnarson; Brooke Williams	Dwilly; Leo	2:39
4.	"Loco (House Party)"	Moon Hye-eun	Troelsen; Sam Martin; Sean Foreman; Andreas Sculler; Bonnie McKee	Troelsen; Axident	3:10
5.	"Need You Right Now"	Park Sung-hee	Torrey; Noah Conrad; Felix Sandman; Parker James	Torrey; Conrad	3:10
6.	"불면 (不眠; La Rosa)" (featuring Shin Ye-eun)	Hwang Ji-won; Jang Han-bit	Mateo Camargo; Alessandro Calemme; Mats Koray Genc; Chris Young; Ronny Svendsen; Nermin Harambasic; Anne Judith Wik; Jakob Mihoubi; Rudi Daouk; Lars Pedersen	Camargo; Calemme; Genc; Young; Svendsen; Harambasic	3:16
Total length:					18:37

== Credits ==
Credits adapted from the EP's liner notes.

Studio

- Doobdoob Studio – recording (track 1, 3–4, 6), digital editing (track 3)
- SM Booming System – recording, digital editing, engineered for mix, mixing (track 2)
- SM Yellow Tail Studio – recording (track 5), engineered for mix (track 1)
- SM LVYIN Studio – recording (track 6), engineered for mix (track 4), mixing (track 4)
- SM Starlight Studio – digital editing (track 1, 4–6)
- SM SSAM Studio – digital editing (track 4), engineered for mix (track 3, 5–6)
- SM Big Shot Studio – mixing (track 1, 6)
- SM Blue Cup Studio – mixing (track 3)
- SM Concert Hall Studio – mixing (track 5)
- 821 Sound – mastering (track 1, 3, 5–6)
- Sonic Korea – mastering (track 2, 4)

Personnel

- SM Entertainment – executive producer
- Lee Soo-man – producer
- Lee Sung-soo – production director, executive supervisor
- Tak Young-jun – executive supervisor
- Chae Jung-hee – A&R director
- U-Know – vocals (all tracks)
- Shin Ye-eun – vocals (track 6)
- Lee Hye-yoom – lyrics (track 1)
- Kim Moon-sook – lyrics (track 1)
- Thomas Troelsen – producer, composition, arrangement (track 1, 4), background vocals (track 1)
- Jake Torrey – producer, arrangement (track 5), composition (track 2, 5)
- Cook Classics – composition (track 2)
- Alex Schwartz (The Futuristics) – producer, composition, arrangement (track 2)
- Joe Khajadourian (The Futuristics) – producer, composition, arrangement (track 2)
- Michael Pollack – composition (track 2)
- Yoo Young-jin – producer, lyrics, composition, arrangement, vocal directing, background vocals, recording, digital editing, engineered for mix, mixing (track 2), music and sound supervisor (all tracks)
- Moon Yeo-reum – lyrics (track 3)
- Myeong Hye-in – lyrics (track 3)
- David "Dwilly" Wilson – producer, composition, arrangement, background vocals (track 3)
- Tia Scola – composition (track 3)
- Wyatt Sanders – composition, background vocals (track 3)
- Larus "Leo" Arnarson – producer, composition, arrangement (track 3)
- Brooke Williams – composition (track 3)
- Moon Hye-eun – lyrics (track 4)
- Sam Martin – composition (track 4)
- Sean Foreman – composition (track 4)
- Andreas Sculler a.k.a. Axident – producer, composition, arrangement (track 4)
- Bonnie McKee – composition (track 4)
- Park Sung-hee – lyrics (track 5)
- Noah Conrad – producer, composition, arrangement (track 5)
- Felix Sandman – composition (track 5)
- Parker James – composition (track 5)
- Hwang Ji-won – lyrics (track 6)
- Jang Han-bit – lyrics (track 6)
- Mateo Camargo – composition, arrangement (track 6)
- Alessandro Calemme – composition, arrangement (track 6)
- Mats Koray Genc a.k.a. JFMee – producer, composition, arrangement (track 6)
- Chris Young – composition, arrangement (track 6)
- Ronny Svendsen – producer, composition, arrangement (track 6)
- Nermin Harambasic – producer, composition, arrangement (track 6)
- Anne Judith Wik – composition (track 6)
- Jakob Mihoubi – composition, background vocals (track 6)
- Rudi Daouk – composition, background vocals (track 6)
- Lars Pedersen a.k.a. Chief1 – composition (track 6)
- Junny – vocal directing, background vocals (track 1, 3–4)
- Hwang Sung-je (ButterFly) – vocal directing, background vocals, digital editing (track 5)
- Seo Mi-rae (ButterFly) – vocal directing, digital editing (track 5)
- Ju Chan-yang (Iconic Sounds) – vocal directing, background vocals (track 6)
- Dala – background vocals (track 4)
- Tak – additional sound effects (track 1)
- Yoo Woong-ryeol – guitar (track 6)
- Eugene Kwon – recording (track 1, 3–4, 6), digital editing (track 3)
- Noh Min-ji – recording (track 5), engineered for mix (track 1)
- Lee Ji-hong – recording (track 6), engineered for mix (track 4), mixing (track 4)
- Jeong Yoo-ra – digital editing (track 1, 4–6)
- Kang Eun-ji – digital editing (track 4), engineered for mix (track 3, 5–6)
- Lee Min-kyu – mixing (track 1, 6)
- Jung Eui-seok – mixing (track 3)
- Nam Koong-jin – mixing (track 5)
- Kwon Nam-woo – mastering (track 1, 3, 5–6)
- Jeon Hoon – mastering (track 2, 4)
- Shin Soo-min – mastering assistant (track 2, 4)

== Charts ==
=== Weekly charts ===
Weekly chart performance for Noir
Chart (2021)	Peak position
Japanese Albums (Oricon)	10
South Korean Albums (Circle)	1

=== Monthly charts ===
Monthly chart performance for Noir
Chart (2021)	Position
South Korean Albums (Circle)	4

=== Yearly charts ===
Yearly chart performance for Noir
Chart (2021)	Position
South Korean Albums (Circle)	63
