= I Order You =

- Promotional poster
- Also known as: I Order for You
- Genre: Romance, Comedy
- Based on: I Order You by Fla-da
- Written by: Lee Moon-hwi; Oh Bo-hyun
- Directed by: Ahn Gil-ho
- Starring: Jung Yun-ho; Kim Ga-eun
- Country of origin: South Korea
- Original language: Korean
- No. of episodes: 16

Production
- Executive producer: Kim Yong-jin
- Production location: Korea
- Running time: Monday to Thursday 16:40
- Production company: SBS Plus

Original release
- Network: SBS Plus; Naver TV Cast
- Release: 6 July – 30 July 2015

I Order You (Korean: 당신을 주문합니다; RR: Dangsineul jumunhamnida), based on the novel series with the same name by Fla-da, is a 2015 South Korean drama series starring Jung Yun-ho and Kim Ga-eun.

== Plot ==
Yeo Gook-dae (Jung Yun-ho) is a talented chef who had a bad experience in a relationship in the past. He was heartbroken since his bride had left him on the day of their marriage. Then, he meets Park Song-ah (Kim Ga-eun) and they fall in love with each other. But eventually their meeting makes them deal with the secrets of the past.

== Cast ==
=== Main cast ===
- Jung Yun-ho as Yeo Gook-dae
- Kim Ga-eun as Park Song-ah

=== Supporting cast ===
- Jang Seung-jo as Kevin
- Goo Jae-yee as Ah Da-hwa
- Baek Jong-won as Han Bi-ryong
- Cho Yoon-woo as Nam Soo-ri
- Yoon Hong-bin as Park Song-joo
- Jung Yi-rang as Oh Duk-hee
- Noh Young-kook as President Director of Inde Communication
- Park Joon-geum as Gook-dae's mother
- Choi Ji-yun as Song-ah's mother
