= True Colors (EP) =

2019 U-Know EP

- Digital cover

EP by U-Know Yunho
- Released: June 12, 2019
- Recorded: 2019
- Studio: SM Studios (Seoul)
- Genres: Pop; dance; electropop
- Length: 20:51
- Language: Korean
- Labels: SM; Dreamus
- Producer: Lee Soo-man (exec.)

U-Know Yunho chronology
U Know Y (2015)	True Colors (2019)	Noir (2021)

Singles from True Colors
- 1. "Follow" Released: June 12, 2019

True Colors is the debut extended play by South Korean singer U-Know Yunho, a member of the pop duo TVXQ. It was released on June 12, 2019 by SM Entertainment. Produced by Lee Soo-man, the EP was recorded in Seoul, South Korea. Musically, the EP is primarily a dance pop album with R&B and electropop influences. BoA and Giriboy are also featured in the album.

The EP was a commercial success. In South Korea, it debuted at number one on the Circle Chart (then known as the Gaon Albums Chart), selling over 57,000 copies on the first day. It also topped iTunes music charts in at least fifteen countries across the world on the first day of release. True Colors sold over 100,000 units after the first week in South Korea, making Yunho the third solo male artist to do so since the chart's inception in 2010. In Japan, True Colors topped the Oricon Digital Charts with over 4,000 downloads on the first week, and the physical version debuted at number five on the Oricon Albums Chart.

== Background and release ==
After celebrating TVXQ's fifteenth anniversary debut with the EP New Chapter #2: The Truth of Love, the duo embarked on their encore concert tour, the Circle #with Tour in early 2019. On May 3, 2019, SM Entertainment announced that Yunho would be releasing his first solo album in June. The EP's lead single "Follow" is written by Yoo Young-jin, a frequent contributor to TVXQ's music catalog. From June 3 through 8, Yunho released teaser images and tracklist highlights from the EP on the platform X, formerly known as Twitter. A special clip of the b-side "Hit Me Up" featuring Giriboy was dropped on June 7. The album cover for True Colors was revealed on June 9, and the first music video for "Follow" was released on June 10, followed by a second teaser on June 11. A showcase attended by press and selected fans was held on June 12, ahead of the EP's release. There, Yunho performed three tracks from the EP, including "Follow". The full music video of "Follow" was dropped at 6PM KST.

== Composition ==
True Colors features six tracks, with each track representing a different color. "Swing", which features BoA, is associated with the color red, and has lyrics that emphasize the romantic tension between a woman and a man. "Change the World", the EP's final track, is compared to the color white for the positive energy of its lyrics. Each song also features different vocal tones by Yunho, conveying the different colors in life. The song's lead single "Follow" is written by Yoo and Thomas Troelsen, the writers of TVXQ's hit single "Mirotic" (2008). The song is described as a "dark" dance pop track with sprinkles of "humor" throughout the choreography.

== Reception ==
True Colors was a commercial success. In the week prior to its release, True Colors ranked first in album pre-orders in both South Korea and Japan, per Hottracks and Tower Records respectively. On the first day of release, the digital release topped the iTunes Stores of fifteen countries and territories, and debuted at number four on the iTunes Worldwide Album Chart. Meanwhile, the physical release sold over 44,000 physical units per the Circle Album Chart, then known as the Gaon Albums Chart, in South Korea. After three days of release, True Colors sold over 73,000 physical copies per the Hanteo Chart, one of South Korea's music chart systems.

True Colors debuted at number one on the Circle Album Chart in South Korea, with over 104,000 units sold; and number five on the Oricon Albums Chart, with over 10,000 units sold. It topped Oricon's Digital Album Chart and the Billboard Japan Top Download Albums Chart, with 5,000 downloads. True Colors sold over 150,000 copies in South Korea, making Yunho the third male solo act to sell over 100,000 copies since the Circle Chart's inception.

== Track listing ==
True Colors track listing
No.	Title	Lyrics	Music	Arrangement	Length
1.	"Follow"	Yoo Young-jin	Yoo; Thomas Troelsen	Yoo; Troelsen	3:33
2.	"Blue Jeans"	Hwang Yu-bin	Choi Jin-suk; Andrew Choi; Oh Seung-eun; Andreas Baertels	Choi Jin-suk	3:16
3.	"Swing" (featuring BoA)	Lee Seu-ran	Jay Putty; Kyle Lampi; Josh Bertram; Jacob Plough; Greg Haimandos; Emily Kim Yeon-seo; SQUAR	Putty; Lampi; Bertram; Plough; Haimandos; Kim; SQUAR	3:21
4.	"불러 (Hit Me Up)" (featuring Giriboy)	Rick Bridges; Giriboy; Kim Moon-suk (Jam Factory)	LDN Noise; Ebenezer	LDN Noise; Ebenezer	3:19
5.	"왜 (Why)"	Jane; Kriz	Dress; Jane; Kriz	Dress	3:44
6.	"Change the World"	Yoo	Hwang Chan-hee; Simon Petrén	Petrén	3:35
Total length:					20:51

== Credits ==
Credits adapted from the EP's liner notes.

Studio

- SM Booming System – recording, digital editing, engineered for mix, mixing (track 1, 3, 6)
- SM Blue Cup Studio – recording (track 2, 5), mixing (track 2)
- In Grid Studio – recording (track 2)
- SM LVYIN Studio – recording (track 3), engineered for mix (track 5), mixing (track 5)
- Doobdoob Studio – recording (track 4–5), digital editing (track 2, 4–5)
- SM Big Shot Studio – engineered for mix (track 2, 4), mixing (track 4)
- SM SSAM Studio – engineered for mix (track 4)
- Sonic Korea – mastering (track 1, 3, 6)
- 821 Sound – mastering (track 2, 4–5)

Personnel

- SM Entertainment – executive producer
- Lee Soo-man – producer
- Lee Sung-soo – production director
- Kim Young-min – executive supervisor
- U-Know – vocals (all tracks), background vocals (track 3, 6)
- BoA – vocals (track 3)
- Giriboy – vocals, lyrics (track 4)
- Yoo Young-jin – producer, composition, arrangement (track 1), lyrics (track 1, 6), vocal directing, background vocals, recording, digital editing, engineered for mix, mixing (track 1, 3, 6), music and sound supervisor (all tracks)
- Thomas Troelsen – producer, composition, arrangement (track 1)
- Hwang Yu-bin – lyrics (track 2)
- Choi Jin-suk a.k.a. Jinbyjin – producer, composition, arrangement, vocal directing, background vocals (track 2)
- Andrew Choi – composition, background vocals (track 2)
- Oh Seung-eun – composition (track 2)
- Andreas Baertels – composition (track 2)
- Lee Seu-ran – lyrics (track 3)
- Jay Putty – composition, arrangement (track 3)
- Kyle Lampi – composition, arrangement (track 3)
- Josh Bertram – composition, arrangement (track 3)
- Jacob Plough – composition, arrangement (track 3)
- Greg Haimandos – composition, arrangement (track 3)
- Emily Kim Yeon-seo – composition, arrangement, vocal directing (track 3)
- SQUAR – producer, composition, arrangement (track 3)
- Rick Bridges – lyrics (track 4)
- Kim Moon-suk (Jam Factory) – lyrics (track 4)
- LDN Noise – producer, composition, arrangement (track 4)
- Ebenezer – producer, composition, arrangement (track 4)
- Jane – lyrics, composition, background vocals (track 5)
- Kriz – lyrics, composition, background vocals (track 5)
- Dress – producer, composition, arrangement, vocal directing, background vocals, drums, bass, piano, strings, brass (track 5)
- Hwang Chan-hee – composition (track 6)
- Simon Petrén – producer, composition, arrangement (track 6)
- Ju Chan-yang (Iconic Sounds) – vocal directing, background vocals (track 4)
- Deez – vocal directing (track 5)
- Oaisle – background vocals (track 5)
- Glowingdog – background vocals, keyboards (track 5)
- Koo Won-chan – background vocals (track 5)
- Yang Geun-young – background vocals (track 6)
- Jo Won-sang – bass (track 5)
- Park Ji-hwan – guitar (track 5)
- Jung Eui-seok – recording (track 2, 5), mixing (track 2)
- Jeong Eun-kyung – recording (track 2)
- Lee Ji-hong – recording (track 3), engineered for mix (track 5), mixing (track 5)
- Jang Woo-young – recording (track 4–5), digital editing (track 2, 4–5)
- Min Sung-soo – recording (track 4)
- Lee Min-kyu – engineered for mix (track 2, 4), mixing (track 4)
- Noh Min-ji – engineered for mix (track 4)
- Jeon Hoon – mastering (track 1, 3, 6)
- Kwon Nam-woo – mastering (track 2, 4–5)

== Charts ==
=== Weekly charts ===
Weekly chart performance for True Colors
Chart (2019)	Peak position
Japanese Albums (Oricon)	5
Japanese Hot Albums (Billboard Japan)	5
South Korean Albums (Circle)	1

=== Monthly charts ===
Monthly chart performance for True Colors
Chart (2019)	Position
South Korean Albums (Circle)	2

=== Yearly charts ===
Yearly chart performance for True Colors
Chart (2019)	Position
South Korean Albums (Circle)	40
