= L.U.C.A.: The Beginning =

2021 South Korean television series

- Promotional poster
- Hangul: 루카: 더 비기닝
- RR: Ruka: deo bigining
- MR: Ruk'a: tŏ pigining
- Genre: Crime; Action; Science fiction; Mystery
- Created by: Studio Dragon (planning)
- Screenplay by: Cheon Seon-il
- Directed by: Kim Hong-seon
- Music by: Kim Tae-seong
- Country of origin: South Korea
- Original language: Korean
- No. of episodes: 12

Production
- Executive producer: Kim Ryun-hee
- Producers: Jung Min-chae; Park Jong-hak
- Production companies: Take One Company; H House

Original release
- Network: tvN
- Release: February 1 – March 9, 2021

L.U.C.A.: The Beginning (Korean: 루카: 더 비기닝) is a South Korean television series starring Kim Rae-won and Lee Da-hee. It aired on tvN from February 1 to March 9, 2021.

== Synopsis ==
Zi O (Kim Rae-won) has a special power and a secret, but he doesn't know who he really is. He is chased by mysterious figures while he tries to find answers to numerous questions that surround him.

Ha Neul-ae-goo-reum (Lee Da-hee) is a detective. When she decides on a course of action, she won't change her mind no matter what. Her parents disappeared when she was only a young child. Goo-reum chases after the truth behind her parents' disappearance. She meets Zi O, and her life changes.

== Cast ==
=== Main ===
- Kim Rae-won as Zi O
  - Oh Han-kyul as young Zi O

A man who has a secret power and is wanted by Human Tech. He doesn't remember anything after waking up from a major happening. He decides to find out who he really is after being chased by unknown people, while understanding that he is not a normal person.

- Lee Da-hee as Ha Neul-ae-goo-reum
  - Seo Eun-sol as young Ha Neul-ae-goo-reum

A detective in the Violent Crimes unit 1st team in Juan Metropolitan Police Station. She was originally from the Major Crimes unit, but was demoted. Her parents went missing when she was a kid, and for nine years she never stops looking for them.

- Kim Sung-oh as Lee Son

A former Special Forces soldier. He was sentenced to life imprisonment for having accidentally killed 9 people during a tactical training, when he threw a grenade instead of a flare. He was offered by Cheol-soo to work for him, and lead a chasing team to capture Zi O. He had lost his entire right arm in a past attempt to capture Zi O, and Human Tech had to install an artificial one for him.

=== Supporting ===
==== L.U.C.A. Project ====
- Park Hyuk-kwon as Kim Cheol-soo

A secret influential figure from the National Intelligence Service. He supports Joong-kwon and the project in order to get very rich if it succeeds, and will do anything in order to make the project successful.

- Ahn Nae-sang as Ryu Joong-kwon

The director of Human Tech and the scientist who oversaw the only success in the project. In the past, he was forced out of the academia for defying the research ethics of "artificial human enhancement". He was subsequently imprisoned for embezzlement of research funds. After that, Cheol-soo supported him in order for the latter to create the most perfect human being.

- Jin Kyung as Hwang Jung-ah

The founder of Human Tech. She is the leader of a cult, but believes in scientific theories rather than the words of God. She is well-connected and rich, but doesn't know what she can use them for, until she finds her target in creating new lives.

==== Juan Metropolitan Police Station ====
- Kim Sang-ho as Choi Jin-hwan

Team leader of the Violent Crimes unit 1st team. He ranks last in the police station for conviction rate, as he is always given the most difficult cases to handle. When Goo-reum first joins his team, he detests her, but he later takes care of her like family.

- Hwang Jae-yeol as Kim Yoo-chul

A detective of the Violent Crimes unit 1st team. He believes in Jin-hwan more than anyone else, and takes care of his juniors delicately. He worries about Goo-reum being persistent in investigating the case surrounding Ji Oh, but is willing to help her till the end.

- Han Kyu-wan as Kim Jin-soo

A detective of the Violent Crimes unit 1st team.

==== Chasing Team ====
- Jung Da-eun as Choi Yoo-na

Part of Lee Son's chasing team to capture Ji Oh. She was sentenced to life imprisonment for having accidentally killed 5 people during a tactical training, when she fired real bullets instead of blanks, and lost her right foot in the same accident. She was offered by Cheol-soo to work for him under Lee Son.

- Kim Min-gwi as Kim Tae-oh

Part of Lee Son's chasing team to capture Ji Oh. An extremely loyal person who executes missions without question.

- Lee Joong-ok as Kim Hwang-sik

Part of Lee Son's chasing team to capture Ji Oh. He is a network technician who was discharged due to corruption.

==== Others ====
- Lee Hae-young as Oh Jong-hwan

A professor working under the National Forensic Service. He was close friends with Joong-kwon during their college days, but after the latter crossed the line that scientists should not cross, he led people to force Joong-kwon out of the academia.

- Ahn Chang-hwan as Won-yi

Zi O's friend. He is the only person who knows about Zi O's power, and in the past he used it for mischief.

- Lee Yong-nyeo as Sister Stella
- Kim Hyung-min as Ha Young-jae

Goo-reum's father who is currently missing. He is the co-founder of Human Tech, and the co-researcher for the L.U.C.A. Project.

=== Special appearances ===
- Lee Won-jong as Kim Man-sik

Zi O's colleague in Dagyeong Resources. (Ep. 1)

- Jung Eun-chae as Director Jung

The chief inspector of National Intelligence Service's inspection team, working with Jung-ah under the pretext of antibodies. (Ep. 8-12)

- Lee Min-young as Cameo (Ep. 12)

== Original soundtrack ==
L.U.C.A.: The Beginning OST

Soundtrack album by Various artists
- Released: 2021
- Genre: Soundtrack
- Languages: Korean; English
- Labels: Genie Music; Stone Music Entertainment

=== Part 1 ===
Released on February 9, 2021
No.	Title	Lyrics	Music	Artist	Length
1.	"Your Eyes"	Jayins; Naiv	Jayins; Naiv	Sunwoo Jung-a	3:39
2.	"Your Eyes" (inst.)		Jayins; Naiv		3:39
Total length:					7:18

=== Part 2 ===
Released on February 16, 2021
No.	Title	Lyrics	Music	Artist	Length
1.	"LUCA"	Choi Jung-in; Safira.K	Choi Jung-in; Jung Sung-min (POPKID)	Jemma	3:20
2.	"LUCA" (inst.)		Choi Jung-in; Jung Sung-min (POPKID)		3:20
Total length:					6:40

=== Part 3 ===
Released on February 23, 2021
No.	Title	Lyrics	Music	Artist	Length
1.	"Your Eyes (Acoustic Ver.)"	Jayins; Naiv	Jayins; Naiv	Lee Da-hee	3:42
2.	"Your Eyes (Acoustic Ver.)" (inst.)		Jayins; Naiv		3:42
Total length:					7:24

=== Part 4 ===
Released on March 2, 2021
No.	Title	Lyrics	Music	Artist	Length
1.	"Gone"	Choi Jung-in; DANI; Haru	Choi Jung-in; Park Geun-chul; Jung Soo-min	KLANG	3:42
2.	"Gone" (inst.)		Choi Jung-in; Park Geun-chul; Jung Soo-min		3:42
Total length:					7:24

== Viewership ==
L.U.C.A.: The Beginning : South Korea viewers per episode (thousands)

Season	Episode number												Average
Season	1	2	3	4	5	6	7	8	9	10	11	12	Average
1	1309	1362	1380	1366	1224	1309	1257	1411	1412	1370	1198	1285	1324

Source: Audience measurement performed nationwide by Nielsen Korea.

Average TV viewership ratings
Ep.	Original broadcast date	Average audience share (Nielsen Korea)	
Ep.	Original broadcast date	Nationwide	Seoul
1	February 1, 2021	5.371% (1st)	6.099% (1st)
2	February 2, 2021	5.802% (1st)	6.782% (1st)
3	February 8, 2021	5.794% (1st)	6.596% (1st)
4	February 9, 2021	5.811% (1st)	6.392% (1st)
5	February 15, 2021	5.348% (1st)	6.237% (1st)
6	February 16, 2021	5.676% (1st)	6.301% (1st)
7	February 22, 2021	5.670% (1st)	6.085% (1st)
8	February 23, 2021	6.118% (1st)	7.005% (1st)
9	March 1, 2021	6.228% (1st)	6.535% (1st)
10	March 2, 2021	6.299% (1st)	6.939% (1st)
11	March 8, 2021	5.491% (1st)	6.173% (1st)
12	March 9, 2021	5.974% (1st)	6.328% (1st)
Average		5.799%	6.456%
In the table above, the blue numbers represent the lowest ratings and the red numbers represent the highest ratings.; This drama airs on a cable channel/pay TV which normally has a relatively smaller audience compared to free-to-air TV/public broadcasters (KBS, SBS, MBC and EBS).
