= Nevertheless (TV series) =

2021 South Korean television series

- Promotional poster
- Hangul: 알고있지만,
- Lit.: I Know But,
- RR: Algo itjiman,
- MR: Algo itchiman,
- Genre: Romance
- Created by: JTBC
- Based on: Nevertheless by Jung Seo
- Written by: Jung Won
- Directed by: Kim Ga-ram
- Starring: Han So-hee; Song Kang
- Composers: Kim Tae-sung; Cho Kyung-hee
- Country of origin: South Korea
- Original language: Korean
- No. of episodes: 10

Production
- Executive producers: Joo Sa-hyun; Soo Sung-kyung
- Producers: Jung Ah-reum; Kwon Mi-kyung; Park Seong-eun; Kim Bo-reum
- Cinematography: Moon Mun-hwan; Choi Young-ki
- Editors: Shin Seung-ah; Lee Ga-young
- Running time: 70 minutes
- Production companies: Studio N; Beyond J; JTBC Studios

Original release
- Network: JTBC
- Release: June 19 – August 21, 2021

Nevertheless, (Korean: 알고있지만,) is a 2021 South Korean television series starring Han So-hee and Song Kang. Based on a popular webtoon of the same name which was first published on Naver Webtoon, it tells the story of two people who are attracted to each other but are skeptical about love, owing to their past relationships. It aired on JTBC from June 19 to August 21, 2021, every Saturday at 23:00 (KST). Each episode was released on Netflix in South Korea and internationally after its television broadcast.

A Japanese remake titled Nevertheless: The Shapes of Love starring Ryusei Yokohama and Sara Minami aired on Netflix on 9 December 2024.

== Synopsis ==
An uncertain romance begins between Yoo Na-bi, a heartbroken woman who no longer believes in love, and Park Jae-eon, a flirtatious man who does not want to commit to a relationship, but gradually starts to fall in love with Na-Bi.

== Cast ==
=== Main ===
- Han So-hee as Yoo Na-bi, a student at Hongseo University's Sculpture Department who has given up on love but still wants to go out on dates. Due to a cruel experience with her ex-boyfriend, she no longer believes in destiny and has vowed never to fall in love again.
- Song Kang as Park Jae-eon, a student at Hongseo University's Sculpture Department who thinks relationships are a bother but likes to flirt. He is kind and friendly to everyone but is actually uninterested in other people. He is an expert in playing hard to get and does not show his true feelings.
- Chae Jong-hyeop as Yang Do-hyeok, Na-bi's childhood friend whose first love is her. He runs a popular cooking show on YouTube.
- Lee Yul-eum as Yoon Seol-ah, Jae-eon's middle school classmate and ex-girlfriend.
- Yang Hye-ji as Oh Bit-na, Na-bi's best friend.

=== Supporting ===
- Kim Min-gwi as Nam Gyu-hyun, Bit-na's best friend.
- Lee Ho-jung as Yoon Sol, Ji-wan's best friend.
- Yoon Seo-ah as Seo Ji-wan, Sol's best friend.
- Jung Jae-kwang as Ahn Kyung-joon, Jae-eon and Na-bi's senior.

=== Extended ===
- Han Eu-ddeum as Jo Min-young, a teaching assistant of the Sculpture Department.
- Yoon Sa-bong as Jung Sook-eun, Na-bi's aunt who raised her as a daughter.
- Seo Hye-won as Jang Se-young, Na-bi's department junior.
- Lee Seung-hyub as Joo Hyuk
- Kim Mu-jun as Yoo Se-hoon
- Yoo Ji-hyun as Yoon-ji
- Son Bo-seung as Min-sang, a senior member of the social group of art students.
- Seo Bum-june as Hwang Jin-soo
- Lee Jung-ha as Kim Eun-han
- Jin Ho-eun as Seo Ji-wan's friend

=== Special appearances ===
- Choi Sung-jae as Yoo Hyeon-woo, Na-bi's ex-boyfriend.
- Ha Do-kwon as the older brother of Jae-eon's ex-girlfriend.
- Go Won-hee as a woman at the bar
- Seo Jeong-yeon as Jae-eon's mother

== Production ==
- The first script reading of the cast was held on March 5, 2021, and filming began the same month. Filming continued for about four months and wrapped up on July 6 in Seoul.
- On June 3, 2021, it was revealed that some episodes of the series were in discussion to air under rated 19.
- In July 2021, actor Kim Min-gwi was embroiled in a controversy when an article about his personal life was posted on an online community. Because of this, JTBC announced on the 28th that his appearance on Nevertheless would be edited out as much as possible from episode 8.

== Original soundtrack ==
=== Part 1 ===
Released on June 19, 2021
No.	Title	Lyrics	Music	Artist	Length
1.	"We're Already" (우린 이미)	Kimmuseum	Kimmuseum; Jemn	Kimmuseum	3:58
2.	"We're Already" (Inst.)		Kimmuseum; Jemn		3:58
Total length:					7:56

=== Part 2 ===
Released on June 27, 2021
No.	Title	Lyrics	Music	Artist	Length
1.	"Nevertheless" (알고있지만)	Eaeon	Lee Neung-ryong; Eaeon	Night Off	3:32
2.	"Nevertheless" (Inst.)		Lee Neung-ryong; Eaeon		3:32
Total length:					7:04

=== Part 3 ===
Released on July 4, 2021
No.	Title	Lyrics	Music	Artist	Length
1.	"Whisper"	Park Ji-woo	Park Ji-woo	Park Ji-woo	2:50
2.	"Whisper" (Inst.)		Park Ji-woo		2:50
Total length:					5:40

=== Part 4 ===
Released on July 11, 2021
No.	Title	Lyrics	Music	Artist	Length
1.	"Butterfly"	J.Una	J.Una	J.Una	3:14
2.	"Butterfly" (Inst.)		J.Una		3:14
Total length:					6:28

=== Part 5 ===
Released on July 18, 2021
No.	Title	Lyrics	Music	Artist	Length
1.	"Heavy Heart"	Rio	Rio	Rio	3:34
2.	"Heavy Heart" (Inst.)		Rio		3:34
Total length:					7:08

=== Part 6 ===
Released on July 24, 2021
No.	Title	Lyrics	Music	Artist	Length
1.	"Love Me Like That"	Sam Kim; Zac Poor	Sam Kim; Maxx Song; Zac Poor	Sam Kim	3:31
2.	"Love Me Like That" (Inst.)		Sam Kim; Maxx Song; Zac Poor		3:31
Total length:					7:02

=== Part 7 ===
Released on July 31, 2021
No.	Title	Lyrics	Music	Artist	Length
1.	"Fall in Love" (나도 모르는 사이에)	Doko	Doko	Jukjae	3:59
2.	"Fall in Love" (Inst.)		Doko		3:59
Total length:					7:58

=== Part 8 ===
Released on August 7, 2021
No.	Title	Lyrics	Music	Artist	Length
1.	"So Tender"	Choi Su-mi	Kim Byung-gyu	Say Sue Me	4:28
2.	"So Tender" (Inst.)		Kim Byung-gyu		4:28
Total length:					8:52

== Ratings ==
Average TV viewership ratings
Ep.	Original broadcast date	Title	Average audience share (Nielsen Korea)	
Ep.	Original broadcast date	Title	Nationwide	Seoul
1	June 19, 2021	There's No Such Thing as Fate. Nevertheless,	2.207%	2.5%
2	June 26, 2021	It's Not Only Me. Nevertheless,	1.253%	1.2%
3	July 3, 2021	It Has Already Begun. Nevertheless,	1.173%	N/A
4	July 10, 2021	I Know It Isn't Love. Nevertheless,	1.714%	N/A
5	July 17, 2021	I Know Nothing Will Change. Nevertheless,	1.446%	N/A
6	July 24, 2021	There's No Such Thing as Love. Nevertheless,	1.309%	N/A
7	July 31, 2021	I Know There's No Turning Back. Nevertheless,	1.457%	N/A
8	August 7, 2021	I Know It's a Lie. Nevertheless,	0.994%	N/A
9	August 14, 2021	I Know It's Over. Nevertheless,	1.437%	N/A
10	August 21, 2021	Nevertheless, I Still…	1.7%	N/A
In the table above, the blue numbers represent the lowest ratings and the red numbers represent the highest ratings.; N/A denotes ratings that were not released.; This series aired on a cable channel/pay TV which normally has a relatively smaller audience compared to free-to-air TV/public broadcasters (KBS, SBS, MBC and EBS).

== Difference between webtoon and drama of “Nevertheless" ==
- First meeting is different
  - In the webtoon, the first meeting is at their university. They naturally encounter each other on campus as senior and junior students. After that they meet at a social gathering with fellow students.
  - In the drama, Yoo Na-bi first meets Park Jae-eon at a bar shortly after being hurt by her ex-boyfriend. Through their conversation, they gradually become closer.

- Story about Jae-eon's Family Background
  - In the webtoon, Park Jae-eon openly talks about his personal life. He mentions that both of his parents are teachers and he is unable to live on his own.
  - In the drama, Park Jae-eon hides details about his personal life. Also his mother's job is different from that in the webtoon.(musician)

- Differences in the Later Storyline and Ending
  - In the webtoon, In the later part of the webtoon, Na-bi realizes that her relationship with Park Jae-eon is causing her emotional pain and decides to leave him. Rather than being portrayed as someone who loves Na-bi in a healthy way, he remains a character who makes her feel anxious and hurt. In the end, Na-bi and Jae-eon break up. The story suggests the possibility of a future relationship between Na-bi and Do-hyeok, but the ending remains open to interpretation.
  - In the drama, Na-bi and Jae-eon confirm their feelings for each other. The story concludes with the two characters ending up together.

- More Detailed Portrayal of Supporting Characters’ Relationships in the Drama
  - In the original webtoon does not significantly explore the relationship between Yoon Sol and Seo Jiwan, the drama adaptation expands their storyline and portrays them as a romantic same-sex couple.
  - In the webtoon, the relationship between Oh Bit-na and Nam Gyu-hyun is not explored. However, in the drama asaptation develops them into a romantic couple.
  - In the webtoon, Min-young and Kyung-Jun's relationship is not shown. However, in the drama they live together and become closer to each other.

- Difference in Na-bi's birthday
  - In the webtoon, Her ex-boyfriend personally visits her and gives her a gift. Also her mother is portrayed as a kind woman.
  - In the drama, Her aunt is portrayed as caring and supportive, while her mother appears more indifferent.

- Differences in Yang Do-hyeok's Role
  - In the webtoon, Yang Do-hyeok serves as an important point of comparison that helps Na-bi move on from Park Jae-eon. When Na-bi stays at her aunt's house, she reunites with Do-hyeok, her childhood friend. Throughout the story, Do-hyeok provides Na-bi with emotional stability and support. Although he confesses his feelings to her, Na-bi rejects him because she was confused about her feelings for Jae-eon.
  - In the drama, Do-hyeok also appears as Na-bi's childhood friend. However, the relationship between Na-bi and Jae-eon is given much greater emphasis. As a result, Do-hyeok functions less as a stable alternative and more as a supporting male character who helps Na-bi realize and confirm her feelings for Jae-eon.

- Differences in the Later Storyline and Ending
  - In the webtoon, In the later part of the webtoon, Na-bi realizes that her relationship with Park Jae-eon is causing her emotional pain and decides to leave him. Rather than being portrayed as someone who loves Na-bi in a healthy way, he remains a character who makes her feel anxious and hurt. In the end, Na-bi and Jae-eon break up. The story suggests the possibility of a future relationship between Na-bi and Do-hyeok, but the ending remains open to interpretation.
  - In the drama, Na-bi and Jae-eon confirm their feelings for each other. The story concludes with the two characters ending up together.

- More Detailed Portrayal of Supporting Characters’ Relationships in the Drama
  - In the original webtoon, there is no romantic relationship between Yoon Sol and Seo Ji-Wan. However, in the drama, they appear as a secondary couple. The two have been friends since childhood. At first, they seem like close friends, but as the story progresses, it becomes clear that Sol's feelings for Ji-wan go beyond friendship. Although Ji-wan also has feelings for Sol, she hides them because she is afraid of ruining their friendship and feels unfamiliar with the idea of a same-sex relationship. The two repeatedly experience jealousy, misunderstandings, and emotional avoidance before finally acknowledging their feelings for each other and becoming a couple.
  - The relationship between Oh Bit-na and Kim Gyu-hyun is not specifically explored in the original webtoon. In the drama, however, their story begins when Gyu-hyun takes care of Bit-na after she becomes drunk, and the two end up spending the night together. Bit-na later feels uncomfortable and conflicted about the situation. As their ambiguous relationship continues, Gyu-hyun eventually confesses his feelings to her. Bit-na is portrayed as someone who is free-spirited in her approach to dating, has considerable dating experience, and often attracts attention from many men, resulting in unstable relationships. Gyu-hyun, on the other hand, is deeply devoted to one person at a time, making him jealous and possessive. Their differing views on love create ongoing conflicts even after they begin dating. Through this couple, the drama further explores themes such as casual versus serious relationships, and stable versus unstable forms of love, reflecting and expanding upon the themes represented by Na-bi and Jae-eon.
  - The original webtoon does not depict a relationship between Min-young and Gyeong-jun. In the drama, however, they are both teaching assistants in the sculpture department and work together in the same office. Due to Min-young's personal circumstances, she ends up living in Gyeong-jun's house. Their cohabitation does not begin because of mutual romantic interest, but rather out of necessity. As they continue living together, they gradually develop feelings for one another. Through their story, the drama portrays the process of two people growing closer while sharing everyday life, offering another perspective on love and relationships among young adults.

- Nabi's Attitude Toward Jae-eon
  - In the webtoon, Na-bi realizes early on that Jae-eon is emotionally dangerous. However, she is unable to distance herself from him. -> Many readers become frustrated with her behavior.
  - In the drama, By emphasizing Jae-eon's kind and caring side, the drama makes it easier for viewers to understand why Na-bi remains conflicted about her feelings for him. As a result, her emotional struggles and hesitation appear more understandable and relatable to the audience.

- Park Jae-eon's True Feelings
  - In the webtoon, Park Jae-eon remains emotionally ambiguous until the end. Although it is clear that he is attracted to Na-bi, webtoon suggests a distinction between simply liking and genuinely loving her. As a result, his true feelings are never fully clarified.
  - In the drama, Park Jae-eon's sincere feelings become increasingly evident as the story progresses. He continues to express his emotions to Na-bi. This development ultimately makes their reunion possible.

- Realization of the Butterfly Tattoo
  - In the webtoon, Park Jae-eon encounters a female friend at a bar. During this encounter, both Na-bi and the female friend notice the butterfly tattoo that Jaeon had designed.
  - In the drama, Park Jae-eon meets a female friend in an alley. Na-bi only notices the butterfly tattoo that Jae-eon had designed on the woman's arm.

== Reasons for the Differences between the webtoon and the Korean drama“Nevertheless” ==
- Characteristics of the Medium
  - In the webtoon, the protagonist's thoughts and emotions can be portrayed in greater detail through both text and illustrations. As a result, psychological descriptions—such as why Yoo Na-bi feels anxious and why she is drawn to Park Jae-eon—play a very important role in the story.
  - In a drama, however, viewers cannot constantly read a character's inner thoughts. Therefore, emotions must be conveyed primarily through actions, dialogue, and events. For this reason, the drama emphasizes conflicts more strongly than the original webtoon and presents relationships between characters in a more dramatic way.
  - When a webtoon is adapted into a drama, the drama can develop the story while effectively establishing the world-building and character settings, allowing for many points of synergy with the webtoon's narrative structure.At the same time, dramas are adapted in a way that emphasizes conflict more than webtoons and portrays the relationships between characters more dramatically.
  - For example, in the webtoon, a significant amount of time is devoted to Na-bi's internal struggles and her gradual realization about love. In contrast, the drama expresses her emotions through external events, such as her conflicts with Jae-eon and the appearance of Yoon Seol-a, allowing viewers to understand her feelings through direct inner narration.

- Changes to Park Jae-eon's character
  - In the webtoon, Park Jae-eon is portrayed as someone whom Yoo Na-bi likes but should not be involved with romantically. He represents a relationship that is attractive yet emotionally unhealthy.
  - In the drama, however, Jae-eon serves as the male lead, meaning viewers need a reason to support and sympathize with him. As a result, some aspects of his relationships with Yoon Seol-a. The drama also places greater emphasis on his genuine feelings for Na-bi.
  - Because of these changes, the webtoon version of Jae-eon symbolizes an unhealthy romantic relationship, while the drama reinterprets him as a wounded male protagonist who struggles with his own emotional scars.

- Expansion of Supporting Characters
  - In the drama, several scenes and characters from the original webtoon are reorganized around Park Jae-eon. This adaptation helps the story progress more efficiently within a limited number of episodes.
  - By reducing the number of characters and concentrating important events on a smaller group of people, the drama makes the storyline easier for viewers to follow and understand.
  - Drama adaptations of webtoons are typically produced with 10 to 20 episodes; in the case of Nevertheless, which consists of 10 episodes, it is difficult to fill the screen with only the story of the main characters.

- Combining Scenes and Reducing Characters
  - In the drama, several scenes and characters from the original webtoon are reorganized around Park Jae-eon. This adaptation helps the story progress more efficiently within a limited number of episodes.
  - By reducing the number of characters and concentrating important events in a smaller group of people, the drama makes the storyline easier for viewers to follow and understand.

- A Change in the Messages of the Story
  - The differences between the webtoon and the drama are not simply the result of adaptation; they also reflect a shift in the message the story aims to convey.
  - The webtoon is ultimately a story about Yoo Na-bi's personal growth as she learns not to lose herself in an unstable and emotionally confusing relationship. It focuses on self-discovery and emotional independence.
  - Media transformation is not simply a matter of transferring the original work; it is a process of reconstructing the story to suit the characteristics of the target medium and its consumer base.
  - The drama, on the other hand, is more of a romantic story about two emotionally wounded people who learn about love through each other and eventually find their way back together.
  - Therefore, the changes in scenes, characters, and storylines were made not only to suit the characteristics of the television medium but also to create a romance narrative that a wider audience could relate to. This transformation in theme and message represents one of the most significant differences between the webtoon and the drama.

== The Japanese remake drama, "Nevertheless": The Shape of Love ==
- The Japanese remake of the drama Nevertheless, which originally starred actors Song Kang and Han So-hee, features Yokohama Ryusei and Minami Sara in the lead roles, and is directed by Ryutaro Nakagawa.

- The Korean drama Nevertheless aired on JTBC from June 19, 2021, to August 21, 2021. The Japanese drama "The Shapes of Love" was released worldwide on December 9, 2024, through Netflix and the Japanese online video service (OTT) ABEMA.

- The Korean drama Nevertheless consists of 10 episodes with an average running time of about one hour, while the Japanese drama "The Shapes of Love" consists of 8 episodes with an average running time of about 30 minutes.

- Specific geographic locations
  - The Japanese drama is set in Kamakura, Japan. Miu and several other characters either graduated from or work as teaching assistants at an art university located in Kamakura. Ren Kosaka, the male protagonist, is also portrayed as a native of Kamakura. This setting provides a narrative explanation for his return to the university as a temporary instructor despite his success as a professional artist.
