= Low Life (TV series) =

South Korean television series

- Promotional poster
- Hangul: 파인: 촌뜨기들
- Lit.: Pine: The Countrymen
- RR: Pain: chontteugideul
- MR: P'ain: ch'onttŭgidŭl
- Genre: Crime; Period drama
- Based on: The Hooligans by Yoon Tae-ho
- Written by: Kang Yun-seong; Ahn Seung-hwan
- Directed by: Kang Yun-seong
- Starring: Ryu Seung-ryong; Yang Se-jong; Im Soo-jung; Kim Eui-sung; Hong Ki-joon; Kim Sung-oh; Lee Dong-hwi; Kim Jong-soo; Woo Hyun; Jung Yun-ho; Jang Gwang; Lee Sang-jin; Im Hyung-joon; Kim Min
- Music by: Yoon Il-sang
- Country of origin: South Korea
- Original language: Korean
- No. of episodes: 11

Production
- Executive producers: Park Joon-seo; Kim Jae-wook; Sun Young; Park Joon-hui; Kang Yun-seong; Lee Kyung-sik (C.P.)
- Producers: Shim Moon-bo; Park Hye-jin
- Cinematography: Lee Sung-jae
- Animator: Park Na-rae
- Editors: Heo Sun-mi; Kim Joo-hyun; Han Young-gyu
- Running time: 50–69 minutes
- Production companies: SLL; Whyworks Entertainment; ForEntertainment; Playgram; Heungbune Bakssine; MYM Entertainment

Original release
- Network: Disney+
- Release: July 16 – August 13, 2025

Low Life (Korean: 파인: 촌뜨기들) is a 2025 South Korean period drama television series written by and directed by Kang Yun-sung. The series stars an ensemble cast led by Ryu Seung-ryong, Yang Se-jong, and Im Soo-jung. It aired on Disney+ from July 16, to August 13, 2025.

== Plot ==
In 1323, a ship carrying 8,000 gold coins and 20,000 valuable Chinese ceramic pots sank in the Yellow Sea. Treasure hunters recovered many pots over the years, but the gold was never found. In the 1970s, small-time crooks Gwan-seok and his nephew Hee-dong serve time in prison, where they befriend an antique dealer named Song Gi-taek. Inside, they run a smuggling scheme, and after their release in 1977, Gi-taek offers them a deal: salvage the remaining ceramics near Sinan in exchange for substantial payment.

Gwan-seok discovers Gi-taek intends to underpay them and also plans to mix counterfeit ceramics with genuine ones to cheat Chairman Chun Hwang-sik of Heungbaek Industries, who wants the antiques to launder money while building a university. Gwan-seok forces Gi-taek to raise their payout, and Gi-taek introduces his nephew Na Dae-sik as supervisor, though he proves incompetent. Hwang-sik's wife, Yang Jung-sook, suspicious of the operation, sends her aide Im Jeon-chul to oversee it.

The group bases their operation in Mokpo with Gi-taek's contact, Mr. Ha Yeong-soo, and hires a captain, Hwang Tae-san, despite Gwan-seok's distrust of his police ties. As various factions—including the fraudster Professor Kim—compete for the treasure, Gwan-seok demands more money, forcing Gi-taek to order additional counterfeit pots. Jung-sook later reveals she knows Gi-taek's scam and will only pay high prices for real ceramics, weakening Gi-taek's profits. Meanwhile, she begins an affair with Hee-dong.

As Hwang-sik's health deteriorates, Jung-sook manipulates him into worsening his condition to seize his assets. During a salvage dive, a crew member suffers a collapsed lung and is later drowned by Gwan-seok and Tae-san to avoid sharing profits. Gi-taek, desperate after being cut out by Jung-sook, proposes a new deal, but tensions escalate.

The crew eventually uncovers the full shipwreck and retrieves a large haul of ceramics. During the chaotic struggle for control, Gwan-seok and Tae-san kill Jeon-chul, angering Jung-sook. She obtains Hwang-sik's seal, only to discover Heungbaek Industries is deeply in debt. After Hwang-sik unexpectedly recovers and exposes her theft, she suffers a miscarriage.

Song tricks Kim's gang into stealing counterfeit pots meant for Hwang-sik, but Kim survives an explosion that kills his men. Hee-dong betrays all sides, fleeing with most of the ceramics and the local girl he loves. Kim hunts down Gi-taek's remaining associates and kills them.

As Hwang-sik is arrested for corporate crimes, his first wife hires Gwan-seok to kill Jung-sook. Hee-dong meets Jung-sook, who proposes selling the remaining real pots and splitting the profits, but Gwan-seok intercepts them. At a cliff side confrontation, Jung-sook fights with the first wife, who falls to her death. A truck filled with pots falls over the cliff, seemingly killing Gwan-seok, and Jung-sook is later murdered by the first wife's surviving henchman.

A year later, Hee-dong lives quietly in Seoul. Gwan-seok, having survived and salvaged some ceramics, shares the profits with Hee-dong and resumes treasure hunting with a new crew.

== Cast and characters ==
=== Main ===
- Ryu Seung-ryong as Oh Gwan-seok
  - Ryu Ji-hun as young Oh Gwan-seok

Leader of a group of country bumpkins on the quest for hidden treasure.

- Yang Se-jong as Oh Hee-dong
  - Ko Gyeong-min as young Oh Hee-dong

Gwan-seok's nephew who joins him on his quest.

- Im Soo-jung as Yang Jung-sook

Chairman Chun's wife who has an exceptional instinct for money.

- Kim Eui-sung as Professor Kim

A cunning antique fraudster from Busan, skilled in trickery and deception.

- Hong Ki-joon as Hwang Tae-san

The captain of a Mokpo ship.

- Kim Sung-oh as Im Jeon-chul

Chairman Chun's personal chauffeur.

- Lee Dong-hwi as Sim Hong-gi

A Mokpo police sergeant.

- Kim Jong-soo as Song Gi-taek

An antique appraiser, and the boss of Dongyang Art, an antique shop.

- Woo Hyun as Ha Yeong-soo

An expert of ceramics.

- Jung Yun-ho as Jang Beol-gu

A thug based in Mokpo.

- Jang Gwang as Chun Hwang-sik

The chairman of Heungbaek Industries, and the primary financier behind the treasure hunt.

- Lee Sang-jin as Na Dae-sik

Mr. Song's assistant.

- Im Hyung-joon as Go Seok-bae

A diver.

- Kim Min as Park Seon-ja

The cashier of Lucky Cafe.

=== Supporting ===
- Kim Jin-wook as Lee Bok-geun

A diver and the only person who knows where the Sinan Celadon Shipwreck is located.

- Choi Jae-hwan

A ship owner from Mokpo and captain Hwang's nephew.

- Park Bo-kyung as Mr. Jin

Owner of Maralin Botique.

- Jung Hyung-suk as Director Lee

An executive director of Heungbaek Industries.

- Son Jong-hak as Han Sung-chul

A kiln-site owner and pottery master.

- Noh Jeong-hyeon as Pil-man

Beol-gu's subordinate.

- Hong Jung-in as Do-hun

Beol-guz's subordinate.

- Kwon Dong-ho as Deok-san

Grandma Yang's son.

- Won Hyun-jun as Coach Kim

A professional wrestling gym coach.

=== Others ===
- Woo Mi-hwa as Madame Jang

The lady boss of Lucky Cafe.

- Ju Bo-bi as Jong-mal

The cashier of Lucky Cafe.

- Go Yoon as Manager Kang

A manager at Heungbaek Industries.

- Song Dong-hwan as Manager Yoon

A general manager at Heungbaek Industries.

- Kim Yong-seok as Bodyguard Kim
- Kim Jin-yeon as Bodyguard Park
- Kim Eun-bi as a housemaid
- Choi Hee-jin as Gwan-seok's wife
- Kim Tae-yul as Gwan-seok's son
- Kim Seo-heon as Gwan-seok's daughter
- Ha Na-ri as Hee-dong's mother

=== Special appearances ===
- Seo Kyung-seok as Captain Park
- Park Sang-myun as Captain Kim
- Kim Min-jae as a man in Deoksan Antiques
- Young Tak as Mr. Choi

A customs officer.

== Production ==
In July 2023, it was reported that Ji Chang-wook and Ryu Seung-ryong were in talks to star as an uncle-nephew duo in a new adaptation of Yoon Tae-ho's webtoon. However, both actors' agencies clarified that the series was only one of several offers. Ji Chang-wook later declined the role in October 2023, and the production was delayed until 2024.

In late 2023, Yang Se-jong and Im Soo-jung were also reported to be joining the cast. A script reading took place on March 6, 2024. On April 15, 2024, Disney+ officially confirmed the production of Low Life and announced the cast lineup.

== Release ==
It is scheduled to premiere on Disney+ on July 16, 2025, with the first three episodes released on June 16, followed by two episodes each Wednesday.

== Accolades ==
Award ceremony	Year	Category	Recipient(s)	Result	Ref.
Baeksang Arts Awards	2026	Best Drama	Low Life	Nominated	
Baeksang Arts Awards	2026	Best Supporting Actress	Im Soo-jung	Won	
Baeksang Arts Awards	2026	Best New Actor	Kim Jin-wook	Nominated	
Baeksang Arts Awards	2026	Best New Actress	Kim Min	Nominated	
Baeksang Arts Awards	2026	Best Technical Achievement	Kim Nam-sik (VFX)	Nominated	
Director's Cut Awards	2026	Best Director (Drama)	Kang Yun-seong	Won	
Director's Cut Awards	2026	Best Actress (Drama)	Im Soo-jung	Won	
Director's Cut Awards	2026	Best Actor (Drama)	Yang Se-jong	Nominated	
Director's Cut Awards	2026	Best New Actress (Drama)	Im Soo-jung	Nominated	
Director's Cut Awards	2026	Best New Actor (Drama)	Yunho	Won	
