= Alice in Earnestland =

- Theatrical poster
- Directed by: Ahn Gooc-jin
- Written by: Ahn Gooc-jin
- Produced by: Yoo Young-shik; Choi Ik-hwan
- Starring: Lee Jung-hyun
- Cinematography: Lee Seok-jun
- Edited by: Kim Woo-il
- Music by: Jang Young-gyu
- Production company: KAFA Films
- Distributed by: CGV Arthouse
- Release dates: May 1, 2015 (Jeonju International Film Festival); August 13, 2015
- Running time: 90 minutes
- Country: South Korea
- Language: Korean
- Budget: ₩200 million
- Box office: ₩760 million

Alice in Earnestland (Korean: 성실한 나라의 앨리스; RR: Seongsilhan naraui aelliseu) is a 2015 South Korean black comedy film written and directed by Ahn Gooc-jin, in his first feature film. It premiered at the 16th Jeonju International Film Festival where it received the Grand Prize in the Korean Competition; jury member and noted East Asian film critic Tony Rayns praised the film as "Funny, shocking and sometimes cruel, this film has enough invention and energy to take your breath away."

== Plot ==
Soo-nam is a poor woman struggling to pay the hospital bills for her vegetative husband's care, even though her hard work seems to be hopeless. She is suddenly granted the chance for a turnabout when a redevelopment project takes place. When that falls through, Soo-nam discards her honesty and adapts a cold-blooded approach to take revenge on whoever is responsible for her debt-ridden life.

== Cast ==
- Lee Jung-hyun as Soo-nam
- Lee Hae-young as Gyu-jung
- Seo Young-hwa as Kyung-sook
- Myung Gye-nam as Do-chul
- Lee Jun-hyeok as Hyung-suk
- Bae Je-ki as Detective Jo
- Lee Dae-yeon as Chief
- Ji Dae-han as Detective Park
- Lee Yong-nyeo
- Oh Kwang-rok as Art professor
- Lee Seung-joon

== Awards and nominations ==
Year	Award	Category	Recipient	Result
2015	16th Jeonju International Film Festival	Grand Prize (Korean Film Competition)	Alice in Earnestland	Won
2015	39th Hong Kong Asian Film Festival	New Talent Award	Ahn Gooc-jin	Won
2015	35th Korean Association of Film Critics Awards	Best Actress	Lee Jung-hyun	Nominated
2015	36th Blue Dragon Film Awards	Best Actress	Lee Jung-hyun	Won
2016	7th KOFRA Film Awards	Best Independent Film	Alice in Earnestland	Won
2016	7th KOFRA Film Awards	Best Actress	Lee Jung-hyun	Nominated
2016	3rd Wildflower Film Awards	Best Actress	Lee Jung-hyun	Won
2016	3rd Wildflower Film Awards	Best New Director	Ahn Gooc-jin	Nominated
2016	52nd Baeksang Arts Awards	Best Actress	Lee Jung-hyun	Nominated
2016	52nd Baeksang Arts Awards	Best New Director	Ahn Gooc-jin	Nominated
2016	52nd Baeksang Arts Awards	Best Screenplay	Ahn Gooc-jin	Won
2016	16th Director's Cut Awards	Best Independent Film Director	Ahn Gooc-jin	Won
2016	21st Chunsa Film Art Awards	Best Actress	Lee Jung-hyun	Nominated
2016	11th Max Movie Awards	Best Actress	Lee Jung-hyun	Nominated
2016	25th Buil Film Awards	Best Actress	Lee Jung-hyun	Nominated
2016	25th Buil Film Awards	Best New Director	Ahn Gooc-jin	Nominated
2016	25th Buil Film Awards	Best Screenplay	Ahn Gooc-jin	Nominated
