= Director's Cut Awards =

South Korean awards

- Hangul: 디렉터스 컷 시상식
- RR: Direkteoseu keot sisangsik
- MR: Tirekt'ŏsŭ k'ŏt sisangsik
- Poster 21st awards
- Awarded for: Excellence in cinematic achievements
- Date: May 19, 2026
- Country: South Korea
- Presented by: Korea Film Director's Network (Directors Guild of Korea)
- First award: 1998
- Final award: 2026

The Director's Cut Awards (Korean: 디렉터스 컷 시상식) is an annual awards ceremony for excellence in film in South Korea. It is presented by the Korea Film Director's Network (KFDN), a group of approximately 300 Korean filmmakers. The KFDN selects winners in the Korean film industry in eight categories: Director, Actor (Male/Female), New Director, New Actor (Male/Female), Producer and Independent Film Director. It was launched in 1998 by film director Lee Hyun-seung with a membership of "young generation" directors in their twenties to forties.

The ceremony was temporarily discontinued after 2010 due to "internal issues" within the organization. It was resumed in 2014 and held concurrently with the Jecheon International Music and Film Festival (JIMFF).

== Award ceremonies ==
=== 2023 ===
The 21st edition of award ceremony was held on February 24, 2023, at the Convention Hall on the 1st floor of the Chungmu Art Center. Maytree, a cappella group performed a special congratulatory performance during the ceremony.

=== 2022 ===
The 20th edition of award ceremony was held online on February 24, 2022. It was aired live on Naver TV.

== Categories ==
Film

- Best Director
- Best Screenplay
- Best New Director
- Best Actor
- Best Actress
- Best New Actor
- Best New Actress
- Vision Award of the Year (formerly known as Best Independent Film Director)
- International Film Director of the Year (2022, 2023)

Series

- Best Director
- Best Actor
- Best Actress
- Best New Actor
- Best New Actress
- Best Screenplay (2022, 2023)

== Film ==
=== Best Director ===
#	Year	Director	Film
1st	1998	Hur Jin-ho	Christmas in August
2nd	1999	Kang Je-gyu	Shiri
3rd	2000	Park Chan-wook	Joint Security Area
4th	2001	Song Hae-sung	Failan
5th	2002	Park Chan-wook	Sympathy for Mr. Vengeance
6th	2003	Bong Joon-ho	Memories of Murder
7th	2004	Park Chan-wook	Oldboy
8th	2005	Im Sang-soo	The President's Last Bang
9th	2006	Hong Sang-soo	Woman on the Beach
10th	2007	Lee Chang-dong	Secret Sunshine
11th	2008	Kim Jee-woon	The Good, the Bad, the Weird
12th	2009	Park Chan-wook	Thirst
13th	2010	Ryoo Seung-wan	The Unjust
14th	2014	Bong Joon-ho	Snowpiercer
15th	2015	Oh Seung-uk	The Shameless
16th	2016	Na Hong-jin	The Wailing
17th	2017	Bong Joon-ho	Okja
18th	2018	Jang Joon-hwan	1987: When the Day Comes
19th	2019	Bong Joon-ho	Parasite
20th	2022	Lee Joon-ik	The Book of Fish
21st	2023	Park Chan-wook	Decision to Leave
22nd	2024	Kim Sung-su	12.12: The Day
23rd	2025	Jang Jae-hyun	Exhuma
24th	2026	Park Chan-wook	No Other Choice

=== Best Screenplay ===
#	Year	Recipient	Film
18th	2018	Kim Kyung-chan	1987: When the Day Comes
19th	2019	Bong Joon-ho, Han Jin-won	Parasite
10th	2022	Kim Se-gyeom	The Book of Fish
21st	2023	Park Chan-wook, Jeong Seo-kyeong	Decision to Leave
22nd	2024	Kim Sung-su, Hong In-pyo, Hong Won-chan, Lee Young-jong	12.12: The Day
23rd	2025	Jang Jae-hyun	Exhuma
24th	2026	Yoon Ga-eun	The World of Love

=== Best Actor ===
#	Year	Actor	Film
1st	1998	Han Suk-kyu	Christmas in August
2nd	1999	Choi Min-sik	Shiri, Happy End
3rd	2000	Song Kang-ho	Joint Security Area
4th	2001	Choi Min-sik	Failan
5th	2002	Sul Kyung-gu	Oasis
6th	2003	Song Kang-ho	Memories of Murder
7th	2004	Choi Min-sik	Oldboy
8th	2005	Jung Jae-young	Welcome to Dongmakgol, Wedding Campaign
9th	2006	Song Kang-ho, Byun Hee-bong, Park Hae-il	The Host
10th	2007	Song Kang-ho	Secret Sunshine
11th	2008	Ha Jung-woo	The Chaser, My Dear Enemy
12th	2009	Song Kang-ho	Thirst
13th	2010	Choi Min-sik	I Saw the Devil
14th	2014	Song Kang-ho	The Attorney
15th	2015	Hwang Jung-min	Ode to My Father
16th	2016	Lee Byung-hun	Inside Men
17th	2017	Sul Kyung-gu	Memoir of a Murderer
18th	2018	Lee Sung Min	The Spy Gone North
19th	2019	Song Kang-ho	Parasite
20th	2022	Lee Byung-hun	The Man Standing Next
21st	2023	Park Hae-il	Decision to Leave
22nd	2024	Lee Byung-hun	Concrete Utopia
23rd	2025	Lee Byung-hun	The Match
24th	2026	Yoo Hae-jin	The King's Warden

=== Best Actress ===
#	Year	Actress	Film
1st	1998	Shim Eun-ha	Christmas in August
2nd	1999	Jeon Do-yeon	The Harmonium in My Memory, Happy End
3rd	2000	Lee Mi-yeon	Pisces
4th	2001	Jang Jin-young	Sorum
5th	2002	Yunjin Kim	Ardor
6th	2003	Moon So-ri	A Good Lawyer's Wife
6th	2003	Yum Jung-ah	A Tale of Two Sisters
7th	2004	Jeon Do-yeon	My Mother, the Mermaid
8th	2005	Jeon Do-yeon	You Are My Sunshine
8th	2005	Lee Young-ae	Sympathy for Lady Vengeance
9th	2006	Bae Doona, Go Ah-sung	The Host
10th	2007	Jeon Do-yeon	Secret Sunshine
11th	2008	Gong Hyo-jin	Crush and Blush
12th	2009	Kim Hye-ja	Mother
13th	2010	Seo Young-hee	Bedevilled
14th	2014	Shim Eun-kyung	Miss Granny
15th	2015	Jeon Do-yeon	The Shameless
16th	2016	Kim Min-hee	The Handmaiden
17th	2017	Na Moon-hee	I Can Speak
18th	2018	Kim Tae-ri	Little Forest
19th	2019	Han Ji-min	Miss Baek
20th	2022	Jeon Jong-seo	The Call
21st	2023	Tang Wei	Decision to Leave
22nd	2024	Kim Sun-young	Concrete Utopia
23rd	2025	Kim Go-eun	Exhuma
24th	2026	Seo Su-bin	The World of Love

=== Best New Director ===
#	Year	Director	Film
1st	1998	Lee Jeong-hyang	Art Museum by the Zoo
2nd	1999	Jung Ji-woo	Happy End
3rd	2000	Bong Joon-ho	Barking Dogs Never Bite
4th	2001	Song Il-gon	Flower Island
4th	2001	Jeong Jae-eun	Take Care of My Cat
5th	2002	Park Jin-pyo	Too Young to Die
6th	2003	Jang Joon-hwan	Save the Green Planet!
7th	2004	Choi Dong-hoon	The Big Swindle
8th	2005	Jeong Yoon-cheol	Marathon
9th	2006	Son Jae-gon	My Scary Girl
10th	2007	Jung Beom-sik, Jung Sik	Epitaph
11th	2008	Na Hong-jin	The Chaser
12th	2009	Ounie Lecomte	A Brand New Life
13th	2010	Jang Cheol-soo	Bedevilled
14th	2014	Yang Woo-suk	The Attorney
15th	2015	Kim Sung-je	Minority Opinion
16th	2016	Jang Jae-hyun	The Priests
17th	2017	Cho Hyun-hoon	Jane
18th	2018	Kang Yun-seong	The Outlaws
19th	2019	Kim Bora	House of Hummingbird
20th	2022	Hong Eui-jeong	Voice of Silence
21st	2023	Ahn Tae-jin	The Night Owl
22nd	2024	Jason Yu (Yu Jae-sun)	Sleep
23rd	2025	Nam Dong-hyeop	Handsome Guys
24th	2026	Jang Seong-ho	The King of Kings

=== Best New Actor ===
#	Year	Actor	Film
3rd	2000	Shin Ha-kyun	Joint Security Area
4th	2001	Kim Myung-min	Sorum
5th	2002	Hwang Jung-min	Road Movie
6th	2003	Bong Tae-gyu	A Good Lawyer's Wife
6th	2003	Park Hae-il	Jealousy Is My Middle Name
7th	2004	Gang Dong-won	Too Beautiful to Lie
8th	2005	Ha Jung-woo	The Unforgiven
9th	2006	Ryu Deok-hwan	Like a Virgin
10th	2007	Jang Keun-suk	The Happy Life
11th	2008	Yoo Ah-in	Antique
12th	2009	Kim Dong-wook	Take Off
13th	2010	Song Sae-byeok	The Servant
14th	2014	Yeo Jin-goo	Hwayi: A Monster Boy
15th	2015	Ahn Jae-hong	The King of Jokgu
16th	2016	Park Jeong-min	Dongju: The Portrait of a Poet
17th	2017	Choi Gwi-hwa	A Taxi Driver
18th	2018	Do Kyung-soo	Along with the Gods: The Last 49 Days
19th	2019	Park Myung-hoon	Parasite
20th	2022	Koo Kyo-hwan	Peninsula
21st	2023	Seo Hyun-woo	Decision to Leave
22nd	2024	Hong Xa-bin	Hopeless
23rd	2025	Lee Do-hyun	Exhuma
24th	2026	Park Ji-hoon	The King's Warden

=== Best New Actress ===
#	Year	Actress	Film
3rd	2000	Bae Doona	Plum Blossom
4th	2001	Lee Yo-won	Take Care of My Cat
5th	2002	Moon So-ri	Oasis
6th	2003	Im Soo-jung	A Tale of Two Sisters
7th	2004	Soo Ae	A Family
8th	2005	Jo Yi-jin	The Aggressives
9th	2006	Choo Ja-hyun	Bloody Tie
10th	2007	Hwang Bo-ra	Skeletons in the Closet
11th	2008	Seo Woo	Crush and Blush
12th	2009	Park Bo-young	Scandal Makers
13th	2010	Lee Min-jung	Cyrano Agency
14th	2014	Chun Woo-hee	Han Gong-ju
15th	2015	Esom	Scarlet Innocence
16th	2016	Kim Tae-ri	The Handmaiden
17th	2017	Choi Hee-seo	Anarchist from Colony
18th	2018	Kim Da-mi	The Witch: Part 1. The Subversion
19th	2019	Park Ji-hu	House of Hummingbird
20th	2022	Kang Mal-geum	Lucky Chan-sil
21st	2023	Yang Mal-bok	The Apartment with Two Women
22nd	2024	Kim Si-eun	Next Sohee
23rd	2025	Kim Geum-soon	Star of Ulsan
24th	2026	Yeom Hye-ran	No Other Choice

=== Vision Award of the Year ===
#	Year	Director	Film	Note
9th	2006	Leesong Hee-il	No Regret	Best Independent Film Director
10th	2007	Yoon Seong-ho	Milky Way Liberation Front	Best Independent Film Director
11th	2008	Jung Byung-gil	Action Boys	Best Independent Film Director
12th	2009	Yang Ik-june	Breathless	Best Independent Film Director
13th	2010	Hong Hyung-sook	The Border City 2	Best Independent Film Director
14th	2014	Lee Su-jin	Han Gong-ju	Best Independent Film Director
15th	2015	Woo Moon-gi	The King of Jokgu	Best Independent Film Director
16th	2016	Ahn Gooc-jin	Alice in Earnestland	Best Independent Film Director
17th	2017	Choi Seung-ho	Criminal Conspiracy	Best Independent Film Director
18th	2018	Kim Ui-seok	After My Death	
19th	2019	Kim Bora	House of Hummingbird	
20th	2022	Kim Cho-hee	Lucky Chan-sil	
20th	2022	Yoon Dan-bi	Moving On	
21st	2023	Kim Se-in	The Apartment with Two Women	
22nd	2024	Jung Joo-ri	Next Sohee	
23rd	2025	Oh Jung-min	House of the Seasons	
24th	2026	Yoon Ga-eun	The World of Love	

=== International Film Director of the Year ===
#	Year	Director	Film
20th	2022	Denis Villeneuve	Dune
21st	2023	Daniel Kwan, Daniel Scheinert	Everything Everywhere All at Once

=== Best Producer ===
#	Year	Producer	Film
1st	1998	Lee Choon-yeon (Cine2000)	Whispering Corridors, Art Museum by the Zoo
2nd	1999	Kim Mi-hee (Fun & Happiness Film)	Attack the Gas Station
3rd	2000	Shim Jae-myung (Myung Films)	Joint Security Area
4th	2001	Oh Ki-min (Masulpiri Pictures)	Take Care of My Cat
5th	2002	Kang Woo-suk (Cinema Service)	Chi-hwa-seon, Jail Breakers
6th	2003	Cha Seung-jae (Sidus)	Memories of Murder
6th	2003	Shim Jae-myung (Myung Films)	A Good Lawyer's Wife
7th	2004	Kim Dong-joo (ShowEast)	Oldboy
8th	2005	Oh Jeong-wan, Eugene Lee	You Are My Sunshine
9th	2006	Choi Yong-bae (Cheongeoram)	The Host
10th	2007	Kim Jong-won (KINO2)	Beyond the Years
11th	2008	Park Chan-wook (Moho Films)	Crush and Blush
11th	2008	Kim Ki-duk (Kim Ki-duk Film)	Rough Cut
12th	2009	Yoon Je-kyoon (JK Films)	Haeundae
13th	2010	Lee Tae-heon (Opus Pictures)	The Man from Nowhere
14th	2014	Choi Jae-won (withUs Film)	The Attorney
15th	2015	Shim Jae-myung (Myung Films)	Cart, Revivre
16th	2016	Shin Yeon-shick	Dongju: The Portrait of a Poet

== Series ==
=== Best Director ===
#	Year	Director	Series
20th	2022	Hwang Dong-hyuk	Squid Game
21st	2023	Yoon Jong-bin	Narco-Saints
22nd	2024	Kim Yong-hoon	Mask Girl
23rd	2025	Lee Chang-hee	A Killer Paradox
24th	2026	Kang Yun-seong	Low Life

=== Best Actor ===
#	Year	Actor	Series
20th	2022	Koo Kyo-hwan	D.P.
21st	2023	Jo Woo-jin	Narco-Saints
22nd	2024	Ahn Jae-hong	Mask Girl
23rd	2025	Lee Hee-joon	A Killer Paradox
24th	2026	Hyun Bin	Made in Korea

=== Best Actress ===
#	Year	Actress	Series
20th	2022	HoYeon Jung	Squid Game
21st	2023	Bae Suzy	Anna
22nd	2024	Yeom Hye-ran	Mask Girl
23rd	2025	Bae Doona	Family Matters
24th	2026	Im Soo-jung	Low Life

=== Best New Actor ===
#	Year	Actor	Series
20th	2022	Cho Hyun-chul	D.P.
21st	2023	Kim Min-gwi	Narco-Saints
22nd	2024	Moon Sang-hoon	D.P. 2
23rd	2025	Kim Yo-han	A Killer Paradox
24th	2026	Jung Yun-ho	Low Life

=== Best New Actress ===
#	Year	Actress	Series
20th	2022	Kim Shin-rok	Hellbound
21st	2023	Park Ye-young	Anna
22nd	2024	Lee Han-byeol	Mask Girl
23rd	2025	Moon Geun-young	Hellbound 2
24th	2026	Bang Hyo-rin	Aema

=== Best Screenplay ===
#	Year	Screenwriter	Series
20th	2022	Hwang Dong-hyuk	Squid Game
21st	2023	Yoon Jong-bin	Narco-Saints

== Special awards ==
#	Year	Category	Recipient
2nd	1999	Film Artist of the Year	Ahn Sung-ki
2nd	1999	Film Artist of the Year	Kang Je-gyu
2nd	1999	Film Artist of the Year	Yang Ki-hwan
3rd	2000	Cinematographer of the Year	Kim Seong-bok, Lim Jae-young (Joint Security Area)
3rd	2000	Expert of the Year	Jung Doo-hong
4th	2001	Film of the Year	Failan
4th	2001	Film of the Year	Friend
6th	2003	Film Artist of the Year	Ahn Sung-ki
7th	2004	Film Artist of the Year	Kim Ki-duk
7th	2004	Film Artist of the Year	Park Chan-wook
8th	2005	Special Acting Award	Lee Eun-ju
9th	2006	Film Artist of the Year	Lee Choon-yeon (영화인회 이사장)
10th	2007	Directors' Choice for Best Director	Im Kwon-taek
12th	2009	Memorial Award	Jang Jin-young
17th	2017	Genre Award	Yeon Sang-ho (Train to Busan)
17th	2017	Special Mention of the Year	Kim Hyun-seok (I Can Speak)
17th	2017	Special Mention of the Year	Lee Joon-ik (Anarchist from Colony)
17th	2017	Special Mention of the Year	Jang Hoon (A Taxi Driver)
17th	2017	Special Mention of the Year	Kim Jee-woon (The Age of Shadows)
17th	2017	Special Mention of the Year	Han Jae-rim (The King)
17th	2017	Special Mention of the Year	Choi Seung-ho (Criminal Conspiracy)
18th	2018	Special Mention of the Year	Lee Chang-dong (Burning)
18th	2018	Special Mention of the Year	Hwang Dong-hyuk (The Fortress)
18th	2018	Special Mention of the Year	Yim Soon-rye (Little Forest)
18th	2018	Special Mention of the Year	Yoon Jong-bin (The Spy Gone North)
18th	2018	Special Mention of the Year	Min Kyu-dong (Herstory)
18th	2018	Special Mention of the Year	Jang Joon-hwan (1987: When the Day Comes)
20th	2022	Lifetime Achievement Award	Lee Hyun-seung
20th	2022	Special Friend Award	Ryoo Seung-wan
