= Narco-Saints =

2022 South Korean Netflix series

- Promotional poster
- Also known as: The Accidental Narco
- Hangul: 수리남
- Lit.: Suriname
- RR: Surinam
- MR: Surinam
- Genre: Thriller; Crime
- Created by: Netflix
- Inspired by: Narcos by: Chris Brancato; Carlo Bernard; Doug Miro
- Written by: Yoon Jong-bin; Kwon Sung-hui
- Directed by: Yoon Jong-bin
- Starring: Ha Jung-woo; Hwang Jung-min; Park Hae-soo; Jo Woo-jin; Yoo Yeon-seok; Chang Chen
- Music by: Jo Yeong-wook
- Country of origin: South Korea
- Original language: Korean (Note: With some dialogue in English and Mandarin Chinese)
- No. of episodes: 6

Production
- Producers: Kang Myung-chan; Koo Soo-ran
- Production locations: South Korea; Dominican Republic
- Running time: 53–70 minutes
- Production companies: Moonlight Film; Perfect Storm Film Inc.
- Budget: ₩35 billion

Original release
- Network: Netflix
- Release: September 9, 2022

Narco-Saints (Korean: 수리남; lit. 'Suriname') is a 2022 South Korean television series directed and co-written by Yoon Jong-bin, and starring Ha Jung-woo, Hwang Jung-min, Park Hae-soo, Jo Woo-jin, Yoo Yeon-seok, and Chang Chen. Inspired by true story, the series depicts an ordinary entrepreneur who has no choice but to risk his life in joining the secret mission of government agents to capture a South Korean drug lord operating in Suriname. It was released on Netflix on September 9, 2022, alongside an English language dub renamed Narco-Saints, in order to draw similarities to Netflix's previous similarly premised series Narcos (2015–2017) and Narcos: Mexico (2018–2021), the "play next" of the latter series linking to Narco-Saints.

== Synopsis ==
The life-threatening journey of Kang In-gu (Ha Jung-woo), a civilian businessman who has no choice but to cooperate with the secret operation of the National Intelligence Service to catch Jeon Yo-hwan (Hwang Jung-min), a South Korean drug lord who has taken control of Suriname.

== Cast ==
=== Main ===
- Ha Jung-woo as Kang In-gu

A businessman who arrived in Suriname for skate business, only to be forcefully pulled in by the National Intelligence Service for a secret operation to catch Yo-hwan.

- Hwang Jung-min as Jeon Yo-hwan

A Korean drug lord currently based in Suriname, acting as a pastor.

- Park Hae-soo as Choi Chang-ho

The team leader of the National Intelligence Service's Branch in the Americas.

- Jo Woo-jin as Byeon Ki-tae

The right-hand man of Yo-hwan; he was formerly under the Chinese organisation before betraying to work for Yo-hwan.

- Yoo Yeon-seok as David Julio Park

The consultant lawyer for Yo-hwan.He also assist Yo Hwan in Drug Dealing Business.

- Chang Chen as Chen Zhen

A Chinese gang leader based in Chinatown, Paramaribo.

=== Supporting ===
- Choo Ja-hyun as Park Hye-jin

In-gu's wife.

- Jordan Preston as President Delano Alvarez

The President of Suriname who came to power after conducting a military coup with the help of Yo-hwan.

- Bryan Larkin as DEA Chief

He works closely with Chang-ho to arrest Yo-hwan.

- Lee Bong-ryun as Deaconess Jung

Yo-hwan's church figure, she is cruel like him.

- Kim Min-gwi as Lee Sang-jun

A deacon and close aide of Yo-hwan.

- Go Geon-han as Dong-woo

Member of the National Intelligence Service and Chang-ho's assistant.

- Hyun Bong-sik as Park Eung-soo

In-gu's high school friend and a sailor, he suggested that In-gu goes to Suriname for skate business.

- Kim Ye-won as Jeon Yo-hwan's wife

In 1993, at an investment briefing headed by Yo-hwan, she disclosed false information regarding Yo-hwan having connections to the president to millionaires.

- Kim Si-hyeon as Si-hyeon

Chang-ho's assistant.

- Chidi Ajufo as Gallas
- Anupam Tripathi as a soldier of the Surinamese Army
- Song Ho-bum as Chen Zhen's underling
- Lee Sung-min as The voice of a fishing boat captain
- Nubel Feliz Yan as Nubel The Mercenary 2

== Episodes ==
No.	Episode	Directed by	Written by	Original release date
1	"Episode 1"	Yoon Jong-bin	Kwon Sung-hui, Yoon Jong-bin	September 22, 2022
Kang In-gu, the main character, suffers from bad forces while doing business in Suriname. Then, some Surinamese pastor says he can help him.
2	"Episode 2"	Yoon Jong-bin	Kwon Sung-hui, Yoon Jong-bin	September 22, 2022
Kang In-gu grows his influence in prison, following the instructions of a secret agent.
3	"Episode 3"	Yoon Jong-bin	Kwon Sung-hui, Yoon Jong-bin	September 22, 2022
After Jeon Yo-hwan's investigation, Koo Sang-man and Jeon Yo-hwan start trading.
4	"Episode 4"	Yoon Jong-bin	Kwon Sung-hui, Yoon Jong-bin	September 22, 2022
When the route to South Korea was blocked by the military, Sangman suggests another route.
5	"Episode 5"	Yoon Jong-bin	Kwon Sung-hui, Yoon Jong-bin	September 22, 2022
Kang In-gu fails to persuade pastor Jeon; So In-gu and Koo Sang-man get a new plan.
6	"Episode 6"	Yoon Jong-bin	Kwon Sung-hui, Yoon Jong-bin	September 22, 2022
Everything is going as planned, but the pastor makes an unexpected action. So a rescue plan is launched to save Kang In-gu who is left in Suriname.

== Production ==
=== Casting ===
On March 23, 2021, the cast of K-drama Suriname, inspired by Netflix's Narcos, was announced to include Jo Woo-jin, Yoo Yeon-seok, Park Hae-soo, and Choo Ja-hyun, in addition to Ha Jung-woo and Hwang Jung-min, who had already been confirmed as the lead roles. The first script reading of the cast was held on March 22, 2021, at a location in Seoul.

=== Filming ===
Production of Suriname planned to be filmed at Dominican Republic from April last year, due to COVID-19 pandemic, the production was postponed indefinitely. Later, production started filming on a set in South Korea from last April and decided to shoot in Dominican Republic, not in Suriname, for about two months starting in November.

On November 9, 2021, it was reported that actors and staffs of Suriname departed to Dominican Republic from the end of October and plans return to Korea in mid-December. Yoo Yeon-seok recently returned to Korea in the end of October, Hwang Jung-min and Ha Jung-woo departed to Dominican Republic in late October and early November. Jo Woo-jin is scheduled to leave the country soon. This story background location will not resemble the Surinamese country.

The series was produced with an estimated cost of ₩35 billion.

== Reception ==
=== Critical response ===
On the review aggregator website Rotten Tomatoes, 71% of 7 critics' reviews are positive, with an average rating of 6.8/10.

=== Accolades ===
Name of the award ceremony, year presented, category, nominee(s) of the award, and the result of the nomination
Award ceremony	Year	Category	Nominee / Work	Result	Ref.
Asian Academy Creative Awards	2023	Best Actor in A Leading Role (National Winners – Korea)	Ha Jung-woo	Won	
Asian Academy Creative Awards	2023	Best Actor in A Supporting Role (National Winners – Korea)	Jo Woo-jin	Won	
Asian Academy Creative Awards	2023	Best Direction – Fiction (National Winners – Korea)	Yoon Jong-bin	Won	
Baeksang Arts Awards	2023	Best Supporting Actor	Jo Woo-jin	Won	
Director's Cut Awards	2023	Best Director in Television	Yoon Jong-bin	Won	
Director's Cut Awards	2023	Best Screenplay	Yoon Jong-bin, Kwon Seong-hwi	Won	
Director's Cut Awards	2023	Best Actor in Television	Jo Woo-jin	Won	
Director's Cut Awards	2023	Best New Actor in Television	Kim Min-gwi	Won	
Director's Cut Awards	2023	Best Actor in Television	Ha Jung-woo	Nominated	
Director's Cut Awards	2023	Best Actor in Television	Park Hae-soo	Nominated	
Director's Cut Awards	2023	Best Actor in Television	Hwang Jung-min	Nominated	
Korea Drama Awards	2022	Grand Prize (Daesang)	Ha Jung-woo	Won	

=== Controversy ===
Suriname's government has taken legal action against the production company for allegedly damaging Suriname's image by featuring drugs in the series. Suriname's government, which takes legal action with just one drama, also said it would lodge a protest with the South Korean government. Specifically, the series showed a corrupt president, as well as a drug scene. However, as national issues made a choice.

On September 13, 2022, the Minister of Foreign Affairs of Suriname expressed his displeasure about the Netflix original series, saying, "Suriname has been portrayed as a drug-transfer country for many years. We are working to improve the image. But we are at a disadvantage again with Netflix's 'Suriname' isn't just foreshadowing legal action against producers." He also announced that he would send an anti-job protest letter to the US ambassador in Suriname. A senior government official in Suriname went public about the job and expressed his discomfort. The interest in Netflix's response was consolidated. Later, Ahn Eun-joo, deputy spokesperson for the Ministry of Foreign Affairs announced "If there is a misunderstanding, try to resolve it". In the end, it even showed signs of turning into a diplomatic issue. The Embassy of South Korea in Venezuela asserted that it was concerned about the safety of local residents in Suriname.
