= Zone =

Zone, Zones or The Zone may refer to:

== Places ==
=== Military zones ===
- Zone, any of the divisions of France during the World War II German occupation
- Zone, any of the divisions of Germany during the post-World War II Allied occupation
- Korean Demilitarized Zone

=== Place names ===
- Zone (colony) (Ζώνη), an ancient Greek city
- Zone, Lombardy, a comune in the province of Brescia
- Zones of Nepal, any of several administrative divisions
- Administrative divisions of India, known as Zones
- Capitol Hill Autonomous Zone ("The Zone") a June/July 2020 occupation protest site in Seattle, Washington
- List of zones of Ethiopia, any of several administrative divisions
- The Zone (die Zone in German), a derogatory term for the former East Germany
- Zone of alienation ("The Zone"), the exclusion zone surrounding the Chernobyl disaster site

== Apparel ==
- Zone (vestment), a belt worn by priests and bishops of the Eastern Orthodox Church
- Zone, a girdle worn by a woman around the waist

== Arts, entertainment, and media ==
=== Films ===
- The Zone (2003 film), a Swedish short documentary
- The Zone (2011 film), an American thriller
- Zone (2012 film), a Finnish independent film
- Zone (1995 film), a Japanese experimental short film
- Transformers: Zone, a 1990 original video animation

=== Games ===
- Zone (video games), an area within a virtual environment
- Zone.com, alternate name for MSN Games
- Zones, level names in early Sonic the Hedgehog games

=== Literature ===
- Zone (magazine), a former Argentina-based forum for international poetry and prose
- Zone (play), a 1953 French language play by Canadian Marcel Dubé
- Zones (novel), 1997, by Damien Broderick and Rorey Barns
- "Zone", a poem by Guillaume Apollinaire

=== Music ===
==== Groups and labels ====
- Zone (band), an all-female J-pop group
- Zones (band), a British punk band
- Zone Records, a record label

==== Albums ====
- Zone, 1996 album by Southern Sons
- Zone (TVXQ album), 2024
- Zone (Cloud Control album), 2017
- The Zone (Enter Shikari album), 2007
- The Zone (Paul Rutherford, Torsten Müller, and Harris Eisenstadt album), 2006
- Zones (album), 1983, by Hawkwind
- Zone (EP), 2023, by Jihyo

==== Songs ====
- "The Zone" (song), 2011, by The Weeknd
- "Zone", a 1976 single by The Rhythm Makers
- "Zone", a 2019 single by Arizona Zervas
- "Zone", a bonus track on the 2017 album Floral Shoppe by Macintosh Plus

=== Television ===
- The Zone (Australian TV program), a 1990s video games news and reviews show
- The Zone (British game show), a 2007 interactive game show
- The Zone (New Zealand TV channel) (2014–2017)
- The Zone (ITV), a British teleshopping and interactive gaming TV channel
- The Zone (YTV), a Canadian television programming block

=== Other uses in arts, entertainment, and media ===
- 1280 The Zone, the branding of the American radio station KZNS (AM)
- The Zone, a fictional area in the 1979 Andrei Tarkovsky movie Stalker

== Computing ==
- DNS zone, a portion of a computer network namespace
- Solaris Zones, a virtualization feature of the Solaris operating system
- Zone, a region in region-based memory management

== Science and technology ==
- Zone (convex polytope), in model checking, a type of difference bound matrix
- Thermal zone, or just zone, in heating, ventilating, and air conditioning (HVAC)
- Zone System, a photographic technique for determining optimal film exposure and development

== Other uses ==
- Zone (surname)
- Zone (guitar), a Fender bass guitar model
- Zone, a short name for DVD region code
- Zones (permaculture), a method of planning civil and agricultural placement
- Zone defense, in team sports
- Da share z0ne, a satirical social media account
- Flow (psychology), or "the zone", a mental state attained by a person fully immersed in some activity
- Time zone
- Zone pricing, based on the location of the buyer
- Zoning, in urban planning, a system of land-use regulation

== See also ==
- Zoning (disambiguation)
- AutoZone
- TheZone, summer camp of Oorah
- Combat Zone (disambiguation)
- Danger Zone (disambiguation)
- In the Zone (disambiguation)
- La Zona (disambiguation)
- Twilight zone
- Zon (disambiguation)
- Region (mathematics)
- ZoneAlarm
