= Zon =

Zon may refer to:

- Zon (name)
- Zon (band), Canadian progressive rock band
- Zon Guitars, American manufacturer of bass guitars
- NOS (Portuguese company), former names ZON Multimédia and ZON Optimus
- Zon, Burkina Faso, town in northern Burkina Faso
- Żoń, village in Poland
- Uchat-Zon, village in Perm Krai, Russia

== See also ==
- Zoon (disambiguation)
- Zohn
- Zonn (disambiguation)
- Zone (disambiguation)
