= Zone (TVXQ album) =

- Standard edition cover

Studio album by Tohoshinki
- Released: November 6, 2024
- Recorded: 2023–24
- Genre: J-pop; dance-pop
- Language: Japanese
- Label: Avex Trax
- Producer: Shinjiroh Inoue; Hi-yunk; Waveshower; Pizzapunk; Lovelypop; Pixelwave; Cage; Ludwig Lindell; Daiki Ueno; Tasuku; Bangers&Ca$h; Yoichiro Kakizaki; Joakim Dalqvist; Katsuki Yamamoto; Esme Mori; Tasuku Maeda; Caesar & Loui; RHeaT; SUA; Kei Kawano

Tohoshinki chronology
20&2 (2023)	Zone (2024)

Singles from Zone
- 1. "Utsuroi" Released: July 31, 2022; 2. "Parallel Parallel" Released: January 31, 2023; 3. "Lime & Lemon" Released: June 12, 2023; 4. "Sweet Surrender" Released: October 7, 2024; 5. "Dearest" Released: October 28, 2024

Zone is the eleventh Japanese studio album by South Korean pop duo Tohoshinki, released on November 6, 2024, by Avex Trax. The album was released to commemorate the duo's twentieth debut anniversary in Japan, which falls on April 27, 2025. The duo will embark on a nation-wide arena live tour, titled the 20th Anniversary Live Tour: Zone, which starts in Saitama at the Saitama Super Arena on November 29, 2024.

Zone debuted at number five on the Oricon Albums Chart, number four on the Billboard Japan Hot Albums Chart, and number one on the Billboard Japan Download Albums Chart.

== Background ==
On December 26, 2023, Tohoshinki celebrated their 20th debut anniversary in Korea with the release of their ninth Korean album 20&2 (2023). On April 27, 2024, the day of the duo's 19th debut anniversary in Japan, they announced that they will embark on a nation-wide arena tour between November 2024 and March 2025, to commemorate their 20th anniversary. Ticket lottery reservations for the tour started June 2024.

On July 19, Tohoshinki revealed their 20th anniversary album Zone, subsequently confirming the name of the tour. Zone is scheduled to be printed in four different versions: a DVD version which consists of 20 tracks and a bonus track; a Blu-ray version with the same package; a CD-only version with a different bonus track; a fanclub-exclusive Bigeast edition with another bonus track; and a first press limited "super deluxe" edition, an LP-size box which includes all three bonus tracks with three photobooks.

== Release and promotion ==
On September 4, Tohoshinki teased "Damn Good", a new track from the album that was announced to be a tie-up song for their collaboration with the Korean ginseng brand, Cheong Kwan Jang. From September 21 to 22, previews of the thirteen new tracks from Zone were teased through their official X account, confirming the album's tracklist. "Sweet Surrender" was subsequently announced to be the album's lead single. A finalized tracklist of the second CD, which included interlude tracks, was further revealed on September 28.

A teaser for "Sweet Surrender" dropped on October 6, with the music video premiering on October 7, 2024, at 6 PM JST on YouTube. The single was also released on October 7. After the video premiered, Tohoshinki debuted their first live performance of "Sweet Surrender" on the TBS music program CDTV! Live Live.

The album's official special website was launched on October 12, in support of the album's promotions. The website included details of the album's contents, order benefits, as well as information about signing events. From October 19 through 27, Tohoshinki revealed more promotional images from the album, culminating to the release of Zone's second lead single "Dearest" on October 28.

The number "20" is alluded throughout the album, in reference to Tohoshinki's twentieth debut anniversary. In addition to having 20 tracks in the album, the number "20" is also hidden in the title of Zone. The theme of the album surrounds the discussion between AI and human intelligence, and how despite living in a world where technology has become more advanced, it is important to maintain rooted to humanity. The album starts off with the intro track "Eternal Echoes," which has unintelligible lyrics. Created by AI, the song consists of reversed vocals from the song "Magenta", the first track in Tohoshinki's first album as a duo, Tone (2011). Zone's second track "T.R.H.M" stands for "The Regain Humanity Method", a song about surviving in an ever-changing future and a battle to regain control of humanity. A special website, theregainhumanitymethod.net, dropped on the day of the album's release, and was unlocked by a special password revealed on November 29, 2024, the first day of their Japan-wide live tou.

== Commercial performance ==
Zone debuted at number three on the daily Oricon Albums Chart on the first day of release, selling 23,980 physical copies. It sold 43,095 copies in the first week, entering the weekly Oricon Albums Chart at number five. It debuted at number one on the Oricon Digital Albums Chart, with 1,944 downloads. For Billboard Japan, Zone debuted at number five on the Top Albums Sales chart, selling 44,105 copies. On the second week, Zone dropped to number fifteen per the Oricon Albums Chart, selling 4,282 copies.

== Track listing ==
Zone track listing
No.	Title	Writer(s)	Producer(s)	Length
1.	"Introduction (Eternal Echoes)"	Shinjiroh Inoue	Shinjiroh Inoue	2:04
2.	"T.R.H.M"	Hi-yunk (Back-On)	Hi-yunk	3:23
3.	"On My Radar"	Sean Alexander; Waveshower; Val Del Prete; Sqvare	Waveshower	3:06
4.	"Party Like Madonna"	Julia Bognar Finnseter; Adrian Thesen; Paulos Solbø; Benjamin Sahba; Sverre C. Sunde; Kyle Wong; Nermin Harambasic	Pizzapunk; Lovelypop	3:11
5.	"Sweet Surrender"	Pixelwave; Ella Isaacson; Emily Kim	Pixelwave	2:53
6.	"Parfum"	Ludwig Lindell; Karl-Oskar Gummesson; GC-JR	Lindell; Cage	3:09
7.	"Fresh"	Jonathan B-T; Harambasic; Sahba; Sunde; Wong	Lovelypop	2:42
8.	"Umaku Iezu ni Gomen ne (うまく言えずにごめんね)" (I'm sorry I couldn't express it well)	Daiki Ueno	Tasuku	5:03
9.	"Live Your Life"	Fabian "Phat Febe" Torrson; Martin Mulholland; Harambasic; Harry Sommerdahl	Bangers&Ca$h	3:12
10.	"It's True It's Here"	Kiyoto Konda	Yoichiro Yakizaki	4:44
11.	"Damn Good"	Robin Stjernberg	Stjernberg	3:33
12.	"Ark"	Joakim Dalqvist; Simon Peyron	Dalqvist	2:59
13.	"Dearest"	Inoue	Inoue	4:06
14.	"Utsuroi"	Katsuhiko Yamamoto	Esme Mori; Yamamoto	4:02
15.	"The Reflex"	Hi-yunk	Hi-yunk	3:33
16.	"Parallel Parallel"	Alexander Karlsson; Alexei Viktorovitch	Tasuku Maeda; Akira	3:33
17.	"No Sympathy"	Henrik Nordenback; Christian Fast; Jimmy Claeson	Hide Kawada; Nordenback	3:09
18.	"Lime & Lemon"	Caesar & Loui	Caesar & Loui	3:06
19.	"Sentimental Mood"	Sofia Vivere; Elias Oberg; SUA (153/Joombas); RHeaT (153/Joombas)	SUA; RHeaT	2:54
20.	"Forever Love" (Zone version)	Ichiro Fujitani	Kei Kawano	6:01
Total length:				60:10

Zone first press limited super deluxe edition bonus tracks (Disc 2: The Regain Humanity Method)
No.	Title	Writer(s)	Producer(s)	Length
11.	"Rebel" (Japanese version)	Jonatan Gusmark; Ludvig Evers; Moa "Cazzi Opeia" Carlebecker; Adrian McKinnon; Kenzie	Moonshine; Kenzie
12.	"Down" (Japanese version)	Rokman; Benji Bae; Pablo Andreu; Pixelwave	Rokman; Bae; Lockhome; Pixelwave
13.	"Stand by U" (Zone version)	UTA; REO	UTA

== Personnel ==
Musicians

- Tohoshinki – vocals and background vocals (all tracks)
- Shinjiroh Inoue – synthesizer (track 1
- Hi-yunk (Back-On) – guitar (track 2), background vocals (track 2)
- Hiromi Narita – background vocals (track 3)
- Yuho Yoshioka – background vocals (track 4)
- Issei – background vocals (track 5)
- Tasuku – guitar (track 8)
- Kazuhiro Murase – brass, saxophone (track 10)
- Yoichiro Kakizaki – keyboards (track 10)
- Kiyoto Konda – guitar (track 10)
- Kazuhiro Sunaga – bass (track 10)
- Masao Fukunaga – percussion (track 10)
- Yusuke Nakano – trumpet (track 10)
- Teppei Kawakami – trumpet (track 10)
- Hiroyuki Suka – trombone (track 10)
- Mio Abe Strings – strings (track 10)
- Udai Shika Strings – strings (track 13)
- Kei Kawano – keyboards (track 20)
- Kazuya Oi – drums (track 20)
- Yohei Makabe – guitar (track 20)
- Atsuki Yoshida Strings – strings (track 20)

== Charts ==
=== Weekly charts ===
Weekly chart performance for Zone
Chart (2024)	Peak position
Japanese Albums (Oricon)	5
Japanese Combined Albums (Oricon)	5
Japanese Hot Albums (Billboard Japan)	4

=== Monthly charts ===
Monthly chart performance for Zone
Chart (2024)	Position
Japanese Albums (Oricon)	11

== Sales ==
Released	Oricon chart	Peak	Debut sales	Sales total
November 6, 2024
November 6, 2024	Daily Albums Chart	3	23,980	50,459
November 6, 2024	Weekly Albums Chart	5	43,095	50,459
November 6, 2024	Monthly Albums Chart (November)	TBA	TBA	50,459

== Release history ==
Release dates and formats for Zone
Region	Date	Format(s)	Label	Ref.
Various	November 6, 2024	CD; DVD; Blu-ray; digital download; streaming	Avex Trax	
