= Bausa =

Bausa is a surname. Notable people with the surname include:

- Bausa (rapper) (born 1989), German rapper and singer
- Agostino Bausa (1821–1899), Italian cardinal of the Roman Catholic Church
- Gregorio Bausá (1590–1656), Spanish painter of the Baroque period

== See also ==
- The Bausa, a Norwegian pop group who had an international hit in 2026 with the song "Magnetic"
