= Spacy =

Spacy may refer to:

- Spacy (film), a 1981 experimental short film
- spaCy, an open-source software library for advanced natural language processing
- U.N. Spacy, a fictional space military force in the Macross anime franchise

== See also ==
- Spacey (disambiguation)
