= Takashi Ito (director) =

Japanese experimental filmmaker

- Born: 1956 (age 69–70); Fukuoka, Japan
- Education: Kyushu Institute of Design
- Occupations: Film director; photographer; arts professor
- Years active: 1977–present

Takashi Ito (伊藤高志, Itō Takashi; born 1956) is a Japanese experimental filmmaker known for his avant-garde short films, including Spacy (1981), Thunder (1982), and Ghost (1984). His films are characterized by such photographic techniques as long-exposure and time-lapse photography, as well as a stop motion technique in which series of photographs are themselves photographed frame-by-frame, creating an animated effect.

Ito's filmmaking style and interest in experimental film were influenced by his mentor Toshio Matsumoto, under whom Ito learned while a student at the Kyushu Institute of Design. Matsumoto's 1975 experimental short Ātman influenced Ito to create Noh (1977), an 8 mm short. Ito's first 16 mm short, Spacy, was completed in 1981. Spacy screened at several museums in and outside of Japan, as well as international film festivals and universities. Over the course of his career, Ito has directed a total of over 20 short films, a number of which have been shown at film festivals and as part of retrospective exhibitions on Ito's filmography.

Ito's debut feature-length film, Toward Zero, premiered at the 2021 Image Forum Festival, and received a theatrical release in Japan in August 2022.

== Early life and education ==
Takashi Ito was born in 1956 in Fukuoka, Japan, as the second son of his mother, a nurse, and his father, a journalist and fan of film. As a child, Ito watched anime produced by Toei Animation, as well as Disney animated films, but was disallowed by his father from seeing kaiju films like those in the Godzilla series. After being repeatedly asked by Ito, his father eventually acquiesced to letting him attend a double feature of the kaiju films Daimajin and Gamera vs. Barugon; he later recalled that his resulting elation worried his parents. Ito also enjoyed drawing manga, both copying and creating original stories based on works by such artists as Shotaro Ishinomori, Osamu Tezuka, and Mitsuteru Yokoyama. Between 6th grade and junior high school, Ito created a monster-themed manga titled Battle.

At age 18, Ito experienced a stomach rupture and was sent to a hospital to undergo an emergency operation. Following the procedure, one of the doctors reportedly told him that, had he arrived three hours later than he did, he would have died. Two years after graduating from senior high school, Ito enrolled at the Kyushu Institute of Design. There, he joined the film research club, photography club, and basketball club, and borrowed an 8 mm film camera from his relatives, which he began using to create short films. He attended an exhibition showcasing works by filmmaker Toshio Matsumoto; upon viewing Matsumoto's 1975 experimental short Ātman at the exhibition, Ito thought, "I want to make a movie like this." When he learned that Matsumoto was coming to work at the university, Ito abandoned plans to get an immediate job and decided to stay enrolled in the school.

== Career ==
=== 1977–1981: Noh, Movement trilogy, and Spacy ===
One of Ito's earliest film works is Noh (1977), which was shot on 8 mm and features photographs of Noh masks against different landscapes; Noh was particularly inspired by Ātman.

Noh was followed by a trilogy of 8 mm short films: Movement (1978), Movement 2 (1979), and Movement 3 (1980). Ito described Movement 3 as a prototype for his 1981 film Spacy, which he made while a student at the Kyushu Institute of Design, with Matsumoto offering guidance as a mentor. Ito's first film to be shot in 16 mm, and consisting of 700 continuous still photographs, Spacy is set entirely within a gymnasium, with multiple easels positioned around the space. On each of the easels is a photograph of the gymnasium itself. Through the use of a stop motion technique, the camera appears to glide around the room in varying patterns and enter the photographs on the easels, creating a recursive, seemingly endless visual effect.

In 1982, Spacy screened at the Hyōgo Prefectural Museum of Art in Japan and the Musée d'Art Moderne de Paris in France. It went on to be shown at the Hong Kong International Film Festival and the Museum of Modern Art, Toyama, in 1983, followed by a screening at the Edinburgh International Film Festival in 1984. According to fellow experimental filmmaker Nobuhiro Kawanaka, Spacy received considerable applause when it screened at Osnabrück University in West Germany in 1984. Following a later screening at the University of Würzburg, Kawanaka recalled, a hat was passed around the audience that eventually filled with a "mountain" of banknotes and coins.

=== 1980s: Thunder, Ghost, Grim and other shorts ===
"Film is capable of presenting a fictional world as a vivid reality and creating a strange space that belongs only to this medium. My overriding intention is to alter scenes of everyday life and draw the audience (myself) into the vortex of supernatural illusion by using the magic of cinema."

— Ito, in an October 1984 interview with Image Forum.

Ito would continue to hone his own distinct style in his following work, such as Box, Thunder, Screw (all 1982), Drill (1983), Ghost (1984), and Grim (1985). These films incorporate use of stop motion, pixilation, time-lapse, and long exposure photography.

For Box, Ito pasted landscape photographs onto the faces of a cube, of which he then took frame-by-frame photos. In the finished film, the box appears to revolve seemingly endlessly, but in fact, only rotates 90 degrees. Box was shown at the Young Japanese Cinema festival in London, England, in 1990, and at the International Film Festival Rotterdam in Rotterdam, the Netherlands, in 2000.

Thunder, Ghost, and Grim have been particularly noted for their ominous atmospheres and imagery, using light, sound design, and long-exposure and time-lapse photography to invoke the feeling of spaces haunted by ghostly presences. Thunder screened at the 34th Berlin International Film Festival in 1984, and was later shown at the Ishikawa Prefectural Museum of Art in 1996.

In 1983, Ito graduated from the Kyushu Institute of Design. After graduating, Ito joined the culture department of the flagship Seibu Department Store in Ikebukuro, Tokyo, working as a staff member in the building's Seibu Museum of Art and Studio 200; he then joined the Art Theatre Guild (ATG). He directed the short film Drill (1983), which, like Spacy and Box, utilizes a large number of photographs. Drill was shot around the entrance to the company dormitory in which Ito resided at the time. 1984 saw the release of the Ito-directed Ghost, an experiment in long-exposure photography and other techniques filmed inside his dorm; and The Crazy Family, a Sogo Ishii-directed film for which Ito supervised the special effects. That same year, Ito was assigned to the advertising department of the now-defunct Saibu Saison group.

In 1985, Ito directed Grim, yet another experimental film featuring long-exposure photography. In 1987, he directed Wall, an extended version of a 15-second advertisement that he had helped create for an interior design firm. Wall features images of a hand holding a torn photograph of a storehouse.

=== 1990s–present: Later shorts, retrospectives and Toward Zero ===
Ito continued to make experimental shorts into the 1990s and 2000s, with his output including The Moon (1994), Zone (1995), Monochrome Head (1997), Dizziness (2001), and A Silent Day (2002). In 1996, Zone was awarded a Main Prize at the International Short Film Festival in Oberhausen, Germany.

In January 2009, Ito exhibited a video installation he created titled The Dead Dance in Kyoto. On 18 December 2009, Takashi Ito Film Anthology was released on DVD, a two-disc collection containing 20 of Ito's films.

In 2010, Ito was an arts professor at Kyoto University of Art and Design. In March of that year, several of his shorts were shown at the Flatpack Film Festival in Birmingham, England. In 2015, a retrospective of Ito's filmography was exhibited at the 61st International Short Film Festival in Oberhausen.

Ito's first feature-length film, Toward Zero, premiered at the 2021 Image Forum Festival, where it received the Shuji Terayama Award. The film was theatrically released in Japan in August 2022. It was also screened as part of an exhibition held in Tokyo, in which it was followed by three programs of Ito's prior works.

In March 2022, the city of Fukuoka honored Ito with a City Culture Award.

== Filmography ==
=== Short films ===
- Noh (1977)
- Movement (1978)
- Movement 2 (1979)
- Movement 3 (1980)
- Spacy (1981)
- Box (1982)
- Thunder (1982)
- Screw (1982)
- Drill (1983)
- Ghost (1984)
- Grim (1985)
- Photodiary (1986)
- Wall (1987)
- Photodiary '87 (1987)
- Devil's Circuit (1988)
- The Mummy's Dream (1989)
- Venus (1990)
- December Hide-and-Go-Seek (1993)
- The Moon (1994)
- Zone (1995)
- Apparatus M (1996)
- Monochrome Head (1997)
- Dizziness (2001)
- Double (2001)
- A Silent Day (2002)
- Unbalance (2006)
- Tokyo Loop (2006)

=== Feature films ===
- Toward Zero (2021)
