= 20&2 =

- Digital cover

Studio album by TVXQ
- Released: December 26, 2023
- Genres: Pop; dance; R&B
- Length: 30:37
- Language: Korean
- Labels: SM; Kakao
- Producers: Kenzie; Rokman; PixelWave; Moonshine; Mike Woods; Pink Slip; Inverness; MZMC; Chief1; Thomas Troelsen; Coucheron; Cameron Warren; Trackside; Kyum Luk

TVXQ chronology
Epitaph (2022)	20&2 (2023)	Zone (2024)

Singles from 20&2
- 1. "Down" Released: December 4, 2023; 2. "Rebel" Released: December 26, 2023

20&2 is the ninth Korean studio album by South Korean duo TVXQ, released by SM Entertainment on December 26, 2023, the day of their twentieth debut anniversary in Korea. It is TVXQ's first new Korean release in five years, following the EP New Chapter No. 2: The Truth of Love in 2018. Primarily a pop record with influences of dance music and R&B, it is also characterized by fast-tempo synth-bass, mid-tempo synthesizers, disco, and guitar elements. 20&2 is described as a "diverse" album that introduces a new vision of TVXQ.

The album contains ten tracks, including the lead single "Rebel" and its pre-release single "Down". 20&2 debuted at number three on South Korea's Circle Album Chart, and peaked at number eleven on Japan's Oricon Albums Chart.

To support the album and to commemorate their twenty years of debut, the duo has embarked on the 20&2 Asia Tour from December 2023 to April 2024.

== Background and release ==
In July 2023, SM Entertainment confirmed that TVXQ were working on a new album, ending a five-year group hiatus in Korea. 20&2 and its accompanying concert tour were both officially announced on October 5, 2023. The first promotional image shared on news outlets and social media showed a series of complex designs and the constellation Cassiopeia, which is also the name of TVXQ's fanclub. 20&2 commemorates the 20th anniversary of TVXQ's formation, with the title also being a reference to the two remaining members, U-Know Yunho and Max Changmin.

On November 27, 2023, the day before TVXQ's scheduled appearance at the 2023 MAMA Awards, SM shared a series of promotional material on social media, including an image of TVXQ's new album logo. At the MAMA Awards on November 28, TVXQ performed their pre-release single "Down" for the first time, followed by their 2005 single "Rising Sun" with the boy band Riize.

The music video teaser for "Down" was unveiled on December 1, 2023, and the video dropped on December 4. On December 11, SM released a teaser trailer of the new record, which featuried Yunho and Changmin in two different landscapes–the first, depicting Yunho and Changmin as snipers aiming at sheep; the second, depicting the duo running through a snowy forest and a concrete jungle, and a voice over counting up to twenty. SM announced the following day that 20&2 will drop on December 26, 2023–the day of TVXQ's twentieth debut anniversary–at 6 pm KST. From December 13 to 21, a series of concept images from the album's photobook were released in consecutive fashion.

Previews of the album's tracklist were revealed on a "Rebel Game soundtrack" video shared by SM on December 24. The music video teaser for the album's lead single "Rebel" was revealed on December 25. "Rebel" and 20&2 were both released on December 26, with the album being available in three different packaged versions–the Vault, the Circuit, and the Photobook; and a limited special edition with only 1,226 prints available.

== Composition ==
20&2 consists of ten tracks. The first track and pre-release single "Down" is described as a "slow R&B song" with "sensual" guitar riffs and heavy synth bass, with lyrics which depict "a fierce thirst for love and a desperate yearning for the other person." The lead single "Rebel" is a dance-pop song characterized by strong drumb beats, heavy bass, and "dynamic vocals" with a "rhythmic track." The lyrics of the song encompasses the theme of the album, describing a true rebel as someone who "does not simply oppose existing ideas, but someone who pushes forward with their beliefs without wavering." Tracks three "Rodeo" and four "Jungle" are both described as "atmospheric" songs, the former reminiscent of a Western film with lyrics about not being complacent to reality, while the latter is an "aggressively vivid" hip hop song with lyrics about coming on top while being trapped in a "jungle-like" reality.

The second half of the album is characterized by light, mid-tempo pop songs, and ballads. The fifth track "Life is a Dance" is described as "cheerful" and "funky", with lyrics about experiencing life after a rough journey. The sixth track "Fix It" is a disco-style dance song performed by Yunho and featuring the rapper DinDin. The seventh track "Take My Breath Away" is a R&B ballad performed by Changmin. "Promise" is a ballad with lyrics written by Changmin; "The Way U Are" is an acoustic, unplugged remix of TVXQ's 2004 best-selling single of the same name. "Starlight", the final track in the album, is a ballad with lyrics that expresses TVXQ's "grateful and sincere" relationship with each other and their fans.

== Promotion ==
On November 28, 2023, TVXQ performed "Down" for the first time at the 2023 MAMA Awards held at the Tokyo Dome in Japan. There, the duo won the Inspiring Achievement award, which recognized their legacy and popularity in the last 20 years.

From December 23 to January 6, 2024, an exhibition highlight TVXQ's achievements in the past 20 years was held on the island of Yeongjongdo, in Incheon, South Korea.

Following the album's launch, the duo held their 20th debut anniversary concert "2023 TVXQ! CONCERT [20&2]" at the new Inspire Arena in Yeongjongdo, Incheon, South Korea on December 30 and 31. The duo then embarked on their 20&2 Asia concert tour, which began in Seoul on December 30, 2023, followed by shows in Hong Kong, Thailand and Taiwan into February 2024, and Macau and Indonesia in March 2024.

== Reception ==
Professional ratings
Review scores
Source	Rating
IZM	2/5 stars

=== Critical ===
Korean music review magazine IZM: Neo Music Community gave the album a two out of five rating, stating that the album struggled to find a balance between "uniquness and mass appeal", leading to a lack of musical cohesiveness within the album.

=== Chart performance ===
In South Korea, 20&2 debuted at number three on the Circle Album Chart, selling 69,622 copies in the first week. 20&2 became their fastest selling album in a single day to date, recording 30,066 album sales. By March 2024, it has sold over 109,000 copies. In Japan, 20&2 debuted at number 11 on the Oricon Albums Chart and sold over 3,000 copies.

== Track listing ==
20&2 track listing
No.	Title	Lyrics	Music	Arrangement	Length
1.	"Down"	Lee Yoon-seol (Jam Factory); Choi Ji-ae (Jam Factory); Na Jung-ah (153/Joombas); Shin Na-ri (PNP)	Rokman; Benji Bae; PixelWave	Rokman; Benji Bae; Lockhome; PixelWave	3:10
2.	"Rebel"	Kenzie	Jonatan Gusmark; Ludvig Evers; Moa "Cazzi Opeia" Carlebecker; Adrian McKinnon; Kenzie	Moonshine; Kenzie	2:44
3.	"Rodeo"	Kim Min-ji (Jam Factory)	Mike Woods; Michael McCall; Patrick McManus; Benjmn; Feli Ferraro	Mike Woods	2:56
4.	"Jungle"	Maryjane (Lalala Studio); Kim Min-ji (Jam Factory)	Brandon Arreaga; JBach; Kyle Buckley; Charles Roberts Nelsen; MZMC	Pink Slip; Inverness; MZMC	3:01
5.	"Life's a Dance"	Hwang Yu-bin	Lars "Chief1" Pedersen; James Jensen; Nermin Harambasic; Mats Koray Genc; Jakob Mihoubi; Rudi Daouk; Adrian Thesen	Chief1	3:01
6.	"Fix It" (by U-Know featuring DinDin)	DinDin; Lee Hye-yum (Jam Factory)	Sebastian Kornelius Gautier Teigen; Thomas Troelsen; DinDin	Coucheron; Troelsen	3:09
7.	"Take My Breath Away" (by Changmin)	Bong Eun-young (Jam Factory)	Cameron Warren	Warren	3:11
8.	"Promise"	Changmin	Micah Premnath; Ale Alberti; Parrish Warrington; Diederik van Elsas	Trackside	3:19
9.	"The Way U Are" (unplugged version)	Tae Hoon	Daniel Pandher; Robert Zuddas	Kenzie	2:35
10.	"Starlight" (빛나는 계절)	NIve	NIve; Kyum Lyk	Kyum Lyk	3:31
Total length:					30:37

== Credits and personnel ==
Credits adapted from the album's liner notes.

Studio

- SM LVYIN Studio – recording (track 1, 10), digital editing (track 1, 3), engineered for mix (track 3, 8), mixing (track 8)
- SM Big Shot Studio – recording (track 2–3), engineered for mix (track 6), mixing (track 3)
- SM Yellow Tail Studio – recording (track 4, 6), digital editing (track 4, 10), engineered for mix (track 4, 10)
- doobdoob Studio – recording (track 5–6), digital editing (track 5, 8)
- Sound Pool Studio – recording (track 7), digital editing (track 6)
- SM SSAM Studio – recording (track 8–9), digital editing (track 1–2, 7, 9), engineered for mix (track 5, 7, 9)
- 77F Studio – digital editing (track 2)
- SM Concert Hall Studio – mixing (track 1)
- SM Blue Ocean Studio – mixing (track 2, 6, 9)
- KLANG Studio – mixing (track 4–5)
- SM Blue Cup Studio – mixing (track 7)
- SM Starlight Studio – mixing (track 10)
- 821 Sound – mastering (all tracks)

Personnel

- SM Entertainment – executive producer
- Jang Cheol-hyuk – executive supervisor
- TVXQ – vocals (all tracks), background vocals (all tracks) (Note: Including U-Know's background vocals in track 6 and Max Changmin's background vocals in track 7.)
  - Max Changmin – lyrics (track 8)
- DinDin – vocals (track 6), lyrics, composition (track 6)
- Lee Yoon-seol (Jam Factory) – lyrics (track 1)
- Choi Ji-ae (Jam Factory) – lyrics (track 1)
- Na Jung-ah (153/Joombas) – lyrics (track 1)
- Shin Na-ri (PNP) – lyrics (track 1)
- Kenzie – producer (track 2, 9), lyrics (track 2), composition (track 2), arrangement (track 2, 9), vocal directing (track 2, 9)
- Kim Min-ji (Jam Factory) – lyrics (track 3–4)
- Maryjane (Lalala Studio) – lyrics (track 4)
- Hwang Yu-bin – lyrics (track 5)
- Lee Hye-yum (Jam Factory) – lyrics (track 6)
- Bong Eun-young (Jam Factory) – lyrics (track 7)
- Tae Hoon – lyrics (track 9)
- NIve – lyrics, composition (track 10)
- Rokman – producer (track 1), composition, arrangement, background vocals (track 1)
- Benji Bae – composition, arrangement, background vocals (track 1)
- PixelWave – producer (track 1), composition, arrangement (track 1)
- Lockhome – arrangement (track 1)
- Jonatan Gusmark (Moonshine) – producer (track 2), composition, arrangement (track 2)
- Ludvig Evers (Moonshine) – producer (track 2), composition, arrangement (track 2)
- Moa "Cazzi Opeia" Carlebecker – composition, background vocals (track 2)
- Adrian McKinnon – composition, background vocals (track 2)
- Mike Woods – producer (track 3), composition, arrangement (track 3)
- Michael McCall – composition (track 3)
- Patrick McManus – composition (track 3)
- Benjmn – composition, background vocals (track 3)
- Feli Ferraro – composition, background vocals (track 3)
- Brandon Arreaga – composition, background vocals (track 4)
- Jbach – composition, background vocals (track 4)
- Kyle Buckley a.k.a. Pink Slip – producer (track 4), composition, arrangement (track 4)
- Charles Roberts Nelsen a.k.a. Inverness – producer (track 4), composition, arrangement (track 4)
- MZMC – producer (track 4), composition, arrangement (track 4)
- Lars "Chief1" Pedersen – producer (track 5), composition, arrangement (track 5)
- James Jensen – composition (track 5)
- Mats Koray Genc a.k.a. JFMee – composition (track 5)
- Jakob Mihoubi – composition (track 5)
- Rudi Daouk – composition (track 5)
- Nermin Harambasic – composition (track 5)
- Adrian Thesen – composition (track 5)
- Thomas Troelsen – producer (track 6), composition, arrangement (track 6)
- Sebastian Kornelius Gautier Teigen a.k.a. Coucheron – producer (track 6), composition, arrangement (track 6)
- Cameron Warren – producer (track 7), composition, arrangement, background vocals (track 7)
- Micah Premnath – composition (track 8)
- Ale Alberti – composition (track 8)
- Parrish Warrington (Trackside) – producer (track 8), composition, arrangement (track 8)
- Diederik van Elsas (Trackside) – producer (track 8), composition, arrangement (track 8)
- Daniel Pandher – composition (track 9)
- Robert Zuddas – composition (track 9)
- Kyum Lyk – producer (track 10), composition, arrangement (track 10)
- Maxx Song – vocal directing (track 1, 4), Pro Tools operating (track 1)
- MinGtion – vocal directing (track 3, 6)
- Jeon Seung-woo – vocal directing (track 5, 7)
- Kim Jin-hwan – vocal directing (track 8)
- Lee Joo-hyung – vocal directing (track 10), background vocals (track 8, 10)
- Esbee – background vocals (track 3)
- Young Chance – background vocals (track 4)
- Kang Tae-woo a.k.a. Soulman – background vocals (track 5–6)
- Xydo – background vocals (track 9)
- Kim Yoo-hyun – guitar (track 9)
- Klozer – piano (track 10)
- Lee Ji-hong – recording (track 1, 10), digital editing (track 1, 3), engineered for mix (track 3, 8), mixing (track 8)
- Lee Min-kyu – recording (track 2–3), engineered for mix (track 6), mixing (track 3)
- Noh Min-ji – recording (track 4, 6), digital editing (track 4, 10), engineered for mix (track 4, 10)
- Jang Woo-young – recording (track 5), digital editing (track 5)
- Eugene Kwon – recording (track 6), digital editing (track 8)
- Jeong Ho-jin – recording (track 7), digital editing (track 6)
- Kang Eun-ji – recording (track 8–9), digital editing (track 1–2, 7, 9), engineered for mix (track 5, 7, 9)
- Woo Min-jeong – digital editing (track 2)
- Nam Koong-jin – mixing (track 1)
- Kim Cheol-sun – mixing (track 2, 6, 9)
- Koo Jong-pil – mixing (track 4–5)
- Jung Eui-seok – mixing (track 7)
- Jeong Yoo-ra – mixing (track 10)
- Kwon Nam-woo – mastering (all tracks)

== Charts ==
=== Weekly charts ===
Weekly chart performance for 20&2
Chart (2023–2024)	Peak position
Japanese Albums (Oricon)	11
Japanese Combined Albums (Oricon)	13
Japanese Hot Albums (Billboard Japan)	6
South Korean Albums (Circle)	3

=== Monthly charts ===
Monthly chart performance for 20&2
Chart (2023)	Position
Japanese Albums (Oricon)	35
South Korean Albums (Circle)	6
