= Zone (1995 film) =

- Directed by: Takashi Ito
- Release date: 1995
- Running time: 13 minutes
- Country: Japan

Zone is a 1995 Japanese experimental short film directed by Takashi Ito. It features a headless figure restrained to a chair, surrounded by a ghostly, masked figure, a model train, and other imagery.

In 1996, Zone won a Main Prize at the International Short Film Festival in Oberhausen, Germany.

In 2024, Ito adapted his film in truncated form to a music video for the British post-punk band Squid.

== Themes and interpretations ==
Ito described Zone thus:

A film about a man without a face. His arms and legs bound with ropes, a disabled man is still without even a quiver in a white room. This man, enwrapped in wild delusions, is also a reconstruction of myself. A series of unusual scenes in this room that expresses what lies inside me. I tried to create a connection between memories, nightmares and violent images.

Chihiro Minato, curator of the 2000 arts exhibition Serendipity: Photography, Video, Experimental Film and Multimedia Installation from Asia, wrote that Zone displays "the subject as an insubstantial surface" that is "suffused within ... [and] ... turns into a rapidly changing game of speed and afterimages." Chihiro likened the film to a séance, a parallel he argues is reflected in its setting: "a bleak, artificial environment surrounded by steel-reinforced concrete walls."

In 2015, following its screening at the 61st International Short Film Festival in Oberhausen, Yaron Dahan of Mubi described Zone as a culmination of the experimentation Ito exhibited in his previous films Thunder (1982), Ghost (1984), and Grim (1985). In Zone, Dahan writes, a "headless plaster-man is bound to a chair surrounded by recognizable images from his previous work. A ghost inhabits this imagined space: a Noh-masked, light-draped child-demon haunting the artist's passage into the life stage of fatherhood, necessitating a re-evaluation if not reinvention of the self."

== Home media ==
In 2009, Zone was released on DVD along with 19 other films by Ito as part of the Takashi Ito Film Anthology. The DVD includes behind-the-scenes images of construction plans used in the production of Zone.
