= Hot zone =

Hot zone may refer to:

- The Hot Zone, a 1994 non-fiction book by Richard Preston
- Hot zone (environment), a location that is considered to be dangerous

== Art, entertainment, and media ==
=== Television ===
- HOT Zone, an Israeli TC channel on the Hot cable service
- Combat Hospital, a.k.a. The Hot Zone, a 2011 Canadian TV series
- The Hot Zone (American TV series), 2019 TV series based on the Richard Preston book
- "Hot Zone" (Stargate Atlantis), a season 1 episode of the TV series Stargate Atlantis

=== Video games ===
- An area which the player enters in Wardogs

== Other uses ==
- Hot Zone, an alternative name for the Transformers character "Hot Spot"
- Hot-zone, a wireless wide area network offering internet access

== See also ==
- War zone (disambiguation)
- Hot (disambiguation)
- Zone (disambiguation)
