= Spacy (film) =

1981 experimental short film by Takashi Ito

- Title card
- Directed by: Takashi Ito
- Release date: 1981
- Running time: 10 minutes
- Country: Japan

Spacy (スペイシー) is a 1981 Japanese experimental short film directed by Takashi Ito. The film consists of 700 continuous 16 mm still photographs of a gymnasium; using a stop motion technique, the camera appears to move throughout the space and into photographs of the gymnasium itself that are displayed across multiple easels, creating a seemingly endless, recursive visual effect.

In 1995, the Centre Pompidou in Paris, France, purchased Spacy for its film collection.

== Synopsis ==
A frame from Spacy: in a gymnasium stand multiple easels displaying photos of the gymnasium in which they are standing, in an example of visual recursion.

Spacy takes place entirely inside a gymnasium, empty except for several easels which are positioned around the room. On each of the easels is a photograph of the gymnasium itself. Through the use of a stop motion technique, the camera appears to glide throughout the location in varying patterns, repeatedly entering into the photographs on the easels in a seemingly infinite effect. The Guardian's Chris Michael wrote that, in Spacy, "the viewer appears to be taking a roller coaster through an endless series of gyms: forward, left, right, down through the floor; with increasing speed in a recursive world that seems to branch into a vast yet self-repeating space." At the end of the film, the camera comes to a stop at an easel displaying a self-portrait photograph of Ito with a camera.

== Background and production ==
Ito directed Spacy while a student at the Kyushu Institute of Design in Fukuoka, Japan. Prior to creating Spacy, Ito attended an exhibition at which he viewed the 1975 experimental short Ātman, directed by Toshio Matsumoto. Ito was influenced by Ātman to create an 8 mm film titled Noh (1977), which was then followed by a trilogy of 8 mm films—Movement (1978), Movement 2 (1979), and Movement 3 (1980)—the third of which he described as a prototype for Spacy. To Ito's surprise, Matsumoto came to work at the Kyushu Institute of Design, prompting Ito to abandon plans to get an immediate job and instead stay enrolled at the school. Matsumoto served as a mentor for Ito, offering guidance during the production of Spacy, and Ito later stated that, "If Toshio Matsumoto hadn't come to our university, I don't think Spacy would have been born."

Ito's first film shot in 16 mm, Spacy is composed of 700 still photographs of the gymnasium in which it is set, which all together in the finished film create the illusion of continuous movement.

== Release and reception ==
In 1982, Spacy screened at the Hyōgo Prefectural Museum of Art in Japan and the Musée d'Art Moderne de Paris in France. The following year, it was shown at the Hong Kong International Film Festival, as well as at the Museum of Modern Art, Toyama. In 1984, the film screened at the Edinburgh International Film Festival.

"[Spacy] makes you break out in sweat just by shooting a safe, peaceful gymnasium."

– Japanese playwright Koharu Kisaragi

The film was met with considerable applause when it was screened at Osnabrück University in West Germany in 1984. It was later shown at the University of Würzburg, reportedly attracting a standing-room crowd due to positive word-of-mouth from students who attended the Osnabrück screening. According to experimental filmmaker Nobuhiro Kawanaka, after the Würzburg screening, a faculty member passed a hat around the audience that eventually returned filled with a "mountain" of banknotes and coins.

=== Retrospective assessments ===
According to Catherine Munroe Hotes of Midnight Eye, critics have described Spacy as a "cinematic roller coaster". Hotes herself wrote that the film "transforms the ordinary architecture of the interior of a gymnasium into an extraordinary journey through space and time."

Following its screening at the 61st International Short Film Festival in Oberhausen, Germany, in 2015, writer Yaron Dahan of Mubi likened Spacy to a playful basketball game: "Takashi's game begins following the filmic rules, before evolving quickly into one of inventiveness and surprise. The camera moves along invisible geometric patterns (not unlike the lines which define the game of basketball), and the spectacle of space is reinvented."

In 2020, author Julian Ross wrote that Spacy, like Ātman, utilizes still animation techniques in order to "draw attention to film projection as the quick succession of photographs"; Spacy, according to Ross, refined this technique "to dynamic perfection".

== Home media ==
Spacy was released on DVD in 2009, packaged along with 19 of Ito's other films, as part of the two-disc set Takashi Ito Film Anthology. The DVD includes behind-the-scenes images of notebooks and photos used in Spacy's production.

== See also ==
- Droste effect – an effect in visual art of a picture recursively appearing within itself
