= Zon (name) =

Zon, van Zon or Van Zon may refer the following notable people:

Given name

- Zon Moe Aung (born 1993), association football player from Burma
- Zon Murray (1910–1979), American actor
- Zon Eastes (born 1954), American musician

Surname

- Carla Van Zon (1952–2026), New Zealand artistic director
- Erica van Zon (born 1979), New Zealand artist
- Fadli Zon (born 1971), Indonesian politician
- Jacques Zon (1872–1932), Dutch painter
- Kelly van Zon (born 1987), Dutch table tennis player
- Leonard I. Zon, American medical researcher
- Raphael Zon (1874–1956), U.S. Forest Service researcher

== See also ==
- Zoon (disambiguation)
- Zohn
