= Magnetic (The Bausa song) =

Single by The Bausa
- B-side: "Addicted to Your Love"
- Written: 2026
- Released: 27 February 2026
- Genre: House
- Length: 3:01
- Label: Distortion; B1; Sony
- Songwriters: Edvard Bræin Groth; Fredrik von Krogh; Philip Bergenstjerna; Sebastian Coucheron Teigen
- Producers: The Bausa; Coucheron

The Bausa singles chronology
"Sakte film" (2025)	"Magnetic" (2026)

"Magnetic" is a song by Norwegian group The Bausa, released on 27 February 2026 by Distortion Records, in collaboration with B1 Recordings and Sony Music Norway. The house song was written in January 2026 by the band and Norwegian producer Coucheron.

== Background and release ==
In January 2026, The Bausa was working on an album in Norwegian. When they came up with the rhythm for what would become "Addicted to Your Love", they finally realised it was better suited to an English-language song. The band then continued in this vein, writing one song after another, and then came "Magnetic". The whole song was made in a small holiday home by the sea in Norway, set for release once the group signed with Sony Music Norway and Germany-based label B1 Recordings.

The inspiration for the song came from the special atmosphere created by a snowstorm the band experienced in the Norwegian fjords. When asked by the Dutch online newspaper NU.nl about the song's summery feel, the group explained that it had been written in January 2026 under quite the opposite conditions, when it was around -15 degrees outside. The band wanted to escape the winter atmosphere by writing a summery song, incorporating elements they felt were representative of the season, such as a house groove and happy sounds.

The track accumulated over 15 million views before its official release, following the promotion on social media. The song was officially released on 27 February 2026, alongside "Addicted to Your Love". It helped draw attention to the band, gaining popularity outside their native Norway.

== Composition ==
"Magnetic" is a house song incorporating elements of disco and funk, giving the track a groovy atmosphere. With its more electronic sound, the release marks a departure from the pop direction the band had previously explored. Lyrically, the song describes the feeling someone gets when he/she can't resist someone else.

== Usage in media ==
The song was featured in the teaser for the 2025–26 UEFA Conference League final in May 2026.

== Track listing ==
- Digital download and streaming
1. "Magnetic" – 3:01
2. "Addicted to Your Love" – 3:00
- Digital download and streaming
1. "Magnetic" (Samm remix) – 3:38

== Charts ==
=== Weekly charts ===
Weekly chart performance for "Magnetic"
Chart (2026)	Peak position
Belarus Airplay (TopHit)	3
Belgium (Ultratop 50 Flanders)	2
Belgium (Ultratop 50 Wallonia)	10
CIS Airplay (TopHit)	3
Croatia International Airplay (Top lista)	10
Estonia Airplay (TopHit)	6
Finland Airplay (Radiosoittolista)	59
Germany (GfK)	35
Germany Airplay (BVMI)	16
Germany Dance (GfK)	4
Global Dance Radio (Billboard/WARM)	5
Greece International (IFPI)	50
Hungary (Editors' Choice Top 40)	22
Italy (FIMI)	35
Italy Airplay (EarOne)	10
Kazakhstan Airplay (TopHit)	49
Latvia Airplay (LaIPA)	2
Lithuania Airplay (TopHit)	29
Moldova Airplay (TopHit)	32
Netherlands (Dutch Top 40)	2
Netherlands (Single Top 100)	7
Netherlands Airplay (Dutch Charts)	1
New Zealand Hot Singles (RMNZ)	40
North Macedonia Airplay (Radiomonitor)	6
Norway (VG-lista)	3
Poland Airplay (OLiS)	12
Romania Airplay (TopHit)	48
Russia Airplay (TopHit)	2
San Marino Airplay (SMRTV Top 50)	12
Serbia Airplay (Radiomonitor)	1
Slovakia Airplay (ČNS IFPI)	89
Slovenia Airplay (Radiomonitor)	12
Sweden (Sverigetopplistan)	53
Sweden Dance (Sverigetopplistan)	1
Switzerland (Schweizer Hitparade)	27
Turkey International Airplay (Radiomonitor Türkiye)	3

=== Monthly charts ===
Monthly chart performance for "Magnetic"
Chart (2026)	Peak position
Belarus Airplay (TopHit)	5
CIS Airplay (TopHit)	6
Estonia Airplay (TopHit)	7
Kazakhstan Airplay (TopHit)	58
Latvia Airplay (TopHit)	1
Lithuania Airplay (TopHit)	50
Moldova Airplay (TopHit)	38
Romania Airplay (TopHit)	49
Russia Airplay (TopHit)	6

== Certifications ==
Certifications for "Magnetic"
Region	Certification	Certified units/sales
Belgium (BRMA)	Gold	20,000^{‡}
Hungary (MAHASZ)	Gold	2,000^{‡}
Netherlands (NVPI)	Gold	46,500^{‡}
Norway (IFPI Norway)	Platinum	60,000^{‡}
^{‡} Sales+streaming figures based on certification alone.

== Release history ==
Release dates and formats for "Magnetic"
Region	Date	Format	Label	Ref.
Various	27 February 2026	Digital download; streaming	Distortion; B1; Sony	
Italy	27 March 2026	Radio airplay	Sony	
