= Zoning (disambiguation) =

Zoning is the process of dividing land in a municipality into zones in which certain land uses are permitted or prohibited.

Zoning may also refer to:

- Zoning (Australian rules football), an area reserved exclusively for one club
- Zoning (Mary Lou Williams album), 1974
- Zoning (Tangerine Dream album), 1996
- Facing (retail) or zoning, a retail industry stocking practice
- Zoning, tactics used in fighting games to keep opponents at a specific distance
- Zoning, a geological property common in phenocrysts
- Fibre Channel zoning, a method of network partitioning

== See also ==
- Zone (disambiguation)
