= War zone =

War zone or warzone may refer to a zone of war, or to:

== Film and television ==
- The War Zone, a 1999 film starring Ray Winstone
- War Zone (film), a 1998 documentary about street harassment directed by Maggie Hadleigh-West
- "War Zone" (Angel), a 2000 episode of the television series Angel
- "War Zone" (Crusade), the pilot episode of the television series Crusade
- Punisher: War Zone, a 2008 film based on the Marvel comic book series The Punisher War Zone
- War Zone, the second hour of the WWF's weekly show Raw is War from 1997 to 2001

== Games ==
- Call of Duty: Warzone, a 2020 battle royale video game, spinoff of the 2019 game Call of Duty: Modern Warfare
- Warzone 2100, a hybrid real-time strategy/tactics game
- Warzone (game), a table-top miniatures game
- WWF War Zone, a 1998 video game, based on the TV show of the same name

== Music ==
- Warzone Collective, an anarchopunk venue in Belfast
- Warzone (band), a New York skinhead band
- War Zone (group), a rap group consisting of Goldie Loc, MC Eiht & Kam

=== Albums ===
- War Zone (album), a 1999 album by hip hop group Black Moon
- Warzone (Jungle Rot album), 2006
- Warzone (Yoko Ono album), 2018
- In a Warzone, a 2013 album by the punk rock/rap rock band Transplants

=== Songs ===
- "War Zone" (Punisher: War Zone), theme song for the 2008 film Punisher: War Zone by Rob Zombie
- "Warzone" (song), a song by British pop band The Wanted
- "War Zone", a song by Slayer from their 2001 album God Hates Us All
- "Warzone", a 1990 song by Skrewdriver
- "Warzone", a song by Pagoda
- "Warzone" (Pete Rock song), on the 2004 album Soul Survivor II
- "Warz0ne", a song by Stand Atlantic from the 2024 album Was Here
- "Warzone Speedwulf", a song by Nebula on the 2022 album Transmission from Mothership Earth

== See also ==
- Combat Zone (disambiguation)
- Hot zone (disambiguation)
