= La Zona =

La Zona may refer to:

- The Unnamed Zone (Spanish: La Zona), a 2006 Spanish documentary film by director Carlos Rodriguez
- La Zona (film), a 2007 drama film by director Rodrigo Plá
- La zona (TV series), a 2017 Spanish drama television series
- Boy's Town, Nuevo Laredo also called La Zona, a legal zone for prostitution, also called a zone of tolerance
- La Zona (Santurce)
- La Zona, Santa Cruz
