= Coucheron =

Norwegian producer, songwriter, and artist (b. 1994)

- Birth name: Sebastian Kornelius Gautier Teigen
- Also known as: Coucheron
- Born: 6 January 1994 (age 31)
- Genres: Pop, electronic
- Years active: 2004–present
- Labels: Toothfairy Label and Management

Sebastian Kornelius Coucheron-Gautier Teigen (born 6 January 1994), known professionally as Coucheron, is a Norwegian producer, songwriter and artist. He's worked with artists such as Kehlani, Unge Ferrari, Matoma, Mayer Hawthorne, Josie Dunne and Nick Jonas. He's also been making official remixes for O.T. Genasis, Lemaitre and Emily Warren.

In 2016, You Should Be Here, a Kehlani album that Coucheron worked on was nominated for the Grammy Award for Best Urban Contemporary Album .

== Discography ==
Song name	Artist	Album	Year	Role
Sin (Coucheron Remix)	Eye Emma Jedi	Sin Remixes	2012	Remixer
Falling Like Angels - Coucheron Remix	CLMD	Falling Like Angels	2013	Remixer
Fuck You - Coucheron Remix	Maria Mena	Fuck You	2013	Remixer
Fade Away - Coucheron Remix	Nils Noa, Vinni	Fade Away - The Remixes	2014	Remixer
Win It - Coucheron Mix	D'Sound	Signs (Deluxe)	2014	Remixer
Fade Away - Coucheron Remix	Susanne Sundfør	Fade Away Remixes	2014	Remixer
Warning	Nick Jonas	Nick Jonas	2014	Producer, Songwriter
Alive (feat. Coucheron) - Coucheron Remix	Kehlani, Coucheron	You Should Be Here (mixtape)	2015	Producer, Songwriter
DewWutItDoez	KYLE	SMYLE	2015	Producer
CoCo - Coucheron Remix	O.T Genasis, Coucheron	CoCo: The Global Remixes	2015	Remixer
Playground Intro	Coucheron	Playground	2015	Main Artist, Producer, Songwriter
Chocolate Milk (feat. Rye Rye)	Coucheron, Rye Rye	Playground	2015	Main Artist, Producer, Songwriter
Deep End (feat. Eastside and Mayer Hawthorne)	Coucheron, Eastside, Mayer Hawthorne	Playground	2015	Main Artist, Producer, Songwriter
Chameleon (feat. Pav)	Coucheron, Pav	Playground	2015	Main Artist, Producer, Songwriter
Honky Dong (feat. RebMoe)	Coucheron, RebMoe	Playground	2015	Main Artist, Producer, Songwriter
Ruby	Coucheron	Playground	2015	Main Artist, Producer, Songwriter
New Adventures (feat. Pav)	Coucheron, Pav	Playground	2015	Producer, Songwriter, Main Artist
I'm In Love - Coucheron Remix	Noonie Bao, Coucheron	I'm In Love (Coucheron Remix)	2015	Producer, Songwriter, Main Artist
History	Thomas Dybdahl, Coucheron	History EP	2016	Featured Artist, Producer, Songwriter
Anyone Like You - Coucheron Remix	Thomas Dybdahl, Coucheron	History EP	2016	Featured Artist, Producer, Songwriter
Bleed	Thomas Dybdahl, Coucheron	History EP	2016	Featured Artist, Producer, Songwriter
Ghost	Pasha	Bodega	2016	Producer, Songwriter
Told You By Now	Pasha	Bodega	2016	Producer, Songwriter
Loved By You - Coucheron Remix	POWERS, Coucheron	Legendary (Remixes)	2016	Remixer
Loud	Coucheron, SOFIA	Loud	2016	Main Artist, Producer, Songwriter
Puzzled	Coucheron	Loud	2016	Main Artist, Producer, Songwriter
Childhood Dreams	ARY	Childhood Dreams	2017	Producer, Songwriter
Barely Floating (feat. Matilda)	Coucheron, Matilda	Barely Floating (feat. Matilda)	2017	Main Artist, Producer, Songwriter
Library Thugs	RebMoe	RebMoe goes to university	2017	Producer, Songwriter
University Funk	RebMoe	RebMoe goes to university	2017	Producer, Songwriter
High By The Riverside (feat. ARY)	Coucheron, ARY	High By The Riverside (feat. ARY)	2017	Main Artist, Producer, Songwriter
Higher	Lemaitre, Maty Noyes	Chapter One	2017	Producer, Songwriter
Prettyboi Bounce (feat. Soul Gem)	Pasha, Soul Gem	Park.	2017	Producer, Songwriter
Uncover - Coucheron Remix	Kehlani, Coucheron	Uncover (Coucheron Remix)	2017	Remixer
Playing To Loose - Coucheron Remix	Lemaitre	Chapter One	2017	Remixer
Something to Hold On To - Coucheron Remix	Emily Warren	Something to Hold On To	2017	Remixer
UFO	Coucheron	UFO	2017	Main Artist, Producer, Songwriter
Love Pasha	Pasha	Love Pasha	2017	Producer, Songwriter
Alltid	Emir	Alltid	2018	Producer, Songwriter
Back To Us (feat. Mike Waters)	Don Diablo	FUTURE	2018	Songwriter
I Don't Speak French (feat. RebMoe)	Pasha	I Don't Speak French	2018	Producer, Songwriter
Why Wont the Talking Heads Play at Coachella	Nicky Blitz	Why Wont the Talking Heads Play at Coachella	2018	Producer, Songwriter
Machine - Coucheron Remix	Lemaitre	Machine - Coucheron Remix	2018	Remixer
Control (With Jerry Folk)	Lemaitre	Control (With Jerry Folk)	2018	Producer, Songwriter
P.Y.G	Pasha	P.Y.G	2018	Producer, Songwriter
Rocket Girl (feat. Betty Who)	Lemaitre	Rocket Girl (feat. Betty Who)	2018	Producer, Songwriter
Good Time	Nicky Blitz	Good Time	2018	Producer, Songwriter
Freaky	Pasha	PARK.	2018	Producer, Songwriter
Purple Pudding	Pasha	PARK.	2018	Producer, Songwriter
Hunnys	Pasha	PARK.	2018	Producer, Songwriter
Borderlines	Soul Gem	Borderlines	2018	Producer, Songwriter
Good Time - Coucheron Remix	Nicky Blitz, Coucheron	Good Time - Coucheron Remix	2018	Remixer, Producer, Songwriter
Fake It	SOFIA	Fake It	2018	Producer, Songwriter
Why Am I Like This?	RebMoe	Why Am I Like This?	2018	Producer, Songwriter
It's Not This (feat. Lemaitre & Josh Pan)	Bearson	It's Not This	2018	Producer, Songwriter
Ung & Dum (feat. Coucheron)	Unge Ferrari	Ung & Dum	2018	Featured Artist, Producer, Songwriter
Big	Lemaitre	Big	2018	Producer, Songwriter
Big (feat. Timbuktu)	Lemaitre	Spotify Singles	2018	Producer, Songwriter
Du Vet (Yeahx3)	EMIR	Mer Av Deg	2018	Producer, Songwriter
Follow You (feat. Coucheron)	SOFIA		2018	Featured Artist, Producer, Songwriter
Smoke	Lemaitre	Fast Lovers	2019	Producer, Songwriter
Ruin Your Party	Sval	Ruin Your Party	2019	Producer, Songwriter
Smoke - Coucheron Remix	Lemaitre	Smoke (Coucheron Remix)	2019	Remixer, Producer, Songwriter
Warrior	Coucheron	Warrior	2019	Main Artist, Producer, Songwriter
Cold	Coucheron	Cold	2019	Main Artist, Producer, Songwriter
Cold - La Felix Remix	Coucheron	Cold - La Felix Remix	2019	Main Artist, Producer, Songwriter
Sidelinjen	EMIR	Det Lille Ingenting	2019	Producer, Songwriter
Ecstacy	Coucheron	Ecstacy	2019	Main Artist, Producer, Songwriter
I Don't Wanna Lose A Friend	SOFIA	I Don't Wanna Lose A Friend	2019	Producer, Songwriter
Nobody	Pasha x Coucheron	Nobody	2020	Main Artist, Producer, Songwriter
Følsom	Amanda Delara	Et Lite Stykke Norge	2020	Producer, Songwriter
Good Ones - Coucheron Remix	LeyeT	Good Ones (Coucheron Remix)	2020	Remixer
Wondering If I'll Ever Come Down	Lemaitre	Wondering If I'll Ever Come Down	2020	Producer, Songwriter
Håpløs	EMIR	Håpløs	2020	Producer, Songwriter
Lighthouse	Pasha x Coucheron	Lighthouse	2020	Main Artist, Producer, Songwriter
Mayday	Victon	Mayday	2020	Producer, Songwriter
Stop Me Fast	Lemaitre	JGM	2020	Producer, Songwriter
The End Is Bright	St. Valentine	The End Is Bright	2020	Producer, Songwriter
Rainbow Train (feat. Coucheron)	Ninajirachi	Blumiere	2020	Featured Artist, Producer, Songwriter
I SPY	Pasha	I SPY	2020	Main Artist, Producer, Songwriter
Ka Har Du Gjort?	Zupermaria	Ka Har Du Gjort?	2020	Producer, Songwriter
Where To Go	SOFIA	Where To Go	2020	Producer, Songwriter
Natalie Portman (feat. Safario)	Pasha x Coucheron	G.O.L	2020	Main Artist, Producer, Songwriter
Yakuzivibes	Pahsa x Coucheron	G.O.L	2020	Main Artist, Producer, Songwriter
Hold Hands	Pahsa x Coucheron	G.O.L	2020	Main Artist, Producer, Songwriter
Q10	Pahsa x Coucheron	G.O.L	2020	Main Artist, Producer, Songwriter
Bustin' Cumin'	Pahsa x Coucheron	G.O.L	2020	Main Artist, Producer, Songwriter
Gucci	Pahsa x Coucheron	G.O.L	2020	Main Artist, Producer, Songwriter
Ney	Pahsa x Coucheron	G.O.L	2020	Main Artist, Producer, Songwriter
E På Saken	Zupermaria	Ka Har Du Gjort Nå Maria	2020	Producer, Songwriter
Førstemann	Zupermaria	Ka Har Du Gjort Nå Maria	2020	Producer, Songwriter
Jackie Onassis	Elio	Jackie Onassis	2020	Producer, Songwriter
Være Med Deg (feat. Coucheron)	Ka2	Være Med Deg	2020	Featured Artist, Producer, Songwriter
Dagen Pappa Grein	Kapteinen	Dagen Pappa Grein	2020	Producer, Songwriter
Merry Xmas	Elio	Merry Xmas	2020	Producer, Songwriter
3M	JNS ft. Dreamon	3M	2021	Producer, Songwriter
03' Kanye	JNS	Pandemivinter	2021	Producer, Songwriter
All This	Ruben	Animosity	2021	Producer, Songwriter
Can't Stop	Coucheron	Can't Stop	2021	Main Artist, Producer, Songwriter
Apple of My Eye	Andreyun	Apple of My Eye	2021	Producer, Songwriter
Cannonball	Coucheron	Cannonball	2021	Main Artist, Producer, Songwriter
Firm Foundation	SOFIA	Firm Foundation	2021	Producer, Songwriter
Sofia	Natnael	Sofia	2021	Producer, Songwriter
Nervous	Mathilda	Nervous	2021	Producer, Songwriter
You And I	Pasha	You And I	2021	Producer, Songwriter
Dans Med Meg	Zupermaria	Dans Med Meg	2021	Producer, Songwriter
Bloc Party	Andreyun	Bloc Party	2021	Producer, Songwriter
BET	THE BOYS	BET	2021	Producer, Songwriter
Mango IPA	Slæm Dunk	Mango IPA	2021	Producer, Songwriter
Sparrow	Lemaitre	Sparrow	2021	Producer, Songwriter
VVK	Stig Brenner	Hvite Duer, Sort Magi	2021	Producer, Songwriter
Sort Magi	Stig Brenner	Hvite Duer, Sort Magi	2021	Songwriter
Jackie Onassis (ft. Nolie)	ELIO	Jackie Onassis	2021	Producer, Songwriter
Talk It Out	LeyeT	Talk It Out	2021	Featured Artist, Producer, Songwriter
ABC	Zupermaria	ABC	2021	Producer, Songwriter
Mango IPA - Remix	Slæm Dønk	Kjartanisme	2021	Producer, Songwriter
Tre Sekund	Kjartan Lauritzen	Kjartanisme	2021	Producer, Songwriter
Ta På Meg	Kjartan Lauritzen	Kjartanisme	2021	Producer, Songwriter
Stoppe Oss No	Kjartan Lauritzen	Kjartanisme	2021	Producer, Songwriter
Sånn Eg Ser Det	Kjartan Lauritzen	Kjartanisme	2021	Producer, Songwriter
Migrenemann	Kjartan Lauritzen	Kjartanisme	2021	Producer, Songwriter
Hands Up	Ohana Bam	Hands Up	2021	Producer, Songwriter
Hvor Enn Vi Gaar (Alltid. Uannsett.)	Nicolay Ramm		2021	Producer, Songwriter
Asking For A Friend	LeyeT	Asking For A Friend	2021	Producer, Songwriter
Dråpe I Havet	Ka2	Dråpe I Havet	2021	Producer, Songwriter
Again	SOFIA	Again	2021	Producer, Songwriter
Tied Up	Coucheron x Pasha	G.O.L	2021	Main Artist, Producer, Songwriter
Twisted	Coucheron x Pasha	G.O.L	2021	Main Artist, Producer, Songwriter
Neste År	Bendik & Eirik Aas	Neste År	2021	Producer, Songwriter
Tree House	Lemaitre	Tree House	2021	Producer, Songwriter
OK Computer	Lemaitre	OK Computer	2021	Producer, Songwriter
Komme Hjem	Bendik & Eirik Aas	Komme Hjem	2021	Producer, Songwriter
Her Hos Deg	Bendik	Her Hos Deg	2022	Producer, Songwriter
Diskotek - Coucheron Remix	Jesper Jenset	Diskotek (Coucheron Remix)	2022	Remixer
For Years	ARY	For Evig	2022	Producer, Songwriter
