= Uchat-Zon =

Uchat-Zon Учэт-Зон
- Village
- Location within Perm Krai Location within Russia
- Coordinates: 58°53′N 54°15′E
- Country: Russia
- Region: Perm Krai
- District: Kudymkarsky District
- Time zone: UTC+5:00

Uchat-Zon (Russian: Учэт-Зон) is a rural locality (a village) in Verkh-Invenskoye Rural Settlement, Kudymkarsky District, Perm Krai, Russia. The population was 23 as of 2010. There is 1 street.

== Geography ==
Uchat-Zon is located 31 km southwest of Kudymkar (the district's administrative centre) by road. Nelsina is the nearest rural locality.
