= Parallel Parallel =

- Digital cover

Single by Tohoshinki
- B-side: "No Sympathy"
- Released: January 31, 2023 (release history)
- Genre: J-pop
- Length: 3:37
- Label: Avex Trax
- Songwriter: JeL

Tohoshinki singles chronology
"Utsuroi" (2022)	"Parallel Parallel" (2023)	"Lime & Lemon" (2023)

Music video
- "Parallel Parallel" on YouTube

"Parallel Parallel" (stylized in all caps) is the 50th Japanese single by South Korean pop duo Tohoshinki, first digitally released by Avex Trax on January 31, 2023, and then as a CD single on February 1, 2023. "Parallel Parallel" was released in three physical CD versions, which included two separate limited edition A4 photobook editions and a fan club "board" edition released exclusively for Tohoshinki's Japanese fan club, Bigeast.

"Parallel Parallel" debuted at number three on the Oricon Singles Chart and number thirty-five on the Billboard Japan Hot 100.

== Background and promotion ==
One month after the release of their 49th single "Utsuroi," Avex Entertainment announced that Tohoshinki would be embarking on a nation-wide arena tour in 2023, later confirming the name to be the Classyc Tour. "Parallel Parallel" was announced in December 2022, starting with the release of its first teaser images on December 23. The second set of images were revealed on December 24, and a third set, to feature exclusively on the fan club board edition, was dropped on December 25. Avex shared the music video teaser for "Parallel Parallel" on January 29, 2023. The music video was officially released on January 31, coinciding with the single's digital release.

The single was released in Japan on streaming platforms and made available for download on January 31, 2023, at 6 PM. The CD single was released on February 1, 2023. A limited amount of postcards were made available for those who purchased the CD single at various music stores. Fans were eligible to participate in a lottery to retrieve passes for a meet and greet at Tohoshinki's Classyc Tour Tokyo Dome and Kyocera Dome Osaka stops using the serial numbers from purchasing all three versions of the CD single. Visual stickers were gifted to those who downloaded the single via iTunes and Line Music. The jacket-making and behind the scenes video of "Parallel Parallel" was posted on February 2, and a lyric video for the single's B-side track "No Sympathy" was released on February 3. The dance practice video of "Parallel Parallel" was released on February 13, 2023.

The song was selected to be the theme song of the 2023 LPGA of Japan Tour, which premiered on March 5, 2023, on Wowow.

== Commercial performance ==
"Parallel Parallel" debuted at number three on the Oricon Singles Chart with 27,929 copies sold. It was the tenth best-selling single for the month of February 2023, and sold 38,736 copies as of December 2023. On the Billboard Japan Hot 100, it debuted at number thirty-five.

== Live performances ==
Tohoshinki debuted their first performance of "Parallel Parallel" on Nippon TV's Sukkiri!! on February 14, 2023. "Parallel Parallel" and "No Sympathy" were both part of the set list for their 2013 arena concert tour, the Classyc Tour.

== Formats and track listings ==
- Digital download and streaming
1. "Parallel Parallel" – 3:37
2. "No Sympathy" – 3:13
3. "Parallel Parallel -Less Vocal-" – 3:36
4. "No Sympathy -Less Vocal" – 3:11

CD single AVCK-79917, AVCK-79918, AVC1-79919

1. "Parallel Parallel" – 3:37
2. "No Sympathy" – 3:13
3. "Parallel Parallel -Less Vocal-" – 3:36
4. "No Sympathy -Less Vocal" – 3:11

== Charts ==
Chart (2022)	Peak position
Japan (Oricon Singles Chart)	3
Billboard Japan Hot 100	35

=== Sales ===
Released	Oricon chart	Peak	Debut sales	Sales total
February 1, 2023	Weekly Singles Chart	3	27,929	38,746
February 1, 2023	Monthly Singles Chart (February)	10	32,392	38,746
February 1, 2023	Yearly Singles Chart (2023)	111	38,746	38,746

== Release history ==
Region	Date	Format	Label
Worldwide	January 31, 2023	Digital download on iTunes Store	Avex Entertainment
South Korea	January 31, 2023	Digital download	S.M. Entertainment
Japan	February 1, 2023	CD	Avex Trax
