= Spacey =

Spacey may refer to:

- Kevin Spacey (born 1959), American actor, director, screenwriter and producer
- Marieanne Spacey (born 1966), English footballer
- Spacey Awards, also referred to as the Spaceys, awards presented by the Canadian cable network Space
- Spacey Jane, an Australian indie rock band formed in 2016
