= La Zona (Santurce) =

Subbarrio of Santurce in San Juan, Puerto Rico

Coordinates: 18°26′34″N 66°04′38″W

- Subbarrio
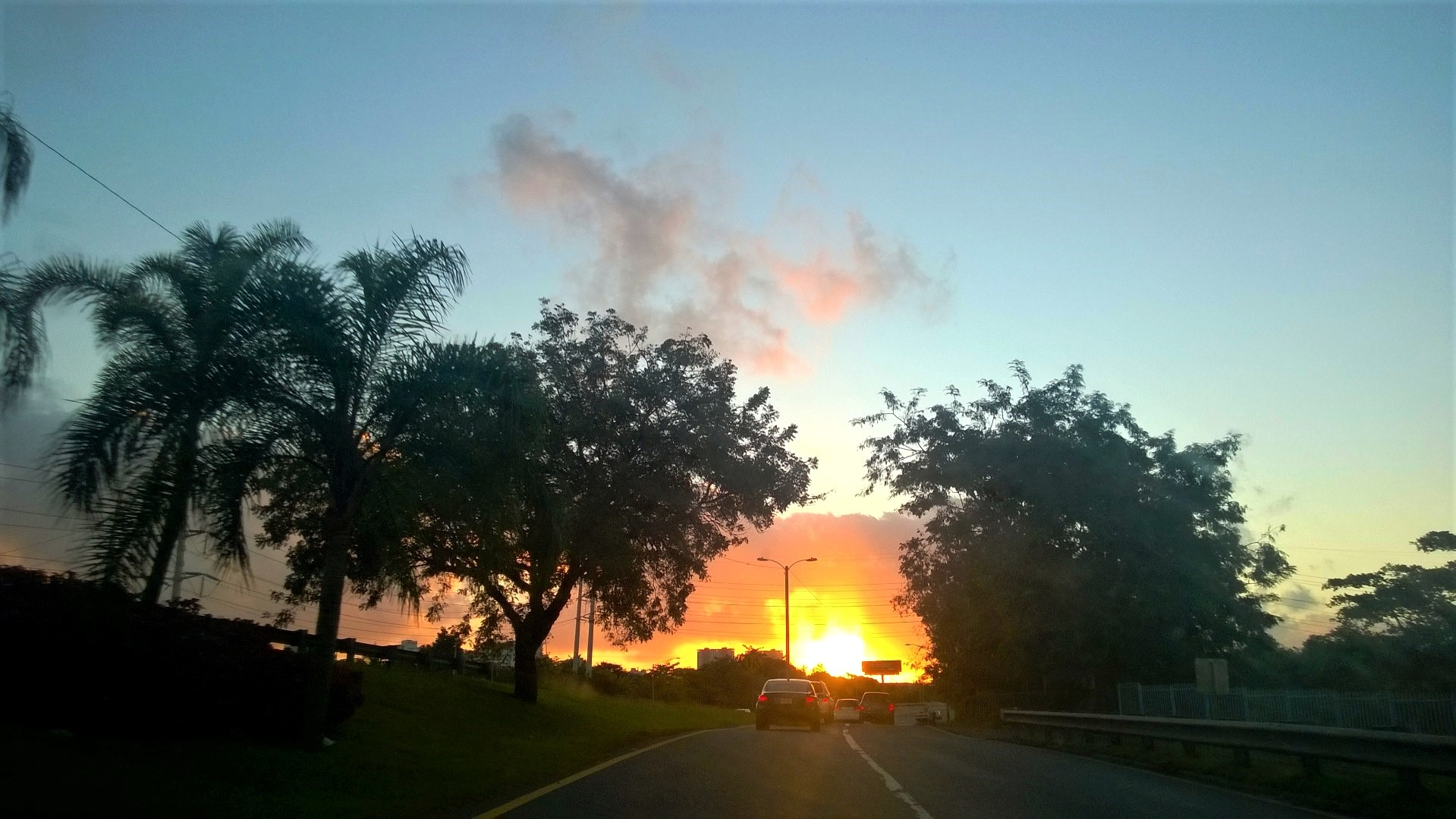
- Puerto Rico Highway 1 in La Zona

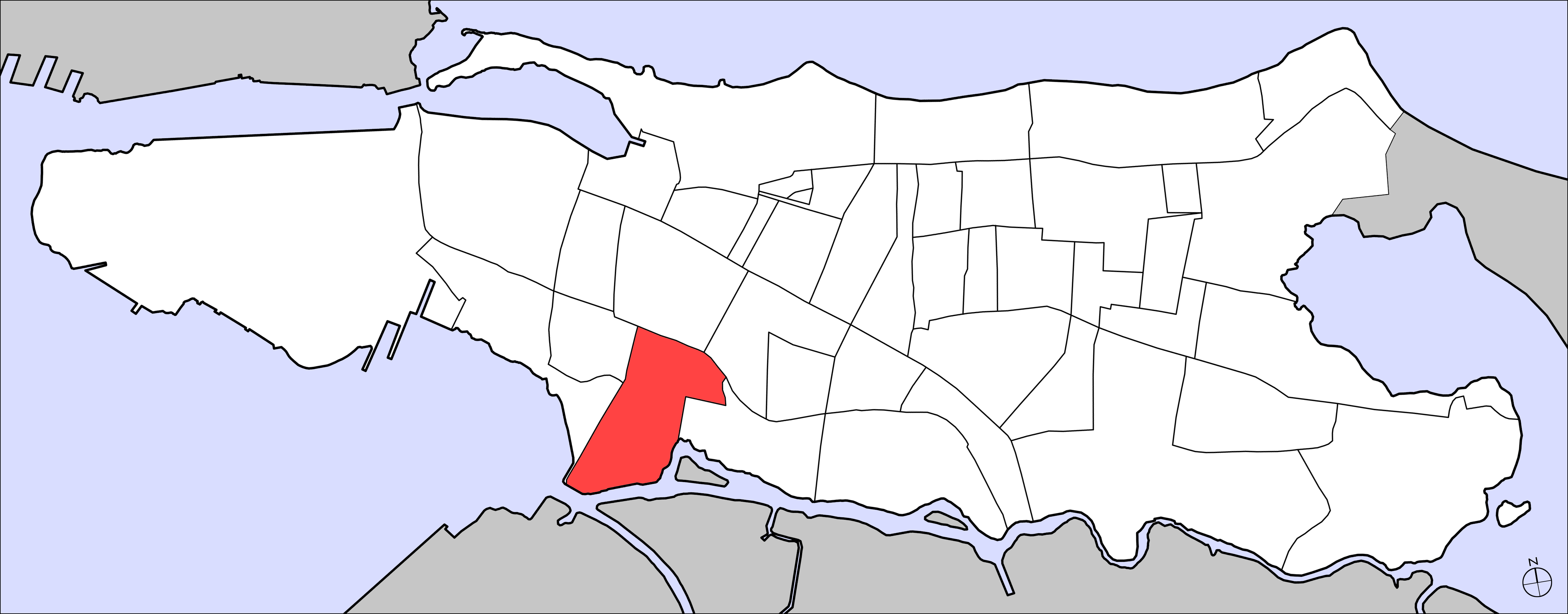
- Commonwealth: Puerto Rico
- Municipality: San Juan
- Barrio: Santurce

Area
  - Total: .16 sq mi (0.41 km^{2})
  - Land: .15 sq mi (0.39 km^{2})
  - Water: .01 sq mi (0.026 km^{2})
- Elevation: 10 ft (3.0 m)

Population (2010)
  - Total: 1,061
  - Density: 7,073.3/sq mi (2,731.0/km^{2})
- Source: 2010 Census
- Time zone: UTC−4 (AST)

La Zona is one of the forty subbarrios of Santurce, San Juan, Puerto Rico.

== Demographics ==
In 1940, La Zona had a population of 4,220.

In 2000, La Zona had a population of 1,280.

In 2010, La Zona had a population of 1,061 and a population density of 7,073.3 persons per square mile.

== Location ==
La Zona is the crossover section of Santurce, straddling both south and north of Interstate PR-1 (Luis Muñoz Rivera Expressway).

Central Park (Parque Central) is located between Morocco and Hoare streets on the south end of La Zona.

== See also ==
- List of communities in Puerto Rico
