= Ātman (1975 film) =

1975 Japanese experimental short film

- Directed by: Toshio Matsumoto
- Cinematography: Hiroshi Yamazaki; Kenji Takama
- Music by: Toshi Ichiyanagi
- Release date: 1975
- Running time: 11 minutes
- Country: Japan

A frame from Ātman

Ātman (Japanese: アートマン, Hepburn: Ātoman) is a 1975 Japanese experimental short film directed by Toshio Matsumoto.

== Film ==
The film depicts a figure sitting in an outdoor environment and wearing a robe and a Hannya mask. The film features receding and shifting images captured in a frame-by-frame manner; though these shots resemble zooms and pans, they were actually derived from positioning the camera on a series of a points.

== Reception ==
In 1978, a writer for the Millennium Film Journal called Ātman "an intricately constructed film", and compared it to Michael Snow's Wavelength (1967) and Hollis Frampton's Travelling Matte (1973).

The techniques Matsumoto used in this film were influential on his student Takashi Ito.
