= In the Zone (disambiguation) =

In the Zone is a 2003 album by Britney Spears.

In the Zone may also refer to:

== Music ==
- Britney Spears: In the Zone, a 2004 video album
- In the Zone (Wayman Tisdale album) or the title song, 1996
- "In the Zone" (song), by Ivy Queen, 1999
- "In the Zone", a song by Blueface from Find the Beat, 2020

== Television ==
- "In the Zone" (NCIS), an episode
- "In the Zone" (The Outer Limits), an episode
- "In the Zone", a special episode of The Magic School Bus Rides Again

== Other uses ==
- In the Zone (play), a 1917 play by Eugene O'Neill
- In the Zone, the third part of Thomas Pynchon's novel Gravity's Rainbow
- Big Nate: In the Zone, a novel written by Lincoln Peirce
- In the zone (psychology), or flow, a mental state
