= The Bausa =

Norwegian pop group

- The Bausa in 2026

Background information
- Also known as: Brødrene Bausa (2021–2023); Bausa (2023–2025)
- Origin: Bærum, Norway
- Genres: Pop; electronica; house; russ music
- Years active: 2021–present
- Labels: Distortion; Sony Music Norway
- Members: Edvard Bræin Groth; Philip Bergenstjerna; Fredrik von Krogh
- Website: www.instagram.com/thebausa/

The Bausa is a Norwegian pop group from Bærum, that consists of Edvard Bræin Groth, Philip Bergenstjerna and Fredrik von Krogh.

== History ==
The group began producing music when they were in their first year of high school. They debuted in 2021 under the name Brødrene Bausa with the song "Ballpark 2021".

In the summer of 2023, the group changed its name to Bausa. That same year, they had their breakthrough with the song "Turné", which reached 2nd place on the Norwegian charts (VG-lista). "Turné" topped the charts in the spring and summer of 2023, while the group itself was russ (Russefeiring). They were nominated in the categories "Song of the Year", "Breakthrough of the Year" and "Party Music of the Year" at the Spellemannprisen 2023 (the Norwegian equivalent to the Grammy Awards).

In April 2024, the group released their debut album Ung & Dum. In 2025, the group had several releases that did well on the charts. The song "Overfladisk" was voted "Song of the Month" and led to a nomination for the Spellemannprisen 2025 in the "Song of the Year" category.

In 2026, the group changed their name to The Bausa and signed an international record deal with Sony Music Entertainment in collaboration with B1 Recordings in Germany. In February 2026, they released the songs "Magnetic" and "Addicted to Your Love".

== Band members ==
- Edvard Bræin Groth (2021–present)
- Philip Bergenstjerna (2021–present)
- Fredrik von Krogh (2021–present)

== Discography ==
Studio albums

- Ung & Dum (2024)

Singles

- "Turné" (2023) NOR# 2
- "Sjanse" (2023)
- "Gassed" (2025) NOR# 17
- "Sjonglerer" (2025) NOR# 3
- "Overfladisk" (2025) NOR# 2
- "St. Tropez" (2025) NOR# 11
- "En vakker dag" (2025) NOR# 44
- "Sakte film" (2025) NOR# 65
- "Magnetic / Addicted to Your Love" (2026) NOR# 3
- "Lose Myself / I Wanna" (2026) NOR# 13
