= Combat Zone =

A combat zone or conflict zone is a location of military or other combat, but the term may also refer to:

- Combat Zone, Boston, the nickname for an adult entertainment district in downtown Boston, Massachusetts
- Combat Zone (TV series), a music video program on Canadian music television station MuchMusic
- Conflict Zone (news programme), a Deutsche Welle interview program
- Combat Zone, a documentary television series about combat on The Military Channel
- Combat Zone, an independent gelblaster arena based at Willen Lake
- Combat Zone, a brand of airsoft guns by Umarex
- Combat Zone Wrestling, an American-based professional wrestling promotion

== See also ==
- War zone (disambiguation)
