= Utsuroi =

- Digital cover

Single by Tohoshinki
- B-side: "The Reflex"
- Released: July 31, 2022 (release history)
- Genre: J-pop
- Length: 4:03
- Label: Avex Trax
- Songwriter: Katsuhiko Yamamoto
- Producer: Katsuhiko Yamamoto

Tohoshinki singles chronology
"Epitaph (For the Future)" (2022)	"Utsuroi" (2022)	"Parallel Parallel" (2023)

Music video
- "Utsuroi" on YouTube

"Utsuroi" (移ろい; "Changing") (stylized UTSUROI) is the 49th Japanese CD single by South Korean pop duo Tohoshinki, first digitally released by Avex Trax on July 31, 2022, and then as a CD single on August 17, 2022. "Utsuroi" was released in three physical versions – a standard CD only version, a limited photobook edition, and a fanclub edition released exclusively for Tohoshinki's Japanese fan club, Bigeast. Promoted as a summer single, "Utsuroi" is described as a medium-tempo ballad song reminiscent of Japanese city pop, accompanied by a vocal harmony. Lyrically, the song is about cherishing one's closest friends, and to strive towards a better future together.

"Utsuroi" debuted at number two on the Oricon Singles Chart and number thirty-two on the Billboard Japan Hot 100.

== Background and promotion ==
"Utsuroi" was announced on June 26, 2022, on the last day of Tohoshinki's fanmeeting tour, The Garden Tours. A preview of the song was revealed on YouTube on July 13, which also included a teaser trailer for the album jacket's photoshoot. The album jackets and the single's B-side track "The Reflex" were revealed on July 17, A preview of "The Reflex" was revealed on July 24. "Utsuroi" was digitally released on July 31, 2022.

A teaser video of the single's accompanying music video was released on YouTube on August 13, and the music video dropped on August 14 at 12:00 PM JST. The digital single and CD single were officially released online and nation-wide on August 16. A "lip version" of the music video was released on August 17. As "Utsuroi" was the duo's first Japanese single in two years, Tohoshinki appeared on various radio station programs from August to September 2022 to promote the single.

== Formats and track listings ==
- Digital download and streaming
1. "Utsuroi" – 4:03
2. "The Reflex" – 3:34
3. "Utsuroi -Less Vocal-" – 4:02
4. "The Reflex -Less Vocal" – 3:34

CD single AVCK-79864, AVCK-79865, AVC1-79866

1. "Utsuroi"
2. "The Reflex"
3. "Utsuroi -Less Vocal-"
4. "The Reflex -Less Vocal"

== Charts ==
Chart (2022)	Peak position
Japan (Oricon Singles Chart)	2
Billboard Japan Hot 100	32

=== Sales ===
Released	Oricon chart	Peak	Debut sales	Sales total
August 17, 2022	Weekly Singles Chart	3	24,696	27,003
August 17, 2022	Monthly Singles Chart (August)	8	25,541	27,003
August 17, 2022	Yearly Singles Chart (2022)	—N/a	—N/a	27,003

== Release history ==
Region	Date	Format	Label
Worldwide	July 31, 2022	Digital download on iTunes Store	Avex Entertainment
Japan	August 17, 2022	CD	Avex Trax
South Korea	August 17, 2022	Digital download	S.M. Entertainment
