= Zone (surname) =

Zone is a surname. Notable people with the surname include:

- Mary Zone (1919 – 2005), American Democratic politician
- Ray Zone (1947–2012), American film historian, author, artist, and pioneer in methods of converting flat images into stereoscopic images
