= Thunder (1982 film) =

1982 Japanese experimental short film

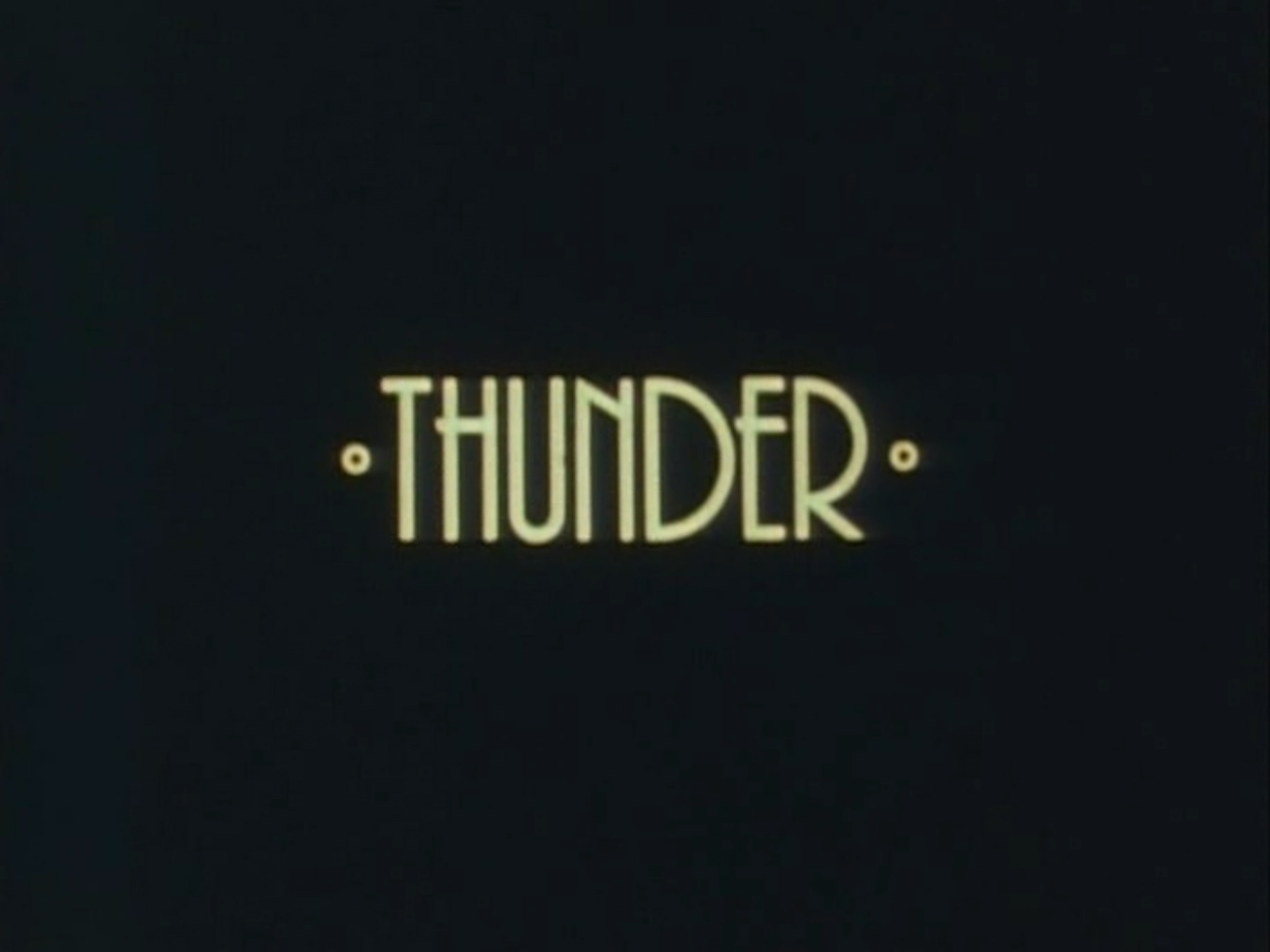
- Title card
- Directed by: Takashi Ito
- Release date: 1982
- Running time: 5 minutes
- Country: Japan

Thunder is a 1982 Japanese experimental short film directed by Takashi Ito. Shot on 16 mm film, Thunder makes use of long-exposure photography. Along with Ito's films Ghost (1984) and Grim (1985), Thunder has been noted for its ghostly imagery and ominous tone.

== Synopsis ==
Thunder features a series of photographic slides of a woman repeatedly covering and uncovering her face with her hands, projected onto the interiors of an empty office building. The images bend and distort against the interior surfaces. Additionally, a long ribbon of light is seen curling and oscillating. The effect of the ribbon of light was produced using long-exposure photography, created frame-by-frame by a person with a flashlight moving throughout the building's rooms during long single-frame exposures.

== Release ==
Thunder screened as part of the 34th Berlin International Film Festival in 1984, and was later shown at the Ishikawa Prefectural Museum of Art in 1996.

== Home media ==
Thunder was released on DVD along with a number of Ito's other works as part of the Takashi Ito Film Anthology.
