= Lemaitre (band) =

Norwegian musical duo

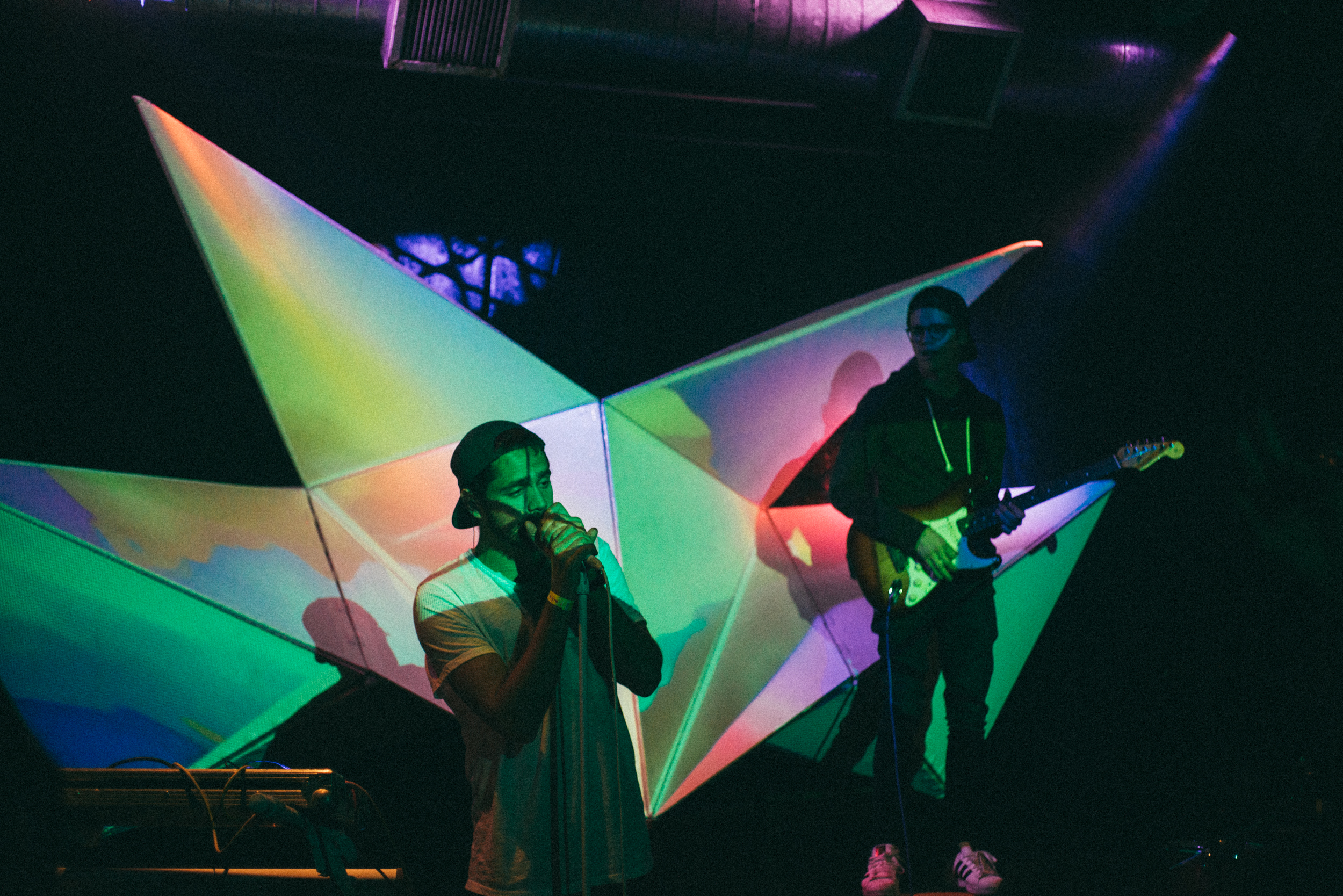
- Lemaitre's band members Ketil Jansen Ditlev-Simonsen and Ulrik Denizou Lund performing on tour

Background information
- Origin: Oslo, Norway
- Genres: Electro house; French house; electronic rock; indietronica; nu-disco
- Years active: 2010–present
- Labels: Astralwerks, Substellar
- Members: Ketil Jansen Ditlev-Simonsen; Ulrik Denizou Lund
- Website: LemaitreMusic.com

Lemaitre (pronounced French: [ləmɛtʁ]) is a Norwegian indie electronic duo hailing from Oslo. The duo consists of members Ketil Jansen Ditlev-Simonsen and Ulrik Denizou Lund. Jansen and Lund came together to form Lemaitre on 20 June 2010. Lemaitre is currently based in Oslo, Norway.

Since the duo's inception in summer 2010, Lemaitre has released a number of EPs, including The Friendly Sound; the Relativity Series: Relativity 1, 2, 3; Relativity by Nite; and Singularity. The duo released their seventh EP, 1749, on 29 January 2016, and released a compilation album, Chapter One, on 2 June 2017.

In early 2021 Lemaitre released the single Trip Sitter together with Sofiloud. This was then followed by the releases of the single Sparrow with Emelie Hollow in June, the single OK Computer with RebMoe in August, and Reflection in early September. The final single, What About U, featuring Anna of the North was released on 22 October, alongside an announcement for their sophomore album Substellar, released 19 November 2021.

Lemaitre released a series of three singles throughout 2022 and 2023, Dive, Rich Kids with Thea Wang, and Stjerner Oppi Taket with Ka2, followed by two new EP's in 2024, RED on 9 February and BLUE on 8 November, marking their ninth and tenth EP's, respectively.

== History ==
=== 2010–2014: Formation and early years ===
Lemaitre's logo, used in almost every EP made by them as a means of visual identification

During an interview, Lund and Jansen explained that the band is named after Georges Lemaître, a Belgian priest who first proposed the Big Bang theory and derived the physics concept now referred to as Hubble's law. In a 2014 music discovery piece with Interview magazine, Jansen further added "Le maitre" means "the master" in French, though the pair were unaware of this when first choosing a name for the project.

Lemaitre's first track was titled "Momentum", now dating 16 years since its initial release. This track was one of two tracks released prior to releasing their debut EP, The Friendly Sound—the other being "Primeval Atom".

==== Relativity series ====
Lemaitre is most commonly recognized for their series of EPs: the Relativity Series. This series consists of the following EPs: Relativity 1, Relativity 2, Relativity 3, and Relativity By Nite. The duo was praised for their use of all original samples.

Relativity By Nite was differed from most of Lemaitre's previous EPs in that it was longer in comparison to previous EP releases and almost entirely consisted of unheard remixes and instrumental pieces.

Lemaitre's third EP and second in the Relativity Series, Relativity 2, topped the Canadian charts and US iTunes electronic albums category during May of 2012. The EP went to top charts across a number of countries, placing #3 in Switzerland, #8 in Australia and #10 in France. Worldwide, Relativity 2 charted at #4 in iTunes' Pop category.

==== Joining Astralwerks ====
In January 2014, the duo signed to Astralwerks Records: home to notable acts, including Daft Punk, whom Lemaitre has previously referenced as a significant source of inspiration for the group's music style. Consequently, Lemaitre had the opportunity to work on remixes for other Astralwerks artists, such as Porter Robinson. Jansen and Lund are credited and featured on the song "Polygon Dust" from Porter Robinson's album, Worlds.

Furthermore, Lemaitre mentioned that the 'choice [to join Astralwerks] felt right', especially given that the label was home to some their own "sonic heroes", namely Daft Punk and The Chemical Brothers.

=== 2014–present: 1749, Chapter One, Fast Lovers and Substellar ===
On 29 January 2016, the duo released their seventh EP, 1749. The name "1749" was inspired by the home Lemaitre had been living in during their time in Los Angeles—which also serves as a low budget–home studio for the pair. The home was previously owned by famed American rapper and producer Dr. Dre during the 1990s.

Following the release of 1749, Lemaitre embarked on a short 7-city European tour during February, including a stop in their homeland in Oslo, Norway. During this time, the music video for the song "Stepping Stone" featuring artist Mark Johns, a member of Skrillex's Owsla creative collective, was released on 18 February 2016.

Jansen and Lund have appeared in festivals such as Coachella in April and Findings Festival at Norway in the late summer.

On 2 June 2017, the duo released their first album, Chapter One.

Their eighth EP, titled Fast Lovers, was released on 1 March 2019.

In 2020 they released four singles.

In 2021 they released a series of singles culminating in their sophomore album Substellar, released 19 November 2021.

In 2022 they released two singles followed by another two in 2023.

In 2024 they released their ninth and tenth EP's, RED and BLUE.

The duo moved back to Oslo in late 2024 where they built a brand new studio as part of the studio collective Oslo Lydproduksjon.

=== Appearances in media ===
Several of Lemaitre's songs were featured mainstream media adverts. The song "1:18" from Lemaitre's debut EP, The Friendly Sound appeared in Apple's product advert "Designed Together", which showcased the then newly released iPhone 5c's fluent integration with the iOS 7 mobile operating system. Additionally, on 4 February 2016, Lemaitre's song "Cut To Black" received worldwide attention on Facebook for Facebook's 12th Anniversary, which came to be known as "Friends' Day", a feature that compiled of photos and memories commemorating friendship into user-specific videos.

In March 2016, it was announced that Lemaitre, along with other musical acts AlunaGeorge and Broiler, were collaborating with the video game Minecraft to "perform a show in the game setting", as a part of Norwegian game conference The Gathering. The event provided users with the unique experience of a concert "simultaneously recreated within the Minecraft world [...] Just like a real concert". This event was considered as the world's "first live Minecraft concert".

Their song "We Got U," featuring the Knocks, featured on the soundtrack for FIFA 17.

On 4 October 2016, their song "Closer" was played in a video for the newly launched Google Pixel phone.

The song "Closer" also appeared in the first episode of the first season of the Norwegian teen drama Skam.

In 2017, their song "Stepping Stone" was featured in the soundtrack for the PlayStation 4 racing game Gran Turismo Sport.

In 2018, their song "Higher was featured as menu soundtrack for the racing game Asphalt Legends Unite.

The song "It's Not This" by Bearson, featuring Lemaitre and josh pan, featured on the soundtrack for FIFA 19.

== Discography ==
=== Studio albums ===
- Chapter One
- Substellar

=== Extended plays ===
- The Friendly Sound
- Relativity 1
- Relativity 2
- Relativity 3
- Relativity By Nite
- Singularity
- 1749
- Afterglow
- Fast Lovers
- JGM
- RED
- BLUE

=== Non-album singles ===
Title	Duration	Artist(s)	Ref
"Momentum"	2:21	Lemaitre	
"Primeval Atom"	2:26	Lemaitre	
"Unclouded Judgment"	3:39	Lemaitre	
"Fossil Fuels"	4:10	Lemaitre	
"Come Again"	2:14	Lemaitre	
"Machine"	3:14	Lemaitre	
"Control" (feat. Jerry Folk)	3:02	Lemaitre, Jerry Folk	
"It's Not This"	3:10	Bearson, Lemaitre, josh pan	
"Day 4"	3:09	Lemaitre, Pretty Sister	

=== Remixes ===
Year	Artist	Track
2012	Lo-Fi-Fnk	"Kissing Taste"
2013	Porter Robinson, Mat Zo	"Easy"
2013	Netsky	"We Can Only Live Today (Puppy)"
2014	Martin Solveig	"Hey Now feat. Kyle"
2015	Uppermost	"Angels"
2015	Madeon, Passion Pit	"Pay No Mind"
2019	Electric Guest	"Dollar"
2025	Ella Marie	"Gii Gielista"

=== Guest appearances ===
Title	Year	Other performer(s)	Album
"Excuse Me"	2011	Various	Kitsuné Maison Compilation 12: The Good Fun Issue
"Dreamcatcher"	2013	Camo & Krooked	Zeitgeist
"Polygon Dust"	2014	Porter Robinson	Worlds
"Dancing on the Moon"	2017	Hotel Garuda	

== Music videos and filmography ==
Title	Year	Director(s)
"Unclouded Judgment"	2010	Johannes Greve Muskat (JGM)
"Come Again"	2010	Johannes Greve Muskat (JGM)
Across the Baltic	2011	Johannes Greve Muskat (JGM)
"Appreciate"	2012	Johannes Greve Muskat (JGM)
"Coffee Table"	2012	Johannes Greve Muskat (JGM)
"Sceptics"	2012	Johannes Greve Muskat (JGM)
"The End"	2012	Johannes Greve Muskat (JGM)
"Time to Realize"	2012	Johannes Greve Muskat (JGM)
"Keep Close"	2012	Johannes Greve Muskat (JGM)
"Continuum"	2013	Johannes Greve Muskat (JGM)
"Cut to Black"	2013	Johannes Greve Muskat (JGM)
"Fiction"	2013	Johannes Greve Muskat (JGM)
"Wait"	2014	Johannes Greve Muskat (JGM)
"Closer"	2015	Johannes Greve Muskat (JGM)
"Closer" [UK Version]	2015	Johannes Greve Muskat (JGM)
"We Got U"	2016	
"Big"	2018	
"Fast Lovers"	2019	
