= Rebel (TVXQ song) =

Single by TVXQ

from the album 20&2
- Language: Korean
- Released: December 26, 2023
- Genre: Dance-pop
- Length: 2:44
- Label: SM; Kakao
- Composers: Kenzie; Jonathan Gusmark; Ludvig Evers; Cazzi Opeia; Adrian McKinnon
- Lyricist: Kenzie
- Producers: Kenzie; Moonshine

TVXQ singles chronology
"Lime & Lemon" (2023)	"Rebel" (2023)

Music video
- "Rebel" on YouTube

"Rebel" is a song recorded by South Korean duo TVXQ. It was released through SM Entertainment on December 26, 2023, the day of their twentieth debut anniversary, as the lead single from their ninth studio album 20&2 (2023).

== Background and release ==
On October 5, 2023, SM Entertainment announced TVXQ would be returning in December 2023 with a new full-length studio album and a concert to commemorate their twentieth debut anniversary. They confirmed the new album would be titled 20&2, referring to TVXQ's twenty years since debut, and the two remaining members, U-Know Yunho and Max Changmin. Their last original Korean release was five years ago, with the EP New Chapter No. 2: The Truth of Love (2018). On December 12, SM confirmed that 20&2 would have ten tracks including the lead single "Rebel" produced by Kenzie, who also co-wrote their 2012 single "Humanoids". A preview of "Rebel" was first revealed on December 24 in an album tracklist preview. A music video teaser was released on December 25. The song was released alongside the album and its music video on December 26.

== Composition ==
"Rebel" was composed by Moonshine, Cazzi Opeia, Adrian McKinnon, and Kenzie, who also wrote the lyrics. Produced by Moonshine and Kenzie, the song was described as an energetic dance song with "a seamless blend of intense drum beats with heavy synth bass sounds", characterized by "dynamic vocals" and a "rhythmic track". The song's lyrics contain a potent message, stating, "A true rebel of an era is a person who steadfastly follows their convictions without being swayed." The beginning and chorus of "Rebel" also featured a sample of "Carol of the Bells", referring to the song and the group's anniversary being close to Christmas Day. "Rebel" was composed in the key of C# Major, with a tempo of 126 beats per minute.

== Music video ==
Directed by Ha Jung-hun and Lee Hye-sung, the music video was released on SM Entertainment's official YouTube channel at 6:00 PM KST on December 26, 2023. The video stars Yunho and Changmin as lab experiments with superhuman powers. They overpower their cages and break free. They then gather an army and start a rebellion.

"Rebel" is choreographed by Ingyoo Kim and EZ Twins.

== Promotion ==
TVXQ performed "Rebel" for the first time at the SBS Gayo Daejeon on December 25. They had their comeback performances on KBS's Music Bank on January 5, 2024, SBS's Inkigayo on January 7, and Mnet's M Countdown on January 11.

== Credits and personnel ==
Credits adapted from the album's liner notes.

Studio

- SM Big Shot Studio – recording
- SM SSAM Studio – digital editing
- 77F Studio – digital editing
- SM Blue Ocean Studio – mixing
- 821 Sound – mastering

Personnel

- SM Entertainment – executive producer
- TVXQ – vocals, background vocals
- Kenzie – producer, lyrics, composition, arrangement, vocal directing
- Jonatan Gusmark (Moonshine) – producer, composition, arrangement
- Ludvig Evers (Moonshine) – producer, composition, arrangement
- Moa "Cazzi Opeia" Carlebecker – composition, background vocals
- Adrian McKinnon – composition, background vocals
- Lee Min-kyu – recording
- Woo Min-jeong – digital editing
- Kang Eun-ji – digital editing
- Kim Cheol-sun – mixing
- Kwon Nam-woo – mastering

== Charts ==
Chart performance for "Rebel"
Chart (2023)	Peak position
South Korea Download (Circle)	38

== Release history ==
Release history for "Rebel"
Region	Date	Format	Label
Various	December 26, 2023	Digital download; streaming	SM; Kakao
