= Ghost (1984 film) =

1984 Japanese experimental short film

- Directed by: Takashi Ito
- Release date: 1984
- Running time: 6 minutes
- Country: Japan

Ghost is a 1984 Japanese experimental short film directed by Takashi Ito. As with Ito's shorts Thunder (1982) and Grim (1984), Ghost was shot in 16 mm, features long-exposure photography, and has been characterized as using light, sound, and photographic techniques to create an ominous atmosphere and invoke the feeling of a space haunted by a ghostly presence.

== Synopsis ==
Ghost depicts spaces in and around an apartment building, utilizing frame-by-frame long-exposure photography. A figure holding a flashlight is sometimes seen, with the beam of the flashlight appearing as a trail of light due to the long exposure; the figure itself appears weightless and fleeting.

According to Ito:

I made [Ghost] because I wanted to try out the idea of floating images in midair that had come to me when making Thunder. The entire work was shot frame-by-frame with long exposures. I filmed this in the company dorm I was living in, in the middle of the night after I had come home from work, and thought I might die from what had become my daily pattern of sleeping for two hours in the morning then going off to work.

== Release ==
Ghost screened on 24 September 1985 at RMIT University's Glasshouse Cinema at RMIT University in Melbourne, Australia, as part of "Continuum", a program of "Japanese alternative cinema made in 1984." It was later released on DVD along with a number of Ito's other works as part of the Takashi Ito Film Anthology.
