= Lime & Lemon =

- Digital cover

Single by Tohoshinki
- B-side: "Sentimental Mood"
- Released: June 12, 2023 (release history)
- Genre: J-pop
- Length: 3:10
- Label: Avex Trax

Tohoshinki singles chronology
"Parallel Parallel" (2023)	"Lime & Lemon" (2023)	"Rebel" (2023)

Music video
- "Lime & Lemon" on YouTube

"Lime & Lemon" is the 51st Japanese single by South Korean pop duo Tohoshinki, first digitally released by Avex Trax on June 12, 2023, and then as a CD single on June 28, 2023. "Lime & Lemon" was released in three physical CD versions, which included two separate limited edition A4 photobook editions and a fan club "board" edition released exclusively for Tohoshinki's Japanese fan club, Bigeast. Promoted as a summer single, "Lime & Lemon" is described as a dance pop track with house elements. The single debuted at number two on the Oricon Singles Chart and number forty on the Billboard Japan Hot 100.

== Background and promotion ==
Announced in May 2023, a snippet of "Lime & Lemon" was released on June 7, 2023, prior to its worldwide digital release on June 12, 2023, which was made available for stream and download at 6PM JST. The single's jacket images and tracklist was revealed on June 10. Avex shared the music video teaser for "Lime & Lemon" on June 17, 2023. The music video was officially released on June 19.

The CD single was officially released on June 28, 2023, and they promoted the release on Nippon TV's morning program DayDay. A limited amount of postcards were made available for those who purchased the CD single at various music stores.

The jacket-making and behind the scenes video of "Lime & Lemon" was posted on June 28, and a lyric video for the single's B-side track "Sentimental Mood" was released on June 29.

The song was selected to be the July ending theme song for Nippon TV's Sorette!? Jissai dounanoka (それって！？実際どうなの課; "What is That?").

== Commercial performance ==
"Lime & Lemon" debuted at number two on the Oricon Singles Chart with 27,929 copies sold. It was the tenth best-selling single for the month of February 2023, and sold 38,736 copies as of December 2023. On the Billboard Japan Hot 100, it debuted at number forty.

== Live performances ==
Tohoshinki debuted their performances of "Lime & Lemon" on TBS's CDTV Live on June 19 and on NHK's Utacon on June 20, 2023. They performed the song on Fuji TV's Music Fair on August 5, 2023.

== Formats and track listings ==
- Digital download and streaming
1. "Lime & Lemon" – 3:10
2. "Sentimental Mood" – 2:55
3. "Lime & Lemon -Less Vocal-" – 3:07
4. "Sentimental Mood -Less Vocal" – 2:55

CD single AVCK-79983, AVCK-79984, AVC1-79985

1. "Lime & Lemon"
2. "Sentimental Mood"
3. "Lime & Lemon -Less Vocal-"
4. "Sentimental Mood -Less Vocal"

== Charts ==
Chart (2022)	Peak position
Japan (Oricon Singles Chart)	2
Billboard Japan Hot 100	40

== Sales ==
Released	Oricon chart	Peak	Debut sales	Sales total
June 28, 2023	Weekly Singles Chart	2	27,929	35,915
June 28, 2023	Monthly Singles Chart (July)	12	35,740	35,915
June 28, 2023	Yearly Singles Chart (2023)	117	35,915	35,915

== Release history ==
Region	Date	Format	Version(s)	Label
Worldwide	June 12, 2023	Digital download; streaming	Original single	Avex Entertainment
South Korea	June 12, 2023	Digital download; streaming	Original single	S.M. Entertainment
Japan	June 28, 2023	Digital download; streaming; CD	EP	Avex Trax
Various	June 28, 2023	Digital download; streaming	EP	Avex Entertainment
