= Zonn =

Zonn may refer to:

- Andrea Zonn (born 1969), American singer and fiddle player
- Włodzimierz Zonn (1905–1975), Polish astronomer
- Zonn., taxonomic author abbreviation of Ben Zonneveld

== See also ==
- Zohn
- Zonn (disambiguation)
