= Zohn =

Zohn is a surname. Notable people with the surname include:

- Alejandro Zohn (1930–2000), Mexican architect
- Ethan Zohn (born 1973), American professional soccer player
- Ricardo Zohn-Muldoon (born 1962), Mexican-American composer and chair of the composition department at Eastman School of Music
- Shachne Zohn (1910–2012), Ukrainian born former dean of the Yeshiva Torah Vodaas, who later lived in Jerusalem
- Sheryl Zohn, American television writer and producer

See also

- Zohn Ahl, roll-and-move board game played by the Kiowa Indians of North America
- Zohn Nunataks, set of three nunataks, the largest being Cheeks Nunatak, rising to 1,310 m in the southwest part of Grossman Nunataks, Palmer Land

== See also ==
- Zahn, a surname
- Zon (disambiguation)
- Zonn (disambiguation)
