= Zoon (disambiguation) =

Zoon is a 1996 album by Nefilim.

- Zoon (band), a Canadian shoegaze artist
- zoon politikon, political animal in Aristotle
- zoon, a colonial organism. See zooid.

Zoon is the Dutch for "son", and is a surname. Notable people with the surname include:

- Jacques Zoon (born 1961), Dutch flutist
- Jan Zoon (1923–2016), Dutch politician and economist
- Jet Zoon (born 1988), Dutch accordionist and composer
- Kathryn Zoon (born before 1970), American immunologist
- Zoon Van Snook (born Alec Snook, active from 2007), Belgian-born English composer, producer and remixer
- Zoon (journal) an academic journal that was absorbed by Acta Zoologica

== See also ==
- Vader & Zoon, a Dutch newspaper gag-a-day comic strip by Peter van Straaten 1968–1987
- Verschoten & Zoon, a 1999 Belgian comedy TV series
- Zune, a multimedia player
