= Kyushu Institute of Design =

National university in Fukuoka, Japan

Coordinates: 33°33′38.6″N 130°25′48.2″E

- Kyūshū Geijutsu Kōka Daigaku
- Established: 1968
- Location: Fukuoka, Fukuoka, Japan
- Website: www.kyushu-id.ac.jp

Kyushu Institute of Design (九州芸術工科大学; Kyūshū Geijutsu Kōka Daigaku, KID) in Fukuoka, Japan, was one of Japan's national universities founded in April 1968. The university combined the disciplines of Architecture, Industrial Design, Visual Communication Design, Acoustic Design and Art and Information Design.

In October, 2003, Kyushu Institute of Design became Kyushu University's Graduate School of Design. Until 2005, however, all KID graduates have been issued diplomas from Kyushu Institute of Design.

== See also ==
- Kyushu Institute of Technology
- Kyushu University
- Kyoto University
- University of Tokyo
