= Complete Set Limited Box =

Compilation album by Tohoshinki
- Released: June 30, 2010
- Recorded: 2005 – 2009
- Genres: J-pop; dance-pop; R&B
- Language: Japanese
- Label: Rhythm Zone
- Producer: Max Matsuura

Tohoshinki chronology
Best Selection 2010 (2010)	Complete Set Limited Box (2010)	Keep Your Head Down (2011)

Complete: Single A-Side Collection

Single B-Side Collection

The Complete Set Limited Box is a box set released by South Korean pop group Tohoshinki. It is a series of two Japanese compilation albums released by the Avex sub-label Rhythm Zone on June 30, 2010, two months after former Tohoshinki members Jejung, Yuchun, and Junsu left the band to form JYJ. The first compilation album in the series, Complete: Single A-Side Collection, includes all A-side singles released by Tohoshinki since their Japanese debut in April 2005. The second album, the Single B-Side Collection, consists of twelve popular B-side tracks Tohoshinki released over the years. The two albums were compiled together in the exclusive Complete Set Limited Box, which was also released on June 30, 2010. The limited edition includes a 1,000-piece jigsaw puzzle.

The Complete album series marked the closing releases under their contract with Rhythm Zone.

== Chart performance ==
Complete: Single A-Side Collection debuted at number three on the weekly Oricon Albums Chart, selling 106,265 copies in sixteen weeks. Having shipped more than 100,000 copies, the album was certified gold in June 2010. The Single B-Side Collection debuted at number four on the same chart, selling 100,729 in thirteen weeks.

== Track listings ==
=== Complete: Single A-Side Collection ===
CD 1
No.	Title	Length
0.	"HUG" (International version)
1.	"Stay With Me Tonight"
2.	"Somebody To Love"
3.	"My Destiny"
4.	"Asu wa Kuru Kara"
5.	"Rising Sun"
6.	"Heart, Mind and Soul"
7.	"Begin"
8.	"Sky"
9.	"miss you"
10.	"'O'-Sei Han Gō"
11.	"Step by Step"
12.	"Choosey Lover"
13.	"Lovin' you"
14.	"Summer Dream"
15.	"Song for you"
16.	"Love in the Ice"

CD 2
No.	Title	Length
1.	"SHINE"
2.	"Ride On"
3.	"Forever Love"
4.	"Together"
5.	"Purple Line"
6.	"Two Hearts"
7.	"WILD SOUL" (Changmin solo)
8.	"Runaway"
9.	"My Girlfriend" (Yuchun solo)
10.	"If...!?"
11.	"Rainy Night" (Junsu solo)
12.	"Close to you"
13.	"Crazy Life" (Yunho solo)
14.	"Keyword"
15.	"Maze" (Jejung solo)

CD 3
No.	Title	Length
1.	"Beautiful you"
2.	"Sennen Koi Uta"
3.	"Dōshite Kimi o Suki ni Natte Shimattandarō?"
4.	"MIROTIC"
5.	"Bolero"
6.	"Kiss the Baby Sky"
7.	"Wasurenaide"
8.	"Survivor"
9.	"Share The World"
10.	"We Are!"
11.	"Stand by U"
12.	"BREAK OUT!"
13.	"Toki o Tomete"

=== Single B-Side Collection ===
No.	Title	Lyrics	Music	Length
1.	"Try My Love"	Masaya Wada; Kiyoshi Matsuo	Masaya Wada; Sawamoto Yoshimitsu	4:03
2.	"Kotoba wa Iranai"	Jun Tatsutano	Masaya Wada	4:35
3.	"Eternal"	Ryoji Sonoda	Kosuke Morimoto	4:35
4.	"The Way U Are" (Japanese version)	Hiroshi Yamada	Robert Zuddas; Hwang Seong-je	3:28
5.	"High Time"	jam	Masataka Kitaura	4:03
6.	"NO PAIN NO GAIN"	H.U.B.	Tatta Works	3:49
7.	"PROUD"	Ryoji Sonoda	Jin Nakamura	5:12
8.	"Gosenshi"	H.U.B.	velvetronica; AKIRA	4:59
9.	"Day Moon ～Harudal～"	H.U.B.	Kenzie	3:56
10.	"Box in the ship"	H.U.B.	Philippe-Marc Anquetil; Iain James Farqharson; Marcus Killian; Yacine Azeggagh; AILI	4:12
11.	"Take Your Hands"	Ryoji Sonoda	Steve Smith; Anthony Anderson; Jenson David Aubrey Vaughan; Creig Smart	3:21
12.	"Tea for Two"	H.U.B.	Ichiro Fujiya; Manao Doi	4:39
Total length:				50:52

== Charts ==
Chart (2010)	Peak position	
Chart (2010)	A-Side	B-Side
Japanese Albums Chart (Oricon)	3	4
South Korean Albums Chart (Gaon)	8	7
Taiwanese Albums Chart (G-Music)	12	18

== Certifications ==
Region	Certification	Certified units/sales
Japan (RIAJ)	Gold	100,000^{^}
^{^} Shipments figures based on certification alone.

== Release history ==
Region	Date	Format(s)	Label
Japan	June 30, 2010	CD	rhythm zone
South Korea	July 9, 2010	CD	S.M. Entertainment
Taiwan	July 9, 2010	CD	Avex Taiwan
Hong Kong	July 15, 2010	CD	Avex Asia
