= Best Selection 2010 =

Greatest hits album by Tohoshinki
- Released: February 17, 2010
- Recorded: 2005–2009
- Genres: J-pop, dance-pop, R&B
- Language: Japanese
- Label: SM Entertainment Japan/Rhythm Zone
- Producer: Max Matsuura

Tohoshinki chronology
The Secret Code (2009)	Best Selection 2010 (2010)	Complete Set Limited Box (2010)

Singles from Best Selection 2010
- 1. "Share the World/We Are!" Released: April 22, 2009; 2. "Stand by U" Released: July 1, 2009; 3. "Break Out!" Released: January 27, 2010; 4. "Toki o Tomete" Released: March 24, 2010; 5. "With All My Heart" Released: April 14, 2010; 6. "Amaku Hateshinaku" Released: April 21, 2010

Best Selection 2010 is the first Japanese greatest hits album from South Korean pop group Tohoshinki, released in Japan on February 17, 2010, by Rhythm Zone. It contains songs from their albums Heart, Mind and Soul (2006), Five in the Black (2007), T (2008) and The Secret Code (2009). It also features four new singles, two of which are certified platinum by the Recording Industry Association of Japan (RIAJ). Best Selection 2010 is the final album release by the group with its original five-member lineup.

Three editions of the album were available: a 2-CD+DVD version, a CD+DVD version, and a CD only version. Best Selection 2010 was the group's first album to reach number one on the Oricon Albums Chart, and is the first album by a foreign band to have first-week sales of 400,000 copies in Japan. Best Selection 2010 was certified 2× Platinum by the RIAJ and is the best-selling album of Tohoshinki's career. It is also the best-selling greatest hits album by a foreign artist in Japan.

== Chart performance ==
Best Selection 2010 debuted at number-one on the Oricon Daily Album Chart, selling over 228,000 copies on the first day. The album maintained its position atop the Daily Chart for seven consecutive days and ranked at number one on the Oricon Weekly Album Chart with an accumulated 412,861 copies sold by the end of its first week, overtaking the Backstreet Boys and Bon Jovi, who held the number one and number two positions on the chart respectively prior to Best Selection 2010's release. With this, Best Selection 2010 became the group's first number one album in Japan. They broke a 14-year record for the highest first-week sales by a foreign group in the country, formerly set by American rock band Bon Jovi's sixth studio album These Days with 379,000 copies sold. Tohoshinki's record was broken 10 years later, in 2020, by fellow South Korean group BTS, who sold over 564,000 copies of their third Japanese studio album Map of the Soul: 7 – The Journey in its first week.

On March 11, 2010, Best Selection 2010 was certified Double Platinum by the Recording Industry Association of Japan (RIAJ) for shipping over 500,000 copies. On December 20, 2010, Oricon reported the Yearly Album Chart for 2010 and Best Selection 2010 ranked seventh on the list with a total sales of 569,530 copies, making it the highest selling album by a foreign group at the time.

After only two days of release in the Philippine market, Best Selection 2010 landed on the number one spot in Astrovision and Astroplus's Overall & International Album Chart. It outsold albums by Justin Bieber, Lady Gaga, Taylor Swift & the Glee soundtrack. This was Tohoshinki's first number one album in the country.

== Track listing ==
CD 1
No.	Title	Length
1.	"Jumon: Mirotic"
2.	"Share the World"
3.	"My Destiny"
4.	"Dōshite Kimi o Suki ni Natte Shimattandarō?"
5.	"Purple Line" (from album T)
6.	"Stand by U"
7.	"Stay With Me Tonight"
8.	"Asu wa Kuru Kara" (明日は来るから "Tomorrow Will Surely Come")
9.	""O" (Sei Han Gō)" ("O"-正・反・合)
10.	"Sky"
11.	"Somebody to Love"
12.	"Lovin' You" (from album T)
13.	"Rising Sun"
14.	"Summer Dream"
15.	"Bolero"
16.	"Begin"

CD 2: Member's choice
No.	Title	Length
1.	"Forever Love" (Junsu's Selection)
2.	"Shine" (Yuchun's Selection)
3.	"Love in the Ice" (Jaejoong's Selection)
4.	"Beautiful You" (Changmin's Selection)
5.	"Hug" (Yunho's Selection, from album Heart, Mind and Soul)
6.	"Amaku Hateshinaku" (甘く果てしなく "Endlessly Sweet")
7.	"Toki o Tomete"
8.	"With All My Heart (Kimi ga Odoru, Natsu)" (With All My Heart ~君が踊る、夏~)
9.	"Break Out!"

DVD (CD+DVD version): <Tohoshinki Karaoke Selection>
No.	Title	Length
1.	"Share the World (MV)"
2.	"どうして君を好きになってしまったんだろう? (4th Live Tour ver.)"
3.	"呪文: Mirotic (4th Live Tour ver.)"
4.	"Bolero (4th Live Tour ver.)"
5.	"Summer Dream (3rd Live Tour ver.)"
6.	"Stand by U (MV Member ver.)"
7.	"Rising Sun (2nd Live Tour ver.)"
8.	"Love in the Ice (3rd Live Tour ver)."
9.	"Break Out! (Bonus MV)"

DVD (2CD+DVD version): <Live Digest> (1st Tour - 4th Tour)
No.	Title	Length
1.	"Trick"
2.	"Rising Sun"
3.	""O"-正.反.合."
4.	"Stay with Me Tonight"
5.	"Choosey Lover"
6.	"Begin"
7.	"Hug"
8.	"明日は来るから"
9.	"Zion"
10.	"Zion"
11.	"Break up the shell"
12.	"High Time"
13.	"Purple Line"
14.	"呪文: Mirotic"
15.	"The Way U Are"
16.	"Survivor"
17.	"Somebody to Love"
18.	"Offshot Movie (first press limited)"
Total length:		1:10:00

== Charts ==
=== Weekly charts ===
Chart (2010)	Peak position
Japanese Albums (Oricon)	1
Japanese Top Albums (Billboard)	1

=== Monthly charts ===
Chart (2010)	Peak position
Japanese Albums (Oricon)	1

=== Year-end charts ===
Chart (2010)	Position
Japanese Albums (Oricon)	7
South Korean Albums (Gaon)	72

== Sales and certifications ==
Sales and certifications for Best Selection 2010
Region	Certification	Certified units/sales
Japan (RIAJ)	2× Platinum	569,530
