= The Secret Code (album) =

Studio album by Tohoshinki
- Released: March 25, 2009
- Recorded: 2008–2009
- Studios: Avex (Tokyo); SM Booming System (Seoul)
- Genres: J-pop; dance-pop; R&B
- Length: 52:49
- Language: Japanese
- Label: Rhythm Zone
- Producers: Masato "Max" Matsuura; Ryuhei Chiba; Lee Soo-man; Beatardz; The Conglomerate; Robert Habolin; Yoo Young-jin

Tohoshinki chronology
Mirotic (2008)	The Secret Code (2009)	Best Selection 2010 (2010)

Singles from The Secret Code
- 1. "Beautiful You/Sennen Koi Uta" Released: April 23, 2008; 2. "Dōshite Kimi o Suki ni Natte Shimattandarō?" Released: July 16, 2008; 3. "Jumon: Mirotic" Released: October 15, 2008; 4. "Bolero/Kiss the Baby Sky/Wasurenaide" Released: January 21, 2009; 5. "Survivor" Released: March 17, 2009

Professional ratings
Review scores
Source	Rating
Allmusic	3/5 stars

The Secret Code is the fourth Japanese studio album (eighth overall) by South Korean pop group Tohoshinki, released on March 25, 2009 by Rhythm Zone. The album debuted at number two on the Oricon weekly chart. The Secret Code is Tohoshinki's last original studio album to feature members Jejung, Yuchun, and Junsu.

== Chart performance ==
In Japan, The Secret Code debuted at number two on the Oricon daily charts selling nearly 83,000 copies. On the weekly chart the album took the number two spot selling over 157,900 copies, behind pop singer Ayumi Hamasaki's Next Level. The album seemed even more successful in Taiwan. On the J-Pop and Combo charts the album debuted at number-one, bringing in 51.1% and 12.09% of sales on their respective charts.

== Singles ==
The first single that was released from the album was the double A-side, "Beautiful You/Sennen Koi Uta", on April 23, 2008. The single debuted at number-one on the Oricon singles charts. The second single was "Dōshite Kimi o Suki ni Natte Shimattandarō?", which was released on July 16, 2008. The third single was "Jumon: Mirotic", which was a Japanese language version of their lead single from their fourth Korean studio album with the same name. Two singles were released in 2009: the triple A-side "Bolero/Kiss the Baby Sky/Wasurenaide" and the last single from the album, "Survivor". All of the singles were number-ones for the group except "Survivor", which came in at number three on the Oricon chart.

== Track listing ==
The Secret Code track listing
No.	Title	Lyrics	Music	Arrangement	Length
1.	"Secret Game"	H.U.B	Akira	Akira	2:04
2.	"Force"	H.U.B	Adam Royce; Adolphus; Jason Gill	The Beatardz	3:45
3.	"Why Did I Have to End Up Falling Completely in Love with You?" (どうして君を好きになってしまったんだろう？ (Dōshite Kimi o Suki ni Natte Shimattandarō?))	Shinjiroh Inoue (Lambsey); Yuki Yamashita (Lambsey)	Fredrik "Fredro" Odesjo; Sylvia Bennett-Smith; Mats Berntoft	Murlyn Music Group	3:18
4.	"Nobody Knows"	H.U.B	Nao Tanaka	Nao Tanaka	3:58
5.	"Beautiful You"	H.U.B	Steve Smith (SA TrackWorks); Anthony Anderson (SA TrackWorks); Joleen Belle	SA TrackWorks; Joleen Belle; Shinjiroh Inoue (Lambsey)	4:37
6.	"Don't Forget (忘れないで, Wasurenaide)"	Hero Jaejoong	Hero Jaejoong; Young-hu Kim	Young-hu Kim	5:19
7.	"9095"	H.U.B	Hero Jaejoong	Hero Jaejoong	3:43
8.	"Mirotic" (呪文 (Jumon, Magic Spell))	Yoo Young-jin; Ryoji Sonoda	Mikkel Sigvardt; Lucas Secon; Thomas Troelsen	Yoo Young-jin	3:28
9.	"Taxi"	Shinjiroh Inoue (Lambsey)	Nao Tanaka	Nao Tanaka	5:31
10.	"Stand Up!"	H.U.B	Jan Kask; Luciano Peirone; Peter Mansson	Jan Kask; Luciano Peirone; Peter Mansson	3:59
11.	"Survivor"	H.U.B	Iain James; Robert "Deadbeat" Habolin; Adam Powers	YU; Robert "Deadbeat" Habolin	3:13
12.	"Kiss the Baby Sky"	Micky Yoochun	Micky Yoochun	Micky Yoochun; Shinjiroh Inoue (Lambsey)	3:50
13.	"Bolero"	Shinjiroh Inoue (Lambsey); Yuki Yamashita (Lambsey)	Daisuke Suzuki; Keiichi Tomita	Daisuke Kahara	6:04
Total length:					52:49

The Secret Code CD only version additional track list
No.	Title	Lyrics	Music	Arrangement	Length
14.	"Purple Line" (Bonus track)	Yoo Young-jin; Ryoji Sonoda	Yoo Young-jin; Yoo Han-jin; JJ650	Yoo Young-jin; Lee Soo-man	3:13
15.	"Why Did I Have to End Up Falling Completely in Love with You?" (どうして君を好きになってしまったんだろう？ (Dōshite Kimi o Suki ni Natte Shimattandarō?)) (Acapella version) (bonus track)	Shinjiroh Inoue (Lambsey); Yuki Yamashita (Lambsey)	Fredrik "Fredro" Odesjo; Sylvia Bennett-Smith; Mats Berntoft	Shinichiro Murayama	3:18
16.	"9096" (Hidden track)	H.U.B	Hero Jaejoong	Hero Jaejoong	3:43
Total length:					61:47

The Secret Code 2CD+DVD version CD 2 track list
No.	Title	Lyrics	Music	Arrangement	Length
14.	"9096" (Hidden track)	H.U.B	Hero Jaejoong	Hero Jaejoong	3:43
Total length:					3:43

The Secret Code 2CD version CD 2 track list (Non-Stop Mix)
No.	Title	Lyrics	Music	Arrangement	Length
1.	"Shine"	H.U.B	Nishikawa Reo	Akira	4:32
2.	"Close to You"	H.U.B	Akira	Akira	2:49
3.	"Zion"	H.U.B	Iain James; Christopher Lee-Joe; Curtis Richardson; Rob Davis	Tommy Henriksen	3:02
4.	"Wild Soul" (Max Changmin solo)	Ryoji Sonoda	corin.	corin.	2:27
5.	"Purple Line"	Yoo Young-jin; Ryoji Sonoda	Yoo Young-jin; Yoo Han-jin; JJ650	Yoo Young-jin; Lee Soo-man	2:51
6.	"Runaway"	H.U.B	Akira	Akira	3:06
7.	"Last Angel" (TVXQ version)	Koda Kumi; H.U.B	Negin Djafari; Ian-Paolo Lira; Hugo Lira; Thomas G:son	Negin Djafari; Ian-Paolo Lira; Hugo Lira; Thomas G:son	3:46
8.	"Two Hearts"	H.U.B	Akira	Akira	3:43
9.	"Rainy Night" (Xiah Junsu solo)	H.U.B	Xiah Junsu	Micky Yoochun; H-Wonder	3:03
10.	"Darkness Eyes"	Ryoji Sonoda	Tommy Henriksen	Tommy Henriksen	3:46
11.	"Lovin' You"	H.U.B	Mikio Sakai	Mikio Sakai	5:52
12.	"Keyword"	H.U.B	Akira	Akira	3:13
13.	"No?"	H.U.B	Dane Deviller (Sean & Dave); Sean Hosein (Sean & Dave); Steve Smith (SA TrackWorks); Anthony Anderson (SA TrackWorks); Ibrahim Lakhani	Sean & Dave; SA TrackWorks; Ibrahim Lakhani	3:44
14.	"My Girlfriend" (Micky Yoochun solo)	Micky Yoochun	Jun Suyama	Jun Suyama	2:56
15.	"If...!?"	H.U.B	Akira	Akira	3:29
16.	"Dead End"	H.U.B	Paul Drew (DWB Music); Greig Watts (DWB Music); Pete Barringer (DWB Music)	DWB Music	3:17
17.	"Clap!"	H.U.B	Fredrik "Figge" Boström	Fredrik "Figge" Boström	3:15
18.	"Crazy Life" (U-Know Yunho solo)	H.U.B	Christopher Lee-Joe (BNA Productions); Philipe-Marc Anquetil (BNA Productions); Marcus Johnson	BNA Productions; Marcus Johnson	3:10
19.	"Ride on"	H.U.B	Christopher Lee-Joe (BNA Productions); Philipe-Marc Anquetil (BNA Productions); Iain James	BNA Productions	3:28
20.	"Choosey Lover"	Yoko Hiji	Ryuichiro Yamaki	Ryuichiro Yamaki	3:11
21.	"Trick"	H.U.B	Akira	Akira	4:27
22.	"Maze" (Hero Jaejoong solo)	Ryoji Sonoda	Ichiro Fujiya	tasuku	4:17
Total length:					71:14

The Secret Code 2CD+DVD version CD 2 track list
No.	Title	Lyrics	Music	Arrangement	Length
1.	"We Are!" (ウィーアー！)	Shoko Fujibayashi	Kōhei Tanaka	Akira	3:37
2.	"Take Your Hands: I.Am.Electro Remix"	Ryoji Sonoda	Steve Smith (SA TrackWorks); Anthony Anderson (SA TrackWorks); Jenson David Aubrey Vaughan; Craig Smart	Star Wax for THE ULTRA☆MEN	3:04
3.	"Box in the Ship"	H.U.B	Philipe-Marc Anquetil (BNA Productions); Iain James; Marcus Killian Thompson; Yacine Azeggagh	AILI	4:14
4.	"One Thousand Year Love Song" (千年恋歌 (Sennen Koi Uta)) (Japanese version)	Lim Bo-kyung; H.U.B	Joe Hisaishi	Maestro-T	4:01
5.	"Purple Line" (Bonus track)	Yoo Young-jin; Ryoji Sonoda	Yoo Young-jin; Yoo Han-jin; JJ650	Yoo Young-jin; Lee Soo-man	3:13
Total length:					18:09

DVD
No.	Title	Length
1.	"Purple Line"
2.	"Beautiful You"
3.	"Dōshite Kimi o Suki ni Natte Shimattandarō?"
4.	"Jumon: Mirotic"
5.	"Bolero"
6.	"Survivor"
7.	"Kiss the Baby Sky"
8.	"Footage from the 3rd Live Tour 2008: T"

DVD: First Press
No.	Title	Length
9.	"Cover photoshoot"
10.	"Kiss the Baby Sky PV"

== Charts ==
Chart (2009)	Peak position
Japanese Albums (Oricon)	2
Taiwanese Combo Albums (G-Music)	1
Taiwanese J-pop Albums (G-Music)	1

== Sales and certifications ==
Region	Certification	Certified units/sales
Japan (RIAJ)	Platinum	317,699
