= Wild Soul (disambiguation) =

"Wild Soul" is a song by Cristina Scarlat.

Wild Soul may also refer to:

- Corazón salvaje (1993 TV series) (Wild Soul), a Mexican telenovela
- "Wild Soul", a song by Tohoshinki, B-side of "Two Hearts"
