= Mimi (TV series) =

2014 South Korean television series

- Promotional poster
- Genre: Romance, Mystery, Horror
- Based on: M by Lee Myung-se
- Written by: Seo Yoo-sun
- Directed by: Song Chang-soo
- Starring: Shim Chang-min; Moon Ka-young
- Country of origin: South Korea
- Original language: Korean
- No. of episodes: 4

Production
- Production location: Korea
- Running time: Fridays at 23:00 (KST)
- Production companies: SM C&C, CJ E&M

Original release
- Network: Mnet
- Release: 21 February – 14 March 2014

Mimi (Korean: 미미) is a 2014 South Korean television series starring Shim Chang-min and Moon Ka-young. It aired on cable channel Mnet from February 21 to March 14, 2014, on Fridays at 23:00 for 4 episodes.

The horror/mystery/romance drama is inspired by the 2007 Lee Myung-se film M.

== Plot ==
Min-woo is a 28-year-old introverted writer of webtoons who has partial memory loss. One day, he finds a memo on his desk calendar, and because of it, writes a new webtoon titled December 8, which becomes an instant hit. But as the webtoon gets even more popular, Min-woo feels pressure from work and begins to suffer from severe headaches. He strives to recover his lost memories from the time he was an 18-year-old high school student, especially those of his first love, Mimi, as he unravels their mysterious fate.

== Cast ==
- Shim Chang-min as Han Min-woo
- Moon Ga-young as Mimi
- Shin Hyun-been as Jang Eun-hye
- Jung Ji-soon as team leader of manhwa department
- Yoon Da-kyung as Min-woo's mother
- Go Won as Min-woo's homeroom teacher
- Choi Young-soo as Sung-woo
- Kim Joon-goo as punishment soldier
- Lee Yeon-kyung as Mimi's aunt
- Byun Baek-hyun as Umbrella man

== Soundtrack ==
The official theme of the series, Because I Love You, was performed by Wendy (Son Seung-wan) who later would debut in now-popular girl-group Red Velvet along other SM rookies, Kang Seulgi and Bae Joohyun (Irene).

== International broadcast ==
It aired in Thailand on PPTV beginning March 15, 2015, dubbed as Patitin Rak Raek Pob. ("ปฏิทินรักแรกพบ", literally: Love at First Sight Calendar).
