= Break Out! (Tohoshinki song) =

Single by Tohoshinki

from the album Best Selection 2010
- B-side: "Xiahtic" (Junsu solo)
- Released: January 27, 2010
- Recorded: 2009
- Genre: Pop, dance-pop
- Label: SM Entertainment Japan/Rhythm Zone
- Producer(s): Max Matsuura

Tohoshinki singles chronology
"Stand by U" (2009)	"Break Out!" (2010)	"Toki o Tomete" (2010)

"Break Out!" is a Japanese-language song by Tohoshinki. It was the group's 29th Japanese single, released in Japan on January 27, 2010 by Avex Group's sublabel Rhythm Zone. It was later included in their first Japanese compilation album, Best Selection 2010. It was used as the drama Tomehane! Suzuri Kōkō Shodōbu's theme song. The single debuted on top of the Oricon daily chart with 169,842 copies sold. Altogether it sold 255,917 copies, topping the monthly chart as well, first time in the band's history. It also broke the previous record for a single of most copies sold in the first week of release held by Elton John.

== Track listing ==
=== CD only version ===
==== CD ====
1. "Break Out!" (3:59)
2. "Xiahtic" (Junsu solo) (4:30)
3. "Break Out!" -New Jack Swing mix- (4:45)
4. "Break Out!" (Less Vocal) (3:58)
5. "Xiahtic" (Junsu solo) (Less Vocal) (4:28)

=== CD + DVD (first press edition version) ===
==== CD ====
1. "Break Out!" (3:59)
2. "Xiahtic" (Junsu solo) (4:30)
3. "Break Out!" (Less Vocal) (3:58)
4. "Xiahtic" (Junsu solo) (Less Vocal) (4:28)

==== DVD ====
1. "Break Out!" (PV)
2. "Break Out!" Offshoot movie

=== CD + DVD version ===
==== CD ====
1. "Break Out!" (3:59)
2. "Xiahtic" (Junsu solo) (4:30)
3. "Break Out!" (Less Vocal) (3:58)
4. "Xiahtic" (Junsu solo) (Less Vocal) (4:28)

==== DVD ====
1. "Break Out!" (PV)
