= SMT House =

Restaurant in Cheongdam, Seoul

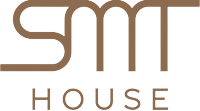

- SMT Seoul building at night
- Interactive map of SMT House

Restaurant information
- Established: January 27, 2016
- Owner: SM F&B Development
- Location: 125-24, Cheongdam-dong (58, Apgujeong-ro 79-gil), Gangnam District, Seoul, South Korea
- Coordinates: 37.5253°N 127.0520°E

SMT House (stylized as SMT HOUSE), commonly referred to as SMT Seoul, is a restaurant in Cheongdam-dong, Gangnam District, Seoul, owned by SM F&B Development, a subsidiary of SM Entertainment. The restaurant has five stories, each of which has different style and concept. The first and second floors offer a space for lunch, desserts and café in the daytime and for Spanish tapas restaurant at night. On the 3rd and 4th floors (which require reservations) diners can order a one course specialty called, "Seoul Tapas Style."

== History ==
SMT Seoul marks SM Entertainment's third endeavor at entering the food market. Previously, the company opened the Korean restaurant project ETable in Seoul but closed its doors in 2011 and Podonamu in Tokyo. In 2009, SM ventured into opening a pub in collaboration with the local hamburger joint Kraze, the Chi Mc, but the project failed. A spokesperson from SM stated the company had already possessed the know-how with the franchise after having several test-runs previously in the restaurant business. On January 19, 2016, SM announced opening a multi-dining space named SMT Seoul under SM F&B Development on January 21. The complex dining space is a casual dining and fine dining restaurant based on tapas menus, allowing visitors to experience a "different dining culture".

At 6 PM of January 27, 2016, SM Entertainment Group held a grand opening party in SMT Seoul located at Cheongdam-dong, Gangnam District, Seoul. It marked the beginning of the multi-dining space business. Executives from SM attended the ribbon-cutting ceremony to celebrate the opening, including executive producer Lee Soo-man, Kim Young-min, Kim Min-jong, Kangta, and BoA. In addition, artists from SM, including Super Junior, Girls' Generation, Exo, and Red Velvet, along with celebrities from SM Culture & Contents, attended the event. SM also announced its plan to open restaurant branches such as SMT Tokyo in Japan and SMT LA in the United States.

== Design ==
Each floor consists of a space with a particular concept; The Playground on the first and second floors operates as a lunch and dessert café in the morning and a casual tapas restaurant in the evening. After 10 PM KST (UTC+09:00) on Thursdays, Fridays, and Saturdays, the space will transform into a DJ-invited lounge. It is expected that it "satisfies both the mouth and the eyes" as it transforms into an "inviting lounge to provide unique pleasure", as well as a space to see various contents such as ceiling media images and SM Entertainment artists' holograms. The Penthouse on the third and fourth floors, which is operated on a pre-booking basis, employs the concept of Seoul Style Tapas to the course menu. The space will be showing a "unique dining culture" where visitors can taste menus from around the world such as Korean, Chinese, Japanese, and Western food when ordering the course. The fifth floor is composed of the Vertical Garden, allowing visitors to relax in the city center while adding variety. In addition, the restaurant introduces the "highest level" of audio & media sound facilities and soundproofing facilities according to the function of the space by floor, an oxygen generator and a water vein breaker, and a heating and cooling system. In winter, rooms use the ondol principle and provide a cool space without air conditioning, similar to a wine cellar cave in a winery in summer.

== Accolades ==
Name of publisher, year listed, and award of SMT House
Publisher	Year	Award	Ref.
Wine Spectator	2017	Award of Excellence	
Wine Spectator	2018	Award of Excellence	
