= Devil (EP) =

- Digital cover

EP by Max Changmin
- Released: January 13, 2022
- Recorded: 2021
- Studios: Butterfly (Seoul); SM Booming System (Seoul); SM LVYIN (Seoul); SM SSAM (Seoul); SM Yellow Tail (Seoul)
- Genre: K-pop
- Length: 19:46
- Language: Korean
- Labels: SM; Dreamus
- Producers: Lee Soo-man; Yoo Young-jin

Max Changmin chronology
Human (2021)	Devil (2022)

Singles from Devil
- 1. "Devil" Released: January 13, 2022

Devil is the second extended play by South Korean singer Max Changmin. It was released on January 13, 2022, by SM Entertainment. The EP contains six tracks including the lead single of the same name. The physical album is available in two photobook versions.

== Background and release ==
On December 28, 2021, SM Entertainment announced that Max would release his second solo EP in January 2022.

On January 3, 2022, the release date of Devil was announced as January 13, 2022.

== Composition ==
The title song “Devil” is a slow R&B song that blends groovy drums, grand bass riffs and heavy a cappella chorus to create an overwhelming atmosphere featuring Max's colourful ad-libs and delicate vocal techniques that express the exploding emotions. The lyrics written by Max is said to be enough to feel the intense charisma with the will to move forward confidently without giving in to the devil's whispers even in a difficult reality.

== Track listing ==
Devil track listing
No.	Title	Lyrics	Music	Arrangement	Length
1.	"Devil"	Changmin	Alexander Holmgren; Jay Birch	Holmgren; Birch	3:33
2.	"Maniac"	danke (lalala Studio)	Pete Kirtley; Andrew Murray; Sam Roman	Kirtley; Murray; Roman	3:15
3.	"Fever"	Yoo Young-jin	Yoo Young-jin	Yoo Young-jin	4:06
4.	"Alien"	Changmin	Mike Aljadeff; Kenneth McGregory Sharpless II	Aljadeff	3:13
5.	"Dirty Dancing"	Choi Jae-yeon (Jam Factory)	David Strääf; Alexander Mood; Mimmi Gyltman; Efraim Leo	Strääf	2:44
6.	"Airplane Mode"	Lee Yi-jin (153/Joombas)	Mich Hansen; Birk Preisler Plagborg Bønløkke; Emelie Hollow; Alex Stacey	Cutfather; Birk B	2:55
Total length:					19:46

== Charts ==
=== Weekly charts ===
Weekly chart performance for Devil
Chart (2022)	Peak position
Japanese Albums (Oricon)	17
Japanese Hot Albums (Billboard Japan)	13
South Korean Albums (Gaon)	7

=== Monthly charts ===
Monthly chart performance for Devil
Chart (2022)	Peak position
South Korean Albums (Gaon)	25

== Release history ==
Release history for Devil
Region	Date	Format	Label
Various	January 13, 2022	Digital download; streaming	SM
South Korea	January 13, 2022	CD	SM; Dreamus
