= Mirotic (song) =

2008 single by TVXQ

- Japanese single cover

Single by TVXQ

from the album Mirotic / The Secret Code
- Language: Korean; Japanese
- Released: September 26, 2008 (KR); October 15, 2008 (JP)
- Recorded: 2008
- Genre: K-pop; J-pop; synthpop; dance-pop
- Length: 3:28
- Label: SM; Rhythm Zone (JP); Avex (TW)
- Composers: Yoo Young-jin; Remee; Lucas Secon; Thomas Troelsen
- Lyricists: Yoo Young-jin (Korean); Ryoji Sonoda (Japanese)
- Producer: Yoo Young-jin

TVXQ singles chronology
"Balloons" (2006)	"Mirotic" (2008)	"Wrong Number" (2008)

Tohoshinki singles chronology
"Dōshite Kimi o Suki ni Natte Shimattandarō?" (2008)	"Mirotic" (2008)	"Bolero / Kiss the Baby Sky / Wasurenaide" (2009)

Music video
- "Mirotic" on YouTube

"Mirotic" (Korean: 주문, Jumun; Japanese: 呪文, Jumon, lit. "Magic Spell") is a song recorded by South Korean boy band TVXQ. It was released in South Korea on September 26, 2008 by SM Entertainment as part of the band's eponymous fourth studio album, Mirotic (2008). The Japanese version was released on October 15, 2008 as their third single from their fourth Japanese studio album, The Secret Code (2009).

The song was written by Mikkel Sigvardt, Lucas Secon, Thomas Troelsen, and Yoo Young-jin, who also produced the song. The Korean lyrics were written by Yoo, with Japanese lyrics translated by Ryoji Sonoda.

"Mirotic" was a commercial and critical success, reaching number one in several countries. The single peaked at number one on Japan's Oricon Singles Chart and was certified gold in both digital sales and physical shipments by the RIAJ. "Mirotic" is hailed by music critics as one of the greatest songs in the history of K-pop. Both Billboard and Rolling Stone named it as one of the best boy band songs of all time. It has reportedly received over 4,100,000 digital downloads in South Korea, making it the group's most downloaded single in the country. Two accompanying music videos were made available in support of the single's release in both regions.

== Background and release ==
"Mirotic" was released as the title track for the group's fourth studio album of the same name on September 26, 2008, via SM Entertainment. In Japan, the single "Jumon: Mirotic" was released via Avex Trax's subsidiary label Rhythm Zone on October 15, 2008. It was physically distributed in three versions: a standard CD, a fanclub special edition CD and a limited edition CD + DVD bundle. The release includes the instrumental version of the song along with a remixed version of "Dōshite Kimi o Suki ni Natte Shimattandarō".

On October 16, 2008, a fanclub event titled "Mirotic Party" was held to commemorate the release of the single. It was held at a club in Tokyo and was limited to only members of Tohoshinki's official fanclub.

Following the release of "Mirotic", controversy arose due to the song being nearly identical to "Under My Skin" by German singer Sarah Connor. SM Entertainment revealed shortly afterwards that the team who originally composed the song sold its copyrights to both TVXQ and Sarah Connor in January 2008.

== Critical reception ==
"Mirotic" experienced commercial success in both South Korea and Japan. The track has reportedly garnered 4,173,225 downloads in South Korea, making it the group's best-selling single in the country. In the first week of its release in Japan, it recorded sales of 71,000 copies and achieved top position on the weekly Oricon singles ranking in the chart issue dated October 27, 2008, becoming their fourth number-one single. It was certified gold by the Recording Industry Association of Japan (RIAJ) for physical shipments of over 100,000 units in December 2008 and for digital downloads in July 2014. On the Billboard Japan Hot 100, "Jumon: Mirotic" peaked at number seven in the week of October 22, 2008.

"Mirotic" on critic lists
Publisher	List	Rank	Ref.
Billboard	The 100 Greatest Boy Band Songs of All Time	41	
The Dong-a Ilbo	Best Male Idol Songs in the Past 20 Years	4	
The Forty-Five	The 45 best K-pop songs of all time	10	
Melon	Top 100 K-pop Songs of All Time	10	
Marie Claire	35 Essential K-pop Songs	—	
Music Y	120 Best Dance Tracks of All Time	20	
Rolling Stone	75 Greatest Boy Band Songs of All Time	39	
Rolling Stone	100 Greatest Songs in the History of Korean Pop Music	25	

== Music video ==
The music video was filmed on the end of August 2008 nearby Seoul, South Korea by Cho Soo-hyun (조수현) and premiered on September 21, 2008, after five days the teaser released. Later, it was premiered the Japanese version on September 27, 2008, with the alternate clips of the original video. There are also other versions of the video: the dance version and the solo versions of the members.

The music video features all the members walking when they are pulled by a sorceress in red and white. They are then shown in different scenarios, whereas: Hero Jaejoong is tied with rope handcuffs on a wall, U-Know Yunho is bound by ribbons around his wrists, Micky Yoochun is encased in glass, Xiah Junsu is trapped in lasers and Max Changmin is in water. There is also a dance scene in a room with a huge round light at the ceiling's center. In the end of the video, the members managed to break and escape their bindings and chase the sorceress who lost her power. The sorceress in turn attempts to escape as she slowly melts and then fades away as they slowly approach her. The eyes of the members start glowing whitish-green at the end of the music video.

== Track listing ==
Japanese CD single

1. "Jumon: Mirotic" (呪文: Mirotic, lit. Magic Spell: Mirotic)
2. "Dōshite Kimi o Suki ni Natte Shimattandarō: The Level Remix" (どうして君を好きになってしまったんだろう？:The Level Remix)
3. "Jumon: Mirotic (karaoke)" (呪文: Mirotic (Less Vocal))

Japanese DVD tracklist

1. "Jumon: Mirotic (Video Clip)" (呪文: Mirotic (Video Clip))
2. "Off Shot Movie"

== Credits and personnel ==
Credits adapted from the album's liner notes.

Studio

- SM Booming System – recording, mixing
- Sonic Korea – mastering

Personnel

- SM Entertainment – executive producer
- Lee Soo-man – producer
- TVXQ – vocals
- Yoo Young-jin – producer, Korean lyrics, composition, arrangement, vocal directing, background vocals, vocoder, talkbox, voice modeling guitar, recording, mixing
- Ryoji Sonada – Japanese lyrics
- Remee – composition
- Lucas Secon – composition
- Thomas Troelsen – composition
- Jeon Hoon – mastering

== Accolades ==
Awards and nominations
Year	Organization	Award	Result	Ref.
2008	Mnet KM Music Festival	Song of the Year	Nominated	
2008	Mnet KM Music Festival	Best Male Group	Nominated	
2008	Mnet KM Music Festival	Best Dance Performance	Nominated	
2009	Melon Music Awards	Star Award	Won	
2009	Seoul Music Awards	Popular Mobile Award	Nominated	
2023	Korea World Music Culture Hall of Fame	Hall of Fame	Inducted	

Music program awards
Program	Date
SBS's Inkigayo	October 12, 2008
SBS's Inkigayo	October 19, 2008
SBS's Inkigayo	October 26, 2008
Mnet's M Countdown	October 16, 2008
Mnet's M Countdown	October 23, 2008
Mnet's M Countdown	October 30, 2008
KBS2's Music Bank	October 31, 2008
KBS2's Music Bank	December 26, 2008

== Charts ==
=== Weekly charts ===
Chart (2008–09)	Peak position
Japan Singles (Oricon)	1
Japan (Japan Hot 100)	7
Japan (RIAJ Digital Track Chart)	91

=== Year-end charts ===
Chart (2008)	Position
Japan Singles (Oricon)	91

== Sales and certifications ==
Region	Certification	Certified units/sales
Japan (RIAJ) Physical single	Gold	100,000^{^}
Japan (RIAJ) Digital single	Gold	100,000^{*}
^{*} Sales figures based on certification alone.^{^} Shipments figures based on certification alone.

== Release history ==
Region	Date	Format	Label	Ref.
South Korea	September 19, 2008	Digital download; streaming	SM Entertainment	
Japan	October 15, 2008	CD single; CD+DVD; digital download	Rhythm Zone	
Taiwan	December 10, 2008	CD single; CD+DVD; digital download	Avex Taiwan	

== See also ==
- List of best-selling singles in South Korea
