= Chocolate (EP) =

- Digital cover

EP by Max Changmin
- Released: April 6, 2020
- Recorded: 2019–2020
- Studios: SM Booming System (Seoul); SM SSAM (Seoul); Sound Pool (Seoul)
- Genres: K-pop; R&B
- Length: 20:18
- Language: Korean
- Labels: SM; Dreamus
- Producers: Lee Soo-man; Thomas Troelsen; Yoo Young-jin; Bottle God (x&); Hitimpulse; Jake Torrey; Omega; Bram Inscore

Max Changmin chronology
Close to You (2015)	Chocolate (2020)	Human (2021)

Singles from Chocolate
- 1. "Chocolate" Released: April 6, 2020

Music video
- "Chocolate" on YouTube

Chocolate is the debut extended play (EP) by South Korean singer Max Changmin. The album was released on April 6, 2020 by SM Entertainment and is distributed by Dreamus. It features six tracks including the title track, "Chocolate" and also includes a collaboration with Korean singer Chungha. The album was produced by Thomas Troelsen, Yoo Young-jin, German-based international production team Hitimpulse, Bottle God (X&), Bram Inscore, Jake Torrey and Omega. Musically, the album incorporates various genres including pop, dance-pop, R&B and folk-rock. Commercially, the EP debuted at number two on the South Korean Gaon Album Chart and at number three on the Japanese Oricon Albums Chart.

== Background and production ==
On March 13, it was reported that the TVXQ member Changmin was preparing to release a solo album. A source from SM Entertainment confirmed the news and released a statement, saying, “Changmin is currently working hard, with the goal of releasing his solo album in April. Please anticipate it.” On March 23, 2020, SM Entertainment announced that Changmin would be making his Korean solo debut with his first mini album titled Chocolate and title track of the same name. The mini album, consisting of six songs of various genres was set to release on April 6.

For the album, Changmin worked with globally renowned music producer Thomas Troelsen, Ian Kirkpatrick, Hitimpulse and Yoo Young-jin, among others. The album also features a collaboration with Korean singer Chungha. Changmin participated in the lyric-writing process of the album. When he was asked where he gets his inspiration from, he said, “Usually when I write songs, I will hear a word in the demo and get inspiration from that to tell a story. That was the case for ‘Chocolate’ as well. For me, the word "chocolate" feels like a word full of desire. It's not always necessary in a dessert, but if it's there, you find yourself getting addicted and eating it. I wanted to compare chocolate to the desire of wanting to meet someone you're attracted to. I also heard an artist saying how they write lyrics with life advice they want to give their son, so I often wrote lyrics with the hopes of conveying a message to my fans that will give them strength.”

== Composition ==
The album incorporates various music genres including pop, R&B and folk-rock. The lead single "Chocolate" is a dance-pop track with lyrics that compare cravings for chocolate to romantic relationships. "High Heels" features "groovy" sounds. "Lie" is a collaboration with singer Chungha and has been described as a pop song featuring simple instrumentals, trendy beats, speedy arrangements and vocal harmonies. The lyrics talk about the emotions exchanged between lovers who feel love in different intensities. "Piano" showcases outstanding development while "Me, Myself & I" is a "hipster" R&B track. "No Tomorrow" is a folk-rock track with lyrics about enjoying the journey of life in difficult times.

== Release and promotion ==
On March 24, 2020, SM Entertainment and TVXQ released a timeline for Changmin's first extended play through their official homepage and SNS accounts, which shows the singer's promotion schedule beginning March 31 until the release of their album on April 6. Album details were revealed on the same day, with the physical album being available in two different versions- Orange and Gold. According to the timetable, five sets of teaser photos were to be revealed over the course of five days from March 31 to April 4, along with a mood sampler on each day. On April 4, the first teaser for the music video was unveiled. On April 5, the tracklist was released, side by side with the second and final teaser for the music video.

The album and an accompanying music video for the lead single "Chocolate" were released on April 6. The same day, Changmin held a live broadcast on Naver V LIVE broadcasting site to discuss the new album. A performance video for "Chocolate" was released on April 13. Changmin promoted the lead single "Chocolate" on South Korean music shows including KBS Music Bank, MBC Show! Music Core and SBS Inkigayo.

A special music video for the track "Me, Myself & I" was also released on April 15.

== Reception ==
Upon its release, Chocolate debuted number two on the Gaon Album Chart. The album also charted at number three on the Oricon Albums Chart.

== Track listing ==
Chocolate track listing
No.	Title	Lyrics	Music	Arrangement	Length
1.	"Chocolate"	Changmin	Thomas Troelsen; Sam Martin; Ian Kirkpatrick	Thomas Troelsen; Yoo Young-jin	2:52
2.	"High Heels"	Bottle God (X &)	Bottle God (x&); Aisle (이아일)	Bottle God (x&)	3:40
3.	"Lie" (featuring Chungha)	Seo Ji-eum	Jake Torrey; Alma Goodman; Hitimpulse	Hitimpulse	3:26
4.	"Piano"	Hwang Yubin	Thomas Troelsen	Thomas Troelsen	3:11
5.	"Me, Myself & I"	Bottle God (X&)	Bottle God (X&)	Bottle God (X&)	3:44
6.	"No Tomorrow"	Changmin	Jake Torrey; Omega; Bram Inscore; Isabella "Machine" Summers	Jake Torrey; Omega; Bram Inscore	3:25
Total length:					20:18

== Charts ==
Chart performance for Chocolate
Chart (2020)	Peak position
Japanese Albums (Oricon)	3
South Korean Albums (Gaon)	2

Chart performance for singles from Chocolate
Song	Chart (2020)	Peak position
"Chocolate"	South Korea (Gaon)	100

== Release history ==
Release history and formats for Chocolate
Region	Date	Format	Label	Ref.
South Korea	April 6, 2020	CD; digital download; streaming	SM; Dreamus	
Various	April 6, 2020	Digital download; streaming	SM; Dreamus	
