= Toki o Tomete =

Single by Tohoshinki

from the album Best Selection 2010
- B-side: "Checkmate"
- Released: March 24, 2010
- Recorded: 2010
- Genre: J-pop
- Length: 5:34
- Label: SM Entertainment Japan/Rhythm Zone
- Songwriters: Shinjiroh Inoue; Ichiro Fujiya
- Producer: Daisuke Kahara

Tohoshinki singles chronology
"Break Out!" (2010)	"Toki o Tomete" (2010)	"Athena" (2010)

"Toki o Tomete" (時ヲ止メテ, Stopping Time) is the 30th Japanese single by South Korean boy band Tohoshinki, released on March 24, 2010. The single was released as a re-cut from their greatest hits album Best Selection 2010, which was released one month earlier. "Toki o Tomete" was the last single to feature former band members Jaejoong, Yoochun, and Junsu.

The song was Tohoshinki's second song to be used in commercials for Menard Cosmetics. Tohoshinki's "Wasurenaide" was previously used in 2009.

== Track listing ==
=== CD+DVD version ===
No.	Title	Writer(s)	Arranger	Length
1.	"Toki o Tomete"	Shinjiroh Inoue, Ichiro Fujiya	Daisuke Kahara	5:34
2.	"Checkmate" (Yunho solo)	H.U.B., Yunho, Lee Chan Woo	Yunho, Lee	4:28
3.	"Toki o Tomete" (less vocal)	Inoue, Fujiya	Kahara	5:33
4.	"Checkmate" (less vocal)	H.U.B., Yunho, Lee	Yunho, Lee	4:26
Total length:				20:02

DVD track list
No.	Title	Length
1.	"Toki o Tomete" (video clip)	5:45

=== CD only version ===
No.	Title	Writer(s)	Arranger	Length
1.	"Toki o Tomete"	Inoue, Fujiya	Kahara	5:34
2.	"Checkmate" (Yunho solo)	H.U.B., Yunho, Lee	Yunho, Lee	4:28
3.	"Toki o Tomete" (Never End remix)	Inoue, Fujiya	Inoue	6:04
4.	"Toki o Tomete" (less vocal)	Inoue, Fujiya	Kahara	5:33
5.	"Checkmate" (less vocal)	H.U.B., Yunho, Lee	Yunho, Lee	4:26
Total length:				26:05

== Chart rankings ==
=== Oricon Charts (Japan) ===
Release	Chart	Peak position	First week sales	Sales total
March 24, 2010	Oricon Daily Singles Chart	1		
March 24, 2010	Oricon Weekly Singles Chart	1	195,000	228,000
March 24, 2010	Oricon Yearly Singles Chart	26		228,448

=== Various charts ===
Chart	Peak position
Billboard Japan Hot 100	1
Billboard Adult Contemporary Airplay	38
RIAJ Digital Track Chart Top 100	26
