= Stand by U =

2009 single by TVXQ

Single by Tohoshinki

from the album Best Selection 2010
- B-side: "Tea for Two"; "Sky"; "Stand by U" (Luv Behind the Mld Mix)
- Released: July 1, 2009
- Recorded: Avex Studio Azabu, Sony Music Studio, Prime Sound Studio Aoyama
- Genre: Pop, R&B
- Label: Rhythm Zone
- Songwriters: Shinjiroh Inoue, H.u.b.

Tohoshinki singles chronology
"Share the World/We Are!" (2009)	"Stand by U" (2009)	"Break Out!" (2010)

Music video
- "Stand by U" on YouTube

"Stand by U" is South Korean pop group Tohoshinki's twenty-eighth Japanese language single. "Stand by U" was released on July 1, 2009 by their label Rhythm Zone and was released in two formats: CD and CD+DVD. The track serves as the final single promoted by the group as a five-piece, following which legal troubles caused the group to go on an extended hiatus.

== Background ==
Shortly after the release of their twenty-seventh Japanese language single, "Share the World/We Are!", news about the group recording the single started to surfaced online.

== Chart performance ==
Upon the release of the single in Japan, it took the number two spot on the Oricon daily chart selling over 94,800 copies. On July 5, 2009 daily chart the single peaked at the number-one spot selling nearly 29,300 copies. On the issue date of July 13, 2009, "Stand by U" debuted at number two on the Oricon weekly chart behind pop boy band Arashi's "Everything"; selling a little more than 182,060 copies.

== Music video ==
Like their twenty-third Japanese single, "Dōshite Kimi o Suki ni Natte Shimattandarō?", two music videos were shot for "Stand by U": drama version and version with Tohoshinki's members. Both videos were shot by Hideaki Sunaga (須永秀明, Sunaga Hideaki) and the video features the members in a hotel. As the song was used as the theme song for Japanese mobile drama Sweet Room, the music video features the characters of the first story Last Love starring Narimiya Hiroki as the male lead and Yukari Shiomi as the female lead.

== Live performance ==
On June 20, 2009, Tohoshinki appeared on Music Fair and performed "Stand by U" as well as "Sky". They also appeared on other shows such as NHK Save the Future 2009, Music Station and Music Japan, performing "Stand by U".

== Track listing ==
No.	Title	Lyrics	Music	Length
1.	"Stand by U"	Shinjiroh Inoue	Uta, Reo	5:56
2.	"Tea for Two"	H.u.b.	Ichiro Fujiya	4:41
3.	"Sky (Bonus Track)"	H.u.b.	H-wonder	5:31
4.	"Stand by U: Luv Behind the Mld Mix" (CD only)			6:12
5.	"Stand by U (Less Vocal)"			5:56
6.	"Tea for Two (Less Vocal)"			4:39

DVD
No.	Title	Length
1.	"Stand by U (Video Clip)"
2.	"Off Shot Movie"

== Credits ==
- Vocals: Tohoshinki
- Recording: Hideaki Jinbu ("Stand by U", "Tea for Two" and "Sky"), Masahiro Kawata ("Stand by U")
  - Location: Avex Studio Azabu, Sony Music Studio ("Stand by U", "Tea for Two" and "Stand by U: Luv Behind the Mld Mix"), Prime Sound Studio Aoyama ("Sky")
- Mix engineers: Naoki Yamada ("Stand by U", "Tea for Two" and "Sky"), Masahiro Kawata ("Stand by U: Luv Behind the Mld Mix")
- Music: Uta and Reo ("Stand by U), Ichiro Fujiya ("Tea for Two"), H-wonder ("Sky")
- Music director: Katsutoshi Yasuhara

== Charts, peaks and certifications ==
=== Charts ===
Chart (2009)	Peak position
Japan Oricon Daily Singles Chart	1
Japan Oricon Weekly Singles Chart	2
Taiwan G-Music J-Pop Chart	1

=== Sales and certifications ===
Country	Provider	Sales	Certification
Japan	RIAJ	182,060+	Gold

== Release history ==
Country	Date	Label
Japan	July 1, 2009	Rhythm Zone
South Korea	July 20, 2009	SM Entertainment
Taiwan	July 10, 2009	Avex Taiwan
