= Mirotic (album) =

Album by TVXQ

- Digital and A version cover

Studio album by TVXQ
- Released: September 26, 2008
- Recorded: 2007–2008
- Studios: Avex Azabu (Tokyo); Bunkamura (Tokyo); SM Blue Ocean (Seoul); SM Booming System (Seoul); SM Concert Hall (Seoul); SM Yellow Tail (Seoul); T (Seoul)
- Genres: K-pop; dance; electropop
- Length: 50:27
- Language: Korean
- Label: SM
- Producer: Lee Soo-man

TVXQ chronology
T (2008)	Mirotic (2008)	The Secret Code (2009)

Singles from Mirotic
- 1. "Mirotic" Released: September 26, 2008; 2. "Wrong Number" Released: November 1, 2008

Mirotic is the fourth Korean studio album (seventh overall) by South Korean pop group TVXQ, released on September 26, 2008, by SM Entertainment. This is the group's last Korean album to feature members Jaejoong, Yoochun and Junsu.

The album was a major commercial breakthrough and is TVXQ's most critically successful album to date. The best-selling album of 2008, Mirotic debuted atop the Hanteo charts and sold 110,000 albums in one week, setting the record for one-week sales in South Korea on that chart. Version A of the album sold over 208,000 copies in a month, and cumulative sales surpassed 500,000 copies 109 days after its release. Mirotic was the first Korean album in four years, since Seo Taiji's 2004 album 7th Issue, to break 500,000 sales. Mirotic sold over 594,000 copies in South Korea by 2022.

== Background ==
The album had been in production since 2007, but the title was not decided upon until January 2008. TVXQ members Xiah Junsu and Max Changmin participated directly in the making of the album, penning the lyrics for "노을.. 바라보다 (Picture of You)" and "Love in the Ice", respectively. In addition, members Hero Jaejoong and Micky Yoochun composed and wrote the lyrics to "사랑아 울지마 (Don't Cry My Lover)" and "사랑 안녕 사랑 (Love Bye Love)", respectively, for version C of the album.

TVXQ had two promotional singles from the album. The title single "Mirotic" won a total of nine number-one trophies on Korean music programs The Music Trend, Music Bank, and M! Countdown, and is touted by critics as a staple song of K-pop. Though succeeding single "Wrong Number" was unable to meet the success of its predecessor, it was an acclaimed K-pop hit.

Mirotic won the Disk Daesang (equivalent to Album of the Year) at the 23rd Golden Disk Awards and Album of the Year at the 2008 Mnet KM Music Festival (MKMF). It is currently the best-selling album among Korea's second-generation idols, earning the name "Album of the Decade."

The choreography of "주문-Mirotic," the title track of the album, was done in a collaboration between Korean choreographers and Kenny Wormald, who had also worked with pop stars Justin Timberlake, Chris Brown and Christina Aguilera. The song features a "reverse beat" track, meaning that the bass beat is either a half beat or a whole beat late in coming into a new phrase. While in most genres of music, the bass note comes in directly on the first beat of the measure in setting the chord of the phrase, reverse beat songs alter this usual method. In doing so, the reverse beat genre is said to have an effect of "growing on" the listener, having an addictive sound.

"Mirotic" is a newly coined term, created by member Hero Jaejoong, that combines the Korean miro (미로), meaning "maze", and the English suffix "-tic". The title song was composed by the Danish producers, Remee, Lucas Secon and Thomas Troelsen. The German singer, Sarah Connor, also bought the copyright to the song (not specified when). Despite the fact that the two original songs were the same composed piece, they have musical differences (TVXQ's version has a rap and multi-layered harmonies while Connor's has a bridge; the melodies in the chorus also differ). "Mirotic" is one of the most successful singles ever in South Korea, in 2008 the song was downloaded 2,337,864 times. By the end of 2011 the song was officially downloaded 4,173,225 times.

== Reception ==
Professional ratings
Review scores
Source	Rating
IZM	3.5/5 stars

Mirotic received positive reviews from music critics. Hwang Seon-eop, an editor of South Korean magazine IZM, rated the album 3.5 out of 5 stars, praising the record's production and the group members' performance.

=== Accolades ===
Ceremony	Year	Award	Result	Ref.
France J-Music Awards	2008	Best Asian Album of the Year	Won	
Golden Disc Awards	2008	Album Daesang (Grand Prize)	Won	
Golden Disc Awards	2008	Album Bonsang (Main Prize)	Won	
Golden Disc Awards	2008	Yepp Popularity Award	Won	
Mnet KM Music Festival	2008	Album of the Year	Won	

== Lyrics controversy ==
In November 2008, the Korean Commission of Youth Protection ruled that the lyrics of "Mirotic" were provocative and overly sexual. As a result, the album was labeled with stickers indicating that it was unsuitable for people under 19 years old and any performances of the song would have to be broadcast after 10pm. In response to the ruling, SM Entertainment agreed to make a clean version but also had filed an injunction to overrule the commission's decision, asserting that the lyrics are "entirely different and miles away from the erotic or sexual that the association is making it to be."

TVXQ performed the clean version at the 23rd Annual Golden Disk Awards. The lyrics were changed from "I got you" to "I chose you" and "I got you under my skin" to "I got you under my sky." In March 2009, the Seoul Administrative Court ruled in favor of SM Entertainment, stating that the concerned lyrics "neither encouraged youth to have sex or described women as object for sex". The following month, the Commission of Youth Protection announced they would appeal the ruling to a high court after having an emergency meeting and deeming that the phrase, "I got you under my skin", was inappropriate for minors.

== Track listing ==
Mirotic Version A & B track list
No.	Title	Lyrics	Music	Arrangement	Length
1.	"Mirotic" (주문; Jumun; 'Magic Spell')	Yoo Young-jin	Mikkel Sigvardt; Lucas Secon; Thomas Troelsen; Yoo Young-jin	Yoo Young-jin	3:28
2.	"Wrong Number"	Kang Joon-woo	Marvin Ambrosius; Christopher Lee-Joe (BNA Productions); Philippe-Marc Anquetil (BNA Productions); Iain James	Yoo Han-jin	4:14
3.	"Picture of You" (노을... 바라보다; Noeul... baraboda; 'Looking at the Sunset')	Xiah Junsu	Marcus Jilla; James Hollands; James Critcher	Marcus Jilla; James Hollands; James Critcher	4:51
4.	"Crazy Love"	Young-hu Kim	Young-hu Kim	Young-hu Kim	3:43
5.	"Hey!" (Don't Bring Me Down)	Yoo Young-jin	Yoo Young-jin	Yoo Young-jin	4:11
6.	"You're My Melody" (넌 나의 노래; Neon naui norae)	Young-hu Kim	Sean Alexander; Pascal Guyon; Jimmy Andrew Richard	Sean Alexander; Pascal Guyon; Jimmy Andrew Richard	3:33
7.	"Rainbow" (무지개; Mujigae)	Kim Jeong-bae	Kenzie	Kenzie	4:11
8.	"Paradise" (낙원; Nagwon)	Wheesung	Kelvin Kumar (KSK); Sean Kumar (KSK)	KSK	4:39
9.	"Are You a Good Girl?" (악녀; Angnyeo; 'Wicked Woman')	Yoo Young-jin	Yoo Young-jin	Yoo Young-jin	4:11
10.	"Flower Lady" (Cover of Andrew Grange's "Stay With Me (Always)")	Jo Yoon-kyung	Andrew Grange; Rupert Gayle; Micah Williams; Tesung Kim (Iconic Sounds)	Yoo Han-jin	3:53
11.	"Forgotten Season" (잊혀진 계절; Icheojin gyejeol) (solo performed by Hero Jaejoong)	Park Keon-ho	Lee Beom-hee	Hong-seok	4:22
12.	"Love in the Ice" (Korean version)	Ryoji Sonoda; Max Changmin	Daisuke Suzuki	Daisuke Suzuki; Yuya Saito	5:18
Total length:					48:44

Notes

- Track 5 is stylized in all caps as HEY!
- Version B of the album does not include Tracks 11 & 12 ("Forgotten Season" & "Love in the Ice (Korean version)").

Mirotic Version C track list
No.	Title	Lyrics	Music	Arrangement	Length
1.	"Wrong Number"	Kang Joon-woo	Marvin Ambrosius; Christopher Lee-Joe (BNA Productions); Philippe-Marc Anquetil (BNA Productions); Iain James	Yoo Han-jin	4:14
2.	"Don't Cry My Lover" (사랑아 울지마; Saranga uljima)	Hero Jaejoong	Hero Jaejoong	Jo Joon-young (Crazy Musician)	4:44
3.	"Mirotic" (주문)	Yoo Young-jin	Mikkel Sigvardt; Lucas Secon; Thomas Troelsen	Yoo Young-jin	3:28
4.	"Crazy Love"	Young-hu Kim	Young-hu Kim	Young-hu Kim	3:43
5.	"Hey!" (Don't Bring Me Down)	Yoo Young-jin	Yoo Young-jin	Yoo Young-jin	4:11
6.	"Wish" (소원; Sowon) (featuring Ryeowook and Kyuhyun of Super Junior)	Park Joon-ha	Park Joon-ha	Hong Seok	4:36
7.	"You're My Melody" (넌 나의 노래)	Young-hu Kim	Sean Alexander; Pascal Guyon; Jimmy Andrew Richard	Sean Alexander; Pascal Guyon; Jimmy Andrew Richard	3:33
8.	"Picture of You" (노을... 바라보다)	Xiah Junsu	Marcus Jilla; James Hollands; James Critcher	Marcus Jilla; James Hollands; James Critcher	4:51
9.	"Rainbow" (무지개)	Kim Jeong-bae	Kenzie	Kenzie	4:11
10.	"Love Bye Love" (사랑 안녕 사랑; Sarang annyeong sarang)	Micky Yoochun	Micky Yoo-chun	Micky Yoo-chun	3:34
11.	"Paradise" (낙원)	Wheesung	Kelvin Kumar (KSK); Sean Kumar (KSK)	KSK	4:39
12.	"Are You a Good Girl?" (악녀)	Yoo Young-jin	Yoo Young-jin	Yoo Young-jin	4:11
13.	"Flower Lady" (Cover of Andrew Grange's "Stay With Me (Always)")	Jo Yoon-kyung	Andrew Grange; Rupert Gayle; Micah Williams; Tesung Kim (Iconic Sounds)	Yoo Han-jin	3:53
14.	"Don't Say Goodbye"	Kim Ji-hoo; Tesung Kim (Iconic Sounds)	Kim Ji-hoo; Tesung Kim (Iconic Sounds)	Kim Ji-hoo; Tesung Kim (Iconic Sounds)	4:25
15.	"Forgotten Season" (잊혀진 계절) (solo performed by Hero Jaejoong)	Park Keon-ho	Lee Beom-hee	Hong-seok	4:22
16.	"Love in the Ice" (Korean version)	Ryoji Sonoda; Max Changmin	Daisuke Suzuki	Daisuke Suzuki; Yuya Saito	5:18
Total length:					77:38

Mirotic Version B – DVD
No.	Title	Length
1.	"Directed by Hero (Interviewee: U-Know)"
2.	"Directed by U-Know (Interviewee: Max)"
3.	"Directed by Max (Interviewee: Xiah)"
4.	"Directed by Xiah (Interviewee: Micky)"
5.	"Directed by Micky (Interviewee: Hero)"
6.	"Directed by TVXQ! - Talk about Mirotic"
7.	"Directed by TVXQ! - 'Surprise Project [a-nation'08 Diary]'"

Mirotic Version C – DVD
No.	Title	Length
1.	"Mirotic" (music video)
2.	"Making of "Mirotic" music video"
3.	"Directed by Hero (Interviewee: U-Know)"
4.	"Directed by U-Know (Interviewee: Max)"
5.	"Directed by Max (Interviewee: Xiah)"
6.	"Directed by Xiah (Interviewee: Micky)"
7.	"Directed by Micky (Interviewee: Hero)"
8.	"Directed by TVXQ! - Talk about Mirotic"
9.	"Directed by TVXQ! - 'Surprise Project [a-nation'08 Diary]'"

== Charts ==
=== Weekly charts ===
Chart (2008)	Peak position
Taiwanese Albums (G-Music)	3

Chart (2010)	Peak position
South Korean Albums (Gaon)	10

=== Monthly charts ===
Chart (2008)	Peak position
South Korean Albums (RIAK)	1

== Sales ==
Region	Certification	Certified units/sales
South Korea	—	594,649

== Release history ==
Country	Date	Version	Format(s)	Label
South Korea	September 26, 2008	Version A	CD; digital download	SM Entertainment
South Korea	September 26, 2008	Version B	CD; DVD; digital download	SM Entertainment
South Korea	November 12, 2008	Version C (special edition)	CD; DVD; digital download	SM Entertainment
Taiwan	October 17, 2008	Taiwanese edition	CD	Avex Taiwan
Japan	December 12, 2008	Japanese edition	CD + DVD	Avex; Rhythm Zone
