= Survivor (TVXQ song) =

Single by Tohoshinki

from the album The Secret Code
- B-side: "Take Your Hand"
- Released: March 11, 2009
- Recorded: 2009
- Genre: Pop
- Label: SM Entertainment/Rhythm Zone
- Songwriters: Hub; Iain James, Robert Habolin, and Adam Powers
- Producer: Robert Habolin

Tohoshinki singles chronology
"Bolero/Kiss the Baby Sky/Wasurenaide" (2009)	"Survivor" (2009)	"Share the World/We Are!" (2009)

Music video
- "Survivor" on YouTube

"Survivor" is Tohoshinki's twenty-sixth Japanese single. The single was released on 11 March 2009 and peaked at number three on the Oricon Singles Chart. It is composed by Iain James, Robert Habolin, and Adam Powers and produced by Habolin.

== Track list ==
No.	Title	Lyrics	Music	Length
1.	"Survivor"	H.u.b	Iain James, Robert Habolin, Adam Powers	3:16
2.	"Take Your Hand"	Sonoda Ryoji	Steve Smith, Anthony Anderson, Jenson David Aubrey Vaughan, Creig Smart	3:22
3.	"Survivor: Seven Seas Premium" (CD-only version)	H.u.b	Iain James, Robert Habolin, Adam Powers	3:37
4.	"Survivor (Instrumental)"		Iain James, Robert Habolin, Adam Powers	3:15
5.	"Take Your Hand (Instrumental)"		Steve Smith, Anthony Anderson, Jenson David Aubrey Vaughan, Creig Smart	3:20

== Live performances ==
- March 6, 2009 - Music Station
- March 13, 2009 - Music Japan
- March 14, 2009 - Music Fighter
- April 25, 2009 - Music fair 21

== Chart ==
Chart	Peak position	Sales total
Oricon Daily Singles Chart	3	54,243
Oricon Weekly Singles Chart	3	74,716
Oricon Monthly Singles Chart	9	79,679
Oricon Yearly Singles Chart	65	
