= Beautiful You / Sennen Koi Uta =

- Beautiful You / 千年恋うた CD cover

Single by Tohoshinki

from the album The Secret Code
- Released: April 23, 2008
- Recorded: 2008
- Genre: J-Pop, R&B, Soul
- Length: 4:38
- Label: SM Entertainment Japan/Avex Trax/Rhythm Zone
- Songwriters: Lyrics: Composition: Arrangement:

Tohoshinki singles chronology
| "Keyword / Maze" (2008) | "Beautiful You / Sennen Koi Uta" (2008) | "Dōshite Kimi o Suki ni Natte Shimattandarō?" (2008) |

Music video
- "Beautiful You" on YouTube

"Beautiful You / Sennen Koi Uta" (千年恋歌, lit. One Thousand Year Love Song) is Tohoshinki's 22nd Japanese single, released on April 23, 2008, shortly before the completion of the T album Japan tour. "Sennen Koi Uta" was used as the opening theme for "The Legend (太王四神記)", a Korean drama that was later aired in Japan. Oricon News predicted that the consecutive releases of the previous single albums as well as the popularity of the historical drama series were expected to boost the sales of the latest single.

It is Tohoshinki's second #1 single on the Weekly Oricon Charts. Similar to their "Purple Line" single, they wrote history again in the Japanese music industry by becoming the second foreign artist, next to Ou Yang Fei Fei, to have 2 chart-toppers. According to the Oricon, TVXQ succeeded Ou Yang Fei Fei's position after 24 years and 5 months.

== Track listing ==
| No. | Title | Lyrics | Music | Length |
|---|---|---|---|---|
| 1. | "Beautiful You" | H.u.b | Joleen Belle, Steve Smith, Anthony Anderson | 4:37 |
| 2. | "Sennen Koi Uta" (千年恋歌 One Thousand Year Love Song) | H.u.b, Lim Bo Kyung | Joe Hisaishi | 4:01 |
| 3. | "CLAP! -SOUL of SOUL remix-" (CD only) | H.u.b | Figge Boström | 3:10 |
| 4. | "Beautiful You (Less Vocal)" | | | 4:37 |
| 5. | "Sennen Koi Uta (Less Vocal)" | | | 4:01 |

DVD
| No. | Title | Length |
|---|---|---|
| 1. | "Beautiful You" |
| 2. | "Off Shot Movie" (First press only) |

== Release history ==
| Country | Date |
|---|---|
| Japan | April 23, 2008 |
| South Korea | April 23, 2008 |

== Music video ==
=== "Beautiful You" ===
In the music video for "Beautiful You" it shows all the members in a house in other rooms like the bathroom or sitting near the stairs. There is other scenes of them dancing.

=== "Sennen Koi Uta" ===
This music video features a lot of scenes from the movie called The Legend.

== Chart positions ==
Oricon sales charts (Japan)

| Release | Chart | Peak position | Sales total |
|---|---|---|---|
| April 23, 2008 | Oricon Daily Singles Chart | 1 | |
| April 23, 2008 | Oricon Weekly Singles Chart | 1 | 62,139 |
| April 23, 2008 | Oricon Monthly Singles Chart | 6 | 77,883 |
| April 23, 2008 | Oricon Yearly Singles Chart | 73 | 119,213 |
