= Max Changmin =

South Korean singer and actor

Shim Changmin
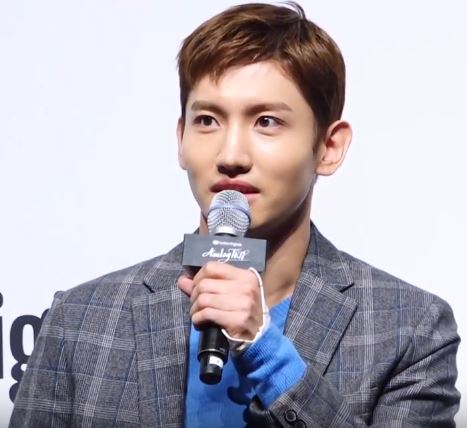
- Changmin in 2019
- Born: Shim Chang-min; February 18, 1988 (age 38); Seoul, South Korea
- Other name: Max
- Education: Kyung Hee University; Konkuk University; Inha University
- Occupations: Singer-songwriter; actor; lyricist
- Years active: 2003–present
- Spouse: Unnamed (m. 2020)
- Children: 1
- Musical career
- Genres: K-pop; dance; R&B; electronic; rock
- Instrument: Vocals
- Labels: SM; Avex Trax; Rhythm Zone
- Member of: TVXQ; SM Town; SM the Ballad
- Website: max.smtown.com

Korean name
- Hangul: 심창민
- RR: Sim Changmin
- MR: Sim Ch'angmin

Stage name
- Hangul: 최강창민
- RR: Choegang Changmin
- MR: Ch'oegang Ch'angmin

Signature
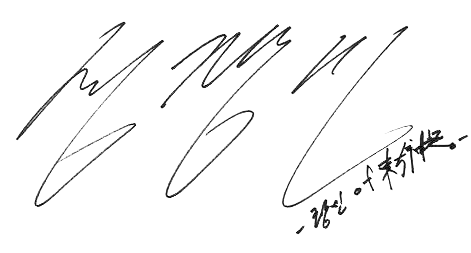

Shim Chang-min (Korean: 심창민; born February 18, 1988), better known by his stage name Max Changmin (최강창민; Choegang Changmin), is a South Korean singer-songwriter, actor, and a member of the pop duo TVXQ. Born and raised in Seoul, South Korea, Changmin was scouted by an SM Entertainment talent agent when he was fourteen years old. He made his debut as TVXQ's youngest member in December 2003.

Fluent in both Korean and Japanese, Changmin has achieved commercial success throughout Asia as the main vocalist of TVXQ. He has also starred in several dramas.

== Early life ==
Changmin was born and raised in Songpa District, Seoul, South Korea to a Buddhist family. He has two younger sisters and both of his parents are teachers. When he was fourteen years old, a talent scout from S.M. Entertainment spotted Changmin while he was singing and playing badminton at the same time during gym class. The scout suggested that he audition for S.M., but Changmin had no interest in becoming a singer. His mother, wanting a chance to meet BoA, urged Changmin to attend the casting auditions anyway. Three days after auditioning, S.M. called Changmin in for a second audition, which he passed. After winning the Best Singer and Best Artist award at S.M.'s 6th Annual Youth Best Contest, Changmin signed with the company.

== Music career ==
=== TVXQ ===
The final lineup of TVXQ consisted of Changmin, U-Know Yunho, Kim Jae-joong, Park Yoo-chun, and Kim Jun-su. The group officially debuted on December 26, 2003, during a BoA and Britney Spears showcase. They performed their debut single "Hug", which became a hit in South Korea. TVXQ has been releasing number one albums in Korea since their second studio album Rising Sun (2005), which was also the album that gave the group their first Daesang (대상), or Grand Award, at the Mnet KM Music Festival. Their fourth Korean album Mirotic (2008) was the Album of the Year at the 2008 Mnet KM Music Festival and the 2008 Golden Disc Awards. The album features the group's most well-known and bestselling single, "Mirotic."

In 2005, TVXQ made their Japanese debut with the single "Stay with Me Tonight," debuting at number 37 on the Oricon Singles Chart. They grabbed their first number one single in Japan with "Purple Line" (2008). Their fourth Japanese album The Secret Code spawned two platinum-selling singles "Dōshite Kimi o Suki ni Natte Shimattandarō?" and Share the World" (2009), a theme song for the anime One Piece.

TVXQ was plunged into legal turmoil when members Jaejoong, Yoochun, and Junsu filed an injunction against their agency in July 2009. This led to their much-publicized departure from the group in 2010. A year later, Changmin and Yunho returned as a duo, releasing albums in both Korean and Japanese. As a duo, TVXQ set sales records and concert attendance records in Japan, becoming the country's bestselling and highest-grossing foreign music act.

=== S.M. The Ballad and solo career ===
In 2014, Changmin joined the ballad group S.M. the Ballad, initially formed by S.M. Entertainment in 2010. On the group's 2nd album Breath, he sang the Japanese version of the title track "Breath" with f(x)'s Krystal Jung.

=== 2015–present: Close to You, Chocolate, Human, and Devil ===
Changmin released his first Japanese solo mini album Close to You on November 18, 2015, one day before his enlistment. The lead single is a ballad titled "Into the Water", among six other tracks. Bundled with a DVD that includes a music video and behind-the-scenes footage, Close to You was a limited release and was only made available for purchase to members of TVXQ's Japanese fanclub, Bigeast.

On March 13, 2020, it was reported that the TVXQ member was preparing to release a solo album. A source from SM Entertainment confirmed the news and stated, "Changmin is currently working hard, with the goal of releasing his solo album in April."

On March 23, 2020, SM Entertainment announced that Changmin would be releasing his debut mini album Chocolate on April 6. The mini-album consists of six songs of varying genres—including the title track "Chocolate" and features a collaboration with Korean singer Chungha.

Although Changmin had previously released solo songs in the past, through TVXQ's albums, contributions to soundtracks and as well as a Japanese solo mini-album, Chocolate marked Changmin's official solo debut in Korea after debuting in the band more than 16 years ago. Fellow member Yunho also released his first solo mini-album True Colors the previous year.

On December 8, 2021, Changmin released his second Japanese mini album Human.

On January 13, 2022, Changmin released his second mini album Devil.

== Television and acting career ==
Changmin made his acting debut alongside TVXQ in the miniseries Vacation, which had a special premiere and screening at the main auditorium of Yonsei University. He also participated in a number of episodes of Banjun Drama, a popular mini series that aired on SBS network.

In 2010, Changmin had a guest role in the action thriller series Athena: Goddess of War, playing a NIS explosives specialist.

In 2011, Changmin took on his first lead role in the romantic comedy drama Paradise Ranch opposite Lee Yeon-hee. He also dubbed his own voice for the Japanese release of Paradise Ranch.

In 2012, Changmin made his big-screen debut in the Japanese film Fly With the Gold based on the novel by Takamura Kaoru. He plays Momo, a North Korean spy disguised as an engineering student. He has been praised for his fluent Osaka dialect in the film by director Izutsu Kazuyuki. Changmin was nominated for the Newcomer Award at the prestigious 37th annual Hochi Film Awards in Japan, becoming the first Korean artist to be nominated. On January 21, 2013, it was announced that Changmin had won the Newcomer of the Year award at the 36th Japanese Academy Award.

In 2013, Changmin became a co-host alongside Kang Ho-dong for the KBS variety show Moonlight Prince. This was Changmin's first stint as a regular host. Following the end of the show in March, Changmin joined the cast of sports variety show Cool Kiz On The Block as a cast member and left in 2014.

In 2014, Changmin starred in Mnet's four-episode miniseries Mimi. He next starred in the historical fantasy drama The Scholar Who Walks The Night as Crown Prince Lee Yoon.

== Artistry ==
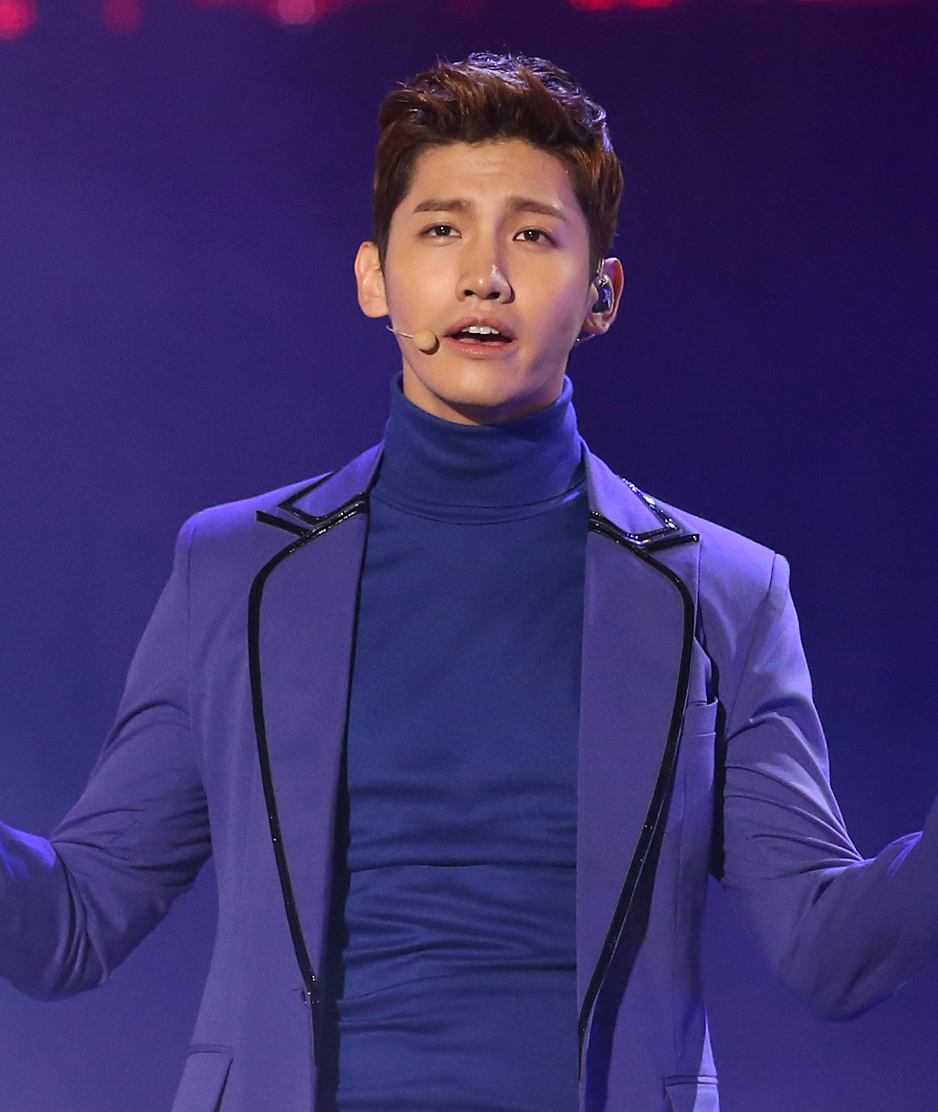
Changmin at the 2012 K-pop World Festival

Changmin is known for his high tenor register, particularly his screams and high notes. He is also active as a lyricist, and has written for several of the band's music, including 2007's "Evergreen" (Only Love), the Korean version of "Love in the Ice" (Mirotic), "Confession" (Keep Your Head Down), and "I Swear" (Catch Me).

Changmin has also written for other groups and artists; such as "Sleepless Night", a track in SHINee's third album Chapter 2. Why So Serious? – The Misconceptions of Me; and "Ace", the title track of Taemin's album Ace; as well as "My Thoughts, Your Memories", a track on Kyuhyun's album At Gwanghwamun.

== Personal life ==
Besides his native Korean, Changmin is fluent in Japanese. Changmin graduated from Gaepo High School in 2006 and was accepted into Kyung Hee University in 2009, majoring in postmodern music. In 2011, he pursued a second degree in Film and Arts at Konkuk University. He went on to pursue a master's degree at Inha University. He is also interested in becoming a professional photographer and is a student of photographer Kim Young-joon.

=== Relationship and marriage ===
The singer originally had planned to marry his non-celebrity girlfriend on September 5, 2020, but the wedding was later postponed due to concerns over the COVID-19 pandemic. The couple subsequently married in a private ceremony on October 25, 2020. His wife gave birth to their first son on October 17, 2022.

=== Volunteer work ===
In January 2008, Changmin volunteered with his father in the cleanup of the beaches in Taean, South Korea following the nation's worst oil spill in history. His trip to Taean was intended to be done secretly during a short break from his activities with TVXQ during the new year and was only made known to the media and public when another volunteer posted his sighting on a fan site. The incident was later confirmed by TVXQ's agent.

=== Military service ===
On July 7, 2015, Changmin applied for the Military Police to fulfill his compulsory national service. He was inducted into the Republic of Korea Armed Forces as a conscripted policeman on November 19, 2015. Changmin received five weeks of basic training at the Chungnam Nonsan Military Training Camp and was the leader of his squad. He was honorably discharged from service on August 18, 2017.

== Discography ==
=== Extended plays ===
Title	Details	Peak chart positions		Sales
Title	Details	KOR	JPN	Sales
Korean
Chocolate	Released: April 6, 2020; Label: SM Entertainment; Formats: CD, digital download, streaming	2	3	KOR: 109,711; JPN: 18,171
Devil	Released: January 13, 2022; Label: SM Entertainment; Formats: CD, digital download, streaming	7	17	KOR: 34,910; JPN: 2,643
All of My Life	Released: October 19, 2026; Label: SM Entertainment; Formats: CD, digital download, streaming	—	25	JPN: 2,332
Japanese
Close to You	Released: November 18, 2015 (limited); Label: Avex Trax; Formats: CD+DVD; Track listing CD: 1. "Into the Water"; 2. "Michinori" (道程) (The Journey); 3. "Oh No!"; 4. "Rock with U"; 5. "Gold Dust"; 6. "Admit It, You Love It"; 7. "Kogarashi ga Todoku Koro ni" (木枯らしが届く頃に) (When the Cold Winter Wind Comes); DVD: 1. "Into the Water" (Video clip); 2. Jacket Making Movie; 3. Off Shot Movie	—	—	—N/a
Human	Released: December 8, 2021; Label: Avex Trax; Formats: CD+DVD; Track listing CD: 1. "Don't Let Me Down"; 2. "Human"; 3. "You Light My Moon"; 4. "Mo Aisiteruto Ienai" (もう愛してると言えない) (I Can't Say I Love You Anymore); 5. "Put Your Records On"; 6. "Over"; DVD: 1. "Human" (Video clip); 2. Jacket Making Movie; 3. Video Clip Off Shot Movie	—	2	JPN: 28,480
"—" denotes releases that did not chart or were not released in that region.

=== Singles ===
Song	Year	Originating album	Notes
"Wild Soul"	2008	Two Hearts/Wild Soul	
"Big Time"	2010	—N/a	Performed at SM Town Live '10 World Tour
"고백 (Confession)"	2011	Keep Your Head Down	
"눈물 같은 사람 (A Person Like Tears)"	2012	Jeon Woo-chi Original Soundtrack	
"Rock With U"	2013	Close To You	Performed at Time: Live Tour 2013
"Gold Dust"	2013	Close To You	Performed at The Mission II tour
"Breath" (Japanese version)	2014	SM the Ballad Vol. 2 – Breath	duet with Krystal of f(x)
"Heaven's Day"	2014	Spellbound	
"슬픔 속에 그댈 지워야만 해 (Because I Love You) – Acoustic version"	2014	Mimi Original Soundtrack	
"Over"	2014	—N/a	Performed at Tree: Live Tour 2014
"사랑한다 그 말을 못해서 (Because I couldn't say the words "I Love You")"	2014	The Night Watchman's Journal Original Soundtrack	
"Rise as One"	2015	Rise as God	
"Apology"	2015	Rise as God	
"In a Different Life"	2017	TVXQ! WEEK - STATION SPECIAL PACKAGE	
"Closer"	2018	New Chapter No. 1: The Chance of Love	Co-written by Duncan Laurence
"아스라이... (Beautiful Stranger)"	2018	New Chapter No. 2: The Truth of Love	
"Chocolate"	2020	Chocolate	
"All That Love"	2020	SM Station Season 4	
"Devil"	2022	Devil	
"Fever"	2023		
"Maniac"	2025		
"My Bad"	2025		

=== Lyric credits ===
Song	Year	Artist(s)	Originating album	Notes
"Evergreen"	2007	TVXQ	2007 Winter SMTown – Only Love	
"Love In the Ice"	2008	TVXQ	Mirotic	Korean version of "Love In the Ice"
"12시 34분 (Nothing Better)"	2009	TVXQ	2009 Summer SMTown – We are Shining	
"고백 (Confession)"	2011	Max Changmin	Keep Your Head Down	Also recorded in the original soundtrack for Paradise Ranch
"I Swear"	2012	TVXQ	Catch Me	
"기억을 따라서 (Everlasting)"	2012	TVXQ	Live World Tour: Catch Me in Seoul	Korean version of "Toki o Tomete"
"떠나지 못해 (Sleepless Night)"	2013	Shinee	Why So Serious? – The Misconceptions of Me	
"Rise..."	2014	TVXQ	Tense	
"Heaven's Day"	2014	Max Changmin	Spellbound	
"Ace"	2014	Taemin	Ace	
" 나의 생각, 너의 기억 (My Thoughts, Your Memories)"	2014	Kyuhyun	At Gwanghwamun	
"In a Different Life"	2017	Max Changmin		
"Sun & Rain"	2018	TVXQ	New Chapter No. 1: The Chance of Love	
"Jelly Love"	2018	TVXQ	New Chapter No. 2: The Truth of Love	
"아스라이... (Beautiful Stranger)"	2018	Max Changmin	New Chapter No. 2: The Truth of Love	
"Come a Little Closer" (너와 나)	2019	Leeteuk, Shindong, Eunhyuk, Donghae	Analog Trip Original Soundtrack	
"Chocolate"	2020	Max Changmin	Chocolate	
"No Tomorrow"	2020	Max Changmin	Chocolate	
"All That Love"	2020	Max Changmin	SM Station Season 4	
"Human"	2021	Max Changmin	Human	
"Devil"	2022	Max Changmin	Devil	
"Alien"	2022	Max Changmin	Devil	
"Hybrid"	2023	Max Changmin, Ha Hyun-woo	SM Station Season 4	Co-credited with Ha Hyun-woo
"Promise"	2023	TVXQ	20&2	

== Filmography ==
=== Film ===
Title	Year	Role	Notes
Dating on Earth	2009	Changmin	Direct-to-video
I AM.	2012	Himself	Documentary film
Fly with the Gold	2012	Momo	
SMTOWN The Stage	2015	Himself	Documentary film

=== Television series ===
Title	Year	Role	Notes	Ref.
Banjun Drama	2005–06	Various roles	Main role	
Vacation	2006	Himself	Episode: "Beautiful Life"	
Athena: Goddess of War	2010	Choi Tae-hyun	Guest role	
Paradise Ranch	2011	Han Dong-joo	Main role	
Welcome to the Show	2011	Himself	Cameo (Episode 1)	
Saki	2013	Cafe customer	Cameo (Episode 11)	
Mimi	2014	Han Min-woo	Main role	
The Scholar Who Walks the Night	2015	Crown Prince Lee Yoon	Main role	
Tensai Bakabon 3	2018	Hotel porter	Cameo	

=== Musical ===
Title	Year	Role	Notes
Hologram Musical: School Oz	2015	Oscar	Main role
Benjamin Button	2024	Benjamin Button	Main role

=== Variety show ===
Title	Year	Role	Notes	Ref.
Explorers of the Human Body	2007	Cast member	2 episodes	
Moonlight Prince	2013	Co-host		
Cool Kiz On The Block	2013–14	Cast member		
Kingdom: Legendary War	2021	Host		
Max Changmin's Free Hug	2021–22	Host	2 seasons	
Drink with God 2	2021	Special MC	1 episode	
Bistro Shigor	2021	Cast member		
내:일을 여는 인문학	2022	Cast member		
My Teenage Boy	2023	Host		
The Return of Superman	2023	Narrator		

=== Other shows ===
Title	Year	Notes	Ref.
72 Hours of TVXQ	2018	Himself	
Analog Trip	2019	Himself	
Check This Out	2021	Himself	
Changminho's Buddy Birdie	2022	Himself	
Duckbap House	2025	Himself	

== Awards and nominations ==
Award	Year	Category	Recipient	Result	Ref.
Hochi Film Awards	2012	Best New Artist	Fly with the Gold	Nominated	
Japan Academy Awards	2013	Newcomer of the Year	Fly with the Gold	Won	
Japan Film Critics Awards	2013	Best New Artist	Fly with the Gold	Won	
KBS Entertainment Awards	2013	Best Entertainer (Variety)	Cool Kiz On The Block	Won	
KBS Entertainment Awards	2013	Best Newcomer	Moonlight Prince	Nominated	
