= SM F&B Development =

South Korean company

SM F&B Development Co., Ltd.
- Native name: 에스엠에프앤비디벨롭먼트
- Company type: Private
- Industry: Food importing; Franchising; Restaurant; Wholesaling
- Founded: January 22, 2008; 18 years ago
- Defunct: November 30, 2021
- Fate: Liquidated
- Headquarters: 125-24, Cheongdam-dong, Gangnam District, Seoul, South Korea
- Key people: Yoo Seong-ho (Representative director)
- Parent: SM Entertainment

SM F&B Development (Korean: 에스엠에프앤비디벨롭먼트; SM F&B) was a South Korean restaurant, franchising, food-importing, and wholesaling company under SM Entertainment. The company was established on January 22, 2008, and has previously operated the restaurant business E-Table, but eventually closed, Chi Mc, but the opening was revoked, and Podonamu in Tokyo for food and Hallyu promotions. It currently runs the casual dining and fine dining restaurant SMT House located in Cheongdam-dong, Gangnam District, Seoul, and has expansions in Tokyo and Los Angeles. As it sold all its assets, the company was eventually liquidated.

== History ==
SM F&B Development, a subsidiary of SM Entertainment, was established in 2008 to challenge the restaurant business but has not achieved "remarkable" results. In 2008, the company opened E-Table, a Korean restaurant, but was ceased for operation in 2011. By 2012, the company tried to open a pub, Chi Mc, in partnership with hamburger chain Kraze, but the project was canceled eventually. SM has also previously promoted the food and Hallyu relationship by opening Podonamu in Tokyo. On December 1, 2015, it was announced that the company was planning to open SMT Seoul in Cheongdam-dong, Gangnam District, Seoul, in the same month. An official from SM F&B stated that SM had reinterpreted diverse cultures to create its contents not limited to music and entertainment but essential lifestyle factors such as combining creative elements like music in the restaurant field. The dining space will operate as a casual dining and fine dining restaurant based on tapas menus.

SM F&B has also become a support center for North Korean defectors. The company is considered the cause of SM Group's capital erosion by recording net losses every year and has also suffered a deficit of 5.34 billion won in the fiscal year 2019. On October 5, 2021, SM announced that SM Entertainment Japan decided to merge with SM F&B Development Japan based on the Japanese company law to reduce costs and enhance management efficiency by integrating management resources. With a merger ratio of 1:0 and a merger date on December 1, the merged entity owns 100 percent of the merged entity and does not issue new shares in the merger. As the COVID-19 pandemic crippled the restaurant industry, the merger was taken into effect marking the company's withdrawal from the Japanese restaurant market. SM F&B was liquidated as it sold its assets and received 27.2 billion won.

== Brands ==
- SMT House (SMT Tokyo, SMT LA)

Defunct

- Podonamu
- E-Table

Cancelled

- Chi Mc

== Former division ==
- SM F&B Development Japan

== Awards ==
Name of publisher, year listed, award won, and recipient of SM F&B Development
Publisher	Year	Award	Recipient	Ref.
KOREAT	2017	100 People's List	Lee Jeong-hwa	
