= Keyword (song) =

"Keyword / Maze"

Single by Tohoshinki
- Released: March 12, 2008
- Recorded: 2008
- Genre: J-Pop
- Label: Avex Trax/Rhythm Zone
- Songwriters: Lyrics: H.U.B. Composition: AKIRA; Arrangement: AKIRA

Tohoshinki singles chronology
"Close to You / Crazy Life" (2008)	"Keyword / Maze" (2008)	"Beautiful You / Sennen Koi Uta" (2008)

"Keywords / Maze" is Tohoshinki's 21st Japanese single, released on March 12, 2008. The single is the fifth and last installment of the song "Trick" in the album T. It sold the most copies out of the TRICK singles in the first week, with a total of 21,097.

== Track listing ==
=== CD ===
1. "Keyword"
2. "Maze" (Jejung from 東方神起)
3. "Keyword" (Less Vocal)
4. "Maze" (Less Vocal) (Jejung from 東方神起)

== Release history ==
Country	Date
Japan	March 12, 2008
South Korea	March 12, 2008

== Charts ==
=== Oricon sales charts (Japan) ===
Release	Chart	Peak position	Sales total
March 12, 2008	Oricon Daily Singles Chart	5	
March 12, 2008	Oricon Weekly Singles Chart	7	21,097
March 12, 2008	Oricon Yearly Singles Chart	275	26,675

=== Korea Top 20 foreign albums and singles ===
Release	Chart	Peak position	Sales total
March 13, 2008	March Monthly Chart	1	12,000
