= Close to You (Tohoshinki song) =

"Close to You / Crazy Life"

Single by Tohoshinki
- Released: March 5, 2008
- Recorded: 2007
- Genre: J-pop
- Label: Avex Trax/Rhythm Zone
- Songwriters: Lyrics: Composition: Arrangement:

Tohoshinki singles chronology
"If... / Rainy Night" (2008)	"Close to You / Crazy Life" (2008)	"Keyword / Maze" (2008)

"Close to You / Crazy Life (Yunho from 東方神起)" is Tohoshinki's 20th Japanese single, released on March 5, 2008. The single is the fourth installment of the song "Trick" in the album T.

== Track listing ==
=== CD ===
1. "Close to You"
2. "Crazy Life" (Yunho from 東方神起)
3. "Close to You" (Less Vocal)
4. "Crazy Life" (Less Vocal) (Yunho from 東方神起)

== Release history ==
Country	Date
Japan	March 5, 2008
South Korea	March 5, 2008

== Chart rankings and sales ==
=== Oricon sales charts (Japan) ===
Release	Chart	Peak position	Sales total
March 5, 2008	Oricon Daily Singles Chart	3	4,368
March 5, 2008	Oricon Weekly Singles Chart	9	14,842
March 5, 2008	Oricon Yearly Singles Chart	351	20,379

=== Korea Top 20 foreign albums and singles ===
Release	Chart	Peak position	Sales total
March 7, 2008	March Monthly Chart	2	11,760
