= If... (TVXQ song) =

"If...!? / Rainy Night"

Single by Tohoshinki
- Released: February 27, 2008
- Recorded: 2007
- Genre: J-Pop
- Label: Avex Trax/Rhythm Zone
- Songwriters: Lyrics: H.U.B. Composition: Junsu, AKIRA; Arrangement: Yuchun, h-wonder, Udai Shika, AKIRA

Tohoshinki singles chronology
"Runaway / My Girlfriend" (2008)	"If...!? / Rainy Night" (2008)	"Close to You / Crazy Life" (2008)

"If...!? / Rainy Night (Junsu from 東方神起)" is Tohoshinki's 19th Japanese single, released on February 27, 2008. The single is the third installment of the song "TRICK" in the album T. It is currently the longest Oricon charting single from the TRICK project, with 32,939 singles over 29 weeks.

== Track listing ==
=== CD ===
1. "If...!?"
2. "Rainy Night" (Junsu from 東方神起)
3. "If...!?" (Less Vocal)
4. "Rainy Night" (Less Vocal) (Junsu from 東方神起)

== Release history ==
Country	Date
Japan	February 27, 2008
South Korea	February 27, 2008

== Chart rankings and sales ==
=== Oricon sales chart (Japan) ===
Chart	Peak position	Sales total
Oricon Daily Singles Chart (February 27, 2008)	5	
Oricon Weekly Singles Chart (Week 1)	12	18,689
Oricon Monthly Singles Chart (February)	30	
Oricon Yearly Singles Chart (2008)	286	25,702

=== Korea Top 20 foreign albums & singles ===
Release	Chart	Peak position	Sales
February 27, 2008	February Monthly Chart	1	9,900
February 27, 2008	March Monthly Chart	9	2,546
