= Runaway (Tohoshinki song) =

"Runaway / My Girlfriend"

Single by Tohoshinki
- Released: February 13, 2008
- Recorded: 2007
- Genre: J-Pop
- Length: 4 minutes 10 seconds ( 4:10 )
- Label: Avex Trax/Rhythm Zone
- Songwriters: Lyrics:Park YooChun / YuChun; Composition:Jun Suyama; Arrangement:Jun Suyama

Tohoshinki singles chronology
"Two Hearts / Wild Soul" (2008)	"Runaway / My Girlfriend" (2008)	"If... / Rainy Night" (2008)

"Runaway / My Girlfriend (Yuchun from 東方神起)" is Tohoshinki's 18th Japanese single, released on February 13, 2008. The single is the second installment of the song "Trick" in the album T.

== Track listing ==
=== CD ===
1. "Runaway"
2. "My Girlfriend" (Yuchun from 東方神起)
3. "Runaway" -Less Vocal‐
4. "My Girlfriend" ‐Less Vocal‐ (Yuchun from 東方神起)

== Release history ==
Country	Date
Japan	February 13, 2008
South Korea	February 20, 2008

== Charts ==
=== Oricon Sales Chart (Japan) ===
Chart	Peak position	Sales total
Oricon Daily Singles Chart (February 13, 2008)	4	
Oricon Weekly Singles Chart (Week 1)	8	18,371
Oricon Yearly Singles Chart (2008)	282	26,070

=== Korea Top 20 foreign albums & singles ===
Release	Chart	Peak position	Sales
February 20, 2008	February Monthly Chart	4	7,000
February 20, 2008	March Monthly Chart	4	3,674
