= Dōshite Kimi o Suki ni Natte Shimattandarō? =

Single by Tohoshinki

from the album The Secret Code
- B-side: "Box in the Ship"
- Released: July 16, 2008
- Recorded: 2008
- Genre: J-pop; synthpop; soul
- Length: 3:18
- Label: SM Entertainment Japan * Avex Trax * Rhythm Zone
- Songwriter: Lambsey
- Producers: Fredrik "Fredro" Odesjo; Sylvia Bennett-Smith; Mats Berntoft

Tohoshinki singles chronology
"Beautiful You / Sennen Koi Uta" (2008)	"Dōshite Kimi o Suki ni Natte Shimattandarō?" (2008)	"Mirotic" (2008)

Music video
- "Dōshite Kimi o Suki ni Natte Shimattandarō?" on YouTube

"Dōshite Kimi o Suki ni Natte Shimattandarō?" (どうして君を好きになってしまったんだろう？, lit. Why Did I Have to End Up Falling Completely in Love with You?), released on July 16, 2008, is Tōhōshinki's 23rd Japanese single. Approximately two months prior to the official release of the song, a leak of the recording grossed many hits on the internet.

On July 22, 2008, Tohoshinki became the first non-Japanese Asian artist to have three number one hits on the weekly Oricon singles chart, when their single "Dōshite Kimi o Suki ni Natte Shimattandarō?" attained the number one position with weekly sales of 68,417 copies. After Tohoshinki's invitation and performance in the prestigious Japanese year-end music festival, Kōhaku Uta Gassen, the group saw a surge in sales yet again in 2009 as well as interest in the music video on online streaming sites from Japanese viewers.

== Music video ==
Two music videos were created, one featuring TVXQ group members while the other features a story. The drama version was released on June 24, 2008. According to management, the drama version was made especially for viewers who were not necessarily fans of the group and wanted to simply appreciate the song and its meaning.

The drama version feature Mina Fujii and Kouki Murakami. Kouki's character falls in love with Mina's character, but she gets married before he could confess his feelings.

== Track listing ==
No.	Title	Lyrics	Music	Length
1.	"Dōshite Kimi o Suki ni Natte Shimattandarō?" (どうして君を好きになってしまったんだろう？ Why did I have to end up falling completely in love with you?)	Lambsey	Fredrik "Fredro" Odesjo, Sylvia Bennett-Smith, Mats Berntoft	3:18
2.	"Box in the Ship"	H.u.b	Philippe-Marc Anquetil, Iain James Farqharson, Marcus Killian, Yacine Azeggagh	4:14
3.	"Dōshite Kimi o Suki ni Natte Shimattandarō? (Acapella ver.)" (どうして君を好きになってしまったんだろう？(アカペラver.))	Lambsey	Fredrik "Fredro" Odesjo, Sylvia Bennett-Smith, Mats Berntoft	3:18
4.	"Dōshite Kimi o Suki ni Natte Shimattandarō? (Less Vocal)"		Fredrik "Fredro" Odesjo, Sylvia Bennett-Smith, Mats Berntoft	3:18
5.	"Box in the Ship (Less Vocal)"		Philippe-Marc Anquetil, Iain James Farqharson, Marcus Killian, Yacine Azeggagh	4:14

DVD
No.	Title	Length
1.	"Dōshite Kimi o Suki ni Natte Shimattandarō? (Video Clip)"
2.	"Off Shot Movie" (Limited Edition only)

== Charts ==
=== Weekly charts ===
Chart (2008–2009)	Peak position
Japan (Japan Hot 100)	6
Japan (Oricon)	1
Japan (RIAJ Digital Track Chart)	17

=== Monthly charts ===
Chart (2008)	Peak position
Japan Singles (Oricon)	8

=== Year-end charts ===
Chart (2008)	Position
Japan Singles (Oricon)	78

== Sales and certifications ==
Region	Certification	Certified units/sales
Japan (RIAJ)	Gold	117,277

== Release history ==
Country	Date
Japan	July 16, 2008
South Korea	July 16, 2008
