= SMEJ Holdings =

Japanese company

SMEJ Holdings Inc.
- Formerly: SM Entertainment Japan
- Type: Holding
- Founded: January 22, 2001; 25 years ago
- Headquarters: Minami-Aoyama, Minato, Tokyo, Japan
- Key people: Tak Young-jun (Representative director)
- Parent: SM Entertainment
- Subsidiaries: SM Entertainment Japan; SMEJ Plus
- Website: smtown.jp

SMEJ Holdings, formerly known as SM Entertainment Japan, is the Japanese subsidiary of the South Korean entertainment company SM Entertainment. The company currently functions as a holding company that oversees its subsidiaries. It was established on January 22, 2001, with the Japanese record label Avex and Japanese television production company Yoshimoto Kogyo.

== History ==
=== 2001–2012: Establishment and Japanese market entry ===
First SM Entertainment Japan logo

In an article released by Kukmin Ilbo, Lee Soo-man mentioned forming a Japanese subsidiary of SM Entertainment, SM Japan, regarding S.E.S. and its artists releasing Japanese-language releases from record companies in Japan rather than being released directly from SM. It was then announced that SM Japan would be established in a joint venture with Yoshimoto Kogyo, EAPS, Kurita Hideichi, and Pronet, investing 358.3 million won. The company was also launched along with the Japanese record label Avex. On March 7, 2001, SM held an event at Velfarre, a club located in Tokyo, to officially announce the establishment of SM Japan and BoA's entry into Japan with the release of the Jumping into the World album and was preparing to operate as an agency essential for Korean performers entering Japan. The company is employed in the premier management of SM artists in Japan, operates sole license rights for the sales of albums, digital music, and merchandise, and advertises the concert industry for concerts and fan meetings held in Japan. It was then reported that TVXQ was preparing to enter the market with a Japanese single to be released on April 27, 2005, while learning the language from the company's manager.

Lee Soo-man acknowledged the significance of overseas expansion in 2001 when overseas marketing was bare and has played a role in penetrating the Japanese market with BoA and Trax, with Nam So-young as the company's chief executive officer (CEO). (Note: Nam So-young became the CEO of KeyEast, and Kim Young-min became the CEO of SM Studios due to doubts about the composition of the board of directors filled with people influenced by Lee Soo-man.) With the success of BoA and TVXQ in the Japanese music market, J-Min, an artist of SM Entertainment Japan, debuted with the extended play Korogaru Ringo through Avex on September 12. On October 10, 2008, SM Japan established a subsidiary and opened a Korean food restaurant called Podo Namu on Nishi-Azabu in Tokyo, a restaurant specializing in developing and presenting Korean home cooking as a "luxury" dish. Through Avex's official website, the company and Avex Group had recently signed exclusive contracts with Super Junior and f(x) while introducing TVXQ's Yunho and Changmin, as Avex previously decided to remove JYJ members who had a conflict with SM. In an interview with Kim Young-min, he stated that SM previously authorized management along with the distribution of albums with SM Japan had been independently shifting performances and advertisements for Girls' Generation and its artists with comprehensive research and experience in the Japanese market in 2010.

=== 2013–2019: Further ventures, mergers, and acquisitions ===
SM Entertainment Group, which started producing video content in various fields through SM Culture & Contents (SM C&C), established SM Contents Investment (SMCI) to guarantee quality content. SMCI was launched with the investment of SM Entertainment Japan to operate the network and facilitate diverse overseas projects. Kim Young-min, inaugurated as CEO of SM Entertainment in May 2005, became a representative of overseas subsidiaries, SM Asia and SM Japan. It was reported that the company recorded losses due to its "intensive" investment in temporary costs to establish a management system in the first quarter, with the annual operating profit in 2012 exceeding 10 billion won as of the March 2013 accounting settlement. Previously, SM, Avex Vanguard (AVI), and Universal Music Japan established a joint venture, Everysing Japan, in May 2014 and is currently a subsidiary of SM Japan as per its website. On June 23, 2014, SM stated that it was ordered to pay 10.2 billion won in corporate tax while asserting the additional corporate tax payment was due to the difference in the foreign tax deduction limit for sales generated by SM Japan.

A news article released by Maeil Business Newspaper declared that SM Japan had already achieved K-pop localization and attracted more than 2.1 million concert goers in 2015, establishing a 15% growth from 2014. As part of Shinee's promotion for the group's "Kiminoseide" (2016) release, Shinyan, an imitation of the group members and is under the company, will debut with the song "Kiminoseide (For Cat)" (2016) to offer their music more intimately to the public through cats. On August 12, 2016, SM Japan announced that it had decided to invest approximately 13 billion won in Digital Adventure (DA), a JASDAQ-listed company and a Japanese subsidiary of KeyEast. The announcement was made when SM and KeyEast signed a business agreement as a strategic partner to establish business partnerships in various fields. Consequently, the company was expected to become the second-largest shareholder as it invested in DA with a third-party paid-in capital increase. In September 2016, the company started capital participation with Stream Media Corporation (SMC) as per the company history page on SMC's official website.

IRiver then merged with SM Mobile Communications (SM MC) and acquired a 100% stake in SM Life Design Company Japan (SM LDC), a subsidiary of SM Japan, with 30 billion won of the endowment amount. SM LDC was a company dedicated to distributing SM content and goods in Japan.

=== 2020–present: Company restructuring and transition to SMEJ Holdings ===
On April 13, 2020, SM announced that SM Entertainment Japan had established its subsidiaries SMEJ and SMEJ Plus through a physical separation, in which SM Japan transferred all of its operations—except for the fan club business—to SMEJ, which were then transferred to SMEJ Plus. By August 1, SMEJ was absorbed into Stream Media Corporation (SMC) and dissolved, resulting in SMC managing SM artists in Japan. On October 5, 2021, SM announced that its subsidiary SM Entertainment Japan would merge with SM F&B Development Japan, based on Japanese company law, aiming to reduce costs and enhance management efficiency by incorporating management resources. The merger date happened on December 1 with a ratio of 1:0, citing that the merger company owns 100% of the stake in the consolidation organization and does not issue new shares. On June 1, 2025, SMC changed its name to SM Entertainment Japan. Accordingly, SM Entertainment Japan also changed its name to SMEJ Holdings.

== Subsidiaries ==
- Everysing Japan (2014)
- SM Entertainment Japan (2016)
- SMEJ Plus (2020)

Former subsidiaries

- SM Life Design Company Japan
- SM F&B Development Japan
- Beyond Live Corporation

== Artists ==
- Shohei

=== Original IP ===
- GPP
- Kiepi

=== Japan management only ===
- Park Jinyoung
- TripleS
