= Bolero / Kiss the Baby Sky / Wasurenaide =

Single by Tohoshinki

from the album The Secret Code
- Released: January 21, 2009
- Recorded: 2008
- Genre: "Bolero" J-pop, R&B, soul "Kiss the Baby Sky" Soft rock, R&B "Wasurenaide" Pop
- Label: Rhythm Zone

Tohoshinki singles chronology
"Wrong Number" (2008)	"Bolero / Kiss the Baby Sky / Wasurenaide" (2009)	"Survivor" (2009)

Music video
- "Bolero" on YouTube "Kiss the Baby Sky" on YouTube

"Bolero / Kiss the Baby Sky / Wasurenaide" (Bolero / Kiss the Baby Sky / 忘れないで, Borero / Kisu Za Beibī Sukai / Wasurenaide; lit. Bolero / Kiss the Baby Sky / Don't Forget) is Tohoshinki's 25th Japanese single, released on January 21, 2009. Bolero was the theme song for the Japanese movie, "Subaru (昴)". The movie is named after the ballerina lead named Subaru, which released on March 20, 2009. Tohoshinki made their debut screen on Subaru. The members of Tohoshinki appeared in one scene in which Meisa Kuroki’s character visited a bar; where they performed on a stage during the scene.

By the beginning of February, the single was announced to receive Platinum Disc Certificate by Japan Association of Records on February 10, 2009 for reaching 101,861 in sales.

== Track listing ==
=== CD ===
1. "Bolero"
2. "Kiss the Baby Sky"
3. "Wasurenaide"
4. "Dōshite Kimi o Suki ni Natte Shimattandarō?" (Royal Mirrorball Mix) (CD Version Only)
5. "Bolero" (Less Vocal)
6. "Kiss the Baby Sky" (Less Vocal)
7. "Wasurenaide" (Less Vocal)

DVD

1. "Bolero" (Video clip)
2. Off Shot Movie

== Charts ==
=== Oricon sales chart (Japan) ===
Release	Chart	Peak position	Sales total
January 21, 2009	Oricon Daily Singles Chart	1	62,732
January 21, 2009	Oricon Weekly Singles Chart	1	89,701
January 21, 2009	Oricon Monthly Singles Chart	4	109,612
January 21, 2009	Oricon Yearly Singles Chart	49	110,717
