= Two Hearts (Tohoshinki song) =

"Two Hearts / Wild Soul"

Single by Tohoshinki
- Released: February 6, 2008
- Recorded: 2007
- Genre: J-Pop
- Length: 4:20
- Label: Avex Trax/Rhythm Zone
- Songwriters: Lyrics: H.u.b, Ryoji Sonoda; Composition: AKIRA, Corin; Arrangement: AKIRA, Corin

Tohoshinki singles chronology
"Purple Line" (2008)	"Two Hearts / Wild Soul" (2008)	"Runaway / My Girlfriend" (2008)

"Two Hearts / Wild Soul (Changmin from 東方神起)" is Tohoshinki's 17th Japanese single, released on February 6, 2008. The single is the first installment of the song "TRICK" in the album T.

== Track list ==
No.	Title	Lyrics	Music	Length
1.	"Two Hearts"	H.u.b	AKIRA	4:20
2.	"Wild Soul (Changmin from 東方神起)" (Changmin solo)	Ryoji Sonoda	Corin	4:02
3.	"Two Hearts (Less Vocal)"		AKIRA	4:20
4.	"Wild Soul (Less Vocal)"		Corin	4:00
Total length:				16:44

== Release history ==
Country	Date
Japan	February 6, 2008
South Korea	February 13, 2008

== Charts ==
=== Oricon Sales Chart (Japan) ===
Chart	Peak position	Sales total
Oricon Daily Singles Chart (February 6, 2008)	10	
Oricon Weekly Singles Chart (Week 1)	13	14,898
Oricon Yearly Singles Chart (2008)	323	23,046

=== Korea Top 20 foreign albums & singles ===
Release	Chart	Peak position	Sales
February 13, 2008	February Monthly Chart	2	8,476
February 13, 2008	March Monthly Chart	15	1,811
