= Gun Crazy 3: Traitor's Rhapsody =

Gun Crazy 3: The Big Gundown
- Directed by: Atsushi Muroga
- Produced by: Shochiku
- Starring: Kasumi Nakane
- Cinematography: Haruhisa Taguchi
- Music by: Goro Yasukawa
- Distributed by: Pioneer LDC
- Release date: May 10, 2003
- Running time: 71 min.
- Country: Japan
- Language: Japanese

Gun Crazy 3: The Big Gundown (叛逆者の狂詩曲(ラプソディー), Hangyakusha no kyoushikyoku; Gun Crazy 3: Traitor's Rhapsody) is a 2003 Japanese action movie, starring Kasumi Nakane. A sequel to Gun Crazy: A Woman from Nowhere, it was also directed by Atsushi Muroga.

== Cast ==
- Kasumi Nakane
- Mitsuho Otani
- Hiroshi Fuse
- Yasukaze Motomiya
- Jin Nakayama
