= Kasumi Nakane =

Japanese model

Kasumi Nakane 仲根かすみ
- Born: Kasumi Nakasone; April 3, 1982 (age 44); Tokyo, Japan
- Occupation: Gravure idol
- Years active: 1993–2005
- Height: 1.64 m (5 ft 5 in)
- Spouse: Tsuyoshi Wada (m. 2005)

Kasumi Nakane (仲根かすみ, Nakane Kasumi) is a Japanese model, gravure idol, and actress born on 1982-04-03 in Higashiōsaka, Osaka and raised in Tokyo, Japan. Her birth name was Kasumi Nakasone (仲宗根かすみ, Nakasone Kasumi), and she formerly worked under the name Kasumi Ue (植可澄美, Ue Kasumi). She graduated from the private Horikoshi High School, the same school attended by talent such as Yoko Minamino, Yōko Oginome, Ai Katō, and Masumi Miyazaki.

== History ==
In 1993, Nakane joined the Nezumikko Club, an all-girl idol group composed of Nakane, Natsu Itō, Kana Itō, Sato Higashi, Ami Yamazaki, Emiko Inoue, Juri Miyazawa, and Chiaki Nakajima. The group was created to ride on the popularity of such groups as Onyanko Club. The group released two albums, both in 1993. In 1996, she began working as a gravure idol, gaining success due to having a larger bust for her age. Nakane began appearing in 1999 in drama series, as well as in variety, sports, educational, and other television programs.

She married Japanese baseball player Tsuyoshi Wada on 2005-12-10. She gave birth to their first daughter on September 13, 2006.

Nakane has been a spokesperson for MSN at the WPB Expo in Tokyo. She helped launch a "morning wake-up call" service in 2002 by personally calling five customers selected at random as part of the service. In 2004, she participated in a Yahoo! chat session to promote the release of her DVD box set Nakane Kasumi Memories Box "Merci!" in which over 6700 individuals participated by submitting over 3700 questions. She is represented by the talent management firm Big Apple.

== Media ==
=== Filmography ===
- Gun Crazy 3: The Big Gundown (2003)

=== DVD and video releases ===
- Digital Playboy Vol.2 Kasumi Nakane (デジタルプレイボーイVol.2 仲根かすみ, Dejitaru Pureibōi Borūmu Tsū Nakane Kasumi) (January 2001, ISBN 4-08-900506-X, Shueisha)
- S’il vous plait (April 2003, ISBN 4-8124-1151-3, Takeshobo)
- WPB-net Remix DVD Kasumi Nakane "Slow Life, Sweet Love" (WPB-net REMIX DVD 仲根かすみ「SLOW LIFE, SWEET LOVE」) (2004-07-16, ISBN 4-08-900511-6, Shueisha)
- Summer Memories (夏の思い出, Natsu no Omoide) (November 2005, ISBN 4-8124-2431-3, Takeshobo)

=== Photo books ===
- 17/That Summer (17/あの夏。—仲根かすみファースト写真集, Jūnana/Ano Natsu: Nakane Kasumi Fāsuto Shasshinshū) (September 1999, ISBN 4-8342-5205-1, Home-sha)
- 18/Mi Pasión (18/Mi Pasión, Jūhachi/Mi Pashion) (September 2000, ISBN 4-8342-5206-X, Home-sha)
- Telephone Card Book G-taste: Kasumi Nakane Edition (トレカブックG-taste仲根かすみ編, Tereka Bukku Jī-teisuto Nakane Kasumi Hen) (April 2001, ISBN 4-06-345154-2, Kodansha)
- Searching for Summer (夏をさがして, Natsu o Sagashite) (August 2001, ISBN 4-88787-005-1, DigiCube)
- Hana Kasumi (花霞み, Hana Kasumi) (December 2001, ISBN 4-08-780340-6, Shueisha)
- Summer and Kasumi and the Sun... (夏とかすみと太陽と…, Natsu to Kasumi to Taiyō to...) (September 2002, ISBN 4-88787-051-5, DigiCube)
- Kasumi Nakane (仲根かすみ, Nakane Kasumi) (September 2002, ISBN 4-09-104013-6, Shogakukan, Young Sunday Special Graphic Vol.2)
- 20/Vas-y! Kasumi Nakane Photo Essay (20/Vas‐y!—仲根かすみフォトエッセイ, Nijū/Vashī!: Nakane Kasumi Foto Essei) (November 2002, ISBN 4-8342-5211-6, Home-sha, includes a DVD)
- August Dream Photo Story Book (八月の幻 フォト・ストーリー・ブック, Hachigatsu Foto Sutōrī Bukku) (November 2002, ISBN 4-8124-1103-3, Takeshobo)
- Passion: Kasumi Nakane Gun Crazy Photobook (PASSION—仲根かすみGUN CRAZY写真集, Passhon: Nakane Kasumi Gan Kureiji Shasshinshū) (2003-04-26, ISBN 4-89452-701-4, Pioneer LDC)
- S’il vous plait (April 2003, ISBN 4-8124-1149-1, Takeshobo)
- Kasumi (かすみ) (2003-07-04, ISBN 4-8124-1248-X, Takeshobo)
- At the End of Summer (夏の終わりに, Natsu no Owari ni) (August 2003, ISBN 4-88787-134-1, DigiCube)
- À la Mer To the Sea (À LA MER 海へ, A ru Mea Umi e) (November 2003, ISBN 4-06-352803-0, Kodansha)
- Kasumi Nakane Vintage 19*20*21 (仲根かすみ VINTAGE19*20*21) (January 2004, ISBN 4-09-372081-9, Shogakukan)
- Kasumi Nakane: Kasumi-X (仲根かすみ KASUMI-X, Nakane Kasumi: Kasumi-Ekkusu) (2004-04-02, ISBN 4-8342-4013-4, Shueisha)
- Unplugged (2004-12-01, ISBN 4-05-402627-3, Gakken)
- Shizuku (2005-12-19)
- Kasumi Nakane Last Photobook (仲根かすみラスト写真集, Nakane Kasumi Rasuto Shasshinshū) (2005-12-22, ISBN 4-06-307865-5, Kodansha)
- Style (2006-01-25, ISBN 4-88993-573-8, Traidia)

=== Other books ===
- Girls' Stories (少女小説, Shōjo Shōsetsu) (February 2006, ISBN 4-575-47813-X, Futabasha)

Media sources:
