= Junk (2000 film) =

2000 Japanese horror film

- Promotional release poster
- Directed by: Atsushi Muroga
- Written by: Atsushi Muroga
- Produced by: Isao Kurosu
- Starring: Kaori Shimamura; Osamu Ehara; Miwa; Tate Gouta; Patrick Jones; Yuji Kishimoto
- Cinematography: Takanobu Kato
- Music by: Goro Yasukawa
- Distributed by: Japan Home Video
- Release date: 2000
- Running time: 83 minutes
- Country: Japan
- Languages: Japanese; English

Junk (Japanese: JUNK 死霊狩り, Hepburn: Junk Shiryōgari; lit. "Junk Zombie Hunter") is a 2000 Japanese horror film written and directed by Atsushi Muroga. A blend of the yakuza and zombie film genres, Junk stars Kaori Shimamura as Saki, a member of a group of jewel thieves. While attempting to deliver stolen goods from a heist to another criminal gang, the thieves must fight to survive against a horde of zombies resulting from secret experiments by the United States military.

Following the success of the 1998 horror film Ring, Muroga, known for making action and yakuza films, decided to create a film in the horror genre. Junk was shot in Okinawa, Japan, with the cast and crew making use of real meat from a local market for many of its gore effects. The film received generally negative reviews from critics, with some considering it derivative of other works.

== Plot ==
American doctor Kinderman injects a chemical known as "DNX", designed to re-animate dead bodies, into the body of a deceased, nude Japanese woman. The woman comes back to life and kills Kinderman by tearing flesh from his neck, before attacking his assistant Sharon.

Three gangsters—Jun, Kabu, and Akira—don masks and rob a jewelry store, while their getaway driver, Saki, waits outside in a van. During the heist, one of the store employees stabs Akira in the foot with a pair of scissors. They escape with Saki and make arrangements to meet a yakuza gang led by Ramon at an old factory, to negotiate selling the stolen goods. Elsewhere, Dr. Takashi Nakada, who helped develop DNX, is escorted by US soldiers to Colonel McGriff. McGriff informs Nakada, who believed that development on DNX had been abandoned two years prior, has continued under the direction of the US military in an old building—the factory where the thieves have arranged to meet the yakuza.

At the factory, Saki tends to Akira's injury. She ventures into the building in search of running water to clean his wound. Jun follows, and after Saki rejects his attempt to make an advance on her, is killed by a zombie. Saki, Akira, and Kabu hear Jun scream and investigate, finding chemical equipment as well as a room containing a number of bagged corpses. They soon find Jun's body, being eaten by zombies. Kabu and Akira kill the zombies by shooting them in the head.

Fleeing the factory, the trio encounter Ramon and his gang. The trio hand over the stolen jewels, but the yakuza, instead of paying them, draws guns on them. Kabu draws his own gun but is fatally shot. A zombified Jun attacks one of the yakuza, and is shot in the head. Ramon's two remaining partners pursue Saki and Akira further into the building, and unwittingly cause containers of DNX to spill on the bagged corpses, re-animating them. Akira manages to kill one of the yakuza members. Meanwhile, Nakada, McGriff, and Sgt. Davis attempt to remotely activate the factory's self-destruct system. However, the nude female zombie who killed Kinderman disables the countdown, and sends them a message: "I LOVE YOU ......K".

Saki and Akira resolve to retrieve the jewels. At the same time, Nakada and Davis board a helicopter and head to the factory. Ramon's one remaining partner finds Ramon being devoured by zombies. Ramon then revives as a zombie and bites him. Saki shoots and kills Ramon, retrieves the jewels, and is attacked by another zombie, whom she stabs in the forehead. Running back to Akira, Saki falls through the floor. Akira heads downstairs and finds the jewels, but not Saki. Nakada and Davis land at and enter the factory, while Akira escapes in the van. Saki is cornered by zombies, but an armed Nakada saves her.

Davis fixes the self-destruct system, but is killed before he can activate it. Nakada encounters the nude female zombie, whom he recognizes as Kyoko, his wife who died in a car accident. As Saki tries to flee the building, she is confronted by Kyoko, who has decapitated Nakada. Saki shoots Kyoko in the head, but Kyoko does not die. Akira returns and cuts Kyoko in half with a shovel. Saki and Akira activate the self-destruct system and, in their escape, Akira is attacked by a legless Kyoko. Saki throws Kyoko into a high voltage box, electrocuting her. Saki and Akira throw themselves through a window as the building explodes, and land in a body of water.

McGriff informs an official that work on the DNX program can be restarted at any time. Saki and Akira drive away from the wreckage of the factory in a sports car delivered by a car salesman at Akira's request. In the rubble of the building, the hand of a zombie rises.

== Cast ==
- Kaori Shimamura as Saki: the getaway driver for a group of jewelry thieves, and a former hospital nurse
- Yuji Kishimoto as Dr. Takashi Nakada: a scientist who worked on the development of DNX, a chemical that can re-animate the dead
- Osamu Ehara as Akira: one of the jewel thieves, who is stabbed in the foot during the heist
- Miwa as Kyoko: an intelligent and agile "superzombie" with the ability to talk
- Tate Gouta as Ramon: the leader of a yakuza gang
- Nobuyuki Asano as Jun: one of the jewel thieves
- Koutarou Tanaka as Toraji
- Masahiko Matsushita
- Yoshifumi Shigemura
- Yoji Sasaki
- Patrick Jones as Sgt. Davis
- Mark C. Moorhouse as Colonel McGriff
- Deborah Joy Vinall as Sharon (credited as "Debolar Joy Vinall")

== Themes ==
Author Mark N. Mays perceived an element of social commentary in Junk, noting the real-life presence of US military bases on Okinawa Island and writing that, "it appears seemingly true that no matter what the natives do to interfere, the US military bases will remain on the island, as in the film where the base commander promises to continue the DNX experiments."

In an interview with Fangoria, when asked if the film makes a statement about the presence of the US military around the world, writer-director Atsushi Muroga replied: "What are you asking? Junk is just a stupid science-fiction horror film. The only reason I used the US military is that the audience could swallow the premise if it was them behind the experiment. The US military is so huge that it's easy to imagine them doing secret things such as this." He further stated, "There's nothing political about Junk. I was just taking advantage of the unwieldly large US forces."

== Production ==
=== Writing ===
Muroga is primarily known for his action and yakuza films, such as Score (1995) and the Gun Crazy series. Following the success of the 1998 film Ring, a friend of Muroga's suggested that he create a horror film. In the Fangoria interview, Muroga stated, "Since I make gun films with lots of shootouts, I felt that the zombie theme would best fit my style."

In preparation for writing the film's screenplay, Muroga rented zombie films from local video stores and watched them, including the first three films of George A. Romero's Dead series, as well as a number of Lucio Fulci films. He later stated that, "If it had a zombie in it, I watched it." Muroga also cited the 1996 film From Dusk till Dawn as an influence on Junk.

=== Casting ===
For the role of Saki, Muroga wanted an actress reminiscent of Sigourney Weaver as Ellen Ripley in the Alien films. While writing the film's script, Muroga decided he wanted Kaori Shimamura, a friend who had expressed an interest in working with him, to play Saki. Actress Miwa was cast as the intelligent zombie Kyoko, with Muroga stating: "I wanted someone who could be believable as both a loving wife and as the leader of all zombies. She had to express sadness and look sinister, all while pulling off the film's gore scenes. When I met [Miwa] during casting, I knew right away that she was the one I wanted, and would be key to the film's success. She had just the look I was after."

According to Muroga, the American characters depicted in the film were actual soldiers stationed on a base in Okinawa. Author Jim Harper wrote that the US soldiers in the film were locals from Thailand with no known prior acting experience.

=== Filming ===
Junk was shot in 2000, with filming taking place in Okinawa, Japan. Many of the gore effects were accomplished by using meat bought from a local market. Muroga said that he "was geared to make the most extreme zombie film I could", a philosophy that included asking the film's art director to increase the amount of blood used in scenes, and instructing actors to shove large amounts of meat in their mouths when needed. Occasionally, after hours spent handling and chewing meat, members of the cast and crew would have dinner, and "would look at the meat in our meals with blank expressions. [...] we simply could not bring ourselves to eat it."

Prior to shooting, Muroga was uncommitted to a specific title for the film. He decided to title the film Junk after seeing scrapyard trucks in Okinawa one day, one of which had the word "Junk" written on its side.

== Reception ==
Author Glenn Kay, in his review of Junk, complimented Osamu Ehara's performance, and despite referring to elements of its plot as being "unclear and incoherent", called the film "briskly paced, action packed and filled with 'pandemonium'". Kay also references the film's press kit, in which Muroga "openly admits to stealing shots—or, as he calls it, 'borrowing chaos'—so you'll see obvious nods to Aliens (1986), The Return of the Living Dead (1985), and the films of George A. Romero and Lucio Fulci."

Mark N. Mays wrote that Junk "combines disreputable genres to limited effect", concluding: "The George Romero ethos of working cheaply has proven to produce brilliance with a talented team; however, Muroga lacked such assistance." Author Jim Harper wrote that "Muroga keeps the pace moving faster than his zombies, but like his other films the end result is effectively a collection of clips from other movies (including his own), stitched together with occasional ingenuity." Writer and filmmaker Jovanka Vuckovic called Junk "a forgettable, incoherent jewel-heist flick that blatantly steals from Aliens, The Return of the Living Dead, Dawn of the Dead, Day of the Dead, Re-Animator, and more."

Beyond its cinematic influences, Junk has been characterized as an attempt to capitalize on the success of the video game series Resident Evil (known in Japan as Biohazard), which debuted in 1996.

== Home media ==
In the United States, Junk was released on DVD by Unearthed Films on 29 April 2003.
