= XX: Beautiful Beast =

- DVD cover
- Directed by: Toshiharu Ikeda
- Written by: Hiroshi Takahashi; Tamiya Takebashi
- Produced by: Norio Hattori; Makoto Okada
- Starring: Kaori Shimamura; Takanori Kikuchi; Hakuryu
- Cinematography: Seizo Sengen
- Music by: Tadao Takakuwa
- Distributed by: Toei Video (Japan)
- Release date: September 8, 1995 (Japan)
- Running time: 85 minutes
- Country: Japan
- Language: Japanese

XX: Beautiful Beast (Japanese: XX 美しき獣, Hepburn: XX: Utsukushiki kemono) is a 1995 Japanese film directed by Toshiharu Ikeda. The film was licensed in the US by Central Park Media and released on DVD and VHS under their Asia Pulp Cinema label.

== Cast ==
- Kaori Shimamura as Ran/"Black Orchid"
- Takanori Kikuchi as Yaguchi
- Hakuryu as Ho
- Dan Li
- Takeshi Yamato as Yoichi Fujinami
- Yuko Katagiri

=== English voice cast ===
The English dub was produced by Mercury Productions in New York City.

- Mary Ann Towne as Ran/Black Orchid
- Mark Percy as Yoichi Fujinami
- Scottie Ray as Yaguchi
- Tristan Goddard as Ho
- Hans Briekface as Shui
- Jeff Gimble as Li
- Eric Stuart as Takaki
- Ted Lewis as Ishizuka
- Suzy Prue as Mei Fan
- Bill Renie as Sakaki
- Pink Champagne as Chun Li
- Jody Lee

== See also ==
- Naked Killer
