= Kaori Shimamura =

Japanese nude model, gravure idol, tarento, and actress

- Born: January 27, 1971 (age 54); San'yō-Onoda, Yamaguchi, Japan
- Occupation: Actress

Kaori Shimamura (嶋村 かおり, Shimamura Kaori; born Kaori Matsumoto January 27, 1971, in Yamaguchi Prefecture) is a Japanese nude model, gravure idol, tarento and actress. Shimamura applied to the Guinness Book of Records for recognition of her twenty photobooks.

== Partial filmography ==
- Natural Woman (1994) - Saki
- Ike! Inachū takkyū-bu (TV series) - Rie Hōjō
- XX: Beautiful Beast (1995) - Ran/Black Orchid
- 監禁列島 美しき女豹 (1995) (video) - Sen
- リップステック 堕ちていく女 (1996) (video)
- Moon Angel (爆走！ ムーンエンジェル －北へ 1996) - Nema Natsuko
- Legend of the Devil (1996) - Kazunoshin Asahina
- Rose: Predator Leopardess (Rose 殺戮の女豹 1996) (video)
- 仁義8 内部抗争激化 (1996) (video)
- Sexy Cop 348 新・女刑事サシバ (1996) (video)
- 修羅之介斬魔剣 妖魔伝説 キングレコード=東北新社 (1996)
- XX しなやかな美獣 (1997) (video)
- Kill (1997) (video)
- 極道三国志 (1997) Knack
- W・Heat (1998) (video)
- 監禁遊戯 ダブルフェイク (1998) (video)
- Junk: Shiryō-gari (2000)
- 裏切りの晩歌 (2002)
- Gun Crazy 2: Beyond the Law (2002)
