= Seijuu Sentai Gingaman =

Japanese tokusatsu television series

- Title card
- Genre: Action-fantasy; Tokusatsu; Superhero fiction
- Created by: Toei Company
- Developed by: Yasuko Kobayashi
- Directed by: Ryuta Tasaki
- Starring: Kazuki Maehara; Koji Sueyoshi; Shōei; Nobuaki Takahashi; Juri Miyazawa; Teruaki Ogawa; Shogo Hayakawa; Yoshihiko Takamoku; Kei Mizutani
- Narrated by: Norio Wakamoto
- Opening theme: "Seijuu Sentai Gingaman" by Ryu Kisami
- Ending theme: "Hadashi no Kokoro de" by Ryu Kisami
- Composer: Toshihiko Sahashi
- Country of origin: Japan
- Original language: Japanese
- No. of episodes: 50 (list of episodes)

Production
- Producers: Kenji Ōta (TV Asahi); Shigenori Takatera (Toei); Kōichi Yada (Toei Agency)
- Production location: Tokyo, Japan (Greater Tokyo Area)
- Cinematography: Masao Inokuma; Shingo Ōsawa
- Editors: Chieko Hamasaki; Hiroshi Sunaga
- Running time: approx. 25 minutes
- Production companies: TV Asahi; Toei Agency; Toei Company

Original release
- Network: ANN (TV Asahi)
- Release: February 22, 1998 – February 14, 1999

Related
- Denji Sentai Megaranger; Kyuukyuu Sentai GoGoFive

Seijuu Sentai Gingaman (星獣戦隊ギンガマン, Seijū Sentai Gingaman; Star Beast Squadron Gingaman) is a Japanese tokusatsu television series. It is Toei's 22nd entry of the Super Sentai metaseries. The series aired from February 22, 1998, to February 14, 1999, replacing Denji Sentai Megaranger, and was replaced by Kyuukyuu Sentai GoGoFive. Its footage was used in Power Rangers Lost Galaxy. The lead screenwriter for the series is Yasuko Kobayashi. Toei given the name for international distribution is Gingaman.

At the 2017 San Diego Comic-Con, Shout! Factory announced that they would be releasing Seijuu Sentai Gingaman in Japanese with English subtitles on DVD. It was released on January 30, 2018. This is the seventh Super Sentai series released on Region 1 DVD in North America. In July 2018, Shout! made the series available on-demand on their website.

== Plot ==
Three thousand years ago, the Space Pirates Balban invaded Earth. The Starbeasts and the first Gingamen, warriors of the Ginga Forest, fought them with a mystical power known as Earth and eventually imprisoned them. The Ginga people later cloaked their forest within marked boundaries and passed on the duty of the Ginga warriors through generations.

In the present day, Hyuuga, Hayate, Gouki, Hikaru and Saya are chosen as the 133rd warriors of the Starbeast Swords. Ryouma is very happy that his elder brother Hyuuga succeeds to the title. When Orghi holds the succession ceremony of the Starbeast Swords, an earthquake breaks the seal on the Balban.

Orghi orders the 133rd warriors to get the Ginga Braces hidden in Roaring Mountain. However, the Balban attacks them to prevent the birth of the new Gingamen. During the battle, Hyuuga is swallowed into a crack in the ground created by the Balban's leader Captain Zahab. Enraged, Ryouma activates his hidden Earth Power and awakens the Ginga Braces. The Gingamen fight together with the Starbeasts against the Balban, who desire to revive the Demon Beast Daitanix, on whose corpse they built their castle.

== Characters ==
=== Gingamen ===
The Gingamen transformed. From left to right: Gouki, Saya, Ryouma, Hayate, and Hikaru.

The eponymous Gingamen are descendants of the original Gingamen from the Ginga Forest who use a fighting style originating from 3,000 years ago and are chosen at a ceremony to become the current Gingamen. Before battle, the team announces their arrival by saying, "We pierce through the galaxy with legendary blades! Seijuu Sentai Gingaman!" (銀河を貫く伝説の刃! 星獣戦隊ギンガマン！, Ginga o tsuranuku densetsu no yaiba! Seijū Sentai Gingaman!).

Later in the series, with the Lights of Ginga (ギンガの光, Ginga no Hikari), the Gingamen can assume Super Armor Shine (超装光, Chōsōkō) forms.

==== Ryouma ====
Fire Warrior Ryouma (火の戦士リョウマ, Hi no Senshi Ryōma) is a 22-year-old who becomes Ginga Red (ギンガレッド, Ginga Reddo) to fulfill his older brother Hyuuga's last wish. He is bright, optimistic, and hardworking.

With his Earth Power being fire, Ryouma can perform the Mane of Fire (炎のたてがみ, Honō no Tategami) elemental technique and the Flame Flash (炎一閃, Honō Issen) (with the Starbeast Sword) and Two Swords Flash (used with Kiba Cutter). In civilian form, he wields a boomerang.

==== Hayate ====
Wind Warrior Hayate (風の戦士ハヤテ, Kaze no Senshi Hayate) is a 22-year-old who fights as Ginga Green (ギンガグリーン, Ginga Gurīn). He is cool and quick-witted. He is an expert flute player and is the second-in-command. He has a weakness for tomatoes, but this is resolved, and honey. He is engaged to Miharu (ミハル) and always carries the flute and amulet she gave him before leaving the Ginga Forest.

With his Earth Power being wind, Hayate can perform the Fluttering of a Storm (嵐のはばたき, Arashi no Habataki) elemental technique, the Hurricane Gust (疾風一陣, Shippū Ichijin) (with the Starbeast Sword), and the Two Swords Gust (with the Kiba Cutter). As a Wind Warrior, he has the power to eliminate evil sounds via his flute, which he can also use as a pea-shooter in civilian form. He is rivals with Shellinda after she destroys his flute, and has a sword fight with her on the day he and Miharu would have been married. He makes a new flute with similar materials on Moon Mountain. After the final battle, Hayate is reunited with Miharu.

==== Gouki ====
Water Warrior Gouki (水の戦士ゴウキ, Mizu no Senshi Gōki) is a 22-year-old who fights as Ginga Blue (ギンガブルー, Ginga Burū). He is strong, shy, and slightly nervous as well as a lover of forests and wildlife. He is good at cooking. In the show, he believes this aspect of his personality would not let him be a good Gingaman, but at the end, he manages to win the love of Suzuko Miyasawa.

With his Earth Power being water, Gouki can perform the Pulse of the Stream (流水の鼓動, Ryūsui no Kodō) elemental technique and the Rapids Strike (激流一刀, Gekiryū Ittō) (used with the Starbeast Sword). In civilian form, he wields a whip. In Gaoranger vs. Super Sentai, Gouki lectures Soutarou Ushigome (Gao Black) on the many strong warriors of the Super Sentai franchise. He later offers his assistance in the fight against Rakushassa alongside the other Dream Sentai warriors.

==== Hikaru ====
Thunder Warrior Hikaru (雷の戦士ヒカル, Kaminari no Senshi Hikaru) is a 17-year-old who fights as Ginga Yellow (ギンガイエロー, Ginga Ierō). Although he is portrayed as being childish at times, he dislikes for others to treat him like a kid. Hikaru is a gluttonous prankster and his favorite food is Mister Donut's donuts. It is revealed he has been orphaned since childhood following his parents' death. After the appearance of Biznella, they often fight each other.

With his Earth Power being thunder, Hikaru can perform the Howl of Lightning (雷の雄叫び, Inazuma no Otakebi) elemental technique, the Ancestor Burst, the Thunder Sweep (雷一掃, Ikazuchi Issō) (with the Starbeast Sword), and the Severe Burn Lava (with the Kiba Cutter). In civilian form, he wields a shotgun.

==== Saya ====
Flower Warrior Saya (花の戦士サヤ, Hana no Senshi Saya) is a 17-year-old who fights as Ginga Pink (ギンガピンク, Ginga Pinku). Her admiration for Hyuuga gives her the courage to fight. She is always playing and competing with Hikaru, and loves climbing trees. Saya is strong, but also introverted and very popular with shopping districts residents. She holds a deep affection and care for Ryouma.

With her Earth Power being flowers, Saya can perform the Claws of Petals (花びらのツメ, Hanabira no Tsume) and the Flower Heart (花一心, Hana Isshin) (with the Starbeast Sword). In civilian form, she wields a slingshot.

=== Black Knight ===
Black Knight (黒騎士, Kuro Kishi) is a moniker utilized by its original user and his successor.

==== Bull Black ====
Bull Black (ブルブラック, Buru Burakku; 17–25)

==== Hyuuga ====
Hyuuga (ヒュウガ, Hyūga; 1–2, 25–50) is Ryouma's 27-year-old brother who was originally chosen to become the 133rd Ginga Red, but fell into a crack in the ground caused by Zahab. He is saved by Bull Black, who possesses Hyuuga's body for a while before discarding him. Soon after, Hyuuga is given the power to become the new Black Knight. When Gou Taurus is wounded during the battle against Evil Empress Iliess, he is captured by Bucrates who blackmails Hyuuga into working for him so he could sever his connection to the Earth to wield the cursed Knight Axe, the only thing that can shatter Zahab's Star Soul Jewel. Hyuuga agrees to give up his Earth Power in hopes of using the Knight Axe to kill Zahab. Hyuuga regains his Earth Power in the finale after the Knight Axe is destroyed and fights as the Black Knight alongside the Gingaman to finally kill Zahab.

With his Earth Power also being fire, Hyuuga can perform the Mane of Fire and the Black Chop (黒の一撃, Kuro no Ichigeki) (with the Bull Riot).

=== Starbeasts ===
The Starbeasts (星獣, Seijū) are sentient beings, originally from different planets (Galeon, Galcon, Garilla, Gaverick, Gat, Taurus, Rhinos, Phoenix, and Bitus). They help the Gingaman. The Gingaman's Earth Power increases when man and beast combine. When the Gingaman channel the energy of the Starbeasts' home planet through their Kiba Swords the first five Starbeasts are able to transform into Silver Starbeasts (銀星獣, Ginseijū) by the command "Great Rebirth, Silver Starbeasts!" (大転生銀星獣, Daitensei Ginseijū).

- Starbeast Ginga Leon (星獣ギンガレオン, Seijū Ginga Reon): The lion-like beast of flame and Ginga Red's partner. Its attack is Strong Flame. It appears whenever Ginga Red calls out "Ginga Leon!". A native of the field planet Galeon, it gives Yuuta its planet stone as a sign of their friendship. It later gains the ability to become Silver Starbeast Ginga Leon (銀星獣ギンガレオン, Ginseijū Ginga Reon), with an attack called Silver Flame. It helps out in Gaoranger vs. Super Sentai.
- Starbeast Gingalcon (星獣ギンガルコン, Seijū Gingarukon): The falcon/dragon-like beast of wind and Ginga Green's partner. Its attack is Roaring Cyclone. It appears whenever Ginga Green calls out "Gingalcon!". It is a native of the wind planet Galcon. It later gains the ability to become Silver Starbeast Gingalcon (銀星獣ギンガルコン, Ginseijū Gingarukon), with an attack called Silver Cyclone.
- Starbeast Gingarilla (星獣ギンガリラ, Seijū Gingarira): The gorilla-like beast of water and Ginga Blue's partner. Its attack is Mighty Strength. It appears whenever Ginga Blue calls out "Gingarilla!". It is native to the hidden forest planet Garilla. It gains the ability to become Silver Starbeast Gingarilla (銀星獣ギンガリラ, Ginseijū Gingarira), with an attack called Silver Blizzard. The toy version stores the GingaiOh fists in its feet.
- Starbeast Ginga Verick (星獣ギンガベリック, Seijū Ginga Berikku): The wolf-like beast of thunder and Ginga Yellow's partner. Its attack is Strong Electric Shock. It appears whenever Ginga Yellow calls out "Ginga Verick!". It is a native of the forest planet Gaverick. It later gains the ability to become Silver Starbeast Ginga Verick (銀星獣ギンガベリック, Ginseijū Gingaberikku), with an attack called Silver Flash (used with Gingat).
- Starbeast Gingat (星獣ギンガット, Seijū Gingatto): The wildcat-like beast of flowers and Ginga Pink's partner. Her attack is Flower Bullet. She appears whenever Ginga Pink calls out "Gingat!". She is a native of the sand planet Gat and loves sweet-tasting things. She later gains the ability to become Silver Starbeast Gingat (銀星獣ギンガット, Ginseijū Gingatto), with an attack called Silver Flash (used with Ginga Verick).
- Heavy Starbeast Gou Taurus (重星獣ゴウタウラス, Jūseijū Gō Taurasu): The Black Knight's bull-like partner who appears when they call out "Gou Taurus!". It is a native of the dead planet Taurus. It transforms the Black Knight into the giant Heavy Knight Bull Black (重騎士ブルブラック, Jū Kishi Buru Burakku), who dual wields the twin Bull Sword (ブルソード, Buru Sōdo) lances and can perform the Cross Fire Slash (クロスファイヤー斬, Kurosu Faiyā Kiri) attack. It forms a bodysuit for the Heavy Knight when forming Bull Taurus.
- Steel Starbeast Giga Rhinos (鋼星獣ギガライノス, Kōseijū Giga Rainosu): A red-armored robot, formerly the humanoid rhinoceros-like beast Starbeast Ginga Rhinos (星獣ギンガライノス, Seijū Ginga Rainosu), whose body can break into five Giga Wheels (ギガホイール, Giga Hoīru), only to reform as one again through its Beast-Land Fusion (獣陸合体, Jūriku Gattai). It is a native of the dead planet Rhinos, which was attacked by the Space Pirates Balban. Rhinos was found in a near-death state by Dark Merchant Biznella who rebuilt it into its current form. It uses its powerful Gigantis Buster (ギガンティスバスター, Gigantisu Basutā) cannon in battle. Giga Rhinos was later destroyed along with Giga Phoenix in battle with Ghelmadix.
- Steel Starbeast Giga Phoenix (鋼星獣ギガフェニックス, Kōseijū Giga Fenikkusu): A blue-armored robot, formerly the phoenix-like beast Starbeast Ginga Phoenix (星獣ギンガフェニックス, Seijū Ginga Fenikkusu), whose body can break into five Giga Wings (ギガウイング, Giga Uingu), only to reform as one again through its Beast-Sky Fusion (獣空合体, Jūkū Gattai). It is a native of the dead planet Phoenix, which was attacked by the Space Pirates Balban. Giga Phoenix was found in a near-death state by Dark Merchant Biznella who rebuilt it into its current form. With its weapon, the Giganic Boomerang (ギガニックブーメラン, Giganikku Būmeran), it aids the Gingamen in many battles. It combines with Rhinos for an energy cyclone attack. Giga Phoenix is known to have a calm edge aesthetic, which makes him a good choice to battle Majins with overwhelming great strength. Giga Phoenix was later destroyed along with Giga Rhinos in battle with Ghelmadix.
- Giant Starbeast Beast Giga Bitus (巨大鋼星獣ギガバイタス, Kyodai Kōseijū Giga Baitasu): A silver mother ship, formerly the shark-like beast Starbeast Ginga Bitus (星獣ギンガバイタス, Seijū Ginga Baitasu), for his fellow Steel Starbeasts. It is a native of the dead planet Bitus, which was attacked by the Space Pirates Balban. Bitus was found in a near-death state by Dark Merchant Biznella, who rebuilt it into its current form. Bitus transforms from Cruiser Mode (クルーザーモード, Kurūzā Mōdo) to Scramble Mode (スクランブルスモード, Sukuranburu Mōdo), is equipped with the Bitus Cannon (バイタスキャノン, Baitasu Kyanon), and usually chooses to send either Giga Rhinos for his sharp concentration or Giga Phoenix for his calm edge aesthetic whenever the Gingamen and their Starbeasts need their help.

=== Allies ===
==== Elder Orghi ====
Elder Orghi (長老オーギ, Chōrō Ōgi) is the leader of the Ginga people. When the Ginga Forest is attacked by Shellinda to use its energy to revive Daitanix, Orghi casts a petrification spell on himself and everything in the forest to prevent her from absorbing its energy, submerging it into the lake. Before being fully petrified, Orghi leaves a pendant with a seed to the Gingamen. In the finale after Zahab's death, the Ginga Forest resurfaces and Orghi as well as the rest of the Ginga people are restored.

==== Moak ====
Wisdom Tree Moak (知恵の樹モーク, Chie no Ki Mōku) is Orghi's final gift to the Gingamen before he is turned to stone and is located outside the Silver Star Equestrian Club. Moak senses all the events that happen near any forest or wood such as Barban's presence. He gives new weapons to the Gingamen. He has knowledge of all Ginga legends. Near the finale, he sacrifices himself to prevent the birth of the Earth Beast and remove the traces of the Extreme Growth Extract which is affecting the Earth and the Gingamen's Earth Power, but he leaves behind a seed. After the Ginga Forest is restored in the finale, Moak is revived when Orghi plants his seed in the Ginga Forest.

==== Bokku ====
Fairy Bokku (妖精ボック, Yōsei Bokku) is a fairy with an acorn-shaped helmet who is Moak's companion.

==== Haruhiko Aoyama ====
Haruhiko Aoyama (青山 晴彦, Aoyama Haruhiko) is a writer of children's stories who believes in the existence of the legendary Ginga Forest. He offers the Gingaman his ranch for them to live in after their forest is petrified and records their adventures.

==== Yuuta Aoyama ====
Yuuta Aoyama (青山 勇太, Aoyama Yūta) is Haruhiko's 9-year-old son. He does not believe the legend until he witnesses the birth of the 133rd Gingamen. Yuuta is given GingaLeon's planet stone, which he uses to stop the Balban from trying to collect the energy the Gingamen was using to revive the Starbeasts.

==== Suzuko Mizusawa ====
Suzuko Mizusawa (水澤 鈴子, Mizusawa Suzuko) is Yuuta's teacher at Wakatake Elementary School. Mizusawa is Gouki's secret love. Gouki had a rivalry with Shunsuke Kishimoto (岸本 俊介), a teacher from another school, for Suzuko's affections. In the end, Suzuko chooses Gouki and proves it by showing him the bracelet Gouki had made for her.

==== Misaki Hoshino ====
Misaki Hoshino (星野 美咲, Hoshino Misaki) is an acting idol who resembles Saya. She helps Saya against the Balban.

=== Space Pirates Balban ===
The Space Pirates Balban (宇宙海賊バルバン, Uchū Kaizoku Baruban) are a group of space pirates who have destroyed many planets along the Milky Way. Their headquarters, the Rowdy Invincible Castle (荒くれ無敵城, Arakure Mutekijō), is mounted on the back of Daitanix. They once tried to invade Earth 3,000 years ago, but the first generation of Gingamen and the Starbeasts sealed them at the bottom of the sea. In the present day, an earthquake breaks the seal and releases the Balban, who plan to reawaken Daitanix. Its four great armies plot various strategies to achieve it.

- Captain Zahab (ゼイハブ船長, Zeihabu-senchō): (Note: Zahab's name is from the fictional character Captain Ahab (アハブ船長, Ahabu-senchō).) The pirate ship-themed leader of the Space Pirates Balban. Zahab gains immortality thanks to a Star Soul Jewel created by Daitanix, using the monster to gather a crew by offering them long life. Zahab's left hand is missing, as a result of the battle sustained with the first generation Gingaman three thousand years earlier. He has replaced it with a cannon integrated hook. In the final battle, he uses the castle to take control of the Earth Demon Beast and Zahab is forced to flee along with his castle before it is destroyed by Bull Taurus. After losing the Earth Beast, Zahab gave his castle to Gregory, only to be killed by the Gingamen in the Galaxy Lights armor in Seijuu Sentai Gingaman vs. Megaranger.
- Captain Gregory (グレゴリ艦長, Guregori-kanchō): (Note: Gregory's name is from the actor Gregory Peck who portrayed Captain Ahab in the 1956 Moby Dick movie.) A battlecruiser-themed old friend of Zahab's who came to Earth to revive the Space Pirates Balban, with the aid of Hizumina, Dr. Hinelar's second "daughter". He had his own personal Majin Ghelmadix which was originally a second Daitanix. According to Moku, Gregory was sealed by the Starbeasts long before the Balban, feared as much as they were, all on his own. He could make himself grow without the aid of an enchanted liquid. Gregory is killed by Galaxy Mega & Super Armor Shine GingaiOh. Voiced by Seizō Katō (加藤 精三, Katō Seizō).
- Steerwoman Shellinda (操舵士シェリンダ, Sōdashi Sherinda): (Note: Shellinda's name is a combination of "shell" (シェル, sheru) and the Japanese word for "helm" (操舵輪, sōdarin), as well as a combination of "shell" and the English female name "Linda" (リンダ, Rinda).) The cruel and selfish second-in-command and the navigator of the Balban. A warrior with a sword and seashell-themed armor, Shellinda had romantic feelings for Budoh, though she never forgave him for saving her life sometime in the past. Shellinda is eventually killed by the Gingaman in the Galaxy Lights armor in Seijuu Sentai Gingaman vs. Megaranger.
- Barreled Scholar Bucrates (樽学者ブクラテス, Taru Gakusha Bukuratesu): (Note: Bucrates's name is a combination of "book" (ブック, bukku) and "Socrates" (ソクラテス, Sokuratesu).) A stout little scholar with a barrel-armored body, Bucrates lacks battle skills, though he makes up for it with his extensive knowledge. He is called "Mentor" (先生, Sensei) by Zahab and is the one who gave Zahab an immortal body. Before Sambash was named acting general, Bucrates supported his niece Illiess in taking on the position from the start. While Budoh was acting general, Bucrates felt humiliated by the general after his numerous attempts to upstage Budoh. He proceeds to conspire with Iliess to frame Budou so she can become acting general. Though it seemed they got away with it, it turned out Zahab knew of the plot yet allowed Bucrates to remain until Illiess's death. Attempting to resurrect Illiess in secret, Bucrates is mortally wounded by Zahab and wrapped in chains as he is sent underwater. However, his newfound hatred for Zahab allowed Bucrates to survive the ocean pressure while changing into a new form called Barreled Scholar of Revenge Bucrates (復讐の樽学者ブクラテス, Fukushū no Taru Gakusha Bukuratesu). Escaping his binds, Bucrates vows revenge on the Balban, capturing Gou Taurus to get Hyuuga's assistance. Bucrates later let Gou Taurus out temporarily to have Hyuuga aid the Gingamen against Daitanix, before drawing them both back when the battle was over. However, Bucrates is mortally wounded by Shellinda for his betrayal before he can see his revenge fulfilled and subsequently commits suicide to give Hyuuga a chance to escape with Gou Taurus.
- Dark Merchant Biznella (闇商人ビズネラ, Yami Shōnin Bizunera): (Note: Biznella's name is a pun on the word "business" (ビズネス, bizunesu).) A pierrot-themed black market merchant. He captured the near-death Starbeasts GingaRhinos, GingaPhoenix, and GingaBitus and turned them into cyborgs, before selling them to the Balban for a payment of five boys of gold coins. After his merchandise fails, Biznella is recruited into Balban as a consultant under the service of Battobas, who he had been acquainted with previously. During one of their attempts to find the Demon Earth Beast, Biznella is thrown into the Extreme Growth Extract by accident and mutates into Majin Biznella (魔人ビズネラ, Majin Bizunera), who overpowers the Gingamen until they defeat him with their upgraded Beast Attack Rods. He is then betrayed and enlarged by Battobas, and is killed by GigaRhinos, GigaPhoenix, and Super Armor Shine GingaiOh.

==== The Balban Army Generals ====
Four of the strongest Majins, they each lead one of Zahab's four armies. Due to quarrels in the past that caused them to be sealed away, Zahab has only one General-in-command form a plan at a time.

- Gun Boss Sambash (銃頭サンバッシュ, Jūtō Sanbasshu): (Note: Sambash's name is a combination of the Japanese word for "pier" (桟橋, sanbashi) and of bakyun-bakyun (バキュンバキュン), the Japanese onomatopoeia word for the random shooting of a gun.) A hot-headed biker/gunslinger who carries a pistol and rides a motorcycle with cannons. His Majin are based on invertebrae. 3,000 years ago, Bull Black had come to Earth to hide the Galaxy Lights and Sambash cornered him to learn where they were hidden. Bull Black gave him the key of an empty chest and a fake location in Cape Kagerou, with Sambash keeping this information from Zahab. Being the first general chosen to revive it, Sambash attempts to find ways of providing energy for Daitanix to revive. Unable to open the entrance without an Earth user, Sambash has Gurinjii assume Hyuga's form to trick Ryouma into fetching it for him. As Gurinjii is destroyed by GingaiOh, Sambash opens the box to use the Lights of Ginga on himself to even the odds. However, finding it empty and with nothing to lose, Sambash climbs onto his bike to run over Ginga Red. In the process, after being hit by Ginga Red's attack, Sambash drives off a cliff as his motorcycle explodes, destroying both itself and him. He is later resurrected by Gregory, only to be killed once again by the Gingamen in the Galaxy Lights armor in Seijuu Sentai Gingaman vs. Megaranger.
- Sword General Budoh (剣将ブドー, Kenshō Budō): (Note: Budoh's name is from the Japanese words for "wharf" (埠頭, futō) and Budō (武道).) A calm manta ray-themed samurai who became the second Barban General-in-command chosen. Budoh has a mostly white and blue outfit with manta ray-like wings as a partial cape bearing his army's emblem. He possesses the Girasame sword, with which he can perform his "Girasame Cruel Sword" attack. Budoh has a strong sense of honor and loyalty that even Zahab recognized despite being unpredictable. His Majin are traditional Japanese Samurai culture and sea creature based. Budoh was always well-mannered and thanked his fallen Majin, who called him "My Grand General". He takes over the search for the Galaxy Light to revive Daitanix after Sambash dies, using a scroll of potential hosts that might contain the Light. With only one entry left, with his life endangered, Budoh sends his most powerful servant, Dotoumusha, to retrieve the Galaxy Light with success. However, Budoh is set up by Bucrates and Iliess to be made as a treasonous cur wanting the Light for himself. Placed in the brig, unable to perform Seppuku for an act he never even did, Budoh escapes to clear his name and kill the Gingamen to reclaim the Galaxy Light. But once learning the truth of Iliess framing him, seeing that nothing would ever clear his name, Budoh kills Medoumedou before arriving to his ninjas' aid to fight Juusoukou Ginga Red to the death. After being mortally wounded by Juusoukou Ginga Red's Juukasen, attempting to resist his injuries, Budoh dies in a blaze of glory with Girasame landing near the riverbed. In Seijuu Sentai Gingaman vs. Megaranger, he is revived and killed once again by the Gingaman in the Galaxy Lights armor.
- Spectral Empress Illiess (妖帝イリエス, Yōtei Iriesu): (Note: Illiess's name is a combination of the Japanese word for "inlet" (入り江, irie) and "Osiris" (オシリス, Oshirisu).) An Egyptian-themed sorceress and the niece of Bucrates who is spiteful, ambitious, and motivated by her greed and demanding monetary compensation upon a successful plan. Her majin are based around entities from different cultural mythologies. Illiess is also immortal as she can resurrect herself no matter the number of times she is killed as long as her Soul Gem is unharmed. Having become impatient with waiting, Illiess conspires with her uncle Bucrates to depose Budoh so she can become the new active general. Having succeeded, Illiess intended to revive Daitanix through various forms of sorcery and mass sacrifices so she can obtain the riches Zahab offered for the monster's resurrection. However, after losing the Koseijuu, Illiess is given additional incentive to revive Daitanix when Zaihab decides to reduce her earnings for each day she fails her objective. After the death of her younger brother Desphias, Illiess is forced to take matters into her own hands. Erecting a tower in the city's plaza, Illiess conjures lizards to suck the blood of 9,999 people to revive Daitanix. When the Gingamen arrive, Illiess absorbs the souls of her fallen Majin to assume a powerful Chimera-like fighting form called Evil Empress Illiess (邪帝イリエス, Jatei Iriesu). Defeated by the Supershine Gingamen and Black Knight, Iliess refuses to stand down and uses her magic to enlarge herself. Illiess then overpowers Super Armor Shine GingaiOh and Bull Taurus before the Kouseiju's interference leads to her death by the Seijuu. Though Bucrates attempts to revive her, Iliess's soul gem is shattered by Batobas and used to preserve Daitanix from rotting.
- Destruction King Battobas (破王バットバス, Haō Battobasu): (Note: Battobas's name is a combination of the Japanese words for "quay" (波止場, hatoba) and "to strike" (ぶっ飛ばす, buttobasu).) A Viking-themed Roboton who is the strongest among the four generals and a weapons specialist as well. He is considered by Zahab to be "his right arm" which suggests a longer relationship between them than the rest of the generals. His Majin are based on weapons and machines. Revealing Daitanix's condition and using Iliess's soul to delay the rotting, Battobas is last general chosen to fight the Gingaman with the mission to gain enough energy to fully revive Daitanix, sometimes having Biznella plot the plan while he would provide the Majin and Yahtots. Battobas succeeded, but upon Daitanix's destruction, he is later sent to find the Earth Beast to mature and/or empower it fully with an Extreme Growth Extract. He succeeds, when he gave the Extreme Growth Extract to the monster in episode 49. He is killed by the Gingaman in the Galaxy Lights armor in Seijuu Sentai Gingaman vs. Megaranger.
- Pirate Soldier Yahtots (賊兵ヤートット, Zokuhei Yātotto): (Note: Yahtots's name is from "Enya Totto" (エンヤートット, En'yātotto), a Japanese fishermen's song chanted to coordinate the efforts of rowing the oars.) Balban's seamen-themed foot soldiers, orange with striped shorts and wielding sabers. When fighting, they would only say "Yahtot!" but can speak when talking to their superiors.

==== Majin ====
The Majin (魔人; Demon Men) are criminals and mercenaries who, drawn by the evil energy of Daitanix, are recruited by Balban. They are divided into four armies depending on their home galaxy and the strongest member of each is appointed General. These four armies tend to fight with each other, this being one of the reasons of their defeat against Gingaman 3,000 years earlier. Knowing this, Zahab decides that this time the plans would be executed by one army at a time, thus avoiding inner conflicts. When defeated, the Majin will draw a bottle (its design depends on the army the Majin belongs to) containing Balba-X (バルバエキス, Baruba Ekisu), a potion that enlarges them, but that also shortens their life, making Balba-X a last resort in battle. Many of them are revived and killed by the Megarangers & the Gingaman in Seijuu Sentai Gingaman vs. Megaranger.

===== Sambash Majin Gang =====
The Sambash Majin Gang (サンバッシュ魔人団, Sanbasshu Majin Dan) are invertebrate-based Majin that dress in leather like a biker gang. They're the first army to fight. Their primary objective is to find a way to revive Daitanix. Their Balba-X container is a liquor bottle and their symbol is a wing pin.

- Kolshizer (コルシザー, Korushizā) is a pistol-wielding scorpion Majin who played a part in destruction of the planet Taurus. Kolshizer is hired to find an energy source on Earth to awaken Daitanix, causing him to gather gasoline fuel from inside cars. Kolshizer and the Yartots destroy a lot of cars and caused a lot of damage while trying to accomplish this theft, before being stopped by the Gingaman. Kolshizer's attack lead to the debut of the Star Beasts, where he was killed by GingaLeon. Kolshizer is later revived and killed once again by the Megarangers in Seijuu Sentai Gingaman vs. Megaranger. Voiced by Takeji Yoshihara.
- Rigurou (リグロー, Rigurō) is a flea-like Majin with the ability to absorb heat who attempts to find a heat-based energy source for the Daitanix's awakening. He is killed by the GingaLeon's flaming breath after being weakened by the other Starbeasts. Voiced by Hidenari Ugaki.
- Dreddredder (ドレッドレッダー, Doreddōreddā) is a centipede-like Majin who is able to absorb electricity and wields an electrified whip. He attempts tried to awaken Daitanix via an electrical-based energy source, only to be killed by the GingaVerick and Gingalcon. Voiced by Takao Ishi.
- Bucter (バクター, Bakutā) is a waterbug-like Majin, Bucter is an expert at stealing and collecting weapons, obtaining the Kiba Blades from the 1st Gingamen 3,000 years earlier. Pucrates accidentally broke the Great Darkness Sword, a weapon thought to be able to revive Daitanix, via its energy, as it had rusted over many centuries. Bucter is then summoned to create a second Great Darkness Sword by gathering 555 weapons. However, Bucter is reluctant to give up the Seijuuken and the Kibas in Sambash's scheme. His reluctance results in the Gingaman taking back both weapon sets. Bucter is defeated at the hands of the Kibas before being killed by GingaLeon. He is revived by Gregory and killed once again by the Megarangers in Seijuu Sentai Gingaman vs. Megaranger. Voiced by Kōji Tobe.
- Tagredor (タグレドー, Taguredō) is a stag beetle-themed Majin who can convert anything he eats into poisonous gas. He attempts to turn Earth into a contaminated planet, like Zahab's home planet of Dera, hoping that the fumes would revive Daitanix. The Starbeasts sacrifice themselves to absorb the poison, neutralizing the Majin's power. After being driven off by the Gingamen, Tagredor is sent back to destroy them, now wielding a mallet, and being aided by his brother Torbador. However, the Starbeasts are revived, with Gingaioh killing Tagredor. Voiced by Kenichi Sakaguchi.
- Torbador (トルバドー, Torubadō) is Tagredor's older brother and a rhinoceros beetle-themed Majin who was present during the attack on Planet Taurus. He is able to fire beams from the gun-like tip of his horn. When the Starbeasts are briefly petrified, he and his brother are sent to destroy them to make an awakening potion for Daitanix out of their remains. However, the StarBeasts are revived, with Gingaioh killing Torbador. He is killed once again by the Megarangers, after being revived by Gregory in Seijuu Sentai Gingaman vs. Megaranger. Voiced by Takuro Kitagawa.
- Dolmar (ドルマー, Dorumā) is a pillbug-themed Majin with a durable shell who wields giant eating utensils as weapons. He is sent to find a good chef whose food samples could revive Daitanix. While running from the Gingamen, Dolmar runs into an old lady Hikaru befriended and later kidnaps her. However, Hikaru stops him as Ginga Yellow manages to defeat him. After enlarging, Dolmar's shell is shattered before he is killed by Gingaioh. Voiced by Takeshi Kuwabara.
- Mandiger (マンディガー, Mandigā) is a mantis-themed Majin who is originally armed with the High Speed Majin Swords (高速魔人剣 Kōsoku Majin Ken), which were used like dowsing rods, and was present during the attack on Planet Taurus. Mandigger is sent after a meteorite that contains the sealed power of Gingat. Forced to retreat from the Gingamen, Mandiger later receives a scythe and uses it to distract the male Gingamen while Sambash goes after the meteorite. As Gingagat regains her power, Mandigger is defeated by Ginga Red and killed by Gigaioh. He is killed once again by the Megarangers in Seijuu Sentai Gingaman vs. Megaranger. Voiced by Eiji Maruyama.
- Sutoijii (ストイジー, Sutoijī) is a cicada/vampire-themed Majin who can blast powerful sound waves from the speakers on his shoulders. He is sent to create a loud enough racket from the surrounding noise to awaken Diatanix. However, Hayate's flute playing negates the noise, before Ginga Red destroys the Majin's conducting rod. Returning with Sambash, and with a blade, Sutoiji resumes his concert, as he battles the Gingamen, until Hayate's new flute cancels the sound and his new weapon is also destroyed. After being defeated, Sutoiji enlarges and is killed by Gingaioh. Voiced by Hiroshi Otake.
- Neikaa (ネイカー, Neikā) is a hornet-themed Majin armed with a rapier. He uses Seismic Needles to create points to cause earthquakes the next day, in order to open the cave leading to the presumed resting place of the Galaxy Lights. When Ginga Blue arrives and defeats him, Neikar drinks Balba-X, as he battles Gingarilla, before Gingaioh kills him with the Galcon Bowgun. Voiced by Fumihiko Inoue.
- Gurinjii (グリンジー, Gurinjī) is a mole cricket-themed Majin who poses as Hyuuga to trick Ryouma into opening the cavern to the Ginga Lights box. After Ryouma obtains the box that the Lights are supposedly in, Hyuuga knocks Ryouma out and takes the box. Hyuuga returns to Sambash with the box and reveals his true form, only to be killed by Gingaioh. Voiced by Tōru Ōkawa.

===== Budoh Majin Mob =====
The Budoh Majin Mob (ブドー魔人衆, Budō Majin Shū) are marine creature-based Majin in feudal Japanese attire and masters of the Majin Arts. They begin activities after Sambash reveals the existence of the Galaxy Lights and their mission is to find them. After having been defeated by the Gingamen, the Budoh Majin draw the Balba-X and "pay their last service". Their Balba-X container is a hyoutan, a gourd-like container and their symbol is a diamond-shaped image of a sunrise.

- Komuhachi (虚無八, Komuhachi) is an octopus-like Komusō Majin who is master of the Majin Art: Phantom Dance (魔人寸法幻の舞 Majin Sunpō Maboroshi no Mai). After being unable to represent his master when Sambash was picked instead of him, Komuhachi is sent by Budoh to keep an eye on Sambash, during Sambash's final mission. After his master is selected to carry out Balban's mission, Komhachi use his shakuhachi to infect the trees with mold to force the Galaxy Lights out of them, putting Moak in danger, thus the Juugekibou weapons were revealed, when Moak used his power to infuse their power within five nuts, leading to their creation. He is killed by Gingaioh and again by Ginga Red in Seijuu Sentai Gingaman vs. Megaranger. Voiced by Toshihide Tsuchiya.
- Fudasoushou (札僧正, Fudasōshō) is a squid-like Kannushi Majin who Budoh sends to destroy cameras in hopes of finding the Galaxy Lights by tossing explosive talismans that would latch onto their targets. While attacking the shooting of Misaki Hoshino, he puts a cursed seal on Saya's leg, at one point, making her unable to fight him. However, with Misaki's help, Saya catches Fudasoushou off guard to destroy his talismans. After drinking Balba-X, upon being hit with the Beast Attack Cannons, Fudosoushou is killed by Gingaioh's Galcon Bowgun. Voiced by Hisnori Nemoto.
- Kemuemon (煙ェ門, Kemuemon) is a sea urchin-like ninja bandit Majin sent by Budoh, to find antiques and, with his pipe-like staff, smoke out the Galaxy Lights. He targets a 3,000-year-old Balban bomb, which ends up being swallowed by Hikaru by accident. Kemuemon pursues Ryouma and Hikaru, believing they are hiding the artifact. Once the bomb is destroyed, by the waters of the Cancellation Falls, Kemuemon is defeated by Ginga Red and Ginga Yellow and then killed by Gingaioh. Revived, Kemuemon is killed once again by the Megarangers, in the movie. Voiced by Hironori Miyata.
- Amehoshi (雨法師, Amehōshi) is a blowfish/biwa-player Majin, who uses his instrument as a multi-purpose weapon, as he looks for the Galaxy Lights. By conducting a ceremony, in which he summoned cursed storm clouds to soak the ground with a rain that absorbs life, and once the rains stopped, Amehoshi attempted to summon the Galaxy Lights, with his shamisen, while causing the ground to melt. He battles the Gingamen, when they intervene, and is defeated by them, with the Juugekiha attack. Drinking Barba X, Amehoshi is killed by Gingaioh. Voiced by Kaoru Shinoda.
- Kugutsudayuu (傀儡太夫, Kugutsudayū) is a starfish-like engineer Majin who wields a cog-like chakram. He is deployed by Budoh to use his explosive android puppets to infiltrate skyscrapers and self-destruct to destroy the buildings to force the Galaxy Lights out. When Yuta finds his base of operations, he leads Ryouma there while the others battle Budoh as they intercept the dolls. After the machine that creates his dolls is destroyed while being mortally wounded by Ginga Red, Kugutsudayuu sics his creations on Ryouma as he staggers to Budoh's side to beg for forgiveness before drinking Barba-X. He is killed by a combo attack by GingaVerick, Gingat, Gingarilla, and Gingalcon. Voiced by Takkou Ishimori.
- Kairikibou (壊力坊, Kairikibō) is a strong red and white Sōhei Majin with coral-like growths all over his body, using a spear as a weapon and able to fire a beam from his mouth. He is deployed by Budoh to find the most indestructible item that supposedly contains the Galaxy Lights, Kairikibou finds the "Oni Stone", an unbreakable artifact stone. Stealing the stone in midst of the Gingamen's fight with Bull Black, Kairikibou's attempt to smash the stone with a sledgehammer fails as he sends a challenge to the Gingamen meet him in Himokudari in hopes their Juugekibou can do the job. When he attempts to kill them for failing to meet his expectations, Bull Black arrives and engages the Majin in a duet that ends with the shattered Oni Stone empty. On the verge of death, Karikibou drinks the Balban-X to kill Bullblack, only to be stopped and destroyed by Gingaioh. He is killed again by the Megarangers in the movie after being revived. Voiced by Takashi Nagasako
- Yamimaru and Onimaru (鬼丸&闇丸, Yamimaru to Onimaru) are a green shark-like and a red hammerhead shark-like Majin ninja brothers. Onimaru is able to perform Majin Ninja Art Confusion Jutsu that has his victim see only enemies. Though Yamimaru and Oniimaru attempted to clear their master's name, they choose to follow their master in death by Super Armor Shine Gingaioh. The brothers are killed once again by Ginga Red in the crossover movie, after being revived by Gregory and the others. Voiced by Kazuhiro Oguro and Bunkō Ogata.
- The Budoh Four Shoguns (ブドー四将軍, Budō Yon Shōgun) are Budoh's best Majin who he enlists to help deal with Bull Black's return and find the Galaxy Lights which they do.
  - Sunabakutou (砂爆盗, Sunabakutō) is a scorpionfish-like bandit Majin, utilizing "Explosive Sand" from his pouch onto objects. He is one of the Majin who played a role in the death of Krantz. Sunabakutou is deployed by Budoh to destroy any sun-shaped statue that would hold the Galaxy Lights. While attacking the Museum of Modern Sculpture, Sunabakuto engages Bull Black with civilian casualties. When the statue fails to hold the Lights, he goes after another statue in the park. When Bull Black attacks, he holds the girl hostage to keep him and the Gingamen from attacking him. With the Gingamen managing to get the child from Sunabakuto, Bull Black defeats the Majin. After finding his target empty upon destroying it with his entire bag, Sunabakuto drinks Balban-X and overpowers Gingaioh. However, the sudden appearance of GouTaurus turns the tables as Sunabakuto is destroyed by Bull Taurus. Voiced by Maroshi Tamura.
  - Hyoudogasa (氷度笠, Hyōdogasa) is a jellyfish-like Kogarashi Monjirō-resembling swordsman Majin who is deployed by Budoh to put humans to sleep by throwing his extra Kasa and releasing thousands of ice stingers down onto them in his Dream Goal (夢ゴール Yume Gōru) ability in hopes that the Lights of Ginga manifest. Also attacks with his Merciless Drawing Slash (抜刀無残斬り Battō Muzan Giri). Though he placed the Gingamen under his spell, not only Ryouma is unaffected due to his flame ability but the animals. Having until sunset to wake everyone up, Ryouma engages Hyoudogasa, who was duped by Illness's illusion, on horse-back before defeating him in a duel with unexpected help from Bull Black. After drinking Balba-X, Hyoudogasa battles Gingaleon and the Heavy-Knight before being killed by Bull Taurus. Voiced by Shigenori Sōya.
  - Houretsudou (砲烈道, Hōretsudō) is a crab-like Kabuki Majin who possesses a staff that allows him to use the Majin Explosion (魔人炸裂弾 Majin Sakuretsudan) attack with the machine gun end and the Majin Intense Burst (魔人強烈砲 Majin Kyōretsuhō) attack with the cannon end. Houretsudou is deployed by Budoh to target tomatoes, believing that one of them held the Galaxy Lights. Though he injured Ginga Green, Houretsudou is disarmed after Hayate overcame his tomato-phobia to fully heal. After being defeated by the Gingamen, Houretsudou drinks Balba-X before being destroyed by Gingaioh. Voiced by Mitsuaki Hoshino.
  - Dotoumusha (怒涛武者, Dotōmusha) is the most powerful of Budoh's Majin, Dotoumusha is a red lobster-like samurai in indestructible samurai armor whose trademark attack is Jashin Edge Beheading (邪心両斬 Jashin Ryōzan). As this was his master's final chance, Dotoumusha is deployed by Budoh to find a Holy Fountain under the city and siphon the light from it. However, casting the suffocating Wide Cast Force Field to keep the Gingamen and Bull Black from interfering, Dotomusha did not expect Hikaru and Saya's meddling as they find the barrier's weak point and destroy it. Could attack with his "Evil Edge Slash". Despite the setback, Dotomusha succeeded in obtaining the Lights of Ginga in an urn and making has way to Daitanix while fighting off Bull Black. However, Medoumedou, in the guise of Budoh, tricks Dotoumusha into using the Lights of Ginga on himself to test the power on the Gingamen. With his new power, enough to cause a massive forest fire with his "Luminous Ball" and "Great Evil Flame Slash" attacks. Dotomusha overpowers the enraged Gingamen before Medoumedou makes her move, giving him a cursed bracelet that would absorb all of his powers. But Bullblack and cause the Light of Ginga to leave him and enter the Gingamen as they use their new Jusoukou forms to destroy Dotomusha before he can drink his Balba-X. Voiced by Ryūzaburō Ōtomo.

===== Iliess Majin Tribe =====
The Iliess Majin Tribe (イリエス魔人族, Iriesu Majin Zoku) are the phantom beast Majin based on different entities from various mythologies. They enter into action after Iliess sets up Budoh as a tratior, utilizing different ways of reviving Daitanix through sorcery involving mass sacrifices. Their Balba-X container was a boot-like vial and their symbol is an Egyptian-looking eye.

- Medoumedou (メドウメドウ, Medōmedō) is a shapeshifting Gorgon-themed Majin armed with a whip who represented her mother Iliess when Zaihab was selecting his leading general. When Iliess learns that Budoh succeeded with Dotoumusha obtaining the Galaxy Lights, Medoumedou assumed Budoh's form to trick the Dotomusha into using the Galaxy Lights while giving him a beaded snake bracelet to siphon the Lights from him once Budoh is charged with treason. When Iliess is made acting general, Medoumedou is set after Budoh, revealing her role in his downfall before he killed her. Voiced by Narumi Tsunoda
- Wangawanga (ワンガワンガ, Wangawanga) is a tiki-masked witch doctor-themed Majin whose Spear of Hatred requires hate-filled souls. Finding Bull Black's soul most suitable, Wangawanga is kept at bay by the Gingamen before they use their Juusoukou forms to defeat him. After drinking his Barba-X, Wangawanga is destroyed by Super Armor Shine Gingaioh as his Spear of Hatred fell into Mt. Kongou, with Bull Black sacrificing himself to contain the energy. Wangawanga is one of the five Majin revived by Illiess to keep the Gingaman from reaching a tower, which was supplying power to Daitanix. He holds off Hayate, but disappears after Ryouma destroys Iliess' tower. He is later killed once again by the Megarangers in Seijuu Sentai Gingaman vs. Megaranger. Voiced by Mahito Tsujimura.
- Geltgelt (ゲルトゲルト, Gerutogeruto) is a knight-armored gashadokuro Majin whose mirror shield to traps people in mirrors with his Grudge Seal spell. He is sent by Iliess to gather 39 mirrors, four holding Hayate, Gouki, hikaru, and Saya, as offerings for a ritual to break the seal on Daidanix. When Ryouma and Hyuuga come to their aid, Geltgelt brought three Grim Reaper-like dolls to life to keep them at bay. Destroying Geltgelt's shield with a double Fire Mane, freeing everyone in the process, the Gingamen defeat Geltgelt as he drinks Barba-X to overpower Super Armor Shine Gingaioh, trapping him in his Mirror Bind. However, when Hyuuga inherits the title of Black Knight, Geltgelt meets his end fighting Bull Taurus. Geltgelt is later revived and killed once again by the Megarangers in Seijuu Sentai Gingaman vs. Megaranger. Voiced by Shun Yashiro.
- Morgumorgu (モルグモルグ, Morugumorugu) is a mummy-themed Majin. He intended to revive Daitanix using the extracted beauty of 81 virgins. He can wrap his bandages around women's faces and steal/extract their beauty by turning it into grains of sand. He is killed by Bull Taurus & Super Armor Shine Gingaioh. He is one of the five majins that Iliess revives to keep the Gingaman from approaching her Mystical Tower. He holds off Saya while the rest of the team destroys the tower. He disappears when Ryouma destroys the tower. Voiced by Shōzō Iizuka.
- Hielahiela (ヒエラヒエラ, Hierahiera) is a fallen angel-themed Majin who wields a bow and arrow. She could fire explosive arrows and, when majorly attacked, she'd shatter into ice cubes and reform. This ability, however, only worked until the giant iceberg containing the frozen souls of 111 people was destroyed. She can also breathe out a short, but powerful, wintery blast of ice from her mouth. She intended to revive Daitanix using 111 frozen souls. This worked by her shooting an arrow into someone making them act cold and emotionless. After a few hours, she would summon them to a cave and remove the arrow, now a rosy red, and put it into the iceberg. She is killed by Bull Taurus & Super Armor Shine Gingaioh. She is one of the five majins revived by Iliess to keep the Gingaman from reaching the tower and attacks Hikaru, only to disappear when Ryouma destroys the tower. She is later revived by Gregory and killed once again by the Megarangers in Seijuu Sentai Gingaman vs. Megaranger. Voiced by Emi Shinohara.
- Barukibaruki (バルキバルキ, Barukibaruki) is a Bigfoot-themed Majin. Barukibaruki is given Biznella's remote control and asked to command the brainwashed Steel Starbeasts. Barukibaruki could fire a green laser from his clawed hand in battle. He is killed by Super Armor Shine Gingaioh after being assaulted from the vengeful Giga Rhinos, Giga Phoenix & Giga Bitus. Barukibaruki is one of the five majin whom Illiess resurrected to keep the Gingaman from reaching her tower. He holds off Gouki, and later disappears when Ryouma destroys the tower. Voiced by Masami Iwasaki.
- Gaaragaara (ガーラガーラ, Gāragāra) is an Asura-themed Majin, able to extend his arms to grab opponents from afar. Posing as a fortune teller, Garagara gathers palm imprints of 333 hands to perform a ritual that will revive Daitanix while turning those he deceived into stone within an hour. Among the inflicted are Hayate and Yuuta, with the others and Hyuga managing to ruin Garagara's ritual. With Ginga Green joining the fray, the Beast Armor Shine Gingamen defeat Garagara. Drinking his Barba-X, Garagara overpowers Gingaioh until the Koseijuu intervene with the Majin destroyed by Gingaioh, GigaRhinos, and GigaPhoenix's trademark attacks. A construct of Garagara is created by Illiess to protect her tower from the Gingaman, holding Hyuuga before Ryouma destroys the tower. During the events of Seijuu Sentai Gingaman vs. Megaranger, Garagara is revived before being killed again by the Megarangers. Voiced by Yoku Shioya.
- Merudameruda (メルダメルダ, Merudameruda) is Medoumedou's Lamiai-themed sister armed with a whip and the cobra-themed Gorgondia motorcycle. Merudameruda is sent by her mother Illiess to revive Daitanix using the fear of 22 people, trapping them within her necklace. Among her victims is Yuriko, with her older brother Ichirou calling the Majin out to get his sister back. But Merudameruda overpowers him before Ryouma drives her off. However, when the Gingamen corner her, Merudameruda summons Gorgondia to overwhelm the Beast Armor Shine Gingamen. With Ichirou giving them time, the Gingamen create the Galeo Pulsar so Ginga Red can destroy Gorgondia. With her victims freed, Merudameruda drinks her Barba-X to battle Super Armor Shine Gingaioh with her illusionary magic. However, GigaRhinos intervenes and Merudameruda is destroyed by Super Armor Shine Gingaioh. Voiced by Miho Yamada.
- Desphias (デスフィアス, Desufiasu) is a Pharaoh-themed Majin who is also Iliess' younger brother and strongest servant, armed with a staff. Desphias is sent to revive Daitanix using the sadness of 3,333 people by using his "Mask of Sorrow" on them. With the male members of the Gingamen and Hyuga among the inflicted, Saya embarks to Tokiwa Forest to obtain berries that can momentarily cease the sadness. With the aid of a boy named Kyouhei, Saya obtains the berries. Defeated by the Beast Armor Shine Gingaman and the Black Knight, with his staff destroyed, Desphias drinks his Barba-X and goes on a rampage. Overwhelming Super Armor Shine Gingaioh, before GigaPhoenix intervenes, Desphias is destroyed by Super Armor Shine Gingaioh. Desphias is later revived by Gregory and killed once again by the Megarangers in Seijuu Sentai Gingaman vs. Megaranger. Voiced by Kenji Nomura.

===== Battobas Majin Corps =====
The Battobas Majin Corps (バットバス魔人部隊, Battobasu Majin Butai) are machine/weapon-based Majin, the last series of Majin to appear. The members of Battobas Army seek to fully awaken Daitanix after their leader succeeded in resurrecting it. Their Balba-X container is an ale barrel and their symbol is a stylized anchor, proclaiming a Strategy Change upon drinking it. Whenever a member of the Battobas Majin Corps appears, he has the Yahtots introduce them while praising their strength.

- Bammers (バマース, Bamāsu) is a hammer-themed Majin armed with a mallet and a machine gun built in his chest, he is sent to gather a large amount glass needed to build a pacemaker for Daitanix. Though he overpowered Ginga Blue, Ms. Suzuko gives him the strength to overpower Bammers. Defeated by Beast Armor Shine Ginga Blue, Bammers drinks his Baruba-X and overwhelms Super Armor Shine Gingaioh until Giga Rhinos turns the tables so Gingaioh can finish the Majin off. Bammer is later revived during the events of Seijuu Sentai Gingaman vs. Megaranger, destroyed by the Megarangers. Voiced by Hiroyuki Rinzo.
- Bombus (ボンブス, Bonbusu) is a cannonball-themed Majin able to turn his right hand into a bazooka. Bombus is sent to heat up a special healing ore for Daitanix's heart by having his Yarots plant thirty specially made bombs across Tokyo so the heat from the intense explosion turning the city into an inferno would be effective. However, an accidental detonation reveals Bombus's actions to the Gingamen with the scheme foiled by Hayate with Haruhiko's help. After being defeated by the Beast Armor Shine Ginga Green, Bombus drinks Balba-X before he is destroyed by Super Armor Shine Gingaioh with assistance from Giga Phoenix. Bombus later among the resurrected Barban Majin destroyed by the Megarangers in Seijuu Sentai Gingaman vs. Megaranger. Voiced by Toshiharu Sakurai.
- Gopies (ゴビース, Gobīsu) is a copier/knight chess piece-themed Majin who can scan and copy his opponent's weapons and attacks into exact duplications. He was sent to kill Gou Taurus as part of a plot to complete Daitanix's revival. But the plan failed when Bucrates overheard him and got to Gou Taurus before him and the Yartots. However, he became confused when the Gingaman performed each other's trademark attacks and/or wielded the other's weapons (Red doing Green's moves, Yellow doing Blue, Green doing Pink, Blue doing Yellow, and Pink doing Red), followed by activating Beast Armor Shine to summon the Galeo Pulsar to finish him off. Gopies is enlarged, but is eventually killed in the confusion by Giga Phoenix using Giga Rhinos' Gigantis Buster and then by Super Armor Shine Gingaioh. Voiced by Kairi Narita.
- Magdus (マグダス, Magudasu) is a magnet-themed Majin. He wields a large staff with a magnet on the end. He kidnapped children in an attempt to somehow use them to clean Daitanix's veins. He is killed by Super Armor Shine Gingaioh after getting thrashed by Giga Rhinos and again by the Megarangers in Seijuu Sentai Gingaman vs. Megaranger. Voiced by Hajime Koseki.
- Bazoogas (バズガス, Bazugasu) is a bazooka-themed and bazooka-wielding Majin. He tries to enlarge a massage machine for Daitanix. He also accidentally enlarges Saya, who takes advantage of her size and threatened to crush him if he did not restore her to her proper size, which he does eventually do. He is killed by Giga Phoenix and Super Armor Shine Gingaioh and again by the Megarangers in Seijuu Sentai Gingaman vs. Megaranger. Voiced by Masami Iwasaki.
- Degius (デギウス, Degiusu) is a wrecking ball-themed warrior who wields a wrecking ball-themed flail. He was once a warrior of good who became corrupted and joined the ranks of the Barban. He is eventually killed being forced to give energy to revive Daitanix. When he dies, Ginga Yellow turns his sword into a monument of sorts to remember him by placing his sword on the beach to look like a cross gravestone sticking out of the sand. Voiced by Kiyoshi Kobayashi.
- The Battobas Special Squad (バットバス特殊部隊, Battobasu Tokushu-butai) are a special Majin used by Battobas to awaken and enlarge the Earth Demon Beast.
  - Dangs (ダングス, Dangusu) is a tank-themed Majin. He was the first to attempt giving the Earth Beast the new Extreme Growth Extract. He is killed by Giga Rhinos & Super Armor Shine Gingaioh and later by the Megarangers in Seijuu Sentai Gingaman vs. Megaranger. Voiced by Hiroshi Koike.
  - {{nihongo|Chainzaws (ヂェンゾス Chenzosu, 45, Gingaman vs. Megaranger) is a chainsaw-themed and chainsaw-wielding Majin. He tried to use an industrial chimney to give the Earth Beast the Extreme Growth Extract. He is killed by Giga Phoenix & Super Armor Shine Gingaioh and again by the Megarangers in Seijuu Sentai Gingaman vs. Megaranger. Voiced by Kyōsei Tsukui.
  - Zakkas (ザッカス, Zakkasu) is a Masakari-themed Majin. He wields a crescent blade in battle. He was summoned to destroy the land of a site in which the Extreme Growth Extract was to be poured. He is killed by Super Armor Shine Gingaioh after being attacked many times by Giga Rhinos. Voiced by Akio Ōtsuka.
  - Mizziles (ミザルス, Mizarusu) is a missile-themed Majin. He was summoned to shoot a missile containing the Extreme Growth Extract to the Earth Beast. He also had smaller, built-in, missile launchers in his wrists, which he used in battle. Initially he had the advantage as the Gingamen were weakening since the Extreme Growth Extract was poisoning the Earth and affecting their Earth Powers until Wisdom Tree Moak sacrifices himself to remove this. Afterwards they succeed in foiling his plan and then defeat him. He is killed by Gingaioh, with help from Giga Phoenix. Voiced by Masayuki Omoro.

===== Demon Beasts =====
The Demom Beasts are three powerful aliens.

====== Daitanix ======
Demon Beast Daitanix (魔獣ダイタニクス, Majū Daitanikusu) is a dinosaur-themed Demon Beast who was born in a contaminated star (which also happened to be Zahab's home planet) and his only instinct/purpose is to destroy planets by absorbing their life force to condense into jewels, which Zahab would add to his collection to maintain his immortality and to expand the lives of his followers. In battle, Daitanix possesses powerful jaws, his tail is extremely muscular, and he can fire powerful blasts of energy from his mouth. By attaching his castle to Daitanix's back, Zahab was able to control him, destroying and absorbing stars throughout the Milky Way. The goal of the Barban is the resurrection of Daitanix which was still in a state of lifelessness after the seal was broken in the earthquake. The plan finally succeeds when Iliess' lifeforce is absorbed by him. It results in the monster's heart beating and Battobas eventually gathered enough energy to fully revive him by having Degius act as a conduct for a massive amount of energy from a passing Asteroid. When finally revived, he easily defeated Super Armor Shine GingaiOh even with Giga Rhinos and Giga Phoenix, but his body decays during the fight as his back where the Barban castle stood had gotten too far rotten, so the Barban leave the monster to die. After the Gingamen and Black Knight damage his back in the following battle he is overpowered by Bull Taurus armed with the Knight Axe, double-teaming Giga Phoenix and Giga Rhinos, and then finally killed by Super Armor Shine GingaiOh.

====== Earth Demon Beast ======
The Earth Demon Beast (地球魔獣, Chikyū Majū) was the result of a piece of Daitanix's flesh ending up within the Earth itself upon being destroyed, feeding on the life of the planet. The Barban then decides to make him the new host of their castle. However, having just been born, the Earth Demon Beast was still in an immature state, so Battobas attempts to give him the Extreme Growth Extract eventually succeeding with the monster now fully grown but at the cost of his life. At full size, he possessed immense brute strength, could breathe fire, and was able to fire deadly bursts of energy from his claws. During the battle, Ryouma focuses on using his Earth element of fire so they could destroy the Earth Demon Beast without the risk of creating a new Demon Beast. Having attached the castle to him, Zahab confronts Gingaman, increasing the Earth Demon Beast's fighting abilities. The Earth Demon Beast puts up an excellent fight, to which Hyuuga uses up most of Bull Taurus's power to destroy Zahab's castle and fight Zahab elsewhere to give the others a fighting chance. After a hard battle, the beast is killed by a sustained burst of fire from Super Armor Shine GingaiOh after gaining a power boost from Giga Rhinos and Giga Phoenix, which incinerates his body in the process.

====== Ghelmadix ======
Demon Beast Fortress Ghelmadix (魔獣要塞ゲルマディック, Majū Yōsai Gerumadikusu) is the second red-colored Daitanix that belongs to Gregory. Originally, it was called Daitanix 2. Giga Rhinos and Giga Phoenix use all their power to try to destroy it, which cause themselves to be destroyed in the process. Unfortunately, Daitanix 2 was only injured, and used the Earth's energy to heal itself, becoming a blue-colored version of itself, now named Ghelmadix. It is killed by Bull Taurus and Super Armor Shine GingaiOh.

== Episodes ==
No.	Title	Original release date
1	"The Legendary Blades"; Transliteration: "Densetsu no Yaiba" (Japanese: 伝説の刃(やいば))	February 22, 1998
On the day the 133rd Gingaman squadron receive their duty, the Space Pirates Balban reawaken; forcing the team into action where the fall of one will lead to the emergence of a new hero...
2	"The Starbeasts' Return"; Transliteration: "Seijū no Sairai" (Japanese: 星獣の再来)	March 1, 1998
The Balban begin to search for a means to revive their bestial ship Daitanix; as Shelinda invades the Ginga Forest forcing a decision where Gingaman's fate hangs in the balance.
3	"The Earth's Wisdom"; Transliteration: "Daichi no Chie" (Japanese: 大地の知恵)	March 8, 1998
As Sambash officially becomes Zahab's subordinate for reviving Daitanix, Gouki shows doubt in abandoning the Ginga Forest due to a particular reason.
4	"The Earth's Heart"; Transliteration: "Āsu no Kokoro" (Japanese: アースの心)	March 15, 1998
Hikaru gets into trouble with Hayate when he uses his electric Earth for menial tasks as Sambash's latest subordinate tries to absorb electricity for Daitanix.
5	"The Sure-Kill Fang"; Transliteration: "Hissatsu no Kiba" (Japanese: 必殺の機刃（きば）)	March 22, 1998
Sambash summons a weapon-collecting subordinate in order to gather for recreating a dangerous weapon, leading to the Starbeast Swords and Ryouma being put in danger as he tries to make them his own.
6	"The Starbeasts' Crisis"; Transliteration: "Seijū no Kiki" (Japanese: 星獣の危機)	March 29, 1998
When Sambash releases a Majin that poisons the air of Earth in hopes of healing Daitanix, Gingaman and Yuuta face a deadly crisis that only the Starbeasts may be capable of stopping at a high cost...
7	"Time of Revival"; Transliteration: "Fukkatsu no Toki" (Japanese: 復活の時)	April 5, 1998
The Gingaman must discover the way to use their Kiba Blades to bring back the Starbeasts before their power can be co-opted by the brother Majin Tagredor and Torbador for Daitanix!
8	"Love's Culinary"; Transliteration: "Aijō no Ryōri" (Japanese: 愛情の料理)	April 12, 1998
Hikaru is taken in by a motherly chef who wants to teach him the ways of good cooking even while Sambash's Majin searches for the best food to awaken Daitanix.
9	"Secret Kitten"; Transliteration: "Himitsu no Koneko" (Japanese: 秘密の子猫)	April 19, 1998
A meteorite seals away Gingat's power, turning it into a small feline that a girl adopts in place of her missing cat.
10	"The Wind's Flute"; Transliteration: "Kaze no Fue" (Japanese: 風の笛)	April 26, 1998
When a Majin tries to use noise to revive Daitanix, Hayate's flute-playing may be the only remedy to deal with it; despite the memories and danger brought about by this.
11	"A Warrior's Devotion"; Transliteration: "Senshi no Junjō" (Japanese: 戦士の純情)	May 3, 1998
Gouki falls in love with Yuuta's teacher while helping him out with a school visit; while Sambash uses a Majin to assist him as part of his ultimate plan.
12	"Nightmare Reunited"; Transliteration: "Akumu no Saikai" (Japanese: 悪夢の再会)	May 10, 1998
Sambash reveals the truth of his ultimate plan by bringing back Hyuuga to force the Gingaman to play by his rules; but what appears to be a reunion reveals a devious hand at play.
13	"Beast Attack Rehearsal"; Transliteration: "Gyakuten no Jūgekibō" (Japanese: 逆転の獣撃棒)	May 17, 1998
As Budou decides to search for the Lights of Ginga as Barban's new general, Wisdom Tree Moak finds itself in grave danger even as it forms new weapons for Gingaman.
14	"Two Sayas"; Transliteration: "Futari no Saya" (Japanese: 二人のサヤ)	May 24, 1998
Saya takes the place of an actress she looks like in order to help film a movie as a Majin takes target on cameras for the Lights of Ginga.
15	"Terrifying Hiccups"; Transliteration: "Kyōfu no Shakkuri" (Japanese: 恐怖のしゃっくり)	May 31, 1998
Ryouma accidentally gives Hikaru an ancient Balban bomb as a cold remedy, making him hiccup his way towards potentially blowing them up!
16	"Homeland of the Heart"; Transliteration: "Kokoro no Kokyō" (Japanese: 心の故郷)	June 7, 1998
Hayate and Gingaman try to impress a man claiming to be the father of the equestrian club owner; as Budoh's latest Majin soaks the ground for the Lights of Ginga.
17	"True Courage"; Transliteration: "Hontō no Yūki" (Japanese: 本当の勇気)	June 14, 1998
Ryouma tries to teach a lesson to Yuuta about the meaning of courage as Gingaman tries to deal with a Majin trying to destroy skyscrapers with humanoid machines for the Lights of Ginga.
18	"The Mysterious Black Knight"; Transliteration: "Nazo no Kuro Kishi" (Japanese: 謎の黒騎士)	June 28, 1998
BullBlack, a mysterious knight from 3000 years in the past, revives to open a new rivalry in the frantic search for the Lights of Ginga!
19	"The Vengeful Knight"; Transliteration: "Fukushū no Kishi" (Japanese: 復讐の騎士)	July 5, 1998
As Gingaman discovers the reason behind BullBlack's battle against the Barban, they try to convince him against his reckless ways for the sake of vengeance.
20	"The One-Man Battle"; Transliteration: "Hitori no Tatakai" (Japanese: ひとりの戦い)	July 12, 1998
When Budoh's latest Majin general puts his team and the town to sleep for the Lights of Ginga, Ryouma must fight on his own to figure out how to defeat it, even as BullBlack and his ideals get in his way.
21	"The Tomato's Trial"; Transliteration: "Tomato no Shiren" (Japanese: トマトの試練)	July 19, 1998
When Hayate becomes hurt by Budoh's latest Majin targeting tomatoes, he has to get over his fear of this fruit in order to heal himself to help his teammates.
22	"Appearance of Light"; Transliteration: "Hikari no Shutsugen" (Japanese: 光の出現)	August 2, 1998
Hikaru and Saya must work together to escape from a dome placed by Budoh's Majin to prevent anyone from stopping his extraction project for the Lights of Ginga!
23	"End of the Contest"; Transliteration: "Sōdatsu no Hate" (Japanese: 争奪の果て)	August 9, 1998
With the Lights of Ginga released, it's a four-way showdown to claim them, leading to unexpected twists before their wielder finally emerges...
24	"Budou's Tenacity"; Transliteration: "Budo no Shūnen" (Japanese: ブドーの執念)	August 16, 1998
Budoh escapes from Balban captivity to fight until his crimes are finally clear, even as Spectral Empress Iliess begins her battle as the new general of the crew!
25	"The Black Knight's Determination"; Transliteration: "Kuro Kishi no Ketsui" (Japanese: 黒騎士の決意)	August 23, 1998
BullBlack decides to sacrifice the Earth in hopes of stopping the Balban, forcing the rage of Ryouma even as the Black Knight finally reveals his means of survival..
26	"Brothers of Flame"; Transliteration: "Honō no Kyōdai" (Japanese: 炎の兄弟)	August 30, 1998
Ryouma tries to find the means to speak to his older brother Hyuuga about his future as a Gingaman as the rest of the team becomes captured by Illies' mirror-manipulating Majin.
27	"The Mummy's Allure"; Transliteration: "Miira no Yūwaku" (Japanese: ミイラの誘惑)	September 6, 1998
Hyuuga draws the ire of Saya when he starts protecting a girl being targeted by a Majin draining female youth for Daitanix.
28	"Papa's Sudden Change"; Transliteration: "Papa no Hyōhen" (Japanese: パパの豹変)	September 13, 1998
Gouki helps Yuuta try to save his father Haruhiko after a Majin steals his loving heart for another spell for Daitanix's revival.
29	"Dark Merchant"; Transliteration: "Yami no Shōnin" (Japanese: 闇の商人)	September 20, 1998
Zahab and Battobas summon a merchant ally who captures Hikaru and Hyuuga to use them in a plan to activate three special weapons.
30	"Steel Starbeasts"; Transliteration: "Hagane no Seijū" (Japanese: 鋼の星獣)	September 27, 1998
As the Gingaman realizes their new opponents are captured and transformed Starbeasts, they try to figure out how to save them as Zahab sets to using them for taking the squadron down.
31	"Cursed Stone"; Transliteration: "Noroi no Ishi" (Japanese: 呪いの石)	October 4, 1998
Hayate and Yuuta fall under a curse of a Majin turning them into stone as a means to switch Daitanix's curse onto them!
32	"The Mobile Horse of Friendship"; Transliteration: "Yūjō no Kidō Uma" (Japanese: 友情の機動馬)	October 11, 1998
Ryouma works to save the sister of a motorbike shop owner in order to regain his trust after she becomes captured by a Majin collecting fear for Daitanix.
33	"Yearning for Saya"; Transliteration: "Akogare no Saya" (Japanese: 憧れのサヤ)	October 18, 1998
Saya tries to deal with a boy trying to act cool to win her heart as Illies sends her little brother in a desperate attempt to revive Daitanix with sorrow.
34	"Invulnerable Iliess"; Transliteration: "Fujimi no Iriesu" (Japanese: 不死身のイリエス)	October 25, 1998
Given a final chance to revive a rotting Daitanix, Illies uses her most powerful magic to force Gingaman into a showdown to reach her before she complete's the beast's revival!
35	"Gouki's Choice"; Transliteration: "Gōki no Sentaku" (Japanese: ゴウキの選択)	November 1, 1998
Gouki tries to muster up the courage to tell Suzuko how he feels even as he has to deal with both a new romantic rival and Battobas' new campaign for reviving Daitanix.
36	"Invincible Haruhiko"; Transliteration: "Muteki no Haruhiko" (Japanese: 無敵の晴彦)	November 8, 1998
After becoming stuck together by glue, Hayate & Haruhiko work together to stop a Majin planning on blowing up a city in order to heat up Daitanix's heart.
37	"Bucrates's Ambition"; Transliteration: "Bukuratesu no Yabō" (Japanese: ブクラテスの野望)	November 15, 1998
While Hyuuga continues to watch over the wounded GoTaurus, both the Balban and Bucrates are after GouTaurus for their own nefarious schemes.
38	"Hyuuga's Determination"; Transliteration: "Hyūga no Ketsudan" (Japanese: ヒュウガの決断)	November 22, 1998
In order to save GoTaurus, Hyuuga must make a decision on whether to follow Bucrates, even if it means doing something that will further estrange him from Ryouma and Gingaman!
39	"The Heart's Massage"; Transliteration: "Kokoro no Massāji" (Japanese: 心のマッサージ)	November 29, 1998
An angered Saya must learn how to open her heart from a karate teaching masseuse as she becomes targeted by a Majin using Baruba X missiles to grow people to massage Daitanix's heart.
40	"The Majin of Sadness"; Transliteration: "Kanashimi no Majin" (Japanese: 哀しみの魔人)	December 6, 1998
Battobas summons a sacrificial Majin to be used in a scheme to revive Daitanix; even as the warrior desires one final battle with Hikaru before his eventual death.
41	"The Demon-Beast's Revival"; Transliteration: "Majū no Fukkatsu" (Japanese: 魔獣の復活)	December 13, 1998
With Daitanix's revival at hand, Gingaman head forth to stop the Demon-Beast, as Hyuuga and Bucrates likewise try to stop Zahab before he can destroy the Earth.
42	"The Horrible Demon-Beast"; Transliteration: "Senritsu no Majū" (Japanese: 戦慄の魔獣)	December 20, 1998
With Ryouma taken down by Zahab, Hyuuga and Yuuta must work to save him as the rest of Gingaman must stop the rampage of the massive Daitanix before it destroys everything.
43	"Legendary Footprints"; Transliteration: "Densetsu no Ashioto" (Japanese: 伝説の足跡)	December 27, 1998
Gingaman recalls all of their adventures and trials facing the Barban while looking over pictures for Haruhiko's new book about them.
44	"Earth's Demon-Beast"; Transliteration: "Chikyū no Majū" (Japanese: 地球の魔獣)	January 3, 1999
Gouki is asked by Kishimoto to apprentice under GingaBlue, as Zahab reveals an unexpected trump card put into play for the Barban.
45	"The Fairy's Tears"; Transliteration: "Yōsei no Namida" (Japanese: 妖精の涙)	January 10, 1999
Saya receives a flower from a mysterious girl that she must figure out how to utilize in order to hold back the progress of the Earth Demon-Beast.
46	"Winds of Rage"; Transliteration: "Ikari no Kaze" (Japanese: 怒りの風)	January 17, 1999
Shellinda uses the memory and image of Hayate's fiance in order to force him into a showdown with her in an attempt to try and prove her worth towards him.
47	"The Demon's Scheme"; Transliteration: "Akuma no Sakuryaku" (Japanese: 悪魔の策略)	January 24, 1999
Biznella sets up a trap in order to lure Gingaman into their own destruction while pursuing the Earth Demon-Beast, which only Hikaru can prevent from going off.
48	"Moak's End"; Transliteration: "Mōku no Saigo" (Japanese: モークの最期)	January 31, 1999
As the Earth Demon-Beast corrodes the planet with pollution, Moak decides to make a sacrificial move in order to prevent its power from hurting the planet or Gingaman. Meanwhile, the Balban locates Bucrates and Hyuuga's location.
49	"The Miraculous Mountain"; Transliteration: "Kiseki no Yama" (Japanese: 奇跡の山)	February 7, 1999
With the Barban preparing to go all out to summon and grow the Earth Demon-Beast, Gingaman heads into a showdown to stop the creature; while Hyuuga finally learns the means to fully bring their battle to an end...
50	"Tomorrow's Legends"; Transliteration: "Ashita no Rejendo" (Japanese: 明日の伝説（レジェンド）)	February 14, 1999
As Captain Zahab takes the grown Earth Demon-Beast as his new steed to return to his pirate ways, the Gingaman and Hyuuga must stop him and the giant beast in order to prevent him from destroying their world for his own gains.

== Cast ==
- Ryouma: Kazuki Maehara (前原 一輝, Mahara Kazuki)
- Hayate: Koji (Played as Koji Sueyoshi (末吉 宏司, Sueyoshi Kōji))
- Gouki: Shōei (照英)
- Hikaru: Nobuaki Takahashi (高橋 伸顕, Takahashi Nobuaki)
- Saya, Misaki Hoshino (14): Juri Miyazawa (宮澤 寿梨, Miyazawa Juri)
- Hyuuga: Teruaki Ogawa (小川 輝晃, Ogawa Teruaki)
- Haruhiko Aoyama: Yoshihiko Takamoku (高杢 禎彦, Takamoku Yoshihiko)
- Yuuta Aoyama: Shogo Hayakawa (早川 翔吾, Hayakawa Shōgo)
- Suzuko Mizusawa: Makiko Yoshida (吉田 真希子, Yoshida Makiko)
- Shunsuke Kishimoto: Yūji Kishi (岸 祐二, Kishi Yūji)
- Orghi: Hiroshi Arikawa (有川 博, Arikawa Hiroshi)
- Miharu: Noriko Tanaka (田中 規子, Tanaka Noriko)
- Krantz (クランツ, Kurantsu): Masanori Ōtani (大谷 政憲, Ōtani Masanori)
- Shellinda: Kei Mizutani (水谷 ケイ, Mizutani Kei)

=== Voice cast ===
- Moak: Rokurō Naya (納谷 六朗, Naya Rokurō)
- Bokku: Sanae Miyuki (深雪 さなえ, Miyuki Sanae)
- Bull Black: Kōji Ochiai (落合 弘治, Ochiai Kōji)
- Zahab: Hidekatsu Shibata (柴田 秀勝, Shibata Hidekatsu)
- Bucrates: Chafurin (茶風林, Chafūrin)
- Sambash: Nobuyuki Hiyama (檜山 修之, Hiyama Nobuyuki)
- Budoh: Kazuo Hayashi (林 一夫, Hayashi Kazuo)
- Iliess: Gara Takashima (高島 雅羅, Takashima Gara)
- Battobas: Takeshi Watabe (渡部 猛, Watabe Takeshi)
- Biznella: Kaneto Shiozawa (塩沢 兼人, Shiozawa Kaneto)
- Narrator: Norio Wakamoto (若本 規夫, Wakamoto Norio)

== Songs ==
Opening theme

- "Seijuu Sentai Gingaman" (星獣戦隊ギンガマン, Seijū Sentai Gingaman)
  - Lyrics: Shoko Fujibayashi (藤林 聖子, Fujibayashi Shōko)
  - Composition & Arrangement: Toshihiko Sahashi (佐橋 俊彦, Sahashi Toshihiko)
  - Artist: Ryu Kisami (希砂未 竜, Kisami Ryū)

Ending theme

- "Hadashi no Kokoro de" (はだしの心で; "Free Mind")
  - Lyrics: Shoko Fujibayashi
  - Composition: Masao Deguchi (出口 雅生, Deguchi Masao)
  - Arrangement: Kōichirō Kameyama (亀山 耕一郎, Kameyama Kōichirō)
  - Artist: Ryu Kisami
