= List of Seijuu Sentai Gingaman episodes =

This is a list of episodes for Seijuu Sentai Gingaman, the twenty-second incarnation of the long running Super Sentai series. Each episode is referred to as a chapter.

== Episode list ==
| No. | Title | Original release date |
|---|---|---|
| 1 | "The Legendary Blades"; Transliteration: "Densetsu no Yaiba" (Japanese: 伝説の刃(やいば)) | February 22, 1998 |
On the day the 133rd Gingaman squadron receive their duty, the Space Pirates Balban reawaken; forcing the team into action where the fall of one will lead to the emergence of a new hero...
| 2 | "The Starbeasts' Return"; Transliteration: "Seijū no Sairai" (Japanese: 星獣の再来) | March 1, 1998 |
The Balban begin to search for a means to revive their bestial ship Daitanix; as Shelinda invades the Ginga Forest forcing a decision where Gingaman's fate hangs in the balance.
| 3 | "The Earth's Wisdom"; Transliteration: "Daichi no Chie" (Japanese: 大地の知恵) | March 8, 1998 |
As Sambash officially becomes Zahab's subordinate for reviving Daitanix, Gouki shows doubt in abandoning the Ginga Forest due to a particular reason.
| 4 | "The Earth's Heart"; Transliteration: "Āsu no Kokoro" (Japanese: アースの心) | March 15, 1998 |
Hikaru gets into trouble with Hayate when he uses his electric Earth for menial tasks as Sambash's latest subordinate tries to absorb electricity for Daitanix.
| 5 | "The Sure-Kill Fang"; Transliteration: "Hissatsu no Kiba" (Japanese: 必殺の機刃（きば）) | March 22, 1998 |
Sambash summons a weapon-collecting subordinate in order to gather for recreating a dangerous weapon, leading to the Starbeast Swords and Ryouma being put in danger as he tries to make them his own.
| 6 | "The Starbeasts' Crisis"; Transliteration: "Seijū no Kiki" (Japanese: 星獣の危機) | March 29, 1998 |
When Sambash releases a Majin that poisons the air of Earth in hopes of healing Daitanix, Gingaman and Yuuta face a deadly crisis that only the Starbeasts may be capable of stopping at a high cost...
| 7 | "Time of Revival"; Transliteration: "Fukkatsu no Toki" (Japanese: 復活の時) | April 5, 1998 |
The Gingaman must discover the way to use their Kiba Blades to bring back the Starbeasts before their power can be co-opted by the brother Majin Tagredor and Torbador for Daitanix!
| 8 | "Love's Culinary"; Transliteration: "Aijō no Ryōri" (Japanese: 愛情の料理) | April 12, 1998 |
Hikaru is taken in by a motherly chef who wants to teach him the ways of good cooking even while Sambash's Majin searches for the best food to awaken Daitanix.
| 9 | "Secret Kitten"; Transliteration: "Himitsu no Koneko" (Japanese: 秘密の子猫) | April 19, 1998 |
A meteorite seals away Gingat's power, turning it into a small feline that a girl adopts in place of her missing cat.
| 10 | "The Wind's Flute"; Transliteration: "Kaze no Fue" (Japanese: 風の笛) | April 26, 1998 |
When a Majin tries to use noise to revive Daitanix, Hayate's flute-playing may be the only remedy to deal with it; despite the memories and danger brought about by this.
| 11 | "A Warrior's Devotion"; Transliteration: "Senshi no Junjō" (Japanese: 戦士の純情) | May 3, 1998 |
Gouki falls in love with Yuuta's teacher while helping him out with a school visit; while Sambash uses a Majin to assist him as part of his ultimate plan.
| 12 | "Nightmare Reunited"; Transliteration: "Akumu no Saikai" (Japanese: 悪夢の再会) | May 10, 1998 |
Sambash reveals the truth of his ultimate plan by bringing back Hyuuga to force the Gingaman to play by his rules; but what appears to be a reunion reveals a devious hand at play.
| 13 | "Beast Attack Rehearsal"; Transliteration: "Gyakuten no Jūgekibō" (Japanese: 逆転の獣撃棒) | May 17, 1998 |
As Budou decides to search for the Lights of Ginga as Barban's new general, Wisdom Tree Moak finds itself in grave danger even as it forms new weapons for Gingaman.
| 14 | "Two Sayas"; Transliteration: "Futari no Saya" (Japanese: 二人のサヤ) | May 24, 1998 |
Saya takes the place of an actress she looks like in order to help film a movie as a Majin takes target on cameras for the Lights of Ginga.
| 15 | "Terrifying Hiccups"; Transliteration: "Kyōfu no Shakkuri" (Japanese: 恐怖のしゃっくり) | May 31, 1998 |
Ryouma accidentally gives Hikaru an ancient Balban bomb as a cold remedy, making him hiccup his way towards potentially blowing them up!
| 16 | "Homeland of the Heart"; Transliteration: "Kokoro no Kokyō" (Japanese: 心の故郷) | June 7, 1998 |
Hayate and Gingaman try to impress a man claiming to be the father of the equestrian club owner; as Budoh's latest Majin soaks the ground for the Lights of Ginga.
| 17 | "True Courage"; Transliteration: "Hontō no Yūki" (Japanese: 本当の勇気) | June 14, 1998 |
Ryouma tries to teach a lesson to Yuuta about the meaning of courage as Gingaman tries to deal with a Majin trying to destroy skyscrapers with humanoid machines for the Lights of Ginga.
| 18 | "The Mysterious Black Knight"; Transliteration: "Nazo no Kuro Kishi" (Japanese: 謎の黒騎士) | June 28, 1998 |
BullBlack, a mysterious knight from 3000 years in the past, revives to open a new rivalry in the frantic search for the Lights of Ginga!
| 19 | "The Vengeful Knight"; Transliteration: "Fukushū no Kishi" (Japanese: 復讐の騎士) | July 5, 1998 |
As Gingaman discovers the reason behind BullBlack's battle against the Barban, they try to convince him against his reckless ways for the sake of vengeance.
| 20 | "The One-Man Battle"; Transliteration: "Hitori no Tatakai" (Japanese: ひとりの戦い) | July 12, 1998 |
When Budoh's latest Majin general puts his team and the town to sleep for the Lights of Ginga, Ryouma must fight on his own to figure out how to defeat it, even as BullBlack and his ideals get in his way.
| 21 | "The Tomato's Trial"; Transliteration: "Tomato no Shiren" (Japanese: トマトの試練) | July 19, 1998 |
When Hayate becomes hurt by Budoh's latest Majin targeting tomatoes, he has to get over his fear of this fruit in order to heal himself to help his teammates.
| 22 | "Appearance of Light"; Transliteration: "Hikari no Shutsugen" (Japanese: 光の出現) | August 2, 1998 |
Hikaru and Saya must work together to escape from a dome placed by Budoh's Majin to prevent anyone from stopping his extraction project for the Lights of Ginga!
| 23 | "End of the Contest"; Transliteration: "Sōdatsu no Hate" (Japanese: 争奪の果て) | August 9, 1998 |
With the Lights of Ginga released, it's a four-way showdown to claim them, leading to unexpected twists before their wielder finally emerges...
| 24 | "Budou's Tenacity"; Transliteration: "Budo no Shūnen" (Japanese: ブドーの執念) | August 16, 1998 |
Budoh escapes from Balban captivity to fight until his crimes are finally clear, even as Spectral Empress Iliess begins her battle as the new general of the crew!
| 25 | "The Black Knight's Determination"; Transliteration: "Kuro Kishi no Ketsui" (Japanese: 黒騎士の決意) | August 23, 1998 |
BullBlack decides to sacrifice the Earth in hopes of stopping the Balban, forcing the rage of Ryouma even as the Black Knight finally reveals his means of survival..
| 26 | "Brothers of Flame"; Transliteration: "Honō no Kyōdai" (Japanese: 炎の兄弟) | August 30, 1998 |
Ryouma tries to find the means to speak to his older brother Hyuuga about his future as a Gingaman as the rest of the team becomes captured by Illies' mirror-manipulating Majin.
| 27 | "The Mummy's Allure"; Transliteration: "Miira no Yūwaku" (Japanese: ミイラの誘惑) | September 6, 1998 |
Hyuuga draws the ire of Saya when he starts protecting a girl being targeted by a Majin draining female youth for Daitanix.
| 28 | "Papa's Sudden Change"; Transliteration: "Papa no Hyōhen" (Japanese: パパの豹変) | September 13, 1998 |
Gouki helps Yuuta try to save his father Haruhiko after a Majin steals his loving heart for another spell for Daitanix's revival.
| 29 | "Dark Merchant"; Transliteration: "Yami no Shōnin" (Japanese: 闇の商人) | September 20, 1998 |
Zahab and Battobas summon a merchant ally who captures Hikaru and Hyuuga to use them in a plan to activate three special weapons.
| 30 | "Steel Starbeasts"; Transliteration: "Hagane no Seijū" (Japanese: 鋼の星獣) | September 27, 1998 |
As the Gingaman realizes their new opponents are captured and transformed Starbeasts, they try to figure out how to save them as Zahab sets to using them for taking the squadron down.
| 31 | "Cursed Stone"; Transliteration: "Noroi no Ishi" (Japanese: 呪いの石) | October 4, 1998 |
Hayate and Yuuta fall under a curse of a Majin turning them into stone as a means to switch Daitanix's curse onto them!
| 32 | "The Mobile Horse of Friendship"; Transliteration: "Yūjō no Kidō Uma" (Japanese: 友情の機動馬) | October 11, 1998 |
Ryouma works to save the sister of a motorbike shop owner in order to regain his trust after she becomes captured by a Majin collecting fear for Daitanix.
| 33 | "Yearning for Saya"; Transliteration: "Akogare no Saya" (Japanese: 憧れのサヤ) | October 18, 1998 |
Saya tries to deal with a boy trying to act cool to win her heart as Illies sends her little brother in a desperate attempt to revive Daitanix with sorrow.
| 34 | "Invulnerable Iliess"; Transliteration: "Fujimi no Iriesu" (Japanese: 不死身のイリエス) | October 25, 1998 |
Given a final chance to revive a rotting Daitanix, Illies uses her most powerful magic to force Gingaman into a showdown to reach her before she complete's the beast's revival!
| 35 | "Gouki's Choice"; Transliteration: "Gōki no Sentaku" (Japanese: ゴウキの選択) | November 1, 1998 |
Gouki tries to muster up the courage to tell Suzuko how he feels even as he has to deal with both a new romantic rival and Battobas' new campaign for reviving Daitanix.
| 36 | "Invincible Haruhiko"; Transliteration: "Muteki no Haruhiko" (Japanese: 無敵の晴彦) | November 8, 1998 |
After becoming stuck together by glue, Hayate & Haruhiko work together to stop a Majin planning on blowing up a city in order to heat up Daitanix's heart.
| 37 | "Bucrates's Ambition"; Transliteration: "Bukuratesu no Yabō" (Japanese: ブクラテスの野望) | November 15, 1998 |
While Hyuuga continues to watch over the wounded GoTaurus, both the Balban and Bucrates are after GouTaurus for their own nefarious schemes.
| 38 | "Hyuuga's Determination"; Transliteration: "Hyūga no Ketsudan" (Japanese: ヒュウガの決断) | November 22, 1998 |
In order to save GoTaurus, Hyuuga must make a decision on whether to follow Bucrates, even if it means doing something that will further estrange him from Ryouma and Gingaman!
| 39 | "The Heart's Massage"; Transliteration: "Kokoro no Massāji" (Japanese: 心のマッサージ) | November 29, 1998 |
An angered Saya must learn how to open her heart from a karate teaching masseuse as she becomes targeted by a Majin using Baruba X missiles to grow people to massage Daitanix's heart.
| 40 | "The Majin of Sadness"; Transliteration: "Kanashimi no Majin" (Japanese: 哀しみの魔人) | December 6, 1998 |
Battobas summons a sacrificial Majin to be used in a scheme to revive Daitanix; even as the warrior desires one final battle with Hikaru before his eventual death.
| 41 | "The Demon-Beast's Revival"; Transliteration: "Majū no Fukkatsu" (Japanese: 魔獣の復活) | December 13, 1998 |
With Daitanix's revival at hand, Gingaman head forth to stop the Demon-Beast, as Hyuuga and Bucrates likewise try to stop Zahab before he can destroy the Earth.
| 42 | "The Horrible Demon-Beast"; Transliteration: "Senritsu no Majū" (Japanese: 戦慄の魔獣) | December 20, 1998 |
With Ryouma taken down by Zahab, Hyuuga and Yuuta must work to save him as the rest of Gingaman must stop the rampage of the massive Daitanix before it destroys everything.
| 43 | "Legendary Footprints"; Transliteration: "Densetsu no Ashioto" (Japanese: 伝説の足跡) | December 27, 1998 |
Gingaman recalls all of their adventures and trials facing the Barban while looking over pictures for Haruhiko's new book about them.
| 44 | "Earth's Demon-Beast"; Transliteration: "Chikyū no Majū" (Japanese: 地球の魔獣) | January 3, 1999 |
Gouki is asked by Kishimoto to apprentice under GingaBlue, as Zahab reveals an unexpected trump card put into play for the Barban.
| 45 | "The Fairy's Tears"; Transliteration: "Yōsei no Namida" (Japanese: 妖精の涙) | January 10, 1999 |
Saya receives a flower from a mysterious girl that she must figure out how to utilize in order to hold back the progress of the Earth Demon-Beast.
| 46 | "Winds of Rage"; Transliteration: "Ikari no Kaze" (Japanese: 怒りの風) | January 17, 1999 |
Shellinda uses the memory and image of Hayate's fiance in order to force him into a showdown with her in an attempt to try and prove her worth towards him.
| 47 | "The Demon's Scheme"; Transliteration: "Akuma no Sakuryaku" (Japanese: 悪魔の策略) | January 24, 1999 |
Biznella sets up a trap in order to lure Gingaman into their own destruction while pursuing the Earth Demon-Beast, which only Hikaru can prevent from going off.
| 48 | "Moak's End"; Transliteration: "Mōku no Saigo" (Japanese: モークの最期) | January 31, 1999 |
As the Earth Demon-Beast corrodes the planet with pollution, Moak decides to make a sacrificial move in order to prevent its power from hurting the planet or Gingaman. Meanwhile, the Balban locates Bucrates and Hyuuga's location.
| 49 | "The Miraculous Mountain"; Transliteration: "Kiseki no Yama" (Japanese: 奇跡の山) | February 7, 1999 |
With the Barban preparing to go all out to summon and grow the Earth Demon-Beast, Gingaman heads into a showdown to stop the creature; while Hyuuga finally learns the means to fully bring their battle to an end...
| 50 | "Tomorrow's Legends"; Transliteration: "Ashita no Rejendo" (Japanese: 明日の伝説（レジェンド）) | February 14, 1999 |
As Captain Zahab takes the grown Earth Demon-Beast as his new steed to return to his pirate ways, the Gingaman and Hyuuga must stop him and the giant beast in order to prevent him from destroying their world for his own gains.
