= Kurara Emi =

Japanese actress

- 映美くらら
- Born: June 15, 1979 (age 47); Kumamoto, Japan
- Occupation: Actress
- Years active: 1999–present
- Children: 2

Kurara Emi (映美 くらら, Emi Kurara; born June 15, 1979), is a Japanese actress. From 1999 to 2005, she was a member of Takarazuka Revue. She is known for her role as Yukimi Igarashi in Kamen Rider Revice.

== Biography ==
In 1997, Kurara entered Takarazuka Music School. Two years later, she joined the Takarazuka Revue as an 85th generation student. She was ranked 11th when she joined the team. Debuted on stage at the Snow Troupe performance "Reunion / Nova Bossa Nova".

Attracted attention from early on with her beauty and dance, she became the first heroine in a rookie performance in 2001's Hana no Narihira.

As a partner of Jun Shibuki, debuted at the same year's "Great Pirate / Jazz Mania" as a top combination at the large theater.

After Shibuki left the group in 2004, Nao Ayaki became Kurara's second partner, as new top combination with Ayaki was unveiled at the Grand Theater. On October 10 of the same year, she officially left the Takarazuka Revue with the final performance of "Asuka Yubae / Takarazuka Kenran II" in Tokyo, which was the debut of her new top combination with Ayaki at the Grand Theater.

She became an actress after she joined e-Concept.

== Notable performances and roles ==
=== Takarazuka era ===
==== Debut ====
Year	Performance	Troupe	Theater	Role	Note
1999	Meet Again / Nova Bossa Nova	Snow	Grand Theater		

==== Troupe rotation ====
Year	Performance	Troupe	Theater	Role	Note
1999	Orpheus in Spiral / Nova Bossa Nova	Moon	Grand Theater		
1999	Meet Again / Nova Bossa Nova	Snow	1000days Theater		

==== Star Troupe era ====
Year	Performance	Troupe	Theater	Role	New Actor Show Role	Note
2000	My Love Lies Over the Mountains / Great Century	Star	1000days Theater			
2000	Love Insurance	Star	Drama City			
2000	Golden Pharaoh / Miracat	Star	Grand Theater		Tia	
2000	Love Insurance	Star	Akasaka ACT			
2000	Flower Blizzard, Love Blizzard	Star	Bow Hall/Nippon Seinenkan	Chacha		
2001	Revolt of a Gallant Poet / Dreams Fly Around the World	Star	Grand Theater	Wakaba	Fujiwara no Takaiko (HY: Hoshina Yuri)	First New Actor Show Lead Musumeyaku
2001	The Rose of Versailles 2001: Oscar and Andre	Star	Grand Theater	noble child / Child Oscar	Rosalie (HY: Akisono Mio)	
2001	Ihatov Dream	Star	Bow Hall/Nippon Seinenkan	Miyazawa Toshi / Girl	First Small Theater Lead Musumeyaku	

==== Moon Troupe Top Musumeyaku era ====
Year	Performance	Troupe	Theater	Role	Note
2001	Great Pirates / Jazzmania	Moon	Tokyo Theater	Elaine	Top Musumeyaku Debut
2001	Great Pirates / Jazzmania	Moon	National Tour	Elaine	
2002	Guys and Dolls	Moon	Grand Theater	Sarah	
2002	Sarang Love / Jazz Mania	Moon	National Tour	Kim Sugyon	
2002	At the End of A Long Spring / With a Song in My Heart	Moon	Grand Theater	Eva	
2003	At the End of A Long Spring / With a Song in My Heart	Moon	Chunichi	Eva	
2003	Takarazuka Floral Diary / Senor Don Juan	Moon	Grand Theater	Jill	
2003-4	Seal of Roses	Moon	Grand Theater	Jennifer McCartney	
2004	Javanese Dancer	Moon	National Tour	Alvia	
2004	The Glow of Sunset in Asuka / Takarazuka Splendor II	Moon	Grand Theater	Meno	Last musical with Takarazuka

=== Television ===
Year	Title	Role	Notes	Ref.
2012	Suzuko no Koi	Suzuko Hyuga	Lead role	
2013	Jun and Ai	Ran Amakusa	Asadora	
2014	Blood on the Tracks	Rumiko Tozawa	Miniseries	
2016–18	99.9 Criminal Lawyer	Yukiko Sata	2 seasons	
2021	Kamen Rider Revice	Yukimi Igarashi		
2024	Wing-Man	Matsuoka-sensei		
2025	Unbound	Ōsaki	Taiga drama	
2026	Brothers in Arms	Shino	Taiga drama	

=== Film ===
Year	Title	Role	Notes	Ref.
2020	461 Days of Bento: A Promise Between Father and Son	Shuko Asai		
2021	Kamen Rider: Beyond Generations	Yukimi Igarashi		
2021	99.9 Criminal Lawyer: The Movie	Yukiko Sata		
2022	Kamen Rider Revice the Movie: Battle Familia	Yukimi Igarashi		
2025	Babanba Banban Vampire	Tamao Tatsuno		
2026	The Invisibles	Kokoro Hoshino		
