= Kei Mizutani =

Japanese actress (born 1974)

- Born: May 7, 1974 (age 52); Misawa, Aomori Prefecture, Japan
- Height: 162 cm (5 ft 4 in)

Kei Mizutani (水谷 ケイ, Mizutani Kei) (born May 7, 1974) is a Japanese actress and model. She has appeared in multiple photo books, movies, and TV series in Japan and her DVD sets are popular in Japan, the United States, and Europe.

== Career ==
Mizutani was born and raised in Aomori Prefecture. She began her modelling career as a swimsuit and nude model for magazines, and began making TV appearances. She became a regular on the late-night adult-oriented TV program variety, Gilgamesh Night.

=== Weather Woman ===
Mizutani's first movie, Weather Woman was one of the most surprising successes in Japanese cinema of the 1990s. Based on a popular adult manga which had been made into an anime series, Weather Report Girl, the movie tells the story of a woman who becomes a phenomenally successful TV weatherwoman by exposing her panties on the air. Bandai Home Video financed the film, but, considering it a minor production, released it directly to video in 1995. The video quickly developed a large cult following.

Bandai, mistakenly attributing the video's success to its sexual content, produced a sequel which emphasized the sex and concentrated less on the storyline and dark humor of the original. After reading the script, Mizutani refused to appear in the sequel, which proved to be a failure. However the reputation of the original video continued to grow. It won both the Oslo Film Festival and the Stockholm International Film Festival in 1996. Bandai responded by pulling the original video from the market and releasing the film theatrically.

After its August 16, 1996 theatrical debut, Weather Woman became one of the most successful releases of the year in Japan. Besides its popularity with audiences, the critics also praised the film, and several put it on their top 10 lists for 1996. Kinema Jumpo named the film #26 for the year. In 1997, a television series based on the movie was produced for Asahi TV Network.

=== After Weather Woman ===
Following in the rise of her Weather Woman popularity, Mizutani recorded a CD single in 1996 entitled He Loves Me (ヒー・ラヴズ・ミー). In 1998, she played the role of Shelinda, a villain on the Super Sentai show Seijuu Sentai Gingaman, which was adapted in North America as Power Rangers: Lost Galaxy. In July 2000, she was a guest at San Diego Comic-Con, where the English version of Weather Woman received its premier.

== Filmography ==
- Weather Woman (お天気お姉さん - Otenki Oneisan) (April 25, 1995(V), theatrical release September 21, 1996)
- Slave to Dirty Killing (水谷ケイ 淫殺の虜 - Mizutani Kei: Insatsu no Toriko) (September 20, 1995), released in the English market as "Terminatrix"
- New Dokudami Apartment (新・どくだみ荘 - Shin Dokudami So) (May 21, 1995)
- The Playboy (濡れ事師 - Nuregotoshi) (October 6, 1995)
- Image Club War, Pussy of the Angel (イメクラ戦争 天使のすまた - Imekura Senso, Tenshi no Sumata) (November 10, 1995)
- Bad Girl Teacher (スケバン女教師 - Sukeban Jokyoshi) (February 9, 1996)
- Sumo Vixens (花のおんな相撲 - Hana no Onna Sumo) (February 22, 1996)
- Heisei Dirty Teacher (平成ハレンチ学園 - Heisei Harenchi Gakuen) (February 2, 1995)
- Bewitching Kei, the Material Girl (Youjo Kei - Matiriaru Garu) (1995)
- Edo Period Rapeman (大江戸レイプマン - O-Edo Reipu Man) (July 26, 1996)
- Sex Boy No. 2 (Otoko Gui No. 2)
- The Female Pet (女飼い - Onna Gai) (September 7, 1996)
- The Story of Ms. Q (Q嬢の物語 - Q Jo No Monogatari) (September 21, 1996)
- Tonight Is Good (今夜も絶好調！ - Konya Mo Zekkoucho) (February 28, 1997)
- Ass Girl (尻GIRL - Shiri Garu) (May 21, 1996)
- Tokyo Decameron (東京デカメロン) (July 21, 1996)
- New Female Teacher - Leotards of Temptation) (新任女教師 誘惑のレオタード - Shinnin Jokyoshi - Yuuwaku No Reotado) (May 22, 1997)
- ''Lovely Angel 2 (Raburii Enjuru 2) (1997)
- No Mercy Guard Dog (非常番犬 けだもの - Hijyo Banken Kedamono) (January 23, 1998)
- Tokyo Playboy Who Makes the Girls Crazy (東京ジゴロ とり憑かれた女たち - Tokyo Jigoro Toritsukareta Onnatachi) (March 27, 1998)
- Ecstacy Special - New Female Teacher (Ekusatashui Special - Shinnin Onna Kyoshi)
- Arei: New Wave Outlaw Story (アレイ - Arei) (February 21, 1999)
- True Record of an Ando Gang Side-Story: Starving Wolf's Rules (実録・安藤組外伝 餓狼の掟 - Jitsuroku Andô-gumi gaiden: Garô no okite) (April 13, 2002)
- Flower and Snake 3 (花と蛇3, Hana to hebi 3) (August 28, 2010)

== Bibliography ==
- Glick, Stan (2003). "Sumo Vixens/Terminatrix/Kei Mizutani-Undressed for Success: Reviews". Asian Cult Cinema. 38 (1st Quarter): 39–42.
- Kei Mizutani at IMDb
- Kei Mizutani at nytimes.com
- "Kei Mizutani: Queen of Sex, Sumo, and Softcore" in She magazine, Vol.2, #13, p. 3–11.
- "KEI MIZUTANI". The Complete Index to World Film.
- Luster, Joseph. "Undressed For Success (DVD review)". www.kfccinema.com. Archived from the original on 2009-03-26.
- "水谷ケイ (Mizutani Kei)" (in Japanese). Japanese Movie Database.
- "水谷 ケイ - Mizutani Kei". 'Web I-dic' (Idol Dictionary) (in Japanese). Archived from the original on 2014-01-07.
- Ramone, Mikey (July 2000). "The Ladies Phone Sex Club (DVD review)". Adult Video News. Archived from the original on 2016-03-03.
- Sullivan, David (August 2001). "Kei Mizutani (DVD review)". Adult Video News. Archived from the original on 2016-03-03.
- Sullivan, David (August 2001). "Sumo Vixens (DVD review)". Adult Video News. Archived from the original on 2016-03-03.
- Weisser, Thomas; Yuko Mihara Weisser (1998). Japanese Cinema Encyclopedia: The Sex Films. Miami: Vital Books : Asian Cult Cinema Publications. pp. 492–493. ISBN 1-889288-52-7.
