= Suzuko no Koi =

- Written by: Shizuka Oishi
- Starring: Kurara Emi; Yuko Asano; Tsurutaro Kataoka
- Country of origin: Japan
- Original language: Japanese

Production
- Running time: 30 minutes
- Production companies: Tōkai Television Broadcasting; Kyodo Television

Original release
- Network: FNS (THK, Fuji TV)
- Release: 5 January – 30 March 2012

Suzuko no Koi (鈴子の恋) is a Japanese biographical television drama series that aired on Fuji TV.

== Cast ==
- Kurara Emi as Chōchō Miyako
- Yuko Asano as Saki Hyuga
- Kana Mikura as Miss Wakana
- Satoshi Jinbo as Ryushi Sanyutei
- Yumi Takigawa as Hana Saito
- Kazuma Sano as Haruo
- Kazuko Kato as Sei Yoshimura
- Tsurutaro Kataoka as Eijiro Hyuga
- Mitsuho Otani as Natsuko
- Takayuki Godai as Hanamaru
