= Weather Woman =

Japanese manga series

- First tankōbon volume cover

お天気お姉さん (Otenki Onēsan)
- Genre: Sex comedy, yuri
- Manga
- Written by: Tetsu Adachi
- Published by: Kodansha
- English publisher: NA: CPM Manga
- Magazine: Weekly Young Magazine
- Original run: 1992 – 1994
- Volumes: 8
- Original video animation

Weather Report Girl
- Directed by: Kunihiko Yuyama
- Written by: Kunihiko Yuyama
- Studio: Pastel
- Licensed by: NA: Critical Mass
- Released: 1994 – 1995
- Runtime: 45 minutes (each)
- Episodes: 2
- Live-action film
- Directed by: Tomoaki Hosoyama
- Produced by: Atsuhito Kaji
- Written by: Tomoaki Hosoyama
- Studio: Bandai Visual/TFC
- Licensed by: NA: Central Park Media
- Released: April 25, 1995
- Runtime: 84 minutes
- Live-action film

Weather Woman Returns
- Directed by: Tomoaki Hosoyama
- Written by: Tomoaki Hosoyama
- Music by: Kunihiko Ida
- Studio: Bandai Visual/TFC
- Licensed by: NA: Central Park Media
- Released: January 25, 1996
- Runtime: 84 minutes
- icon

Weather Woman (Japanese: お天気お姉さん, Hepburn: Otenki Onēsan), also known as Weather Report Girl, is a Japanese manga series written and illustrated by Tetsu Adachi. It was serialized in Kodansha's seinen manga magazine Weekly Young Magazine from 1992 to 1994, with its chapters collected in eight tankōbon volumes. A two-episode original video animation (OVA) adaptation produced by OB Planning and Toho and animated by Pastel was released in 1995–96. Two direct-to-video films were released in 1995 and 1996, respectively; the first film had a theatrical release later in Japan in 1996. Both the manga and the live-action films were licensed in North America by Central Park Media, while the OVA was licensed by Right Stuf's division Critical Mass Video.

== Plot ==
The story revolves around Keiko Nakadai, who in the beginning is an office lady working at the perpetually last-place ATV television network. However, she is chosen to fill in for weather reporter Michiko Kawai for one night, and Keiko takes full advantage of her opportunity by blatantly flashing her panties while on live television. The incident causes the evening news ratings to jump, and because of ATV's desperation to escape the ratings cellar, Keiko is subsequently promoted to full-time weather reporter, displacing Michiko in the process. The rest of the series focuses on her rivalries with co-workers jealous of and insulted by the nature of her success.

The series' humor is full of sexually oriented sorority style humor, aimed primarily at young men. The protagonist, Keiko, is depicted as being exhibitionistic, first using her sex appeal to rise to the position of weather girl by flashing her bra and panties, and maintaining her position by frequently wearing lingerie while on the air. She is also very resourceful, always one step ahead of her rivals' various revenge schemes. Keiko is also extraordinarily vengeful, humiliating Michiko on the air by spiking her tea with laxatives after Michiko had attempted a similar tactic against her. Keiko proceeds to masturbate in her apartment while watching Michiko embarrass herself on television. Finally, she is sexually domineering, effectively enslaving Michiko—who due to the on-air incident would have been fired had she not agreed—by making her lick her lingerie and perform cunnilingus on Keiko.

The second episode introduces Kaori Shimamori, a reporter who uses her dad's position as a member of the Diet at Keiko's expense. Kaori conspires to have Keiko demoted after allotting her weather corner during a breaking news report. This effort fails after being flooded with viewer mail protests. Soon after, Keiko and Kaori agree to partner up on a marketing campaign for ATV, though still plotting revenge against Keiko by eavesdropping on her. She soon discovers Keiko's dominatrix relationship with Michiko and becomes friends with Keiko. The OVA ends with a stripping and humiliation of Michiko in which Kaori embraces Keiko's lifestyle and then proceeds to entice Michiko into having oral sex with her while Keiko, half asleep, listens with a smirk.

== Media ==
=== Manga ===
Written and illustrated by Tetsu Adachi, Weather Woman was serialized in Kodansha's seinen manga magazine Weekly Young Magazine from 1992 to 1994. Kodansha collected its chapters in eight tankōbon volumes, released from September 5, 1992, to August 5, 1994.

In North America, the manga was licensed by CPM Manga. It was released in eight issues from August 31, 2000, to March 31, 2001. A collected volume was released on January 23, 2002.

=== Original video animation ===
A two-episode original video animation (OVA) adaptation of 45 minute each, Weather Report Girl, produced by OB Planning and Toho and animated by Pastel, was released in 1994–95.

In North America, the OVA was released by Right Stuf's division Critical Mass Video on VHS, in Japanese with English subtitles, in 1996. The OVA was later released on both VHS and DVD with an English dub on June 26, 2001.

=== Live-action film ===
Two direct-to-video live-action film adaptations, directed by Tomoaki Hosoyama and starring Kei Mizutani, were produced. The first film was released on April 25, 1995. The film developed a cult following and was released theatrically to popular and critical success on September 21, 1996.

Another film called Weather Woman Returns was released in on January 25, 1996. It is not a sequel to the first movie, rather a new story involving the character Keiko.

Both films were released in North America on VHS and DVD by Central Park Media, under their Asia Pulp Cinema label, in 2000.
