= Mitsuho Otani =

Japanese actress

- 大谷 みつほ
- Born: 23 December 1982 (age 43); Suzuka, Mie, Japan
- Other name: Mittsū
- Occupations: Actress; television personality; model
- Years active: 1997–2019, 2023–present
- Spouse: Unknown (m. 2015)
- Children: 1
- Modeling information
- Height: 159 cm (5 ft 3 in)
- Agency: Sun Music

Mitsuho Otani (大谷 みつほ, 大谷 允保, Ōtani Mitsuho; born 23 December 1982) is a Japanese actress and television personality.

== Career ==
In 1997, she entered the entertainment industry with the Japan Artists Office's "29th Newcomer Presentation", and debuted as the heroine of the 1998 television drama Athena (TV Tokyo, late nights). After the same work, her artist name became Mitsuho Otani (大谷 みつほ; in hiragana). After that, she works extensively with television, advertising, films, stage, gravure, etc. From 2003, she returned her stage name to her real name, (大谷 允保; in kanji). Her nickname is "Mittsū" (みっつぅー). Her older brother is Arm Wrestling All Japan Champion Masahiro Otani.

She announced that she left Sun Music at the end of 2008 at her own blog Teni Muhō on 1 January 2009 (1 January 2009 – paused until 23 April 2009, 24 April 2009 – continued until 19 July 2009, afterwards "Teni Muhō" ended.)

Her comments (backyard story) were posted on the memorial article of Miyuki Kanbe who died suddenly on 18 June 2008. She co-starred with Kanbe in "Momo no Tennensui" (2000) and "Kyoto Chiken no Onna (3)" (2006), Kanbe said that Otani was "a cool woman."

From 2012, she transferred to Fujiga Office and returned to her stage name (大谷 みつほ) to resume activities.

She is previously represented with Fujiga Office. Since 1 April 2023, she is currently represented with Sun Music.

== Personal life ==
She was born from Suzuka, Mie and graduated from Horikoshi High School.

She obtained the 2008 Vegetable Sommelier and the 2009 Mental Psychology Counselor Qualification.

On 16 April 2014 her official blog "Otani-san" restarted.

It was reported that she was married on her official blog on 23 February 2015.

On 30 July 2018, she gave birth to her first child. On 31 January 2019, she left Fujiga Office and taking a break from entertainment activities to focus on raising her children.

She made a comeback to the entertainment industry on 1 April 2023 when she returned to her previous agency, Sun Music.

== Filmography ==
=== TV dramas ===
==== NHK General TV ====
- Okami ni narimasu (2003)
- Tensai Terebi-kun Tentere Drama Shōnen Keiji Suiri-kun (2005)
- Mei Tantei Akafuji Taka "ABC Satsujin Jiken"
- Doyō Drama
  - Tama Moe! (2006)
  - Hitogata Nagashi (2007) – as new announcer: Kaori Otani
  - Kansa Hōjin (2008) – as Kasumi Yoshida
- TV 60-nen Multi-channel Drama Hōsō Hakubutsukan Kikiippatsu (2013) – as Nanami Suzukawa

==== Nippon TV ====
- Kayō Suspense Gekijō
  - Tōban Bengoshi (8) (1999) – as Yoko Kajiwara
  - Kodokuna Kajitsu (2000) – as Mika Awano
  - Kinkyū Kyūmei Byōin (1) (2001) – as Mizuki Takada
  - Keishichō Kanshikihan (2002)
- Densetsu no Kyōshi (2000)
- Shinjuku Bōsō Kyūkyū-tai Episode 4 "Food Poisoning Big Panic! Killing Alumni Association!!" (2000) – as Junko Ochiai
- Shijō Saiaku no Date Episode 7 "There is No Toilet!" (2000) – as Reiko
- Tantei Kazoku (2002) – Episode 5 "Kidnapping Incident!? Genius Boy Name Detective Birth! My Wife is Not a Housekeeper" – as Aoi Sato
- Nurse Man Special (2004)
- Kayō Drama Gold Hei no Naka no Korinai Onna-tachi 2 (2006) as Yuki Ninomiya
- Nipponshi Suspense Gekijō Saigen Drama (15 Oct 2008) – as Oeyo
- Nipponshi Suspense Gekijō Tokubetsu Kikaku Tōdai Rakujō (14 Jan 2009) – as Tomoko Abe

==== Tokyo Broadcasting System Television ====
- Getsuyō Mystery Gekijō Manbiki G-Men Yuki Nikaido (7) (2001)
- Morning Musume Suspense Drama Special Mikeneko Homes no Hanzai-gaku Kōza (2002)
- Ai no Gekijō Yoiko no Mikata (2004) – as Moe Tachikawa
- Getsuyō Mystery Gekijō
  - Tax Inspector Madogiwa Taro: Case File 12 (10 Jan 2005) – as Miki Tachibana
  - Hideo Yokoyama Mystery Neta-moto (2005) – as Kano
- Suiyō Premier Yaoh (2005) – as Erika
- Mikka Okure no Happy New Year! (2007) – as Ayaka Yagi
- Usagi ga mochi-tsuki (BS-TBS, 2007) – as Naoko Majima
- Usagi-tachi no mochi-tsuki (BS-TBS, 2008) – as Naoko Majima
- Hanzawa Naoki Episode 2 (2013)

==== Fuji Television ====
- Hanamura Daisuke Episode 5 "2 Billion Heritage Please Give Me" (KTV, 2000) – as Rina Morishita
- Rookie! (KTV, 2001)
- Kinyō Entertainment Hama no Shizuka wa Jiken ga Osuki Episode 4 (2006) – as Former student of Shizuka: Rina
- Oniyome Nikki Īyudana Episode 11 "What is Wrong with Demon Bride" (KTV, 2007) – as Emi
- Team Batista no Eikō Episode 4 (KTV, 2008) – as Taeko Kawakami
- Suzuko no Koi (THK, 2012) – as Natsuko
- Kyūmei Byōtō 24-ji Episode 2 (2013)
- Dr. Kenji Morohashi 2 (2014) – as Tomoko Ochiai
- Hottokenai Majo-tachi (THK, 2014) – as Yukari Okabe
- Love Love Alien Episode 27 (22 Sep 2016) – as Beauty salon customer
- Kirawa reru Yūki (2017) – as Maho Tamura
- Kinyō Premium Hanji Shikkaku!? Bengoshi Rentaro Natsume no Gyakuten Sōsa (24 Mar 2017) – as Manami Yamashina

==== TV Asahi ====
- Change! (ABC, 1999)
- Oyaji Tantei 1st Series (Mokuyō Mystery, 2001)
- Seicho Matsumoto Botsugo 10 Nenkinen Chō Komi (2 Mar 2002) – as Yuzuki (protagonist)'s daughter
- Shopping Hero (2002)
- Omiyasan 2nd Series File No.02 (2003) – Guest
- Shin Kyoto Meikyūan Nai 2 Episode 5 (2004) – Guest
- Yonaoshi Junan! Ninjōken (Getsuyō Jidaigeki, 2005)
- Keiji Heya Episode 7 (2005) – as Detective of the Boys' Chief: Miho
- Kyoto Chiken no Onna Dai 3 Series (2006) – as Judicial Student: Nana Kagizaki
- Taikō-ki – Tenka o Totta Otoko Hideyoshi (2006) – as Asahi
- Tokumei Kakarichō Hitoshi Tadano 3rd Season Episode 25 (2007) – Guest
- Aibō
  - (2007) – as Kanako Soejima
  - (2016) – Sakurako Oda
- Keishichō Sōsaikka 9 Kakari season 7 Episode 4 (25 Jul 2012) – as Eri Yoshinaga
- Yuri Chika e Mama kara no Dengon (NBN, 26 Jan 2013)
- Kyoto Ninjō Sōsa File Episode 3 (14 May 2015)
- Keishichō Sōsaikkachō Final Episode (23 Jun 2016) – as Mizuho Ota
- Iryū Sōsa (2017) – as Toko Shida
- Doyō Wide Gekijō
  - Jikkyō chūkei sa reta Renzoku Satsujin! Nozoku Onna (2002)
  - Kurumaisu no Bengoshi Takeshi Mizushima Watashi wa Mizushima no Musumedesu! Satsujin Yōgi-sha no Joshidai-sei ga Igaina Kokuhaku! (26 Oct 2002) – as Atsuko Hirose
  - Keiji no Tsuma – Dekatsuma
    - Miwaku no Kurokami Renzoku Satsujin Otto ni Taiho sa reta Kyōaku-han ga Shussho shita! Fukushū ka? Tsuma o Nerau Ayashī Kage... (30 Jul 2005) – as Emi Mitsui
    - Tsumanouwaki Check ga Furin Renzoku Satsujin o Yobu! Watashi no Otto ga Hannin nante... Zettaizetsumei no Tsuma ga Saigonokake (8 Aug 2009) – as Emi Mitsui
  - Onsenwaka okami no Satsujin Suiri
    - (18) Izumo – Tamatsukurionsen, Emmusubi Renzoku Satsujin!! Daikyō o mi kuji ga Jiken o Yobu!? (14 Jan 2007) – as Chika Takano
    - (27) Shikoku Kagawa – Shoya ni Korosa reta Seto no Hanayome (1 Mar 2014) – as Mako Kudo
  - Kyoto Minami-sho Kanshiki File Shinise Ryōtei – Misshitsu Renzoku Satsujin!! (25 Jul 2009) – as Manami Sone
  - Kenji Yoko Asahina (13) Hannin ga Gyōretsu suru Ropeway, Hyōkō 932 m Satsujin Trick… (9 Mar 2013) – as Yuko Tajima
  - Otorisōsa-kan Shiho Kitami (18) Kōfuku no Zetchō Bijo Renzoku Satsujin! (5 Apr 2014) – as Masumi Nakane
  - Shūchakueki no Ushio Keiji vs Jiken Kisha Saeko (14) Mochū Ketsurei (27 Dec 2014) – as Eri Asakura

==== TV Tokyo ====
- Athena (1998)
- Onna to Ai to Mystery Yame Ken Bengoshi Hidetake Choku Sadogashima Satsujin Kō (28 Jul 2002) – as Emari
- Seiichi Morimura Mystery Onna to Ai to Mystery Sōsasenjō no Aria (2003)
- Vampire Host Episode 5 (2004) – as Hitomi Kurusu
- The Great Horror Family (2004)
- Uramiya Honpo Episode 8 (2006) – as Yayoi Ono
- Suiyō Mystery 9
  - Ginza Kōkyū Club Mama Miyuki Aoyama Nyotei Battle Satsujin Chōbo (2006)
  - Kita Alps Sangaku Kyūjotai Ikki Shimon (10) Hakuba Karamatsudake Satsujin Route (Mar 2008) – as Shizuko Makimura
  - Sōgi-ya Matsuko no Jiken-bo (4) (12 Mar 2014) – as Aki Hayashiba
- Rambling Fish (2006, KBS) – as Reiko Okajima
- Elite Yankee Saburō (2007) – as Midori

==== Others ====
- Dunichi Love (2003) – Episode 5 "On the Weekend, Saigo-san." – as Flower shop clerk: Kiyoko

=== Films ===
- Eko Eko Azarak (2001)
- Hashire! Ichirō (2001, Toei Company) – as Mariko Yoshimura
- Tenshi ga Orita Hi Dai 3-wa "Tenshi no Countdown"
- Gun Crazy 3: Traitor's Rhapsody (2003)
- Shūdan Satsujin Club Returns (2003) – as Mihoko
- Hayate -Basement Fight- (2004)
- Mail in the site (2004)
- Usagi no mochi-tsuki (2004) – as Naoko Majima
- Kuinige Couple Jigoku no Tōsō 5 Man Kilo (2004, NetCinema.TV) – as Kyoko
- Usagi no mochi-tsuki 2 (2005) – as Naoko Majima
- Cool Dimension (2006)
- Usagi-tachi no mochi-tsuki (2008, NetCinema.TV) – as Naoko Majima
- Orite yuku Ikikata (2009) – as Maiko Ishihara

=== Direct-to-video ===
- Chance Meeting (Nov 2003, Bunkasha)
- Minami no Teiō Special Ver.50 Gekijō-ban "Kanekashi no Okite" (2004, KSS) – as Hostess: Mayumi

=== Stage ===
- Musical Shōkōshi Cedy
- Takuramakan '05 (7–12 Jun 2005, Nakano The Pocket)
- Takuramakan '06 (Production: Screenwriter Takehiko Hata, 17–19 Aug 2006, Sapporo Kaoru 2.7 Hall/21–22 Aug, Furano Plays Factory) – Lead role: as Kei

=== Advertisements ===
- Toyota Tercel Corsa Corolla II Special Car (1998)
- Sato Foods
- Unicharm
- Momo no Tennensui (Japan Tobacco)
- Esprique Precious (KOSÉ, interlocked with the drama "Mikka Okure no Happy New Year!")

=== Others ===
- Warauinu no Bōken (CX)
- Odoru! Sanma Goden!! (NTV – Guest
- Shinnosuke Furumoto Cha para suka Woo! (NCB)
- Tokyo Disney Sea 5th Anniversary Web Cinema "Sea of Dreams" Episode 2 Subarashiki Hanaji Biyori – as Maya
- V6 Special DVD Sorezore no Sora -Drama Story Clip- (2007, Avex Entertainment)
- Access no Daishō –Anata no Shiranai Net no Uragawa– (Japan Police Support Association)

== Released works ==
=== Photo albums ===
- virgin (Nov 2000, Shooting: Toshiaki Matsugi, Gakken)
- Honey (Nov 2002, Shooting: Yoshinobu Nemoto, Kindaieigasha)
- Soul (Apr 2003, Shooting: Tetsuo Nogami, Pioneer LDC) – Film Gun Crazy photo album
- Chance Meeting (Oct 2003, Shooting: Hide T. Shimazaki, Bunkasha)
- Mitsuho Otani (Mar 2004, Shooting: Hidekazu Maiyama, Wani Books)

=== DVD ===
- Junkie (26 Jul 2002 (VHS)/2 Aug 2002 (DVD), DooGA)
- Mitsuho Otani in Gun Crazy/Soul (25 Apr 2003, Geneon Entertainment) – Gun Crazy making DVD
- Baby Blue (25 Apr 2014, Takeshobo)

Omnibus

- Kasumi Nakane & Mitsuho Otani in Gun Crazy/Passion & Soul (Sep 2003, Geneon Entertainment)
