= Gun Crazy: A Woman from Nowhere =

- Directed by: Atsushi Muroga
- Starring: Ryoko Yonekura; Shingo Tsurumi
- Distributed by: ADV Films
- Release date: 2002
- Running time: 70 minutes
- Country: Japan
- Language: Japanese

Gun Crazy: A Woman from Nowhere (復讐の荒野) is a 2002 Japanese action film, which was directed by Atsushi Muroga. It starred Ryoko Yonekura and Shingo Tsurumi. It is part of the girls with guns genre. The success of the film inspired "not a series of sequels, but a series of episodes, not much longer than an hour, featuring different casts, all released as direct-to-video."

== Cast ==
- Ryoko Yonekura
- Shingo Tsurumi

== Other "episodes" ==
The second "episode", Gun Crazy 2: Beyond the Law (裏切りの挽歌), starring Rei Kikukawa, was also released in 2002.
