= Juri Miyazawa =

Japanese actress and gravure idol

- 宮澤 寿梨
- Born: April 25, 1980 (age 45); Ueda, Nagano Prefecture, Japan
- Occupation: Actress
- Years active: 1993 - 2007

Juri Miyazawa (宮澤 寿梨, Miyazawa Juri; born April 25, 1980, in Ueda, Nagano Prefecture, Japan) is a Japanese actress and gravure idol who is affiliated with ABC Project. She graduated from Sunrise Women Gakuen High School.

== Personal life ==
She retired from entertainment industry in 2007 to taking care of her grandmother who is having a stroke.

== Filmography ==
=== TV series ===
Year	Title	Role	Network	Other notes
1996	Hen	Hayaeina Suzuki	TV Asahi	
1998	Seijuu Sentai Gingaman	Saya / Ginga Pink (Entire series); Misaki Hoshino (Double-role, one episode only)	TV Asahi	
1999	Tantei Knight Scoop		ABC TV	
