= Atsushi Muroga =

Japanese film director

- Born: 18 May 1964; Osaka Prefecture
- Occupations: Film director; screenwriter
- Years active: 1990–present

Atsushi Muroga (室賀厚, Muroga Atsushi; born 18 May 1964) is a Japanese film director and screenwriter. He is known for his action and yakuza films, including Score (1995), Junk (2000), and the Gun Crazy series (2002–03), as well as for directing Wangan Midnight: The Movie (2009), a film adaptation of the manga series of the same name.

== Early life and education ==
Muroga was born on 18 May 1964 in Osaka Prefecture, Japan. He attended the School of Commerce at Meiji University.

== Career ==
In 1987, Muroga's independently produced work HELP ME! won the Grand Prix at the Business Jump Video Awards sponsored by Shueisha. He made his directorial debut with the direct-to-video film Blowback: Midnight Gangsters (1990), followed by Blowback 2 (1991). His first theatrically released film was the action film Score (1995), distributed by Shochiku. In 2000, Muroga wrote and directed the zombie film Junk.

== Selected filmography ==
Year	Film	Director	Writer	Notes	Ref(s)
1990	Blowback: Midnight Gangsters	Yes		Direct-to-video film	
1991	Blowback 2	Yes			
1995	Score	Yes	Yes		
1998	Rokudenashi Blues '98	Yes			
2000	Junk	Yes	Yes		
2002	Gun Crazy: Episode 1 – A Woman from Nowhere	Yes	Yes		
2002	Gun Crazy: Episode 2 – Beyond the Law	Yes	Yes		
2003	Gun Crazy 3: Traitor's Rhapsody	Yes	Yes		
2003	Gun Crazy 4: Requiem for a Bodyguard	Yes	Yes		
2007	Captain	Yes			
2008	Super Cub	Yes	Yes		
2009	Wangan Midnight: The Movie	Yes	Yes		
2013	June 6	Yes	Yes	Segment: "Kill Pigs"	
2016	I Want to Take Revenge	Yes	Yes		
