= Pornography in Japan =

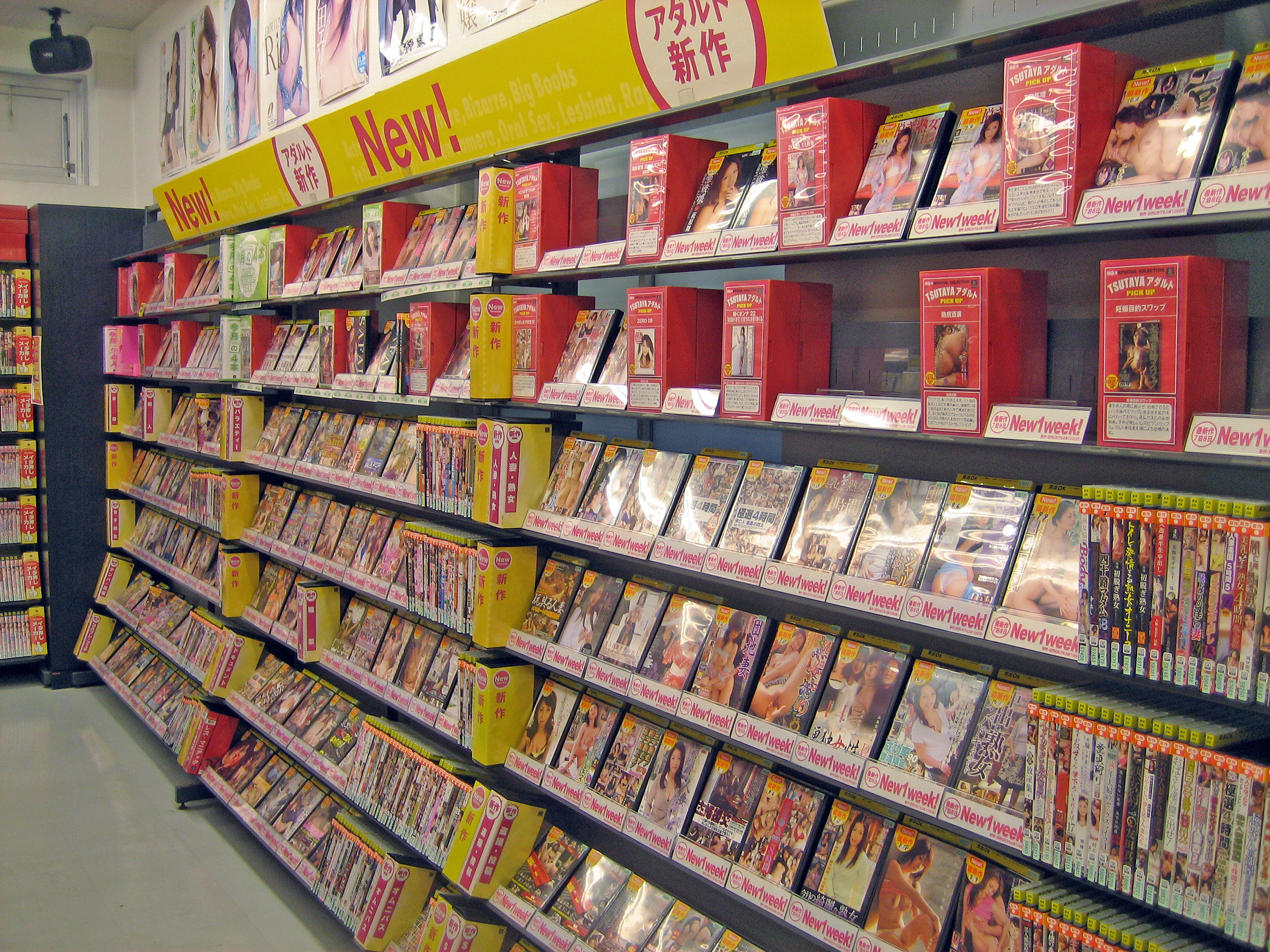
Adult videos in a Japanese rental shop, 2008

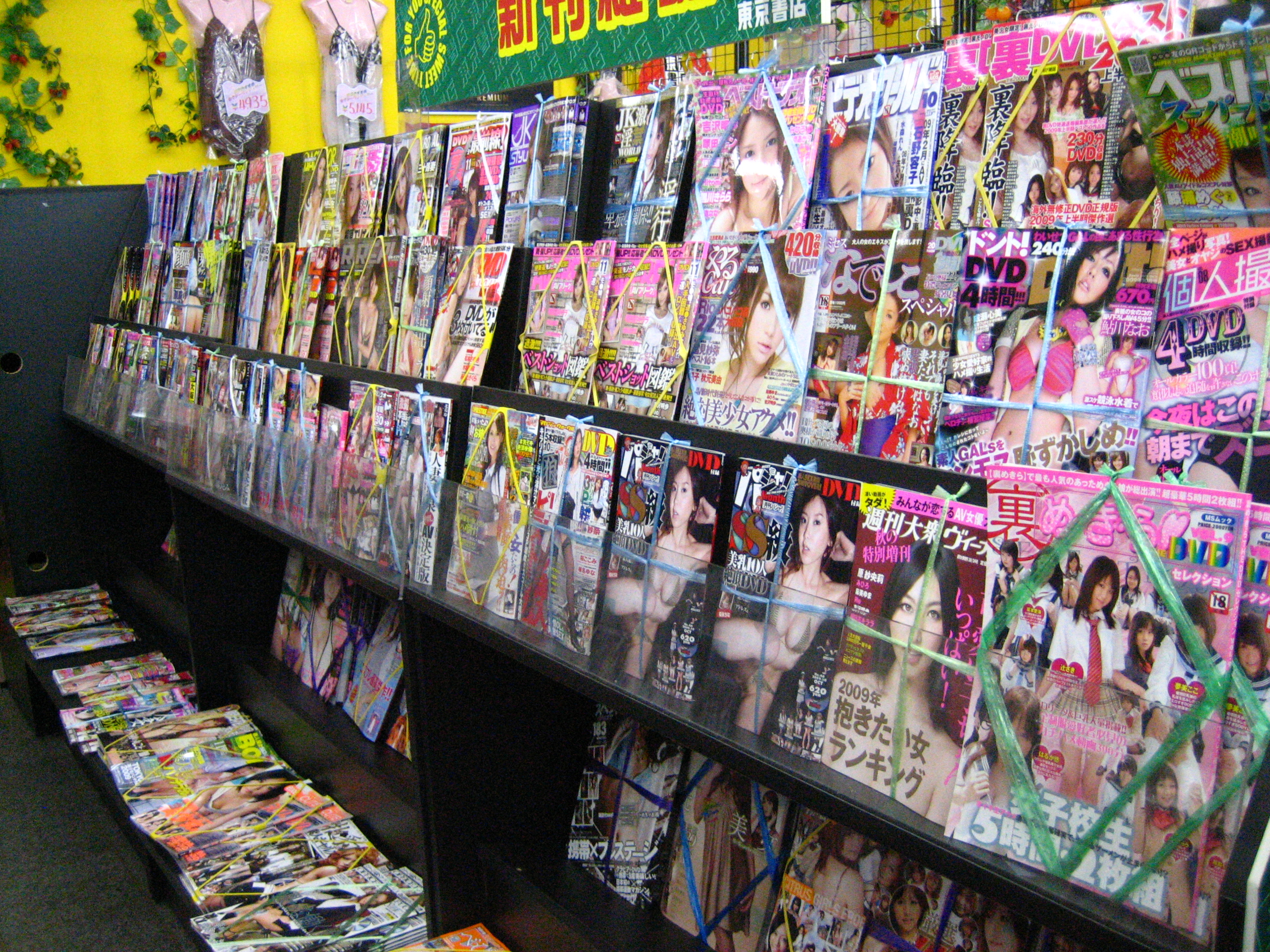
Pornographic magazines on shelves in Japan, 2009

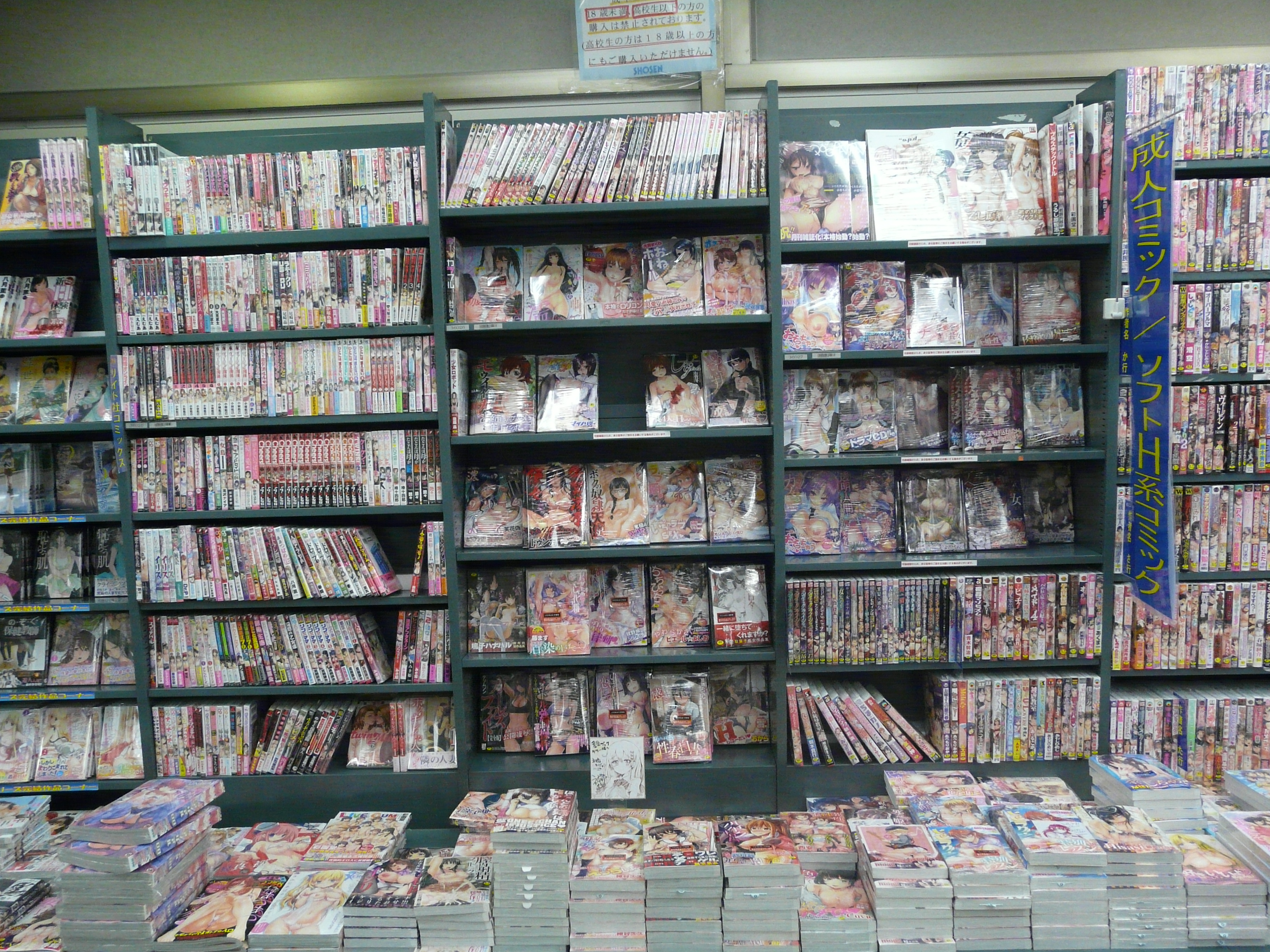
Hentai manga in Japan, 2014

In Japan, pornography has unique characteristics that readily distinguish it from western pornography. Pornographic films are known as "adult videos" (AV) in Japan, so Japanese adult videos (JAV) refers to the Japanese Adult Video industry. Animated films are referred to as hentai in English, but in Japan the terms "adult anime" and "erotic animation" (or ero anime) are used. In addition to pornographic videos and magazines featuring live actors, there are now categories of pornographic manga and anime (Note: animated depictions of sexual activity) (i.e., hentai), and pornographic computer games (eroge; for both PC and game consoles).

Reflecting Japan's views on sexuality and culture, Japanese pornography delves into a wide spectrum of heterosexual, homosexual, and transgender sexual acts in addition to unique fetishes and paraphilias. Starting with erotic stories and wood block prints from before the 20th century, Japanese pornography evolved into distinct subcategories. Partly under attempts to circumvent Japanese laws regarding censorship, but also to cater to particular fetishes, actors and producers often feature subject matter that in western pornography had historically been unseen or rarely depicted, and even now is less frequently featured; bukkake (group ejaculation), gokkun (consuming semen), omorashi (needing to urinate), and tentacle erotica are a few uniquely Japanese genres of erotica. Lolicon (young girls), shotacon (young boys), and their contribution to the controversy regarding the regulation of cartoon pornography depicting minors have been a major issue concerning child protection, free speech, and public morality both inside and outside Japan.

The Penal Code of Japan from the early 20th century has provisions against indecent material, so any lawfully produced pornography must censor the genitals of actors and actresses; this type of censorship also extends to the graphics of hentai manga, video games, and anime. Up until the mid-1990s, any depiction of pubic hair was also censored. Anuses are only censored at contact or penetration.

== History ==
=== Before the 20th century ===
Shunga or pornographic wood-block pictures were printed with all imaginable situations. The actual uses of shunga in the period are still debated, but probably resembled modern uses of pornographic materials, including masturbation and shared viewing with a lover. Several notable woodblock artists who produced shunga included Hokusai and Kitagawa Utamaro. Their works included Hokusai's The Dream of the Fisherman's Wife, Lesbian and Two Lovers, as well as Utamaro's Client Lubricating a Prostitute. One of the best-known collections of Shunga can be seen in Kunisada's 1850 work A Bedside Guide to the Colours of Love in Spring.

After the Meiji Restoration in the second half of the 19th century, the publication of shunga declined under government pressure.

=== In the 20th century ===
In the late Taishō era and early Shōwa era, an artistic movement called Eroguronansensu, literally "erotic-grotesque-nonsense", emerged under the influence of decadent European works. Open sexual expressions were permitted in novels and manga but a strict control was applied on photographs and films. After World War II, the law against 'obscenity', Article 175, was the only official censorship law that remained in force. During the Allied occupation of Japan, which lasted until 1952, all forms of sexually explicit material were prohibited in the country. American forces occupying Japan imposed Western ideas of morality and law. The Japanese public slowly came to adopt some of these ideas and practices. Negative views about pornography that were foreign to Japanese culture were accepted and applied to visual depictions as they were the ones most likely recognized and thereby criticized by Westerners. As a result, once the occupation forces left, the Japanese government kept the ban on sexually explicit material in place until the late 1980s; images or depictions of frontal nudity were banned, as well as pictures of pubic hair or genitals. No sex act could be depicted graphically. Sex work was outlawed in Japan in 1958.

Influenced by magazines such as Playboy, pornographic magazines were printed soon after World War II. Playboy's articles being about American lifestyle, women being mostly non-Asian, interviews being with people largely unknown in Japan, and fashion and sport being American spawned a fashion for a genre known as yōmono (literally "Western things").

In the early 1960s, several movie studios began producing "pink films". With censorship laws prohibiting genitals from being seen but otherwise free to express anything, these movies quickly diversified to cover all genres, including rape and bondage. Throughout the 1960s, the "pink films" were mainly produced by low-budget, independent filmmakers such as Kōji Wakamatsu. In 1971, the major studio Nikkatsu entered the pink film genre. Starting in 1971, homosexually-oriented magazines began to appear, including Barazoku. Homosexual magazines tend to feature particular body types, such as Badi (younger adult males), Samson (chubby men) and G-men (muscular men).

The 1976 Japanese love film In the Realm of the Senses by Nagisa Ōshima was banned from Japan due to its nudity and erotic content. Despite quickly becoming a sensation at film festivals in New York and Cannes, in October 1976 the film was seized by Japanese authorities. While the film was based on a true story well known in Japan, its content, involving the vivid depiction of erotic asphyxiation, was considered too obscene for public viewing. The producer and script writer for the film were taken to court and charged with obscenity but were found not guilty. Frontal nudity was not permitted to appear on film in Japan until 1986.

==== 1980s ====
The proliferation of pornographic videos in the 1980s commonly called A/V (short for adult video) arose as most Japanese families now had at least two television sets and VCRs. It is rumored, but not substantiated, that the VHS format vanquished Betamax because large numbers of A/V were released in VHS format. Few A/Vs were sold in laserdisc format. Playing games on personal computers with no limitation on content except for censorship laws was sometimes viewed as being synonymous with playing bishōjo games, because so few Japanese people saw any reason to play video games on these platforms, as opposed to video game consoles.

In the late 1980s, the dōjinshi market expanded. It is estimated that about half of this market consists of pornography. Copyright problems plague the market, yet the dōjinshi market was a common place for creators to start before making a debut in a professional magazine. Yaoi began in the dōjinshi market.

==== 1990s ====
According to John Carr, a United Kingdom government adviser on Internet safety policy for children, two-thirds of all pedophilic images on the Internet in the late 1990s may have originated in Japan. Since the law against child pornography in 1999, the proportion is now believed to be less than 2%. ECPAT believes that many child pornography producers have simply turned to producing anime or films featuring adults dressed as children.

=== 21st century ===
During the COVID-19 lockdowns, global viewership for Japanese pornography rose significantly as more people were forced to stay home. The sale of videos, sex toys, and even subtitles rose significantly in sales during this period. At the same time, the use of virtual reality headsets has shot up during this period, mainly due to the increase in available content and faster internet speeds.

With the Japanese pornography industry growing, increasing numbers of women in the country have become victims of sexual exploitation. Many were tricked into believing they were signing up for "modelling contracts", only to be coerced into becoming pornographic actresses. These continued occurrences have led to calls for greater regulation.

In September 2022, one of the largest Japanese adult video distribution websites, R18.com, announced that they would be closing down permanently on 31 January 2023 due to billing issues. The company's Japanese website, DMM.com, will still remain operational, although international payments have been restricted. In June 2022, the Japanese government passed a bill that aims to protect the rights of actors and actresses coerced into the pornography industry. The new set of laws gives people who have agreed to appear in pornographic films the right to terminate their contract at any time prior to and up to one year after the public release of their films without condition. The bill also states that a one-month period must pass between contract-signing and filming, and a four-month period must pass between filming and public release of the film, in order to give actors and actresses time to reconsider their decision. Additionally, the bill highlights a greater need for transparency around the types of sexual acts involved in a film by requiring producers to provide a written explanation of the nature of the content and details of sexual acts involved. Misrepresentation or intimidation to prevent withdrawal of contracts is liable to up to 3 years of imprisonment or 3 million yen for individuals, or 100 million yen for corporations.

== Considerations ==
=== Censorship laws ===
Under Article 175 of the Penal Code of Japan people who sell or distribute obscene materials can be punished by fines or imprisonment. Article 175 was included in the original document in 1907 and remains relatively unchanged. Showing pubic hair and adult genitalia was once considered obscene.

Maebari (literally 'front patch') is a Japanese slang term used in the pornography industry to mean "hiding the pubic hair". Initially this was done by sticking adhesive tape over the crotch, and the term maebari was used for this tape. This technique allowed the film makers to conform with Japanese censorship requirements and avoid the risk of expensive re-shooting. In Japanese pink films these maebari evolved into self-adhesive bandage-like coverings that were discarded after use. They were often skin-coloured and triangular. Once the removal of pubic hair by shaving became popular, maebari fell out of use.

Video pornography routinely depicts explicit sex scenes with the participants' genitalia obscured by pixelization. The amount of censorship of the penis can vary. The publication of Waterfruit and Santa Fe by Kishin Shinoyama was likely the first publication that featured pubic hair. Many video production companies belong to ethical associations which provide guidance on what is acceptable and what is not. The Nihon Ethics of Video Association, the Ethics Organization of Computer Software and the Contents Soft Association are three examples of such organizations.

=== Religion and pornography ===
Japan's indigenous religion, Shinto (Kami-no-Michi), is based on animism, with a belief that supernatural beings dwell in nature. The gods and goddesses of Shinto are not repositories of morality or perfection; instead, they exist within nature and thus, sexuality is an innate part of life itself. Therefore, religious attitudes are no obstacle to the presence of pornographic material in Japan's society.

=== Child pornography ===
Possession of child pornography depicting real children has been illegal in Japan since June 2014. Distribution of child pornography was made de jure illegal in 1999 after international pressure from the United Nations, UNICEF and other international organizations, although the law made a distinction between hardcore pornography and softcore pornography, which is widely available in Japan, such as at junior idol and lolicon media centers like Akihabara and Nipponbashi, and at most konbini, or Japanese convenience stores. Prosecutions have been made under the new law by prosecutors under Japan's unique legal system, resulting in some financial verdicts, with relative strictness of enforcement continuing to vary by prefecture.

In June 2008, a bill that proposed the imposition of a ban on child-pornography possession was submitted to the House of Representatives of Japan where it was brought before the Diet in September, but failed to pass. On 15 July 2014 penalties were added to the simple possession of child pornography as a result of the revision of the law.

=== Sexual assault ===
In 1999, Milton Diamond and Ayako Uchiyama postulated that the rise of pornographic material in Japan from the 1970s onwards creates a decrease in reported violence.

In 2016, the campaign group Human Rights Now reported allegations that some women appearing in pornographic films had been forced to do so against their will. The group called for the introduction of legislation to regulate production companies and for help for any performers who had experienced abuse.

=== Coercion ===
In 2016, Japanese pornographic actress Saki Kozai told AFP, Tokyo that she was tricked into appearing in pornography. She had signed a deal with an agency believing she would be modelling. At the time of the first shoot, she was asked to take off her clothes and have sex in front of the camera. She was surrounded by 20 men and could not say "no" and had to perform the act in front of camera unwillingly. The agency also convinced her to cut herself off from her family to focus on work. Another woman from the pornography industry said that she was tricked into working in pornography by an agency on the pretense of becoming a singer.

In Tokyo, three people were arrested for allegedly forcing a woman to appear in more than 100 pornographic films. Pornography agencies use intimidating tactics when women try to refuse to perform sex acts, such as demanding huge fines, citing vaguely worded contracts, and telling them they will not find a job outside of the pornography industry. Many such women have committed suicide under the high pressure and coercion they face.

=== Depiction of illegal activity ===
Many Japanese-made pornographic films (JAV) have titles that suggest that they use minors, or that they show the recording of another actual crime. However, any and all titles that are circulated with the approval of Eirin, the Japanese film industry's regulatory body, are in full compliance with and do not break any Japanese laws.

A common ploy is to have a part of a title replaced with a character, or to use a phonetically similar neologism.

== Types ==
=== Dōjin and parodies ===
Dōjinshi (often transliterated as doujinshi), or self-published works that are often manga, are frequently (but not always) pornographic, either as original works or as fanfiction based on popular anime, games and manga.

=== Anime ===
Animated erotica (known in the West as hentai but in Japan as "adult anime", "ero anime" or "erotic animation") is a popular genre in Japan and generally maintains the same style of animation seen in other popular forms of Japanese animation (anime).

Used in everyday conversational Japanese, the default meaning of the term hentai is "weird" implying "perverted", i.e., implying that any amount of lewdness is considered "perverted", rather than making a distinction between "normal" and "perverted" erotica.

(Used as a technical term, the word hentai can also mean "metamorphosis"/"transformation", although this denotation does not inform the meaning of the word as it would be commonly used in conversation.)

=== Games ===
Adult-oriented games are a genre for video games in Japan. Because of the language barrier and cultural differences, the genre is less popular outside Japan. Known as bishōjo games or "pretty girl games" (alternately spelled bishoujo), or as eroge in Japanese, the games are known under several names used by English fans, including PC dating-sim game, hentai game/H game, and so on. Companies such as JAST USA and MangaGamer are translating dating sims and visual novels into English for the fledgling market outside Japan. For adult video games in Japan, the rating of "18+" was coined by the Ethics Organization of Computer Software or Contents Soft Association. Rating of adult video games has not gone in Computer Entertainment Rating Organization.

=== The Internet ===
Fan fiction, commonly found in websites, is not limited to fictitious characters and often uses real live people as well, though these works would make little sense to those who do not see Japanese TV programs. Dōjinshi writers typically use the Internet to market their products by offering previews of new works, a secret address where buyers can find additional works, and a sample of their games. They also recruit new writers and artists online. Several exclusively adult oriented search engines exist to let someone find a site they are looking for, without having to search through commercial websites that list all keywords. Many works of dōjinshi are featured in websites that collect the art and let people look for free.

Many websites feature seasonal greeting pictures, often pornographic, from linked sites and friends who frequent their sites. A typical Christmas greeting picture on such sites features a Santa-girl in various stages of undressing. The twelve zodiac animals of Chinese astrology allow for variations on catgirls.

=== Magazines ===
Magazines are, along with videos, popular media for pornographic materials. Magazines that contain pornographic manga or pictures are controlled, and feature age requirements for purchase. Many localities in Japan require pornographic magazines to be sealed when sold outside of adult bookstores, but it is not uncommon to find non-pornographic magazines that feature nudity. Many magazines, especially weekly tabloids, include nude images and photo spreads similar to Page 3 girls featured in many western tabloids. So long as these images do not depict sexual organs or sex acts, they are not considered pornographic and, hence, are freely sold in public.

Confessional writings by both men and women are a popular topic in men's and pornographic magazines.

=== Movie adaptations ===
In August 2019, Netflix released The Naked Director drama depicting the life of a Japanese adult video producer, Toru Muranishi and one of his first casts, Kaoru Kuroki. The drama received worldwide recognition, with a second season released in 2021. Today, Toru Muranishi is known as the "Emperor of Porn" and "the dirtiest of the industry's dirty old men" for being one of the pioneers in the industry.

=== Manga ===
Manga with pornographic content targets both male and female audiences, and both male and female manga artists write pornographic works. Male-oriented pornographic manga is known as eromanga. In Western contexts, this is more commonly referred to as hentai manga.

=== Video (JAV) ===
JAV films are tracked using a studio‑assigned alphanumeric code. It starts with a 3–4‑letter prefix denoting the studio or series (e.g., ONED, PSD, S1), followed by a sequential number (usually three or four digits). Special variants use different prefixes or suffixes (e.g., 5ONE for rentals, ONSD for compilations), and some uncensored titles embed the release date. This system lets producers, databases and collectors index and search titles efficiently.

=== Virtual reality (VR) ===
Virtual reality has risen in popularity in recent years, largely propelled by the pornography industry. Since the start of 2020, virtual reality use for Japanese adult videos has greatly increased, and this is largely attributed to the COVID-19 pandemic and the industry maturing.

== Subgenres ==
Among the various subgenres of Japanese pornography are the following:

- Lolicon (short for "Lolita complex") ロリコン: This genre involves young (or young-looking) girl characters in fiction (anime and manga).
- Shotacon (short for "Shoutarou Complex"): Similar to lolicon, this genre involves young (or young-looking) boy characters in fiction (anime and manga).
- Yaoi ("Boy's Love"): Featuring two boys or men in a homosexual/gay relationship. Target audience is mainly (but not limited to) young adult women. It typically features a feminine 'uke' or submissive/bottom, and a masculine 'seme' or dominant/top, however this is not always the case as 'uke' is often portrayed as masculine as well.
- Geikomi (sometimes "Bara"): Manga made by and for gay men that are often pornographic. Typically features adult men with varying degrees of muscle, body fat, and body hair, akin to beefcake or bears. Geikomi can focus on the more realistic obstacles and challenges that come with being gay in Japan.
- Yuri ("Girl's Love"): Featuring two grown adult women in a homosexual/lesbian relationship. The target audience are mostly men or lesbians, but it is much less popular than Yaoi.
- Pornography for women: a new subgenre targeting women, portraying "eromen" (erotic men) who cater to women's needs.

== Genres ==
- Bukkake
- Cuckold
- Futanari
- Gokkun
- Group sex
  - Gang bang
- Hamedori
- Interracial
- Japanese bondage
- Gay
- Lesbian
- Lotion play
- Sexual fetishism
  - Foot fetishism
- Exhibitionism
- Tamakeri
- Voyeurism

== Companies and people ==
=== Magazines ===
- Bejean (GOT Corp.)—big seller
- Weekly Playboy (Shueisha)—big seller
- Urecco (Mirion Shuppan)
- Video Boy (GOT Corp.)

=== Publishers ===
- Core Magazine
- Futabasha
- Shinchosha
- Wani Books
- Wanimagazine

=== Studios ===
- Alice Japan
- Atlas21
- Attackers
- CineMagic Co.
- Cross
- Crystal-Eizou
- Dogma
- Glory Quest
- h.m.p.
- Hokuto Corporation
- Hot Entertainment
- IdeaPocket
- Japan Home Video
- KMP
- Kuki Inc.
- Madonna
- Max-A
- Million Film
- Moodyz
- Muteki
- S1 No. 1 Style
- SexiA
- Tokyo Hot
- Soft On Demand
- Total Media Agency
- V&R Planning—includes V&R Products & V&R International
- Wanz Factory

=== Personalities ===
- Ai Iijima
- Bunko Kanazawa
- Chocoball Mukai
- Maria Ozawa
- Sora Aoi
- Yua Aida
- Akiho Yoshizawa

== See also ==
- Chronology of adult videos in Japan
- Eirin – Movie regulating organization in Japan
- Ecchi – Japanese term for playful sexual actions (エッチ)
- Pornography in Europe
- Pornography in the United States
- Prostitution in Japan
- Sexuality in Japan
- Sex industry
