= Shigeo Tokuda =

Japanese pornographic actor

- 徳田 重男
- Born: August 18, 1934 (age 92); Chūō, Tokyo, Japan
- Other names: Kakek Sugiono (lit. 'Grandpa Sugiono' in Indonesia)
- Years active: 1994–Present
- Height: 5 ft 3 in (1.60 m)
- Children: 2

Shigeo Tokuda (徳田 重男, Tokuda Shigeo; born August 18, 1934) is the stage name of a Japanese adult video actor. Described as "the undisputed king of Japanese mature porn", Tokuda has inspired many adult industry actors to extend their retirement to a later age. Tokuda has gained international recognition after being profiled by CNN, The Guardian, Vice, and Yahoo.

== Life and career ==
Tokuda was born on August 18, 1934. He worked as a travel agent until his retirement at about age 60. According to Tokuda, "I retired and didn't have anything to do," so he started a second career and life as a porn actor. He had been buying porn videos directly from the production company (he could not face getting them at a video store) and had become friendly with a director who suggested he star in a video because "old-people porn" was becoming popular. By 2008, he had made over 350 videos, and according to one director, "In his generation, Tokuda is a superstar."

Ruby Productions, which produces his movies, started making "mature" movies with people in their thirties but the popularity of "elder porn" has led them to produce a line with people in their seventies, and Tokuda is their star. Tokuda works with both young and older actresses including a number of videos with 72-year-old Fujiko Ito. Given Japan's large elderly population with a lot of time on their hands, mature porn has become a lucrative market, reportedly accounting for 20-30% of sex movie revenue.

Male actors are usually anonymous in Japanese porn but Tokuda is now featured in his own branded series of videos for Ruby with actresses of various ages. Another studio specializing in elder porn is Glory Quest which launched the "old man" series Maniac Training of Lolitas in December 2004 and when that became popular, had Tokuda star with a variety of young AV actresses in the Forbidden Elderly Care (Forbidden Nursing) series beginning in August 2006. An additional series Big Tits Loving Grandfather Erotic Mischief for Glory Quest began in April 2008. Not all of Tokuda's roles involve sex and he enjoys acting different roles. He has said he hopes to be able to continue working in adult videos until he is 80 (with a laugh).

Tokuda became a sensation in the West when he was profiled on a CNN report in 2008, and Ruby has plans to release some of his videos in the United States.

== Personal life ==
Tokuda is married and has two children and a grandson. At first, he kept his involvement in pornography a secret, but he eventually had to come clean after his daughter found a fax about a scene he had been offered. He says that his wife of 45 years suspects he may be involved in the adult film industry, but she has never asked about it, allowing him to keep his status as an adult film star a secret.

== See also ==
- Aging of Japan
- Pornography in Japan
- Sexuality in Japan
