= Akira Takatsuki =

Japanese adult video director

- Born: 1959 (age 66–67); Setagaya, Tokyo, Japan
- Occupation: Film director
- Years active: 1982 – present

Akira Takatsuki (高槻彰, Takatsuki Akira) is a Japanese adult video (AV) director and producer, foremost known as a director of busty (and chubby) as well as kinbaku fetish genres.

== Early career ==
Takatsuki enrolled at the Chuo University in 1979 where he became a member of the film society and he found job as an art director in 1980. He later started to work under many directors and companies, and by August 1986, he was assigned as a director for the Nikkatsu distributed series The Production (ザ・本番, Za Honban) written by his friend Mikito Kawabata. Over the next year, Takatsuki directed six of these films.

== AV career ==
Takatsuki, intrigued by the opportunities of direct-to-video productions since Tadashi Yoyogi's successful series Onanie, started to shoot adult videos for Nikkatsu Video in 1987 and by 1988, he founded his AV production company Cinema Unit Gas (GAS). Through his works with big-bust actresses such as Shiori Fujitani and with videos like Bondage Special, Shiori Fujitani (ボンテージスペシャル 藤谷しおり) released in 1994, he had specialised in certain niches of pornography. In 1994, he directed the CineMagic Co. production Kinbaku Performance (緊縛パフォーマンス) that featured renowned nawashi Chimuo Nureki, Haruki Yukimura, and Doji Nekura.

A major breakthrough in Takatsuki's career came with his bakunyū series The Bomb Breasts (ザ・爆乳, Za Bakunyū) or Bomber Girl of 49 adult videos released from 1995 to early 2000s by the VCA label D-Cup, featuring many big-bust idols of the period such as Mariko Morikawa, Miki Sawaguchi, and Maria Tachibana. Takatsuki continued to produce bakunyū videos for various labels/studios such as Alice Japan, Madonna, and Atlas21 and also created for GAS an eponymous label that releases videos in the same niche, often featuring puranpā performers like Miyabi Hayama (葉山雅), Eri Hamasaki (浜咲恵利), Hana Uehara (上原花), Jun Minami (美波じゅん), Mitsuki An (杏美月), Satsuki Nayu (沙月なゆ), and Sora Nanami (七海そら). In December 2004, GAS released The Super Body: Kagari Manatsu (すごいからだ 真夏かがり) directed by Takatsuki as its first video in the big-bust gravure video series with the code GASW.

In 2003 and 2004, Takatsuki directed the series Why I Want to be Bound (私が緊縛されたい理由) that featured nawashi Akechi Denki and Chimuo Nureki for the CineMagic NOIR label. Another kinbaku video by Takatsuki that featured veteran nawashi Chimuo Nureki and American porn star Caroline Pierce as his bondage model, titled Brutal and Immoral Humiliation: Big Butt Woman from the USA (暴淫暴辱・USA巨尻女) was released from CineMagic NOIR label in 2005.

In 2014, Takatsuki directed a documentary film on famed AV entrepreneur Toru Muranishi titled Toru Muranishi: It Is Nice. The film, which took its name from one of Muranishi's early videos for Crystal-Eizou, won a special award at the New Directors Film Festival in Tokyo where it was shown in November 2014.
