= Urecco =

Japanese men's magazine

- Categories: Men's magazine
- Frequency: Monthly
- Founded: 1986
- Country: Japan
- Language: Japanese

Urecco (ウレッコ, Urekko) was a monthly men's magazine published in Japan. The title is a play on the Japanese word "Urekko" (売れっ子) which literally means "popular girl(s)" or "girl(s) who is/are much sought after. Urecco published nude and some non-nude photo layouts, mostly of adult video (AV) actresses, as well as AV reviews and actress interviews.

== History and profile ==
Urecco was first published in 1986. In the early and mid-2000s was rated by Peter Payne, proprietor of J-List, as the number one selling magazine at that company. The magazine went through many redesigns over the years, notably adding bizarre English to its covers in the early 1990s, with dubious English phrases like "wriggling labias" that would probably not be understood by most of its readers.

Urecco Gal (ウレッコギャル, Urekkogyaru) was an offshoot of the main publication which focused on models dressed as kogals, a type of vain, overly stylish Tokyo girl popular in the 1990s. Both Urecco and Urecco Gal were published by Million Publishing (ミリオン出版, Mirion Shuppan), part of the Taiyoh Group of companies, but neither magazine is now found in Million's list of magazines published although mobile web versions do exist.
