= Hanazono Room =

Apartment room and filming location in Tokyo, Japan

Sun Mall Crest
- サンモールクレスト (Japanese)
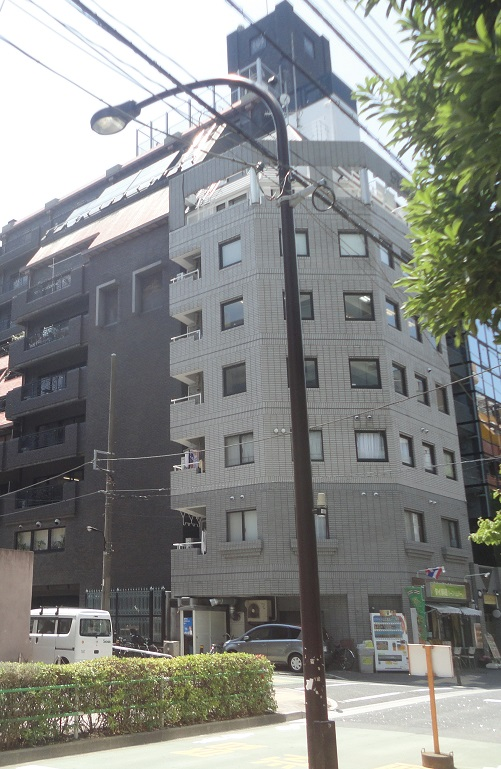
- Sun Mall Crest in Shinjuku-ku, Tokyo; Hanazono Room is located at the top floor
- Interactive map of the Sun Mall Crest area

General information
- Type: Mixed-use
- Location: Hanazono-dori Road, 1-19-10 Shinjuku, Shinjuku District, Tokyo, Japan
- Coordinates: 35°41′22.6″N 139°42′46.7″E
- Opened: 1988 (38 years ago)

Technical details
- Floor count: 10

Design and construction
- Known for: Pornographic film production, modeling photos

Hanazono Room (Japanese: はなぞのルーム), officially No. 136 Hanazono Room, is an apartment with an indoor swimming pool located in the top floor of the Sun Mall Crest condominium in Shinjuku, Tokyo, Japan.

Operated by P-Studio, it is infamous for being the filming location of hundreds of Japanese adult videos. Due to its association with Japanese pornography, Hanazono Room and its pool became popularly known as "The Pool" (例のプール, Rei no Pūru) or "That Pool" (あのプール, Ano Pūru) in the Japanese internet subculture.

== Location ==
Sun Mall Crest is located on Hanazono-dori (Hanazono Road), at the address 1-19-10 Shinjuku. It is across the street from Hanazono Elementary School and is accessible from Shinjuku-gyoemmae Station.

== History ==
Although the Sun Mall Crest building was built and completed in 1988, the Hanazono Room and its pool was built sometime around 2000, when Japan was recovering from the Lost Decade.

It became an apartment unit for actor Kōji Ishizaka, although he claimed that he lived a floor below, and the room actually belonged to another actor, Kon Ichikawa. Both actors have long since moved out of their units. (Ichikawa died in 2008.)

At some point following their tenancies, P-Studio acquired the room and rented it out to nearby studios. Beginning in 2004, and by the mid-to-late 2000s, the pool at Hanazono Room became frequently used as the background for swimsuit modeling photo shoots and low-budget pornographic films. This was caused by its proximity to Japanese gravure and pornographic studios, and their smaller budgets resulting in limited choices for shooting locations.

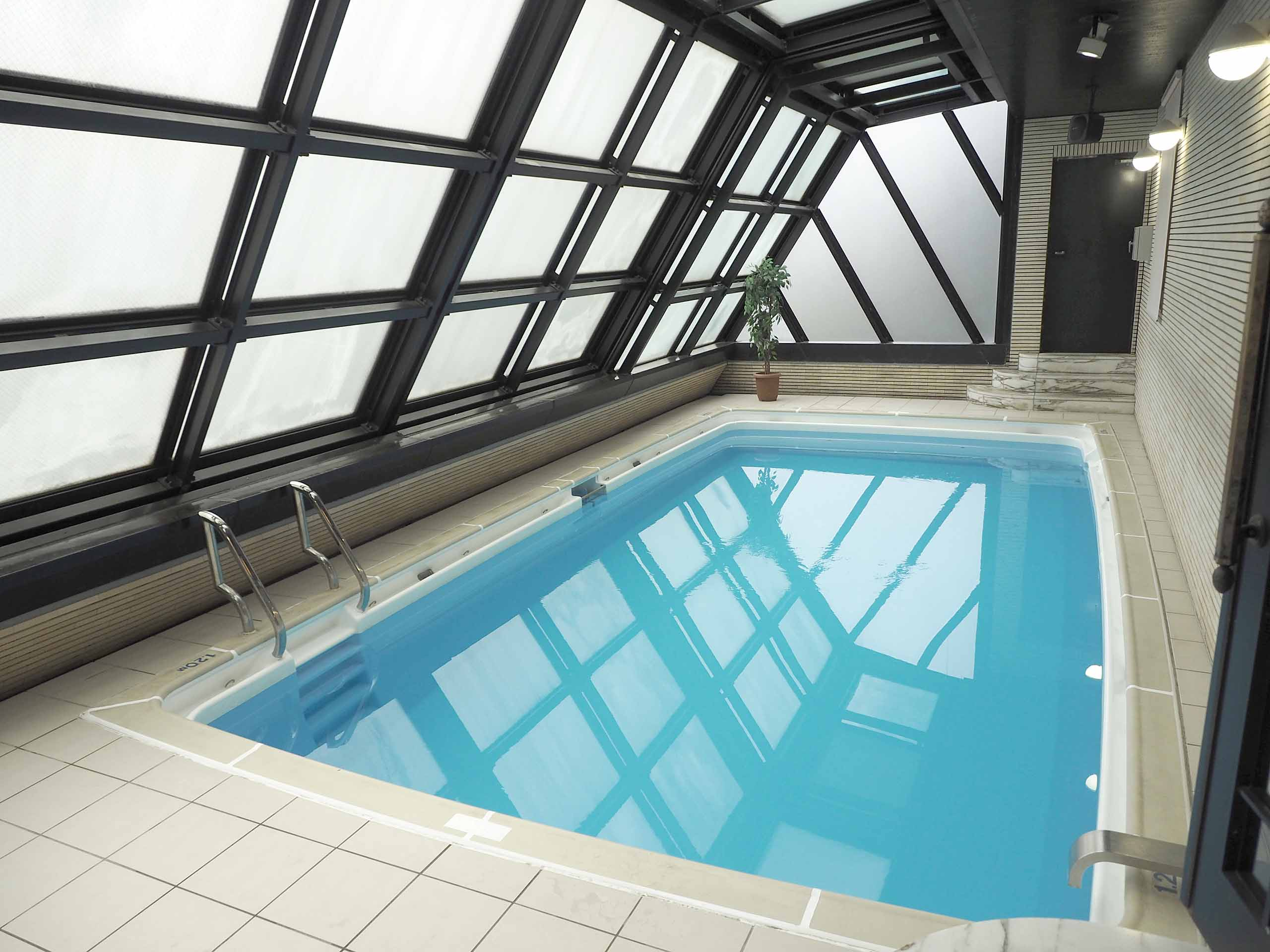
"The Pool," part of the Hanazono Room penthouse, located on the 9th floor

With stills from pornographic films of the pool circulating around the Japanese internet by the late 2000s, it became known as "That Pool" or "The Pool" in Japanese internet circles, particularly 2channel and Niconico. Not long after, news outlets began referring to it as "That Pool". As the pool became popular in local media, P-Studio itself began referring to it as "The Pool". "The Pool" has become an internet meme and gag in Japan.

After almost two decades of pornographic filming, on August 11, 2020, pornographic studios stopped using the pool. This was after P-Studio drastically increased its operating and maintenance fees due to the need to disinfect it of bodily fluids after pornographic shoots; this placed the operating expenses out of reach for pornographic studios.

== See also ==
- San Francisco Armory, another pornographic filming site
