= GQE =

GQE may refer to:

- Equatorial Guinean ekwele, a former currency of Equatorial Guinea
- Glory Quest, a Japanese pornographic film studio
- Green Square railway station, in Sydney, Australia
