= Video Boy =

Japanese men's magazine

- Magazine cover
- Categories: Men's magazine
- Frequency: Monthly
- First issue: 27 March 1984
- Country: Japan
- Language: Japanese

Video Boy (ビデオ ボーイ, Bideo Bōi) is a Japanese monthly men's magazine which has been published since 1984. It has been called "probably the most popular AV mag in Japan" and was described by Peter Payne, proprietor of J-List as an "excellent magazine...to keep up with...AV stars". The magazine specializes in nude photos of popular Japanese AV Idols.

Video Boy, and its sister publication, Bejean were published by Eichi Publishing (英知出版, Eichi Shuppan). On 11 April 2004, the company held a 20th anniversary celebration for the magazine at a location in Tokyo's Shinjuku district. The master of ceremonies for the event was AV actress, Mariko Kawana and the guests included AV Idols, Sora Aoi, and Akiho Yoshizawa.

Due to declining revenues, Eichi Publishing and its parent company closed operations in late March 2007, declaring bankruptcy with debts of 2.32 billion yen (about $20 million). Publication of Video Boy, Bejean, and other monthly magazines had been transferred from Eichi, in May 2006 and so the magazines survived the collapse of Eichi and are now published by the GOT Corporation (株式会社ジーオーティー, Kabushikigaisha Jīōtī) located in Ebisu, Tokyo near Japan's largest porn company, the Hokuto Corporation.

The magazine also maintains its own website, which offers video downloads and a catalog of AV actress profiles.
