= Toru Muranishi =

Japanese adult videos director

Tōru Muranishi
- 村西 とおる
- Born: Hiromi Kusano (草野 博美, Kusano Hiromi); 9 September 1948 (age 77); Iwaki, Fukushima Prefecture, Japan
- Education: Fukushima Prefectural Nakoso Technical High School
- Occupations: Film director Actor; Entrepreneur
- Years active: 1984–present
- Website: Official website

Toru Muranishi (村西とおる, Muranishi Tōru; born 9 September 1948) is an innovative and controversial director of Japanese adult videos (AV). Known in Japan as the "Emperor of Porn", he has been credited as one of the creators of the quasi-documentary style found in Japanese adult videos, a genre which has remained popular throughout the history of the adult industry in Japan. He was called "the dirtiest of the industry’s dirty old men" in a 1992 Tokyo Journal article by Kjell Fornander.

== Life and career ==
Toru Muranishi was born in Fukushima Prefecture, Japan. After graduating high school, Muranishi moved to Tokyo where he sold encyclopedias. He subsequently became involved in book publishing and the entertainment industry.

=== Crystal-Eizou ===
Muranishi joined the newly formed AV studio Crystal-Eizou in late 1984 and began directing films with them soon afterwards. Muranishi is given credit for launching the career of one of the first AV superstars, Kaoru Kuroki, who made her debut at Crystal-Eizou in October 1986. Among Muranishi's pioneering developments at Crystal-Eizou were his Face Shower (顔面シャワー, Ganmen Shawā) series which culminated in a facial, the Box Lunch Fuck (駅弁ファック, Ekiben Fakku) series where the actor would carry the actress around like a train-station food vendor, and the Conch Shell (ホラ貝, Hora Kai) videos where the actress would blow into a conch shell (as in some Buddhist rituals) to signify that she had reached an orgasm.

Muranishi has had numerous problems with the law in his career, having been convicted seven times of criminal violations. While at Crystal-Eizou, in June 1986, Muranishi was arrested for violating the Japanese Child Welfare Act (児童福祉法, Jidō Fukushi Hō) by using an underage actress in videos. Later that same year Muranishi brought a staff to Hawaii in a "legendary session" where he filmed 30 videos in 30 days. Muranishi flew in 15 or so actresses in turn from Japan for the shooting and in December 1986 was arrested in Hawaii for passport violations and was indicted under the Mann Act. He was released in July of the next year. Muranishi was once again arrested and fined for using a 17-year-old actress in August 1988.

=== Diamond Visual ===
In September 1988 Muranishi left Crystal-Eizou to form his own company, Diamond Visual (ダイヤモンド映像, Daiyamondo Eizō). According to Kjell Fornander, Diamond Visual was "a video giant which took porn to new limits and often beyond them". His Crystal-Eizou star Kaoru Kuroki also worked with him at Diamond Visual and in February 1989, a new star, Kimiko Matsuzaka, debuted with the company. Matsuzaka and her large bust led to a "Big Bust" boom in Japanese AV and helped assure the success of Diamond Visual. In the early 1990s Diamond Visual was "AV’s largest production company" and Muranishi has said that the company had annual sales of 10 billion yen (about $80 million). Muranishi also ventured into the softcore field, and directed the December 1990 release Daikyonyuu: Noshikakaru (大巨乳 のしかかる) for Xces featuring his two stars from Diamond Visual, Kaoru Kuroki and Kimiko Matsuzaka. The next year, he wrote the screenplay for another Matsuzaka vehicle, Daikyonyuu: Kaikan Shibori (大巨乳 快感絞り), released in March 1991 by Xces. Despite its popularity, Diamond Visual went bankrupt in 1992 with debts of 5 billion yen (about $40 million) and Muranishi had to greatly alter his style of living, going from a luxury home and Rolls-Royce to barely being able to afford an apartment.

=== Later career ===
Muranishi, who claims to have had sex with 7,000 women and produced some 3,000 adult videos, remained in the adult entertainment industry after the collapse of Diamond Visual and soon was broadcasting on his own satellite TV channel, producing about 15 movies a month with himself as producer, director, cameraman and star. That enterprise also collapsed and Muranishi once again ended up in debt.

Muranishi was the subject of a British Channel 4 TV documentary The Sex Shogun of Shinjuku, part of the 1995 Without Walls Special series. The program explored "the exploits of leading Japanese pornographer Touru Muranishi" and looked at the documentary porn genre with "real sex with real women in real places". The program was later released (in 1997) in VHS format with another program as Red Light Zone.

As an actor, Muranishi appeared in the 2000 Soft On Demand (SOD) produced V-Cinema Renshin Joshikousei Patty (恋身女子校生パティ} which starred SOD's leading actress Kurumi Morishita.

Muranishi is also a prolific writer both online and in print. He has contributed to a blog on Japanese AV supplier DMM's website, another blog on his own website, and a series of articles going back to 2005. He has also published a number of books including Toru Muranishi's Grade Book (村西とおるの閻魔帳), a 400-page collection of material from his blogs published by Cosmos Books (コスモの本) in March 2010 (ISBN 4906380905).

In February and March 2007, Takara Visual issued a four volume collection of Muranishi's works from 1999 to 2001.

Muranishi was the subject of a documentary film Toru Muranishi: It Is Nice by Akira Takatsuki which was screened at the New Directors Film Festival in Tokyo in November 2014. The film, which took its name from one of Muranishi's early videos for Crystal-Eizou, won a special award at the festival.

Muranishi also was the basis for the semi-biographical series The Naked Director which premiered on Netflix on 8 August 2019. Muranishi was played by actor Takayuki Yamada. On 15 August 2019, Netflix renewed the series for a second season. On 24 June 2021 Netflix released the second season of The Naked Director, with no plans for a third season in the foreseeable future.
