= Adult video in Japan =

Sex or nudity themed videos in Japan

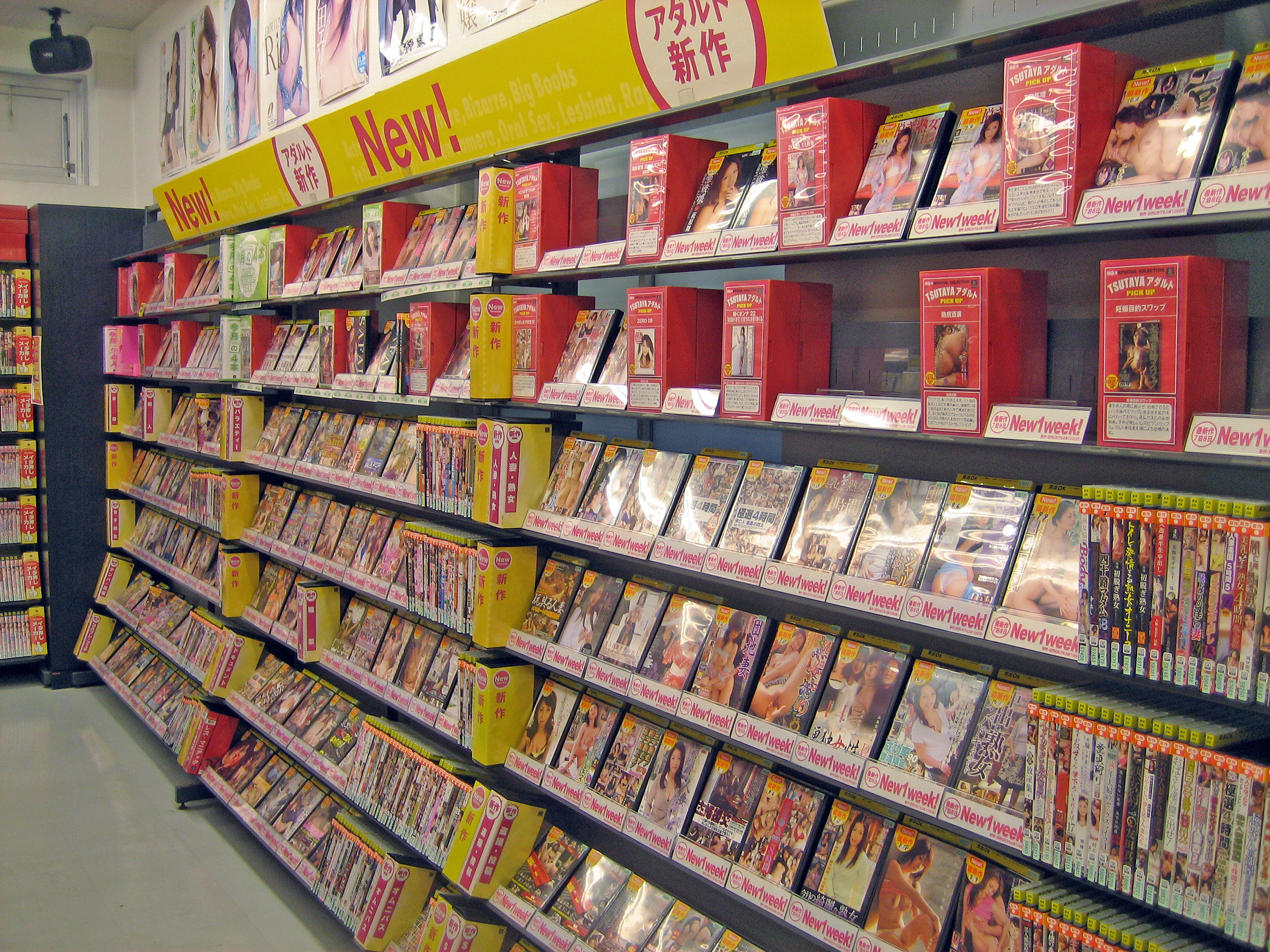
Adult videos in a Japanese rental shop, 2008

In Japan, adult videos (Japanese: アダルトビデオ, Hepburn: adaruto bideo) (AV) are pornographic films focusing on the depiction of human sexual activity and nudity. They are distinguished from Toei and Nikkatsu's pornographic feature films, indie pink films, less sex-centred 'V-cinema', and other Original Videos (オリジナル・ビデオ, Orijinaru Bideo) (OV). Adult videos feature sexual activities or nudity, and may not in some cases have a storyline. They are released initially on video, and pass inspection by an adult video ethics committee, originally the Nihon Ethics of Video Association (映像倫理機構, Eizō Rinri Kikō) (NEVA), which enforced the placement of video-masking mosaics over pubic hair or genitalia. Toei Porno, Nikkatsu Roman Porno and pink films are also often concerned with sex, but they are shown first in movie theatres, and are rated by Eirin (映画倫理管理委員会, Eiga Rinri Kanri Iinkai), rather than an adult video ethics organization. The mainstream studio Nikkatsu filmed its Roman Porno line from 1971 through 1988. V-cinema or OV also tend to have a story, but sex if present is less central, and they were released directly to VHS or recently DVD, Blu-Ray or streaming without being first shown in a movie theatre. Many V-cinema works are produced by video-focused subsidiaries of the big film studios, e.g. SHV Cinema for Shochiku. OV can be rated by the Eirin or Eizourin depending on the content.

== History ==
=== 1960s ===
Seijun Suzuki was a director for the major studio Nikkatsu. His films tended towards film noir or yakuza themes, but did include sexploitation elements such as nudity (eg. Take Aim at the Police Van 1960) or encounters with brothels (eg. 1962's Gate of Flesh) or prostitutes (eg. Story of a Prostitute 1965). The 1962 OP Eiga release Flesh Market though is usually regarded as the start of the sexploitation trend, and later came to be regarded as the first pink film. Small independent studios such as OP Eiga and Shintoho started churning out sexploitation films at a frenetic pace. The star of Flesh Market actress Tamaki Katori for instance appeared in over 600 films between 1962 and 1972. Toei also produced erotic films starting with Sadao Nakajima's Kunoichi ninpō in 1964, and continuing with films by Teruo Ishii in the late 1960's. Major studio Shochiku also ventured the occasional sexploitation film eg. Daydream (1964 film) or Woman of the Lake 1966 about a married woman who allows a man to take nude pictures of her.

=== 1970 ===
Toei spun off it subsidiary Toei Video, even though videotape cameras, recorders and players were mainly used by television networks at the time, not in people's homes.

=== 1971 ===
Sony released its first U-matic video cassette recorders, moving from reel to reel to a cassette format. U-matics were also used mainly by tv networks.

Toei included the English loanword 'porno' on a poster for the first time. Takashi Itamochi, president of Nikkatsu, Japan's oldest major film studio, made the decision to put the company's high production values and professional talent into the adult industry as a way of attracting a new audience. When Nikkatsu launched its Roman Porno series in November 1971 with the Apartment Wife series, these softcore erotic films proved popular with both the public and the critics. This introduction of erotica into mainstream Japanese movie theaters has been credited with saving Nikkatsu from collapse at that time. Nikkatsu mainly offered 'Roman Porno' films for the next 17 years, releasing an average of three such films a month.

Independent studios such as Shintōhō Eiga and Million Films were already producing what now became known as 'pink film', but Nikkatsu remained the dominant producer of high-production theatrical pornography in Japan. By the end of the 1970s, Nikkatsu's 'Roman Porno' together with 'pink films' by other studios made up over 70% of the domestic Japanese film market.

=== 1972 ===
The big three video makers of the time Nikkatsu, Toei Video and Nihon Bikotte band together to create an organization to monitor the ethics of adult videos, the Adult Video Independent Ethics Regulatory Cooperative (成人ビデオ自主規制倫理懇談会, Seijin Bideo Jishu Kisei Rinri Sōdankai).

=== 1975 ===
Sony releases its first Betamax video cassette recorder. It was cheaper than the U-matic, and opened up the possibilities for people to buy them for home use.

=== 1976 ===
JVC releases its first VHS video cassette recorder. For a number of years after, there was a format war between VHS and betamax for the consumer market with VHS eventually winning out.

=== 1977 ===
The ethics organization is renamed the Nihon Ethics of Video Association (日本ビデオ倫理協会 Nihon Bideo Rinri Kyōkai), and affixes its NEVA stamp to approved videos. NEVA requires makers to put in large checkered mosaics over pubic hair and genitals.

=== 1980 ===
Binibon magazine publisher Kuki Inc.(九鬼) released its first adult video. Binibon were magazines with photos of beautiful idols in underwear sealed in plastic (biniiru from English vinyl being the Japanese word for plastic and bon the word for book).

Ownership of VCRs starts to spread more widely. Adult videos provided privacy and comfort that the older, established theatrical pink films could not. Also, Patrick Macias points out that adult videos were better able to focus on niche-interests, and provided the convenience of the fast-forward button.

=== 1981 ===
After starring in Japan's first theatrically released hardcore film, director Tetsuji Takechi's Daydream (1981), Kyoko Aizome made her AV debut in November 1981, making her one of Japan's earliest AV idols. Cosmos Plan (宇宙企画, Uchū Kikaku) was founded in October, and later changed its name to Media Station. Samm Video was founded to produce S&M videos, and later changed its name to h.m.p. (Japan). In December, Tadashi Yoyogi founded Athena Eizou.

=== 1982 ===
Adult videos attained an approximately equal share of the adult entertainment market with theatrical erotic films. Faced with this new competition over the adult entertainment audience, Nikkatsu focused on production of its S&M films, which had been their most popular product.

Japan's video rental stores increasingly adopt a policy of only stocking videos with the NEVA stamp of approval, leading more and more studios to join NEVA.

The early adult video, Ken-chan, the Laundry Man (洗濯屋ケンちゃん, Sentakuya Kenchan), became a hit in Japan in 1982, selling over 200,000 copies, an unprecedented number for an adult video. The popularity of this VHS-format video has been said to have increased the sales of video recorders at this time. The popularity of this early video led to its release in the United States by the Orchid International company in 1984.

Early AV performers were often struggling actresses who could not find work in the theatrical Roman Porno films and girls from the soaplands. 1982 saw the debut of one of the earliest prominent AV actresses, Kate Asabuki, whose name would appear on the titles of both AVs and theatrical films. She would go on to serve as a co-host of the weekly television show Tokyo Rock TV.

=== 1983 ===
Satomi Shinozaki, who debuted on AV in 1983, had a career in theatrical films for another 20 years, directing a film in 2001. Another 1983 debut, Kyōko Hashimoto, would graduate from AVs to a successful theatrical film career, appearing in over 100 films, including Kei Mizutani's breakthrough film Weather Woman (1996)

=== 1984 ===
The Crystal-Eizou studio was founded. Director Toru Muranishi joined soon after, and began developing a quasi-documentary approach to filming AV.

Yumiko Kumashiro, who debuted in 1984, later starred in a series of theatrical films for Nikkatsu under her stage-name, Eve. She went on to a successful career as a striptease dancer, and starred in films for the Shintōhō Eiga studio in the 1990s.

Also during this year, Wonder Kids studio released the first completely pornographic animated film, Lolita Anime. It was an immediate success and Nikkatsu quickly jumped on the trend and released their own direct-to-video animated porno under the same title with recognizably similar characters.

New government policies and an agreement between Eirin (the Japanese film-rating board) and the pink film companies put drastic new restrictions on theatrical films. Theatrical pink film profits dropped 36% within a month of the new ruling.

=== 1985 ===
Eri Kikuchi was an early AV actress to capitalize on her large bust, a metric E-cup. Though she had made underground tapes previously, her official AV debut was in September 1985. She appeared in AVs, magazines and theatrical films such as Shintōhō Eiga's 1986 Eri Kikuchi - Big Breasts (菊池エリ 巨乳 - Kikuchi Eri Kyonyu). In 2003 she was a lecturer/demonstrator for classes at the AV Cultures School, a school for aspiring AV directors, and in 2007, 23 years after her AV Debut, she was still releasing AVs.

Nikkatsu tried to tempt audiences back to adult theaters with higher-caliber pink films, beginning with the Flower and Snake (Hana To Hebi) series (1985–1987), based on its 1974 Roman Porno S/M hit Flower and Snake, starring Naomi Tani.

Nikkatsu tried to circumvent the new theatrical rules and to compete directly with adult videos by entering their own turf. To launch the company's new "Harder Than Pink" AV series, Nikkatsu wanted Masaru Konuma, director of the highly popular and critically praised 1974 Roman Porno Wife to be Sacrificed, to make a hard-core version of his script Woman in the Box (箱の中の女 - Hako No Naka No Onna) in 1985. Konuma was at first reluctant, but Nikkatsu was able to persuade him to make the video by agreeing to allow Konuma to direct his original (and, according to the Weissers, artistically superior) version of this script for theatrical release the following year. However, Nikkatsu soon ceased production of this video series when it proved unsuccessful with the public.

=== 1986 ===
Alice Japan (アリス Arisu JAPAN) was established on April 4, 1986, as the adult video label for V-cinema maker Japan Home Video.

Hitomi Kobayashi's career in the AV field would last for over a decade and a half, earning her the title "Japan's Queen of Adult Video." Her 39 AVs sold over 600,000 copies, earning about 6 billion yen. According to the adult entertainment editor for Shukan Shincho, "She laid the foundations for the golden age of adult video."

Kaoru Kuroki, has been called "the first high-profile AV actress." After becoming a popular star of pornographic videos, she was seen on late-night television, then on daytime talk shows and in national advertising campaigns. She became admired by women for her outspoken but polite and frank discussions of sex, and for expressing "feminist" views on television. According to Rosemary Iwamura, she changed the image of the AV actress. "...she didn't seem to be making videos because of a lack of options but rather as an informed choice." Kuroki's director at Crystal-Eizou, Toru Muranishi, became known as an industry innovator who helped create the documentary-style format which would become a trademark of Japanese AVs.

Nikkatsu hired AV queen Hitomi Kobayashi (debut 1986 - see list below) to star in her own theatrical film series in 1987, but these films were judged as little more than AVs on film, and were not popular.

=== 1987 ===
In an attempt to compete with the AV industry, Nikkatsu hired AV queen Hitomi Kobayashi, who had debuted the previous year, to star in her own theatrical film series in 1987. These films were not popular with AV fans, who preferred the privacy the AV offered, or with movie-goers, who judged them as little more than AVs on film.

Nao Saejima, who debuted in 1987, would star in self-titled theatrical releases for Nikkatsu, the pink film, Abnormal Excitement: Nao Saejima (1989), and the mainstream Meet Me In the Dream: Wonderland (1996) A 2006 article reported that Saejima was then working as an artist.

=== 1988 ===
Nikkatsu closed its production facilities in April. Bed Partner (1988) was the final film of the 17-year-old Roman Porno series. Nikkatsu continued to distribute films under the name Ropponica, and theatrical pornography through Excess Films. However these were not nearly as popular or critically respected as the Roman Porno series had been in its heyday.

Prolific pink film actor Yutaka Ikejima entered the directing profession in 1988 through the AV medium. He would eventually move into directing theatrical pink films in 1991, earning several awards at the Pink Grand Prix through the years for his contributions to that genre.

Diamond Visual, which would become the largest AV company for a while, was founded in September 1988 by Toru Muranishi. Muranishi had worked at Crystal-Eizou when Kaoru Kuroki made her debut there in 1986. Sharing his vision of documentary-style AVs, Kuroki followed Muranishi to his new company.

1988 debut, Keiko Murakami would star in the pink film Apartment Wife Affair in Full View (団地妻不倫丸見え, Danchi Tsuma Furin Maru Mie) (1991).

1988 debut, Rena Murakami produced a self-titled movie under her own production unit (Rena Films), under Excess in 1997.

=== 1989 ===
Yumika Hayashi, who would earn the title of "Japan's Original Adult Video Queen" during a 16-year career, debuted in 1989. She would star in almost 200 AVs and 180 pink films in her career. A documentary on her life was filmed in 1997, and she was awarded Best Actress at the Pink Grand Prix awards in 2005. Her death in 2005 ended one of the longest careers in the field. and made front-page news in Tokyo.

1989 debuts

- Megu Goto (五島めぐ) Debut: 1989; Born: 1970/10/20 Tokyo.
- Yumika Hayashi
- Shiina Itou (いとうしいな) aka (椎名かほり), (柏木ゆかり) Debut: 1989; Born: 1970/10/6 Tokyo.
- Natsuko Kayama (加山なつこ); Debut: August, 1989; Born: 1970/12/23 Tokyo.

=== AVs in the 1990s ===
The 1990s opened with the government lifting its 40-year ban on pubic hair in print. According to the Weissers, "by mid-1991, full frontal nudity became commonplace in Japanese magazines and books." The restriction on pubic hair in film and video had been relaxed for imported films, but remained in place for domestic films and AVs until the middle of the decade.

==== 1990 ====
The "Big Bust Boom" (巨乳ブーム, Kyonyu Buumu) which became a significant genre of the AV market with Kimiko Matsuzaka's debut early the previous year, continued in 1990. Matsuzaka would appear in her last AV in October 1990, and retire from public life in 1991. Among the leading busty models who debuted this year was Kuwata Kei, whose 113 cm bust measurement was the first in the AV industry to surpass Matsuzaka's advertised 110.7-centimeter metric G-cup. Though never as popular as Matsuzaka, Kuwata's career would last until at least 1998.

==== 1991 ====
Kimiko Matsuzaka's sudden retirement from public life in the spring of 1991 came as a shock to the AV industry. Director Toru Muranishi called Matsuzaka's October 1990 departure from AVs one of the worst stories of the year for the AV industry. Muranishi's company, Diamond Visual, for which Matsuzaka worked, would go from the largest AV producing company to declaring bankruptcy within a year of her retirement.

Actress Rie Miyazawa's shashinshuu (photo book) Santa Fe, released in November 1991, was one of the first photo books to take advantage of the lifting of the long-standing ban on the showing of pubic hair. Revealing a little hair in one picture, the book became a national phenomenon, selling 1.5 million copies. "Hea nuudo" (or "Hair nudes") in photography became commonplace, but the ban remained in place for AVs.

The TV show Gilgamesh Night begins airing on TV Tokyo, and many former AV actresses appear as regulars: Ai Iijima, Reiko Hayama, Asami Jō, Miku Kawakami, Rina Kitahara and Youko Yazawa. A number of nude models and mainstream actresses also appeared: Kei Mizutani, Fumie Hosokawa and Tamao Satō.

==== 1992 ====
The independent Lahaina Tokai studio was founded in Nagoya, focusing on outdoor exhibitionist and other fetish videos. Like many independent studios, it refused to join NEVA, sold to specialized AV stores rather than mainstream video rental shops, and used a finer mosaic to obscure pubic hair. It becomes known for its documentary approach.

The independent film studio, Shintōhō Eiga, entered the AV market in 1992 with its "Hard Porno" series. This was a line of video-releases of older Kōji Wakamatsu-produced S&M films. The series opened with the Shin'ya Yamamoto (director)-directed Naomi Tani film Cruelty of the Female Inquisition (1975). Wakamatsu's own Torture Chronicles were released to video in this series.

In the wake of the preceding year's "hair nude" photo by Rie Miyazawa, other celebrities appear in photos displaying pubic hair, including Yoko Shimada and Keiko Oginome. Toru Muranishi's Diamond Visual, the largest AV production company at the time, declared bankruptcy in February, 1992.

==== 1993 ====
Nihon Video Hanbai (日本ビデオ販売) opens a nationwide chain of adult video shops Bideo Yasuuriou (ビデオ安売王) selling original indies videos (some produced by Soft on Demand or Toru Muranishi).

Shuttle Japan was established, and becomes a prominent maker of outdoor exhibitionism, bukakke and gokkun videos.

==== 1995 ====
Panasonic, Philips, Sony and Toshiba come out with the first DVD cameras, players and recorders. DVD eventually comes to replace VHS as the dominant format for adult video.

In December 1995, Ganari Takahashi founded the AV studio Soft On Demand, which would become the largest independent adult video company in Japan and notable for its creative approach to adult videos. Soft on Demand refused to join NEVA, and started up its own ethics organization, which allowed for finer mosaics than NEVA's big blocky ones. This may have been a factor in SOD's success. Momotaro (桃太郎映像) was also founded this year, and eventually became a rival to SOD in the Indies market.

Until the mid-1990s, AV actress were almost exclusively models in their late teens or early 20s at the time of their debuts. However, at this time, "mature women" models in AVs became increasingly popular. While youthful debuts would still remain the norm, this broadening in tastes would pave the way for the debuts of future "mature" AV stars.

Ruka Aida was one of the most popular 1995 AV debuts, and became known for refusing to allow her male partners to wear condoms in spite of industry concerns over AIDS. After retiring from AV appearances, she would work as a masseuse at a "soapland" in Tokyo's Yoshiwara district, and then, in 2004, open her own bar in Tokyo's Roppongi district.

In her AV actress careers, Aika Miura averaged one film a month over a seven-year period. She starred in the theatrically released, widescreen film Aika Miura - Streetcar Ecstasy in 2001, and retired in 2002, seven years after her AV debut.

1995 debuts

- Ruka Aida (愛田るか) Debut: 1995, Born: 1971/9/4 Kanagawa.
- Asami Jo

==== 1996 ====
Soft on Demand set up the Media Rinri Kyoukai (メディア倫理協会) to monitor the content of videos produced by SOD group and allied indie studios. Mediarin enforces thinner mosaics than NEVA allowing the indies makers to gain market share.

Miki Sawaguchi was one of the more prominent actresses to debut in 1996. Through appearances in magazine photo layouts, gravure books, AV videos, TV and radio appearances, and even releasing CDs, this AV actress became a multi-media star.

A December 2005 news article claimed that 1996 AV debut, Yuri Komuro was "one of the brightest stars in the adult video firmament", and reported that she had begun working as an author after her 1999 retirement. At the height of her popularity, Komuro participated in developing a perfume from the odor that had built up in a pair of panties she had worn for several days. The perfume was named "Asoko" (literally, "That place"), a word used as a euphemism for the genitals by the Japanese.

==== 1997 ====
A 2006 article reported that 1997 debut, Sally Yoshino, was then working as a striptease dancer.

==== 1999 ====
Hokuto Corporation creates the Digital Media Mart (DMM) corporation to sell and rent adult videos over the World Wide Web. This eventually becomes the largest online adult video store in Japan.

1999 debut, Mami Aizawa was called "one of the hottest commodities in the Japanese adult video world" in a 2003 article. She had reportedly preserved her virginity until her third AV appearance since her first required only modeling, and the second displayed her manual skills on her male counterpart.

In October 2006, seven years after her 1999 debut, AV star Minori Aoi appeared in a controversial promotional campaign for the 2nd International Healthy City Conference in the People's Republic of China.

1999 debuts

- Mami Aizawa (相沢まみ) Debut 1999, Born: 1980/06/15 Tokyo.

==== 2000 ====
Anna Ohura became one of the leading big-bust performers in the AV industry, developing an international following. At one point she claimed to have the largest breasts in the Japanese adult film industry.

2000 debut Emily Yoshikawa would become a leading AV actress, and make news in the entertainment field with her retirement from the screen to work in Tokyo's Yoshiwara "soapland" district in 2004.

Nao Oikawa became romantically involved with popular comedian Jinnai Tomonori, and retired from the AV industry in 2004. She followed her AV career with appearances on TV variety shows.

Busty, mature actress, Aki Tomozaki's AV debut in 2000, at the age of 30, initiated a career of over 250 appearances. Her attractively motherly appearance and large breasts gave her a leading role opposite younger actors in many AVs with an incest theme.

2000 debuts

- Nao Oikawa (及川奈央 / おいかわなお) Debut: 2000, Retired: 2004; Born: 1981/04/21 Saitama Prefecture.
- Emily Yoshikawa (吉川エミリー) Debut: 2000; Retired: 2004; Born 1980/6/3 Dominican Republic.

==== 2001 ====
Ai Kurosawa became a recognized AV actress, winning the "Main AV Actress Award" at Takeshi Kitano's second Entertainment Awards ceremony.

Hitomi Hayasaka, who had planned on majoring in motel management before her AV debut, became one of the more frequently appearing AV performers, making over 120 appearances and still appearing in AVs five years after her debut in the industry.

Nozomi Momoi, was one of the more prominent AV debuts of the year, appearing in over 100 AVs within a year of her 2001 debut, However her career would be cut short in October 2002 in a murder-suicide that shocked the nation.

Erika Nagai cultivated the image of a martial arts expert in her AVs, and became a favorite of followers of the "strong-woman" genre which became popular in the 2000s.

==== 2002 ====
A March 2002 Shukan Bunshun article reported that AV actress Yumika Hayashi, who had made her debut in 1989, participated in a symposium and showing of pink films in the Shibuya district targeted for women.

According to a 2003 article, gravure idol Maria Takagi, who made her AV debut in 2002, was then the highest-paid AV actress in Japan. She was paid 300 million yen to perform in 30 films. Called the "Aya Matsuura of porn", she made her acting debut in the 2003 Fuji Television dramatic series, Anata no Tonari no Dareka Iru.. She retired in 2004 and has appeared in many TV dramas since then. Her other acting appearances include a role in the 2005 horror-comedy, Tokyo Zombie.

==== 2003 ====
Shinji Kubo, a male AV actor who had appeared in over 800 videos, opened the AV Cultures School on May 25, 2003. Established to help aspiring AV directors, actress Eri Kikuchi, who made her AV debut in 1984, was one of the first instructors at this school.

Hitomi Kobayashi, who had debuted in 1986 and was called Japan's Queen of Adult Video, announced her retirement with a final, big-budget AV. The widely advertised project was announced for investors in July 2003. Investors in the video would later complain of unethical financial practises.

With no previous film-acting experience, Emi Kuroda, an AV veteran of some 200 videos, was chosen to star in 'pink film' director Mitsuru Meike's Horny Home Tutor: Teacher's Love Juice (発情家庭教師 先生の愛汁, Hatsujō katei kyōshi: sensei no aijuru) (2003). Re-released as The Glamorous Life of Sachiko Hanai, the film became a surprise cult hit, playing at 20 international film festivals.

Minami Aoyama made her AV debut and pink film debut both in 2003. She would win the Best Actress award at the 2006 Pink Grand Prix.

==== 2004 ====
AV star, Emily Yoshikawa, who had debuted in 2000, announced her retirement from the screen in 2004. Her decision to work in Tokyo's red-light Yoshiwara district became a major news item in adult entertainment. Cost for a session with Yoshikawa started at 70,000 yen, which would pay for a trip to Hong Kong and back. Nevertheless, within days of the announcement, Yoshikawa's waiting list was booked three months in advance.

Financial controversy following the release of Hitomi Kobayashi's final AV in December 2003, A March 2004 article reported that Kobayashi, who had debuted in 1986, was then working as a hostess at a nightclub in the Roppongi district of Tokyo. Her husband, the former president of her talent agency, was working as her driver.

Also in Roppongi, the doors to the bar, "Ruka", opened in June 2004. This establishment was named after its owner, the retired AV star Ruka Aida, who had made her AV debut in 1995.

The first instance of Hanazono Room and its indoor pool, later to be known as "That Pool" by the media, being used as shooting venue for porn films was recorded with a swimming-themed porn film being shot there.

Hotaru Akane, who debuted in 2004, was named "Newcomer of the Year" in Weekly Playboy's 2005 "AV Academy Awards". Her particular talent with female ejaculation earned her the title "Shiofuki Queen".

==== 2005 ====
Yumika Hayashi's death after celebrating her 35th birthday in June 2005 ended one of the longest careers in the AV field. Debuting in 1989, by the time of her death, she had become known as "Japan's Original Adult Video Queen." Her 16-year career included appearances in over 400 videos and films, including a documentary on herself.

A December 2005 Asahi Geino article reported on the current careers of several prominent former AV actresses. Yuri Komuro was working as an author, Nao Saejima was working as an artist. Ruka Aida was still operating her self-named bar in Roppongi, which she had opened the previous year. Sally Yoshino had returned to her favorite form of adult entertainment, performing as a striptease dancer. Hitomi Hasegawa was planning and appearing in "sexy events" as an "erotic missionary."

==== 2006 ====
Japan's Ministry of Economy, Trade and Industry pushes indies and old-line AV makers to work together to enforce common standards regarding rating and mosaics.

Adult video conglomerate Soft On Demand and tabloid paper Tokyo Sports inaugurated the AV Open contest for most sales with eighteen AV companies submitting entries.

==== 2007 ====
The Japanese police raid NEVA headquarters, and arrest NEVA officials and JAV company presidents charging them with allowing mosaics which are too thin.

==== 2008 ====
The AV Grand Prix ceremony succeeded the AV Open. Human Terrible Wrapper (人間酷包, Ningenkokuhō), starring 2002 "mature woman" debut Maki Tomoda, won "Best SM Video".

==== 2009 ====
Busty gravure idol Fuko made her AV debut on February 1, 2009.

==== 2010 ====
NEVA and SOD group's Content Soft Association hand over their duties to the newly created Japan Contents Review Center ending the division between old-line and indies JAV makers with regard to mosaics and rating.

==== 2015 ====
Former SKE48 band member, Yua Mikami, entered the adult entertainment industry in 2015 under the Muteki label.

==== 2019 ====
In 2019, Netflix released The Naked Director, a series of videos portraying the life of AV director Toru Muranishi.

== See also ==
- AV idol
- Pornography in Japan
