= Glory Quest =

Japanese pornographic film studio

- Industry: Pornography
- Headquarters: Toshima, Tokyo, Japan
- Key people: Ken Miyasaka (CEO)
- Products: Pornographic films
- Website: http://www.gloryquest.co.jp/

Glory Quest (グローリークエスト, Gurōriikuesuto) is a Japanese adult video (AV) production company specializing in fetish videos. Its offices are in the Toshima ward of Tokyo, Japan.

== Company information ==
The Glory Quest studio has produced adult videos since at least June 10, 2000, when it released Sweet Doll 01 (スイートドールスペシャル 01) on VHS (SDS-01). In December 2019, DMM listed 3532 videos available for purchase under the Glory Quest studio, and 2110 videos under the GLORY QUEST label. The company releases videos twice a month, totaling approximately 18–20 videos each month. On their website, www.gloryquest.tv, members can download videos and order Glory Quest DVDs. They also sell its products in stores throughout Japan.

Glory Quest produces adult videos in various adult genres, including popular actresses in "big bust" (巨乳) videos. It has also made more extreme fetish videos under its Maniac label, including such genres as fisting, S&M, scat and, at one time, bestiality. Its Maniac Shemale, Transgender and Ultra Sex labels feature videos with transsexual actresses.

Another notable genre for Glory Quest has been "elder porn", a fast-growing niche in Japanese pornography. As Glory Quest public relations representative Kayoko Iimura has said: "If we only make standard fare, we cannot beat other studios ... so we wanted to make something new. A relationship between wife and an old father-in-law has enough twist to create an atmosphere of mystery and captivate viewer's hearts." Glory Quest's elder star is Shigeo Tokuda, born in 1934, who has "proved to be a goldmine for Glory Quest" with two "old man" series: Maniac Training of Lolitas (December 2004) and Forbidden Elderly Care (Forbidden Nursing) (August 2006). A third series, Big Tits Loving Grandfather Erotic Mischief, began in April 2008.

Glory Quest, incorporated as GQE Inc. (有限会社GQE), had capital of 3 million yen (about $30,000) in 2010. Its CEO is Ken Miyasaka (宮坂謙). It remains an independent company and is not part of a conglomerate. Like other Japanese AV companies, it belongs to one of the voluntary "ethics groups" which regulate content and censorship: the Content Soft Association (CSA) (Japanese: コンテンツ・ソフト協同組合 [Software Content Association]), a creation of the Soft On Demand group of companies.

== Labels ==
In addition to the Glory Quest label, the company has also used the following labels for its videos:

- ACB
- ACD
- Boys Kageki
- Dangerous Relations
- Et cetera
- GQR
- High Tension
- Incest

- Kebabu
- Maniac
- Maniac Shemale
- Sex Care
- Social Q
- TopazJ
- Trance Jender
- Ultra Sex

== Actresses ==
These AV Idols have appeared in Glory Quest productions:

- Hotaru Akane
- Yumi Kazama
- Riri Kōda
- Meguru Kosaka
- Momoka Nishina
- Maria Tominaga
- Aki Tomosaki
- Hime Tsukino

== Series ==
Popular Glory Quest video series include:

- Beast King (獣皇)
- Big Tits Loving Grandfather Erotic Mischief (ボイン大好き亀市爺さんのHなイタズラ 壱)
- Busty Medical Certificate (巨乳診断書)
- Forbidden Nursing (禁断介護)
- Incest (近親相姦)
- Love of Big Tits Prank (ボイン大好きしょう太くんのHなイタズラ)
- New Half Trance (ニューハーフトランス)
- Sexy Mature Nakadashi (艶熟 中出し)
- She Male Jam (シーメールジャム)
- She Male Jack
- The Gal Nan
- The Gal's Night

== AV Grand Prix ==
In 2008, Glory Quest competed in the industry contest the AV Grand Prix, with the entry She Male Jam ～Exclusive Tune～ (AVGP-012) starring transsexual actresses Sena Arisawa and Mina Yumeno.

In the 2009 AV Grand Prix, GQ's nominee, Incest Family (近親相姦 昭和禁断血族「母さん、この家は狂ってます」) (AVGP-115), starring Natsumi Kitahara, Reiko Yamaguchi and Kasumi Nanase, took the Supporters Award.
