= Bejean =

Japanese monthly men's magazine

- Categories: Men's magazine
- Frequency: Monthly
- First issue: 1 July 1984
- Country: Japan
- Language: Japanese

Bejean (ビージーン, Bijin) is a Japanese monthly men's magazine which originally started publication under the name Beppin (ベッピン, Beppin). It has been described as "probably the best selling men's magazine" in Japan and was called by J-List "One of the cornerstones of Japanese AV magazines." As with its sister publication Video Boy, the magazine specializes in nude photo sets of present and aspiring Japanese AV idols.

Its distinguishing feature was a "centerfold", a 29x89 cm double-sided "Body Poster", displaying a full frontal nude from the head to the thighs. The reverse was a view of the nude backside from the head to heels, the model turned about 45 degrees. No clothing, shoes, jewelry, props or sets were used in the poster and the typical background was flat blue.

The magazine began appearing in July 1984 as Beppin. The last issue of Beppin was the 15 December issue of 1994, Volume #131 (it was bi-monthly, on the 1st and the 15th, in the last six months of publication). It was reborn as Bejeans in the 15 February issue of 1995, Volume #1. The name was shortened to Bejean in the 15 March 1996, Volume #24. It published bi-monthly until 1997 when it became a monthly.

Beppin in Japanese means "beautiful woman" and Bejean is a play on the Japanese word "bijin" (美人) which has the same meaning with an additional connotation of "hot girl."

Bejean and Video Boy had both been published by Eichi Publishing (英知出版, Eichi Shuppan) but declining revenues forced Eichi and its parent company to close operations in late March 2007, declaring bankruptcy with debts of 2.32 billion yen (about US$20 million). Publication of Bejean, Video Boy and other monthly magazines had been transferred from Eichi in May 2006 so the magazines survived the collapse of that company and are both now published by the GOT Corporation (株式会社ジーオーティー, Kabushikigaisha Jīōtī) located in Ebisu, Tokyo near Japan's largest porn company, the Hokuto Corporation.

The magazine also has a website, Bejean On Line (ビージーンオンライン), online since January 2001, which features nude and "gravure" (non-nude) pictorial sets and a catalog of back copies of the magazine reaching back to 2002 at Bejean On Line Back Number.
