= Lotion play =

Sexual fetishism

Lotion play, also known as gookakke or gluekakke (from goo or glue and bukkake), is a sexual practice involving the use of large amounts of lotion or lubricant during sexual intercourse. In Japan, it is known as rōshon purei (ローションプレイ). As a practice in the Japanese prostitution and Japanese pornography industries, lotion play commonly involves a participant rubbing lotion on another using their body, sexual intercourse in a pool or bath filled with lotion, or lotion being poured over participants during sex.

== See also ==
- Gunge
- Oil wrestling
