= Ganari Takahashi =

Japanese adult video director

- Born: 1958 (age 67–68); Kanagawa Prefecture, Japan

Ganari Takahashi (高橋がなり, Takahashi Ganari) is a Japanese adult video director and company founder. He founded Soft On Demand (SOD), one of the largest adult video conglomerates in Japan.

== Life and career ==
Takahashi was born in Kanagawa Prefecture, Japan in 1958. After graduating from high school he went to work as a driver for the Sagawa Express Co. where he made himself into the best driver in the company. In 1981 he joined the TV production company IVS where he worked for Terry Itoh (ja:テリー伊藤) directing shows such as Tensai Takeshi no Genki ga deru TV (Genius Takeshi's Exhilarating TV Show). He also later worked at a Chinese restaurant.

=== SOD ===
Takahashi used 10 million Yen (about $100,000) borrowed from Itoh to invest in two companies, one in golf-related goods and the other in the apparel business, but both failed. About that time, an AV company with about 10 employees was on the edge of bankruptcy and Takahashi with help from Itoh was able to use the company as the basis for the foundation of Soft On Demand (SOD) in 1995. Takahashi was able to grow SOD into a major company, from sales of 300 million yen (about $3 million) in 1996 to 6 billion yen (about $60 million) by 2001 and to 9 billion yen (about $90 million) in 2005. In 2003 the company had a staff of 180 and was generating profits of 1.5 billion yen (about $15 million) on sales from 1000 titles a year. Takahashi's plan was to increase market share and to absorb or eliminate competition from the hundreds of other AV manufacturers by producing high quality products at lower prices ("We want to spend money making good movies that we can sell cheaply") and by removing some of the stigma attached to adult products ("I want people to know that there's nothing dirty about adult videos").

In addition, Takahashi, who has been described as "strong-willed" and "out-spoken", made SOD into one of the most creative, innovative and outrageous AV companies in Japan. One of his stunts involved using a crane to raise couples on a transparent platform 20 meters into the air where they engaged in sex which climaxed in a bungee jump from the platform. Another large-scale production, All Naked Airborne F**k, filmed from a helicopter, proved to be one of his rare failures with the public but Takahashi felt that the video "showed our customers that we weren't afraid to spend the dough on making a good flick".

=== Agriculture ===
Takahashi retired from SOD at the end of fiscal year 2005 (March) and used the 1 billion yen (about $10 million) "golden handshake" he received to purchase a farm in suburban Tokyo which would provide fresh produce to be served at his nearby restaurant. He traveled to farms all over Japan to learn the business, and noted: "Everybody who works for me is an idiot, who keeps saying how things can't be done instead of using their heads and trying to work out the ways things can be done".

Takahashi started his new company "National Farm" (国立ファーム) in 2006 with the goal of trying to improve farm products saying that years of government subsidies had discouraged farmers - "The farmers are not rewarded for producing better agricultural products". Takahashi's solution was to support new farming techniques and to encourage farmers by opening a series of restaurants buying fresh vegetable produce directly from farmers. A second restaurant was opened in the Roppongi district of Tokyo in November 2008.

=== Other activities ===
After leaving SOD, he made one more foray into the AV business for the 2007 AV Open contest. His entry, Making AV Debut Without Being Nude (絶対にAVには出ません！というグラビアアイドルを「君なら裸にならないAV女優になれる」と口説いてAVに出てもらいました) [OPEN-0719] starring Mao Hirai, was made under the label of his first restaurant "Kunitachi Farm". The video finished in 5th place in the competition.

Takahashi is married and has children. When SOD announced plans in 2004 to produce an adaptation of the Shougakukan Big Comic Original manga series Ajisai no Uta (Song of Hydrangea) as an original video animation (OVA), Takahashi said he started the project because he and his wife both enjoyed the manga and he wanted to make something his 6-year-old son could enjoy.

Along with AV actresses Nao Oikawa and Mariko Kawana, actor Taka Kato, and director Goro Tameike, Takahashi was interviewed for Misato Nakayama's study of professionals in the adult industry, 性職者の人々 あの世界の仕事師たち (Sei Shoku Sha No Hitobito Ano Sekai No Shigotoshi Tachi), which was published in January 2006 by Ohzora (ISBN 4-7767-9229-X).

== Bibliography ==
- Jibu, Renge: Profile: Ganari Takahashi president of a pornography video maker Nikkei Business 2002/12/9, pp. 122–124.
