= Japan Contents Review Center =

Japanese video and video game rating organization

- 日本コンテンツ審査センター
- Pronunciation: Nihon Kontentsu Shinsa Sentā
- Predecessor: Nihon Ethics of Video Association; Content Soft Association
- Formation: December 1, 2010; 15 years ago
- Type: self-regulatory
- Purpose: Ensuring adult videos and games adhere to Japanese obscenity laws
- Headquarters: Shinjuku, Tokyo, Japan
- Location: Japan
- Region served: Japan
- Website: jcrc.or.jp
- Formerly called: Ethics Organization of Video

The Japan Contents Review Center (JCRC) (日本コンテンツ審査センター, Nihon Kontentsu Shinsa Sentā) is a Japanese video and game rating organization. It is a voluntary organization to ensure adherence to Japanese obscenity laws, which prohibit any display of genitals. This is accomplished by a mosaic pixelation applied to videos and games being sold in Japan.

== History ==
JCRC was founded on December 1, 2010 as Ethics Organization of Video (映像倫理機構, Eizō Rinri Kikō) after the dissolution of both the Nihon Ethics of Video Association (NEVA) and the Content Soft Association (CSA).

JCRC was interviewed by the organization Human Rights Now (HRN) about its policies.
