= Kaoru Kuroki =

Japanese pornographic actress

- 黒木香
- Born: 21 January 1965 (age 61); Kanoya, Kagoshima, Japan
- Education: Yokohama National University
- Occupation: adult video performer
- Years active: 1986-94
- Height: 1.61 m (5 ft 3 in)

Kaoru Kuroki (黒木香, Kuroki Kaoru; born 21 January 1965) is a Japanese former adult video performer and a multi-media personality. Her role as a media counselor expressing outspoken views on sex and society have drawn comparisons to Cicciolina, sex therapist Dr. Ruth, and actress Linda Lovelace.

== Life and career ==
=== Early life ===
Kaoru Kuroki (whose stage name translates to "Fragrant Blacktree") was born to a conservative, comfortably middle-class family. The daughter of an engineer, Kuroki was a naturally gifted child and showed artistic talent from an early age. She left public school at the age of 15 to attend art college, and later studied Renaissance art history at Yokohama National University.

While still attending Yokohama National University, Kuroki began appearing in adult videos (AVs), at first considering this to be another form of art. "I wanted to approach it purely as a performance art form, but it turned out to be a lot crazier than that. In fact, if I'd continued to see porno video as art without also acknowledging it as just a fuck film, I wouldn't have gone this far."

She expresses admiration for the films of Nagisa Oshima, Ingmar Bergman, and Bernardo Bertolucci, but, while she continues to view her AV performances as a social mission, she contrasts the AV with film. She says the AV "has a different atmosphere. It's not very sophisticated, in fact it's primitive. It's a bit like eating and menus in restaurants: you're hungry and you have a sudden craving for noodles, so you go and eat noodles. Your appetite is towards a porno video, so you go and rent whatever turns you on. And as with food, viewers can use basic ingredients to 'cook' the desired stimulation from the video themselves."

=== AV debut ===
Kuroki's adult video debut was SM Poi no suki (SMぽいの好き), released in October 1986 by the major AV company Crystal-Eizou, under the innovative AV director and former porn actor, Toru Muranishi. Muranishi is credited as one of the creators of the documentary style often emulated in Japanese AVs. Kuroki, sharing Muranishi's opinion that the AV should have a documentary quality, continued to work with him when he left Crystal-Eizou to found his own company, Diamond Visual. Her videos for Muranishi usually began with her seated, sharply dressed, and addressing the camera in an improvised talk on a subject like sexual liberation. This would typically be followed by a modeling segment, either nude or in a swimsuit. The remaining video footage would be taken up with various sexual performances, often involving S&M.

Regarding the sex scenes, Bornoff states, "the peripherals in a Kuroki video are fairly violent stuff. She oscillates between abused sexual slave and the epitome of self-assertion with schizophrenic rapidity. To some, the documentary makes for a jarring experience; the feedback she gets from viewers can be surprising. Some say they almost find her frightening; that they can't get a hard-on."

Kuroki responds, "The men who find my videos frightening often recognize the wilder, more uninhibited side of their own girlfriends. In order to liberate themselves, they must first take off their armour. If a man recognizes Kuroki in his wife or girlfriend, he is forced to strip it off in order to deal with her. That's how I liberate both sexes."

=== Mainstream breakthrough ===
Kuroki was engaged in video and magazine appearances typical to being an AV model when she caught the attention of the mainstream media in 1988. Her decision to stop shaving her under-arm hair, as a symbolic protest against Japan's long-standing censorship of the depiction of pubic hair in print or film, gained Kuroki interviews with the mainstream media. Kuroki concedes that her decision to stop shaving her under-arms worked as a gimmick to help set her apart from the mass of AV girls, but considers it also an expression of femininity and identity. Impressed by her ability to speak intelligently and matter-of-factly about subjects normally considered unmentionable, late-night talk shows began inviting Kuroki as a guest. Soon she had become a popular daytime TV panellist, was appearing in commercials, and served as a large department store's campaign girl. While she was popular with her male audience for her AV appearances, she also appealed to a female audience by expressing feminist view on daytime television. In addition to TV talk shows, Kuroki also had a role in the TV Asahi costume drama Shigotonin, Kyōto e Iku Yamiuchinin no Nazo no Shuryō (必殺スペシャル春一番 仕事人、京都へ行く 闇討人の謎の首領！) which was broadcast on March 3, 1989.

Reflecting on her popularity, unprecedented for an AV model up to that time, Kuroki points out that there was a social need for someone like her. "I talk about life as a woman, but with my background, obviously the focus is on sex. I seem to have become a spokeswoman for the too many women who are embarrassed to talk about it."

In 1988 Kuroki visited Italy where she met Cicciolina, whom she regards as sensei. She was pleased to find that many of their opinions coincided, but was surprised by Cicciolina's discomfort with Kuroki's masochistic tendencies and preference for the S&M genre. Kuroki attributes this to cultural and personal differences, and does not feel that S&M equates to submissiveness. Indeed, Fornander points out that Kuroki made AVs in general, and S&M in particular a feminist issue in Japan.

In March 1989, Kuroki teamed with Diamond Visual's new AV star, Kimiko Matsuzaka in the adult video 1107 Millimeter Impression (1107(いいおんな)の感動). Later in 1989, in two entries of Diamond Visual's How to Sex - Sexual Information series of instructional sex videos, Kuroki served as the instructor/lecturer with Matsuzaka performing the physical demonstrations. Kuroki and Matsuzaka were brought together again in Toru Muranishi's December 1990 pink film, Daikyonyuu: Noshikakaru (大巨乳 のしかかる), for Xces.

After Matsuzaka's retirement from AV appearances in 1990, Kuroki also appeared with Matsuzaka at the Akasaka club, "Mirukuhooru" ("Milk Hall").

== Retirement and legacy ==
Kuroki retired from public life in 1994. In a 1994 interview, Kuroki said that she suffered physical violence from Muranishi shortly before her retirement. In the January 2002 issue of the magazine Josei Seven, and the January 2004 issue of Shukan Post, stories and pictures on Kuroki's private life were printed. Kuroki claimed that as an ordinary citizen no longer in the public eye, the magazines needed her permission to print these stories. Kuroki sued the publisher, Shogakukan, for 22 million yen for invasion of privacy. In April 2007, the presiding judge ruled the articles illegal and awarded Kuroki 1.7 million yen (about $14,000). Shogakukan was reportedly considering appealing the decision.

At the height of her popularity, Kuroki's AVs were averaging 17,000 sales a piece, a huge amount by industry standards, exceeding a million dollars. According to Rosemary Iwamura, "Kaoru changed the image of AV girls; she didn't seem to be making videos because of a lack of options but rather as an informed choice." For bringing the AV industry to the attention of mainstream media in Japan, as well as her polite but frank outspokenness on subjects like sex and censorship, Kjell Fornander calls her "the first high-profile AV actress." She permanently changed the way that the AV industry and AV actresses were viewed by the general public in Japan.

Kuroki's life is portrayed in Netflix's show The Naked Director, where she is portrayed by actress Misato Morita.

== Sources ==
- Adachi, Noriyuki (1992). アダルトな人びと - Adaruto na Hitobito ("Adult" People) (in Japanese). Tokyo: Kodansha. ISBN 4-06-205546-5.
- Bornoff, Nicholas (1994) [1991]. "Bye-Bye Pink Cinema, Hello Adult Video". Pink Samurai: An Erotic Exploration of Japanese Society; The Pursuit and Politics of Sex in Japan (Paperback ed.). London: HarperCollins. ISBN 0-586-20576-4.
- "Ex-porn star wins settlement in Japan". Mainichi Shimbun. April 14, 2007. Alt URL
- Fornander, Kjell (July 1992). "A Star is Porn". Tokyo Journal. Archived from the original on 2006-05-16.
- Iwamura, Rosemary (1994). "Letter from Japan: From Girls Who Dress Up Like Boys To Trussed-up Porn Stars - Some of the Contemporary Heroines on the Japanese Screen". Continuum: The Australian Journal of Media & Culture, vol. 7 no. 2. Archived from the original on 2007-05-03.
- "黒木香 (Kuroki Kaoru)" (in Japanese). JMDB.
- "黒木 香 - Kuroki Kaoru" (in Japanese). 'Web I-dic' (Idol Dictionary). Archived from the original on 2016-03-03.
- "黒木香さんの記事「プライバシー侵害」２２０万賠償命令 (article on privacy suit)" (in Japanese). www.zakzak.co.jp. 2006-05-24. Archived from the original on 2017-09-08.
