= Nihon Ethics of Video Association =

Japanese video rating organization

- 日本ビデオ倫理協会
- Pronunciation: Nippon Bideo Rinri Kyōkai
- Successor: Ethics Organization of Video
- Formation: February 1972; 54 years ago
- Dissolved: November 2010; 16 years ago
- Type: self-regulatory
- Purpose: Ensuring adult videos adhere to Japanese obscenity laws
- Headquarters: Chūō, Tokyo, Japan
- Location: Japan
- Region served: Japan
- Website: viderin.jp

The Nihon Ethics of Video Association (NEVA) (日本ビデオ倫理協会, Nippon Bideo Rinri Kyōkai; "Japan Video Morality Association"), usually abbreviated as Viderin (official) or Biderin (both: ビデ倫), was a Japanese video rating organization. It was a voluntary organization to ensure adherence to Japanese obscenity laws, which prohibit any display of genitals. This is accomplished by a mosaic pixelation that is applied to videos for sale in Japan, and the NEVA seal is placed on all videos produced by member studios, which included the larger and older adult video studios in Japan—including h.m.p., Kuki Inc., and Alice Japan, which belonged to NEVA.

== History ==
NEVA was founded in 1972 by Toei Video, Nikkatsu, and Japan Vicotte as the Adult Video Voluntary Regulatory Ethics Committee (成人ビデオ自主規制倫理懇談会, Seijin Bideo Jishu Kisei Rinri Kondan-kai), Its headquarters were in the Chūō ward of Tokyo. The organization began using its latest name in January 1977.

NEVA was dissolved in November 2010, and a new organization, Ethics Organization of Video took its place. The new organization is currently known as the Japan contents Review Center.

== Controversy ==
In June 2007, some restrictions (such as showing pubic hair) were lifted by NEVA.

In response, on August 23, 2007, the Tokyo Metropolitan police raided the offices of NEVA and several AV studios (including h.m.p.) and confiscated videos as part of an investigation of video producers and distributors suspected of distributing obscene material depicting genitals. At the beginning of March 2008, five members of NEVA, including Hiroyuki Gorogawa (五郎川 弘之), the former C.E.O. of h.m.p., one of the board members of NEVA and the head of the inspection division, were arrested for the sale and distribution of indecent material because the digital mosaic used was too revealing. In April 2008, NEVA announced it would be forming a new organization to provide reforms and uniform screening practices for videos.

== See also ==
- Censorship in Japan
- Computer Entertainment Rating Organization—a Japanese rating group for video games
- Content Soft Association (formerly the Media Ethics Association ("Medirin"))—a competing video (and video game) rating organization
- Eirin—the Japanese film rating organization
- Japan Video Production Software - Sales Ethics Group (JVPS)—a competing video rating organization
- Motion picture rating system
- Pornography in Japan
- Video game content rating system#Japan
