= The Naked Director =

Japanese television series

- Promotional release poster
- Genre: Comedy drama; Period drama
- Based on: Zenra Kantoku Muranishi Toru Den by Nobuhiro Motohashi
- Directed by: Masaharu Take (lead); Eiji Uchida; Hayato Kawai
- Starring: Takayuki Yamada; Shinnosuke Mitsushima; Tetsuji Tamayama; Misato Morita; Jun Kunimura; Lily Franky; Ryo Ishibashi
- Composer: Taisei Iwasaki
- Country of origin: Japan
- Original language: Japanese
- No. of seasons: 2
- No. of episodes: 16

Production
- Executive producers: Kaata Sakamoto; Taro Goto; Masaharu Take
- Producers: Yasuhito Tachibana; Hiroyuki Akune
- Cinematography: Hideo Yamamoto
- Editor: Zensuke Hori
- Camera setup: Single-camera
- Running time: 39–54 minutes
- Production company: Django Films

Original release
- Network: Netflix
- Release: August 8, 2019 – June 24, 2021

The Naked Director (Japanese: 全裸監督, Hepburn: Zenra Kantoku) is a Japanese semi-biographical comedy-drama television series co-directed by Masaharu Take. Based on the biography Zenra Kantoku Muranishi Tōru Den (全裸監督 村西とおる伝) by Nobuhiro Motohashi, it tells the story of Japanese adult video director Toru Muranishi.

The series premiered on Netflix on August 8, 2019. It stars Takayuki Yamada as Muranishi, alongside Shinnosuke Mitsushima and Tetsuji Tamayama. On August 15, 2019, Netflix renewed the series for a second season, which premiered on June 24, 2021.

== Synopsis ==
The Naked Director follows the story of "Muranishi's unusual and dramatic life filled with big ambitions as well as spectacular setbacks in his attempt to turn Japan's porn industry on its head."

== Cast and characters ==
- Takayuki Yamada as Toru Muranishi
- Shinnosuke Mitsushima as Toshi Arai
- Tetsuji Tamayama as Kenji Kawada
- Ryo Ishibashi as Eigo Ikezawa, head of the largest adult video studio
- Lily Franky as Michiro Takei, a high-ranking police officer
- Misato Morita as Megumi Sahara/Kaoru Kuroki, based on a real AV actress
- Jun Kunimura as Iori Furuya, head of Furuya Gang of the Tosho Syndicate of the yakuza
- Takenori Goto as "Rugby" Goto
- Tokio Emoto as Kosuke Mitamura
- Sairi Ito as Junko Koseda
- Koyuki as Kayo Sahara, Megumi's mother
- Kimiko Yo as Kozue Muranishi, Toru's mother
- Pierre Taki as Atsushi Wada
- Mariya Nishiuchi as Sayaka
- Yuri Tsunematsu as Miyuki Chiba/Mariko Nogi (season 2)
- Nanami Kawakami as Miku
- Ami Tomite as Naoko Yamamoto
- Yuka Masuda as Roma Edogawa
- Show Kasamatsu as Ogiwara, one of Iori Furuya's henchmen
- Takato Yonemoto as Jimmy
- Harmeet Obhrai as Abdallah
- Itsuji Itao as Ono
- Tsuyoshi Ihara as Koichi Umino, CEO of Satellite East
- Renji Ishibashi as Watabe, chairman of the board of the conglomerate that owns Satellite East
- Rie Miyazawa as Ms. Takamiya, successor to Takamiya Group
- Eisaku Yoshida as Akira Honda (investment banker)
- Jade Albany Pietrantonio as Allison Mandy (season 1)
- Ruri Shinato as Sachiko (Toru Muranishi's first wife)

=== English version dubbing cast ===
- James McCauley as Toru Muranishi
- David Blue as Toshi Arai
- Christopher Swindle as Ikezawa
- Eric Tiede as Kawada
- JJ Dunlap as "Rugby"
- Curt Mega as Kosuke Mitamura
- Siera Casey as Junko
- Keith Silverstein as Takei
- Maurice LaMarche as Furuya
- Miranda Parkin as Naoko
- Mark Hildreth as Ono
- Mimi Torres as Miku
- Dahlia Salem as Kayo

== Episodes ==
=== Series overview ===
Season	Episodes	Originally released
1	8	August 8, 2019
2	8	June 24, 2021

=== Season 1 (2019) ===
No. overall	No. in season	Title	Directed by	Written by	Original release date
1	1	"The Hidden Side" (Japanese: 裏の世界)	Masaharu Take	Yoshitatsu Yamada, Eiji Uchida, Kosuke Nishi & Kana Yamada	August 8, 2019
On the verge of losing his job in 1980 Sapporo, Toru Muranishi finally finds his knack selling English encyclopedias after learning from a senior salesman. However, he discovers his wife sleeping with another man as he fails to satisfy her sexually. He then partners up with Toshi, a peddler of audio recordings featuring unsuspecting couples having sex at a hotel, to utilize his salesman skills.
2	2	"Uncensored" (Japanese: 無修正)	Eiji Uchida	Yoshitatsu Yamada, Kosuke Nishi & Kana Yamada	August 8, 2019
Muranishi and Toshi decide to start selling binibon, explicit magazines enclosed in plastic bags, and open up their own chain of bookstores throughout Hokkaido. However, they then partner with a man named Kawada to publish their own uncensored magazine, which is illegal in Japan. Although they initially pay the police off with bribes, cops eventually try to arrest Muranishi at his house, but he escapes.
3	3	"Shake Things Up" (Japanese: ひっくり返すんだよ)	Masaharu Take	Eiji Uchida, Yoshitatsu Yamada & Kosuke Nishi	August 8, 2019
Muranishi and Toshi managed to keep their company running while on the run from the police. However, after returning to Sapporo in 1982, they are arrested after being set up by their employees. Upon being released and seeing the success of videocassette recorders and adult videos, they reunite with Kawada and decide to make their own videos in 1984 Tokyo.
4	4	"The Real Thing" (Japanese: 本物)	Eiji Uchida	Yoshitatsu Yamada & Kosuke Nishi	August 8, 2019
After learning that Ikezawa had him arrested, Muranishi steals an actress from his company to star in a film based on Muranishi's own sexual encounter. It is made with the actors having unsimulated sex, which had previously been uncommon in Japanese over the counter videos. Ikezawa has the actress arrested and Muranishi's company, Sapphire Pictures, blacklisted in the industry.
5	5	"Blossoming" (Japanese: 開花)	Masaharu Take	Yoshitatsu Yamada, Eiji Uchida & Kosuke Nishi	August 8, 2019
Things are looking even more grim for Muranishi and Sapphire when Ikezawa and other adult video companies form the Nihon Ethics of Video Association(NEVA) to self-regulate the industry. However, the young Megumi contacts him wanting to star in a film after liberating herself from her strict mother. That same day Muranishi makes an unconventional porno with her under the stage name Kaoru Kuroki, utilizing a whistle, sadomasochism and himself as her co-star. However, Megumi's mother enlists the commission and sues, with Muranishi willingly agreeing to stop sale of the tape.
6	6	"Delusions of Grandeur" (Japanese: 誇大妄想)	Hayato Kawai	Kosuke Nishi, Yoshitatsu Yamada & Eiji Uchida	August 8, 2019
In a last ditch effort to save Sapphire Pictures, Muranishi and his crew travel to Hawaii to film a Hollywood-like action porno with Western porn star Allison Mandy. The project was financed by Megumi returning her payment for her recalled debut film. However, the Japanese crew are arrested by the FBI at the wrap party.
7	7	"Don't Dream It's Over" (Japanese: 終わっちゃいない)	Hayato Kawai	Kosuke Nishi, Yoshitatsu Yamada & Eiji Uchida	August 8, 2019
In order to raise bail money for Muranishi, who was arrested on false visa fraud charges, Toshi has Furuya sell an uncensored version of their first film without telling the others, but in exchange must get involved in the yakuza life himself. At the same time, Megumi helps by allowing the legal sale of her debut film and publicly promoting it.
8	8	"A Sexual Revolution" (Japanese: 性革命)	Hayato Kawai	Kosuke Nishi, Yoshitatsu Yamada & Eiji Uchida	August 8, 2019
Now famous, Megumi makes regular TV appearances giving her outspoken views on sex and society, with Muranishi eventually joining her. Due to Sapphire's success, the video commission lifts the ban on their videos and loosens their regulations to allow unsimulated sex. Toshi has become addicted to drugs, is put in charge of Furuya's uncensored porn racket, and is fired from Sapphire. He and Ikezawa are then arrested as the police crack down on crime at the end of the Shōwa era. Ikezawa commits suicide in jail, while Toshi is warmly greeted by Furuya upon his release and Sapphire Pictures expands as the new leaders of porn.

=== Season 2 (2021) ===
No. overall	No. in season	Title	Directed by	Written by	Original release date
9	1	"Sex Will Come Raining Down" (Japanese: 宇宙からエロが降る)	Masaharu Take	Izumi Kawasaki, Kazuhisa Kotera & Takamasa Oe	June 24, 2021
The year is 1990, and Muranishi is riding high. When his investment banker Akira Honda introduces him to the concept of satellite TV, he finds his next big thing. However, Koichi Umino, CEO of Satellite East that holds satellite broadcasting rights, refuses to engage.
10	2	"More, More, More" (Japanese: もっともっともっと)	Kôtarô Gotô	Izumi Kawasaki, Kazuhisa Kotera & Takamasa Oe	June 24, 2021
To raise money for a satellite channel, Muranishi starts cranking out videos and pushing boundaries, but he ends up neglecting Kaoru, his biggest star. Kosuke Mitamura is tasked with shooting scenes with Naoko Yamamoto, after "Rugby" Goto needs more time to recover from his refractory period. Due to Mitamura's premature ejaculation on Naoko's face, Muranishi exploits that into a new genre facial shower.
11	3	"Diamond in the Rough" (Japanese: ダイヤモンドの原石)	Kôtarô Gotô	Izumi Kawasaki, Kazuhisa Kotera & Takamasa Oe	June 24, 2021
Sapphire Pictures is rebranded into the more upscale Diamond Visual. A shy woman named Miyuki responds to a casting call and winds up shadowing Kaoru.
12	4	"Our Dream" (Japanese: 二人の夢)	Masaharu Take	Izumi Kawasaki, Kazuhisa Kotera & Takamasa Oe	June 24, 2021
Kaoru enthusiastically promotes her upcoming video. Umino finally gives his nod regarding the satellite broadcast rights deal, after the new Takamiya Group successor adores Muranishi and agrees to work together with the other four companies spearheaded by Umino's boss Watabe in supporting Japanese space program. Miyuki is nervous about her debut.
13	5	"The Bubble Bursts" (Japanese: 崩壊)	Kôtarô Gotô	Izumi Kawasaki, Kazuhisa Kotera & Takamasa Oe	June 24, 2021
Muranishi gives Miyuki a new name: Mariko Nogi. But Diamond is running out of money and, as the bubble economy bursts, they have to find new revenues.
14	6	"Out of Control" (Japanese: 暴走)	Masaharu Take	Izumi Kawasaki, Kazuhisa Kotera & Takamasa Oe	June 24, 2021
While the Diamond staff fume, Muranishi desperately searches for a way to make the next satellite payment and keep the business afloat. Umino refuses to help Muranishi by citing his own loss of 30 billion Japanese yen at launching satellite rocket says he will soon quit his company too.
15	7	"The Fall" (Japanese: 奇想転落)	Masaharu Take	Izumi Kawasaki, Kazuhisa Kotera & Takamasa Oe	June 24, 2021
Kaoru is hospitalized after attempting suicide by jumping off the balcony. Inspired by industry changes, Wada recruits Toshi, Kawada and Mitamura to make videos for his chain. Muranishi's debt comes due. Anti-Yakuza Act in 1992 is soon to be implemented.
16	8	"The Will of a Stone" (Japanese: 石の意志)	Masaharu Take	Izumi Kawasaki, Kazuhisa Kotera & Takamasa Oe	June 24, 2021
Having been unable to shoot Muranishi, Toshi takes matters with the yakuza into his own hands by killing Iori Furuya at his office instead, while being stabbed to death by Iori's henchman Ogiwara. The other Diamond staff members move on with their lives. Kosuke Mitamura continues to direct porn featuring "Rugby" Goto. Kaoru recovers and goes to Rome. The corrupt police officer Michiro Takei is arrested for taking bribes after escorting Ogiwara back to the police headquarters. Miyuki now lives with Muranishi who sinks lower from his glorious days.

== Production ==
=== Development ===
Executive producer Kazutaka Sakamoto came across Nobuhiro Motohashi's Zenra Kantoku Muranishi Toru Den in early 2017. A director friend of his had been trying to adapt it, but gave up and hoped Sakamoto could make it happen at Netflix. Although mainly taking place in the 1980s, Netflix expected it to be universal and relevant to contemporary viewers, and that it be a compelling underdog story. After the production was green-lit, Sakamoto brought in Jason George, a producer on the Netflix series Narcos, as a consultant. He wanted George's advice on depicting an outlaw character that viewers can empathize with and how to make sure the sex scenes would not come across as gratuitous or disrespectful to women. The discussions were so fruitful that Sakamoto had George supervise the script too.

On October 25, 2018, it was announced that Netflix had given the production a series order for a first season consisting of eight episodes. It was the first production for Netflix's Japanese branch. The series is co-directed by Masaharu Take and co-written by Kosuke Nishi, Yoshitatsu Yamada and Eiji Uchida. Mark Schilling reported that with "a generous (but undisclosed) budget", the writing team spent nearly a year crafting the script. The Nikkei reported that The Naked Director is estimated to have cost 100 million yen per episode, in contrast to most Japanese TV shows which cost tens of millions of yen per episode.

Take stated that without Netflix, the project would not have been realized as it would have been hard to get it on Japanese television. He said that the story is a mix of true story and fiction, as Muranishi told them they could be as free with the facts as they wanted as long as it was interesting. Uchida wrote "I believe that Japanese films have to change. They have to look outward and overseas. This series was made with just that thought in mind."

On August 15, 2019, the series was renewed by Netflix for a second season. In January 2020, The Nikkei wrote that the season would follow Muranishi's downfall, mirroring Japan's economic slump of the early 1990s. The second season was released on June 24, 2021.

=== Casting ===
Alongside the initial series announcement, it was confirmed that Takayuki Yamada, Shinnosuke Mitsushima and Tetsuji Tamayama would star in the series. Take revealed that Yamada was attached to the show from the very beginning, and said that Misato Morita "totally became Kuroki in her mind. She didn't resemble her, but her voice became exactly the same." In July 2019, it was announced that Jade Albany Pietrantonio would star in the series.

=== Filming ===
Principal photography for the first season took place in 2018. In January 2020, The Nikkei reported that production for season two would begin in the spring.

== Release ==
=== Marketing ===
On June 25, 2019, the official trailer for the series was released.

== Reception ==
HuffPost columnist Soichiro Matsutani called the first season of The Naked Director a "masterpiece" and compared it to the acclaimed films The People vs. Larry Flynt and Boogie Nights. He praised the show's depiction of the early days of Japan's adult video industry, particularly how it showed the connections between the AV industry, the criminal underworld, and the police, something the original book did not. Another difference from the source material that Matsutani noted, is how the porn industry is never portrayed as a bright and glamorous world; it features characters who suffer from the social stigma often directed at those who work in the profession.

Describing the show as a "raucous sex comedy and action-packed underworld narrative in [a] tale of a pornographic revolution," Brenden Gallagher of The Daily Dot gave The Naked Director 3 1/2 out of 5 stars. He praised the show for immersing the audience in Japanese culture, Yamada's performance, and the writing for melding humor and emotion. However, he criticized some of the supporting cast for being unable to balance the seriousness and humor. Unlike Gallagher however, The Daily Beast's Jordan Julian called the show's switching between comedy and drama "whiplash-inducing at times" but said as the season progresses it begins to "feel more like a crime show than anything else—a Japanese interpretation of Breaking Bad." John Serba of Decider called the first episode "funny and colorful", Yamada a strong lead, and the supporting cast "mostly inspired", and recommended the show. Both Serba and Gallagher compared The Naked Director to Californication.

Reviewing season two for Thrillist, Joshua Robinson called it "A Whirlwind Of Brilliant Highs & Overindulgent Lows". Although praising Yamada's "spirited—and at times, villainous—performance" as absolutely brilliant, he wrote that "The novelty and shock value of the comedic drama has faded away, despite the show's poignant storylines, and many of the show's best characters have either died or moved on from the world of porn when it's all said and done."

Masae Ido of Gendai Business criticized the series for depicting Muranishi as a sexual liberator and advocate for women despite his real-life opinions, such as a tweet that said "The female lawyers who spearhead the feminist movement on the porn coercion issue all look like they attract no men", which she found "divergent" from the depiction. Iku Okada of Newsweek Japan found advertisements for the series to be "glorifying the sex industry of a time when unjust exploitation was commonplace", and wrote that the character of Muranishi "never reflects on his own shameful revenge or the misogyny that can be felt behind it".

The series was also criticized for depicting Kaoru Kuroki using her real stage name without her permission. In a 1994 interview, Kuroki stated that she had suffered physical violence from Muranishi. She retired from public life the same year and has successfully sued publishers for privacy infringement. When asked about the criticism, Netflix stated that neither Kuroki nor Muranishi were involved in the production and that the series is merely an adaptation of Motohashi's book.
