= Crystal-Eizou =

Japanese pornographic film company

- Industry: Pornography
- Founded: 1984
- Headquarters: Toshima, Tokyo, Japan
- Products: Pornographic films
- Number of employees: 23
- Website: www.crystal-eizou.jp

Crystal-Eizou or Crystal-Eizō (クリスタル映像), known in English as Crystal Image or Crystal Video, is a Japanese corporation involved in the production and distribution of adult videos.

== Company history ==
Crystal-Eizou was founded in October 1984 and was incorporated in June 1985 at a time when home video recorders were beginning to significantly penetrate the Japanese market and actresses were being elevated into AV Idols. A number of significant figures in Japanese adult video (AV) history have been associated with the Crystal-Eizou company during its long history. Among these was the innovative and controversial director Toru Muranishi (村西 とおる) who later left to start his own company Diamond Visual. Muranishi launched the career of Kaoru Kuroki who debuted at Crystal-Eizou in October 1986 and went on to become Japan's "first high-profile AV actress". Kuroki left Crystal-Eizou to join Muranishi at his new company but a few years later the company found another main draw in Ai Iijima who debuted with them in 1992 and soon became acknowledged as the top AV actress of her time. Another early AV Idol who performed for Crystal-Eizou was Yumika Hayashi who appeared as early as 1989 in the video Gansha 6 renpatsu! gaburi hime Hayashi Yumika. The company inaugurated a major new label, Venus, in June 1997.

By December 2007, the company had 23 employees and a capital of 200 million yen (about $2 million) with an annual revenue of 2.6 billion yen (about $26 million). The company President is Tadaharu Nishimura (西村忠治) and the corporation headquarters are in Tokyo's Toshima ward. Crystal-Eizou operates its own website, Crystal-Online, where DVDs are sold and streaming videos are available through membership. Their video products are also available in a large network of dealers throughout Japan. The website also contains an archive of Crystal-Eizou actress interviews dating back to 2001. The company specializes in single actress featured videos and "big-bust" genre productions.

== JVPS ==
As one of the older Japanese AV companies, Crystal-Eizou is counted as one of the "pro" studios as opposed to the more recent "indie" companies. Japanese AV producers belong to one of a number of voluntary ethics organizations which set standards for content and the extent of the mosaic pixelation used to censor the genitals required by Japanese law. Crystal-Eizou and most of the older "pro" studios such as h.m.p., Kuki and Alice Japan belonged to the group known as Nihon Ethics of Video Association (NEVA, AKA "Soft-rin" and "Viderin") whose censorship standards were more conservative than those used by the "indie" studios. However, in 2005 Crystal-Eizou left the organization to form its own ethics group—the Japan Video Production Software - Sales Ethics Group (JVPS) or in Japanese 日本映像ソフト制作・販売倫理機構 (Nippon Eizou Sofuto Seisaku. Hanbai Rinri Kikou). The executive director of the Tokyo-based organization is Crystal-Eizou President Tadaharu Nishimura.

== Awards ==
At the 4th Takeshi Kitano Awards held in 2003 for movies released in 2002, the Crystal-Eizou production Battle Without Foreplay? (前戯なき戦い?即入かましてﾖｶですか?) was given the award as the Best AV Title. In 2007 Crystal-Eizou took part in the second AV Open contest. Their entry Celebrity Debut - Misa Kikoden (芸能人★デビュー！！ きこうでんみさ) directed by Yukihiko Shimamura and labeled OPEN-0706 won the 2nd Place Award in the main contest.

== Labels ==
Crystal-Eizou has issued videos on various labels over the years:

- Venus (ヴィーナス)
- Grace (グレース)
- Madam Maniac (マダムマニアック)
- Maniac (マニアック)
- Messiah (メシア)
- Great Confidence (グレートコンフィデンス)
- Fan (ファン)

- Super
- Crystal EX
- MMC
- e-KiSS
- Hermes (エルメス)
- Five Star

== Actresses ==
A number of prominent AV Idols have been featured in Crystal-Eizou videos during the company's extensive history:

- Maria Dizon
- Shoko Goto
- Hitomi Hayasaka
- Yumika Hayashi
- Hikari Hino
- Ai Iijima
- Sakurako Kaoru
- Kaoru Kuroki
- Marina Matsushima
- Maria Misato
- Anna Mizuki
- Momoka Nishina
- Anna Ohura
- Maria Ozawa
- Maria Yumeno

== Series ==
- The Costume Play Maid (コスプレ召使い)
