= J-List =

Japanese retailer

J-List Co., Ltd. 有限会社ジェイ・リスト
- Company type: Yūgen Gaisha
- Industry: Online retail, localization
- Founded: 1996
- Founder: Peter Payne
- Headquarters: Gunma Prefecture, Japan
- Divisions: JBOX; J-18 Publishing
- Website: jlist.com (NSFW) jbox.com

J-List is an online retailer of Japanese goods for consumers outside Japan, mainly otaku goods, anime, and manga. The company was established by American Peter Payne in 1996. Its head office is located in Isesaki, Gunma, Japan. JBOX is a division of J-List.

J-List also translates and publishes physical hentai doujinshi, art books, and tankōbon in English through its sister company, J18 Publishing.
