= Masato Ishioka =

Japanese film director and screenwriter

- Born: 1960 (age 65–66); Shizuoka Prefecture, Japan
- Occupations: Film director Screenwriter

Masato Ishioka (石岡正人, Ishioka Masato) is a Japanese director, screenwriter and business executive who had an early career as an adult video (AV) director.

== Life and career ==
Masato Ishioka was born in 1960 in Shizuoka Prefecture, Japan. He attended Meiji University, graduating in 1983 with a major in Politics and Economics. In 1984 he began working as an apprentice to Tadashi Yoyogi at the AV studio Athena Eizou. He stayed at the studio for six years as an assistant director and video production manager. In August 1986 he was assistant director for Hikaru Kitoh (鬼闘光), a co-founder of Athena Eizou, in the Nikkatsu film The Orgasm (ザ・絶頂感, Za Zecchokan).

By the mid-1990s, Ishioka was working as a director in the softcore V-cinema field, including directing three entries in the Chikan hakusho (痴漢白書) series for the Pink Pineapple (ピンクパイナップル) company. At the same time, he was also involved as a director in the hardcore AV business, working for Athena Eizou and the Atlas21 studio including several videos in the "Violent Lips" series. In 1996, Ishioka founded his own video production company, Gold View Company Ltd, to produce and sell mainstream movies in Japan and abroad for himself and other directors.

Ishioka's experience in the AV world was used to good advantage in his first mainstream film feature Scoutman, also known as Pain, which he wrote and directed. The movie, filmed in 2000 and released in Japan in 2001, depicts the struggles of a young couple newly arrived in Tokyo who eventually become involved in the sex industry. Two veterans of the AV scene, former actress Yuri Komuro and director Kei Morikawa have roles in the film. The film won Ishioka the Directors Guild of Japan New Directors Award for 2001 as well as the Directors' Week Special Jury Award at Fantasporto.

Ishioka's second feature was another look at the dark side of Japanese society, the 2004 omnibus film Tokyo Noir (ＴＯＫＹＯ ＮＯＩＲ トウキョーノワール) where he shared writing and directing credits with Naoto Kumazawa. The trio of stories looks at the lives of three women working in the Tokyo sex industry. One reviewer calls the collaboration "emotionally rewarding". In addition to his endeavors in mainstream film, Ishioka continued working in the AV industry in the early-2000s, making videos for Athena Eizou, Atlas21, and Try-Heart where he directed AV Idol Honoka in two of her early videos in 2004.

By the late 2000s, Ishioka's company Gold View had distributed a number of films in a variety of genres among which were A (1998), Visitor Q (2001), 9 Souls (2003), Haze (2005), It's Only Talk (2005), Zombie Self-Defense Force (2006) and Reigo, the Deep-Sea Monster vs. the Battleship Yamato (2008). Ishioka's third mainstream film was the documentary Yoyochu in the Land of the Rising Sex (YOYOCHU SEXと代々木忠の世界, Yoyochu: Sex to Yoyogi Tadashi no sekai) released in Japan in 2011. In this film, through a series of interviews, Ishioka looked at the life and career of his former mentor Tadashi Yoyogi, known as the "father of adult video." Ishioka spoke with Yoyogi ("Yoyochu" was a nickname) and others who had worked with him over the years including actress Kyōko Aizome, actor Taka Kato and fellow director Hikaru Kitoh. The film premiered at the International Rome Film Festival on October 30, 2010 and was released in Japan on January 22, 2011.

Ishioka's July 2012 film Animation Maestro GISABURO (アニメ師・杉井ギサブロー, Anime Shi: Sugii Gisaburō) was another documentary on a figure important in shaping an aspect of Japanese culture, the artist and director Gisaburō Sugii, considered one of the founders of Japanese anime. Ishioka uses interviews with key figures in anime including Sugii himself to trace both Sugii's career and the history of the Japanese animation industry. Ishioka met Sugii at Kyoto Seika University where Ishioka has been a visiting professor of film in the Faculty of Manga.

== Filmography ==
=== Theatrical films (Director) ===
- The Orgasm (ザ・絶頂感, Za Zecchokan) (1986) - Assistant Director
- Scoutman (2001)
- Tokyo Noir (ＴＯＫＹＯ ＮＯＩＲ トウキョーノワール) (2004)
- Yoyochu in the Land of the Rising Sex (YOYOCHU SEXと代々木忠の世界, Yoyochu: Sex to Yoyogi Tadashi no sekai) (2011)
- Animation Maestro GISABURO (アニメ師・杉井ギサブロー, Anime Shi: Sugii Gisaburō) (2012)

=== Adult videos (AV) (Director) ===
- All Nude Kotomi Shimada (オールヌード 嶋田琴美) (Atlas21, Aug. 1996)
- Violent Lips, Sena Wakana (激唇) (Atlas21, Dec. 1997)
- Violent Lips, Yuho Mita (Atlas21, Jan. 1999)
- Violent Lips, Kotoko Shiraishi (Atlas21, June, 1999)
- Licking Fairy, Sara Ijuin (おしゃぶり天女 伊集院さら) (Media Station, June 1999)
- Violent Lips, Fuka Sakurai (Atlas21, Mar. 2000)
- Love Century, Yuka Aizawa (Love Century 相沢優香) (Atlas21, Mar. 2001)
- Violent Lips, Koharu Tohno (Atlas21, May 2001)
- Sacred Virgin (聖処女) (Atlas21, Sept. 2001)
- Baptism Marionette (洗礼マリオネット) (Atlas21, Nov. 2001)
- Privacy (プライバシー) (Atlas21, Aug. 2002)
- Want to be Fucked by a Beautiful Lady, Akira Watase (綺麗なお姉さんに犯されたい) (Athena Eizou, Feb. 2003)
- Sexy Teacher's Secret Spot (女教師の秘蜜) (Try-Heart, Oct. 2004)
- Ugly Dream (酷夢) (Try-Heart, Nov. 2004)
- Pretty Blue, Emi Kitagawa (プリティー・ブルー 北川絵美) (Atlas21, Dec. 2004)
- Let's have Three-some!? (3Pしましょっ！？) (Try-Heart, Mar. 2005)
- Bullying Maid X Attacking Sister (メイドいじめ×妹いじり) (Try-Heart, Aug. 2005)
- Devilish Kiss (小悪魔キッス) (Try-Heart, Oct. 2005)
