= Rena Murakami =

Japanese actress and former AV idol (born 1967)

- 村上 麗奈
- Born: 25 November 1967 (age 58); Tokyo, Japan
- Other name: Tomoko Ino
- Occupations: Actress; AV idol; gravure idol; radio personality
- Height: 1.59 m (5 ft 2 1/2 in)

Rena Murakami (Japanese: 村上 麗奈, Hepburn: Murakami Rena; Cantonese Yale: Chyun1 Seung5 Lai6 Noi6) is a Japanese actress and former AV idol.

== Life and career ==
After beginning her career as a gravure idol, which included modeling for Akira Gomi, Murakami made her adult video (AV) debut in the March 1988 h.m.p. Miss Christine release, Hatsujō Kansen (発情感染). In December of her debut year she also had a role in Toei's mainstream drama release, Koiko no mainichi (恋子の毎日).

In addition to continuing her AV career, Murakami had another role in a mainstream drama, appearing in Bandai Visual's Shin dōtei monogatari: Hong Kong virgin boy (新・童貞物語 ホンコンバージンボーイ) in March 1990. Also in 1990 she appeared in pioneering pink film director/producer Kan Mukai's Code Name 348: Onna keiji sashiba (コードネーム348 女刑事 サシバ). She also had roles in a number of V-Cinema films.

Her work became popular in Hong Kong, and led to her getting roles in several Category III films of Hong Kong cinema, starting around 1991. Her most significant film there was the 1991 cult favorite, Sex and Zen. In a review of the DVD release of Sex and Zen, a reviewer described her as one of "Asian cinema's most beautiful actresses". Her last film in Hong Kong, 1/3 Lover, was released in 1993.

There was a minor scandal when news leaked that she might have had sex with the Sultan of Brunei during his visit to Japan in 1993. For several years starting in the late 1990s, she toured various strip theaters around Japan, such as the famous Asakusa Rokku-za (ロック座).

In 1997, she produced and starred in the pink film Murakami Rena: kyūkyoku meigizuma (村上麗奈 究極名器妻), through Runa Films. The film was distributed theatrically by XCes, scripted by pink film actress Kiyomi Itō, and directed by Satoru Kobayashi, director of the first pink film, Flesh Market (1962). The film was re-issued in June 2003 as 村上麗奈 極上けいれん妻.

Later, Murakami had a small part in the 2008 Japanese comedy, Serial Dad.

Since 2018, Rena Murakami has been a radio personality on a talk radio program in Osaka.

== Partial filmography ==
=== Adult Videos (AV) ===
Title	Release date	Director	Studio	Notes
Private 私小説 彩られた肉肌	1988-06-17		VIP; 5C-034	
Rena Murakami Final Ecstacy 村上麗奈ラスト・インサート 東京淫女	1988	Ryuichi Hiroki	Athena Eizou; AS-113	
Completely Lewd 淫熟	1989-01-10		Alice Japan; KA-1221	
Reiko Kiyomi Rena - Triple Horny Girls Can Not Be Patient レイコ･清美･麗奈のガマンできない娘たち トリプルエッチ	1989		h.m.p. Miss Christine; SMC-016	With Reiko Hayama & Kiyomi Azuma
Rena Murakami 村上麗奈	1993			Hong Kong
Kozenwaisetsu 4 Rena Murakami 口全ワイセツ 4 村上麗奈	1993		h.m.p. Samm; DSV-030	
History of Rena Murakami 村上麗奈HISTORY	2006-09-22	Taro Matsumoto	Atlas21; RDA06-091	Compilation of two of her VIP videos from 1988

=== Hong Kong films ===
Title	Release date	Director	Studio	Notes
Hidden Desire 我為卿狂	1991-11-15	Ho Fan 何藩	Golden Harvest	
Sex and Zen 玉蒲團之偷情寶鑑	1991-11-30	Michael Mak	Golden Harvest	
Escape from Brothel 花街狂奔	1992-02-29	Wang Lung-wei	Chinachem Cinema Circuit 華懋	
Unforgetful Holiday 三級七日情	1992-10-01	Sherman Wong 黃靖華	Imperial 京都	
All Over the World 大昅野	1993-01-07		Regal 永高	cameo/herself
1/3 Lover; 1/3情人	1993	Tommy Wong 王振仰		Released in Japan as KEDAMONO 獣
Dream Lovers 青春夢裡人	1994			

=== Japanese V-cinema and films ===
Title	Release date	Director	Studio	Notes
Koiko no mainichi 恋子の毎日	1988-12-17	Kanji Amao	Toei	
Strawberry Times 2: Santa ga koishi niyattekita ストロベリータイムス2 サンタが恋しにやってきた	1989-11	Kazuhiro Onohara	Bandai Visual	V-Cinema
Shin dōtei monogatari: Hong Kong virgin boy 新・童貞物語 ホンコンバージンボーイ	1990-03-10	Tomioka Tadahumi	Bandai Visual	
Code Name 348: Onna keiji sashiba コードネーム348 女刑事 サシバ	1990-12-10	Kan Mukai	Shochiku Video	V-Cinema
Kyonyū Hunter 2: Adventure Summer 巨乳ハンター2 アドベンチャー・サマー	1990-12-25	Toshio Kobayashi	Tohokushinsha Film	V-Cinema
Murakami Rena: kyūkyoku meigizuma 村上麗奈 究極名器妻 レナ・フィルム	1997-08-01	Satoru Kobayashi	Runa Films; XCes	produced and starred
Serial Dad 小森生活向上クラブ; Komori seikatsu kōjō kurabu	2008-11-08	Ikki Katashima	Phantom Film (ファントム・フィルム)	

== Magazine appearances ==
- Goro
  - November 24, 1988 (#23, nude, with Reiko Hayama)
  - December 8, 1988 (#24, nude)
- Heibon Punch
  - May 5, 1988 (4 p., nude)
- Weekly Playboy
  - 1988
    - April 5, 1988 (5 p., nude)
    - July 19, 1988 (3 p., swimming suit)
    - September 20, 1988 (4p., nude)
  - 1989
    - March 21, 1989 (6 p., nude)
    - August 15, 1989 (7 p., nude)
  - 1992
    - November 24, 1992 (nude)

== Bibliography ==
=== English ===
- Rena Murakami at IMDb

=== Japanese ===
- 村上麗奈 むらかみ・れな (in Japanese). allcinema.net.
- "村上麗奈 (Profile and filmography)" (in Japanese). dmm.co.jp.
- 村上麗奈 (in Japanese). Japanese Movie Database.
- 村上麗奈( 出演 ) (in Japanese). Kinema Junpo. Archived from the original on 2012-03-24.
- "村上麗奈/むらかみれいな/Murakami Rina" (in Japanese). i-dic.dorachan.com. Archived from the original on 2014-04-07.
