= Scoutman =

- Directed by: Masato Ishioka
- Written by: Masato Ishioka
- Starring: Miku Matsumoto; Hideo Nakaizumi
- Music by: Kōji Endō
- Production company: Gold View Company Ltd
- Distributed by: Argo Pictures; Gold View Company Ltd
- Release date: 2000
- Running time: 114 min.
- Country: Japan
- Language: Japanese

Scoutman aka Pain (ＰＡＩＮ／ペイン) is a 2000 Japanese film written and directed by Masato Ishioka.

== Plot ==
Twenty-year-old Atsushi and his seventeen-year-old girlfriend Mari arrive in Tokyo from the suburbs with plans to marry despite their parent's objections but they are soon pulled into the city's dark underside. Atsushi meets Miki, a fading adult video (AV) actress, and gets introduced by the veteran Yoshiya to the occupation of "scoutman", recruiters who ply the streets trying to convince young girls to join the AV industry. Meanwhile, Mari, looking for work, runs into Kana who initiates her into the business of selling tickets to swinger's parties. The young couple continue to fall deeper into the seductions of Tokyo's sex industry and away from each other.

== Cast ==
- Miku Matsumoto as Mari
- Hideo Nakaizumi as Atsushi
- Yuka Fujimoto as Kana
- Akihito Yoshiie as Yoshiya
- Yuri Komuro as Miki
- Shirō Shimomoto as Sugishita
- Kei Morikawa as director

== Production ==
Director Masato Ishioka learned his trade working as an assistant director in the adult video (AV) industry under Tadashi Yoyogi at Athena Eizou for several years. Other veterans of the adult industry in the film include former AV star Yuri Komuro, playing the part of Miki, as well as actresses Fuka Sakurai (桜井風花) and Yuna Miyazawa (宮澤ゆうな), and AV director Kei Morikawa in small roles.

== Release ==
The film made the round of the international film festivals, appearing at the Venice Film Festival on September 6, 2000, the Toronto International Film Festival on September 14, 2000, the Hong Kong International Film Festival on April 8, 2001, and the Singapore International Film Festival on April 21, 2001. The movie made its theatrical debut in Japan as ＰＡＩＮ／ペイン on October 27, 2001, at the Nakano Musashino Hall, known for showcasing new Japanese filmmakers. A Region 2 DVD version of ＰＡＩＮ／ペイン was released in Japan on November 22, 2002 and an NTSC All Regions version (as Scout Man) was also produced.

== Reception ==
=== Critics ===
The film was generally well received by critics, Mark Schilling at the Japan Times Online gives the movie four stars and praises its realistic portrayal of Japan's sex industry while Jasper Sharp calls it "perhaps the most honest and realistic films about the sex industry from the past few years."

=== Awards ===
The film won director Ishioka the Directors Guild of Japan New Directors Award for 2001 and the Directors' Week Special Jury Award at the 2001 Fantasporto.
