= Kei Morikawa =

Japanese film director

- Occupation: Film director
- Years active: about 1989 –

Kei Morikawa (森川圭, Morikawa Kei) is a Japanese mainstream film and adult video (AV) director. Over a career of more than 20 years in adult entertainment, he directed in excess of 200 adult videos.

== Life and career ==
=== Adult video (AV) director ===
Morikawa started directing adult videos at least as early as 1989 with Shita Namazuri (舌なまずり) starring Asako Sakura for the Alice Japan studio. In addition to Alice Japan, throughout the decade of the 1990s, Morikawa also directed AVs for several other "Viderin" companies including VIP, Atlas21, h.m.p., Kuki, Media Station and Max-A. During this time, he worked with early AV Idols Rui Sakuragi, Aika Miura, Yuri Komuro and Bunko Kanazawa.

Outside the AV industry, Morikawa was credited as planner for Rokurō Mochizuki's 1991 debut mainstream film Skinless Night. Also in the 1990s, Morikawa wrote and directed three softcore erotic V-cinema works, the comedy AV joyū shigan (ＡＶ女優志願) for Daiei in September 1993, the drama Chika tenshi ga tōrisugiru kisetsu (Ｃｈｉｋａ 天使が通り過ぎる季節) in September 1998 and OL Kabushikigaisha (ＯＬ株式会社) in February 1999 (co-written with Masato Ishioka).

Morikawa continued working with Alice Japan and Atlas21 in the 2000s but he also began directing for some of the newer independent AV studios such as Moodyz, SOD and by early 2006, S1 where he became one of their leading directors. Morikawa directed videos starring a number of prominent AV actresses including Nao Oikawa, Kokoro Amano, Nana Natsume, Sora Aoi, Sasa Handa, Kaede Matsushima and Akiho Yoshizawa. In 2001, he had a small role playing an AV Director in Masato Ishioka's debut mainstream film Scoutman depicting the adult video industry that both Ishioka and Morikawa worked in.

=== Mainstream film director ===
In 2008, Morikawa served as Assistant Director on Toshiyuki Morioka's film Koneko no namida released by Kadokawa Pictures and in 2012 made his debut as a mainstream film director (and cinematographer) with 2-channel no Noroi Shin Gekijoban: Honki (2ちゃんねるの呪い 新劇場版・本危). This horror feature was a theatrical sequel to a DVD movie, 2-channel no Noroi Gekijoban, produced in 2011, and continues its theme of a cursed website. The film stars Mariya Suzuki from the Japanese girls singing group AKB48 and was released in Japan by JollyRoger on June 2, 2012.

Morikawa continued his mainstream directing career with the February 2014 horror film Exte Girl The Movie (エクステ娘 劇場版, Ekusute Musume Gekijoban), the focus of the horror being hair extensions torn from living women. The film starred another alumni of AKB48, Tomomi Nakatsuka. At the 2015 Yubari International Fantastic Film Festival, Morikawa was awarded the Grand Prize in the Off Theater Competition for his film Makeup Room, detailing the offstage drama in the makeup room at the shooting of an adult video.
