= Hitomi Shiraishi =

Japanese pornographic actress

- 白石ひとみ
- Born: December 25, 1971 (age 54); Tokyo, Japan
- Other name: Yukie Ochiai
- Height: 1.59 m (5 ft 2 1/2 in)

Hitomi Shiraishi (Japanese: 白石ひとみ, Hepburn: Shiraishi Hitomi) is a former Japanese model, adult video (AV) actress, and a movie and TV actress from the 1990s. After retiring from performing, she went on to a second career as a movie screenwriter under the name Yukie Ochiai (落合雪恵).

== Life and career ==
=== AV career ===
Hitomi Shiraishi was born on December 25, 1971. She made her debut as an AV actress at the age of eighteen in September 1990 with Virgin Ecstasy: Sensual Princess Hitomi Shiraishi released by the h.m.p. Tiffany label. Shiraishi appeared in several more videos for h.m.p. but also worked with other studios including Cosmos Plan, Shy Plan and Alice Japan. In her December 1991 video for Alice Japan, Wait Until Dark, the three scenes have her being treated as a sex slave, having a session with a vampire, and having sex with her husband. May 1992 saw her in the second installment in Kuki's series Sister-in-law's Warm Underwear engaging in a "sweet and tender forbidden love story". Also in May 1992, she starred in the inaugural video for the MAX-A Samansa label Witch-Wife Hitomi Shiraishi.

Shiraishi left the AV field for a while but after an absence of two years, she returned with the August 1995 video from Shy Plan, Heisei Goddess Legend: Resurrection. Her final retirement video Break was released by Shy Plan in November 1995. A few months later in February 1996, Shy Plan issued Legend of Hitomi Shiraishi, a compilation video covering her career with the studio.

In 2001, FantaDream released two "uncensored" videos starring Shiraishi (Uncensored videos lack the mosaic pixelation masking the genitals which is mandatory in videos released in Japan). The first video, released in September, was the initial volume in FantaDream's Super Idol series; the second from December, titled Hitomi Shiraishi Returns, was Volume 9 in the Super Idol series.

Despite her having been retired from AV work for more than 15 years, when the major Japanese adult video distributor DMM held a poll of its customers in 2012 to select the 100 all-time best AV actresses to celebrate the 30th anniversary of adult videos in Japan, Shiraishi made the list, placing at number 63. Also in 2012, the Taiwan online news service NowNews named Shiraishi as one of their Top Ten Japanese AV Idols.

=== V-Cinema and films ===
Shiraishi also appeared in a number of softcore V-Cinema productions and some mainstream films. She had a role in the April 1996 film Lady Ninja: Reflections of Darkness, a female ninja (kunoichi) costume drama, and a month later appeared in the Rashomon drama In a Thicket directed by pink film director Hisayasu Satō known as one of the "Four Heavenly Kings of Pink". V-Cinema films include Tokyo Decameron which was released in Japan in July 1996 and in an English subtitled version by Asian Pulp Cinema in November 2001, and the erotic bondage thriller The Bondage Master which was issued in Japan in April 1996 and in an English subtitled version from Asian Pulp Cinema in 2000.

=== TV appearances ===
From late 1994 to early 1998, Shiraishi had roles in several Japanese TV dramas including shows for the Osaka-based networks KTV, ABC and MBS as well as TBS and NTV in Tokyo. One of these was the January 2, 1996 TBS production Haunted Lake (呪われた湖), based on the novel Lake of Mud (湖泥), featuring the fictional detective Kosuke Kindaichi. She also appeared in Part 3 of the Fuji TV series The Way of the Osaka Loan Shark (ナニワ金融道, Naniwa Kinyūdō) broadcast January 5, 1998 and featuring Ken Ogata, Kaoru Kobayashi, Masahiro Nakai and Hikari Ishida.

=== Screenwriter ===
After her retirement from performing Shiraishi became associated with the avant-garde music studio Kaerucafe (カエルカフェ) and when the company expanded into film production, she embarked on a new career as a screenwriter under her real name Yukie Ochiai (落合雪恵). Since 2003 she has written a number of screenplays for films produced by Kaerucafe and directed by Masatoshi Akihara and has also been responsible for editing and art work in some of the productions. Her screenplay for the 2008 film The Story of Ito is a modern version of the fantasy story Ito Norisuke no Hanashi by Yakumo Koizumi (Lafcadio Hearn) while her 2009 The Setting Sun starring Eriko Sato is based on the novel of the same name by Osamu Dazai.

== Selected filmography ==
Video title	Release date	Studio	Director	Notes
=== Adult videos (AV) ===
Virgin Ecstasy: Sensual Princess Hitomi Shiraishi ヴァージン・エクスタシー 官能姫 白石ひとみ	1990-09-15	h.m.p. Tiffany; PTF-008	Yukihiko Shimamura	Debut
New Sensual Princess 新・官能姫	1991-05-12	h.m.p. Tiffany; ATF-014	Yukihiko Shimamura
Super Porno '91 Onedari Princess スーパー・ポルノ’９１ おねだり姫	1991-06-23	h.m.p. Tiffany; ATF-018	Yukihiko Shimamura
Hardcore Extract Uzuki Princess ハード・コア・エキス うずき姫	1991-07-06	h.m.p. Tiffany; ATF-019	Yukihiko Shimamura
Lucky Hole ラッキーホール	1991-08-25	Cosmos Plan; IS-52
OL Bijyū - The Office Vibration ＯＬ美獣 オフィス･バイブレーション	1991-09-14	HRC Cher; HRC-092
Hug Me Silently 黙って抱いて	1991-09-27	Alice Japan; KA-1422	Akira Ishizaki
Pink Skin ピンクスキン	1991-09-29	Cosmos Plan; IS-54
Pacifier Angel おしゃぶり天使	1991-11-10	h.m.p. Tiffany; ATF-033
Venus Bunny 4 ヴィーナスバニー４	1991-11-29	Shy Plan; FE-040	Kunihiro Hasegawa
Suki? Suki? Kiss Me, Please! 好き？好き？Kissして！	1991-12-15	Cosmos Plan; IS-60
Wait Till Dark 暗くなるまで待って	1991-12-27	Alice Japan; KA-1442	Shuji Onizawa
Perverted Secretary Likes It Raw - Part 8 H秘書はナマがお好き PART8; H Hisho wa Nama Gao Suki PART8	1992-01-07	HRC Cher; HRC-106	Kunihiro Hasegawa
Targeted Female Teacher 2 狙われた女教師 2	1992-01-24	Shy Plan; FE-044	You Camon
I Wanna Lick Your Balls & Chains Vol.7 たまにはしゃぶりつきたい７	1992-02-29	Royal Art Stella; STV-1079	Shuji Onizawa
Hitomi's Obscene Bible ひとみの淫行バイブル	1992-03-06	HRC Cher; HRC-114	Kunihiro Hasegawa
Fetish Video Magazine: Shukujokan; Fetish Video Magazine 淑女館 ６	1992-03-08	Cosmos Plan; M-34		With Mariko Kishi & Nao Suzuki
Kankin Lingerie Queen 2 監禁ランジェリークイーン２	1992	Shy Plan; FE-050
Indecent Uniform: Nugasete 制服ワイセツ ねぇ、脱がせて; Seifuku Waisetsu nee, Nugasete	1992-04-17	Athena Eizou; AS-241	Hikaru Kitoh
Sister-in-law's Warm Underwear 義姉の生下着 ２	1992-05-16 (VHS); 1997-09-26 (VCD); 1999-02-26 (DVD)	Kuki Sonia; QX-227 (VHS); VKD-015 (VCD); KDV-046 (DVD)	Jin Yuho
Witch-Wife Hitomi Shiraishi 白石ひとみの奥様は魔女	1992-05-30	MAX-A Samansa; XS-2001	Kunihiro Hasegawa
The Moment of Truth 真実の瞬間; Shinjitsu no Shunkan	1992-06-13	Shy Plan; FE-057	Kunihiro Hasegawa
Wedding Slave 2 ウエディングスレイプ2	1992-06-29	HRC Cher; HRC-124
Flash Paradise フラッシュパラダイス	1992-07-03	Alice Japan; KA-1481	Rokurō Mochizuki
Sexy Butt 女尻; Mejiri	1992-08-07	Alice Japan; KA-1489	Kunihiro Hasegawa
White Paper on Wanton Wife ひとみの若妻白書	1992-09-11	Athena Eizou; AS-262	Hikaru Kitoh
Ecstasy Feeling; E気持	1992-08-31	Royal Art/Deluxe Paris; DP-042	Mondo Suzuki
Venus Bunny Special ヴィーナスバニースペシャル	1995-03-17	Shy Plan; FE-178		Compilation with Mari Asaka, Reika, Reina Hosokawa, Shiori Fujitani & Yumika Sugimoto
Heisei Goddess Legend: Resurrection 平成女神伝説 復活	1995-08-31	Shy Plan; FE-204	Kunihiro Hasegawa
Declaration of Well-Bred Woman 平成淑女宣言	1995-09-27	Shy Plan; FE-208	Kunihiro Hasegawa
Kankin Lingerie Queen History 監禁ランジェリークィーン ヒストリー	1995-10-21	Shy Plan; FE-212	You Camon	With Yuri Saeki & Mariya Kurasawa
Targeted Female Teacher 10 狙われた女教師10	1995-10-31	Shy Plan; FE-214	Kunihiro Hasegawa
Break	1995-11-30	Shy Plan; FE-219	Kunihiro Hasegawa
Legend of Hitomi Shiraishi; LEGEND 白石ひとみ伝説	1996-02-19	Shy Plan; FE-234	Kunihiro Hasegawa	Compilation of scenes from her earlier work for Shy Plan
Pero Pero Pink 2 ペロペロピンク2	1997-06-20	Alice Japan; DV-002		Compilation DVD with Miho Aimoto
Super Idol Vol. 1: Hitomi Shiraishi	2001-09-20	FantaDream; FDD-1201		Uncensored
Super Idol Vol. 9: Hitomi Shiraishi Returns	2001-12-15	FantaDream; FDD-1209		Uncensored
Cosmos Classic Hitomi Shiraishi 宇宙企画Classic 白石ひとみ	2002-09-13	Cosmos Plan; MDM-021		Compilation DVD containing Lucky Hole and Pink Skin
Legend Resurrected: Legend Special Vol. 5 蘇る伝説のアクトレスたち Ｌｅｇｅｎｄ Ｓｐｅｃｉａｌ ５ 白石ひとみ	2008-12-19	Graffiti; GRAS-005		Compilation DVD containing Venus Bunny 4, Targeted Female Teacher 2, The Moment of Truth and Heisei Goddess Legend: Resurrection
Legend Resurrected: Legend Special Vol. 10 蘇る伝説のアクトレスたち Ｌｅｇｅｎｄ Ｓｐｅｃｉａｌ ｖｏｌ．１０ 白石ひとみ	2009-02-27	Graffiti; GRAS-010		Compilation DVD containing Declaration of Well-Bred Woman, Targeted Female Teacher 10, Break and Legend of Hitomi Shiraishi

Video title	Release date	Studio	Director	Notes
=== V-Cinema ===
ゆけゆけＡＶ新撰組 天使たちのＨな大戦争; Yuke yuke AV shinsengumi: Tenshi tachi no H na daisensō	1992-08-25	Stella	Eitaro Onuma	With Mirei Asaoka & Ai Iijima
The Bondage Master / Rope Detective 縄師事件簿	1996-04-26	Tōhokushinsha	Hitoshi Hoshino	With Yukijirō Hotaru & Yokiru Ikuta
Tokyo Decameron 東京デカメロン; Tōkyõ Dekameron	1996-07-21	Sentesutajio (センテスタジオ)	Koichi Kobayashi	With Kei Mizutani, Marie Jinno & Hitoe Ootake
Cyber Inner Palace 電脳大奥; Dennou Ohoko	1997-11-21	Shintōhō Eiga; CSV-004	Naoyuki Tomomatsu	With Hitomi Shimizu & Mio Nishino

Video title	Release date	Studio	Director	Notes
=== Theatrical films ===
Mari's Prey マリーの獲物; Marii no Emono	1996-01-27	Faniienjeru (ファニーエンジェル)	Keiichirō Yoshida	With Makiko Kuno and Takeshi Yamato
Lady Ninja: Reflections of Darkness くノ一忍法帖 忍者月影抄; Kunoichi ninpō chō: Ninja tsukikage shō	1996-04-13	King Records	Masaru Tsushima	With Yuka Ōnishi, Tetsuo Kurata, Rina Kitahara, Miho Nomoto and Asami Jō
In a Thicket 薮の中; Yabu no Naka	1996-05-18	Image Factory	Hisayasu Satō	With Shigeki Hosokawa, Kō Takasugi and Kaori Sakagami
Dangan Runner / Non-Stop 弾丸ランナー; Dangan ranna	1996-11-09	Nikkatsu	Hiroyuki Tanaka	With Tomorowo Taguchi, Diamond Yukai and Shin'ichi Tsutsumi

Video title	Release date	Studio	Director
=== Screenwriter ===
Umi no Yume, Tokai no Kyo 海の夢、都会の虚	2004-03-13	Kaerucafe (カエルカフェ)	Masatoshi Akihara
Typhoon Passed 台風一過	2004-05-08	Kaerucafe	Masatoshi Akihara
Fucha: The Other Side of the Melody フーチャ～旋律の彼方へ～	2004-07-31	Kaerucafe	Masatoshi Akihara
Dolphin Swim ドルフィンスイム	2004-09-04	Kaerucafe	Masatoshi Akihara
Break Out ブレイクアウト!	2005-01-22	Kaerucafe	Masatoshi Akihara
Marimba Ensemble マリンバ・アンサンブル	2005-06-25	Kaerucafe	Masatoshi Akihara
Flowers at Noon 真昼の花; Marihu no hana	2005-10-08	Kaerucafe	Masatoshi Akihara
MAMAN ママーン	2006-01-26	Kaerucafe	Masatoshi Akihara
Where Is Her Place To Stay 春の居場所; Haru no ibasho	2006-02-11	Kaerucafe	Masatoshi Akihara
Various Scenes of Mt Fuji 富嶽百景 ～遥かなる場所～	2006-06-03	Kaerucafe	Masatoshi Akihara
I Carry the Ticket of Eternity 銀河鉄道の夜; Ginga tetsudō no yoru	2006-11-04	Kaerucafe	Masatoshi Akihara
Five-storied Pagoda 五重塔; Gojūnotō	2007-03-30	Kaerucafe	Masatoshi Akihara
White Camellia 白椿; Shirotsubaki	2007-10-06	Kaerucafe	Masatoshi Akihara
The Story of Ito 伊藤の話; Ito no Hanashi	2008-04-26	Kaerucafe	Masatoshi Akihara
Ni jū shinzō 二重心臓	2008-10-04	Kaerucafe	Masatoshi Akihara
The Setting Sun 斜陽; Shayō	2009-06-13	Kaerucafe	Masatoshi Akihara

== Photobooks ==
- Eyes (アイズ) - Eichi Publishing (April 1992) (ISBN 4754213262)
- Love for Sale – TIS (July 1992) (ISBN 4847022777)

== Sources ==
=== As Hitomi Shiraishi ===
- "Hitomi Shiraishi at IMDb". IMDb.
- "Profile & Filmography at AV Idol Directory".
- "Profile & Filmography at Urabon Navigator".
- "Hitomi Shiraishi at JMDB" (in Japanese).
- "Hitomi Shiraishi at All Cinema" (in Japanese).
- "Profile & Filmography at h.m.p." (in Japanese).
- "Profile & Filmography at Alice Japan" (in Japanese).
- "Profile & Filmography at DMM" (in Japanese).

=== As Yukie Ochiai ===
- "Yukie Ochiai at IMDb". IMDb.
- "Yukie Ochiai at All Cinema" (in Japanese).
- "Yukie Ochiai at MovieWalker" (in Japanese). Archived from the original on 2012-02-25.
- "Yukie Ochiai at JMDB" (in Japanese).
