= Gilgamesh Night =

Japanese television series

Gilgamesh Night (ギルガメッシュないと / ギルガメッシュ・ナイト) was a Japanese softcore porn variety TV show broadcast from October 1991 to March 1998. Airing early Sunday mornings at 1:15 a.m. JST on TV Tokyo, the hour-long show helped launch the career of one of its late hosts, Ai Iijima, who afterwards moved into a more mainstream career.

== Description ==
Gilgamesh was a long-running example of the late-night sexy programming popular on Japanese television.

The show was in the format of a variety show. Segments included "Yashoku Banzai", a cooking corner with Yuuki Hitomi wearing just an apron; shiatsu with Jeff Furukawa; "Bathtub Cinema", in which a nude young woman in a bathtub reviewed a current film; and "No-Panty Pub Report", in which the television crew would visit a Tokyo bar featuring waitresses without undergarments.

== Cast ==
- Reiko Hayama
- Yuki Hitomi
- Fumie Hosokawa
- Shinobu Hosokawa
- Ai Iijima
- Kyosei Iwamoto (co-host)
- Asami Jō
- Anna Kazuki
- Rina Kitahara
- Akira Kiuchi
- Sena Matsuda
- Kei Mizutani
- Shoot Ogawa (1997)
- Kaori Ōhara
- Ijiri Okada
- Ayumi Sakurai
- Tamao Sato
- Masaya Yamazaki
- Nami Yasumuro
