= Hōzuki-san Chi no Aneki =

Manga series by Ran Igarashi

- Cover of the first volume

鬼灯さん家のアネキ
- Genre: Romantic comedy
- Manga
- Written by: Ran Igarashi
- Published by: Kadokawa Shoten
- Magazine: Young Ace
- Original run: December 4, 2009 – 2011
- Volumes: 4
- Manga

Hōzuki-san Chi no Aneki (+Imouto)
- Written by: Ran Igarashi
- Published by: Kadokawa Shoten
- Magazine: Young Ace
- Original run: April 4, 2014 – present
- Live-action film
- Directed by: Rikya Imaizumi
- Written by: Rikya Imaizumi; Shō Kataoka
- Music by: Junichi Soga
- Released: September 6, 2014

Hōzuki-san Chi no Aneki (Japanese: 鬼灯さん家のアネキ; "The Older Sister of Hōzuki's Household") is a yonkoma manga series written and illustrated by Ran Igarashi. A live action film adaptation was released on September 6, 2014.

== Characters ==
- Gorō Hōzuki (Tomoya Maeno)
- Haru Hōzuki (Momoko Tani)
- Ai Mizuno (Kayo Satoh)

=== Film cast ===
- Tomoya Maeno
- Momoko Tani
- Kayo Satō
- Yukie Kawamura
- Hitomi Yoshizaki
- Amane Okayama
- Reiko Hayama
- Shingo Mizusawa
- Fuyuki Moto

== Media ==
=== Manga ===
Written and illustrated by Ran Igarashi, Hōzuki-san Chi no Aneki was initially published as a one-shot in Kadokawa Shoten's Young Ace magazine. It later began serialization in the same magazine on December 4, 2009.
