= Kunihiro Hasegawa =

Japanese adult video director

- Born: Japan
- Occupation: Film director
- Years active: about 1987–

Kunihiro Hasegawa (長谷川九仁広) is a Japanese adult video (AV) director. He has directed more than 200 videos during his long career.

== Life and career ==
Hasegawa began directing adult videos at least as early as June 1987 with Taboo Forbidden Fruit Keiko Nakazawa (タブー禁芯 中沢慶子), starring actress Keiko Nakazawa, for V&R Planning, a studio which had been founded just the year before by Kaoru Adachi. In 1989, Hasegawa was still making videos for V&R Planning but was also working for another early AV studio VIP. By March 1991, Hasegawa was directing for Alice Japan with the video Rape Crazy (レイプ狂い, Reipu Kurui). Hasegawa would spend much of his AV career with Alice Japan, directing more than 100 videos for the studio.

When the new AV studio Max-A started up in May 1992, Hasegawa directed the first video on their Samansa label, Witch-Wife (白石ひとみの奥様は魔女), starring AV Idol Hitomi Shiraishi. Throughout the 1990s, Hasegawa continued to direct for Alice Japan, VIP and Max-A as well as Shy Plan, Media Station, and VIP's successor Atlas21.

Hasegawa had begun directing softcore V-Cinema works as early as September 1996 with Neo-Amazon Jungle Lolita (ネオアマゾネス 密林のロリータ, Neoamazonesu Mitsurin no Rorīta) for TMC but he completed more than 20 V-Cinema productions in the 2005-2006 period. Also in 2006, Hasegawa directed the historical costume drama set in the Edo period, The Inner Palace: Indecent War, released by Max-A under the DoraMax label in July 2006. In addition to the hardcore video the movie was also released in a shorter softcore R-15 rated version. A sequel The Inner Palace: Flower of War (also directed by Hasegawa) was once again released in both hardcore and softcore versions. The two videos were released in a combined four-hour digitally remastered edition in May 2009.

During his long career in the adult video industry, Hasegawa worked with many actresses including early AV Idols Keiko Nakazawa, Hitomi Shiraishi and Rui Sakuragi, as well as later stars Sora Aoi, Yuma Asami, Bunko Kanazawa, Nao Oikawa, Riko Tachibana, Rio, Maria Yumeno and others.

Aside from reissues of earlier AV works, all his recent activity seems to be in the V-Cinema sphere.
