= Sakuragi =

Sakuragi (written: 桜木 or 桜樹 lit. "cherry blossom tree") is a Japanese surname. Notable people with the surname include:

- Chisako Sakuragi, a writer and illustrator of manga
- J. R. Sakuragi, born as J. R. Henderson, an American-Japanese professional basketball player
- Rui Sakuragi, a Japanese actress in adult videos ('AV idol')
- Shino Sakuragi (桜木 紫乃; born 1965), Japanese writer
- Yuji Sakuragi, a Japanese sportsman engaged in several fighting sports (mixed martial arts, wrestling, kick-boxing)
- Yukiya Sakuragi, a writer and illustrator of manga

Fictional characters:

- Hanamichi Sakuragi, the main character in the sports-themed manga series Slam Dunk
- Matsuri Sakuragi, a character in the manga and comedy series Ichigo Mashimago
- Naohito Sakuragi, a character in the manga and anime series Fruits Basket
- Rokurouta Sakuragi, an important character in the manga series Rainbow: Nisha Rokubō no Shichinin
- Tatsuya Sakuragi, a character in Shiritsu Bakaleya Koukou, a live action TV series
- Yaeka, Katsuhiko, and Miyuki Sakuragi, characters in the manga and anime series The Yakuza’s Guide to Babysitting

== See also ==
- Sakuragi Station (Chiba)
- Sakuragi Station (Shizuoka)
- Sakuragichō Station
