= Yuri Komuro =

Japanese adult video actress (born 1976)

- 小室友里
- Born: July 28, 1976 (age 49); Kanagawa Prefecture, Japan
- Height: 1.57 m (5 ft 2 in)

Yuri Komuro (Japanese: 小室友里, Hepburn: Komuro Yuri) (born July 28, 1976 in Kanagawa Prefecture, Japan) is a Japanese actress, author and former AV idol. She was one of the top actresses in the AV field during the late 1990s and in her dominant period from 1996 to 1999 was called "The AV Queen".

== Life and career ==
=== Early life and AV career ===
Yuri Komuro, who was born in Japan's Kanagawa Prefecture on July 28, 1976, commented in a news article, "I've always had a strong sexual awareness, even as a kid." While still in kindergarten she asked a neighborhood boy to play with her breasts. Komuro recalls once, still at an early age, inviting a university student to give her a blow job before she knew what the term meant. She comments that the resultant experience with cunnilingus would today be considered a sex crime.

Komuro began studying for a career as a travel agent before she began work in the adult entertainment field. Her decision to work in the AV industry was based on a desire to do something more unusual. "I thought if I did this," she comments, "I could change my life, Otherwise, I figured my future would be pretty predictable." Komuro made her AV debut at age nineteen with h.m.p. on their Tiffany label in January 1996. Komuro continued working for h.m.p. for her first two years in the AV industry.

In January 1998 Komuro appeared in the Alice Japan video Sexy Butt directed by Tohjiro and starred in a number of other Alice Japan series over the next two years. In May 1998, Komuro was featured in the pseudo-documentary style adult video Legend Of An AV Idol directed by Kei Morikawa for Atlas21.

Komuro took advantage of her popularity as an AV idol to engage in a business venture, endorsing a perfume which, it was claimed, was based on the smell of a pair of panties she had worn for several days without changing. The perfume was called "Asoko," literally meaning, "That place," a Japanese euphemism for the genitals.

As a reigning AV star in the 1990s, Komuro could depend on a guarantee of one million yen (about US$10,000) or more per video. In spite of her high earnings, however, after retiring from the AV field, Komuro realized that she had not been very wise with her money. "I blew my money in all kinds of spectacular ways, What was left, I used to buy a car and personal computer. If I had saved the income from just three films, things wouldn't be so tight now. Life is hard for AV actresses once they retire."

=== Post-AV career ===
After announcing her AV retirement plans in 1999 with Last Scene, Komuro commented, "When I look back at my acting days, it was lots of fun. Just by following somebody's instructions to disrobe I could make millions, or even tens of millions of yen. I think back on the opportunity with a sense of gratitude."

Komuro's AV industry past was reflected in her role in director Masato Ishioka's debut feature film, Scoutman (ペイン, Pain), where she played the role of Miki, a former tantai (star-quality) AV actress whose adult video career is kept a secret from her husband. Kei Morikawa, Komuro's AV director from her Atlas21 days, has a role as an AV director. The film was presented at several international film festivals, including the Venice Film Festival and the Toronto International Film Festival. It was nominated for Best Asian Feature Film at the Singapore International Film Festival, and won Ishioka the Directors' Week Special Jury Award at the Fantasporto competition. It was released theatrically in Japan on October 27, 2001.

In April 2002, Komuro co-starred with Kyoko Aizome in the Shintōhō Eiga pink film Molester In a Hospital which was also directed by Aizome. The film, mixing mystery and eroticism, involves a hospital where several patients and staff have been raped on the night shift. The hospital's head (Kyoko Aizome) wants to avoid damaging the hospital's reputation and brings in an undercover investigator (Yuri Komuro) under the guise of a patient counselor. The movie was also released as a video on the Alice Japan Babylon label (KR-9172) in October 2002.

Though she concedes, "Most of what I do has some sort of connection with eroticism," writing had always been one of Komuro's interests. During her AV career she had written a series of essays expressing her thoughts on topics such as friends, family, work, love, the AV industry, and sex. In December 1998 a collection of these essays were published under the title Bare Faced (素顔). When fellow AV idol Runa Hoshizaki gave Komuro an introduction, she began pursuing writing as a career. Komuro wrote sex-advice articles, conducted interviews with sex industry workers, and wrote pieces which were serialized in journals.

In 2006, it was reported that Komuro had moved on to a second career in journalism, covering the field of erotic entertainment. In spite of her lifelong involvement with erotic entertainment, looking back on her AV career, Komuro says, "I never had an orgasm during a film shooting. Except when somebody worked on me with a vibrator." In 2006, seven years after retirement from the AV industry, Komuro stated, "I'm finally at the stage where I can really enjoy sex."

== Bibliography ==
- "小室友里の部屋へようこそ (Video Idol Interview)" (in Japanese). b-v.co.jp. September 1996. Archived from the original on 2002-06-04.
- Samson, Antonio R. (2006-01-17). "Fence Sitter". BusinessWorld. Manila.
- "小室友里 (Komuro Yuri)" (in Japanese). 'Web I-dic' (Idol Dictionary). 1998-04-05. Archived from the original on 2015-01-24.
- Yuri Komuro at IMDb
- "Yuri Komuro". Urabon Navigator.
