= Mari Ayukawa =

Japanese pornographic actress

- 鮎川真理
- Born: 2 December 1969 (age 56); Tokyo, Japan
- Height: 1.53 m (5 ft 0 in)

Mari Ayukawa (Japanese: 鮎川真理, Hepburn: Ayukawa Mari; Chinese: 鯰川真理, Cantonese Yale: Nim4 Chyun1 Jan1 Lei5) is a former Japanese AV idol and pink film actress.

== Life and career ==
Mari Ayukawa was born in Tokyo on December 2, 1969. Ayukawa had nurse education in high school and she was a medical school student when she made her AV debut in the July 1988 Arena release, Nani o Utsuse! (ナニを写せ！).

Ayukawa starred in the female pink film director Sachi Hamano's entry in Shintōhō Eiga's Molester's Train series, Molester's Train: Hurry Up and Come! (痴漢電車早くイッてよ！, Chikan Densha: Hayaku Itteyo!). In 1989 she starred in two films for pink film pioneer Satoru Kobayashi, Monzetsuhigi: Bishonure (悶絶秘戯 びしょ濡れ) and Hakui no Tenshi: Musaboru Futomomo (白衣の天使 むさぼる太腿), both of which were distributed by Xces. Ayukawa also starred in director Akio Jissoji's The Waltz (ラ・ヴァルス, Ra varusu) (1990), also distributed by Xces.

In 1991, Ayukawa played the role of the wife of Kuen the silk-maker in the Hong Kong Category III classic Sex and Zen.

In 2006, Ayukawa's AV career, which ran from 1988 to 1990, much of it for the h.m.p. and Alice Japan studios, was reviewed in the DVD Mari Ayukawa History, released by Atlas21.

== Partial filmography ==
Title	Release date	Director	Studio	Notes
Sex and Zen 玉蒲團之偷情寶鑑	1991	Michael Mak	Golden Harvest	

== Bibliography ==
- "Profile: Mari Ayukawa 鮎川真理". Urabon Navigator 1997-2006.
- 鮎川真理 あゆかわ・まり (in Japanese). allcinema.net.
- 鮎川 真理 (in Japanese). 'Web I-dic' (Idol Dictionary). 2006-07-02.
- 鮎川真理 (in Japanese). Japanese Movie Database.
- Filmography at HKMDB
- 鮎川真理 (出演) (in Japanese). Kinema Junpo. Archived from the original on 2012-03-24.
- AV filmography at Eropedia.jp
- 鮎川真理 (in Japanese). www.arzon.jp/.
- "File 012: 鮎川真理 Ayukawa Mari". Shintoho homepage. Archived from the original on April 6, 2010.
- "鮎川真理". Videoboy TV. Archived from the original on 2008-12-24.
