= Atlas21 =

Japanese adult video production company

- Industry: Pornography
- Predecessor: VIP
- Founded: 1981
- Headquarters: Tokyo, Japan
- Products: Pornographic films
- Website: http://www.atlas21.co.jp http://www.vip-enterprise.com

Atlas21 (アトラスにじゅういち, Atorasu Nijūichi), formerly known as VIP, is a Japanese adult video company with headquarters in Tokyo, Japan.

== Company information ==
=== VIP ===
The AV company VIP Enterprise (VIPエンタープライズ, VIP Entāpuraizu) was founded in June 1981 and issued its first video, titled Women's Toilet Series (女子便所シリーズ, Joshi Benjo Shiriizu), in December of that same year making it one of the first adult video companies to be established in Japan. The studio continued production in 1982 with works that included S&M and scatological themes. In 1983, the company changed its name from VIP Enterprise to VIP Incorporated (株式会社ビップ, Kabushiki gaisha Bippu). By 1985, the studio was using actresses with some background in entertainment, such as Anri Inoue (井上あんり) who made her AV debut with VIP in August 1985 with the video Venus With Teardrops (ヴィーナスの滴り, Viinasu no Shititari).

The major event in the company's history in the 1980s was the debut of Hitomi Kobayashi in 1986 in her video Forbidden Relationship. With her style and looks, Kobayashi was a major factor in bringing in the concept of the AV Idol to the fledgling Japanese adult video industry, and, as the "AV Queen", she brought outstanding sales to VIP. In February 1987, Nao Saejima debuted with the company. Another early star for VIP was Rui Sakuragi, who made her debut in April 1989 under the name Masako Ichinose but took the name Rui Sakuragi the following year.

=== Stella / Atlas21 ===
In January 1990, a new AV company, Stella (ステラ, Sutera), was formed as a subsidiary to VIP and, four years later in May 1994, the company's name was changed from Stella to Atlas21. By July of that year, the company had undergone a major reorganization, and the VIP company name and label were dropped in favor of the Atlas21 name and Atlas label. Two new labels, "OZ" and "SAURS", were also introduced as part of the newly named Atlas21 studio.

Sometime before 1997, Atlas21 joined with the Kuki group of companies, which, in addition to Kuki, comprised Alice Japan, Max-A, Media Station (Cosmos Plan), Big Morkal and Sexia. They were, at one time, the largest family of AV companies in Japan. Along with the other companies in the Kuki group, Atlas21 belonged to the voluntary ethics organization called (in English) the Nihon Ethics of Video Association (NEVA) or (in Japanese) 日本ビデオ倫理協会 (Nippon Bideo Rinri Kyoukai or Japan Video Morality Association), usually abbreviated as ビデ倫 (Biderin or Viderin). Prominent AV actresses who appeared in Atlas21 videos in the late 1990s included Asami Jō, Jun Kusanagi, Yuri Komuro, Madoka Ozawa and Bunko Kanazawa.

=== Recent history ===
In August 1998, the company revived the VIP name as a separate subsidiary company, Video Information Products Inc. (株式会社ビジュアルインフォメーションプロダクツ, Kabushiki gaisha Bijuaruinfomēshonpurodakutsu). In addition to earlier Atlas21 AV stars Ai Kurosawa and Bunko Kanazawa, the new VIP also featured such actresses as Akira Watase, Nao Oikawa, Naho Ozawa and Riko Tachibana.

In 2005, the Atlas21 company reported capital of 13 million yen (about $130,000USD), and it had 11 employees. Both Atlas21 and VIP ceased production of new adult video products in December 2006. From its official website, the company gives access to another site which offers downloads of many of the early classic videos produced by the company, including works by Hitomi Kobayashi, Rui Sakuragi and Ai Iijima. The VIP label is now used by Media Bank (メディアバンク, Media Banku), another AV production company, which has been issuing videos under this label since at least 2001.

== Labels ==
Atlas21

In addition to the Atlas label, the studio also used:

- Gaia
- Oz
- Saurs

VIP

In addition to the VIP label, the following were also used:

- Chao
- God
- Ribon

== Directors ==
Noted directors who have worked for VIP or Atlas21:

- Kunihiro Hasegawa
- Katsuyuki Hirano
- Masato Ishioka
- Kei Morikawa
- Yukihiko Shimamura
- Akira Takatsuki

== Actresses ==
A selected list of some of the actresses who have appeared in videos for VIP and Atlas21:

- Hotaru Akane
- Minori Aoi
- Ami Ayukawa
- Mari Ayukawa
- Ai Iijima
- Asami Jō
- Bunko Kanazawa
- Sakurako Kaoru
- Mariko Kawana
- Hitomi Kobayashi
- Yuri Komuro
- Aika Miura
- Ran Monbu
- Nozomi Momoi
- Kyoko Nakajima
- Nao Oikawa
- Nao Saejima
- Rui Sakuragi
- Riko Tachibana
- Akira Watase
- Maria Yumeno

== Series ==
Some popular series produced by Atlas21 and VIP:

Atlas21

- Cos-Para
- Home Delivery Soapland 宅配ソープでございます
- The Call Girl ザ・コールガール
- The Neo Uniform Connection NEO出血大制服
- The Uniform Connection 出血大制服
- Violent Lips 激唇

VIP

- Crime and Punishment 罪と罰
- The Uniform Connection 出血大制服

== Sources ==
- "Atlas21 Official Website" (in Japanese).
- "DMM List of Atlas21 DVDs" (in Japanese).
