= Kyōko Aizome =

Japanese erotic actress (born 1958)

- 愛染 恭子
- Born: 9 February 1958 (age 68); Noda, Chiba, Japan
- Website: AizomeNet

Kyōko Aizome () (Japanese: 愛染 恭子, Hepburn: Aizome Kyōko; born February 9, 1958) is a Japanese porn actress, singer, writer, and AV and film director. She has been called "the first hard-core porn actress in Japan".

== Life and career ==
=== Early life ===
Kyōko Aizome was born in Noda, Chiba Prefecture. She grew up in a troubled household, her father was a police officer who beat his wife, and her parents divorced about 1974, when Aizome was 16 years old. Soon after graduation from high school, Aizome was scouted in Tokyo's Shinjuku neighborhood by a photographer for nude magazines. She saw nude modeling as a stepping-stone into a career in entertainment.

=== Daydream ===
Pioneer pink film director Tetsuji Takechi noticed Aizome in one of her nude photo magazine appearances. Pinku eiga, or "pink films", are the softcore genre of sex-film which dominated Japan's domestic cinema during the 1960s and 1970s. Tetsuji had made Daydream (1964), the first big-budget pink film. He chose Aizome to star in his hardcore remake of this film, also called Daydream (1981), giving the actress her leading-role debut. Japan's first theatrically released film featuring hardcore sex, Aizome added to the controversy surrounding the film by admitting to having performed actual sexual intercourse on camera. Though, as Japanese law required, sexual organs and pubic hair were fogged on screen, the Asahi Shimbun calls it Japan's first hardcore pornographic movie. By 1981, hardcore adult videos (AVs) were already starting to win over the adult entertainment audience in Japan, but the film became a hit with theatrical audiences. Uncensored copies of the film were also circulated illegally.

=== After Daydream ===
After Daydream, Aizome became active in Japan's prolific adult video and pink film industries. She made her debut in the still-young AV industry in November 1981 with April of Lust for director Tadashi Yoyogi, making her one of Japan's earliest AV idols. Her name became a marketing tool and was used in the titles of such later theatrical releases as Yoyogi's Kyōko Aizome's Somber Reminiscence (Aizome Kyōko Kareinaru Tsuioku) (1983) and Shin'ya Yamamoto's Kyōko Aizome's Widow's Boarding House (Aizome Kyōko no Mibōjin Geshuku) (1984).

Aizome's fame also led her to embark on a successful live-performance career in striptease, which lasted until her retirement in July 1994. While engaged in stripping, she was arrested twice in 1983 for indecent exposure. She used her jail time to review her career and rededicate herself to a life in adult entertainment. She also resolved to build a two-story, six-bedroom house in Chiba Prefecture, which she gave to her mother.

About 1986, in one of her more remarkable performances, Aizome had her hymen surgically restored so that it could be broken during the film. Previously a common procedure, hymen restorations went out of favor in Japan about the time of Aizome's use of it. The doctor who performed the restoration reports that the last time he did this surgery was on a couple in their 50s who, after seeing Aizome's film, wished to undergo the operation for their second honeymoon. In an article on the procedure, Aizome told Shukan Bunshun, "They strung a thread almost like a piano wire through the entrance to my vagina and pulled it like a drawstring to recreate the hymen. They give your privates a local anesthetic, so the operation itself doesn't really hurt. I really felt like a virgin again."

Aizome gained an international audience in the 1986 Traci Lords film, Traci Takes Tokyo. With her name mis-credited as "Kyōko Izoma", the porn-video was shot in Tokyo before Lords' scandal, and is therefore now illegal in the U.S.

Takechi Tetsuji filmed Daydream for the third time in 1987, as Daydream 2 (Hakujitsumu Zoku), and again hired Aizome for the lead role. According to the Weissers, each filming of Daydream had become progressively more exploitive, with the last, imported to the United States under the title Captured For Sex having the lowest production values and focusing most on sex and a torture orgy.

=== Later career ===
She retired from regular performances in pornography in 1994, but continued to act in erotic films occasionally in later years. She would also work behind the camera in the industry in various capacities including writing and directing. In 2001 Aizome was writing a sex- and health-advice column for women in Japan, titled "Auntie Agony".

She teamed up with "AV Queen" Hitomi Kobayashi in the February 2001 theatrical release, Kyōko Aizome vs. Hitomi Kobayashi: Sexual Excitement Competition (愛染恭子ＶＳ小林ひとみ 発情くらべ). Aizome both starred in and directed the film, which was released by Nikkatsu's post-Roman porn distributor of theatrical pornography, Excess films. An adult video starring the two actresses and also directed by Aizome followed in March. Entitled Lesbian Wives, the video had Aizome and Kobayashi playing the wives of two yakuza bosses who become engaged in a lesbian relationship. Two years later, she directed the AV Lesbian Politicians (2003), in which she also co-starred with the popular award-winning AV actress Ai Kurosawa. In late 2003, she directed and co-starred with another "mature" AV actress, Eri Kikuchi, in the softcore film Double G-Spot: Kyôko Aizome vs. Eri Kikuchi.

In October 2005, she starred in the Madonna hardcore AV Widow's Obscene Desire (愛欲の未亡人), which won her a Madonna Best Actress Award at the 2005 Moodyz Awards. She also appeared in a further video for Madonna, Mother and Son Incest (近親相姦 母と息子) with Yume Imano in May 2006 when Aizome was 48 years old.

Aizome's name was in the news again in 2007 when she was arrested for beating her niece. Aizome admitted to the allegations and was fined 500,000 yen. She explained, "I hit my niece to punish her for dating my boyfriend. But it went too far."

Co-directing with Shinji Imaoka, Aizome filmed a fourth version of Tanizaki and Takechi's Daydream, which was released on September 5, 2009. In March 2010, she played the female lead as Kikue, a masochistic elderly woman in The Slave Ship, an adaptation of Oniroku Dan novella Dorei-bune (奴隷船). Six months later she starred in her retirement adult video Retirement, the Last Production for Moodyz at age 52.

== Selected filmography ==
Film title	Release date	Studio	Director	Notes
=== Theatrical films ===
Daydream 白日夢; Hakujitsumu	1981-09-12		Tetsuji Takechi	Debut role With Kei Satō & Takemi Katsushika
華麗なる愛の遍歴 愛染恭子; Karei Naru ai no Henreki Aizome Kyōko	1982-08-14	Joy Pack	Tadashi Yoyogi	With Masayoshi Nogami
Kyōko Aizome's Somber Reminiscence 愛染恭子 華麗なる追憶; Aizome Kyōko Kareinaru Tsuioku	1983-03-11	Joy Pack	Tadashi Yoyogi	With Masayoshi Nogami & Matsu Takada
Kyōko Aizome's Widow's Boarding House 愛染恭子の未亡人下宿; Aizome Kyōko no Mibōjin Geshuku	1984-12-22	Nikkatsu	Shin'ya Yamamoto (director)	With Kate Asabuki
Daydream 2 白日夢２; Hakujitsumu Zoku	1987-02-07		Tetsuji Takechi	With Kei Satō & Kenji Hayami
Early Afternoon Love Affair 昼下りの情事; Hirusagari no Jōji	1993-12-23	Excess	Yukio Kitazawa	With Manami Ogawa
Kyōko Aizome vs. Hitomi Kobayashi: Sexual Excitement Competition 愛染恭子ＶＳ小林ひとみ 発情くらべ; Aizome Kyōko VS Kobayashi Hitomi Hatsujō Kurabe	2001-02-02	Excess	Kyōko Aizome	With Hitomi Kobayashi
Double G-Spot: Kyôko Aizome vs. Eri Kikuchi 愛染恭子ＶＳ菊池えり ダブルＧスポット; Aizome Kyōko vs Kikuchi Eri: Daburu G Supotto	2003-12-26	Shintōhō Eiga	Kyōko Aizome	With Eri Kikuchi & Kyōko Kazama; Also released as a DVD by Japan Home Video
The Slave Ship 奴隷船; Dorei-sen	2010–03-10	Shintōhō Eiga	Satoshi Kaneda	With Tarō Suwa

Video title	Release date	Studio	Director	Notes
=== Adult videos (AV) ===
April of Lust 淫欲のうずき; Inyoku no Uzuki	1981-11	Japan Video (日本ビデオ映像)	Tadashi Yoyogi	Debut AV
Dizziness Kyoko Aizome 愛染恭子のめまい	1982-01-01	Athena Eizou	Tadashi Yoyogi
Secret Sexual Technique Part 1: Soaking Wet 性感極秘テクニック １ 「ぐしょぐしょなの…」	1983	Athena Eizou / Mimizuku Video Pack; MV-9063	Tadashi Yoyogi
Secret Sexual Technique Special 性感極秘テクニックスペシャル	1984	Athena Eizou; AV-T905	Tadashi Yoyogi
Psycho Hypnotic Ecstasy Part 1 サイコ催眠エクスタシー PART-1 驚異のマインド・オーガズム	1985	Athena Eizou; AS-603	Tadashi Yoyogi
Traci Takes Tokyo	1986		Steven Cartier; Tadashi Yoyogi	With Traci Lords & Don Fernando
Three Mature Sisters Chapter 1 熟女三姉妹 第一章	1999-07-15	V&R Planning Ume; SER-022	Eitaro Haga	With Junko Misaki, Yuka Takemura & Midori Ōtsuka
Three Mature Sisters Chapter 2 熟女三姉妹 第二章	1999-07-15	V&R Planning Ume; SER-023	Eitaro Haga	With Junko Misaki, Yuka Takemura & Midori Ōtsuka
Three Mature Sisters Chapter 3 熟女三姉妹 第三章	1999-07-15	V&R Planning Ume; SER-024	Eitaro Haga	With Junko Misaki, Yuka Takemura & Midori Ōtsuka
Three Mature Sisters Chapter 4 熟女三姉妹 第四章	1999-07-15	V&R Planning Ume; SER-025	Eitaro Haga	With Junko Misaki, Yuka Takemura & Midori Ōtsuka
Three Mature Sisters Chapter 5 熟女三姉妹 第五章	1999-07-15	V&R Planning Ume; SER-026	Eitaro Haga	With Junko Misaki, Yuka Takemura & Midori Ōtsuka
Lesbian Wives 極妻レズ	2001-03-16	Alice Japan Babylon; KR-9144	Kyōko Aizome	With Hitomi Kobayashi
Mellow Sales Lady 熟女セールスレディ	2001-04-21	Shy Plan Bold; BL-068	Satoru Kobayashi
Molester In A Hospital 痴漢病棟	2002-10-25	Alice Japan Babylon; KR-9172	Kyōko Aizome	With Yuri Komuro & Mayumi Sawaki
G Pleasure; Gの快感	2002-12-24	Alice Japan Erotica; KS-8562	Kyōko Aizome
Crimson Sisters 紅姉妹	2003-01-24	CineMagic Collect; DD-052	Oniroku Dan	With Minako Ogawa & Mayumi Sawaki
Princess Hunting 姫狩り	2003-02-25	Alice Japan Babylon; KR-9178	Kenichi Fujiwara	With Kyōko Kazama & Moe Nishimura
Kyoko Aizome Special 愛染恭子スペシャル	2003-04-18	Alice Japan; DV-235 (DVD)		Compilation DVD
Lesbian Politicians 政界レズビアン 女戒	2003-09-19	Alice Japan Babylon; KR-9191 (VHS); DV-277 (DVD)	Kyōko Aizome	With Ai Kurosawa, Hitomi Shimizu & Mariko Kawana
Kyōko Aizome vs Eri Kikuchi Double G-spot 愛染恭子VS菊池えり ダブルGスポット	2004-09-30	Alice Japan Babylon; KR-9217 (VHS); DV-396 (DVD)	Kyōko Aizome	With Eri Kikuchi
Love Sexuality あいぞめ	2005-02-25	Kazoo Planning Sizzle; SCS-01		Gravure video (non-sex)
Widow's Obscene Desire 愛欲の未亡人	2005-10-25	Madonna; JUKD-284
Mother and Son Incest 近親相姦 母と息子	2006-05-25	Madonna; JUKD-400
Retirement, the Last Production 引退、最後の本番… 愛染恭子	2010-09-13	Moodyz Gati; MIGD-356	Hara Ichigo

== Sources ==
- "愛染恭子 (Aizome Kyouko)" (in Japanese). Japanese Movie Database.
- "愛染 恭子 – Aizome Kyouko (Profile)". Web I-dic.
- Connell, Ryann (2006-12-04). "Surgeon says demise of hymen restoration operations no skin off his, er... nose?". Mainichi Shimbun. Archived from the original on 2008-01-01.
- "Former actress Kyōko Teranishi arrested for beating niece". Mainichi Shimbun. 2007-04-24.
- "Why did actress Kyōko Aizome beat her 14-year-old niece?". Translated by Fujii, Toshiya. "Shukan Post Watcher" at Japan Today. May 8, 2007. Archived from the original on May 17, 2007.
- "Hell hath no fury like a porn star scorned -- just ask her niece". Mainichi Shimbun. 2007-05-12.
- Koizumi, Shinichi (December 1, 2001). "Porn-star label now a badge of honor for actress". Asahi Shimbun. Archived from the original on 2001-12-03.
- "KYOKO AIZOME". Complete Index to World Film.
- Kyōko Aizome at IMDb
- "Kyōko Aizome". xxx.xcity.jp/SHIN-TOHO/. Archived from the original on 2007-03-10.
- description of Hakujitsumu and Aizome – cult-films review site
- "Profile" (in Japanese). Aizome.net. Archived from the original on 2007-05-28.
- Sharp, Jasper. "Hakujitsumu, Takechi Tetsuji, and Aizome". midnighteye.com.
