= Nao Saejima =

Japanese AV idol and model

- 冴島奈緒
- Born: March 23, 1968; Tokyo, Japan
- Died: September 29, 2012 (aged 44); Japan
- Occupations: gravure idol; AV idol; actress; singer
- Height: 1.58 m (5 ft 2 in)

Nao Saejima (Japanese: 冴島奈緒, Hepburn: Saejima Nao) (March 23, 1968 – September 29, 2012) was a Japanese pornographic actress and model of the 1980s and 1990s who also starred in photobooks, V-Cinema, and feature films, including Nikkatsu's Roman Porno series. She died in September 2012 of cancer at the age of 44.

== Life and career ==
=== AV career ===
Saejima was born in Tokyo on March 23, 1968. She began appearing as a gravure idol in 1985 and appeared on the nighttime TV variety show, 11 P.M. in 1987. She made her AV debut with VIP in February of the same year with No.1 F-Cup, Nao Saejima - Saejima's Awakening (冴島奈緒／FカップNo.1 奈緒の目覚め - Saejima Nao/F Kappu No. 1 Saejima no Mezame). With her slim figure and large breasts she quickly became a popular AV performer, appearing in at least 40 adult videos within two years of her debut including a 1987 entry in the Alice Japan "FlashBack" series directed by Rokurō Mochizuki. Along with fellow AV actresses Yui Saito and Midori Hayama, Saejima formed part of the pop group RaCCo-gumi, which in 1988 released the single Lemon Kiss. She ceased AV appearances beginning in 1990 but resumed her AV career again for a short time in 2002 after an absence of 12 years. During this time she worked as a nude model while traveling between the United States and Japan.

=== Theatrical career ===
Saejima appeared in one of Nikkatsu's last Roman Porno films in 1988. The studio ceased production of this long-running series of theatrical softcore porn films in 1988, and declared bankruptcy soon afterwards. Through its Excess Films line, the studio continued to release theatrical pornography for several more years. Nao Saejima was hired by Excess Films to star in her own theatrical release, Abnormal Excitement: Nao Saejima in 1989. Critical reaction to Saejima's performance was surprisingly positive, since AV performers were not thought capable of any genuine acting necessary for performing roles in theatrical films. This film has Saejima as a woman with the ability to communicate with the spirit world. She and her husband use this ability to swindle money out of grieving families of recently deceased. When the king of the spirit world learns of these shady practises, he kidnaps Saejima. Saejima's husband and a Chinese monk travel to the underworld to rescue her, encountering various bizarre sexual escapades on the way.

Among several other starring pink film and V-cinema roles in the 1990s, Saejima starred in Okura studio's Erotic Ghost Story: Female Ghost in Heat (色欲怪談 発情女ゆうれい, Shikiyoku Kaidan: Hatsujo Onna Yurei) (1995). In this supernatural sex-thriller she plays the role of the wife of a doctor who is haunted by a sex-hungry female spirit. The film was directed by Satoru Kobayashi, the director of the first pink film, Flesh Market (1962). As a result of Saejima's proven acting ability in these theatrical pink films, cult director Hisayasu Sato chose her for a major role in his second mainstream film, Meet Me In The Dream: Wonderland (1996). The prolific Sato's last film for over a year, it was based on Naoki Yamamoto's manga about a woman with obsessive-compulsive disorder.

=== Retirement and death ===
In later years Saejima also worked as a writer, a punk group vocalist, and a yoga instructor. After her retirement from public appearances in 2002 it was reported that she was working as an artist. In a sign of Saejima's international popularity, the Taiwan rock band, Goodbye!Nao! was named in tribute to her.

In 2007, Saejima participate in a live event of Dramatic Dream Team Pro Wrestling, winning the bizarre Ironman Heavymetalweight Championship two times in the same event.

Saejima died on September 29, 2012, having been stricken with cancer five years previously according to friends.

== Sources ==
- "NAO SAEJIMA". Complete Index to World Film.
- "冴島奈緒 - Nao Saejima" (in Japanese). 'Web I-dic' (Idol Dictionary). Archived from the original on 2012-07-10.
- "Nao Saejima". AV Idol Directory.
- "冴島奈緒 (Saejima Nao)" (in Japanese). JMDB.
- Weisser, Thomas; Yuko Mihara Weisser (1998). Japanese Cinema Encyclopedia: The Sex Films. Miami: Vital Books : Asian Cult Cinema Publications. pp. 35, 130. ISBN 1-889288-52-7.
- "冴島奈緒 (Moodyz profile and filmography)" (in Japanese). Moodyz. Archived from the original on 2008-03-08.
