= Hen (manga) =

Japanese manga series by Hiroya Oku

- First tankōbon volume cover (second series), featuring Chizuru Yoshida (left) and Azumi Yamada (right)

変
- Genre: Erotic comedy; Romantic comedy; Yaoi (Note: First series) / Yuri (Note: Second series)
- Manga
- Written by: Hiroya Oku
- Published by: Shueisha
- Imprint: Young Jump Comics
- Magazine: Weekly Young Jump
- Original run: 1989 – 1994
- Volumes: 13
- Manga
- Written by: Hiroya Oku
- Published by: Shueisha
- Imprint: Young Jump Comics
- Magazine: Weekly Young Jump
- Original run: 1995 – 1997
- Volumes: 8
- Television drama
- Directed by: Mitsunori Morita; Miki Nemoto
- Music by: Hiroya Watanabe
- Original network: TV Asahi
- Original run: April 7, 1996 – June 30, 1996
- Episodes: 12
- Original video animation

Strange Love
- Directed by: Daiji Suzuki
- Produced by: Katsuaki Takemoto; Takehiko Shimazu
- Written by: Mayori Sekijima
- Music by: Gōji Tsuno
- Studio: Group TAC
- Licensed by: NA: Central Park Media
- Released: March 21, 1997 – June 21, 1997
- Episodes: 2
- icon

Hen (変; lit. 'Strangeness') is a Japanese manga series written and illustrated by Hiroya Oku. There are two separate Hen series, both published in Shueisha's seinen manga magazine Weekly Young Jump; the first one from 1989 to 1994 and the second from 1995 to 1997. Both series received a television drama adaptation broadcast on TV Asahi in 1996. The second series received a two-episode original video animation (OVA) adaptation released in 1997. In North America, the OVA was licensed by Central Park Media, under the title Strange Love, and released on DVD in 2002.

== Plot ==
- First series ("Suzuki and Satō"):

Ichirō Suzuki (鈴木 一郎, Suzuki Ichirō), a straight young man who becomes besotted with another guy, Yūki Satō (佐藤 ゆうき, Satō Yūki), convinced his bishōnen love is a girl trapped in a boy's body. The first three volumes of this series collect Oku's early short stories, including prototype versions of both Hen series.

- Second series ("Chizuru and Azumi"):

Student Chizuru Yoshida, to her utmost horror, falls in love with another girl, the innocent Azumi Yamada. A prototype version of this story was published in the second volume of the first series.

== Characters ==
- Note: Characters from the second series

Chizuru Yoshida (吉田 ちずる, Yoshida Chizuru)
Voiced by: Atsuko Kichiya (Japanese); Sharon Becker (English)
Portrayed by: Asami Jō
A beautiful and perfect high school student who excels in everything she does, Chizuru is every man's dream and she knows it. A promiscuous and very sexually active person who plays men for whatever she wants, the young model has a great life until she meets her current fling's new neighbors. Instantly Chizuru, a girl who has never known love, falls heavily for the young female neighbor, Azumi Yamada. Chizuru, refusing to admit it at first, quickly comes to realize she must be with Azumi at any cost. Now living with her fake boyfriend, Hiroyuki, just one apartment away from Azumi, she puts forth every effort to constantly be around her crush. She has an interesting physique compared to other female characters; although she is slender, she has large breasts in contrast to the rest of her willowy figure. The English dub portrays Chizuru as an older teenage college student whereas in the Japanese version she is in high school and around 16 to 17 years old.
Azumi Yamada (山田 あずみ, Yamada Azumi)
Voiced by: Ayumi Sakurai (Japanese); Allison Keith (English)
Portrayed by: Miho Kiuchi
Azumi is an innocent and average looking high school student. However, after moving from Kyushu to a new city and new apartment complex she meets Chizuru. At first the friendly Azumi tries to be nice to Chizuru, only to be harshly rejected. Eventually though, the two become friends, although Azumi fears that there might be something weird about Chizuru. Azumi, who wishes to become a screenwriter, one day attempts to join the drama club. There she befriends a young, amateur film maker named Ryuichi Kobayashi.
Ryuichi Kobayashi (小林 龍一, Kobayashi Ryūichi)
Portrayed by: Yosuke Kubozuka
Ryuichi is also a newly transferred high school student who enjoys making movies in his free time. Upon meeting Chizuru in the infirmary, he quickly falls in love with her face, wishing for her to be an actress in one of his movies. Ryuichi eventually befriends Azumi as they attempt to join the drama club.
Sushiaki Karasawa (唐沢 寿明, Karasawa Sushiaki)
Voiced by: Takehito Koyasu (Japanese); Vinnie Penna (English)
Portrayed by: Hiroki Okayasu
Karasawa, who appears as the main character for several of the opening chapters, is a new teacher at Momoyuri College (high school in the Japanese version), the same school Chizuru and Azumi attend. He quickly falls in love with Chizuru after recognizing her as a model. After a little effort, Karasawa is able to trick Chizuru into admitting she is a model, infuriating her. She then convinces Karasawa to let her sleep at his apartment for the night, where she enacts vengeance through teasing him to some degree or another throughout the night.
Hiroyuki (ヒロユキ)
Voiced by: Akira Ishida (Japanese); Hideo Seaver (English)
Portrayed by: Shinsuke Aoki
A young Japanese rock star, living in his parents' mansion and on their money, he was yet another fling of the beautiful Chizuru. However, when his new neighbors moved in with their daughter Azumi Yamada, Chizuru quickly claimed him as her boyfriend. Hiroyuki, realizing that Chizuru has a crush on Azumi, but truly believing that she loves him, has formed a plan to seduce and sleep with Azumi, ruining her for Chizuru.

== Media ==
=== Manga ===
First volume cover of the first manga series

Written and illustrated by Hiroya Oku, the prototype of Hen was selected as a semi-finalist at the 19th Youth Manga Awards in 1988. The manga started an irregular serialization in Shueisha's seinen manga magazine Weekly Young Jump the following year; it started a weekly serialization in 1992, and finished in 1994. Shueisha collected its chapters in thirteen tankōbon volumes, released from April 25, 1991, to April 24, 1995; a four-volume shinsoban edition was published from October 19, 2000, to January 19, 2001; and a nine-volume bunkoban edition was released from April 18 to September 15, 2006.

Another series, also titled Hen (stylized in Latin script), was serialized in Weekly Young Jump from 1995 to 1997. Shueisha collected its chapters in eight tankōbon volumes, released from September 24, 1995, to June 24, 1997. A six-volume bunkoban edition was released from February 18 to June 17, 2011.

=== Drama ===
A television drama adaptation was broadcast on TV Asahi in 1996. The first half, adapting the first series and starring Shinsuke Aoki as Ichirō Suzuki and actress Aiko Sato as Yūki Satō, was broadcast for seven episodes from April 7 to May 19; (Note: Originally broadcast on Saturday at 24:00, which is effectively Sunday at midnight JST.) the second half, adapting the second series and starring Asami Jō as Chizuru Yoshida and Miho Kiuchi as Azumi Yamada, was broadcast for five episodes from May 26 to June 30. Art Five re-released the series on two DVD boxes (each containing each part) in November 2006.

=== Original video animation ===
A two-episode original video animation (OVA) adaptation of the second series, "Chizuru and Azumi", animated by Group TAC and directed by Daiji Suzuki, was released by Toei Video on March 21 and June 21, 1997.

In North America, the OVA was licensed by Central Park Media and released on DVD, under the title Strange Love, on February 12, 2002.
