= Sex and Zen =

1991 Hong Kong film by Michael Mak

- Film poster
- Traditional Chinese: 玉蒲團之偷情寶鑑
- Simplified Chinese: 玉蒲团之偷情宝鉴
- Hanyu Pinyin: Ròupútuán zhī tōuqíng bǎojiàn
- Jyutping: Juk6 Pou4 Tyun4 Zi1 Tau1 Cing4 Bou2 Gaam3
- Directed by: Michael Mak
- Screenplay by: Lee Ying Kit
- Story by: Li Yu
- Produced by: Stephen Shiu
- Starring: Amy Yip; Lawrence Ng; Lo Lieh; Kent Cheng
- Cinematography: Peter Ngor
- Edited by: Poon Hung
- Music by: Joseph Chan
- Distributed by: Golden Harvest; Fortune Star
- Release date: 30 November 1991
- Running time: 99 minutes
- Country: Hong Kong
- Language: Cantonese
- Box office: HK$18.4 million

Sex and Zen (Chinese: 玉蒲團之偷情寶鑑, The Carnal Prayer Mat's Stash of Illicit Love) is a 1991 Hong Kong erotic sex comedy film directed by Michael Mak, and starring Amy Yip and Lawrence Ng. The film is loosely based on The Carnal Prayer Mat, a Chinese erotic novel by seventeenth-century author and playwright Li Yu.

== Plot ==
The story is about Mei Yeung-Sheng, a lustful scholar (Lawrence Ng), who dares to challenge the moral teachings of the Sack Monk. The monk attempts to lecture the scholar that enlightenment transcends the passions of the flesh but the scholar, who enjoys women, doesn't agree. However, Master Iron Doors, the most powerful man in the town, marries his daughter Huk-Yeung (Amy Yip) to the scholar. The daughter is a virgin and has been taught that sex is dirty.

Choi Kun-Lun, the flying thief (Lo Lieh), tells the scholar that stealing other men's wives requires good sex skills and equipment. He promises to help the scholar only if he has a horse's penis. Of course, the thief does not think it is possible, until the scholar returns one day, indeed, with a horse's penis attached as his own. Apparently, the scholar met a doctor (a cameo by Hong Kong comedian Kent Cheng) who was able to replace anatomical parts.

The doctor managed to transplant a horse's penis to replace the scholar's meager one. Armed with his new 20-inch penis, the scholar goes on a sexual rampage, not caring if he is seducing other men's wives or is nearly caught in the process. Meanwhile, Huk-Yeung, after experiencing the joys of sex, becomes sexually frustrated. She tries masturbating with paintbrushes but is left unsatisfied until she has an affair with Wong Chut (Elvis Tsui), the husband of one of the wives the scholar seduced, who is now working as Yeung-Sheng's gardener. She becomes pregnant and runs away with him, who out of revenge sells her to a brothel. Mistress Ku, the madam (Carrie Ng), assaults her leading to a miscarriage, originally unwilling she is coerced into becoming a prostitute and comes to enjoy her new life.

The scholar has become frail and sick due to too much sex (involving two sisters-in-law who are bisexual and into S&M). He goes to the brothel for treatment, where he is offered the top courtesan. At first, husband and wife cannot recognize each other; she looks at his penis and thinks it cannot be her husband's because his is small; he cannot recognize her because his eyesight is failing.

While they are having sex, he takes a close look at her figure and nipple and recognizes her. To her dismay, he screams, shouts and calls her a disgrace. To his dismay, she runs off and hangs herself. Yeung-Sheng, completely broken, goes back to the monk to ask for forgiveness.

== Cast ==
- Amy Yip - Huk-Yeung/Chau-Yin
- Lawrence Ng - Mei Yeung-Sheng
- Kent Cheng - Dr. Tin Chan
- Lo Lieh - Choi Kun-Lun
- Carrie Ng - Mistress Ku
- Isabella Chow - Shui Chu
- Rena Murakami - Fa Sun (as Tomoko Ino)
- Mari Ayukawa - Wong Chut's wife
- Tim Wong - Emil Wu
- Tien Feng - Master Iron Doors (uncredited)
- Elvis Tsui - Wong Chut (uncredited)

== Box office ==
In Hong Kong, the film grossed HK$18,424,224. This was enormous business considering the film was saddled with the restrictive Category III rating (the Hong Kong equivalent of NC-17 in the US).

== Critical reception ==
Metacritic, which uses a weighted average, assigned the film a score of 58 out of 100, based on 8 critics, indicating "mixed or average" reviews. Roger Ebert of the Chicago Sun-Times gave the film three stars out of four and wrote, "Hey, it's no masterpiece. It is what it is: soft-core eroticism. But on that basis, it succeeds."

== Sequels ==
Sex and Zen went on to spin off two sequels, Sex and Zen II and Sex and Zen III. These are not sequels in plot, as each movie illustrates a different story also based on the sex manual.

== See also ==
- 3D Sex and Zen: Extreme Ecstasy
