= Asami Jō =

Japanese actress from Tokyo

- 城麻美
- Born: 15 September 1975 (age 50); Tokyo, Japan
- Other names: Yumi Kayama; Ayuko Kunitachi
- Height: 1.62 m (5 ft 4 in)

Asami Jō (城麻美, Jō Asami; born September 15, 1975), also spelled Asami Joh, is a Japanese actress and former AV Idol from Tokyo. Fans of tokusatsu TV shows also know her as the villain Shibolena in the Super Sentai series Denji Sentai Megaranger.

== Life and career ==
=== Adult video actress ===
Jō was born in Tokyo on September 15, 1975, and was a TV commercial model before starting a career in the adult entertainment industry. She was appearing on the late-night TV show Gilgamesh Night when she made her debut in adult videos (AV) at age twenty for the Alice Japan studio with A Bare Skin Jennu in October 1995.

While many Japanese AVs involve some form of documentary style, Asami Jō's videos are mainly in the fictional style of the pink film and early AV. Her February 1996 release for Alice Japan, Love Potion, told the story of a woman who supports her boyfriend financially while he is studying to become a lawyer. She employs sex as a means to make cosmetic sales. Thrilling Club: A Scandalous Night With You (April 1996), had Jō as a married woman who meets an old classmate, with whom she and her husband engage in a menage-a-trois.

In The Beautiful Slave (May 1996), she played the role of a young woman who is unhappy with the marriage her parents have arranged for her. Obscene Model (June 1996) had Jō in the role of a woman who acts like a cat in heat and when she is taken to a veterinarian engages in wild sex with him. In Top Secret Is Full Nude, released in July 1996, she played a woman who is raped by a man who is later hired by her husband, for whose company she also works. Almost Broken was an organized crime melodrama with Jō escaping from a gang and becoming involved in telephone sex. Like the previously-described videos, this August 1996 release was an Alice Japan production.

=== Mainstream actress ===
Jō was a regular cast member on the erotic-themed nighttime TV show Gilgamesh Night from 1995 to 1998. In April 1996 she played the character "Kaoru" in the theatrical film Kunoichi Ninpo Cho Gekijo Ban Ninja Getsueisho (くノ一忍法帖 劇場版 忍者月影抄), part of a long running series of "Female Ninja" (Kunoichi) movies. Beginning in February 1996, she also starred in a number of direct-to-video V-cinema productions including La Blue Girl Live 2: Live Birth of the Demon Child and La Blue Girl Live 3: Lady Ninja.

Also in 1996, she starred in the fantasy comedy TV series HEN Vol. 2 broadcast by TV Asahi from May to June 1996. Later in 1996, she starred in another TV show, Shiyou yo 2: Onna kyōshi Nazuna no baai, a comedy broadcast on TV Asahi from November to December 1996.

Jō landed a more extensive TV role in Denji Sentai Megaranger playing the character of Shibolena, an android from the Evil Electric Kingdom Nezirejia who was modeled after the long dead daughter of the leader of Nejirejia invasion party. She also appeared in the series as her younger android sibling Hizumina. This TV Asahi series ran in 51 installments from February 1997 to February 1998. She reprised the character of Shibolena for the V-cinema production Denji Sentai Megaranger vs. Carranger (電磁戦隊メガレンジャーVSカーレンジャー, Denji Sentai Megarenjā tai Kārenjā) originally released in March 1998.

== Appearances ==
=== Adult Videos ===
Release date	Video title	Company	Director	Notes
October 20, 1995	A Bare Skin Jennu 素肌ジェンヌ	Alice Japan; KA-1756	Yuji Sakamoto	AV Debut
VHS:November 17, 1995; VCD:May 22, 1998	My Pure Lady	Alice Japan; KA-1762 (VHS); DC-031 (VCD)	Kyosuke Murayama	
December 19, 1995	Hold Me, Love Me 恋に抱かれて	Atlas21 Oz; OZ-5123		
January 26, 1996	Sensual Heroine 官能ヒロイン	Alice Japan; KA-1775	TOHJIRO	
February 23, 1996	Love Potion	Alice Japan; KA-1778	Futoshi Kamino	
April 19, 1996	Thrilling Club: A Scandalous Night With You スリリング ラブ スキャンダルな夜をあなたと	Alice Japan; KA-1786	Yuji Sakamoto	
May 17, 1996	The Beautiful Slave 美顔隷壌	Alice Japan; KA-1789	Kyosuke Murayama	
June 14, 1996	Obscene Model/Y-Setsu Model 猥褻モデル	Alice Japan; KA-1794	Kyosuke Murayama	
July 12, 1996	Top Secret Is Full Nude アソコはフルヌード	Alice Japan; KA-1798	Kenryu Namiri	
August 6, 1996	Super Collection Asami Jo 城麻美 スーパーコレクション	Alice Japan; DID-02		CD-ROM
August 9, 1996	Almost Broken aka Serious Condition of Love 壊れかけの愛辱	Alice Japan; KA-1802	Kenryu Namiri	
October 11, 2000	No Cut 4 Hours: Asami Jo ノーカット4時間！！ 城麻美	Alice Japan; DV-183		Compilation DVD containing 4 videos, including My Pure Lady
December 24, 2000	No Cut 4 Hours: Asami Jo vol. 2 ノーカット4時間！！ 城麻美	Alice Japan; DV-202		Compilation DVD of her earlier videos
February 17, 2006	Alice Memorial 1995 アリス・メモリアル 1995	Alice Japan; DV-583		Compilation with other actresses

=== Image video ===
- Gilgame Angel: Asami Jo (1995)

=== V-Cinema ===
- La Blue Girl Live 2: Live Birth of the Demon Child (February 24, 1996)
- La Blue Girl Live 3: Lady Ninja (February 24, 1996)
- Lady Ninja: Reflections of Darkness (April 13, 1996)
- Nippon Bicycle Race Academy - It's Youth! (May 3, 1997)
- Denji Sentai Megaranger vs Carranger (March 13, 1998)
- Tokyo Night Wars (May 1, 1998)
- Underage Sex Offender Report (July 1, 1998)
- Seiju Sentai Gingaman vs Megaranger (March 12, 1999)

=== Movies ===
- Kunoichi Ninpo Cho Gekijo Ban Ninja Getsueisho (くノ一忍法帖 劇場版 忍者月影抄) (April 1996)
- Break Heat バクの胃袋を開け! (February 14, 1998) as Ginko Ishida

=== TV shows ===
- Gilgamesh Night (April, 1995 - March 28, 1998)
- HEN (1996)
- Shiyou yo 2 (しようよ２ 女教師ナズナの場合) (1996)
- Weatherwoman 2: Ryoko PuriPuri (お天気お姉さん２ リョーコＰｕｒｉＰｕｒｉ) (1997)
- Denji Sentai Megaranger (1997–1998)

== Pictorial Books ==
- "Asami Jo Pictorial" (Scholar, September 1995) ISBN 4-7962-0315-X
- "Hinano" (Eichi Press, June 1996) ISBN 4-7542-1127-8
- "Sora" (Eichi Press, March 1997) ISBN 4-7542-1154-5
