= Masatoshi Akihara =

Japanese film director

Masatoshi Akihara (秋原 正俊, Akihara Masatoshi) is a Japanese film director.

== Filmography ==
- Umi no Yume, Tokai no Kyo (海の夢、都会の虚) (2004)
- Break Out ブレイクアウト! (2005)
- Flowers at Noon (真昼の花, Marihu no hana) (2005)
- I Carry the Ticket of Eternity (銀河鉄道の夜, Ginga tetsudō no yoru) (2006)
- Gojū no Tō (五重塔) (2007)
- White Camellia (白椿, Shirotsubaki) (2007)
- The Story of Ito (伊藤の話, Ito no Hanashi) (2008)
- The Setting Sun (斜陽, Shayō) (2009)
- Rupan no kiganjô (ルパンの奇蹟) (2011)
- Kumo no ito (雲の伊藤) (2011)

== Sources ==
- "Matsatoshi Akihara". IMDb.
- "秋原正俊 (Akihara Matsatoshi)" (in Japanese). JMDb.
- 秋原正俊 あきはら・まさとし (in Japanese). All Cinema.
- "Matsatoshi Akihara". IMDb.
