= Ai Iijima =

Japanese television personality (1972–2008)

- 飯島 愛
- Ai Iijima as a mainstream TV celebrity
- Born: 31 October 1972; Kameido, Koto, Tokyo, Japan
- Died: December 17, 2008 (aged 36); Shibuya, Tokyo, Japan
- Other name: Ai Candy
- Height: 1.63 m (5 ft 4 in)

Ai Iijima (Japanese: 飯島 愛, Hepburn: Iijima Ai; October 31, 1972 – December 17, 2008) was a Japanese media personality, writer, activist and actress who was an AV idol early in her career, starring in more than 100 films. She later became the hostess on the nighttime television program, Gilgamesh Night, and transitioned away from AV work. After ending her career in adult videos, Iijima released a musical single Naisho DE Ai! Ai! (ナイショ DE アイ!アイ!) in July 1993 and soon became a regular on daytime TV talk shows. Iijima became involved in campaigns to educate the public about HIV/AIDS, a cause that few Japanese celebrities were willing to undertake.

On December 24, 2008 at about 3:30 p.m. (JST), Iijima was found dead in her 21st floor Tokyo apartment. Pathology examination showed she had died of pneumonia shortly after retiring from the public eye.

== Life and career ==
Born as Matsue Okubo (大久保松恵, Ōkubo Matsue) in Tokyo, Japan, Iijima described a troubled early life in her autobiography. She was raped in her early teens and had an abortion. She ran away from home as a teenager, later stating, "I hated my parents, to the point where I would rather be coached by bums to sleep in parks wrapped in newspaper blankets." In order to make a living during this time, Iijima worked in karaoke establishments, snack bars, Ginza hostess clubs, and in enjo kōsai (paid dating).

=== Early career ===
Iijima's adult video (AV) debut was All That Sexy Venus for the Tairiku Shobo Company's FOXY label in April 1992. She quickly became the top AV actress of the time, appearing in over 100 films. She entered mainstream media as a hostess on the nighttime television program, Gilgamesh Night, where she became known as the "T-Back Queen", for her practice of turning her rear to the camera, lifting her skirt and flashing her G-string, known in Japan as a "T-Back". In addition to adult videos in the early 1990s, Iijima also acted in a number of softcore V-cinema works including the August 1992 comedy Yuke yuke AV shinsengumi: Tenshi tachi no H na daisensō (ゆけゆけＡＶ新撰組 天使たちのＨな大戦争) (with Hitomi Shiraishi), and the erotic suspense comedy Costume Gourmet: T-Back Bride (コスチューム・グルメ Tバックの花嫁), released in January 1993 by Japan Home Video. One of the top AV models by the age of 20, with admitted breast implants, a nose job, eyebrow work and bottom work as well, she decided to leave the porn business, intent on a career in mainstream entertainment.

After ending her career in adult videos, Iijima released a musical single Naisho DE Ai! Ai! (ナイショ DE アイ!アイ!) in July 1993 and soon became a regular on daytime TV talk shows. Before long, she became one of the most successful tarento to make the transition from pornography into mainstream entertainment. In December 1993, she debuted in mainstream film playing an angel come down to Earth in the Toei Company fantasy Purupuru tenshi teki kyūjitsu (ぷるぷる 天使的休日). She even provided the story for her own manga series, Time Traveler Ai, in which she was featured as the main character. Publicly, Iijima became known for her outspokenness and ability to speak frankly about her past and her personal life. Privately, a friend says, "At first glance, Ai appears really rough around the edges, but she's actually really sensitive, and she always thinks of others in ways like giving them little presents. She's that type."

Iijima also worked in video games as well. In 1995, she also voice acted for the main protagonist of the video game Magical Pop'n. In 1997, she released a video game for the Sega Saturn called Good Island Cafe. The game operates like an interactive movie, where players can make clips in black and white, and watch an interview with her. The game is entirely in Japanese.

=== Platonic Sex ===
In 2000, Iijima published Platonic Sex, a semi-autobiographical novel about a young girl who leaves home to escape her parents and ends up as an adult movie star. The book was a best-seller, selling over 1.7 million copies. By 2004, the book had been translated into Korean, Chinese, Spanish and Italian. She visited Taiwan where her book was a best-seller on a promotional tour in February 2001 and was "besieged by journalists" at the airport. Iijima had been popular in Taiwan since the early 1990s when her adult videos began to be imported and she remained a celebrity there for her entire career.

Her novel became the basis for a toned down three-hour television series starring Mari Hoshino which was broadcast by Fuji Television in two parts in September 2001. Another adaptation of the novel with Saki Kagami in the lead role was released as an R15 rated theatrical film by Toho in October 2001 titled Platonic Sex. This version had Iijima credited as author (原作) and supervisor (監修). Iijima's catchphrase, "watashi teki ni" ("my way"), became well known due to the popularity of the book and the movies.

It was also at this time that Iijima became involved in campaigns to educate the public about HIV/AIDS, a cause that few Japanese celebrities were willing to undertake. Iijima continued her activities for this cause in public forums and in her blog for the rest of her life.

=== Later career ===
By 2002, Iijima had become a regular on several TV shows. With her pornographic video past a decade away, Iijima was so well known as a mainstream TV celebrity that many younger members of her audience were unaware that she had once been one of the top AV actresses. Items from her early career began going for high prices, and an unauthorized 2002 box-set release of her adult videos sold very well, until her lawyers took it off the market.

Iijima's acceptance into the mainstream gave her access to the highest levels of Japanese society, including once having dinner with Junichiro Koizumi, who was Japan's Minister of Health and Welfare at the time. Iijima claims that on this occasion, the future Prime Minister discussed the sex life of dragonflies with her.

In November 2004, Iijima was invited to speak about her past at the Foreign Correspondents' Club of Japan. Later the same month, she participated in a United Nations program in Tokyo on AIDS awareness in the week leading up to World AIDS Day on December 1, 2004. She made cameo appearances in the 2005 horror film The Curse (Noroi) and the September 2006 police show parody,The Rug Cop (ヅラ刑事（ヅラデカ）, Zura deka).

=== Retirement ===
After the difficulties of her early life, Iijima's career in mainstream entertainment had been remarkably free of trouble for over a decade until she was victimized by an embezzler at her talent agency, who took about 100 million yen from her. Late in 2006, she took two weeks off from her position as a panelist on the Sunday morning TV variety show, Sunday Japon. She later revealed in her blog that she was suffering from health problems, causing rumors of her possible retirement from show business to circulate in the press. In March 2007, when asked by the host of Sunday Japon whether rumors of her retirement were true, Iijima replied, "Yes, I have been wanting to quit for some time. I will announce my future plans next week."

Iijima's farewell appearance was at the end of March 2007 on the TV program KinSuma, on which she had been a regular for five years. It was described as "a teary two-hour sayonara party complete with speeches, bouquets and lots of blubbering". However, when psychic Fujiko Kimura confronted Iijima on the program, telling her not to retire and suggesting that there was more behind the retirement announcement than had been made public, Iijima "seemed to admit as much and was reduced to tears." Whatever the circumstances leading to the decision, Ai Iijima's retirement at the age of 34 brought an end to what has been called "one of the more remarkable careers in the cutthroat Japanese entertainment world".

=== Death ===
On December 24, 2008, at about 3:30 p.m. (JST), Iijima was found dead in her 21st floor Tokyo apartment, not far from Shibuya Crossing. She was found lying face-down on the floor when medics forced their way into her place. She had been dead for about seven days, police said. On March 3, 2007, Sports Nippon had reported that Ai Iijima was suffering from hay fever, pyelitis (ascending urinary tract infection that has reached the pyelum (pelvis) of the kidney), cystitis, and acute backache. She had written in her blog that she had kidney problems and inflammation of the urinary tract and bladder. In February 2009, police announced that the pathology examination showed she had died of pneumonia, and that there was no suggestion of either suicide or murder.

On March 1, 2009, a memorial service for Iijima was held at the Tokyo Prince Hotel with 700 friends and relatives attending. Later in the day, some 1500 people offered prayers as the service was opened to the public. All proceeds for the day went to the Japan Foundation for AIDS Prevention. Iijima was given a posthumous Special Award at the 9th Takeshi Kitano Entertainment Awards for 2009.
