= Kayo Satoh =

Japanese model and TV personality

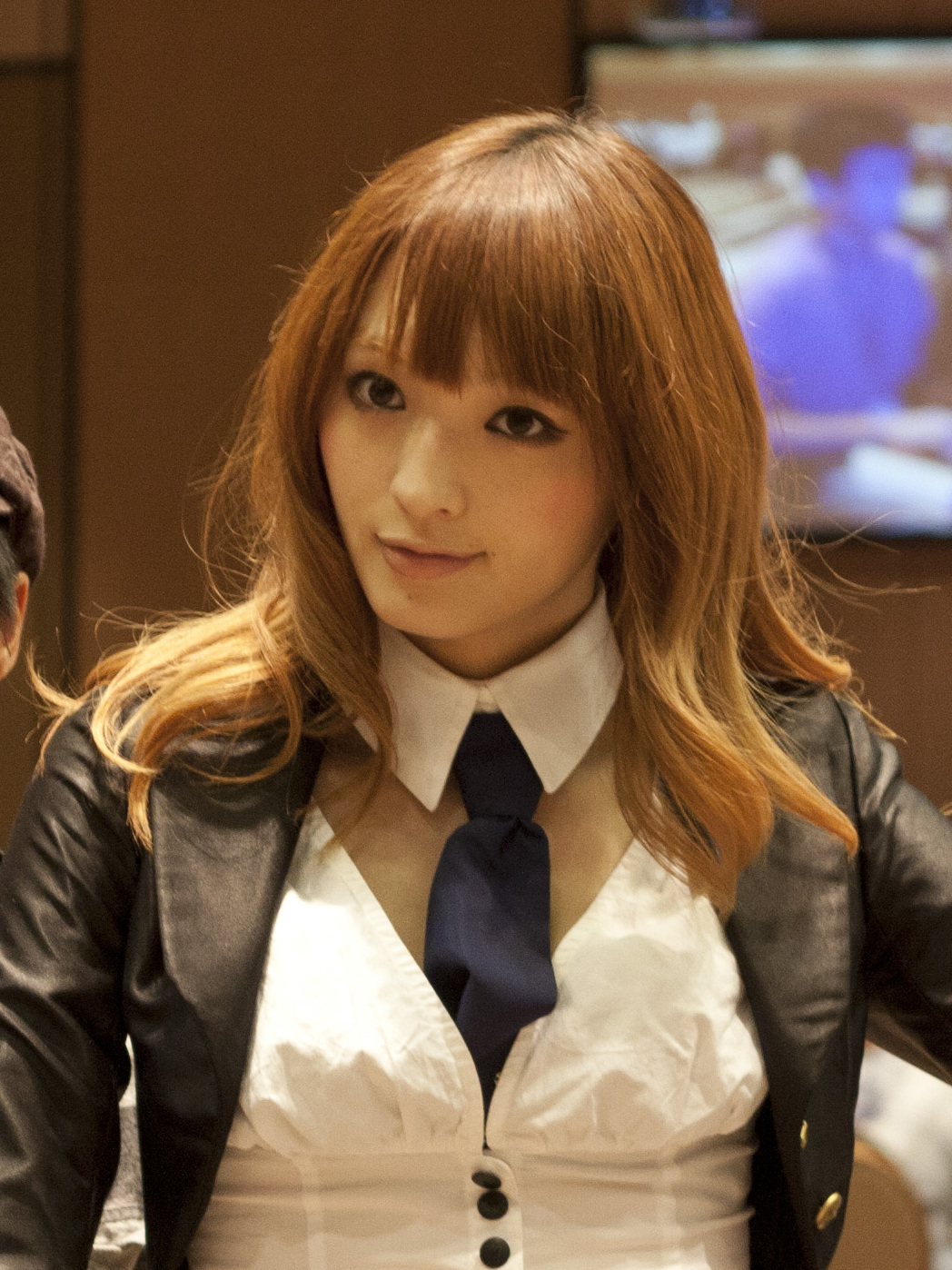
- Satoh at Evo 2011
- Born: December 26, 1988 (age 37); Aichi Prefecture, Japan
- Other name: Kayo Police
- Occupations: Model, TV personality
- Modeling information
- Agency: Asia Promotion
- Website: ameblo.jp/pixy-kayo/

Kayo Satoh (佐藤 かよ, Satō Kayo; born December 26, 1988 in Aichi Prefecture) is a Japanese model and television personality. She gained fame in Japan and overseas in September 2010 when she announced on her blog that she had been assigned male at birth.

== TV appearances ==
- Don! (NTV), 21 September 2010
- Wake Ari "Hi" Otakara Eizō Matsuri Dōga! Inpukato Ōkoku (ワケあり［秘］お宝映像祭 動画！インパクト王国) (NTV), 22 September 2010

== Books ==
- Re-born, Kodansha, 23 June 2011, ISBN 978-4-06-389544-5
