= Max-A =

Japanese pornographic film studio

- Industry: Pornography
- Founded: 1992
- Headquarters: Japan
- Products: Pornographic films
- Website: http://www.max-a.co.jp/top.php

MAX-A (マックス・エー, Makkusu Ē) is a Japanese adult video (AV) studio which is especially known for videos made under its Samansa ("Samantha") and Calen ("Karen") labels which produced a number of innovative and quality AVs in the late 1990s and early 2000s.

== Company information ==
The Max-A studio released its first video May 23, 1992 on the Calen label (with the catalog XC-1001), Calen Falls in Love (恋するカレン), featuring Saori Kawana and directed by Hajime Kitano. A week later, on May 30, 1992, the first Samansa label video, Witch-Wife (白石ひとみの奥様は魔女), directed by Kunihiro Hasegawa and starring AV Idol Hitomi Shiraishi, came out with the production code XS-2001 on May 30, 1992.

Max-A has had a long association dating back to at least 1997 with the Kuki group of companies, at one time the largest family of AV companies in Japan, comprising Kuki, Alice Japan, Atlas21, Media Station (Cosmos Plan), Big Morkal and Sexia. The companies in this group all belonged to the voluntary ethics organization called in English the Nihon Ethics of Video Association (NEVA) or in Japanese 日本ビデオ倫理協会 (Nippon Bideo Rinri Kyoukai or Japan Video Morality Association) usually abbreviated as ビデ倫 (Biderin or Viderin). As with other members of the Kuki group, the emphasis at Max-A has been on making videos featuring a single popular actress. The company reported that for 2003, the leading actresses in sales were Maria Takagi, Ryōko Mitake, Sora Aoi, and Akiho Yoshizawa. Among the actresses who have made their AV debut with Max-A are Hitomi Hayasaka in 2001, Yua Aida in 2004, and Rio (Tina Yuzuki) in 2005.

Max-A operates its official website at www.max-a.co.jp where it has videos available for download via subscription. The studio also has a site on the X City webpage along with other members of the Kuki group of companies where on-demand videos are featured. About 16 new videos are issued monthly by Max-A under its various labels.

== Labels ==
In addition to the Samansa, Calen and MAX-A labels, the company has also used several other labels over its history. VHS videos made under the Calen label used production codes of the series type XC-1001 and Samansa-labeled VHS works used the XS-2001 type series. Gash VHS videos utilized the XG-3001 series. When DVDs came into production, the company used production codes of the XV-001 type under the MAX-A label and when VHS tapes were discontinued, the Calen and Samansa labels were no longer used. DVDs "for rental only" were issued with the code type SRXV-001.

- B-MAX
- Black Max
- Blue File (ブルーファイル)
- Calen (カレン)
- DoraMax
- Gash
- Max Pink
- Naked Film
- Pure Max
- Samansa (サマンサ)

== Directors ==
The following are among the directors who have worked with Max-A:

- Yoshiho Fukuoka
- Kunihiro Hasegawa
- Yukinori Nishizawa
- Yukihiko Shimamura
- Goro Tameike
- Toshiou

== Actresses ==
Actresses who have performed in Max-A videos include:

- Yua Aida
- Minori Aoi
- Sora Aoi
- Minami Aoyama
- Ami Ayukawa
- Cecil Fujisaki
- Hitomi Hayasaka
- Rei Itoh
- Bunko Kanazawa
- Mariko Kawana
- Kyōko Kazama
- Aino Kishi
- You Kitajima
- Hitomi Kobayashi
- Miho Maeshima
- Mihiro
- Ryōko Mitake
- Rio (Tina Yuzuki)
- Hitomi Shiraishi
- Riko Tachibana
- Maria Takagi
- Sally Yoshino
- Nao Yoshizaki
- Akiho Yoshizawa
- Yui Hoshino

== X City Awards ==
Max-A was one of the Kuki group of companies which participated in the X City Adult Video Grand Prix Awards which were held from 1998 to 2004. In the 2003 contest, the Max-A cosplay video Welcome to Max Cafe!: Maria Takagi (Max Cafeへようこそ！ 高樹マリア) starring Maria Takagi won the Best Video Title Award.

== Series ==
A list of some popular Max-A video series:

- Dirty Mouth (淫口)
- Illegal Tits Violation (不法侵乳)
- MAX GIRLS
- New Comer
- OL Style
- Pink File
- School Days
- The Secret of Younger Sister (妹の秘密)
- Sexy Teacher Hunt
- Uniform Hunting (制服狩り)
- Welcome to Max Airline (Max Airlineへようこそ)
- Welcome to Black Max Cafe! (Black Max Cafeへようこそ!)
- Welcome to Max Cafe! (ようこそMaxCafeへ!)
- Welcome to Max Soap (ウェルカム マックス・ソープ)
