= Reiko Hayama =

Japanese actress (born 1969)

- 葉山 レイコ
- Born: July 13, 1969 (age 56); Nagoya, Japan
- Occupation: Actress

Reiko Hayama (葉山 レイコ, Hayama Reiko; born 13 July 1969) is a Japanese actress.

== Filmography ==
Year	Title	Role	Note
1991	Female Ninja Magic Chronicles		
1991	The Tales of the Upper Realm of Suffering	Osugi	
1992	The Wicked City (1992)	Perrier	
1996	Roshutsukyo no onna	Saeko	
2012	My Wife's Lover		
2014	Hōzuki-san Chi no Aneki	Hōzuki Mariko	
2014	Recently, My Sister Is Unusual (2014)		
2014	The Torture Club		
