= Don Fernando =

American pornographic actor and director (born 1948)

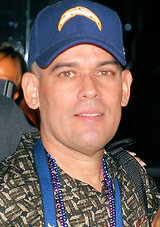
- Fernando in 2006
- Born: April 12, 1948 (age 78); San Francisco, California, US
- Other names: Asianman, Mr. Reliable, Superman of Video Sex, Mr. Camera
- Height: 5 ft 8 in (1.73 m)

Don Fernando (born April 12, 1948) is an American director and actor of pornographic films. He started in the pornography business in 1977 and performed for 39 consecutive years; the longest tenure for any male pornographic film actor in the world, until his retirement in 2016 at which time, he started a successful wedding video/documentary business based in Honolulu. Because of his high libido and sexual endurance during his performances in adult film and video productions on 3 continents, he was known in the United States and Europe as "Mr. Reliable", and in Japan as "Superman of Video Sex". As a director, he specialized in performing with Asian females, and thus earned the moniker "Asianman". He won the Best Supporting Actor Award twice (1995 and in 2005) during the Festival de Cine Erotica-Barcelona Fernando was inducted into the X-Rated Critics Organization Hall of Fame in 1997. In 1998, he started directing and still continued acting for another 18 years in "old man with young woman" X-rated films in Budapest, well into his late 60's. In 1999, he opened his personal website named Don Fernando's Asian X Club, featuring Asian and Eurasian females, many of which performed exclusively in front of his cameras. He was inducted into the AVN Hall of Fame during the 2004 AVN Awards.
