= Rui Sakuragi =

Japanese pornographic actress

- 桜樹ルイ
- Born: Miki Ebisawa; March 8, 1970 (age 56); Japan
- Other names: Masako Ichinose; Miki Aizawa
- Height: 1.64 m (5 ft 4 1/2 in)

Rui Sakuragi (Japanese: 桜樹ルイ, Hepburn: Sakuragi Rui), is a former Japanese pornographic actress, model and erotic dancer who has been described as a "real AV [pornographic movie] Queen", the "top Japanese AV idol of the mid-1990s" and the "biggest star" in AV in 1992. She has also appeared widely in mainstream films and videos and on TV.

== Life and career ==
Rui Sakuragi was born on March 8, 1970. After having previously been a "gravure" (non-sex) model, she made her adult video (AV) debut for the VIP label in April 1989 under the name Masako Ichinose but took the name Rui Sakuragi the following year. She sometimes worked for other studios but VIP (and its successor Atlas21) was her main label for the next two years. Her work for them included a seven-man orgy in Golden Pavilion Temple 2 and cosplay in The Uniform Connection Special. Sakuragi announced that her April 1992 release for VIP, The Last of Rui Sakuragi would be her final work and left with a tearful farewell.

According to a 1992 article, whereas an attractive leading lady in AV could command 1.5 to 2 million yen (about $10,000 to $15,000) for a video, "Sakuragi, the biggest star at present" made 3 million yen (more than $20,000) per project.

Although Sakuragi had married just before her retirement, she became bored with her new lifestyle and started working as a stripper in clubs throughout Japan. Almost four years later, divorced, and in need of money, Sakuragi returned to AV with a contract with Atlas21 for three videos beginning with Phoenix Once Again in March 1996. After the third video, Super AV Idol Legend, fan response convinced her to do a fourth and final film, Good Bye Rui Sakuragi. Since her retirement, Atlas21, Kuki, and Alice Japan have all released compilations of her earlier videos.

During her AV career and after her retirement, Sakuragi also worked extensively in mainstream movies and softcore pink film and V-Cinema productions. In February 1992 she appeared in Sakuragi Rui: Gushonure Kahanshin, directed by the noted pink film woman director Sachi Hamano. Another early movie was the March 1992 Paris Fantasy (幻想のＰａｒｉｓ, Gensō no Paris), a drama of romance and revenge set in the Parisian fashion industry where she co-starred with Kayo Matsuo. She also had a leading role in an episode of the long-running TV drama Kaseifu ha mita (家政婦は見た!) broadcast by TV-Asahi on December 4, 1997. Later, she was a regular on the NTV love story/suspense drama Tsumetai tsuki (冷たい月) which ran in 10 episodes from January to March 1998. In 2002, she had a voice role in the anime erotic-horror film Youjuu Kyoushitsu Chapter 2 (Demon Beast Invasion Chapter 2) with another former AV Idol, Riria Yoshikawa.

== Sources ==
- "Rui Sakuragi on IMdB". IMDb.
- "Rui Sakuragi on JMDB" (in Japanese).
- "Rui Sakuragi Interview" (in Japanese). Archived from the original on 2009-07-02.
