= Athena Eizou =

Japanese video production company

- Industry: Pornography
- Founded: 1981
- Headquarters: Tokyo, Japan
- Products: Adult Videos
- Website: http://www.athenaeizou.com/

Athena Eizou or Athena Eizō (アテナ映像, Atena Eizō) is an early pioneering Japanese adult video (AV) production company. They have offices in the Shibuya ward of Tokyo, Japan.

== Company information ==
Athena Eizou was founded December 21, 1981, by pink film director Tadashi Yoyogi and Hikaru Kitoh (鬼闘光). The VCR and home video market in Japan was still very small at this time and Yoyogi, who has been described as the "Father of Japanese Adult Video", had produced his first adult video just a month before. Japanese adult entertainment audiences, however, were already moving away from the theatrical pink film and Athena Eizou and Yoyogi proved successful. The company's first star was Kyōko Aizome, called the "first hard-core porn actress in Japan", who appeared in several early releases in the 1980s. In the next decade, "big-bust" actress Mariko Morikawa made her AV debut with Athena with the July 1994 release Tits Way Too Huge.

In 2010, the company, which is located in Tokyo's Shibuya ward, had a capital of 10 million Yen (about $100,000) and the CEO was 杉山英寛. Athena Eizou has operated a website Athena Online since April 2003 with an audience derived 84% from Japan and 12% from China. The website has videos available by mail order and by direct download, including a number of works from the early years of the company. The company produces about seven or eight new releases per month on DVD.

== Labels ==
The company has used the following labels for its videos:

- Athena (アテナ)
- Directors

== Directors ==
Several directors have worked with the company over the years:

- Tadashi Yoyogi (代々木忠)
- Hikaru Kitoh (鬼闘光)
- Mitchel (ミツル)
- Eitaro Onuma (大沼栄太郎)
- Katsuya Ichihara (市原克也)
- Takehiro Yasuda (安田健弘)

== Actresses ==
Some AV Idols who have appeared in Athena Eizou videos:

- Kyōko Aizome
- Eri Kikuchi
- Yumika Hayashi
- Mariko Morikawa
- Hitomi Shiraishi
- Aki Tomosaki
- Akira Watase

== Series ==
Some popular Athena series:

- Lewd Performance (いんらんパフォーマンス)
- Psycho Hypnotic Ecstasy (サイコ催眠エクスタシー)
- Secret Sexual Technique (性感極秘テクニック)
- The Interview (ザ・面接)
- Zubotsu Us! (おはズボッ!)
