= Tadashi Yoyogi =

Japanese film director

- Born: March 18, 1938 (age 88); Fukuoka Prefecture, Japan
- Occupation: Film director
- Years active: 1972 –
- Website: http://www.athenaeizou.com/athena_diary/

Tadashi Yoyogi (代々木忠, Yoyogi Tadashi) (born March 18, 1938)is a Japanese director of pink film and adult videos (AV). He is known as the "Father of Japanese Adult Video" and has been credited with establishing the model in his early work for many of the adult videos produced since.

== Life and career ==
Tadashi Yoyogi was born in Fukuoka Prefecture, Japan on March 18, 1938. For a time he was a manager of an ikebana flower-arranging shop but then joined the pink film company World Eiga in 1963. He started directing first for the small Prima Project (Purima Kikaku) company and then with Watanabe Pro from 1974. His first movie as a director was Memoirs of a Girl of Pleasure (ある少女の手記・快感) which appeared in 1972. Yoyogi and other young directors were able to bring a new direction to pink film and soon established themselves next to the veteran directors. The Japanese Movie Database entry for Yoyogi lists 9 films with Prima and another 26 with Watanabe Pro up to the beginning of 1981.

By 1980 in Japan, market penetration of the VCR was only about 1% and the market for home videos was small but growing and a number of companies started up about this time to take advantage of the new opportunities. Yoyogi directed his first adult video (AV) in November 1981 and soon afterwards founded his own company, Athena Eizou. That first video, April of Lust (淫欲のうずき, Inyoku no Uzuki), starred Kyōko Aizome, and it marked her debut in AV as well. Aizome and Yoyogi would go on to collaborate on a number of other softcore and hardcore projects in the next few years including the August 1982 theatrical film Karei Naru ai no Henreki Aizome Kyōko directed by Yoyogi for Joy Pack Film as well as the March 1983 Joy Pack release Kyōko Aizome's Somber Reminiscence.

Because the new medium of video was cheap and the equipment more portable, a new range of possibilities opened up to the AV director which Yoyogi was the first to take full advantage of. He began his popular AV series Document: The Onanie in 1982, shot in the pseudo-documentary style with an interview with the actress that would become a major component in many subsequent adult videos. The series used real sex and amateur performers to shed light on the "hidden sex life of Japan." When Onanie became a surprise success, investors started to move into the new media of adult video and a number of other companies were formed.

Yoyogi produced the first of his "Onanie" (masturbation) series of theatrical films with The Onanie for the Million Film studio in November 1982. This was followed in April 1983 by Orgasm: The Climax (ONANIE2 ザ・クライマックス) and then in July 1983 by the sequel The Document: Orgasms (ザ・ドキュメント オーガズム), both released by Joy Pack. The Weissers, in their book Japanese Cinema Encyclopedia: The Sex Films describe Orgasm: The Climax as depicting masturbation by a prostitute, a model, a TV personality and a transsexual, and ask "But can it really be called a movie?." In The Document: Orgasms, handheld camera technique is used to follow an extended S&M session designed to lead to "orgasmic delight". A later entry in the series was Onanie 3: The Vibe (ONANIE3ザ・バイブ) from Million in October 1984.

In the following years, Yoyogi directed a number of AV series for Athena Eizou including Secret Sexual Technique (性感極秘テクニック, Sekan Gokuhi Tekunikku), Psycho Hypnotic Ecstasy (サイコ催眠エクスタシー, Saiko Saimin Ekusutashii), Lewd Performance (いんらんパフォーマンス, Inran Pafōmansu), and especially his extended The Interview (ザ・面接, Za Mensetsu) series which was launched in 1993 and reached the 100th installment in December, 2008. Yoyogi has continued directing at Athena Eizou where he maintains a weekly diary and many of his early works are available for download. Volume 108 of his The Interview series was released in April 2010.

Yoyogi's activities have also attracted the attention of the world of academia. Masakazu Tanaka, professor and cultural anthropologist at Kyoto University gave a talk "Cult-Like Nature of the Activities of a Japanese Porn Director, Tadashi YOYOGI" before a panel at a conference on Gender and Spiritual Praxis in Asian Contexts, held in September 2006 at Lancaster University and in February 2007, Yoyogi was the subject of a study by Tanaka titled Spiritual Eroticism in the Early Works of a Japanese Porn Director, Tadashi Yoyogi (癒しとイヤラシのポルノグラフィー : 代々木忠監督作品をめぐって) published in the journal 人文學報 (Journal of Humanities).
