= 19th Yokohama Film Festival =

1998 film festival in Yokohama, Japan

- Location: Kannai Hall, Yokohama, Kanagawa, Japan
- Founded: 1980
- Festival date: 8 February 1998

The 19th Yokohama Film Festival (第19回ヨコハマ映画祭) was held on 8 February 1998 in Kannai Hall, Yokohama, Kanagawa, Japan.

== Awards ==
- Best Film: Onibi: The Fire Within
- Best Actor: Yoshio Harada – Onibi: The Fire Within
- Best Actress: Kyōka Suzuki – Welcome Back, Mr. McDonald
- Best Supporting Actor:
  - Masahiko Nishimura – Welcome Back, Mr. McDonald, Marutai no Onna
  - Isao Bitoh – Sharam Q no Enka no Hanamichi
- Best Supporting Actress: Reiko Kataoka – Onibi: The Fire Within
- Best Director: Rokurō Mochizuki – Onibi: The Fire Within, A Yakuza in Love
- Best New Director: Kōki Mitani – Welcome Back, Mr. McDonald
- Best Screenplay: Masato Harada – Bounce Ko Gals
- Best Cinematography: Yoshitaka Sakamoto – Bounce Ko Gals
- Best New Talent:
  - Ryōko Hirosue – 20th Century Nostalgia
  - Yukiko Okamoto – Bounce Ko Gals
  - Hitomi Satō – Bounce Ko Gals
  - Yasue Sato – Bounce Ko Gals
- Special Jury Prize: Sharam Q no Enka no Hanamichi

== Best 10 ==
1. Onibi: The Fire Within
2. Bounce Ko Gals
3. Kizu darake no Tenshi
4. Welcome Back, Mr. McDonald
5. Postman Blues
6. Yūkai
7. Sharam Q no Enka no Hanamichi
8. Tōkyō Biyori
9. My Secret Cache
10. Princess Mononoke

runner-up: Watashitachi ga Sukidatta Koto
