= Kanuma =

Kanuma may refer to:

- Kanuma, Tochigi, a city in Tochigi Prefecture, Japan
  - Kanuma Station, a railway station
- Eri Kanuma, Japanese actress Toshie Furuoya (born 1952)
- Naoki Kanuma (born 1997), Japanese footballer
- Kanuma, a brand name of the medication sebelipase alfa
