= Teruhiko Saigō =

Japanese singer and actor (1947–2022)

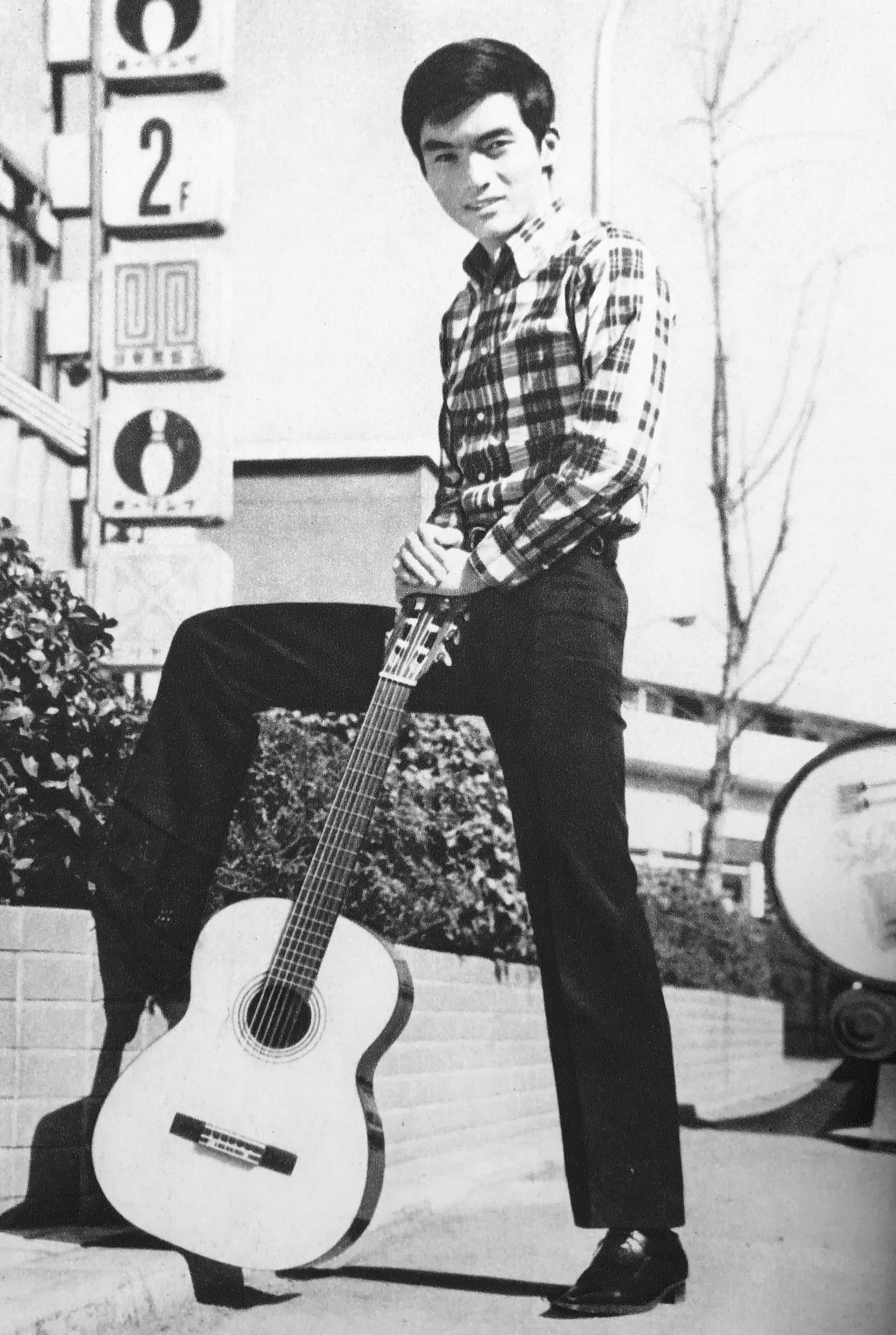
- Born: 5 February 1947; Kagoshima City, Kagoshima Prefecture, Allied-occupied Japan
- Died: 20 February 2022 (aged 75); Tokyo, Japan
- Occupations: Singer, actor
- Years active: 1964–2022
- Height: 1.76 m (5 ft 9 in)
- Spouse: Mari Henmi (m. 1972; div. 1981)
- Children: Emiri Henmi

Teruhiko Saigō (西郷 輝彦, Saigō Teruhiko; 5 February 1947 – 20 February 2022) was a Japanese singer and actor. As a singer, he was known as one of the three "Gosanke" (referring to gosanke, the three great Tokugawa houses), along with Yukio Hashi and Kazuo Funaki. The stage name was based on the Meiji Restoration one of three heroes, but also the Kagoshima Local hero Takamori Saigo.

== Career ==
Saigō made his debut in 1964 with the song "Kimi Dake o", for which he won a Japan Record Award for best new artist.

As an actor, he has portrayed people as varied as 20th century Prime Minister Kakuei Tanaka (in the 1983 film Shōsetsu Yoshida Gakkō) and 16th century samurai Katakura Kagetsuna (in the 1987 NHK Taiga drama Dokuganryū Masamune). A native of Kagoshima, he has played the roles of native sons such as Kuroda Kiyotaka and Saigō Tsugumichi, but his characters also include Tokugawa Ieyasu, Yagyū Jūbei and Hattori Hanzō. His roles in Chūshingura tales have included Mōri Koheita (1985).

Saigō has starred in various prime-time television series. These include Edo o Kiru, Genkurō Tabi Nikki Aoi no Abarenbō, Abare Hasshū Goyō Tabi, and Abare Isha Ranzan. NHK has tapped him for various Taiga drama roles as well. Among them are Mōri Hiromoto (in Mōri Motonari, 1997), Sanada Yukimura (Aoi Tokugawa Sandai, 2000), and Honda Masanobu (NHK's Taiga drama Musashi, 2003) in addition to Katakura Kagetsuna. Other NHK roles have included the contemporary daytime drama Niji no Sekkei (1964) and the uncle of the title character in the asadora Wakaba (2004–05).

On 21 February 2022, Sun Music, Saigo's management company, made an announcement that he died after a long battle with prostate cancer in Tokyo, on 20 February.

== Filmography ==
=== Films ===
- The Last Samurai (1974)
- The Fall of Ako Castle (1978) – Asano Takumi no Kami
- Shogun's Samurai (1978) – Tokugawa Tadanaga
- Shōsetsu Yoshida Gakkō (1983) – Kakuei Tanaka
- Gray Sunset (1985) – Haruo Takano
- Ruten no umi (1990)
- Listen to My Heart (2009) – Kengo Nakakura

=== Television ===
- Edo o Kiru (1975–81) – Tōyama Kagemoto
- Shadow Warriors (1980) – Tsutusmi Kyonosuke
- Hissatsu Masshigura! (1986)
- Dokuganryū Masamune (1987) – Katakura Kagetsuna
- Tabaruzaka (1987) – Saigō Jūdō
- Abare Hasshū Goyō Tabi (1990–94) – Tōdō Heihachirō
- Mōri Motonari (1997) – Mōri Hiromoto
- Aoi (2000) – Sanada Yukimura
- Musashi (NHK, 2003) – Honda Masanobu
- Bar Lemon Heart (2016) – Shingo Makita
- No Side Manager (2019) – Hiroshi Shimamoto
- The Yagyu Conspiracy (2020) – Narrator
