= Tatsuya Nagatomo =

Japanese actor and voice actor

Tatsuya Nagatomo (長友 達也, Nagatomo Tatsuya; born December 27, 1953) is a Japanese actor and voice actor affiliated with Office Osawa. He is originally from Nagasaki Prefecture.

== Live appearances ==
- Goodbye Boy
- Matasaburo-kun no Koto: Bokura no Jidai
- Beautiful Mystery

== Voice roles ==
=== Video games ===
- Valkyrie Profile (Grey, Gabriel Celesta)

=== Dubbing ===
- Fraggle Rock (Uncle Travelling Matt, Pa Gorg)
- The Lion King (Young Simba)
