= Yokohama BJ Blues =

- Film poster
- Directed by: Eiichi Kudo
- Screenplay by: Shōichi Maruyama
- Story by: Yūsaku Matsuda
- Produced by: Mitsuru Kurosawa; Yutaka Okada
- Starring: Yūsaku Matsuda; Mari Henmi; Keizō Kanie; Toby Kadoguchi; Haruko Mabuchi
- Cinematography: Seizō Sengen
- Edited by: Osamu Tanaka
- Music by: Creation
- Production company: Toei Central Film
- Distributed by: Toei Company
- Release date: April 25, 1981 (Japan)
- Running time: 112 minutes
- Country: Japan
- Language: Japanese

Yokohama BJ Blues (Japanese: ヨコハマＢＪブルース, Hepburn: Yokohama BJ burûsu) is a 1981 Japanese neo-noir mystery crime thriller film directed by Eiichi Kudo and written by Shōichi Maruyama, based on an idea by Yūsaku Matsuda. It is a loose remake of The Long Goodbye (1973), while also incorporating elements of Luchino Visconti's Death in Venice (1971) and William Friedkin's Cruising (1980). The film tells the story of a blues singer moonlighting as a private detective who is accused of murder and must clear his name. Yūsaku Matsuda stars in the lead role, in addition to Mari Henmi, Keizō Kanie, Toby Kadoguchi and Haruko Mabuchi. Japanese rock band Creation composed the film's soundtrack, with several of its songs performed by Matsuda. Yokohama BJ Blues was theatrically released by Toei Company on April 25, 1981, in Japan.

== Premise ==
BJ, who lives in Yokohama, is a small-time blues singer who performs at shabby bars every night. He can't make a living through singing alone, so he earns some extra change with a side job as a private detective. One day, BJ is asked to investigate the whereabouts of a missing boy named Akira. While investigating, BJ's best friend is killed right in front of him. BJ is accused of the murder and sets out to clear his name. As he uncovers a conspiracy of corrupt cops and gangsters, his investigation takes him through Yokohama's underground gay and biker scenes and even implicates his own past.

== Cast ==
- Yūsaku Matsuda as BJ
- Mari Henmi as Tamiko
- Keizō Kanie as Tetsuo
- Toby Kadoguchi as Chink
- Haruko Mabuchi as Kozue
- Koji Tanaka as Akira Kondo
- Tatsuo Yamada as Yoshio
- Eri Kanuma as Midori Hayashi
- Rei Okamoto as Kazumi Hinata
- Rikiya Yasuoka as Yasunaga
- Yuya Uchida as Keisuke
- Ryudo Uzaki as Jojo
- Ichirō Zaitsu as Ushitakuma
- Hiroshi Shimizu as Koshikawa
- Taiji Tonoyama as Isao Hori
- Michihiro Yamanishi as Satoshi
- Toshio Tomogane as Kinoshita
- Rebun Hori as Tori
- Yuji Yoshikawa
- Jugatsu Toi
- Mitsutaka Tachikawa
- Satoshi Sadanaga
- Takaharu Kasano
- Osamu Shigematsu
- Hiroshi Yamashita
- Takashi Toomizu
- Kōen Okumura
- Hyōe Enoki
- Yukiko Tachibana
- Hiroko Nishimura
- Masumi Sekiguchi
- Keiko Kudo

== Background ==
Matsuda had wanted to make a film with director Kudo for several years. Yokohama BJ Blues was a departure for both of them, marking a shift towards more dramatic fare for Matsuda, while allowing Kudo to work outside the samurai genre for which he was well known at the time. It was shot entirely on location in Yokohama.

Yokohama BJ Blues was produced by Toei Central Film, a subsidiary of Toei focused on making program pictures for the company's smaller theaters. Most of its productions were pink films and imported features, though they also funded smaller domestic productions, typically shot in a few weeks on budgets of less than ¥30 million.

Screenwriter Maruyama had worked with Matsuda on several previous projects. Matsuda approached him with the story idea after watching the American film Cruising. Maruyama suggested Yokohama as the setting due to its crime problem, as well as the city's multicultural identity, which would allow for a diverse cast of characters. He later stated that his screenplay was also influenced by The Long Goodbye, particularly its plot structure and the character of Philip Marlowe. In addition, Maruyama said that traveling was a key motif in the film.

== Soundtrack ==
The film's soundtrack was composed by Japanese rock band Creation. Matsuda, who himself was a blues singer with several albums to his name, performed four songs on the soundtrack: "Gray Town" (灰色の街), "Brother's Song" (ブラザーズ・ソング), "Yokohama Honky Tonk Blues", and "Mary's Lullaby" (マリーズ・ララバイ). He also wrote the lyrics for "Gray Town", while Tatsuya Fuji wrote the lyrics of "Yokohama Honky Tonk Blues". "Brother's Song" served as the film's theme song. Three of these tracks ("Gray Town", "Brother's Song" and "Mary's Lullaby") were included on Matsuda's album Hardest Day, which was released on April 21, 1981, four days ahead of the film's premiere. Matsuda used a shot from the film as the album cover. The renditions of these songs onscreen included Creation as Matsuda's backing band.

== Release ==
Yokohama BJ Blues was theatrically released by Toei Company on April 25, 1981, in Japan. Its box office returns were modest. The film was later released to DVD by Toei Video on November 21, 2005.

On December 16, 2024, Radiance Films released Yokohama BJ Blues on Blu-ray. Limited to 3000 copies, it included several special features, such as interviews with Mari Henmi and Shōichi Maruyama, a location guide by Toru Sano, the original theatrical trailer, a reversible sleeve, and a booklet with an essay by Dimitri Ianni and Satoshi Takahashi's 1981 review of the film for Kinema Junpo (translated by Tom Mes).

== Reception ==
Writing for The Digital Bits, Stuart Galbraith IV called the film, "Self-consciously arty". He also said it "undeniably has an interesting look, but the script seems to deliberately leave out huge swaths of exposition, leaving the hapless viewer to try and figure out what's going on." Nonetheless, he concluded that Kudo's film is "an offbeat, interesting release in other respects and worth seeing once."

Andrew Kotwicki of Spoiler Free Movie Sleuth said that Yokohama BJ Blues is "clearly an actor's film", and that "the whole endeavor [has] a bluesy, melancholic vibe that meshes very well with the crusty blue grainy cinematography." He also thought that the film represented "Matsuda’s most personal expression."

For Geek Vibes Nation, Dillon Gonzales praised the HD transfer of the Radiance Films release, though he reserved some criticism for the visual fidelity of background details. He called the film itself a "dreamy mystery" and stated that, though he found certain plot details to be convoluted, "the film sets itself apart by tackling some material that would typically never be found near the genre of old."

In his review for Cinematic Panic, Fabian Bullitt concluded that the film is "a perfectly executed néo-noir that found its uniqueness in its dark early 1980s Japanese urban aesthetic." He also described it as "The kind of movie that leaves you feeling melancholic."

Tyler Foster of Genre Grinder believed that, in his evocation of The Long Goodbye, "Kudo cared more about the Altman part than the detective part." He praised the film's atmosphere and Matsuda's performance, but also called the plot "incomprehensible" and stated that its conclusion was "inscrutable." He concluded that the film was not character driven so much as "vibe driven."

A review for Fiction Machine said that Kudo "soaks Altman’s version in a greasy patina of Yakuza criminal sleaze." It also stated that the film's "steely blues" predated similar visual aesthetics in films by James Cameron and Kathryn Bigelow.
