= Yoshihiko Matsui =

Japanese filmmaker (born 1956)

- Born: May 6, 1956; Nishinomiya, Hyogo, Japan
- Occupation: Film director
- Website: https://web.archive.org/web/20110728144126/http://www.aa.alpha-net.ne.jp/cineymbw/

Yoshihiko Matsui (松井良彦, Matsui Yoshihiko, born May 6, 1956) is a Japanese filmmaker.

== Filmography ==
=== Director ===
- 1979 Rusty Empty Can (錆びた缶空, Sabita Kankara)
- 1981 Pig-Chicken Suicide (豚鶏心中, Tonkeishinju)
- 1988 The Noisy Requiem (追悼のざわめき, Tsuitō no Zawameki)
- 2007 Where Are We Going? (どこに行くの, Doko ni Iku no?)

=== Editor ===
- 1980 Crazy Thunder Road (狂い咲きサンダーロード, Kuruizaki Sandā Rōdo) (co-editor with Sōgo Ishii)
