= Crazy Thunder Road =

- Promotional release poster
- Directed by: Gakuryū Ishii
- Written by: Mitsuhiko Akita; Masumi Hirayanagi; Gakuryū Ishii
- Produced by: Mitsuhiko Akita; Hiroshi Kobayashi
- Starring: Tatsuo Yamada; Nenji Kobayashi
- Cinematography: Norimichi Kasamatsu
- Edited by: Gakuryū Ishii; Yoshihiko Matsui
- Music by: Shigeru Izumiya; Panta & Hal; The Mods
- Distributed by: Toei Central Film
- Release date: 24 May 1980 (Japan)
- Running time: 98 minutes
- Country: Japan
- Language: Japanese

Crazy Thunder Road (Japanese: 狂い咲きサンダーロード, Hepburn: Kuruizaki Sandā Rōdo) is a 1980 Japanese punk-action-biker film written and directed by Gakuryū Ishii. Ishii made the film as his graduation project whilst studying at Nihon University and was subsequently distributed by Toei Studios.

== Cast ==
- Tatsuo Yamada as Jin
- Hiroshi Kaiya as Tadashi
- Masamitsu Daichi as Yukio
- Yōsuke Nakajima as Eiji
- Tadashi Kamiya as Kume
- Akihiro Kimura as Ujioka
- Hiroyuki Kiyosue as Nakamura
- Katsunori Hirose as Koguma
- Masahiro Ōzeki as Terayama
- Nenji Kobayashi as Tsuyoshi
- Masashi Kojima as Shigeru
- Koji Nanjō as Ken
- Michiko Kitahara as Noriko
- Naoto Ōmori as Kotarō
- Masahiro Yoshiwara as Ossan
- Akemi Morimura as Jin's girlfriend
