= 5th Japan Film Professional Awards =

Japanese film awards in 1996

- Date: April 26, 1996
- Site: Theatre Shinjuku, Tokyo, Japan

The 5th Japan Film Professional Awards (第5回日本映画プロフェッショナル大賞) is the 5th edition of the Japan Film Professional Awards. It awarded the best of 1995 in film. The ceremony took place on April 26, 1996, at Theatre Shinjuku in Tokyo.

== Awards ==
- Best Film: Another Lonely Hitman
- Best Director: Rokurō Mochizuki (Another Lonely Hitman, Kitanai Yatsu)
- Best Actress: Yuki Uchida (Hana Yori Dango)
- Best Actor: Ryo Ishibashi (Another Lonely Hitman)
- Best New Encouragement: Mikio Osawa (The Boy Made in Japan)
- Best New Encouragement: Kaori Shimada (The Boy Made in Japan)
- Best New Encouragement: Kimika Yoshino (Eko Eko Azarak)
- Best New Director: Shiori Kazama (Fuyu no Kappa)
- Special: Kokuei (For years of pink film production.)

== 10 best films ==
1. Another Lonely Hitman (Rokurō Mochizuki)
2. Gonin (Takashi Ishii)
3. Eko Eko Azarak (Shimako Satō)
4. Berlin (Gō Rijū)
5. The Boy Made in Japan (Ataru Oikawa)
6. Toire no Hanako-san (Joji Matsuoka)
7. Endless Waltz (Kōji Wakamatsu)
8. Burai Heiya (Teruo Ishii)
9. Score (Atsushi Muroga)
10. Getting Any? (Takeshi Kitano)
