= Another Lonely Hitman =

- Film poster
- Directed by: Rokurō Mochizuki
- Screenplay by: Toshiyuki Morioka
- Based on: A novel by Yukio Yamanouchi
- Produced by: Hiroshi Yamaji
- Starring: Ryo Ishibashi; Asami Sawaki; Kazuhiko Kanayama; Tatsuo Yamada; Tetsuya Yūki
- Cinematography: Naoaki Imaizumi
- Edited by: Jōji Shimaki
- Music by: Kazutoki Umezu
- Production company: Tokuma Japan Communications
- Release date: July 1, 1995 (Japan)
- Running time: 105 minutes
- Country: Japan
- Language: Japanese

Another Lonely Hitman (Japanese: 新・悲しきヒットマン, Hepburn: Shin kanashiki hittoman) is a 1995 Japanese yakuza film directed by Rokurō Mochizuki and starring Ryo Ishibashi and Asami Sawaki (the latter of whom made her feature film debut in the production). The film was based on a novel by Yukio Yamanouchi, who also appears as an actor in the film. The Japanese title of the film begins with the character 新, shin (new), to distinguish this movie from a 1989 film 悲しきヒットマン (Lonely Hitman or Sad Hitman), also based on a novel by Yamanouchi but unrelated in plot.

== Plot ==
After 10 years in prison, yakuza hitman Takashi Tachibana is returning to a new mob scene where his code of honor is outdated. The old violent gangs have now turned to drug dealing as their main business. His old mob presents him with a bundle of cash and Yuki, a call girl who is addicted to drugs as he once was. Tachibana falls for the girl and tries to rehabilitate her which eventually causes trouble with his own gang and rivals as well.

== Cast ==
- Ryo Ishibashi as Takashi Tachibana
- Asami Sawaki as Yuki Tajima
- Kazuhiko Kanayama as Yuji Takayama
- Tatsuo Yamada as Shimoyama
- Tetsuya Yūki as Hirakawa
- Zenkichi Yoneyama as Wada
- Toshiyuki Kitami as Mizohashi
- Yukio Yamanouchi as Yoshimura

== Release ==
The film was released theatrically in Japan on July 1, 1995. A DVD version with English subtitles which included an interview with director Mochizuki came out May 31, 2005.

== Reception ==
At the 5th Japan Film Professional Awards, Another Lonely Hitman won the award for Best Film of 1995 and Rokurō Mochizuki was named Best Director. Ryo Ishibashi took the Best Actor award at the same ceremony.
