= Sharam Q no Enka no Hanamichi =

- Theatrical release poster
- Directed by: Yojiro Takita
- Screenplay by: Hiroshi Saito; Masashi Todayama
- Produced by: Akitoshi Takuma; Hisao Kobayashi; [Toru Miyazawa
- Starring: Sharan Q; Asaka Seto; Takanori Jinai
- Cinematography: Naoki Kashiwano
- Music by: Sharan Q; Kenaku Tanigawa
- Production company: Fuji Television
- Distributed by: Toho
- Release date: 30 August 1997 (Japan)
- Running time: 92 minutes
- Country: Japan

Sharam Q no Enka no Hanamichi (Japanese: シャ乱Ｑの演歌の花道; lit. Sharam Q's Enka Flower Path) is a 1997 Japanese comedy film directed by Yōjirō Takita and starring the rock band Sharam Q. It was released on 30 August 1997.

== Cast ==
- Tsunku as Rannosuke Amakusa
- Hatake as Haruo
- Takanori Jinnai as Hideto Kuroi
- Asaka Seto as Tamami Naruto
- Isao Bitō as Ichiro Misaki
- Masako Motoi as President Koike
- Takashi Matsuo as Manager
- Chisato Moritaka as Herself
- Ken Takayama as Himself
- Seiko Mineko as Seiko Matsuda
- Shu as Ryo
- Makoto as Masato
- Taisei as Hanyu
- Kenji Kawabata as Ana Kawabata
- Rika Sato as Ana Sato
- Miki Tominaga as New Singer
- Mikijirō Hira as Daisuke Naruto

== Release ==
Sharam Q no Enka no Hanamichi was distributed theatrically in Japan by Toho on August 30, 1997.

== Reception ==
The film was chosen as the seventh best film at the 19th Yokohama Film Festival.

Award	Date	Category	Recipients and nominees	Result
Yokohama Film Festival	8 February 1998	Best Supporting Actor	Isao Bitō	Won
Yokohama Film Festival	8 February 1998	Special Jury Prize	SharaM Q no Enka no Hanamichi	Won
