= Mari Henmi =

Japanese singer, tarento, and actress (born 1950)

- Born: October 5, 1950 (age 76); Zushi, Kanagawa, Japan
- Occupations: Singer, actress
- Spouse: Teruhiko Saigō

Mari Henmi (辺見 マリ, Henmi Mari; born October 5, 1950) is a Japanese singer, tarento, and actress. She was born in Zushi, Kanagawa and raised in Kyōto.

== Career ==
She made her debut in November 1969 with "Daniel, mon amour" (a song in the style of Birkin and Gainsbourg's "Je T'aime Moi Non Plus", which had been released in February of that year). At age 20, she became famous for the song "Keiken" (experience), and for her singing style which is mixed with sighing. Followed by releases of titles such as Shiseikatsu and Memai, she was soon recognized as a 'sexy' pop singer.

However, in 1972 at the peak of her popularity, she married popular singer Teruhiko Saigō and suddenly retired. As a mother of two children, in 1981 she divorced Saigō and returned to the entertainment world. Following this, she was in the tabloids due to a fuss over her financial troubles and production of a nude photo book.

With the release of the CD Good-Bye Abayo in 1998, her daughter Emiri Henmi makes headlines for managing the photography of the CD. In addition to being a singer and TV tarento, she is also active on stage in musicals.

== Family ==
Her son is musician Noritaka Henmi; her daughter is Emiri Henmi. Actor Matsuda Kenji is her son-in-law.

== Filmography ==
=== Film ===
- Yokohama BJ Blues (1981, Toei Company)

=== Television ===
- Doyō supesharu (TV Tōkyō)
- Kaiketsu Emichaneru (Kansai TV)

=== Kōhaku Uta Gassen appearances ===
| Year | # | Song | No. | VS |
|---|---|---|---|---|
| 1970 (Showa 45)/21st | 1 | Shiseikatsu (私生活) | 15/24 | Frank Nagai |

=== Radio ===
- Kayō sukuranburu (Guest. NHK-FM, March 31, 2007)
