= Beautiful Mystery =

1983 film by Genji Nakamura

- Japanese theatrical poster
- Japanese: 巨根伝説 美しき謎
- Directed by: Genji Nakamura.
- Screenplay by: Rokurō Mochizuki
- Starring: Tatsuya Nagatomo; Kei Shiyuto; Akira Yamashina; Ren Osugi
- Cinematography: Hideo Ito
- Edited by: Makoto Sawada
- Music by: Pink Box
- Production companies: ENK; YU
- Release date: 1983
- Running time: 61 minutes
- Language: Japanese

Beautiful Mystery (Japanese: 巨根伝説 美しき謎, Hepburn: Kyokon Densetsu: Utsukushiki Nazo; lit. "Legend of the Giant Cock: The Beautiful Mystery") is a 1983 Japanese pink film (softcore pornographic film) directed by Genji Nakamura and written by Rokurō Mochizuki. A satire of the life of Japanese author and nationalist Yukio Mishima, the film was one of the earliest commercially produced gay pornographic films in Japan.

== Synopsis ==
First-year university student Shinohara Itsuro joins an all-male nationalist paramilitary society overseen by Mitani Makio, an intellectual and poet. Mitani seeks to launch a coup d'état against the Japanese government, and intends to die by ritual seppuku if the coup is unsuccessful. Upon being initiated into the society, Shinohara is assigned fellow recruit Takizawa to be his senpai; the two have sex after a night of heavy drinking, and become lovers shortly thereafter. Such encounters are a common occurrence within the ranks of the society, with training camp exercises and a rehearsal of Mitani's death by seppuku both progressing into orgies among Mitani and the recruits. The night before the coup, Mitani instructs Shinohara and Takizawa to return home to be with each other one final time. After a night of vigorous intercourse, the couple awaken only to discover that they have overslept and missed the coup. Two years later, Shinohara and Takizawa have become crossdressers at a gay bar.

== Cast ==
- Tatsuya Nagatomo
- Kei Shiyuto
- Akira Yamashina
- Ren Osugi

== Production and release ==
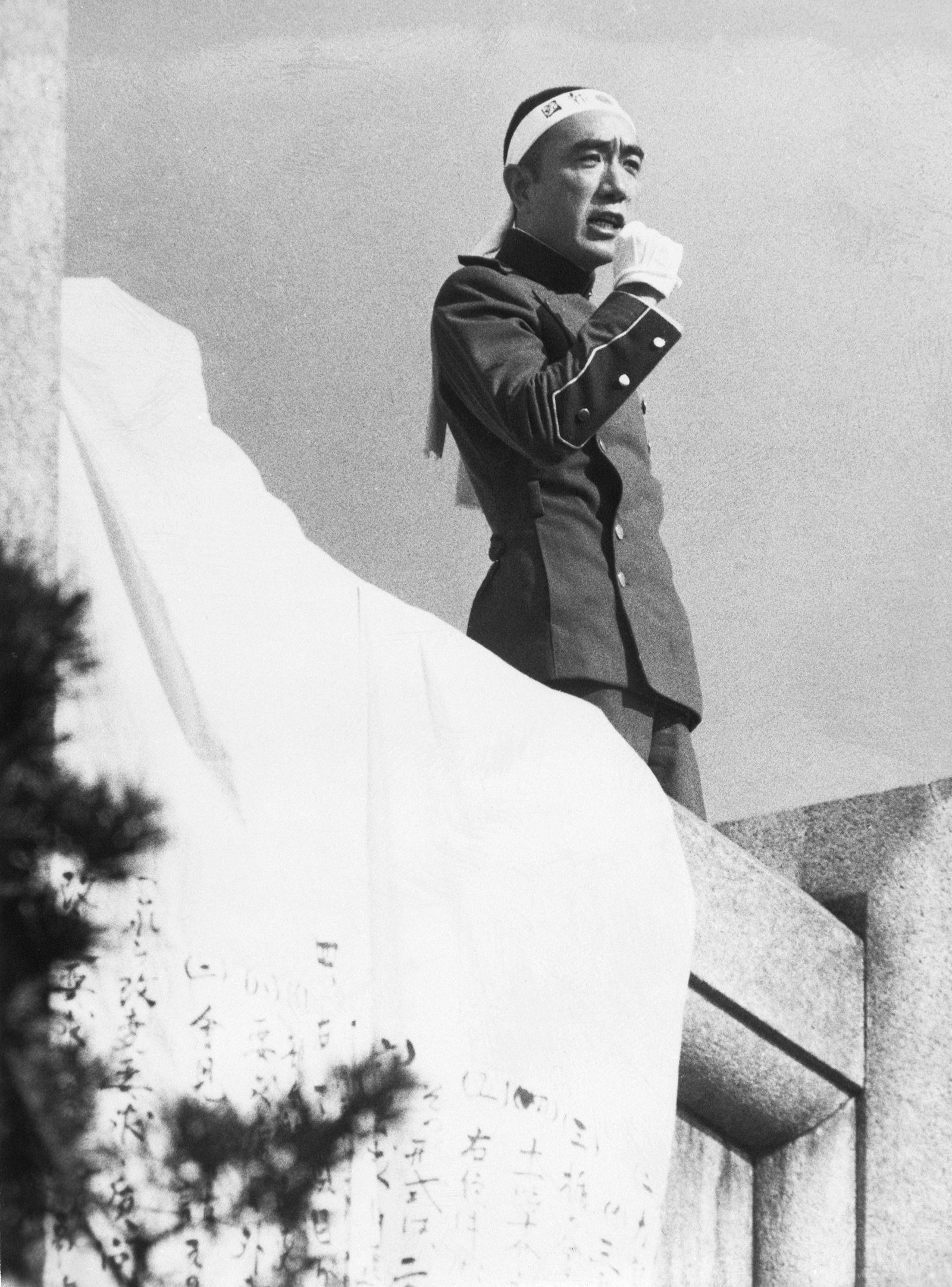
The film satirizes the life and politics of author and nationalist Yukio Mishima (pictured).

The film was directed by Genji Nakamura and written by Rokurō Mochizuki, with cinematography by Hideo Ito, editing by Makoto Sawada, and music by Pink Box. The film was released direct to adult theaters in Japan in 1983, and was one of the earliest commercially produced gay pornographic films in Japan. In North America, an English-language subtitled version of the film was released by distributor Water Bearer Films in 1993.

Beautiful Mystery is a pink film, a genre of Japanese softcore pornographic films that often include exploitation and experimental elements. The film is a satire of Japanese author and nationalist Yukio Mishima and his private militia the Tatenokai, who in 1970 launched a failed coup attempt which ended in Mishima's death by seppuku. The fictionalized society's focus on physical fitness in particular echoes Sun and Steel, Mishima's 1968 essay on bodybuilding and martial arts.

== Reception ==
Reviewing the film for Variety, critic Dennis Harvey commended the film's performances and script as functioning "on more than a purely titillating plane", but criticized its "too-farcical" ending scene. Gavin Walker of the socialist magazine Jacobin called the film "perhaps the greatest critical response" to both "Mishima's own work and to the portentous unintentional comedy that runs through far-right appropriations of Mishima". Time Out praised the film as "ribald" and "highly entertaining", noting that it is "amazing that [the film] was made at a time when discussion of Mishima's sexuality was a virtual taboo in Japan".
