= Himitsu Sentai Gorenger =

Japanese tokusatsu superhero television series

- Title screen
- Genre: Tokusatsu; Superhero fiction; Spy-fi
- Created by: Shotaro Ishinomori
- Written by: Shōzō Uehara
- Directed by: Minoru Yamada; Katsuhiko Taguchi; Koichi Takemoto; Itaru Orita; Hidetoshi Kitamura; Michio Konishi
- Starring: Naoya Makoto; Hiroshi Miyauchi; Baku Hatakeyama; Jirō Daruma; Lisa Komaki; Yukio Itō; Eri Kanuma; Nobuo Yana; Toshio Takahara
- Narrated by: Nobuo Tanaka; Tōru Ōhira
- Music by: Chumei Watanabe
- Opening theme: "Susume! Gorenger" by Isao Sasaki, Mitsuko Horie, & Columbia Yurikago Kai
- Ending theme: "Himitsu Sentai Gorenger" by Isao Sasaki & Koorogi '73; "Mi yo!! Gorenger" by Isao Sasaki, Koorogi '73, & Wilbees
- Country of origin: Japan
- No. of episodes: 84

Production
- Producers: Takashi Ogino (NET); Tōru Hirayama (Toei); Susumu Yoshikawa (Toei); Michinao Fukazawa (Toei)
- Running time: 30 minutes
- Production companies: NET; Toei Company

Original release
- Network: ANN (NET)
- Release: April 5, 1975 – March 26, 1977

Related
- J.A.K.Q. Dengekitai

Himitsu Sentai Gorenger (秘密戦隊ゴレンジャー, Himitsu Sentai Gorenjā; Secret Squadron Gorenger) is a Japanese television tokusatsu series broadcast by NET. The series is the first installment of Super Sentai. Directed by Minoru Yamada, Katsuhiko Taguchi, Koichi Takemoto, Itaru Orita, Hidetoshi Kitamura and Michio Konishi, it stars Naoya Makoto, Hiroshi Miyauchi, Baku Hatakeyama, Jirō Daruma, Lisa Komaki, Yukio Itō, Eri Kanuma, Nobuo Yana and Toshio Takahara. It aired from April 5, 1975, to March 26, 1977, and was replaced by J.A.K.Q. Dengekitai. Toei distributes the series internationally under the title Five Rangers. The series was released in the Philippines under the title Star Rangers.

== Plot ==
When world peace is threatened by the emergence of a terrorist group called the Black Cross Army, EAGLE (The Earth Guard League) is formed to combat the threat. The Black Cross Army sends five operatives to destroy each EAGLE branch in Japan, killing all but five members. These surviving members are summoned to a secret base located underneath the snack shop "Gon", where they are recruited by EAGLE Japan's commander, Gonpachi Edogawa. They become the Himitsu Sentai Gorengers and are given electronic battlesuits that endow them with superhuman strength and speed. The five dedicate themselves to stopping the Black Cross Army and its leader, the Black Cross Führer.

== Characters ==
=== Gorengers ===
- Tsuyoshi Kaijo (海城 剛, Kaijō Tsuyoshi): The 24-year-old younger brother of the Kantō EAGLE base captain, Tsuyoshi and his teammates were playing soccer when the Black Cross Army launched the attack that killed his brother. Tsuyoshi is trained in combat planning and strategy. As the red-colored Akarenger (アカレンジャー, Akarenjā), he is the team leader and coordinates group attacks such as the Gorenger Storm (ゴレンジャーストーム, Gorenjā Sutōmu) or Gorenger Hurricane (ゴレンジャーハリケーン, Gorenjā Harikēn). He wields the Red Vute (レッドビュート, Reddo Byūto), a multipurpose whip that can transform into other weapons such as the Spear Vute (ヤリビュート, Yari Byūto) or the Drill Vute (ドリルビュート, Doriru Byūto). He also carries the Silver Shot (シルバーショット, Shirubā Shotto) tranquilizer gun. Tsuyoshi appeared in the final episode of Kaizoku Sentai Gokaiger, receiving his powers back in the form of the Akarenger Key as the Gokaigers left Earth.
- Akira Shinmei (新命 明, Shinmei Akira): The oldest member of the Gorengers at 25-years-old, Akira was training in the snowy region of Tōhoku when the Black Cross Army attacked. He is a marksmanship instructor, skilled in archery and piloting. He wants to become a racing driver. As the blue-colored Aorenger (アオレンジャー, Aorenjā), he is the second-in-command. He pilots the Variblune, and later the Varidorin. He wields the Bluechery (ブルーチェリー, Burūcherī), and later the Ultra Bluechery (ウルトラブルーチェリー, Urutora Burūcherī), a bow that can fire specially designed arrows known as Blue Arrows and Blue Arrow Rockets.
- Kirenger (キレンジャー, Kirenjā): The yellow-colored member of the Gorengers who wields the Ki Sticker (キーステッカー, Kī Sutekkā), a polearm whose head can be outfitted with various attachments such as a punching fist, and the YTC (YTC, Wai Tī Shī; Yellow Transceiver), a radio that can jam electronic circuitry. The moniker of Kirenger was utilized by its original user and his temporary successor.
  - Daita Oiwa (大岩 大太, Ōiwa Daita; 1–54, 67–84): Daita, nicknamed "Dai-chan" by Akira, Peggy, and Yoko, is a 23-year-old jovial engineering recruit at EAGLE's Kyushu branch who was training with his comrades when the Black Cross Army attacked. Adept in mechanics and mathematics, he has difficulty solving simple word puzzles and riddles. As a judo champion, Daita is physically strong. Daita was later promoted to Chief of EAGLE's Kyushu branch but soon returned to active duty with the Gorengers after his replacement is killed by the Black Cross Army.
  - Daigoro Kumano (熊野 大五郎, Kumano Daigorō; 55–67): Daigoro replaced Daita after the latter became the commander of the Kyushu branch for a time. He was killed by a flying blade from Can Opener Mask.
- Peggy Matsuyama (ペギー松山, Pegī Matsuyama): The 18-year-old Peggy worked at EAGLE's Hokkaido branch as a chemical analyst and weapons engineer specializing in explosives. Fashion-conscious, Peggy often wears go-go boots and short hip-hugging hot pants. As the pink-colored Momorenger (モモレンジャー, Momorenjā), she wields the Momo Mirror (モモミラー, Momo Mirā), a jamming device that can confuse and confound her opponents. She also carries the Momo Card (モモカード, Momo Kādo) throwing shuriken and the high impact Earring Bombs (ピアス爆弾, Piasu Bakudan).
- Kenji Asuka (明日香 健二, Asuka Kenji): The youngest member of the Gorengers at 17-years-old, Kenji was tending to pigeons on a rooftop at EAGLE's Kansai branch when the Black Cross Army attacked, thus saving him from the poison gas used in the attack. He has a happy-go-lucky temperament. As the green-colored Midorenger (ミドレンジャー, Midorenjā), he wields the Midomerang (ミドメラン, Midomeran), a razor-sharp boomerang that can be either flung at his opponents or used as a handheld weapon for cutting and slashing. He also carries the Mido Puncher (ミドパンチャー, Mido Panchā), a slingshot that can be used to fire pachinko pellets and explosives.

=== Other EAGLE characters ===
- Gonpachi Edogawa (江戸川 権八, Edogawa Gonpachi): Commander of EAGLE. When operating in public, Gonpachi disguises himself as the cook at the snack shop Gon (ゴン), which is the secret entrance to the Gorengers' headquarters. The shop later becomes the fruit parlor Gon.
- EAGLE Agents (イーグル連絡員, Īguru Renrakuin): A trio of secretaries and secret agents who assists Commander Edogawa: Yoko Kato (加藤 陽子, Katō Yōko) (a.k.a. Agent 007), Tomoko Hayashi (林 友子, Hayashi Tomoko) (a.k.a. Agent 008), and Haruko Nakamura (中村 春子, Nakamura Haruko) (a.k.a. Agent 009). They primarily act behind the scenes, but occasionally help the Gorengers in the field.

=== Black Cross Army ===
The Black Cross Army (黒十字軍, Kuro Jūjigun) is a terrorist group led by the Black Cross Führer whose goal is the eradication of the human race and the absolute domination of the world. They use advanced technology and magic to create an army of superhuman operatives to attack EAGLE and the Gorengers. Most of the Black Cross operatives are humans who have been enhanced through surgery. They had various secret bases across the globe. The main headquarters is the flying Black Cross Castle (黒十字城, Kuro Jūjijō).

- Black Cross Führer (黒十字総統, Kuro Jūji Sōtō): The leader of the Black Cross Army, often referred to as the "Machine Monster", and a highly intelligent being with supernatural powers who hides his identity even from his generals, occasionally disguising himself as a human. He is eventually revealed as the Black Cross Castle itself, controlled by a sentient alien AI, and defeated by the Gorengers' Five-Star Cassiopea Attack.
- Sun Mask (日輪仮面, Nichirin Kamen): The so-called "Star of Africa" (アフリカの星, Afurika no Hoshi) who wears a sun mask. A ruthless tyrant renowned for his successive victories in Africa, he is called to Japan to eliminate the Gorengers, but his plans are frequently hampered by his own cowardice.
- Iron Man Mask General Temujin (鉄人仮面テムジン将軍, Tetsujin Kamen Temujin Shōgun): The so-called "Mongol Demon" (モンゴルの鬼, Mongoru no Oni). A cold and sadistic, yet overly prideful recruit from the Black Cross Army's Gobi Desert operations, he is a master tactician who leads his own army in the Steel Brigade (鋼鉄軍団, Kōtetsu Gundan).
- Volcano Mask General Magman (火の山仮面マグマン将軍, Hinoyama Kamen Maguman Shōgun): Hailing from the Eldgjá region in Iceland, he is the volcano-masked leader of the Eruption Battalion (噴火軍団, Funka Gundan) and commander of his own mobile battle station, the Moving Fortress Navarone (移動要塞ナバローン, Idō Yōsai Nabarōn). He is able to fire napalm missiles from the top of his mask, and is impervious to the Gorengers' weapons.
- Commander-in-Chief Golden Mask (ゴールデン仮面大将軍, Gōruden Kamen Daishōgun): Black Cross Army's top general, a supernatural Great Sphinx of Giza-masked entity awoken through black magic and the Black Cross Führer's powers. A well-versed sorcerer with an interest in astrology, Golden Mask takes command of Black Cross Army's elite Africa Troopers (アフリカ軍団, Afurika Gundan). He can repel most of the Gorengers' attacks.
- Steel Sword Dragon (鋼鉄剣竜, Kōtetsu Kenryū; Movie): A rogue dragon-themed Black Cross Army operative who was imprisoned for reckless and rebellious behavior, but later freed by Black Cross Führer in exchange for his help in destroying the Gorengers. He is a strong and highly-resistant fighter wielding a dao that can break almost any object.
- Zolders (ゾルダー, Zorudā): The Black Cross Army's faceless leather-suited foot soldiers, altered with enhanced strength and speed and brainwashed to be absolutely loyal. They carry a variety of weapons including machine guns, bazookas, and iron swords. Specialized divisions include the Black Cross Camouflaged Ninja (黒十字忍団, Kuro Jūji Nindan) and a squad of mystics who served Black Cross Führer. The Zolders pilot air fighters called Condolers (コンドラー, Kondorā) (small) and Battlers (バットラー, Battorā) (large). They shout "Hoi" when attacking their victims.

==== Masked Monsters ====
The Masked Monsters (仮面怪人, Kamen Kaijin) are the Black Cross Army's field agents, who cause chaos and disorder wherever they go. They are mainly androids with strange masks that represent their ability and skills in the field, with the ability to continuously upgrade themselves through the continued research and developments of the Black Cross Army. These humanoids can have abilities to change into other objects to help with infiltration or investigations or to assist in their chaos-causing objectives.

- Golden Mask (黄金仮面, Ōgon Kamen; 1): A gold masked Grim Reaper-like Masked Monster. He can mentally manipulate his grim-reaper looking scythe to attack.
- Samurai Mask (武者仮面, Musha Kamen; 1-2): An armored samurai-like Masked Monster. In addition to his weapon mastery, Samurai Mask can transform into an ethereal form and transfer his life-force to inanimate objects.
- Bronze Mask (青銅仮面, Seidō Kamen; 1, 3): A bronze Masked Monster who oversees the Black Cross Army's development of a hydrogen bomb that would be used to annihilate the Goranger's headquarters. Bronze Mask is able to manipulate mechanical devices by playing into his bronze flute. The flute also doubles as a poisonous dart blower, serves as a Black Cross Army I.D. device and can be used to shoot out combustible sparks. For defensive capabilities, Bronze Mask can create a shield from his forearm and can transform into a durable bronze bell.
- Jade Mask (ヒスイ仮面, Hisui Kamen; 1, 4): A jade Masked Monster who intends to develop a corrosive breed of bacteria that will be filled in hot air balloon and then unleashed upon the Japanese populace. Jade Mask has no special powers and is armed with a thick calico pole for combat usage.
- Poison Gas Mask (毒ガス仮面, Dokugasu Kamen; 1, 4-5): A gas mask-wearing Masked Monster. Poison Gas Mask aims to steal precious metals/minerals from EAGLE caravans so as to maintain his poison gas factory. Poison Gas Mask can spray fumes of green colored poison gas from the nozzle located on his face. He also has poison filled side-armed missiles that violently explode upon impact. With his golden cape, Poison Gas Mask can shroud himself and teleport. Thanks to a special precious metal powered device inserted into his head, he is virtually immortal.
- Iron Hoop Mask (鉄輪仮面, Tetsuringu Kamen; 6): An iron Masked Monster composed of metal hoops.
- Crescent Moon Mask (三ヶ月仮面, Mikazuki Kamen; 7): A Masked Mutant in a red crescent moon mask.
- Poison Fang Mask (毒牙仮面, Dokukiba Kamen; 7-8): A Nāga-like Masked Monster.
- Witch Mask (魔女仮面, Majo Kamen; 9): A witch-like Masked Monster.
- Wing Mask (翼仮面, Tsubasa Kamen; 10): A Masked Monster in a bird-winged mask.
- Boat Ear Mask (舟耳仮面, Funamimi Kamen; 11): A Masked Monster in an Asian-style mask.
- Silver Heat Mask (銀熱仮面, Ginnetsu Kamen; 12): A Masked Monster in a fly mask.
- Horn Mask (角仮面, Tsuno Kamen; 13): A masked mutant in an unspecified horned beast mask.
- Skull Mask (ドクロ仮面, Dokuro Kamen; 14): A skeleton-like Masked Monster.
- Rainbow Mask (虹仮面, Niji Kamen; 15): A rainbow-manipulating Masked Monster in a rainbow-colored parrot mask used by Sun Mask.
- Mirror Mask (鏡仮面, Kagami Kamen; 15-16): A mirror-like Masked Monster used by Sun Mask.
- Black Hair Mask (黒髪仮面, Kurokami Kamen; 16-17): A Masked Monster in a segmented mask with long black hair used by Sun Mask.
- Cyclops Mask (一つ目仮面, Hitotsume Kamen; 18): A Hitotsume-kozō-like Masked Monster used by Sun Mask.
- Sword Kamen (剣仮面, Tsurugi Kamen; 19): A cavalier-like Masked Monster used by Sun Mask.
- Shot Mask (砲丸仮面, Hōgan Kamen; 21): A shot put-themed Masked Monster used by Temujin.
- Gear Mask (歯車仮面, Haguruma Kamen; 21-22): An upgrading Masked Monster in a gear mask used by Temujin.
- Wire Mask (針金仮面, Harigane Kamen; 22-23): A broom-wielding Masked Monster in a wire mask used by Temujin.
- Razor Mask (カミソリ仮面, Kamisori Kamen; 23-24): A razor-themed Masked Monster used by Temujin.
- Eight Eyed Mask (八ツ目仮面, Yatsume Kamen; 24-25): An eight-eyed lamprey-like Mask Monster used by Temujin.
- Blue Vein Mask (青すじ仮面, Aosuji Kamen; 26): A poison-creating Masked Monster used by Temujin.
- Iron Claw Mask (鉄の爪仮面, Tetsunotsume Kamen; 27): A Masked Monster in a clawed hand mask used by Temujin.
- Iron Comb Mask (鉄グシ仮面, Tetsugushi Kamen; 28): A comb-themed Masked Monster used by Temujin.
- Door Mask (扉仮面, Tobira Kamen; 29): A Masked Monster in a locked door-like mask used by Temujin.
- Mine Mask (機雷仮面, Kirai Kamen; 30): A naval mine-themed Masked Monster used by Temujin.
- Iron Tube Mask (鉄カン仮面, Tetsukan Kamen; 31): A Masked Monster in a tubed mask.
- Large Hatchet Mask (大ナタ仮面, Ōnata Kamen; 32): A hatchet-themed Masked Monster used by Temujin.
- Iron Princess Mask (鉄ヒメ仮面, Tetsuhime Kamen; 33): An iron maiden-themed Masked Monster used by Temujin.
- Red Face Mask (赤面仮面, Sekimen Kamen; 34): A backscratcher-wielding Masked Monster in a red mask with a printed circuit board on it used by Temujin.
- Steel Mask (スチール仮面, Suchīru Kamen; 35): A scissors staff-wielding Masked Monster in a knife-themed mask used by Temujin.
- Warship Mask (軍艦仮面, Gunkan Kamen; 36): A warship-themed Masked Monster used by Temujin.
- Fork Mask (フォーク仮面, Fōku Kamen; 37): A fork-themed Masked Monster used by Temujin.
- Pirate Mask (海賊仮面, Kaizoku Kamen; 38): A pirate-like Masked Monster with a hook for a left hand used by Temujin.
- Rock Face Mask (岩面仮面, Iwazura Kamen; 39): A Moai-themed Masked Monster used by Temujin.
- Iron Cage Mask (鉄カゴ仮面, Tetsukago Kamen; 40): A Masked Monster in an iron cage-themed mask.
- Iron Lion Mask (鉄獅子仮面, Tetsujishi Kamen; 41): A Chinese guardian lion/vending machine-themed Masked Monster used by Temujin.
- Diamond Mask (ダイヤモンド仮面, Daiyamondo Kamen; 43): A diamond-themed Masked Monster used by Magman.
- Electricity Mask (エレキ仮面, Ereki Kamen; 44): An electrokinetic binoviewer-themed Masked Monster used by Magman.
- Sword Shark Mask (剣ザメ仮面, Kenzame Kamen; 45): A shark-like Masked Monster used by Magman.
- Locomotive Mask (機関車仮面, Kikansha Kamen; 46): A locomotive-themed Masked Monster used by Magman.
- Bird Fang Mask (鳥牙仮面, Torikiba Kamen; 47): A Masked Monster in a bird-beaked mask used by Magman.
- Camera Mask (カメラ仮面, Kamera Kamen; 48): A camera-themed Masked Monster used by Magman.
- Horn Bone Mask (つの骨仮面, Tsunobone Kamen; 49): A bone-themed Masked Monster used by Magman.
- Iron Trap Mask (鉄ワナ仮面, Tetsuwana Kamen; 50): A foothold trap-themed Masked Monster used by Magman.
- Gunman Mask (ガンマン仮面, Ganman Kamen; 51): A revolver-masked cowboy-themed Masked Monster used by Magman.
- Telephone Mask (電話仮面, Denwa Kamen; 52): A rotary dial telephone-themed master assassin and master of voice mimicry able to retrieve any phone-based intel including faxes.
- Baseball Mask (野球仮面, Yakyū Kamen; 53): A baseball-themed Masked Monster used by Magman.
- Big Ear Mask (大耳仮面, Ōmimi Kamen; 55): A Masked Monster in an ear-themed mask used by Gold Mask.
- Faucet Mask (蛇口仮面, Jaguchi Kamen; 56): A faucet-themed Masked Monster used by Gold Mask.
- Bird Comb Mask (トサカ仮面, Tosaka Kamen; 57): A chicken-themed Masked Monster used by Gold Mask.
- Parabolic Mask (パラボラ仮面, Parabora Kamen; 58): A parabolic antenna-themed Masked Monster used by Gold Mask.
- Dead Bird Mask (死の鳥仮面, Shinotori Kamen; 59): A Pteranodon-themed Masked Monster used by Gold Mask.
- Shellfish Mask (妖貝仮面, Yōgai Kamen; 60): A clam-like Masked Monster used by Gold Mask.
- Ox Shoe Mask (牛靴仮面, Gyūgutsu Kamen; 61): A shoe-themed Masked Monster used by Gold Mask.
- Ribcage Mask (アバラ仮面, Abara Kamen; 62): A rib cage-themed Masked Monster used by Gold Mask.
- Television Mask (テレビ仮面, Terebi Kamen; 63): A Masked Monster in a television mask used by Gold Mask.
- Clock Mask (時計仮面, Tokei Kamen; 64): A clock-themed Masked Monster used by Gold Mask.
- Fallen Leaves Mask (落葉仮面, Rakuyō Kamen; 65): A leaf-themed Masked Monster used by Gold Mask.
- Windmill Mask (風車仮面, Fūsha Kamen; 66): A windmill-themed Masked Monster used by Gold Mask.
- Can Opener Mask (カンキリ仮面, Kankiri Kamen; 67): A can opener-masked drum-themed Masked Monster used by Gold Mask.
- Injection Mask (注射仮面, Chūsha Kamen; 68): A syringe-themed Masked Monster used by Gold Mask.
- Pineapple Mask (パイナップル仮面, Painappuru Kamen; 69): A pineapple-themed Masked Monster used by Gold Mask.
- Tire Mask (タイヤ仮面, Taiya Kamen; 70): A tire-themed Masked Monster used by Gold Mask.
- Piano Mask (ピアノ仮面, Piano Kamen; 71): A piano-themed Masked Monster used by Gold Mask.
- Anchor Mask (イカリ仮面, Ikari Kamen; 72): An anchor-themed Masked Monster used by Gold Mask.
- Kendo Mask (剣道仮面, Kendō Kamen; 73): A Kendo-themed Masked Monster used by Gold Mask.
- Glasses Mask (眼鏡仮面, Megane Kamen; 74): A glasses-masked Masked Monster used by Gold Mask.
- Stove Mask (ストーブ仮面, Sutōbu Kamen; 75): A stove-themed Masked Monster used by Gold Mask.
- Iron Spider Mask (鉄グモ仮面, Tetsugumo Kamen; 76): A spider-themed Masked Monster used by Gold Mask.
- Iron Snake Mask (鉄ヘビ仮面, Tetsuhebi Kamen; 77): A blood-draining snake-themed Masked Monster used by Gold Mask.
- Mammoth Mask (マンモス仮面, Manmosu Kamen; 78): A mammoth-themed Masked Monster used by Gold Mask.
- Skate Mask (スケート仮面, Sukēto Kamen; 79): A cryokinetic Masked Mutant in an ice skate mask.
- Steel Tiger Mask (鋼鉄虎仮面, Kōtetsutora Kamen; 80): A Smilodon-themed Masked Monster used by Gold Mask.
- Iron Kettle Mask (鉄ビン仮面, Tetsubin Kamen; 81): A kettle-themed Masked Monster used by Gold Mask.
- Yo-yo Mask (ヨーヨー仮面, Yōyō Kamen; 82): A yo-yo-themed Masked Monster used by Gold Mask.
- Tiger Mask (ダイガー仮面, Daigā Kamen; 83): A tiger-themed Masked Monster used by Gold Mask. Jiro Daigo was a member of EAGLE's Hokkaido Block who was thought dead during Jade Mask's attack and was transformed into the cyborg Tiger Mask after being found by the Black Cross Army.

== Episodes ==
No.	Title	Directed by	Written by	Original release date	Ratings
1	"The Crimson Sun! The Invincible Gorengers"; Transliteration: "Makka na Taiyō! Muteki Gorenjā" (Japanese: 真赤な太陽！無敵ゴレンジャー)	Kōichi Takemoto	Shōzō Uehara	April 5, 1975	15.2
2	"The Blue Earth! The Deadly Desertification Plan"; Transliteration: "Aoi Chikyū! Shi no Sabakuka Keikaku" (Japanese: 青い地球！死の砂漠化計画)	Kōichi Takemoto	Shōzō Uehara	April 12, 1975	14.4
3	"Big Counterattack! A Yellow Whirlwind"; Transliteration: "Dai Gyakushū! Kiiroi Tsumujikaze" (Japanese: 大逆襲！黄色いつむじ風)	Minoru Yamada	Shōzō Uehara	April 19, 1975	15.7
4	"A Crimson Kick! Smash the Great Microbe Plan"; Transliteration: "Kurenai no Kikku! Kudake Mikuro Dai Sakusen" (Japanese: 紅のキック！砕けミクロ大作戦)	Minoru Yamada	Shōzō Uehara	April 26, 1975	16.0
5	"Green Anger, Immortal Gas-Person"; Transliteration: "Midoriiro no Ikari Fujimi Gasu Ningen" (Japanese: みどり色の怒り 不死身ガス人間)	Katsuhiko Taguchi	Shōzō Uehara	May 3, 1975	16.2
6	"Red Riddle! Chase the Spy Route to the Sea"; Transliteration: "Akai Nazo! Supai Rūto o Umi ni Oe" (Japanese: 赤い謎！スパイルートを海に追え)	Katsuhiko Taguchi	Shōzō Uehara	May 10, 1975	16.8
7	"Pink Moonlight! Wolf Corps"; Transliteration: "Pinku no Gekkō! Ōkami Butai" (Japanese: ピンクの月光！オオカミ部隊)	Minoru Yamada	Shōzō Uehara	May 24, 1975	16.7
8	"Black Fear! The Murderous Poison Fang"; Transliteration: "Kuroi Kyōfu! Koroshi no Dokukiba" (Japanese: 黒い恐怖！殺しの毒牙)	Minoru Yamada	Susumu Takaku & Hikaru Arai	May 31, 1975	17.4
9	"Blue Shadow, Variblune Secret Strategy"; Transliteration: "Aoi Kagebōshi Bariburūn Himitsu Senryaku" (Japanese: 青い影法師 バリブルーン秘密戦略)	Itaru Orita	Shōzō Uehara	June 7, 1975	17.0
10	"The Red Balloon! Wind Speed at 100 Meters"; Transliteration: "Akai Fūsen! Fūsoku Hyaku-mētoru" (Japanese: 赤い風船！風速100メートル)	Itaru Orita	Shōzō Uehara	June 14, 1975	16.8
11	"Green Shudder! The Escape From Ear Hell"; Transliteration: "Midoriiro no Senritsu! Mimi Jigoku kara no Dasshutsu" (Japanese: みどり色の戦慄！耳地獄からの脱出)	Minoru Yamada	Shōzō Uehara	June 21, 1975	18.1
12	"Super Energy of Silver! Burning Hell"; Transliteration: "Gin'iro no Chō Enerugī! Shōnetsu Jigoku" (Japanese: 銀色の超エネルギー！焦熱地獄)	Minoru Yamada	Susumu Takaku & Hikaru Arai	June 28, 1975	17.3
13	"The Pink Secret! Defeat the Human Bomb"; Transliteration: "Pinku no Himitsu! Ningen Bakudan o Taose" (Japanese: ピンクの秘密！人間爆弾を倒せ)	Katsuhiko Taguchi	Shōzō Uehara	July 5, 1975	18.6
14	"The Red Coffin! The Mysterious Skull Mansion"; Transliteration: "Akai Kan'oke! Dokuro Yashiki no Kai" (Japanese: 赤い棺桶！ドクロ屋敷の怪)	Katsuhiko Taguchi	Hirohisa Soda	July 12, 1975	17.0
15	"The Big Blue Fortress! Big Raging Variblune"; Transliteration: "Aoi Dai Yōsai! Ō Abare Bariburūn" (Japanese: 青い大要塞！大暴れバリブルーン)	Kōichi Takemoto	Shōzō Uehara	July 26, 1975	13.9
16	"White Weirdness! The Eye in the Mirror"; Transliteration: "Shiroi Kaiki! Kagami no Naka no Me" (Japanese: 白い怪奇！鏡の中の目)	Kōichi Takemoto	Shōzō Uehara	August 2, 1975	12.9
17	"The Purple Theme Park! A Demonic Cemetery"; Transliteration: "Murasakiiro no Yūenchi! Akuma no Hakaba" (Japanese: むらさき色の遊園地！悪魔の墓場)	Minoru Yamada	Susumu Takaku & Hikaru Arai	August 9, 1975	14.0
18	"Horrible Black Crusaders! Attack According to the (Secret) Plan"; Transliteration: "Senritsu no Kuro Jūjigun! Maruhi Sakusen de Kōgeki Seyo" (Japanese: 戦慄の黒十字軍！㊙作戦で攻撃せよ)	Minoru Yamada	Kimio Hirayama	August 16, 1975	13.0
19	"A Blue Spark! The Spy Front That Floats in the Sea"; Transliteration: "Aoi Hibana! Umi ni Ukabu Supai Sensen" (Japanese: 青い火花！海に浮かぶスパイ戦線)	Katsuhiko Taguchi	Keisuke Fujikawa	August 23, 1975	17.1
20	"Crimson Fight to the Death! Sun Mask vs. Akarenger"; Transliteration: "Makka na Shitō! Nichirin Kamen Tai Akarenjā" (Japanese: 真赤な死闘！日輪仮面対アカレンジャー)	Katsuhiko Taguchi	Shōzō Uehara	August 30, 1975	17.6
21	"Blue Miracle! The Mysterious Airship That Came From Antiquity"; Transliteration: "Aoi Kyōi! Kodai kara Kita Kai Hikōsen" (Japanese: 青い驚異！古代から来た怪飛行船)	Minoru Yamada	Shōzō Uehara	September 6, 1975	17.9
22	"Yellow Air Raid! Nightmares of Atlantis"; Transliteration: "Kiiroi Kūshū! Atorantisu no Akumu" (Japanese: 黄色い空襲！アトランティスの悪夢)	Minoru Yamada	Shōzō Uehara	September 13, 1975	15.4
23	"Green Dogfight! The End of the Mysterious Airship"; Transliteration: "Midori no Kūchūsen! Kai Hikōsen no Saigo" (Japanese: みどりの空中戦！怪飛行船の最期)	Minoru Yamada	Shōzō Uehara	September 20, 1975	17.2
24	"Blue Anger! Strong Midomerang, Big Counterattack"; Transliteration: "Aoi Ikari! Kyōretsu Midomeran Dai Gyakushū" (Japanese: 青い怒り！強烈ミドメラン大逆襲)	Katsuhiko Taguchi	Shōzō Uehara	October 4, 1975	16.2
25	"Crimson Fuse! Lamprey Torpedo Attack"; Transliteration: "Makka na Dōkasen! Yatsume no Gyorai Kōgeki" (Japanese: 真赤な導火線！八ツ目の魚雷攻撃)	Katsuhiko Taguchi	Susumu Takaku & Hikaru Arai	October 11, 1975	19.0
26	"Multi-Changing Blue Veins! The Dreadful Poison Expert"; Transliteration: "Aosuji Shichi Henge! Kyōfu no Dokuyaku Hakase" (Japanese: 青すじ七変化！恐怖の毒薬博士)	Katsuhiko Taguchi	Hirohisa Soda	October 18, 1975	21.0
27	"Yellow Object Q! Gorenger Base S.O.S."; Transliteration: "Kiiroi Buttai Kyū! Gorenjā Kichi Esu Ō Esu" (Japanese: 黄色い物体Q！ゴレンジャー基地SOS)	Itaru Orita	Shōzō Uehara	October 25, 1975	19.4
28	"Big Red Eruption! Infiltrate the Underground Base"; Transliteration: "Akai Dai Funka! Chitei Kichi ni Sen'nyū Seyo" (Japanese: 赤い大噴火！地底基地に潜入せよ)	Minoru Yamada	Shōzō Uehara	November 1, 1975	19.4
29	"Red Pursuit! The Mysterious Seal Train"; Transliteration: "Akai Tsuigeki! Nazo no Fūin Ressha" (Japanese: 赤い追撃！なぞの封印列車)	Itaru Orita	Hirohisa Soda	November 8, 1975	19.2
30	"Golden Columns of Fire! A Great Explosion of Consecutive Mines"; Transliteration: "Kin'iro no Hibashira! Kirai Renzoku Dai Bakuhatsu" (Japanese: 金色の火柱！機雷連続大爆発)	Minoru Yamada	Susumu Takaku & Hikaru Arai	November 15, 1975	19.0
31	"The Black Challenge! Enrage, Five Stars of Justice"; Transliteration: "Kuroi Chōsenjō! Ikare Itsutsu no Seigi no Hoshi" (Japanese: 黒い挑戦状！怒れ五つの正義の星)	Minoru Yamada	Kimio Hirayama	November 22, 1975	18.0
32	"Hot Blue Wind! No Response from Variblune"; Transliteration: "Aoi Neppū! Bariburūn Ōtō Nashi" (Japanese: 青い熱風！バリブルーン応答なし)	Hidetoshi Kitamura	Shōzō Uehara	November 29, 1975	20.8
33	"The Red Target! A Fake Gorenger Appears"; Transliteration: "Akai Hyōteki! Nisemono Gorenjā Shutsugen" (Japanese: 赤い標的！にせものゴレンジャー出現)	Hidetoshi Kitamura	Hirohisa Soda	December 6, 1975	19.6
34	"The Yellow Spy Battle! You Saw the Power of YTC"; Transliteration: "Kiiroi Supai-sen! Mita ka Wai Tī Shī no Iryoku" (Japanese: 黄色いスパイ戦！見たかYTCの威力)	Hidetoshi Kitamura	Shōzō Uehara	December 20, 1975	17.6
35	"Big Strange Black Bird! Condoler: War Bomber Fleet"; Transliteration: "Kuroi Dai Kaichō! Kondorā Sentō Bakugekitai" (Japanese: 黒い大怪鳥！コンドラー戦斗爆撃隊)	Katsuhiko Taguchi	Shōzō Uehara	December 27, 1975	18.8
36	"The Fierce Crimson Charge! The Mobile Fortress Invincible Battleship"; Transliteration: "Makka na Mō Shingeki! Ugoku Yōsai Muteki Senkan" (Japanese: 真赤な猛進撃！動く要塞無敵戦艦)	Katsuhiko Taguchi	Shōzō Uehara	January 10, 1976	16.9
37	"A Pure White Flash! The Black Cross Führer's True Form"; Transliteration: "Masshiroi Senkō! Kuro Jūji Sōtō no Shōtai" (Japanese: 真白い閃光！黒十字総統の正体)	Katsuhiko Taguchi	Shōzō Uehara	January 17, 1976	20.0
38	"The Blue Cliff! The Search for Demonic Pirate Treasure"; Transliteration: "Aoi Dangai! Akuma no Kaizoku Takara Sagashi" (Japanese: 青い断崖！悪魔の海賊宝さがし)	Minoru Yamada	Hirohisa Soda	January 31, 1976	19.5
39	"Crimson Sea of Japan! The Superpower of the Mysterious Meteorite"; Transliteration: "Makka na Nihonkai! Kai Inseki no Chōnōryoku" (Japanese: 真赤な日本海！怪隕石の超能力)	Minoru Yamada	Hirohisa Soda	February 7, 1976	20.6
40	"The Crimson Vengeance Demon! The Infernal Momorenger"; Transliteration: "Kurenai no Fukushūki! Jigoku no Momorenjā" (Japanese: 紅の復讐鬼！地獄のモモレンジャー)	Katsuhiko Taguchi	Shōzō Uehara	February 14, 1976	19.6
41	"Big Black Counterattack! The Battle of Tottori Dune"; Transliteration: "Kuroi Dai Gyakuten! Tottori Sakyū no Kōbōsen" (Japanese: 黒い大逆転！鳥取砂丘の攻防戦)	Minoru Yamada	Hirohisa Soda	February 28, 1976	22.3
42	"The Black Ironman Dies! Farewell, Variblune"; Transliteration: "Kuro no Tetsujin Shisu! Saraba Bariburūn" (Japanese: 黒の鉄人死す！さらばバリブルーン)	Kōichi Takemoto	Shōzō Uehara	March 13, 1976	17.1
43	"The Crimson Phoenix! Enter, the Invincible Varidorin"; Transliteration: "Makka na Fushichō! Muteki Baridorīn Tōjō" (Japanese: 真赤な不死鳥！無敵バリドリーン登場)	Kōichi Takemoto	Shōzō Uehara	March 20, 1976	15.4
44	"Blue Multi-Purpose Tank! Varitank Launches"; Transliteration: "Aoi Bannō Sensha! Baritanku Hasshin" (Japanese: 青い万能戦車！バリタンク発進)	Kōichi Takemoto	Shōzō Uehara	March 27, 1976	18.5
45	"Dark Sword Shark! Attack of the Marine Hitman"; Transliteration: "Ankoku no Ken-zame! Umi no Koroshiya Shūrai" (Japanese: 暗黒の剣鮫！海の殺し屋襲来)	Minoru Yamada	Shōzō Uehara	April 3, 1976	18.7
46	"Black Super Express! Locomotive Mask's Big Rampage"; Transliteration: "Kuroi Chōtokkyū! Kikansha Kamen Dai Bōsō" (Japanese: 黒い超特急！機関車仮面大暴走)	Minoru Yamada	Shōzō Uehara	April 10, 1976	19.0
47	"Big Red Counterattack! The Furious Gorenger"; Transliteration: "Akai Dai Gyakushū! Ikari no Gorenjā" (Japanese: 赤い大逆襲！怒りのゴレンジャー)	Minoru Yamada	Shōzō Uehara	April 17, 1976	16.5
48	"The Black Supply Depot! Close Call at the Theme Park"; Transliteration: "Kuroi Hokyū Kichi! Yūenchi Kikiippatsu" (Japanese: 黒い補給基地！遊園地危機一髪)	Katsuhiko Taguchi	Susumu Takaku & Hikaru Arai	April 24, 1976	16.4
49	"The Big Green Escape! The Swirling Trick Play"; Transliteration: "Midori no Dai Dassō! Manji no Torikku Purei" (Japanese: みどりの大脱走！卍のトリックプレイ)	Katsuhiko Taguchi	Hirohisa Soda	May 1, 1976	18.5
50	"The Blue-Winged Secret! Look out, Varidorin"; Transliteration: "Aoi Tsubasa no Himitsu! Ayaushi Baridorīn" (Japanese: 青い翼の秘密！危うしバリドリーン)	Katsuhiko Taguchi	Hirohisa Soda	May 8, 1976	15.6
51	"The Making of Blue Counterfeit Money! The Sunset Gunman"; Transliteration: "Aoi Nisesatsu-zukuri! Yūhi no Ganman" (Japanese: 青いニセ札づくり！夕陽のガンマン)	Minoru Yamada	Hirohisa Soda	May 15, 1976	14.6
52	"The Pink Telephone Demon! The Murderous Dial"; Transliteration: "Pinku no Denwaki! Koroshi no Daiyaru" (Japanese: ピンクの電話鬼！殺しのダイヤル)	Minoru Yamada	Shōzō Uehara	May 29, 1976	15.4
53	"The Red Home Run King! The Deadly Number 1"; Transliteration: "Akai Hōmu Ran Ō! Hissatsu no Sebangō Ichi" (Japanese: 赤いホームラン王！必殺の背番号1)	Minoru Yamada	Hirohisa Soda	June 5, 1976	16.4
54	"Crimson Challenge! The Volcano's Last Big Eruption"; Transliteration: "Makka na Chōsen! Hi no Yama Saigo no Dai Funka" (Japanese: 真赤な挑戦！火の山最期の大噴火)	Katsuhiko Taguchi	Shōzō Uehara	June 19, 1976	14.6
55	"The Colored Daishogun! Tutankamen's Curse"; Transliteration: "Kin'iro no Daishōgun! Tsutankāmen no Noroi" (Japanese: 金色の大将軍！ツタンカーメンの呪い)	Katsuhiko Taguchi	Shōzō Uehara	July 3, 1976	16.3
56	"Blue Summer Vacation! A Demon's Killing Beach"; Transliteration: "Aoi Natsuyasumi! Ma no Satsujin Kaigan" (Japanese: 青い夏休み！魔の殺人海岸)	Minoru Yamada	Susumu Takaku & Hikaru Arai	July 10, 1976	15.7
57	"The Black Encircling Net! Five-Faced Peggy"; Transliteration: "Kuroi Hōimō! Itsutsu no Kao no Pegī" (Japanese: 黒い包囲網！五つの顔のペギー)	Minoru Yamada	Hirohisa Soda	July 31, 1976	8.7
58	"Crimson Ambition! His Excellency the Führer's Gold Castle"; Transliteration: "Makka na Yabō! Sōtō Kakka no Ōgon-jō" (Japanese: 真赤な野望！総統閣下の黄金城)	Minoru Yamada	Shōzō Uehara	August 7, 1976	9.8
59	"The Crimson South! The Mysterious Big Gold Plan"; Transliteration: "Makka na Nangoku! Nazo no Gōrudo Dai Sakusen" (Japanese: 真赤な南国！謎のゴールド大作戦)	Minoru Yamada	Shōzō Uehara	September 4, 1976	11.5
60	"Blue Inland Sea! The Floating Secret Fortress Island"; Transliteration: "Aoi Setonaikai! Ukabu Himitsu Yōsai-tō" (Japanese: 青い瀬戸内海！浮ぶ秘密要塞島)	Minoru Yamada	Hirohisa Soda	September 11, 1976	12.7
61	"The Pink KO Punch! The End-Ball Game"; Transliteration: "Momoiro no Kei Ō Panchi! Endo Bōru Shōbu" (Japanese: 桃色のKOパンチ！エンドボール勝負)	Minoru Yamada	Hirohisa Soda	September 18, 1976	11.4
62	"The White Mystery! The Trap of the Grim Reaper's Mansion"; Transliteration: "Shiroi Kaiki! Shinigami Yakata no Wana" (Japanese: 白い怪奇！死神館の罠)	Katsuhiko Taguchi	Shōzō Uehara	September 25, 1976	16.0
63	"A Flash of Black Lightning! The Protruding Cannon"; Transliteration: "Kuroi Denkōsekka! Tobidasu Taihō" (Japanese: 黒い電光石火！飛び出す大砲)	Katsuhiko Taguchi	Hirohisa Soda	October 2, 1976	12.5
64	"Blue UFO!! The Space Army's Big Invasion"; Transliteration: "Aoi Yūfō!! Uchū Gundan Dai Shūrai" (Japanese: 青いUFO！！宇宙軍団大襲来)	Kōichi Takemoto	Shōzō Uehara	October 16, 1976	15.1
65	"The Crimson Suicide Squad!! The Crowded Black Cross Castle Raid"; Transliteration: "Makka na Kesshitai!! Nagurikomi Kuro Jūjijō" (Japanese: 真赤な決死隊！！殴りこみ黒十字城)	Kōichi Takemoto	Shōzō Uehara	October 23, 1976	11.6
66	"The Red Hostage Exchange!! Battlers' Big Charge"; Transliteration: "Akai Hitojichi Kōkan!! Battorā Dai Bakugeki" (Japanese: 赤い人質交換！！バットラー大爆撃)	Kōichi Takemoto	Susumu Takaku & Hikaru Arai	October 30, 1976	15.9
67	"Crimson Special Attack!! Kirenger Dies at Sunset"; Transliteration: "Makka na Tokkō!! Kirenjā Yūhi ni Shisu" (Japanese: 真赤な特攻！！キレンジャー夕陽に死す)	Michio Konishi	Shōzō Uehara	November 6, 1976	13.9
68	"The Pink Rebellion!! The Big Attack of Needle-Needle-Needle"; Transliteration: "Pinku no Hanran!! Hari Hari Hari no Dai Kōgeki" (Japanese: ピンクの反乱！！針・針・針の大攻撃)	Michio Konishi	Susumu Takaku & Hikaru Arai	November 13, 1976	15.7
69	"The New Multicolored Vehicle!! Varikikyun Launches"; Transliteration: "Goshiki no Shin Heiki!! Barikikyūn Hasshin" (Japanese: 五色の新兵器！！バリキキューン発進)	Minoru Yamada	Shōzō Uehara	November 20, 1976	13.2
70	"Blue Counterattack!! Stop the Space Express"; Transliteration: "Aoi Gyakushū!! Uchū Tokkyū o Sutoppu Seyo" (Japanese: 青い逆襲！！宇宙特急をストップせよ)	Minoru Yamada	Shōzō Uehara	November 27, 1976	17.7
71	"Big Crimson Decisive Battle!! The Earth Migration Plan"; Transliteration: "Makka na Dai Kessen!! Chikyū Idō Keikaku" (Japanese: 真赤な大決戦！！地球移動計画)	Minoru Yamada	Shōzō Uehara	December 4, 1976	14.2
72	"Blue Secrecy!! Varidorin Left to be Dismantled"; Transliteration: "Aoi Kimitsu!! Kaitai Sareta Baridorīn" (Japanese: 青い機密！！解体されたバリドリーン)	Kōichi Takemoto	Shōzō Uehara	December 11, 1976	13.7
73	"Black Whirlwind!! It's a Contest! A Straight Line"; Transliteration: "Kuroi Tsumujikaze!! Shōbu da! Itchokusen" (Japanese: 黒いつむじ風！！勝負だ！一直線)	Kōichi Takemoto	Shōzō Uehara	December 18, 1976	14.9
74	"Freezing Blue Wave!! The Plan to Freeze Earth"; Transliteration: "Aoi Dai Kanpa!! Chikyū Kōrizuke Sakusen" (Japanese: 青い大寒波！！地球氷づけ作戦)	Kōichi Takemoto	Susumu Takaku & Hikaru Arai	December 25, 1976	16.8
75	"Fiery Crimson Hell!! Stove Mask's Conspiracy"; Transliteration: "Makka na Kaen Jigoku!! Sutōbu Kamen no Inbō" (Japanese: 真赤な火炎地獄！！ストーブ仮面の陰謀)	Katsuhiko Taguchi	Shōzō Uehara	January 8, 1977	13.0
76	"Crimson Infiltration!! Did You See Tsuyoshi Kaijo?"; Transliteration: "Makka na Sen'nyū!! Kimi wa Kaijō Tsuyoshi o Mita ka?" (Japanese: 真赤な潜入！！君は海城剛を見たか?)	Katsuhiko Taguchi	Hirohisa Soda	January 15, 1977	12.7
77	"Black Fear!! The Bloodsucking Snake Woman"; Transliteration: "Kuroi Kyōfu!! Kyūketsu Hebi On'na" (Japanese: 黒い恐怖！！吸血へび女)	Katsuhiko Taguchi	Shōzō Uehara	January 22, 1977	14.0
78	"Black Jamming!! A Primeval Roar"; Transliteration: "Kuroi Bōgai Denpa!! Genshi no Otakebi" (Japanese: 黒い妨害電波！！原始の雄叫び)	Minoru Yamada	Susumu Takaku & Hikaru Arai	January 29, 1977	14.5
79	"Crimson Pursuit!! The Formless Assassin's True Form"; Transliteration: "Makka na Tsuiseki!! Sugata Naki Ansatsusha no Shōtai" (Japanese: 真赤な追跡！！姿なき暗殺者の正体)	Minoru Yamada	Shōzō Uehara	February 5, 1977	15.4
80	"Crimson Crossing in Enemy Territory! Escape to Hope"; Transliteration: "Makka na Tekichū Ōdan! Kibō e no Dasshutsu" (Japanese: 真赤な敵中横断！希望への脱出)	Minoru Yamada	Hirohisa Soda	February 12, 1977	15.3
81	"Black Doubt!! The Murder Spy's Trap"; Transliteration: "Kuroi Giwaku!! Satsujin Supai no Wana" (Japanese: 黒い疑惑！！殺人スパイの罠)	Katsuhiko Taguchi	Shōzō Uehara	February 19, 1977	13.8
82	"Black Magician!! Mystery of the Dollhouse?!"; Transliteration: "Kuroi Majutsushi!! Ningyō Yakata no Kai?!" (Japanese: 黒い魔術師！！人形館の怪?！)	Katsuhiko Taguchi	Hirohisa Soda	February 26, 1977	13.9
83	"Orange First Love!! The Roaring Megalopolis"; Transliteration: "Orenji-iro no Hatsukoi!! Hoeru Dai Tokai" (Japanese: オレンジ色の初恋！！吼える大都会)	Katsuhiko Taguchi	Shōzō Uehara	March 12, 1977	14.4
84 (Final)	"Great Crimson Victory!! Shine Forever, Five Stars"; Transliteration: "Makka na Dai Shōri!! Towa ni Kagayake Itsutsu Boshi" (Japanese: 真赤な大勝利！！永久に輝け五ツ星)	Minoru Yamada	Shōzō Uehara	March 26, 1977	11.8

== Films ==
- Himitsu Sentai Gorenger: The Movie (秘密戦隊ゴレンジャー, Himitsu Sentai Gorenjā): Released on July 26, 1975. The movie version of episode 6.
- Himitsu Sentai Gorenger: The Blue Fortress (秘密戦隊ゴレンジャー 青い大要塞, Himitsu Sentai Gorenjā Aoi Daiyōsai): Released on December 20, 1975. The movie version of episode 15.
- Himitsu Sentai Gorenger: The Red Death Match (秘密戦隊ゴレンジャー 真赤な猛進撃！, Himitsu Sentai Gorenjā Makka na Mōshingeki!): Released on March 20, 1976. The movie version of episode 36.
- Himitsu Sentai Gorenger: Fire Mountain's Final Explosion (秘密戦隊ゴレンジャー 火の山最後の大噴火, Himitsu Sentai Gorenjā Hi no Yama Saigo no Daifunka): Released on December 19, 1976. The movie version of episode 54.
- Himitsu Sentai Gorenger: The Bomb Hurricane (秘密戦隊ゴレンジャー 爆弾ハリケーン, Himitsu Sentai Gorenjā Bakudan Harikēn): Released on July 18, 1976.
- J.A.K.Q. Dengekitai vs. Gorenger (ジャッカー電撃隊VSゴレンジャー, Jakkā Dengekitai Tai Gorenjā): Released on March 18, 1978.

Hitmitsu Sentai Gorenger: The Bomb Hurricane, Directed by Minoru Yamada, Written by Shōzō Uehara.

J.A.K.Q. Dengekitai vs. Gorenger, Directed by Katsuhiko Taguchi, Written by Shōzō Uehara.

== International broadcast ==
In the United States, the original Japanese version was broadcast in Hawaii on Honolulu's KIKU-TV with English subtitles from 1975 through 1976, and the actors made personal appearances to promote the series. An unsubtitled version was also broadcast in California, on Sacramento, California's KMUV-TV in 1976, San Francisco's KOFY-TV in 1977.

== Manga ==
The series was adapted into a manga written and drawn by Ishinomori and published in Weekly Shōnen Sunday magazine from May 4, 1975, to August 17, 1975 and a second manga was published in Shogaku Gonensei magazine for fifth graders between April and July, 1975. In 2021, Seven Seas Entertainment licensed both manga outside Japan for North American territories.

== Cast ==
- Tsuyoshi Kaijo: Naoya Makoto (誠 直也, Makoto Naoya)
- Akira Shinmei: Hiroshi Miyauchi (宮内 洋, Miyauchi Hiroshi)
- Daita Oiwa: Baku Hatakeyama (畠山 麦, Hatakeyama Baku)
- Daigoro Kumano: Jirō Daruma (だるま 二郎, Daruma Jirō)
- Peggy Matsuyama: Lisa Komaki (小牧 りさ, Komaki Risa)
- Kenji Asuka: Yukio Itō (伊藤 幸雄, Itō Yukio)
- Yoko Kato: Eri Kanuma (鹿沼 えり, Kanuma Eri)
- Tomoko Hayashi: Emi Shirakawa (白川 恵美, Shirakawa Emi)
- Haruko Nakamura: Miki Honda (本田 みき, Honda Miki)
- Taro Kato (加藤 太郎, Katō Tarō): Hiroyuki Konuma (小沼 宏之, Konuma Hiroyuki)
- Black Cross Führer: Mitsuo Andō (安藤 三男, Andō Mitsuo; 1–55), Nobuo Yana (八名 信夫, Yana Nobuo; 56–84)
- Gonpachi Edogawa: Toshio Takahara (高原 駿雄, Takahara Toshio)

=== Voice actors ===
- Gon (ゴン): Hisako Kyōda (京田 尚子, Kyōda Hisako)
- Sun Mask (日輪仮面, Nichirin Kamen): Hiroshi Masuoka (増岡 弘, Masuoka Hiroshi)
- General Iron Mask Temujin (鉄人仮面テムジン将軍, Tetsujin Kamen Temujin Shōgun): Shōzō Iizuka (飯塚 昭三, Iizuka Shōzō)
- General Fire Mountain Mask Magman (火の山仮面マグマン将軍, Hinoyama Kamen Maguman Shōgun): Eisuke Yoda (依田英助, Yoda Eisuke; 42–44), Shōzō Iizuka (45–54)
- Great General Golden Mask (ゴールデン仮面大将軍, Gōruden Kamen Daishōgun): Shōzō Iizuka
- Narrator: Nobuo Tanaka (田中 信夫, Tanaka Nobuo; 1–14): Tōru Ōhira (大平 透, Ōhira Tōru; 15–84)

== Songs ==
Opening theme

- "Susume! Gorenger" (進め！ゴレンジャー, Susume! Gorenjā; "Proceed! Gorenger")
  - Lyrics: Shotaro Ishinomori
  - Composition & arrangement: Chumei Watanabe
  - Artists: Isao Sasaki, Mitsuko Horie, & Columbia Yurikago Kai

Ending themes

- "Himitsu Sentai Gorenger" (秘密戦隊ゴレンジャー, Himitsu Sentai Gorenjā; "Secret Squadron Gorenger")
  - Lyrics: Saburo Yatsude
  - Composition & Arrangement: Chumei Watanabe
  - Artist: Isao Sasaki & Koorogi '73
  - Episodes: 1–63
- "Mi yo!! Gorenger" (見よ!!ゴレンジャー, Mi yo!! Gorenjā; "Look!! Gorenger")
  - Lyrics: Shotaro Ishinomori
  - Composition & Arrangement: Chumei Watanabe
  - Artists: Isao Sasaki, Koorogi '73, & Wilbees
  - Episodes: 64–84
