= Tatsuo Yamada =

Japanese actor (1956–2009)

- Born: January 10, 1956; Toyama, Japan
- Died: July 26, 2009
- Occupation: Actor

Tatsuo Yamada (山田 辰夫, Yamada Tatsuo; January 10, 1956 – July 26, 2009) was a Japanese actor best known for the protagonist of Sōgo Ishii's 1980 film Crazy Thunder Road.

== Filmography ==
- Crazy Thunder Road (1980)
- Yokohama BJ Blues (1981)
- Leave My Girl Alone (1986)
- Welter (1987)
- Evil Dead Trap 3: Broken Love Killer (1993)
- Shinjuku Outlaw (1994)
- Another Lonely Hitman (1995)
- Berlin (1995)
- Whiteout (2000)
- Chloe (2001)
- Sabu (2002)
- When the Last Sword Is Drawn (2003)
- Tokyo Noir (2004)
- Scrap Heaven (2005)
- The Battery (2007)
- Be a Man! Samurai School (2008)
- Departures (2008)
