= Emiri Henmi =

Japanese actress, television personality, model, and fashion entrepreneur (born 1976)

- 辺見 えみり
- Born: December 16, 1976 (age 49); Tokyo, Japan
- Occupations: Actress, television personality, model, fashion entrepreneur
- Years active: 1993–present
- Spouses: Kimiyasu Kudō (m. 2006; div. 2008) Kenji Matsuda (m. 2011; div. 2018)
- Children: 1
- Mother: Mari Henmi

Emiri Henmi (辺見 えみり, Henmi Emiri; born 16 December 1976) is a Japanese actress, television personality, model, and fashion entrepreneur. She is the daughter of singer and actress Mari Henmi. She began her career in the early 1990s as an actress before transitioning into television personality work and later expanding into fashion and lifestyle business ventures.

== Biography ==
Emiri Henmi was born on 16 December 1976 in Tokyo, Japan, as the daughter of singer and actress Mari Henmi.

She made her acting debut in 1993 in the television drama Ichigo Hakusho, playing Tomoko Mamiya. She appeared in several television dramas throughout the 1990s as she built her early career in entertainment.

By the late 1990s, Henmi began appearing regularly on variety shows and talk programs, gradually shifting her focus from acting to television personality work. During this period, she became widely recognized for her fashion sense and media presence.

In 2006, Henmi married comedian Kimiyasu Kudō. The couple divorced in 2008 after approximately two years of marriage.

After her divorce, she continued her work in television and increasingly became associated with fashion and lifestyle media. She appeared frequently in magazines and began taking part in fashion-related projects and collaborations.

In 2011, Henmi married actor Kenji Matsuda. In 2013, she gave birth to their daughter. The couple divorced in 2018 and stated that they would continue cooperating in raising their child after the separation.

From the 2000s onward, Henmi expanded into fashion production and branding. She worked as a creative director for apparel brands, participated in lifestyle collaborations, and authored fashion-related publications. Through these activities, she became established as both a television personality and fashion entrepreneur.

She remains active in television and lifestyle media while continuing her involvement in fashion-related projects.

== Filmography ==
=== Television ===
- Ichigo Hakusho (1993) – Tomoko Mamiya
- Various television dramas and variety programs (1990s–present)

=== Films ===
- Various film appearances

=== Dubbing ===
- Blow – Mirtha Jung (Penélope Cruz)

== Bibliography ==
- Fashion and lifestyle publications (titles to be added)
