= Onibi: The Fire Within =

- DVD cover

Japanese name
- Kanji: 鬼火
- Directed by: Rokuro Mochizuki
- Written by: Toshiyuki Morioka
- Produced by: Yoshinori Chiba; Toshiki Kimura
- Starring: Yoshio Harada; Reiko Kataoka; Show Aikawa; Kazuki Kitamura; Ryushi Mizukami
- Cinematography: Naosuke Imaizumi
- Edited by: Yasushi Shimamura
- Music by: Kenichi Kamio
- Distributed by: Gaga Communications
- Release date: April 19, 1997 (Japan)
- Running time: 101 minutes
- Country: Japan
- Language: Japanese

Onibi: The Fire Within (Japanese: 鬼火) is a 1997 Japanese film directed by Rokuro Mochizuki.

== Cast ==
- Yoshio Harada as Noriyuki Kunihiro
- Reiko Kataoka as Asako Hino
- Show Aikawa as Naoto Tanigawa
- Kazuki Kitamura as Hideyuki Sakata
- Ryushi Mizukami as Hanamura
- Hiroyuki Tsunekawa as Satoshi Fujima
- Ryuji Yamamoto as Hiroshi Fujima
- Yoshiaki Fujita as Kinjo
- Ei Kawakami as Yoshida
- Toshihiro Kinomoto as Aoki
- Seiroku Nakazawa as Nagashima
- Masai Ikenaga as Kizaki
- Eiji Minakata as Kanigawa
- Hajime Yamazaki as Driving School Teacher
- Eiji Okuda as Myojin

== Awards and nominations ==
19th Yokohama Film Festival

- Won: Best Film
- Won: Best Director as Rokuro Mochizuki
- Won: Best Actor as Yoshio Harada
- Won: Best Supporting Actress as Reiko Kataoka
