= Eri Kanuma =

Japanese actress

- 鹿沼 絵里
- Born: Toshie Suganuma; 1 December 1952 (age 73); Tokyo, Japan
- Other names: Toshie Furuoya (real name)
- Occupation: Actress
- Years active: 1970–
- Height: 161 cm (5 ft 3 in)
- Spouse: Masato Furuoya (m. 1982–2003)

Eri Kanuma (鹿沼 絵里, 鹿沼えり, Kanuma Eri; real name Toshie Furuoya (古尾谷登志江, Furuoya Toshie; née Suganuma (菅沼)); born 1 December 1952) is a Japanese actress. Her husband was actor Masato Furuoya.

== Filmography ==
=== Films ===
Year	Title	Role	Ref.
1973	Jitsuroku Andō-gumi: Shūgeki-hen		
1976	Bakuhatsu! Bōsō Yūgi	Mako	
1976	Himitsu Sentai Gorenger: The Bomb Hurricane	Yoko Kato	
1977	Utamaro Yume to Shiri seba	Omiyo	
1977	Ore no Sora	Shirakawa-sensei	
1977	Seibo Kannon Taibosatsu	Young lady	
1978	Tokiniha Shōfu no yō ni	Mako	
1979	Niku no Hyōteki: Ubau!!	Yumi Kamijo	
1979	Tenshi no harawata: Mei-bi	Nami Tsuchiya	
1979	Koichiro Uno no Onna Taiiku Kyōshi	Atashi	
1979	Eros Gakuen: Hatsujō Jidai	Keiko Mihara	
1979	Danchi Tsuma: Nikuyoku no Tōsui	Taeko Oka	
1980	Shūdō Onna: Kokui no Naka no uzuki	Yuki Kamino	
1980	Skeban Mafia Nikkei: Lynch	Sachiko	
1980	Asa wa Dameyo!	Miki	
1980	Kangofu Nikki: Waisetsuna Karute	Yuka	
1980	Koichiro Uno no Uwaki Nikki	Yuriko Kanai	
1981	Jokyōshi: Kegareta Hōkago	Tomoko Nomoto	
1981	Yokohama BJ Blues	Midori Hayashi	
1981	Kōshoku Hana den sha	Maruko Tsuzuki	
1981	Mayonaka no Jōtaijō	Rie Harada	
1981	Enrai	Toshie Wada	
1983	Nogare no Machi	Aunt of Yakitori Shop	
1984	Chi-n-pi-ra	Bibi	
1984	Omoide no Anne	Reiko Niimura	
1994	800 Two Lap Runners	Yoshiko Nakazawa	
1997	Ichigo Dōmei	Yoshiko Uehara	
2001	Ikiryō: Ikisudama	Mitsue Yoshino	
2009	Fuakari Minato		

=== Direct-to-video ===
Year	Title	Ref.
1995	Nanpa-ya Ken	
1997	Kagerō: Toshi no Yakuzana Mainichi	
2000	Otoko-tachi no Bohyō: Jiken Yakagyō	

=== TV dramas ===
Year	Title	Role	Network	Ref.
1972	Isshin Tasuke	Osome	Fuji TV	
1972	Taiyō ni Hoero!	Yuka (episode 1), Harumi (episode 135)	NTV	
1972	Kaiketsu Lion-Maru	Yu	Fuji TV	
1973	Tsuiseki		KTV	
1973	Lone Wolf and Cub		NTV	
1973	Sign wa V	Kaori Takagi	TBS	
1974	Wakai! Sensei		TBS	
1974	Inazuman F	Cyborg Miss One	NET	
1975	Himitsu Sentai Gorenger	Eagle Intelligence Worker 007 Yoko Kato	NET	
1977	Shin Goto Mono Chō		NTV	
1978	Spider-Man	Snake woman	Tokyo 12 Channel	
1979	Daitokai Part III	Hairdresser store manager Rie (episode 24)	NTV	
1979	Battle Fever J	Umbrella Monster	TV Asahi	
1979	Seibu Keisatsu		TV Asahi	
1980	Tantei Monogatari	Reiko Yoshida (episode 19)	NTV	
1980	Saketa Hoshi		MBS	
1980	Kareina Koroshi no Sanjūsō Kettō no Onna		TV Asahi	
1981	Taiyo Sentai Sun Vulcan	Omura-sensei	TV Asahi	
1981	Onihei Hankachō	Okei	TV Asahi	
1981	The Hangman		ABC	
1981	Pro Hunter	episode 15	NTV	
1982	Satsujin Nikki		TV Asahi	
1982	Tokusō Saizensen	Secretary Akiko Mizuki	TV Asahi	
1983	The Emperor's Snuff-Box		TV Asahi	
1983	Kari no Yadonaru o		YTV	
1984	Akai Gishō		YTV	
1989	Dr. Kuma hige		TV Asahi	
1990	The Keiji	Mari Tanimura	TV Asahi	
2004	Xmas Nante Daikirai		NTV	
2004	Suiyō Onna to Ai to Mystery		TV Tokyo	
2006	Yumeko Hinata Chōtei Iin Jiken-bo		Fuji TV	
2007	Babysitter no Kiken na Kōkishin	Ritsuko Nogami	TBS	

=== Other programmes ===
Title	Network
Ichimai no Shashin	Fuji TV

== Bibliography ==
Year	Title	Ref.
2004	Saigo no Kiss	
