= Rokurō Mochizuki =

Japanese film director (born 1957)

- Born: September 5, 1957 (age 68); Tokyo, Japan
- Occupation: Film director

Rokurō Mochizuki (望月六郎, Mochizuki Rokurō) is a Japanese film director who has worked in pink film, adult videos and mainstream cinema. He won the award for Best Director at the 19th Yokohama Film Festival for Onibi and A Yakuza in Love.

== Life and career ==
=== Early career - Pink film ===
Mochizuki was born in 1957 in the Shinjuku area of Tokyo. He attended Keio University in Tokyo but dropped out in his freshman year. After a round of bad-paying jobs, he eventually enrolled to study film at Tokyo's Image Forum. After graduating in the early 1980s, Mochizuki briefly worked at the Nikkatsu studio which was exclusively producing its Roman porno line of films at that time. Nikkatsu's fortunes were in decline, however, and Mochizuki was soon out of work. Mochizuki had been encouraged to write scripts by one of his teachers at Image Forum and in 1983, one of his screenplays was made into the pink film Virgin Rope Doll by Genji Nakamura for his Yū Pro company.

He continued working with Nakamura as a screenwriter and assistant director, including writing two gay-themed pink films, Beautiful Mystery (a parody of Yukio Mishima's right-wing activities) and Our Season (a.k.a. Male Season) starring Tōru Nakane. He made his debut as a director in 1985 with two pink films for Million Film, Real Performance Video: To Strip and Miss Masturbation: My Steamy Private Life. He also directed his first film for Nikkatsu in 1986, the melodramatic pink film Love Slave Doll: Make Me Come.

=== Adult videos (AV) ===
However, the pink film industry was in decline due to the rise of the adult video (AV) and Mochizuki decided to join the AV market, starting up his own production company, E-Staff Union (イースタッフユニオン). With the difficulties of surviving in the Japanese film industry of the time, Mochizuki went into the AV business primarily to make some money while directing films and although he expressed some doubts about his choice he has said that if he "wanted to keep making them [films], it was either the sexy stuff or nothing." In 1987, Mochizuki was directing AVs for Alice Japan, a company founded in 1986 as the adult video arm of Japan Home Video. He started the "Flashback" (フラッシュバック) series for Alice Japan in August 1987 and had produced Volume 30 in the series by December 1990 including one with the 1980s AV Idol Nao Saejima. In April 1990, he directed another early AV Idol, Yumika Hayashi, in the Alice Japan video The Contrary Soap Heaven 5 and he remained very active with Alice Japan through 1991.

=== Mainstream film ===
Mochizuki made his mainstream directorial debut in 1991 with the autobiographical Skinless Night produced by his own company E-Staff Union. The work revolves about a filmmaker from a background in pink film and now making AVs who is inspired by the discovery of an early student film of his to try to make an independent movie. The film, which showed more of the tedium of making adult videos than the glamor, was well received at festivals and the video distribution rights were picked up by Japan Home Video, the parent company of Alice Japan. With a new reputation as a mainstream director, Mochizuki filmed The Wicked Reporter for the Daiei studio in 1993. The commercial success of the film about a middle-aged boozing and gambling newspaperman (played by Eiji Okuda) led to two sequels in 1994 and 1996.

=== Yakuza films ===
In the last half of the 1990s, Mochizuki directed a series of yakuza movies that are considered his best work. Some of the films were a collaboration with novelist Yukio Yamanouchi who had once been a legal advisor to one of the yakuza syndicates. The first of the films, Another Lonely Hitman, about an old-time yakuza hitman who ends up battling his own gang, was released in 1995. The movie took the Best Film award at the 5th Japan Film Professional Awards and Mochizuki won the Best Director award. What critics consider his best film appeared in 1997, Onibi or The Fire Within, another study of an aging yakuza trying to go straight. Onibi won the Best Film award at the 19th Yokohama Film Festival and Mochizuki took the festival's Best Director award for this movie and his other 1997 film A Yakuza in Love. These were followed by the 1998 manga-based Mobster's Confession, a comical, cynical account of a small-time gangster and his girlfriend. By this time, Mochizuki had begun to attain an international reputation and the Rotterdam Film Festival held a ten-film retrospective on the director in 1998.

=== Declining fortunes ===
During the early 1990s, despite his entry into mainstream film, Mochizuki continued to produce hardcore pornographic videos as well, directing several entries in the Alice Japan series "Flash Paradise" (フラッシュパラダイス), working with actresses Rui Sakuragi, Riria Yoshikawa and Hitomi Shiraishi, among others. He also returned to his erotic film roots with his 2000 movie, Currency and Blonde, about a Japanese university lecturer and his sadomasochistic affair with his American lover. Critic Tom Mes sees this film, shot cheaply on video, as the start of a decline in the quality of Mochizuki's work. Much of his production in the 2000s was in the direct-to-video V-Cinema field, one exception being the 2000 pink film B-Grade Video Correspondent: AV Guy: Extraction Shop Ken, which won the 10th Best Film Award at the 2000 Pink Grand Prix. A more ambitious project was the 2004 mainstream film Kamachi, about a young poet and painter who died accidentally at the age of seventeen. His treatment, with hip-hop singer Shinya Taniuchi, who played the titular character, and actress Jun Fubuki, has been criticized as being superficial and romanticized.

After the loss of his production company and the cancellation of other projects, Mochizuki returned to directing adult videos as well, with works in the 2000s for Alice Japan and Max-A, some featuring AV idols Milk Ichigo, Ryōko Mitake and Akiho Yoshizawa.

=== Later career ===
Mochizuki's 2005 film for the Toei Company studio, Wet Red Thread concerned two former prostitutes played by Saki Takaoka and Rei Yoshii looking to start a new life. After a gap of three years, Mochizuki directed another film for Toei, the erotic feature Johnen: Love of Sada, an alternate look at Sada Abe, whose story had been previously treated in the pink film A Woman Called Sada Abe and more famously in Nagisa Oshima's In the Realm of the Senses. In Mochizuki's version, a young photographer becomes obsessed with the married Sada (played by actress-dancer-singer Aya Sugimoto) and his affair with her brings back memories of a former life together with her. Sugimoto had created a scandal by her unfettered sexuality when starring in the 2004 S&M cult film Flower and Snake and critic Mark Schilling compliments Mochizuki's style and casting for this film.

== Filmography - Director ==
Based on:

- Real Performance Video: To Strip (本番ビデオ 剥ぐ, Honban bideo: Hagu) (Jan. 1985) - pink film
- Miss Masturbation: My Steamy Private Life (ＯNANＩE嬢 みだらな私生活, Onanie jō: Midarana shiseikatsu) (Aug. 1985) - pink film
- Love Slave Doll: Make Me Come (愛奴人形 い・か・せ・て, Aido ningyō: I ka se te) (June 1986) - pink film
- Skinless Night (スキンレスナイト, Sukinresu naito) (Apr. 1991)
- The Wicked Reporter (極道記者, Gokudō kisha) (July 1993)
- The Wicked Reporter 2: Reincarnation of a Betting Ticket (極道記者2 馬券転生篇, Gokudō kisha 2: Baken tenshō) (Nov. 1994)
- Another Lonely Hitman (新・悲しきヒットマン, Shin kanashiki hittoman) (July 1995)
- The Dirty One (汚い奴, Kitanai Yatsu) (August 1995)
- Debeso (でべそ) (February 1996)
- The Wicked Reporter 3: The One That Got Away (新・極道記者 逃げ馬伝説, Shin Gokudō kisha: Nigema densetsu) (June 1996)
- Onibi (鬼火, Onibi) (Apr. 1997)
- A Yakuza in Love (恋極道, Koi gokudō) (Sept. 1997)
- Mobster's Confession (極道懺悔録, Gokudō zangeroku) (Feb. 1998)
- Minazuki (皆月, Minazuki) (Oct. 1999)
- Currency and Blonde (通貨と金髪, Tsūka to Kinpatsu) (Jan. 2000)
- B-Grade Video Correspondent: AV Guy: Extraction Shop Ken (B級ビデオ通信 AV野郎・抜かせ屋ケンちゃん, B-kyū bideo tsūshin: AV yarō: nukase-ya Ken-chan) (Aug. 2000) - pink film
- Kamachi (かまち) (Mar. 2004)
- Wet Red Thread (濡れた赫い糸, Nureta akai ito) (Aug. 2005)
- Johnen: Love of Sada (JOHNEN 定の愛, Johnen: Sada no ai) (May 2008)
