= Censorship in Japan =

Censorship in Japan has taken many forms throughout the history of the country. While Article 21 of the Constitution of Japan guarantees freedom of expression and prohibits formal censorship, effective censorship of obscene content does exist and is justified by the Article 175 of the Criminal Code of Japan. Historically, the law has been interpreted in different ways—as of 2003 it has been interpreted to mean that all pornography must be at least partly censored, and a few arrests have been made based on this law.

As of 2023, Japan is ranked 68th on the Press Freedom Index, up from 71st in the previous year. Reporters Without Borders has noted that issues concerning Japan include self-censorship among its journalists, as well as the exclusion of freelancers and foreign reporters in government events and interviews, fueling doubts about editorial independence. In 2022, an "online insults" law was introduced that would regulate the kind of speech made in the online public sphere.

== History ==
=== Tokugawa/Edo Period ===
As publishing became more popular in the Edo Period, the Tokugawa shogunate began to turn to censorship. During this period, the shogunate, or military government, had a constant policy to censor anything deemed as indecent by the government. Initial targets included Christianity, criticism of the shogunate, and information on the activities of the Tokugawa clan. With the Kansei Reforms, any material deemed to be disturbing the traditional way of life, as well as luxury publications, came under scrutiny. Under the Tempō Reforms, printing blocks of erotic literature, as well as the novels of Tamenaga Shunsui and Tanehiko Ryūtei were among those seized.

Their early bans focused on Christian books, military books (gunsho), mainly as a way to restrict regional daimyō from using Christianity as a political ideology and challenge the bakufu's new rule while imposing their moral authority. As military and political instability settled, the shogunate turned their gaze on social unrest. They were noting an increase in civil disobedience and satirical criticism using literature and theater coming from ordinary people. An edict for publications guidelines were issued on Kyoho 7 (1722)/11 with an outline of themes that were banned. In addition to literature, the Shogunate also placed limitations on kabuki theater actors. The shogunate prohibited women and children from appearing in plays, but this law was often ignored by theater houses. These new laws resulted in the rise of male actors who would specialize in female roles called onnagata.

=== Meiji Period and the Pacific War ===
After the Meiji Restoration in 1868, which marked a major political shift in Japan, the government began heavy censorship of Western ideas, pornography and any political writings critical of the Emperor of Japan and government, wanting to control the spread of information. Censorship of materials increased from this point, often using ongoing wars to increase police penalties. Episodes of newspaper suppression and imprisonment of editors occurred in 1868, 1876 and 1887. Freedom of speech and the press was heavily restricted through vaguely worded laws.

In 1930, the death penalty was added to the list of punishments deemed acceptable for certain violations. This continued, eventually to the Information and Propaganda Department (情報部, Jōhōbu) being elevated to the Information Bureau (情報局, Jōhō Kyoku) in 1940, which consolidated the previously separate information departments from the Army, Navy and Foreign Ministry under the aegis of the Home Ministry. The new Bureau had complete control over all news, advertising and public events. The following year revision of the National Mobilization Law (国家総動員法, Kokka Sōdōin Hō) eliminated freedom of the press entirely, doing things such as forcing papers in each prefecture to either merge into one paper or cease publication, with all articles by the paper having to be screened by government censors before they could be published.

=== Occupation of Japan ===
After the surrender of Japan in 1945, the Supreme Commander of the Allied Powers abolished all forms of censorship and controls on freedom of speech. Article 21 of the Constitution of Japan was later integrated in 1947 to guarantee that the Japanese had the freedom to associate with each other and express their thoughts freely. However, press censorship remained a reality during the occupation of Japan, especially in matters of pornography, and in political matters deemed subversive by the American government. Publications submitted by the press were monitored for criticisms about democracy or the problems such as starvation the Japanese citizens experienced during the occupation in the form of regulations set by The Press Code of 1945.

Censorship of certain events related to the Allied forces left various groups of Japanese citizens to be subjected to discrimination by their peers. Hibakusha experienced life-altering physical changes as a result of the radiation they were exposed to and the lack of press explaining the effects of radiation poisoning made it difficult for Hibakusha to fit in. Unable to speak out against the results of the atomic bombs and to assimilate with other Japanese citizens, most Hibakusha had to live in isolation within the homes of their family.

The three organizations established by the Supreme Commander of the Allied Powers and who were tasked with upholding press censorship were the Civil Communications Section (CCS), the Civil Censorship Detachment (CCD), and the Civil Information and Education Section (CIE). The CCS focused on monitoring what was being broadcast to the Japanese people while the CCD monitored printed and filmed works to ensure that no form of media was spreading messages against democracy. The CIE on the other hand, was primarily used to educate Japanese publishers and producers on how to integrate prodemocratic values into their publications to boost support for the new government.

According to Donald Keene:

Not only did Occupation censorship forbid criticism of the United States or other Allied nations, but the mention of censorship itself was forbidden. This means, as Donald Keene observes, that for some producers of texts "the Occupation censorship was even more exasperating than Japanese military censorship had been because it insisted that all traces of censorship be concealed. This meant that articles had to be rewritten in full, rather than merely submitting XXs for the offending phrases".

—Dawn to the West

== Pornographic censorship ==
The sale and distribution of pornography in Japan is restricted under Article 175 of the Criminal Code (1907), which states the following:

A person who distributes, sells or displays in public an obscene document, drawing or other objects shall be punished by imprisonment with work for not more than 2 years, a fine of not more than ¥2,500,000 or a petty fine. The same shall apply to a person who possesses the same for the purpose of sale.

The article was amended in 2011 to include "recording media containing [obscene] electronic or magnetic records," as well as materials distributed by electronic means.

The definition of "obscenity," which is absent from the text of the code itself, has developed through a series of judicial decisions. In the 1957 Chatterley Case, the Supreme Court of Japan upheld the convictions of translator Sei Itō and editor Kyujiro Koyama, accused of violating the law with their 1950 publication of D. H. Lawrence's erotic novel Lady Chatterley's Lover. In the court's opinion, it cited a three-part test for obscenity previously established by the Supreme Court of Judicature in 1928; under this test, a work is considered obscene if it "arouses and stimulates sexual desire, offends a common sense of modesty or shame, and violates proper concepts of sexual morality". Due to this legal interpretation, the majority of pornography produced in Japan undergoes self-censorship; the primary means are digital mosaics and/or censor bars placed over genitalia.

The first film after World War II to be prosecuted on obscenity charges was Black Snow, a 1965 pink film directed by Tetsuji Takechi and produced by Nikkatsu. The politically and sexually explicit film, which depicts the lives of prostitutes on the outskirts of a US military base in Tokyo, was ruled as "not obscene" by the Tokyo District Court in 1966. The lower court held that the defendants–Takechi and Nikkatsu distributor chief Satoru Murakami–were not culpable because the film had successfully passed Eirin, Japan's self-regulating movie regulator. The Tokyo High Court upheld the ruling in 1969, having deemed that the film was obscene but acquitted the pair on the basis of the approval the film had received from Eirin. The rulings were followed in 1972 by a series of prosecutions against Nikkatsu's Roman Porno film series, which similarly ended in acquittals of Nikkatsu employees in 1978 and 1980 on the basis of Eirin approvals.

In January 2004, Yūji Suwa, Motonori Kishi, and Kōichi Takada were prosecuted for producing and distributing the hentai manga anthology Misshitsu, in the first manga-related obscenity trial in Japan. Police reports found the depictions of "genitalia and scenes of sexual intercourse" within the manga to have been "drawn in detail and realistically", and that the censor bars meant to obscure genitalia and sexual penetration were "less conservative" than usual. Suwa and Takada pled guilty and were fined ¥500,000 each (about US$4,700), with Kishi receiving a one-year suspended prison sentence. After appealing to the Tokyo High Court, Kishi's sentence was reduced to a 1.5 million yen fine (about US$13,750). He then appealed the case to the Supreme Court, arguing that Article 175 violated Article 21 of the Constitution of Japan and its protection of freedom of expression. In its 2007 decision, the Court upheld the guilty verdict, concluding that Misshitsu satisfied the three-part obscenity test and was therefore subject to restriction. After the convictions of Kishi and Suwa, a number of retail bookstores in Japan removed their adults-only section, a phenomenon attributed to the chilling effect of the outcome.

In July 2013, three people related to Core Magazine, a Japanese publishing company focused on adult material, were arrested for selling "obscene images" with "insufficient censoring." They later pled guilty in December.

== Internet censorship ==
Internet censorship in Japan generally focuses on pornography and controversial political material especially in regards to Japanese history during the Empire of Japan.

In 2022, Japan introduced a law to revise its Penal Code that would mandate a jail time for up to a year and a larger fine for making "online insults". Previously, insult charges apply when it is established that an "individual has insulted another in the public sphere to damage their social reputation". The penalty applied to the crime under the pre-revised law were "detention for less than 30 days" or "a fine of less than 10,000 yen.

In February 2023, the proposal to introduce an internet real-name system, similar to China's Internet real-name system, was announced by Digital Minister Taro Kono. He said: "If we first use the phone number card for authentication when creating accounts for various services such as social networking services, we can ensure that age restrictions are strictly observed, so I think the phone number card will be useful in this area as well." Digital Minister Kono stated that "some unsolicited videos are clearly criminal acts, and in such cases, people must be made aware of the fact that they are crimes", and that "putting videos on the Internet for fun will affect people's lives for a long time". He also stated that it is necessary to cooperate with the Ministry of Education, Culture, Sports, Science and Technology (MEXT), and others to provide guidance in the field of education in order to improve internet literacy.

== Crime censorship ==
Legal, institutional, and self-imposed mechanisms in Japan restrict the publication or disclosure of information relating to crime, criminal suspects, executions, and the criminal justice system, according to press-freedom organizations, amnesty international, and journalists who have documented the practice.

=== Juvenile offenders ===
Article 61 of Japan's Juvenile Law, enacted in 1948, states that no article or photograph "of a juvenile, who has been referred to a family court for trial, or a person, who has been charged with a crime committed as a juvenile shall be published in a newspaper or other publication" if it would identify that person by name, age, occupation, address, or appearance. Legal scholarship describes the law's purpose as ensuring "the rehabilitation of the juvenile will not be hindered, and no one in the public will recognize him" after the fact. The law was tested in a widely covered 2015 Kawasaki case, in which weekly magazine Shūkan Shinchō published the name and photograph of an 18-year-old ringleader convicted in the killing of 13-year-old Uemura Ryōta, an act Nippon.com's coverage describes explicitly as "in violation of Article 61," with the magazine's editors saying the decision followed consideration of the crime's brutality and social impact. Japan's Supreme Court in 2003 further defined what constitutes prohibited "identifying reporting" (suichi hōdō) under the statute. The identity-suppression rule was partially lifted only in April 2022, when an amendment permitted real-name reporting of offenders aged 18–19 who are formally charged. Research on the change notes that prior to the amendment, "information on juvenile offenders has been rigidly controlled, and their anonymity has been strictly protected," and that "more than 90% of Japanese citizens support the ban" that had been in place.

=== Executions and the death penalty ===
Japan carries out executions by hanging under conditions that human-rights organizations and some scholars describe as unusually secretive even compared to other retentionist states. Amnesty International states that "executions in Japan are shrouded in secrecy, with prisoners typically given only a few hours' notice and their families usually notified about the execution only after it has taken place," and that "the secrecy that continues to surround the notification of executions make the use of this punishment in Japan additionally cruel." No media coverage of the execution process itself is permitted. Academic legal research published in Criminal Law Forum states that "the secrecy and silence that surround capital punishment are taken to extremes not seen in other nations," and that Japan "remains an outlier with respect to openness" even as other death-penalty jurisdictions have grown more secretive themselves. Death-row inmates are, according to Amnesty International, "prohibited from contacting the media or politicians," and any communication with permitted visitors is "strictly controlled and monitored." Attorney Kyoji Mizutani, representing death-row inmates, told a press conference at the Foreign Correspondents' Club of Japan that "the Japanese government has been keeping the facts about executions hidden from public view and avoiding debate on the matter," displaying what reporting described as "an almost fully redacted document" he had received in response to an information request. The Death Penalty Project has stated that Japan "continues to withhold most details surrounding executions" even as it cites public-opinion survey figures to justify retaining the practice.

=== Police press clubs (kisha clubs) ===
Japan's system of kisha clubs, exclusive press associations attached to government ministries, police departments, and other institutions, is repeatedly identified by press-freedom monitors as a mechanism that restricts and shapes crime and police reporting specifically. Freedom House's Freedom on the Net report states that the kisha club system "contributes to a culture of self-censorship within the media," and that access-limiting tactics are "frequently applied on the management of mainstream media, especially when institutions report on corruption" among other sensitive subjects. The U.S. State Department's human rights report on Japan states that "domestic and international observers continued to express concerns that the system of kisha (reporter) clubs attached to government agencies may encourage self-censorship." Clubs attached to police departments have been shown to actively restrict information during major crime stories. Coverage of the 2001 Osaka school massacre noted that "reporters that were not part of the local police's press club were denied access to the primary debriefings," receiving only "a short debriefing" after club members had already been informed. Investigative journalist Yu Terasawa, who has specialized for two decades in covering police corruption, told the Committee to Protect Journalists that kisha club members "print what they're told, often unattributed, as a condition of continued access to those in power," and described the consequence for reporters who diverge from this arrangement. Kisha clubs also formalize direct reporting restrictions through what are called "blackboard agreements" (kokuban kyōtei), arrangements, according to Wikipedia's source entry on this subject, sometimes made "based on a request by the police, to protect the victims in cases such as kidnappings."

== See also ==
- Computer Entertainment Rating Organization—a Japanese rating organization for video games
- Constitution of Japan § Individual rights
- Eirin—the Japanese film rating organization
- Japanese history textbook controversies
- Kotobagari—self-censorship and euphemisms
- Kisha club—restrictive journalist clubs that allows only established news organisations to access government events and to interview officials
- Nanjing Massacre denial
- Nihon Ethics of Video Association (NEVA)—a Japanese rating organization for videos
- Tokyo Metropolitan Ordinance Regarding the Healthy Development of Youths—the Tokyo law that regulates young people's access to "harmful" publications
- Uyoku dantai ("right wing groups")
