= Bleep censor =

Beep used to censor profanity

A 1-kilohertz tone

A bleep censor is the replacement of a profanity and classified information with a bleep sound, usually a 1-kilohertz sine wave. It is used on public television and radio.

== History and usages ==
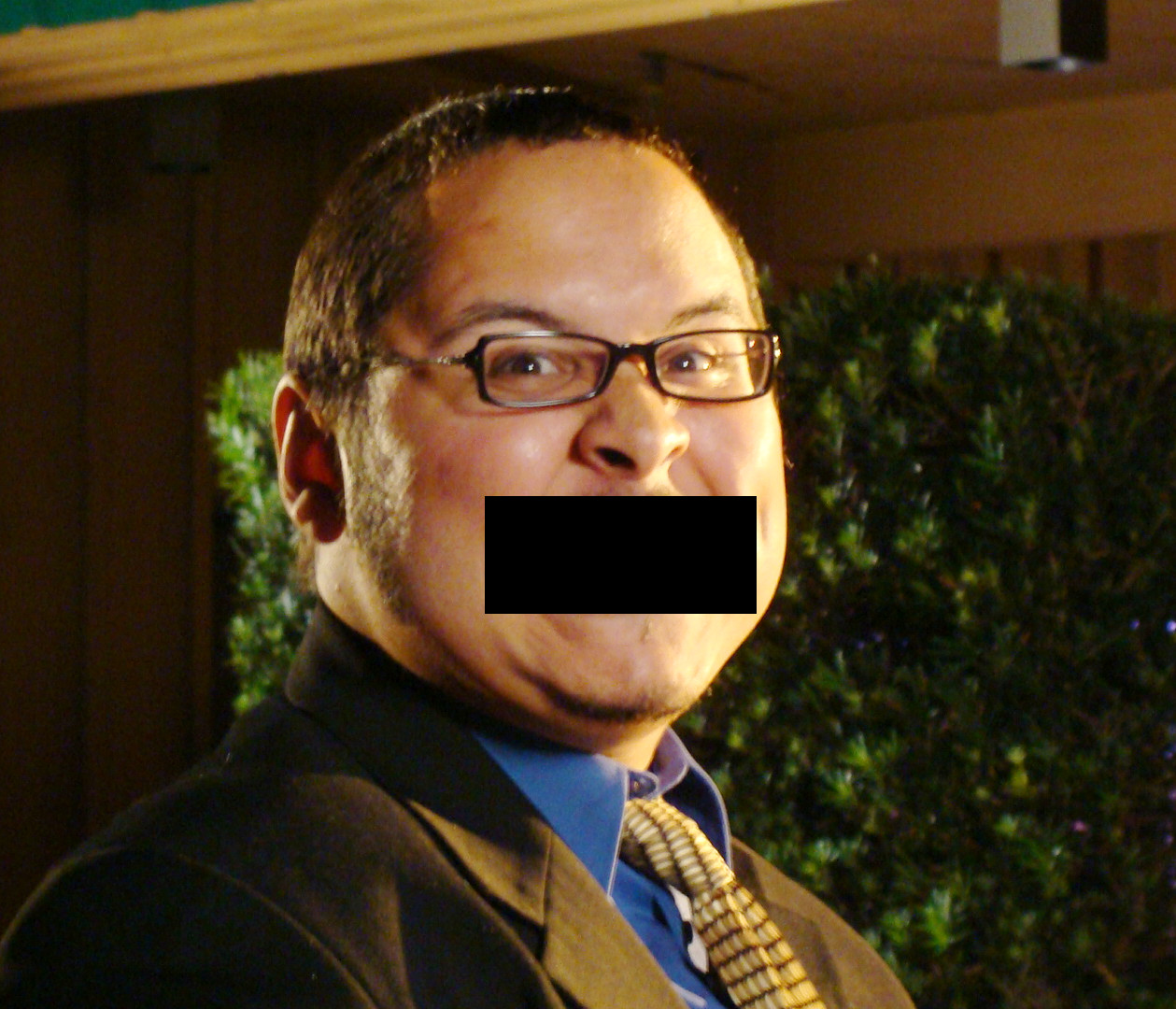
Censor bars may be used along with the bleeps to prevent the audience from lip reading the swearer's words.

Bleeping has been used as a standard since the early 20th century as a means of censoring both TV and radio programs to remove inappropriate content not deemed suitable for "family", "daytime", "broadcasting", or "international" viewing, as well as sensitive classified information for security. The bleep censor is a software module, manually operated by a broadcast technician. A bleep is sometimes accompanied by a digital blur, pixelization, or a box over the speaker's mouth in cases where the removed speech may still be easily understood by lip reading.

On closed caption subtitling, bleeped words are represented by [bleep] or a similar indicator, or through the use of hyphens (e.g. abbreviations of the word fuck like f—k f---), a series of X's, or asterisks and other non-letter symbols known as grawlixes (e.g., ****, f**k, f%@$), remaining faithful to the audio track. Occasionally, bleeping is not reflected in the captions, allowing the unedited dialogue to be read. In 2019 Netflix was criticized for bowdlerizing bleeped dialogue in its captions.

Bleeping is mostly used in unscripted broadcasts, such as documentaries, radio features, and panel games. In scripted shows, inappropriate dialogue can be avoided, or corrected in a retake.

Bleeps may be used to conceal personally-identifying information such as ages, surnames, addresses, phone numbers, and attempts to advertise a personal business without advanced or appropriate notice. This can be seen for subjects arrested in documentary series such as Traffic Cops or COPS.

Bleeping is commonly used in English-language, Russian-language, Filipino-language and Japanese-language broadcasting, and also within broadcasting in ex-Eastern Bloc countries like Poland, Hungary, Romania, Baltic states and most post-Soviet states. Some countries take a more liberal attitude towards swearing, while others are less inclined to use strong profanities in front of a camera in the first place. For example, in Norway, Sweden, Germany, Denmark and the Netherlands, a bleep censor is not used as people from these countries swear more freely than those in English-speaking countries or more conservative countries. Instead, the bleep censor on the television in these countries is mostly used for censoring out any sensitive information, rather than censoring out profanity, as was the case in the Dutch investigative television program Peter R. de Vries: Crime Reporter, which aired from 1995 to 2012.

On live television airings, broadcasters prefer to mute the audio to censor profanity instead of bleeping over it. This was already the case on March 27, 2022, when the United States broadcaster ABC muted the audio during a live broadcast of the Oscars after Will Smith slapped Chris Rock to which Rock responded, "Will Smith just smacked the shit out of me!", and Smith shouted, "Keep my wife's name out your fucking mouth!". Nevertheless, the complete verbal exchange between Rock and Smith was broadcast uncensored which became viral in social media and in other countries like the United Kingdom, Japan, China, Australia, and Argentina.

Bleeping also frequently occurs in many videos on the Internet. YouTube videos often have profanity being bleeped, muted, or with a sound effect that is used as YouTube policy that specifies that videos containing profanities without bleeps, mutes, or sound effects may be "demonetized" or stripped of ads. Beginning in 2019, the bleep censor began to be more often used for censoring out words related to sensitive and contentious topics to evade algorithmic censorship online, especially on Meta and TikTok platforms.

Bleeping in the final cut of a film is rare, although television broadcasters may use a bleep censor to comply with local broadcast laws, such as the watershed.

=== Comic effect ===
In the case of scripted comedies, bleeping may be used for humorous purposes, and other sound effects may be substituted for the bleep tone for comical effect; examples of this include a slide whistle, a baby cooing, dolphin noises, or the "boing" of a spring. Some scripted comedies purposely incorporate bleeping for comedic purposes; for example, profanity in the American sitcom Reno 911! is always bleeped as the show is presented in a mockumentary style, while a recurring joke used in sketches by Australian comedy group Aunty Donna features the bleep appearing slightly too late, resulting in the original profanity being clearly heard before it is immediately followed by a bleep that either serves no purpose or interrupts what the speaker was saying after they had already used profanity. In Jimmy Kimmel Live! Thursday-night segment named "This Week In Unnecessary Censorship", the bleep censor is used for comedic effect in cases when an actual expletive is not present to make them appear inappropriate or profane by editing clips from television programs, news, speeches, interviews, and sometimes animated series and movies, as well as in fan-made online videos that resemble the "Unnecessary Censorship" format. Additionally, Jimmy Kimmel's late-night show has not regularly aired live since April 23, 2004, when censors were unable to properly bleep censor a barrage of swearing from actor Thomas Jane.

== Regulations ==
=== Advertising in the United Kingdom ===
Under the Ofcom guidelines, television and radio commercials are not allowed to use bleeps to obscure swearing under BACC/CAP guidelines. However, this does not apply to program trailers or cinema advertisements and "fuck" is bleeped out of two cinema advertisements for Johnny Vaughan's Capital FM show and the cinema advertisement for the Family Guy season 5 DVD. An advert for esure insurance released in October 2007 uses the censor bleep, as well as a black star placed over the speaker's mouth, to conceal the name of a competitor company the speaker said she used to use. The Comedy Central advert for South Park: Bigger, Longer & Uncut had a version of "Kyle's Mom's a Bitch" where vulgarities were bleeped out, though the movie itself did not have censorship, and was given a 15 rating.

A Barnardo's ad, released in summer 2007, has two versions: one where a boy can be heard saying "fuck off" four times which is restricted to "18" rated cinema screenings, and one where a censor bleep sound obscures the profanity which is still restricted to "15" and "18" rated films. Neither is permitted on UK television.

Trailers for programs containing swearing are usually bleeped until well after the watershed, and it is very rare for any trailer to use the most severe swear words uncensored.

=== United States ===
In the United States, the Federal Communications Commission has the power to regulate indecent broadcasts. However, the FCC does not actively monitor television broadcasts for indecency violations, nor does it keep a record of television broadcasts. Reports must be documented exclusively by the public and submitted in written form, whether by traditional letter or e-mail.

The FCC is allowed to enforce indecency laws during 6 a.m. – 10 p.m. local time. In addition, for network broadcasts, offensive material seen during watershed in one time zone may be subject to fines and prosecution for stations in earlier time zones: for instance, a program with offensive content broadcast at 10 p.m. Eastern Time/Mountain resulted in many stations being fined because of this detail. It falls out of watershed at 9 p.m. Central Time/Pacific Time. To compensate, a channel may only air uncensored material after 1 a.m. Eastern Time so that the broadcast is in watershed in the contiguous United States. For example, Comedy Central only airs uncensored after 1 a.m. so that Eastern Time, Central Time, Mountain Time, and Pacific Time all have it past 10 p.m.

Cable and satellite channels are subject to regulations on what the FCC considers "obscenity", but are exempt from the FCC's "indecency" and "profanity" regulations, though many police themselves, mainly to appeal to advertisers who would be averse to placing their ads on their programs.

Some television and cinematic productions work around the requirement of a censor bleep by writing dialogue in a language that the intended audience is unlikely to understand (for example, Joss Whedon's Firefly used untranslated Chinese curses to avoid being "bleeped", while the Star Trek: The Next Generation episodes "The Last Outpost" and "Elementary, Dear Data" have the character of Captain Jean-Luc Picard utter the French obscenity, merde, which is equivalent to "shit" in English.).

=== Russia ===
In Russia, the use of a bleep censor on television and radio broadcasting, and movies is very commonplace due to the laws that do not allow the use of foul language without giving a list of banned words, as mass media may face fines. On April 8, 2013, amendments were adopted to the law regulating the activities of the media in Russia, which prohibited the "use of obscene language", i.e. mat in Russian mass media.

== See also ==
- Censor bars, visual
- Expurgation
- Family Viewing Hour
- Fogging (censorship)
- Minced oath
- Pixelization
- Radio edit
- Sanitization (classified information)
- Self-censorship
- Tape delay (broadcasting)
- "Beep" (song), a 2006 song by The Pussycat Dolls which incorporates bleeps; see also the 2010 3OH!3 song "Touchin' on My"
- Government Hooker, a 2011 song by Lady Gaga which uses bleeps for the outro
- "I Bet You They Won't Play This Song on the Radio", a song by Eric Idle that uses comic sound effects for many bleeps
- The Morning Show with Mike and Juliet, an American talk show that, in 2008, gained notoriety for using a variation of the bleep censor dubbed a "bleep photo"
- Seven dirty words
