= Tetsuji Takechi =

Japanese theatre and film director (1912–1988)

- Takechi at a "Takechi Kabuki" performance (between 1945 and 1955)
- Born: Tetsuji Kawaguchi; 10 December 1912; Osaka, Japan
- Died: 26 July 1988 (aged 75)
- Education: Kyoto National University
- Occupations: Kabuki director, theorist and critic; theatre director; film director; author; actor
- Years active: 1945–1987

Tetsuji Takechi (武智 鉄二, Takechi Tetsuji; 10 December 1912 – 26 July 1988) was a Japanese theatrical and film director, critic, and author. First coming to prominence for his theatrical criticism, in the 1940s and 1950s he produced influential and popular experimental kabuki plays. Beginning in the mid-1950s, he continued his innovative theatrical work in noh, kyōgen and modern theater. In late 1956 and early 1957 he hosted a popular TV program, The Tetsuji Takechi Hour, which featured his reinterpretations of Japanese stage classics.

In the 1960s, Takechi entered the film industry by producing controversial soft-core theatrical pornography. His 1964 film Daydream was the first big-budget, mainstream pink film released in Japan. After the release of his 1965 film Black Snow, the government arrested him on indecency charges. The trial became a public battle over censorship between Japan's intellectuals and the government. Takechi won the lawsuit, enabling the wave of softcore pink films which dominated Japan's domestic cinema during the 1960s and 1970s. In the later 1960s, Takechi produced three more pink films.

Takechi did not work in film during most of the 1970s. In the 1980s, he remade Daydream twice, starring actress Kyōko Aizome in both films. The first Daydream remake (1981) is considered the first theatrical hardcore pornographic film in Japan. Though Takechi is largely unknown in Japan today, he was influential in both the cinema and the theater during his lifetime, and his innovations in kabuki were felt for decades. He also helped shape the future of the pink film in Japan through his battles against governmental censorship, earning him the titles, "The Father of Pink" and "The Father of Japanese Porn."

== Life and career ==
=== Early life ===
Tetsuji Takechi was born Tetsuji Kawaguchi in Osaka on 10 December 1912 to a family headed by a wealthy industrialist. He studied economics at Kyoto National University and graduated in 1936. Takechi first became known for his criticism and theoretical writings on the theater. In 1939 he began publishing a journal, Stage Review in which he printed his writings on the theater. In the early 1940s, he began publishing collections of these writings in book form. When World War II came to an end, Takechi used his inheritance from his father to establish a theatrical troupe. Under his direction, the Takechi Kabuki, as the group was known, put Takechi's theatrical ideas into practise by giving innovative and popular performances of kabuki classics in Osaka from 1945 to 1955.

=== Takechi Kabuki ===
The immediate post-World War II era was a difficult time for kabuki. Besides the devastation caused to major Japanese cities as a result of the war, the popular trend was to reject the styles and thoughts of the past, kabuki among them. Also, during the early years of the Allied Occupation of Japan, the occupying authorities banned kabuki as feudalistic and detrimental to the public morals, though by 1947 this ban was lifted. Other traditional forms of theater, such as noh and bunraku, seen as less flamboyant and violent than kabuki, received less attention from Occupation censors. Kabuki scholars credit Takechi's innovative productions of the kabuki classics with bringing about a rebirth of interest in the kabuki in the Kansai region after this low point in kabuki history. Takechi revitalized kabuki by reaching out to the other theatrical forms—noh, kyōgen, and the modern theater and dance—for new ideas and collaboration. He broke through long-established barriers which existed between these theatrical forms, and even between kabuki schools, to create an energetic new form of kabuki. Despite his maverick nature, Takechi gave great attention to the classic kabuki texts, and emphasized to his actors the need to inhabit the roles they played. His approach to a new interpretation of the old texts was to "psychologize" them. By bringing out the psychology already present in the classic texts, Takechi felt that actors could interpret their roles with vitality and energy which he felt was lacking in contemporary performances. Of the many popular young stars of the kabuki who performed under Takechi, Nakamura Ganjiro III (born 1931) was the leading figure. At first known as Nakamura Senjaku, this period in Osaka kabuki became known as the "Age of Senjaku" in his honor.

=== Theater work after Takechi Kabuki ===
Takechi's innovations in kabuki brought him to the attention of the Shigeyama family, a longtime major force in comic kyōgen plays. With the Shigeyamas, Takechi created and directed the kyōgen, Susugigawa (The Washing River), in 1953. Based on a medieval French farce, this play became the first new kyōgen to enter the traditional repertoire in a century. Takechi saw in kyōgen a more direct link to a native Japanese folk theatrical tradition, and through the kyōgen wanted to link these folk traditions with the modern theater. As a Western analogy of his intentions, Takechi pointed to the works of Ibsen and Tennessee Williams which had their roots in the classical theater of Racine, Molière and Shakespeare.

In 1954, Takechi followed Susugigawa with a noh-kyōgen version of Junji Kinoshita's Yūzuru. Yūzuru is one of the most successful Japanese post-World War II plays, having received over a thousand performances at schools and theaters both within Japan and internationally since its debut in 1949. Composer Ikuma Dan wrote an opera version of the play in 1952. Since its premiere, Dan's opera has been performed more than 550 times, making it possibly the most popular opera written in Japanese. Dan was recruited to write the original music for Takechi's production of the play. Dan combined the noh-style solo vocal lines with a Western orchestra and chorus. On the same program as Yūzuru was another Takechi-directed kyōgen, Higashi wa Higashi (East is East), a parody of the kyōgen style. Among the innovations Takechi made in this play was the inclusion of a former Takarazuka actress in the usually all-male kyōgen cast. In the ultra-conservative noh and kyōgen communities, simply appearing in a rival school's production could result in an actor's excommunication from the profession. Because of the public attention drawn through Takechi's relentless publicity work and communication with the media, punitive actions against actors who worked with Takechi were avoided.

Besides his work as a theatrical theorist and director, Takechi occasionally appeared in acting roles on the stage and screen. In his series of essays, Chronicles of My Life in the 20th Century, American author and translator of Japanese literature, Donald Keene mentions his own study of kyōgen at this time. In 1956, Keene appeared in a performance of the kyōgen play Chidori with Takechi in the role of the sake shop owner, before an audience including such prominent authors as Tanizaki, Yasunari Kawabata and Yukio Mishima.

Writing that "every form of art" should be popular with the public, Takechi next sought to rejuvenate noh in a similar manner with which he had kabuki and kyōgen. He worked with the avant-garde group Jikken Kōbō (Experimental Workshop), which had been founded by composers Tōru Takemitsu, Jōji Yuasa and other artists in 1951. One of Takechi's more notable productions with the group was a 1955 noh version of Schoenberg's Pierrot Lunaire (1912).

In October 1955 he directed Mishima's modern noh play, The Damask Drum in a theater-in-the-round production at Osaka's Sankei Hall. Mishima, dubious of Takechi's experimental approach to classical theater, later commented that he felt like a father allowing a disreputable plastic surgeon to operate on his child. Also at Sankei Hall, Takechi directed Mishima's Sotoba Komachi, set as an opera by composer Mareo Ishiketa, in 1956.

The controversy created by Takechi's experiments with noh made international headlines in 1956. The International News Service reported that Takechi had introduced elements of burlesque and striptease into the slow, stylised artform. Confirming that Takechi's methods did make the artform popular, his "Burlesque Noh" productions at Tokyo's Nichigeki Music Hall played to a consistently full house. Again, however, the leaders of the conservative Noh Society of Tokyo threatened any performer who participated in Takechi's productions with excommunication.

From 4 December 1956 to 26 February 1957, Takechi served as the host of the Nippon Television program, The Tetsuji Takechi Hour. The show featured the Takechi Kabuki's interpretations of such Japanese stage classics as Chūshingura, and was also known for pushing the limits of the coverage of sexual subjects on television for its time. Takechi directed two more kabuki performances for the Nissei Theater in Tokyo, not long after it was opened in 1963. Though these would be his last kabuki productions, Takechi's influence on the art form continued to be felt for decades after his departure for the cinema.

=== Entrance into the cinema ===
In the early 1960s, Takechi turned from the stage to the cinema. Though the mainstream film industry considered Takechi an amateur and an outsider, he would continue to produce ground-breaking films sporadically for the rest of his life. Some of the innovations and trends in Japanese erotic cinema which Takechi's films pioneered include big-budgets and releases, literary and artistic aspirations, fogging, political themes, and theatrical hardcore.

Takechi ran afoul of the government throughout his film career. The Weissers, in their Japanese Cinema Encyclopedia: The Sex Films, even characterize Takechi's entire film career as "a personal war with Eirin" (the Japanese film-rating board). Turning from the Edo period art form of kabuki to another popular Edo period form of expression, pornography, Takechi decided to enter the film industry through the new genre of low-budget, independent softcore sex-films that were becoming popular in Japan. These films were called eroductions at this time, but are now more commonly referred to as pink films.

Takechi's first film was A Night in Japan: Woman, Woman, Woman Story (Nihon no yoru: Onna onna onna monogatari, 1963), a sex-documentary in the mondo style popular at the time. The film focused on the women of Japan's night life and included scenes of a nude noh performance, strippers, and geisha. Produced independently, Shochiku studios distributed the film, allowing it an international audience. It was released in West Germany on 6 March 1964 as Frauen unter nackter Sonne (alle Frauen Japans). In the U.S., it opened in Los Angeles under the title Women... Oh, Women! on 18 September 1964. Later that year, Takechi appeared in an acting role in director Kaneto Shindō's Mother (1963).

=== Daydream (1964) ===
The first Japanese mainstream film with nudity was Seijun Suzuki's Gate of Flesh (1964), and Takechi made the first big-budget, mainstream pink film, Daydream (白日夢), the same year. Like Women... Oh, Women!, Daydream was produced independently but Shochiku studios distributed the film. This time, the studio gave Takechi's film a major publicity campaign. Based on a 1926 short story by Jun'ichirō Tanizaki, the film was a black comedy involving a series of sex scenes imagined by an artist under anesthesia in a dentist's office. After being drugged, the artist watches helplessly from the other side of a window as the dentist tortures and performs a series of sexual acts on a female patient.

Though modest in comparison with pink films which would come soon after, Daydream did contain female nudity. The government refused to allow one controversial shot, which gave a brief glimpse of pubic hair. Takechi fought the government's censorship of this shot, but lost. When the censors obscured the offending hair with a fuzzy white dot, Daydream became the first film in Japanese cinema to undergo "fogging", a common element in Japanese erotic cinema for decades to come.

Despite the governmental tampering, Daydream became a major success in Japan, and was screened at the Venice Film Festival in September 1964. The film was released in the U.S. later the same year, and in 1966 Joseph Green, director of the cult film The Brain that Wouldn't Die (1962), re-released Daydream in the U.S. with new American footage.

Takechi's third film, The Dream of the Red Chamber or Crimson Dream (Kokeimu（紅閨夢）, 1964), was released less than two months after Daydream. Based on two short stories, "Kasanka Mangansui no Yume" and "Yanagiyu no Jiken" by Jun'ichirō Tanizaki, the film depicts the lurid and violently erotic dreams of a writer, his wife and his sister, after having spent a night out drinking and visiting sex shows. The Dream of the Red Chamber underwent extensive censorship before the government would allow it to be released. About 20% of the film's original content was cut by Eirin, rendering the film virtually incoherent, and this footage is now considered lost.

=== Black Snow (1965) ===
Takechi's Daydream had been considered a national embarrassment by the Japanese government because of its highly publicized release while the world was focused on the country for the 1964 Tokyo Olympics. Takechi's third film had suffered heavily from the governmental censorship, yet no legal action had been taken. Takechi's fourth film, the Nikkatsu-produced Black Snow (1965), was even more controversial than his previous work. David Desser credits Black Snow with bringing a political theme to the pink film. Politics would be featured in many later films in the pink genre, most notably those of Kōji Wakamatsu.

The story of Black Snow concerns a young man whose mother serves the U.S. military at Yokota Air Base as a prostitute. Impotent unless making love with a loaded gun, the young man shoots an American G.I., and is then shot down by U.S. soldiers. The film contained multiple scenes of sexual intercourse, and a lengthy scene of a nude woman running outside Yokota Air Base. However, more than the sex and nudity, it was the political nature of the film which attracted governmental action. Released at a time of widespread demonstration against the renewal of the U.S. Security Treaty, Black Snow had a clear anti-American theme. Film critic Tadao Sato says that the film uses sex to make a political statement. "In Black Snow... the powerless position of Japan vis-a-vis America, and of the Japanese populace in relation to its rulers is represented by the outraged Japanese women and the G.I. rapists."

Other critics accused the film of racism and ultra-nationalism. Jasper Sharp writes that though Takechi's films did criticize Japanese society, a theme they share with pink films, Takechi identified the problem as coming from foreign influences, rather than from within. This marks him as a reactionary rather than a revolutionary, as were many pink film directors. Takechi himself claimed to be a minzoku shugisha, or "ethnic nationalist", throughout his life. Buruma points out that this ideological affiliation contains a strong racial aspect, and notes that the G.I. the main character murders in Black Snow is African American. Buruma comments further, "This, incidentally, has become a standard cliche: whenever G.I.s are shown in Japanese porno films, invariably in the act of outrageously raping Japanese maidens, they are very often blacks to make the outrage seem even worse."

Though the government had accused earlier films of obscenity, Black Snow became the first film after World War II to be prosecuted by the government on obscenity charges. All copies of the film were confiscated from Nikkatsu and from Takechi's own home, and Takechi was arrested. The controversy gained international attention with The New York Times reporting that even the two censors who had passed the film were considered for prosecution, and that the government had announced plans to strictly censor the pink film movement. Japan's intellectual and artistic community came to Takechi's defense. Film directors Nagisa Oshima and Seijun Suzuki and authors Yukio Mishima and Kōbō Abe testified in Takechi's defense at the trial. Takechi took advantage of every opportunity to publicly speak out against censorship, and one Eirin official later admitted to being "terrified by the man".

Explicitly linking his interests in kabuki and pornography as forms of expression, in the July 1965 issue of the film journal Eiga Geijutsu, Takechi wrote:

The censors are getting tough about Black Snow. I admit there are many nude scenes in the film, but they are psychological nude scenes symbolizing the defencelessness of the Japanese people in the face of the American invasion. Prompted by the CIA and the U.S. Army they say my film is immoral. This is of course an old story that has been going on for centuries. When they suppressed Kabuki plays during the Edo period, forbidding women to act, because of prostitution, and young actors, because of homosexuality, they said it was to preserve public morals. In fact it was a matter of rank political suppression.

By shutting down Black Snow and prosecuting Takechi, Eirin had intended to suppress the new pink film genre, but the trial had the exact opposite outcome. The publicity surrounding the trial brought the pink film genre to the attention of the general public, and helped inspire the wave of pink films which dominated Japan's domestic cinema for the next two decades.

=== After Black Snow ===
During the legal battles of the trial, Takechi filmed a pink film re-telling of The Tale of Genji, which, like Tanizaki's work, contains eroticism in the original, though not of a sexually-explicit nature. On 17 September 1967, Takechi won the Black Snow case. He also successfully countersued the government claiming that the accusation of indecency was politically motivated, due to the film's anti-American and anti-capitalist themes.

Takechi's next film after the trial was Ukiyo-e Cruel Story (1968), starring the current "Queen" of Pink films, Noriko Tatsumi. The Weissers call this film, about a painter of erotic pictures who is persecuted by the government, "Takechi's personal message to Eirin." Though still containing significant erotic content, this is one of Takechi's few films to pass the censor relatively un-edited, perhaps because Eirin saw the obvious anti-governmental censorship message in the film, and did not wish to be provoked into another embarrassing public confrontation with the outspoken director.

Though he had won his court case, Takechi had become known as a risky and dangerous entity in the film world. Newspapers refused to advertise his films, and Takechi spent the next decade concentrating on writing projects. After his friend, the writer Yukio Mishima, committed hara-kiri in 1970, Takechi wrote The Head of Yukio Mishima, a best-selling, fictionalized version of the incident. In 1972, he again appeared in an acting role for director Kaneto Shindō in his Art Theatre Guild film based on a Tanizaki novel, Sanka.

=== Return to film ===
In 1981, the then 68-year-old Takechi decided to return to film with a series of theatrical hardcore films, beginning with a remake of his 1964 Daydream, also titled Daydream. Noticing actress Kyōko Aizome in one of her nude photo magazine appearances, Takechi chose her to star in the film. Japan's first theatrically released film featuring hardcore sex, Aizome added to the controversy surrounding the film by admitting to having performed actual sexual intercourse on camera. Though, as Japanese law required, sexual organs and pubic hair were fogged on screen, the Asahi Shimbun called it a breakthrough film, and Japan's first hardcore pornographic movie. Takechi took a novel, yet traditional approach to the fogging by covering the forbidden areas with floating images of topless female shamisen players. Unlike Takechi's earlier Dream of the Red Chamber, the full, uncensored version of Daydream 1981 did survive, and circulated underground in Japan. This uncensored version of the film was released on video at one time in the Netherlands.

Takechi's next film, Courtesan (Oiran, 1983), like his Daydream films, was based on a Tanizaki novel. Three studios were involved in the production: Fujii Movies, Ogawa Productions, and Takechi Film. The film is set at the end of the 19th century, and tells the story of a Yokohama prostitute who services American sailors. The woman is possessed by the spirit of her dead lover, who, in erotic scenes echoing The Exorcist (1973), makes his presence known whenever she is sexually aroused. Because of the large budget involved in the production, the distributing studio submitted Courtesan to Eirin repeatedly, and agreed to every cut the reviewing board recommended. The heavy cutting the film received reduced it from near-hardcore to a very softcore historical drama. Takechi again took advantage of the situation to fight Eirin, and complained publicly about the censorship. When he noticed that the censors had painted over a penis with colors, he ridiculed them by promoting his film with the line, "See the first multicolored penis in Japanese Cinema!"

After this bout with the censors, Takechi vowed to produce a true, hardcore film for Japanese audiences. The result was Sacred Koya (Koya Hijiri), based on a work by Kyōka Izumi. He refused to allow the film to be censored in any way, either through cutting or fogging. Refusing to release the film in Japan, he did not submit it for Eirin's approval. Instead, he released it in Guam, where it played primarily to Japanese tourist audiences for several years under the U.S.'s more liberal pornography laws. Takechi's last film was another remake of Daydream in 1987, again starring Kyōko Aizome. Though it was a low-budget, independent production which again underwent censorship in Japan, it became very popular in its uncensored form in France.

Takechi's come-back films of the 1980s were all in a theatrical hardcore style. Released during the dawn of the AV, or adult video, and the height of Nikkatsu's softcore Roman porno films, his films fit into neither style. Jasper Sharp writes, "His big-budget pornos came from a different world to that of the pink and Roman Porno films. There was nothing else like them at the time, and consequently they had little influence on domestically produced sex films. Takechi died of pancreatic cancer the following year, on 26 July 1988. Without a major studio's backing or interest from the general pink film community, Takechi's name and films faded into obscurity in Japan. In 2006 his career was the subject of a full retrospective showing in Tokyo's Image Forum in 2006.

== Legacy ==
Jasper Sharp points out that the Japanese and western views of Takechi's legacy are quite different. While western sources assess him as a major figure in the early development of the pink film, many current Japanese sources on the subject ignore his work. Sharp notes, however, that during his lifetime, he was covered prominently in Japanese sources. He speculates that his legacy has been largely forgotten in his homeland partly because of his status as an outsider in the Japanese film communities—both mainstream and pink. Since his films were self-produced and distributed by major film companies rather than through the eroduction circuit, they are not technically pink films. Also, his right-wing political background conflicts with the generally revolutionary stance more often associated with the pink film. Since his death in 1988, the lack of a studio or other publicist, or coverage by writers on the pink film has kept his work out of the public's eye in Japan. In the west, however, some of Takechi's films, such as Daydream were shown during their first runs, reviewed by major publications such as Variety, and have been preserved and remained available to genre audiences on home video releases.

During his lifetime, Takechi's innovations and contributions to Japanese theater in general and to kabuki specifically were influential for decades. His theoretical work, as well as his mentoring of several important stars, helped bring about a rebirth in kabuki after World War II. His contributions to cinema were much more controversial. Considered a dilettante outsider by much of the film industry, and suspected of racism and nationalism by others, his work was nevertheless defended by the younger generation of filmmakers such as Seijun Suzuki and Nagisa Oshima. Though his films are today unknown to most Japanese filmgoers, through his career-long fight against censorship, the taboos which his films helped break, and the creative freedom which he helped enable, he remains an important figure in Japanese cinema.

== Filmography ==
Title	Cast	Release date
Women... Oh, Women! 日本の夜 女・女・女物語; Nihon no yoru: Onna onna onna monogatari		15 May 1963
Daydream 白日夢; Hakujitsumu	Kanako Michi; Akira Ishihama	21 June 1964
The Dream of the Red Chamber aka Crimson Dream 紅閨夢; Kōkeimu	Yōkichi Goto; Mina Yanagi; Chiyo Aoi	12 August 1964
Black Snow 黒い雪; Kuroi yuki	Akira Ishihama; Chitose Kurenai; Kotobuki Hananomoto; Chōjirō Hanagawa; Yōichirō Mikawa	9 June 1965
The Tale of Genji 源氏物語; Genji monogatari	Kotobuki Hananomoto; Ruriko Asaoka; Izumi Ashikawa	14 January 1966
Genjitsu 幻日; Genjitsu		1966
Postwar Cruel Story 戦後残酷物語; Sengo zankoku monogatari	Chitose Kurenai; Kanako Michi; Masako Arisawa	10 February 1968
Ukiyo-e Cruel Story 浮世絵残酷物語; Ukiyo-e zankoku monogatari	Tamawa Karina; Noriko Tatsumi; Ryuji Inazuma	9 September 1968
Madam Scandal スキャンダル夫人; Scandal fujin	Junko Nishitani; Michiko Sakyō; Toyozo Yamamoto	28 February 1973
Daydream 白日夢; Hakujitsumu	Kei Satō; Kyōko Aizome; Takemi Katsushika	12 September 1981
Courtesan 華魁; Oiran	Takako Shinozuka; Satoshi Mashiba; Midori Yuzaki; Kozue Azusa	19 February 1983
Sacred Koya 高野聖; Koya Hijiri		1984
Daydream 2 aka Captured For Sex 白昼夢2; Hakujitsumu zoku	Kei Satō; Kyōko Aizome; Kenji Hayami	7 February 1987

== Selected writings ==
Title	Publication date
The Dawn of the Kabuki 歌舞伎の黎明; Kabuki no reimei	1955
Eros Accused 裁かれるエロス; Sabakareru Eros	1967
Tradition and Disruption 伝統と断絶; Dentō to danzetsu	1969
Yukio Mishima: His Death and His View of the Kabuki 三島由紀夫・死とその歌舞伎観; Mishima Yukio: Shi to sono kabukikan	1971

== Sources ==
- "Age 75: 武智鉄二 / Tetsuji Takechi" (in Japanese). Art Random. 6 December 2005. Archived from the original on 4 March 2009.
- da Silva, Joaquin (18 March 2014). "Obscenity and Article 175 of the Japanese Penal Code: A Short Introduction to Japanese Censorship".
- "Japanese Get New Type Burlesque". Mansfield News Journal. Mansfield, Ohio. International News Service. 14 December 1956. p. 29.
- Kominz, Laurence (1997). The Stars Who Created Kabuki; Their Lives, Loves and Legacy. Tokyo, New York, London: Kodansha International. ISBN 4-7700-1868-1.
- Leiter, Samuel L. (1999) [1979]. The Art of Kabuki: Five Famous Plays. Mineola; New York; London: Dover Publications. pp. 71–73, 75, 76, 166, 167, 169. ISBN 0-486-40872-8.
- Salz, Jonah (2007). "Contesting Authority through Comic Disruption: Mixed Marriages as Metaphor in Postwar Kyogen Experiments". In Hiroshi Nara (ed.). Inexorable Modernity: Japan's Grappling with Modernity in the Arts. Lanham, Maryland: Lexington Books. pp. 129–150. ISBN 978-0-7391-1842-9.
- Sharp, Jasper. "Black Snow review". midnighteye.com.
- Sharp, Jasper. "Daydream (1981) review". midnighteye.com.
- Sharp, Jasper. "Oiran (review)". midnighteye.com.
- Sharp, Jasper. "Tetsuji Takechi: Erotic Nightmares". midnighteye.com.
- "New Type of Burlesque Stirs Dispute in Japan". Albuquerque Journal. Albuquerque, New Mexico. International News Service. 9 December 1956. p. 20.
- "New Variety of Burlesque Hits Japan". The Lima News. Lima, Ohio. International News Service. 14 December 1956. p. A–13.
- Sharp, Jasper (2008). Behind the Pink Curtain: The Complete History of Japanese Sex Cinema. Guildford: FAB Press. pp. 71–75. ISBN 978-1-903254-54-7.
- "武智鉄二 (Takechi Tetsuji)" (in Japanese). Japanese Movie Database.
- "TETSUJI TAKECHI". The Complete Index to World Film.
- Tetsuji Takechi at IMDb
- Takechi, Tetsuji (2003). "Artistic Direction in Takechi Kabuki". Asian Theatre Journal. 20 (1). Translated by William Lee: 12–24. doi:10.1353/atj.2003.0012. S2CID 161991213.
- Toita, Yasuji (1970). "Zenshin-za Innovations". Kabuki: The Popular Theater. Performing Arts of Japan: II. Don Kenny (trans.). New York & Tokyo: Walker/Weatherhill. pp. 213. ISBN 0-8027-2424-8.
- Weisser, Thomas; Yuko Mihara Weisser (1998). Japanese Cinema Encyclopedia: The Sex Films. Miami: Vital Books : Asian Cult Cinema Publications. ISBN 1-889288-52-7.
- 晩秋イメージフォーラムにて大特集「武智鉄二全集」. cinematopics.com (in Japanese). 8 September 2006. Archived from the original on 21 July 2011.
