= Daydream (1964 film) =

Japanese erotic film by Tetsuji Takechi

- Poster
- Directed by: Tetsuji Takechi
- Written by: Tetsuji Takechi; Jun'ichiro Tanizaki (original story)
- Produced by: Toyojiro Nagashima
- Starring: Kanako Michi; Akira Ishihama; Chojuro Hanakawa
- Cinematography: Akira Takeda
- Edited by: Hanjiro Kaneko
- Music by: Sukehisa Shiba
- Distributed by: Shochiku
- Release date: 21 June 1964 (Japan)
- Running time: 93 minutes
- Country: Japan
- Language: Japanese

Daydream (Japanese: 白日夢, Hepburn: Hakujitsumu) is a 1964 Japanese pink film. It was the first erotic film to have a big budget and a mainstream release in Japan, and was shown at the Venice Film Festival and given two releases in the United States. Director Tetsuji Takechi remade the film in hardcore versions in 1981 and 1987. Both of these remakes starred actress Kyōko Aizome.

== Background ==
=== Early erotic films ===
In the years since the end of World War II, eroticism had been gradually making its way into Japanese cinema. The first kiss to be seen in Japanese film—discreetly half-hidden by an umbrella—caused a national sensation in 1946. In the mid-1950s, the controversial taiyozoku films on the teen-age "Sun Tribe", such as Ko Nakahira's Crazed Fruit (1956), introduced unprecedented sexual frankness into Japanese films. At the same time, films such as Shintoho's female pearl-diver films starring buxom Michiko Maeda, began showing more flesh than would have previously been imaginable in the Japanese cinema. Nevertheless, until the early 1960s, graphic depictions of nudity and sex in Japanese film could only be seen in single-reel "stag films", made illegally by underground film producers such as those depicted in Imamura's film The Pornographers (1966).

Nudity and sex would officially enter the Japanese cinema with the independent, low-budget pink film genre. Known as eroductions at the time, Pink films made up the bulk of releases in the 1960s. The first true pink film, and the first Japanese movie with nude scenes, was Satoru Kobayashi's controversial and popular independent production Flesh Market (Nikutai no Ichiba, 1962). Director Seijun Suzuki's Gate of Flesh (1964) was the first Japanese mainstream film to contain nudity.

=== Tetsuji Takechi ===
Before entering film, Tetsuji Takechi was a theatrical director, especially known for his innovative contributions to kabuki. Always attracted to controversy, when his interests turned to the cinema in 1963, he focused on erotic films. His first film was Women... Oh, Women! (Nihon No Yoru: Onna Onna Onna Monogatari - A Night In Japan: Woman, Woman, Woman Story, (1963), a sex-documentary which was later given a U.S. release. Daydream, Takechi's second film, was the first big-budget, mainstream erotic film. Artistically shot by Akira Takeda, who was Nagisa Oshima's cinematographer between 1965 and 1968, the film was produced independently but released by Shochiku studios who gave it a major publicity campaign.

== Plot ==
The story is loosely based on a 1926 short story by Jun'ichirō Tanizaki, published in Chūōkōron in September 1926. The film opens as an artist and a young woman are in a dentist's waiting room. Though he is attracted to the woman, he says nothing to her. They are later in the same examining room. When the artist is given an anaesthetic, he begins to imagine a series of scenes in which the woman undergoes various forms of sexual abuse at the hand of the dentist, including rape and torture. When the artist recovers from the anaesthetic, he finds bite marks on the woman's breast, indicating that he may not have been hallucinating.

== Cast ==
- Kanako Michi (Cheiko)
- Akira Ishihama (Kurahashi)
- Chojuro Hanakawa (Dentist)
- Yasuko Matsui (Nurse)

== Reception ==
Though modest compared to pink films which would come soon after, Daydream did contain female nudity, including a brief shot of pubic hair. To the outsider, Japanese censors can seem surprisingly lenient in what is allowed on film, but the depiction of pubic hair and genitalia was strictly forbidden. Takechi fought the government's censorship of this shot, but lost. When the censors obscured the offending hair with a fuzzy white dot, Daydream became the first film in Japanese cinema to undergo "fogging," which would become one of the trademarks of Japanese pornography for decades.

The Japanese government was also displeased with the film because it was released during the Tokyo Olympics, at a time when the world's attention was focused on the country. The authorities were not happy with the impression a widely released sex film might give. The Japan Dental Association protested against the film because of its unsavory depiction of their profession in the character of the dentist. Also, author Jun'ichirō Tanizaki was reportedly unhappy with the film. Tanizaki had worked with the cinema during the 1920s, and regarded Takechi's film as a sign of the decline of the Japanese cinema. Nevertheless, Daydream was a major success in Japan, greatly contributing to the acceptance of nudity in Japanese mainstream cinema.

Daydream was presented to the Venice Film Festival in September 1964, but not accepted as an entry. Variety commented that it would have been acceptable as a special entry, adding, "It would probably have raised howls both for and against it." Variety gave the film a positive review, saying that despite the female nudity and erotic and perverse scenes, it was not done in bad taste. The review comments approvingly on the performances of Kanako Michi, Akira Ishihama and Chojuro Hanakawa. Director Tetsuji Takechi was also complemented for his "proper balance of over-statement and mock seriousness." About the film as a whole, the review says, "It is neatly lensed and edited with a gory color scene imbedded in this primarily black and white pic... This film could be accused of bad taste or pornography, and the many scenes of simulated love climaxes may add to this theory. But it also parodies and pokes fun at prudishness, sex overemphasis and the more lascivious love and adventure pix."

Though Variety warned of possible censorship problems, it recommended distribution of Daydream in the United States for the foreign film, art film and exploitation markets. The film received two releases in the U.S., first opening in Los Angeles on 4 December 1964. Joseph Green, director of the cult film The Brain that Wouldn't Die (1962) re-released Daydream in the U.S. in 1966, adding his own footage to the film. This release of the film opened in San Francisco.

== Korean remake ==
Takechi's film was remade by the prominent South Korean director Yu Hyun-mok in 1965 as An Empty Dream (춘몽 - Chunmong). Because of rumors of a brief nude scene, Yu was arrested, even though the controversial scene had been removed before its public release. Since the charges were that actress, Park Su-jeong, had been humiliated by appearing nude on the set, this was irrelevant. What may have been relevant, was that she was not actually nude, but wearing a body stocking during the scene. In his Behind the Pink Curtain: The Complete History of Japanese Sex Cinema, Jasper Sharp reports that the arrest was due more to political reasons than obscenity. Yu was released, but fined, and the film was removed from circulation until its return at the 2004 Puchon International Fantastic Film Festival. Comparing Yu's film to Takechi's, Sharp writes that the Korean remake is, "a far superior work, reminiscent of early French surrealism or German expressionism..."

== Legacy ==
Today Daydream retains a high reputation among Pink films. The Scarecrow Video Movie Guide calls Daydream an "extraordinary little film" which, by stimulating the Pink film genre, "changed Japanese films forever."

After the success of Daydream, Takechi would continue to be a leading figure in the Pink film genre for two decades. He released his third film, The Dream of the Red Chamber (Koromu, 1964) the same year as Daydream's release. The government subjected The Dream of the Red Chamber to extensive censorship before allowing it to be shown publicly. Eirin, the Japanese film-monitoring board, cut about 20% of the film's original content, and this footage is now considered lost. Takechi followed this first conflict with the government with the even more controversial, politically provocative "Black Snow" in 1965. This film would result in Takechi's arrest, and the first motion picture obscenity trial in Japan. He was a television show host in the 1970s. At the age of 68, with his 1981 re-make of Daydream, he became the director of the first theatrically released hardcore pornographic film in Japan.
