= Women... Oh, Women! =

- Poster of Women... Oh, Women! (1963)
- Directed by: Tetsuji Takechi
- Written by: Tatsuji Tsuta
- Produced by: Toyojiro Nagashima
- Cinematography: Kazutoshi Akutagawa
- Music by: Jiro Takemura
- Distributed by: Sano Art Productions; Shochiku
- Release date: May 15, 1963 (Japan)
- Running time: 80 minutes
- Country: Japan
- Language: Japanese

Women... Oh, Women! (Japanese: 日本の夜 女・女・女物語, Hepburn: Nihon no yoru: Onna onna onna monogatari; lit. A Night In Japan: Woman, Woman, Woman Story) is a 1963 Japanese documentary pink film. The first of these softcore pornographic films directed by Tetsuji Takechi, it was released in the United States in 1964.

== Background ==
=== Origins of the Pink film ===
In the years since the end of World War II, eroticism had been gradually making its way into Japanese cinema. The first kiss to be seen in Japanese film—discreetly half-hidden by an umbrella—caused a national sensation in 1946. In the mid-1950s, the controversial taiyozoku films on the teen-age "Sun Tribe", such as Ko Nakahira's Crazed Fruit (1956), introduced unprecedented sexual frankness into Japanese films. At the same time, films such as Shintoho's female pearl-diver films starring buxom Michiko Maeda, began showing more flesh than would have previously been imaginable in the Japanese cinema. Nevertheless, until the early 1960s, graphic depictions of nudity and sex in Japanese film could only be seen in single-reel "stag films," made illegally by underground film producers such as those depicted in Imamura's film The Pornographers (1966).

Nudity and sex would officially enter the Japanese cinema with the independent, low-budget pink film genre. Known as eroductions at the time, the Pink films genre would come to dominate domestically-produced films in the 1960s and 1970s. The first true pink film, and the first Japanese movie with nude scenes, was Satoru Kobayashi's controversial and popular independent production Flesh Market (Nikutai no Ichiba, 1962).

=== Tetsuji Takechi ===
Before entering film, Tetsuji Takechi was a theatrical director, especially known for his innovative contributions to kabuki. Always attracted to controversy, when his interests turned to the cinema in 1963, he focused on the Pink film. Women... Oh, Women! was his first film.

== Synopsis ==
Women... Oh, Women! is a sex-documentary focusing on the women of Japan, with particular emphasis on participants in the country's night-life. The film is a series of scenes visiting a variety of women such as female wrestlers, strippers, and geisha. Nuns and sea divers are also shown, along with scenes of transvestism and drug addiction.

== Legacy ==
Women... Oh, Women! was produced independently by a company called Sano Art Productions. Shochiku studios, one of Japan's major film companies, picked up the film for distribution. Shochiku would also distribute Takechi's next film, Daydream (1964) and gave it a major publicity campaign.

Women... Oh, Women! was released in the United States, where it opened in Los Angeles on September 18, 1964. The success of Women... Oh, Women! would lead to Takechi's major work, Daydream, which would ensure his position as a controversial leading figure in censorship battles in Japan, and in the Pink film genre for two decades. In October 2006 Women... Oh, Women! was shown as part of a Takechi retrospective, and it was released on DVD in Japan on January 25, 2008.

== Sources ==
- Krafsur, Richard P. (1976). "Women... Oh, Women! (Japan)". American Film Institute Catalog of Motion Pictures, The; Feature Films 1961–70. New York & London: R. R. Bowker Company. p. 1241. ISBN 0-8352-0440-5.
- "ONNA ONNA ONNA MONOGATARI". Complete Index to World Film.
- Onna onna onna monogatari (1963) at IMDb
- Sharp, Jasper. "Tetsuji Takechi: Erotic Nightmares". www.midnighteye.com.
- Weisser, Thomas; Yuko Mihara Weisser (1998). Japanese Cinema Encyclopedia: The Sex Films. Miami: Vital Books : Asian Cult Cinema Publications. ISBN 1-889288-52-7.
- "日本の夜 女・女・女物語 (Nihon no yoru: Onna onna onna monogatari)" (in Japanese). Japanese Movie Database.
- "日本の夜 女・女・女物語 (Nihon no yoru: Onna onna onna monogatari)" (in Japanese). www.cinematopics.com.
