= Censor bars =

Basic form of censorship

Censor bars, also known as black bars, are a form of text, photography, or video censorship in which sensitive content is occluded by rectangular monochrome boxes. Since the creation of digital editing software which can apply less obtrusive effects such as pixelization and blurring, censor bars are typically used for satire. but remain in use to address privacy concerns. Censor bars are also used in art forms such as blackout poetry.

Censor bars may also have the words "censored", "redacted", "private information", "sensitive information", etc. to indicate their presence. Alternative methods of obscuring content include overlaid images such as fig leaves.

== Illustrations of usage ==
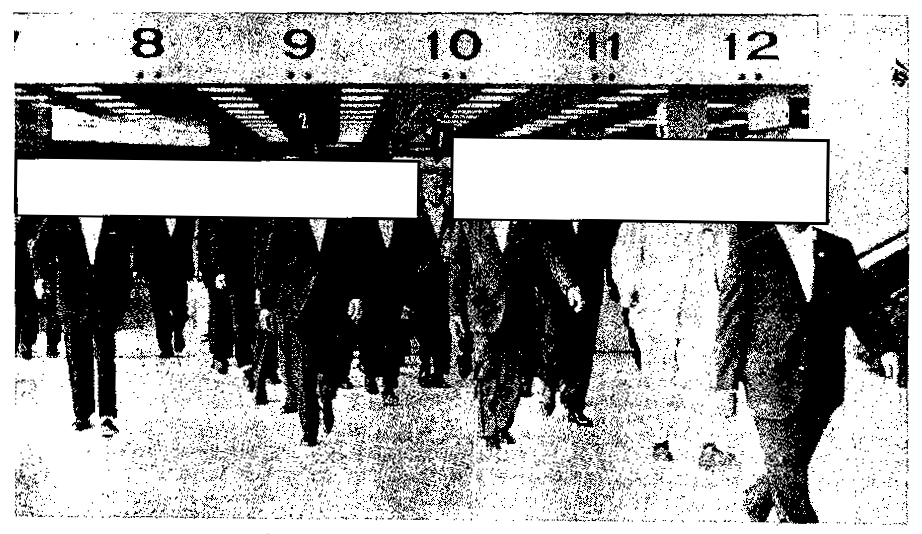
A 1965 Federal Bureau of Investigation surveillance photograph

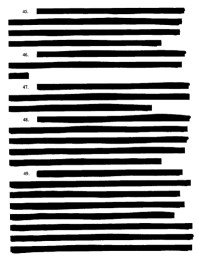
A heavily redacted page from the lawsuit American Civil Liberties Union v. Ashcroft

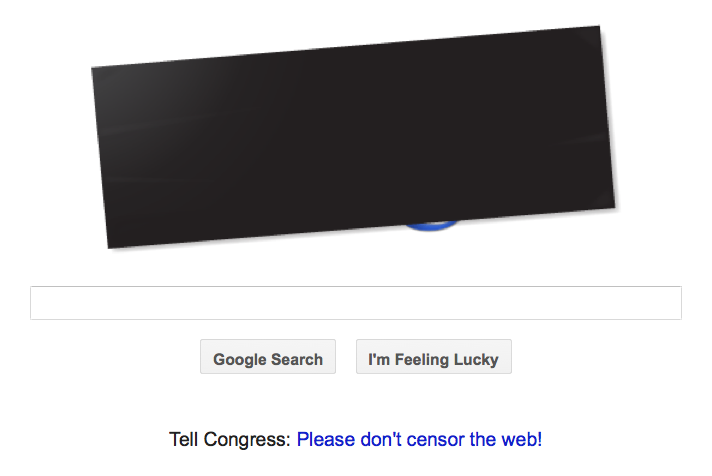
The censor bar as used by Google in the SOPA and PIPA online protests

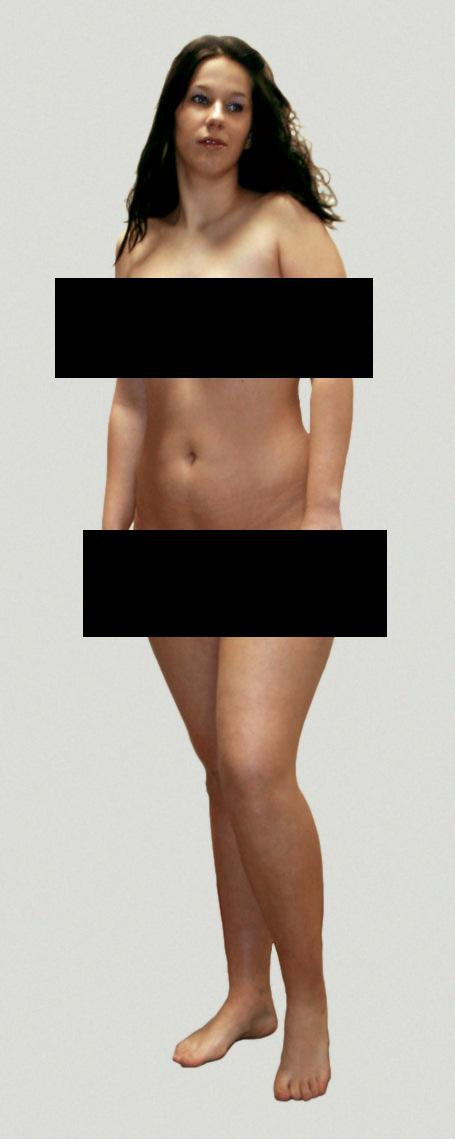
Censor bars applied to a model

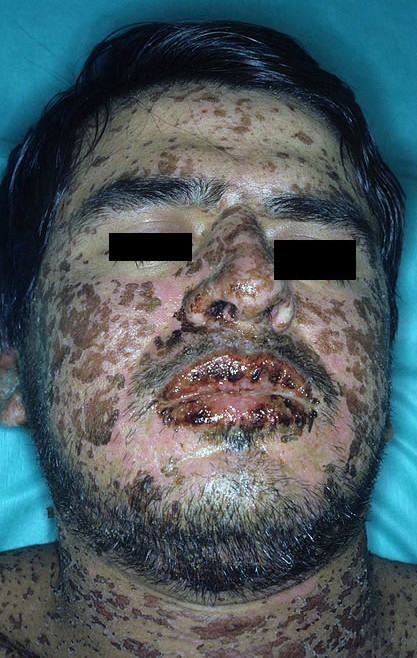
Censor bars applied to a patient with Stevens–Johnson syndrome

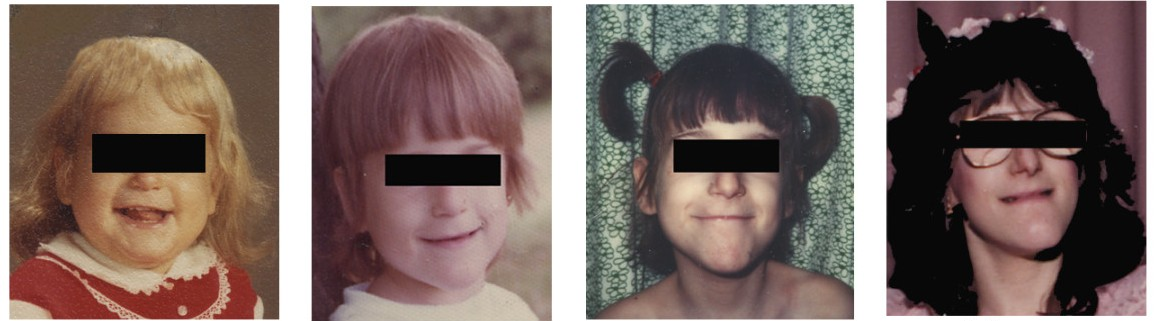
Censor bars used to anonymise a woman with familial dysautonomia

The Turkish Wikipedia logo with a censor bar covering the text, used from April 2017 to January 2020 when Turkish authorities blocked online access to Wikipedia in all languages across Turkey

A portion of the redacted affidavit used to obtain a search warrant for former U.S. President Donald Trump's Mar-a-Lago home and resort, with the signature block blacked out

== See also ==
- Bleep censor
- Colour banding
- Fogging (censorship), an alternate technique
- Tape delay (broadcasting)
- Fig leaf - Artistic or metaphorical censorship practice
- Redaction (also known as sanitization) — the process of removing sensitive information from a document before distribution to a broader audience
- Full Block — A Unicode character commonly used for redaction.
