= Daydream (1981 film) =

- Release poster
- Directed by: Tetsuji Takechi
- Written by: Tetsuji Takechi; Jun'ichiro Tanizaki (original story)
- Produced by: Toshiyuki Ike; Ariyuki Maeda
- Starring: Kyōko Aizome
- Cinematography: Akira Takeda
- Edited by: Kunihiko Ukai; Jun'ichi Kikuchi; Hisako Shimomura
- Distributed by: Fuji Eiga
- Release date: 12 September 1981
- Running time: 110 minutes
- Country: Japan
- Language: Japanese

Daydream (白日夢, Hakujitsumu) is a 1981 Japanese pink film directed by Tetsuji Takechi. It is a remake of Takechi's 1964 pink film of the same name, and is considered the first hardcore pornographic film to be released theatrically in Japan.

== Cast ==
Role	Actor
Woman	Kyōko Aizome
Dentist	Kei Satō

== Production ==
Maverick theater and film director Tetsuji Takechi had directed Japan's first big-budget pink film in 1964 with Daydream. He directed more films in the 1960s, including Black Snow 1965, which resulted in a high-profile obscenity trial. During the 1970s, he concentrated on writing projects, and served as the host of a successful television series, The Tetsuji Takechi Hour for the previous decade. In 1981, the then 68-year old Takechi decided to return to film with a hardcore remake of Daydream. Takechi again chose Akira Takeda, Nagisa Oshima's cinematographer between 1965 and 1968, to shoot his film.

Noticing Kyōko Aizome in one of her nude photo magazine appearances, Takechi chose the then unknown actress to star in the film. After the film's release, Aizome added to the controversy by admitting to having performed actual sexual intercourse on camera. Though, as Japanese law required, sexual organs and pubic hair were fogged on screen, the Asahi Shimbun called it a breakthrough film as Japan's first hardcore pornographic movie, and Aizome received national notoriety from starring in the film, thereby becoming Japan's first hardcore pornographic star. Her name became a selling-point for future films such as Kyōko Aizome's Somber Reminiscence (1983). Sexual acts in the movie are unsimulated.

== Sources ==
- "Daydream 81" (in French). pinku.cho-yaba.com. Archived from the original on 2007-08-28.
- Koizumi, Shinichi (2001-12-01). "Porn-star label now a badge of honor for actress". Asahi Shimbun. Archived from the original on 2001-12-03.
- Sharp, Jasper. "Daydream (1981) review". www.midnighteye.com.
- Sharp, Jasper. "Tetsuji Takechi: Erotic Nightmares". www.midnighteye.com.
- Weisser, Thomas; Yuko Mihara Weisser (1998). Japanese Cinema Encyclopedia: The Sex Films. Miami: Vital Books : Asian Cult Cinema Publications. ISBN 1-889288-52-7.
- 白日夢 (in Japanese). www.cinematopics.com. Archived from the original on 2011-07-21.
