= Pixelization =

Blurring technique in images or videos

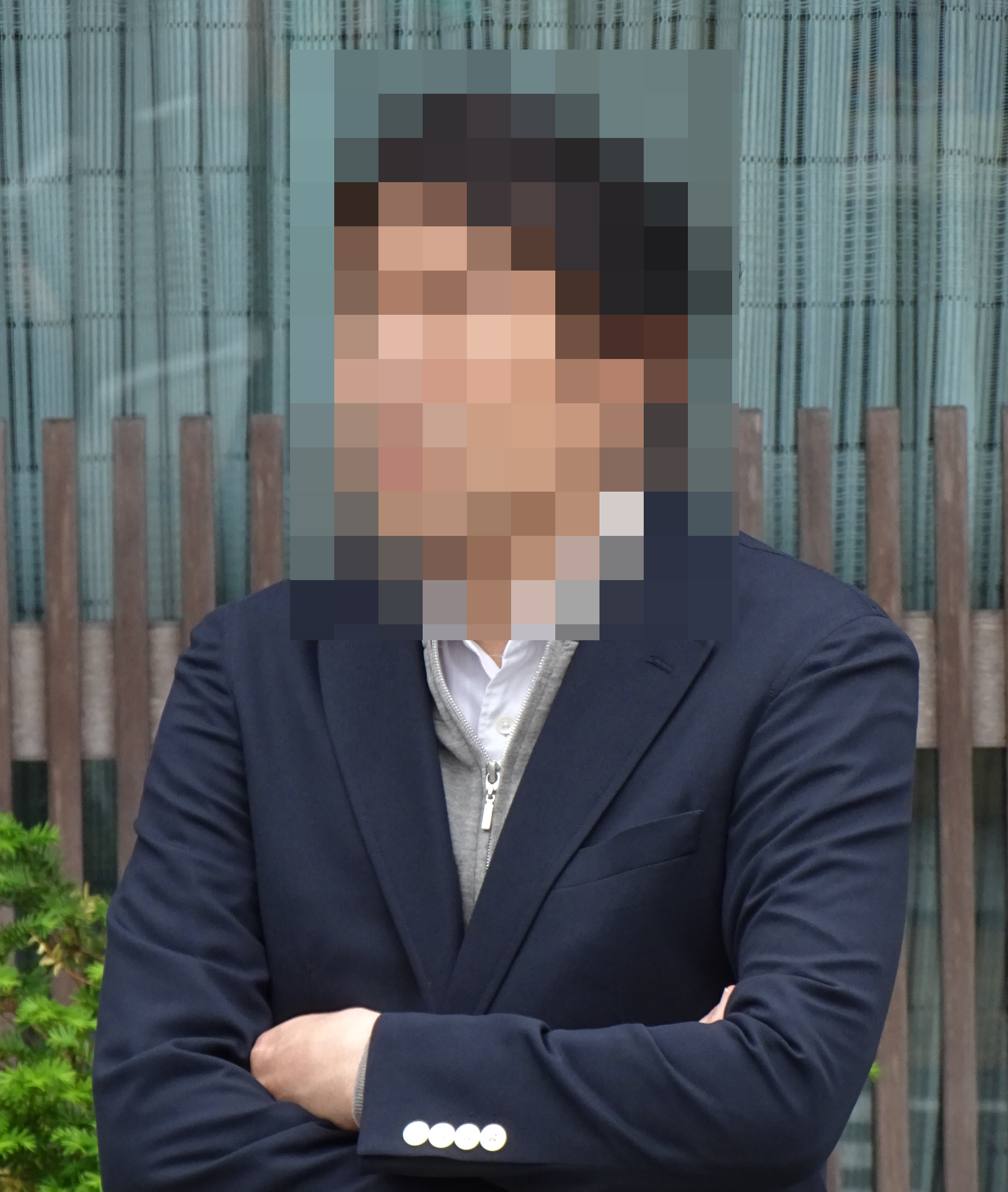
A photo where the subject's face has been pixelised

Pixelization (in British English pixelisation) or mosaic processing is any technique used in editing images or video, whereby an image is blurred by displaying part or all of it at a markedly lower resolution. It is primarily used for censorship. The effect is a standard graphics filter, available in all but the most basic bitmap graphics editors.

== In media ==
Pixelization has also been used for artistic effect, notably in the art print The Wave of the Future, a reinterpretation of Katsushika Hokusai's The Great Wave off Kanagawa. In this updated print, the image of the large ocean wave shifts from the traditional style of the Japanese woodcut print to a pixelized image and finally to a wireframe model computer graphics image. Westworld (1973) was the first feature film to use digital image processing to pixelize photography to simulate an android's point of view.

The 2010 third-person cover shooter Kane & Lynch 2: Dog Days also used pixelization for artistic purposes, as nudity and headshots are pixelated in the game, to make the game appear more like user-generated content.

== Alternative techniques ==
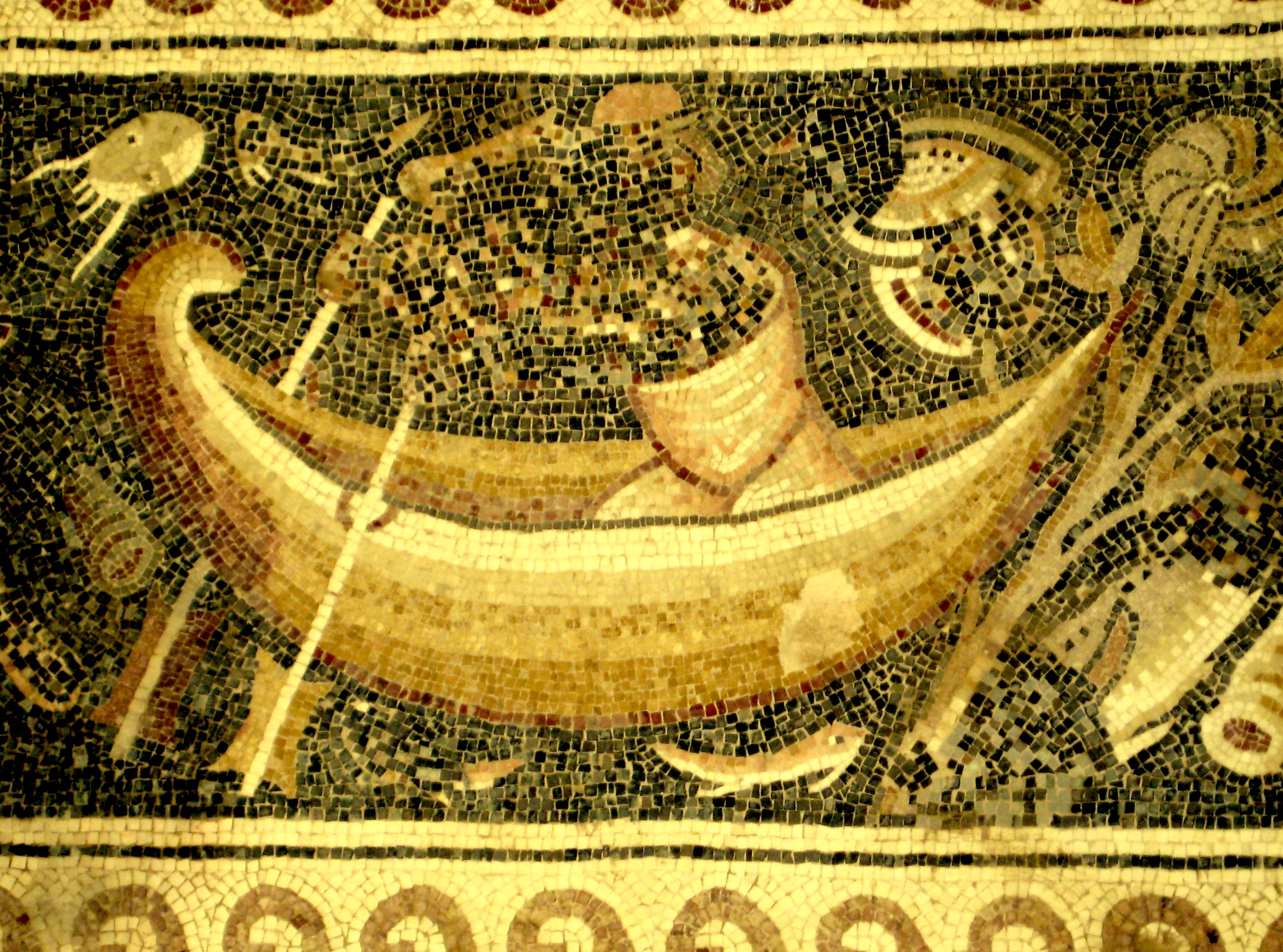
The mosaic tiles of this human figure in the Saint Stephen Church in Umm ar-Rasas in Jordan have been rearranged by aniconists.

A black rectangular or square box (known as censor bars) may be used to occlude parts of images completely (for example, a black bar covering the eyes instead of the entire face being pixelized). Censor bars were extensively used as a graphic device in the January 2012 protests against SOPA and PIPA.

A drawback of pixelization is that any differences between the large pixels can be exploited in moving images to reconstruct the original, unpixelized image; squinting at a pixelized, moving image can sometimes achieve a similar result. In both cases, integration of the large pixels over time allows smaller, more accurate pixels to be constructed in a still image result. Completely obscuring the censored area with pixels of a constant color or pixels of random colors escapes this drawback but can be more aesthetically jarring.

An additional drawback, when pixelization is used to reduce the repulsing, disturbing or, more generally shocking, aspect of an image, is that all information contained in the pixelized area is lost for the audience. Other visual processing techniques can help reduce the shocking aspect of images or videos while preserving most of the information of the media.

== International legal standards ==
Nudity is obscured on broadcast television stations in the United States. The Federal Communications Commission states it is a violation of federal law to air obscene, indecent, and profane programming at any time, especially during certain hours. Monetary penalties and revocation of licenses are issued for law breakers. Japanese pornography laws require that genitals in films (including animated works) and other forms of adult media (such as eroge, drawings, etc) be obscured. Article 175 of Penal Code (Act No.45 of 1907) still in effect today in Japan forbids any person and imprisons anyone who distributes, sells or displays in public an obscene document, drawing or other objects of such nature. In Thailand, restrictions are placed on television broadcast depiction of cigarettes being smoked, alcohol being consumed, or guns being pointed at people. Pixelization is one method of censoring this content.

== See also ==
- Bleep censor
- Colour banding
- Fogging (censorship), an alternate technique
- Posterization
- Reverse video
- Tape delay (broadcasting)
- Use of pixelation in camouflage patterns such as MARPAT
