= Comic sound =

Types of comical sounds

Despite criticisms of being a vulgar form of humour, use of comic sound as a way of causing laughter has become a recognized and commonly used method. These types of sounds are typical of children's cartoons and slapstick comedy.

The classic comedy duo of Laurel and Hardy were pioneers in the use of comic sound as they transitioned from silent film to "talkies".

Key examples of its use in society and media works are:

- Flatulence - Various toys have been produced to replicate this sound, i.e., whoopie cushions.
- Ape or monkey-like noises.
- Saying a commonly recognized name in a humorous or unusual way.
- Saying the name of the person you are greeting on the exhale creating a skeletal voice tone.
- Coughing or sneezing in large amounts to either:
1. Annoy a nearby person, possibly an authority figure.
2. Intentionally cover up the end of a sentence or a certain word.
- A trumpet playing a descending passage with a Wah-wah mute to signify a failure or mistake.
- A short drum fill played after a joke's punchline (as in Stand-up comedy).
- Loud horn noises sounded when someone is struck in a painful manner.
