= Fogging (censorship) =

Censored blurring used in photos and film

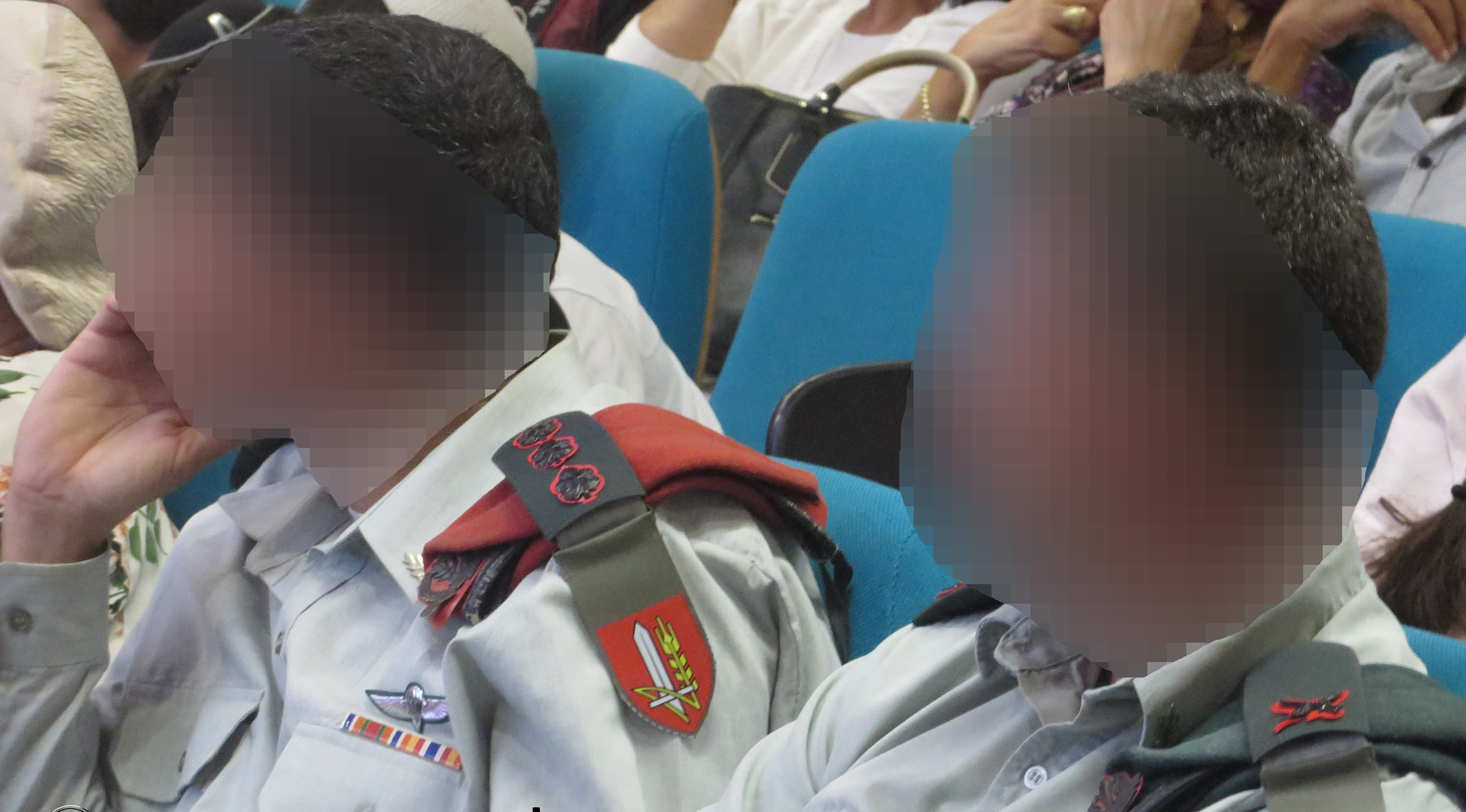
An image in which people's faces have been fogged or blurred out

Fogging, also known as blurring, is a type of visual used for censorship or privacy. A visual area of a picture, tv show, video, or a movie is blurred to obscure it from sight. This type of form of censorship is used for sexually related images/scenes, hiding genitals, pubic hair, buttocks, female nipples/breasts, someone saying offensive words on lip reading, or sexual activity of any sort. Pixelization is a form of fogging. In Japan, where it is called bokashi, fogging is employed on most films aired on public television that feature adult content of any kind, or on most films that show pubic hair or genitals, including hardcore pornography.

This form of editing also appears in television programs where an individual's face may not be shown due to legal or privacy concerns. As it does not contrast with the surrounding image very much, it is arguably preferable over most other forms of censorship. However, unlike other forms of visual censoring, it does not allow the preservation of any information about the original stimulus. Fogging is also used if a scene is too bloody and gruesome to be rendered even in black and white, and also used when obscene language is being censored by an audible bleep, and when the "finger" gesture is shown, as well as on vehicle license plates (to protect the identity of a vehicle's owner), and over branded items and specific company names to prevent trademark or copyright issues.

Although it is generally effective for obscuring details from the naked eye, fogging is not a sure method of removing information from images, as it is often possible to recover at least some information using blind deconvolution techniques.
