= List of Japanese film studios =

Following is a list of Japanese movie studios, with their dates of operation.

== Active studios ==
- Japan Home Video
- ABC Animation, 2016
- Actas, 1998
- Ajiado, 1978
- Alice Japan, 1986
- Altamira Pictures, 1993
- Anime International Company, 1982
- Art Theatre Guild, 1961
- Arvo Animation, 2017
- Asahi Production, 1973
- Ashi Productions, 1975
- Asmik Ace, 1998
- Asread, 2003
- Atelier Pontdarc, 2020
- Athena Eizou, 1981
- Atlas21, 1981
- Attackers, 1996
- AXsiZ, 2011
- Bandai Namco Filmworks, 2022
- Bibury Animation Studios, 2017
- Bones, 1998
- Brain's Base, 1996
- Bridge, 2007
- Bug Films, 2021
- C-Station, 2009
- Children's Playground Entertainment, 2010
- Cine Bazar, 1994
- CineMagic Co., 1983
- CloverWorks, 2018
- Creators in Pack, 2013
- Crystal-Eizou, 1984
- Das, 2007
- David Production, 2007
- Diomedéa, 2007
- Doga Kobo, 1973
- Dogma, 2001
- East Fish Studio, 2017
- Eight Bit, 2008
- Eiken, 1969
- Fanworks, 2005
- Frontier Works, 1990
- Geek Pictures, 2017
- Glory Quest, 2000
- GoHands, 2008
- Happinet, 1992
- H.m.p. (aka Samm), 1981
- Hokuto Corporation, 1990
- Hot Entertainment, 1991
- ICHI Corporation (formerly Knack Productions), 1967
- IdeaPocket, 2002
- Iwanami Productions, 1950
- J.C.Staff, 1986
- Japan Home Video, 1984
- Kadokawa Corporation (formerly Kadokawa Dwango Corporation), 2014
- Kadokawa Daiei Studio, 2013
- Kindai Eiga Kyōkai, 1950
- KM Produce, 2002
- Kurosawa Film Studio, 1973
- Kyoto Animation, 1981
- Madhouse, Inc., 1972
- Madonna, 2002
- MAPPA, 2011
- Marza Animation Planet, 2005
- Max-A, 1992
- Maxing, 2006
- Moodyz, 2000
- Mushi Production, 1961
- Muteki, 2008
- Nikkatsu Corporation, 1912
- OP Eiga (aka Okura Pictures), 1961
- P.A. Works, 2000
- Production I.G, 1987
- S1 No. 1 Style, 2004
- Shin-Ei Animation, 1976
- Shintōhō Eiga, 1961
- Shochiku and Shochiku Studio, 1920
- Shuttle Japan, 2001
- Silver Link, 2007
- Soft On Demand, 1995
- Square Enix Image Studio Division
- Studio Ghibli, 1985
- Studio Pierrot, 1979
- Studio Ponoc, 2015
- Studio Signpost, 1959
- Studio Trigger, 2011
- Sunrise, 1972
- Sushi Typhoon, 2010
- Taishō Katsuei, 1920
- TMS Entertainment
- Toei Animation (aka Japan Animation Films and Toei Doga Co.), 1948
- Toei Company, 1951
- Toei Video, 2005
- Toho, 1933
- Toho Studios, 1971
- Total Media Agency, 1990
- Try-Heart Corporation, 1995
- Ufotable, 2000
- V&R Planning, 1986
- Waap Entertainment, 1998
- Wanz Factory, 2000
- Wit Studio, 2012
- Yokohama Animation Laboratory, 2015
- Yumeta Company, 1986

== Defunct movie studios ==
- 3Hz, 2013–2024
- A.P.P.P., 1984–2021
- Arms (aka Common Sense), 1996–2020
- Artmic, 1978–1997
- Bandai Namco Arts, 2018–2022, merged to form Bandai Namco Filmworks
- Bandai Visual, 1983–2018, merged to form Bandai Namco Arts
- Bee Train Production, 1997
- Cloud Hearts, 2021–2024
- Connect, 2012–2026
- Cross, 2005–2008
- Daiei Film, 1974–2002, merged into Kadokawa Daiei Studio
- Daiei Motion Picture Company (aka Dai Nippon Film Production), 1942–1971
- Dainichi Eihai, 1970–1971
- Ekachi Epilka, 2017–2025
- Fuji Television Enterprise (aka TV Douga and Japan Tele-Cartoons), 1963–1973
- Fukuhōdō, 1910–1912, merged to form Nikkatsu
- Gainax, 1984–2025
- Gathering, 2009–2022
- Geek Toys, 2017–2023
- Group TAC, 1968–2010
- Hal Film Maker, 1993–2009
- Jihō Eigasha, 1961-19??
- Kadokawa, 1945–2014, merged to form Kadokawa Dwango Corporation
- Kuki Inc., 1977–2017
- M. Pathe, 1906–1912, merged to form Nikkatsu
- Makino Film Productions, 1923–1929
- Manglobe, 2002–2015
- Manchukuo Film Association, 1937–1945
- Media Station, 1981–2011, merged into KM Produce
- Million Film, 1969–1988
- Nichido Film Co., 19xx ?–1956, acquired by Toei Company and reestablished as Toei Doga Co, (now Toei Animation)
- Ōizumi Eiga (Ōizumi Films), 19xx ?–1951, merged to form Toei Company
- Palm Studio, 1999–2007
- Production IMS, 2013–2018
- Radix, 1995–2001, merged to form Radix Ace Entertainment
- Radix Ace Entertainment, 2001–2006
- Real Works, 2005–2011, merged into KM Produce
- Shinkō Kinema, 1931–1941, merged to form Daiei Film
- Shintoho, 1947–1961
- Signal.MD, 2014–2025
- Studio Fantasia, 1983–2016
- Sunrise, Inc. (aka Nippon Sunrise), 1972–2022, merged to form Bandai Namco Filmworks
- Sunrise Beyond, 2019–2024
- Tear Studio, 2013–2019
- Teikoku Kinema, 19xx ?–1931
- Tennenshoku Katsudō Shashin, 1914–1919
- Tō-Yoko Eiga (Toyoko Eiga Company, Ltd.), 1938–1951, merged to form Toei Company
- Topcraft, 1972–1985
- Triangle Staff, 1987–2002
- Xebec, 1995–2019
- Yaoyorozu, 2013–2020
- Yokota Shōkai, 1901–1912, merged to form Nikkatsu
- Yoshizawa Shōten, 1897–1912, merged to form Nikkatsu
- Zero-G Room, 1991–2001, merged to form Radix Ace Entertainment

== See also ==
- Cinema of Japan
