= Wanz Factory =

Japanese adult video production company

- Industry: Pornography
- Founded: 2000
- Headquarters: Toshima, Tokyo, Japan
- Products: Pornographic films
- Number of employees: 20
- Website: http://www.wanz-factory.com/

Wanz Factory (ワンズファクトリー, Wanzu Fakutorī) is a Japanese adult video production company located in the Toshima ward of Tokyo, Japan.

== Company information ==
The company was founded in March 2000 and presently employs 20 people. Their adult videos are sold in more than 3,000 stores in Japan. Japanese adult video studios are usually divided into mainstream and independent types, the mainstream or "pro" studios such as Kuki, Alice Japan and h.m.p often being larger and older than the "indie" companies such as Soft On Demand, Cross, Dogma and Moodyz while the latter usually have less censorship and are more adventurous in their offerings. Wanz Factory is one of the indie companies with a specialty in AV Idol videos and large-busted "big boobs" models. The studio releases about 16-17 videos per month including some 10 new original works. The major Japanese video distributor DMM, a division of the Hokuto Corporation, listed more than 2000 DVD titles for Wanz Factory in September 2011.

== Labels ==
In addition to the Wanz Factory label, the company has also issued videos under the following label names:

- Ami
- Anz
- Bachika
- Body Works
- Hunter
- M-Mode
- Maniac World
- Mrs.Style
- Super Angle
- Virtual Angle

== Actresses ==
A number of prominent AV Idols have performed in Wanz Factory videos:

- Hotaru Akane
- Ami Ayukawa
- Serina Hayakawa
- Hikari Hino
- Rinako Hirasawa
- Sakurako Kaoru
- Mariko Kawana
- Ran Monbu
- Momoka Nishina
- Anna Ohura
- Nao Oikawa
- Maria Ozawa
- Akira Watase

== Series ==
Some popular Wanz Factory video series:

- Actress Restraint Maniac (女優-拘束マニア) – light bondage
- Bad Girl Declaration (悪女宣言)
- Celebrity Wife Restraint Training (セレブ妻拘束調教) – light bondage
- Hip & Vagina (お尻と性器)
- How To Perfect (徹底攻略)
- Private Body Inspection (プライベート女体観察)
- Super Angle of Manko (股間のアングル)
- Super Angle of Oppai (超-美乳のアングル)
- Uniform Trance (制服トランス)
- What Happens When a Woman's Orgasm Is Prolonged? (イカせ続けると女はどーなるのか?)

== AV Open / AV Grand Prix ==
Wanz Factory was one of the 19 AV companies which participated in the 2007 AV Open contest which began in May 2007 with the entry Delusional Clinic, Nakadashi Nurse Call (妄想クリニック 中出しナースコール) [OPEN-0718] starring Natsuki Iijima & Ryo Kiyohara. The company also entered the successor to the AV Open, the 2008 AV Grand Prix in December 2007 with First-Time Pure Nakadashi and Shaved Pussy (生まれてはじめての中出しとパイパン) [AVGP-043] starring Ayaka Sawajiri. For the 2009 AV Grand Prix contest, Wanz Factory nominated Roomshare (パイズリ狭射 トリプル痴女大乱交) [AVGP-150] co-starring busty actresses Hikari Hino, Akira Ichinose and Miruku Matsuzaka, and directed by Asao Takai.
