= Nao Oikawa =

Japanese actress

- 及川 奈央
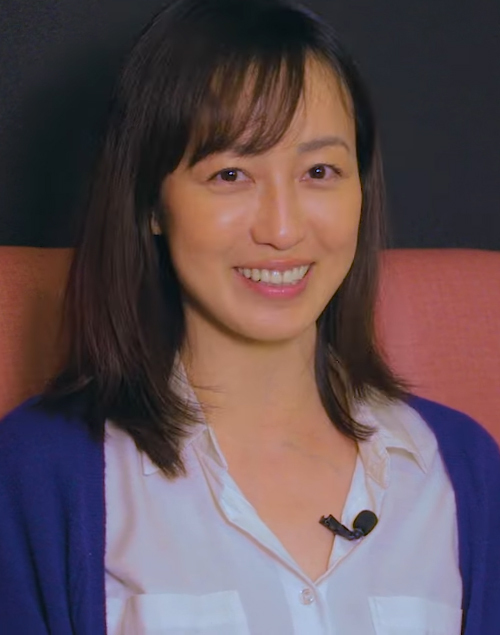
- Oikawa in 2022
- Born: April 21, 1981 (age 45); Hiroshima, Japan
- Other names: Oinao; Oichan; Naochi
- Occupations: Actress; TV Personality; AV idol
- Years active: 2000–present
- Height: 161 cm (5 ft 3 in)
- Website: oinao.com

Nao Oikawa (及川 奈央, Oikawa Nao; born April 21, 1981 in Hiroshima) is a Japanese actress, TV personality and was also a former AV idol who was very popular in the early 2000s.

== Life and career ==
Nao Oikawa was born in Hiroshima. Her family moved to Tokyo when she was a little girl. At age 18, when she graduated from high school and began design school, she met a scout who proposed she become an AV idol. "That time, my hair was bleached and curly. My agency told me to get my hair back to straight black. One day in the office, one staff picked Oikawa as family name from a book, another staff picked Nao from another book. This is where my stage name came from."

=== AV career ===
Debut

Oikawa's debut was not easy. AV producers did not think that she had special talent in their genre. She used her time for studying popular porn stars' acting (especially, she learned many things from Kurumi Morishita). Finally, Oikawa made her debut adult video at age nineteen for the Media Station Cosmos Plan label in September 2000. Then she released some videos from Alice Japan, Momotaro, etc., but she could not get big success. In her first year of adult work, she made only a few videos, including a softcore V-Cinema movie, Virgin Teacher Hinako in September 2001.

Taking off

In Spring 2002, Oikawa began an association with the new KMP Million label, most of them under the direction of Goro Tameike. She said that Tameike showed her the way to go. Her first video with KMP and Tameike, Another Side of Nao Oikawa, involved anal sex and forced fellatio. One of her male partners is famed porn actor Taka Kato About same time, she began to work with Soft On Demand and Moodyz which produced her most popular AV works. More than half of her AV work are produced in 2002.

KMP exclusive

In Spring 2003, Oikawa signed exclusive contract with KMP which continued until her retirement. Together with Ran Monbu, Saori Kamiya and Hitomi Hayasaka, she was part of the exclusive group of actresses that KMP used for promotion under the name "2003 Million Girls" (ミリオンガールズ2003, Miriongāruzu 2003). Another Side of Nao Oikawa 2, was even more hardcore with lesbian strap-on sex, forced fellatio and vomiting, multiple partner fellatio and vibrator play. Once again Taka Kato takes part in the action. On a gentler note, Oikawa appeared with Kurumi Morishita in a June 2003 production by KMP entitled Forest in Nude. Directed by TOHJIRO, this lesbian genre video is a "soft, bittersweet story of two friends who remember the days of their youth and the sexual experiences they had".

Popularity and recognition

At her peak, Oikawa was one of the most popular and well-known AV Idols in Japan. In 2003 (the earliest date available) she was #1 in the DMM list of the 100 top-ranked actresses by sales on their website. In 2004, even though she had retired in mid-year, she was still ranked #2, and even in 2005 she made the top 50 at #42. There have since been numerous re-issues and compilations of her earlier videos. Oikawa, along with fellow AV actress Mariko Kawana, actor Taka Kato, director Goro Tameike and Soft On Demand founder Ganari Takahashi, was among the 17 people interviewed for Misato Nakayama's study of professionals in the adult industry, 性職者の人々 あの世界の仕事師たち (Sei Shoku Sha No Hitobito Ano Sekai No Shigotoshi Tachi), published in January 2006 by Ohzora (ISBN 4-7767-9229-X).

In 2012, the major Japanese adult video distributor DMM held a poll of its customers to choose the 100 all-time best AV actresses to celebrate the 30th anniversary of adult videos in Japan. Oikawa finished in 42nd place in the voting.

=== Actress and TV personality ===
TV appearances

Like AV idols Nana Natsume and Sora Aoi, Oikawa has been able to use her fame in the AV industry to enter mainstream media work. Soon after her retirement from adult videos, she acted in and directed an episode of the Japanese TV horror series Fantazuma: Cursed House or Fantazuma: Noroi no yakata (ファンタズマ〜呪いの館〜) which aired on TV Tokyo in July 2004. She also played a role in the 2004 comedy-horror TV series The Great Horror Family (怪奇大家族, Kaiki daikazoku) directed by Takashi Shimizu on TV Tokyo. From 2005 to 2006, Oikawa appeared on various midnight TV show including Ikari Oyaji 3.

SFX actress

On November 11, 2005 Oikawa made a guest appearance in the 6th episode of GARO. It was her first appearance on Tokusatsu sfx series. GARO's action director Makoto Yokoyama says Oikawa's supple body is suitable to sfx action. On November 9, 2007 she made a guest appearance in the 6th episode of Tsuburaya Productions mini-series Ultraseven X.Oikawa was cast as Negi's advisor "Shizuna Minamoto" in the 2007-08 late-night TV Tokyo series Negima!: Magister Negi Magi based on the manga of the same name about a young male wizard from Wales (Negi, played by a 13-year-old girl) and his 31 female students.

Not same as above are all midnight dramas, Oikawa played the role of villainess Kegalesia in the TV Asahi tokusatsu TV series for kids Engine Sentai Go-onger which ran from February 17, 2008, through February 8, 2009. In the September 21, 2008 episode, Oikawa and her co-stars Rina Aizawa and Yumi Sugimoto teamed up as the one-off G3 Princess singing group, releasing both an EP and a CD box set featuring the group's song G3 Princess Rap ~Pretty Love Limited~ and Oikawa's solo character song Utopia. She also appeared in the Kamen Rider Decade epilogue portion of the December 2009 film Kamen Rider × Kamen Rider W & Decade: Movie War 2010 as the Bee Woman of Shocker.

Other activities

From November to December 2007 Oikawa performed her first lead stage role in a three-person drama called Night Mess. In September 2010 she will take a role in a vampire drama called Blood Prisoner. Some staff members and actors in both dramas are tokusatsu specialists.

Oikawa's family enjoys playing Mahjong as a recreational activity. As a result, she has over 20 years' experience playing the game. Using this experience, she frequently appears in Mahjong related V-Cinemas, TV shows, and various events.

== Filmography ==
=== Film and V-Cinema ===
Title	Company	Director	Release date	Notes
Virgin Teacher Hinako 処女教師 日菜子	GP Museum	Takashi Achiwa	August 20, 2001	Role: Hinako
Ninja Vixens: Flame Of Seduction くノ一忍法伝 華艶淫火 ～女淫血風抄～	Engel	Daiji Hattori	February 16, 2002	Role: Shizuku
PLAYBALL	GP Museum	Maccoi Saito	August 3, 2002	Role: Natsu
Capone, The Emperor Of Alchemy In Roppongi カポネ 六本木錬金の帝王	M3	Shingo Yamashiro	February 14, 2004	Role: Ryoko Tachibana
The path of carnage 10: Full Scale War In Kyushu 修羅のみち10 九州全面戦争	Knack	Keiichi Ozawa	May 1, 2004	Role: Yuka
Maggy's Dog Jr.	ICF	Kengo Kaji	March 18, 2005	Role: Lady Maggy
Tsukiko, An Undertaker 葬儀屋月子〜ある葬儀屋の告白〜	EZ Channel	Hiroki Yamaguchi	October 2005	Role: Tsukiko
No Pants Girls: Movie Boxing	Omega Project	Sion Sono	November 12, 2005	Role: Airi Kanno
Tsukiko, A Nurse 看護師月子〜ある看護師の告白〜	EZ Channel	Takayuki Sato	January 2006	Role: Tsukiko
Crab Goalkeeper	BBMC	Minoru Kawasaki	May 26, 2006	Role: Nami
Dekotora No Shu 4 デコトラの鷲 其の四 愛と涙の男鹿半島	Fresh Hearts	Hideyuki Katsuki	April 21, 2007	Role: Straycat Nancy
Mukoubuchi むこうぶち	GP Museum	Shuji Kataoka	June 25, 2007	Role: Shiori
Mukoubuchi 2, The Wilderness Where Demon Lives むこうぶち2 鬼の棲む荒野	GP Museum	Shuji Kataoka	July 25, 2007	Role: Shiori
Mukoubuchi 3 Underground gambler むこうぶち3 裏プロ	GP Museum	Shuji Kataoka	April 25, 2008	Role: Shiori
Mukoubuchi 4 Saloon Killer むこうぶち4 雀荘殺し	GP Museum	Shuji Kataoka	June 25, 2008	Role: Shiori
Engine Sentai Go-onger: Bom bom! Bom bom Net de Bom!!	Toei		July 11, 2008	Role: Kegalesia
Engine Sentai Go-onger: Boom Boom! Bang Bang! GekijōBang!!	Toei	Noboru Takemoto	August 9, 2008	Role: Kegalesia, a mistress
Mukoubuchi 5 Ice Man むこうぶち5 氷の男	GP Museum	Shuji Kataoka	December 25, 2008	Role: Shiori
Engine Sentai Go-onger vs. Gekiranger	Toei	Satoshi Morota	January 24, 2009	Role: Kegalesia
Mukoubuchi 6 Whoremaster むこうぶち6 女衒打ち	GP Museum	Shuji Kataoka	December 25, 2008	Role: Shiori
Miss Machiko, the Movie: A Busty and Undefeatable Delinquent Girl 実写版 まいっちんぐマチコ先生 無敵のおっぱい番長	TMC	Ataru Ueda	July 17, 2009	Role: Head teacher Ishizu
TOGETHER	T&M	Kazuaki Mutou	September 5, 2009	Role: a nurse
Kamen Rider × Kamen Rider W & Decade: Movie War 2010	Toei	Ryuta Tasaki	December 12, 2009	Role: Bee Woman
Samurai Sentai Shinkenger vs. Go-onger: GinmakuBang!!	Toei	Shojiro Nakazawa	January 30, 2010	Role: Kegalesia
Mukoubuchi 7 Hidden Tiles むこうぶち7 筋殺し	GP Museum	Shuji Kataoka	March 25, 2010	Role: Shiori
Sir!! May I Go To Toilet?? 裁判長!トイレ行ってきていいすか	Aniplex	Jun Shiozaki	August 27, 2010	Role: Nobuko Makimura
Mukoubuchi 8 The Evil Eye むこうぶち8 邪眼	GP Museum	Shuji Kataoka	December 17, 2010	Role: Shiori
Kaizoku Sentai Gokaiger the Movie: The Flying Ghost Ship	Toei	Katsuya Watanabe	August 6, 2011	Role: Kegalesia
Kaizoku Sentai Gokaiger vs. Space Sheriff Gavan: The Movie	Toei	Shojiro Nakazawa	January 21, 2012	Role: Kegalesia
Mighty Lady - The Series	Mighty Lady production committee	Ichiro Omomo	March 31, 2012	Role: Sister
WONOGAWA	WONOGAWA production committee	Hiroki Yamaguchi	April 6, 2013	Role: Tomura Chinuno
Death Trap - Law of Death	Rakuso-sya	Kazuhiro Yokoyama	September 4, 2013	Role: Death
Heroine Pinch Omnibus 24 -Fighter of the Sun Leona MAMA ヘロイピンチ総集編24 太陽の戦士レオナMAMA	Zen Pictures	Kanzo Matsuura	May 24, 2019	Role: Shoko Kirishima
Where the Heart is 心のありか	ACRAFT	Miyuki Uehara	December 15, 2023	Role: Ikuko Sakai

=== TV Drama ===
Title	Network	Director	Release date	Notes
Fantasma: Cursed Residence: episode 3 ファンタズマ〜呪いの館〜	TV Tokyo	Nao Oikawa	August 2004	Director, a shopkeeper
The Great Horror Family 怪奇大家族	TV Tokyo	Takashi Shimizu, Kenji Murakami, Keisuke Toyoshima, Yûdai Yamaguchi	October to December 2004	Role: various women
30 minutes: episode 2	TV Tokyo	Hitoshi Ohne	October 2004	Role: Ayumi
Deep Love Host	TV Tokyo	Hideo Nanbu	January 17 to March 18, 2005	Role: Sara
Heroine is born ヒロイン誕生	TV Osaka		July 2005 to March 2006	Role: Nao
GARO: episode 6	TV Tokyo	Kengo Kaji	November 11, 2005	Role: Kotomi
A King At Night: episode 6 夜王	TBS	Masahiro Sakai	February 17, 2006	Role: Marin
Pleasure Master: episode 1 快感職人	TV Asahi		July 8, 2006	Role: Yukari
Girl From Hell: episode 7 地獄少女	Nihon TV		December 2006	Role: Kiriko Matsui
Negima! Magister Negi Magi 魔法先生ネギま!	TV Tokyo	Ryu Kaneda	October 3, 2007 to March 26, 2008	Role: Shizuna Minamoto
Ultraseven X: episode 6: Traveler	CBC	Kengo Kaji	November 9, 2007	Role: Arisa
Edison's Mama: episode 6 エジソンの母	TBS	Jun Muto	February 15, 2008	Role: magic teacher in a book
Engine Sentai Go-onger	TV Asahi		February 17, 2008 to February 8, 2009	Role: Kegalesia (GP1-GP49), Nao Kiyomizu (GP-FINAL)
Coelacanth Murder Case シーラカンス殺人事件	Fuji TV		November 27, 2009	Role: a nightclub hostess
Taiga drama Ryōmaden: episode 4	NHK	Keishi Ootomo	January 24, 2010	Role: Shino
Uchû inusakusen: episode 4	TV Tokyo	Kouichi Hamaya	August 13, 2010	Role: Monroe
Garo: Yami o Terasu Mono: episode 11	TV Tokyo	Mitsuyoshi Abe	June 15, 2013	Role: Boara
Aristocratic Bachelor: episode 3	Fuji TV	Makoto Hirano	October 24, 2013	Role: Sakurako Kamino

=== Variety DVD ===
Title	Company	Genre	Release date	Notes
Mourning Mr. Kendo Kobayashi 追悼ケンドーコバヤシさん	YOSHIMOTO WORKS	Conte	October 26, 2005	Role: The widow of Kendo Kobayashi
Full Of Trouble 2, Life of Comedians 原口あきまさの波乱万場2	ShowTime	Conte	July 19, 2009	Role: Miss "O"
IS YOUR SEX HAPPY? あなたのセックスは幸せですか	GP Museum	How to	October 25, 2009	Supervising adviser
Queen Fuji Cup the 1st mah-jong tournament 第1回麻雀女王トーナメント	GP Museum	Mahjong	April 16, 2010	MC
The mah-jong title match 2011 - celebrity's primary 麻雀最強戦2011 著名人代表決定戦	Takeshobo	Mahjong	September 2, 2011	Player
The mah-jong title match 2012 - celebrity's primary 麻雀最強戦2012 著名人代表決定戦・風神編	Takeshobo	Mahjong	September 7, 2012	Player
The mah-jong title match 2013 - final 麻雀最強戦2013	Takeshobo	Mahjong	March 5, 2014	Player

=== Adult videos ===
Video title	Company	Director	Release date	Notes
Honeybee's Mischief みつばちの悪戯	Cosmos Plan	WATARUX	September 30, 2000	Debut (1)
Indecent Woods 露骨な森のエロス	Cosmos Plan	Toru Kosakai	October 29, 2000	(1)
My StepSister is a Beautiful Nurse お義姉さんは美・看護婦	Alice Japan Babylon	Shigeo Katsuyama	December 22, 2000	(2), (3)
Uniform Doll 制服人形(コスプレドール)	Alice Japan	Yuji Sakamoto	January 23, 2001	(2), (3)
Bejean 12	Momotaro		May 25, 2001	(4)
I Satisfy Your Wish コスプレックス	Momotaro		October 24, 2001	(4)
How to Perfect 徹底攻略	Wanz Factory		November 1, 2001	(5)
AA.II ア～イ～	Shy Plan	Kyuhei Tsubakihara	November 30, 2001	
The Hypnotism Fuck of Nao Oikawa 催眠FUCK	MidnightBlue		December 2001	CS TV series (1), (13)
Wild Thing IV	Momotaro	Butta Sato	December 20, 2001	(4)
Give Up Human Being 人間廃業	Alice Japan Babylon	Kunihiro Hasegawa	December 21, 2001	(2), (3)
AV Model Recipe 15; AV虎の穴-AV女優の作り方	Wanz Factory		January 1, 2002	(5)
Obscene Model 猥褻モデル	Alice Japan	Kyuhei Tsubakihara	January 18, 2002	(2)
Fallen Angel X 堕天使Ｘ	Media Station Bazooka	Daimei Kurata	February 10, 2002	(1)
Black Date	Wanz Factory	Mitsuru Shibahara	February 28, 2002	(5)
Illusion Nurse/Beautiful Ass Nurse 妄想ナース/美尻ナース	Marx Princess	Kei Morikawa	March 23, 2002	(5)
First Fuckin' Baby 柏の森で会いましょう	Moodyz	DAICHI	April 1, 2002	(6), (7), (15)
She Is A Forbidden Elder 僕のお姉さん	TMA		April 12, 2002	(8)
Canned Peach, The Real Face Of "Wild Thing"ers 桃の缶詰 ワイルドシンガーの素顔	Momotaro		April 17, 2002	Omunibus
Dream Woman 5	Moodyz	Alala Kurosawa	May 1, 2002	(6), (7), (14)
Implication Nao Oikawa 裏・及川奈央	KMP Million	Goro Tameike	May 17, 2002	(9), (12)
Super High-Class Soap Lady 超高級ソープ嬢	SOD	Hajime Yarigasaki	May 17, 2002	(10)
Dream High School Vol.5 ドリーム学園VOL.5	Moodyz	Daikei Shimizu	June 1, 2002	With Nanami Yusa (6), (15)
Angel 97	Idea Pocket	Taiyo Shibato	June 8, 2002	(14)
Handjob Helper aka Masturbation Aid オナニーのお手伝いしてあげる	SOD	Yuji Sakamoto	June 21, 2002	(10)
Crime and Punishment 罪と罰	VIP	Juzo Kamonohashi	June 21, 2002	
Prohibition 禁断	Media Bank		June 28, 2002	
Nymph's Kiss 超☆美少女接吻	Natural High		July 5, 2002	Omunibus Lesbian
The Lady Panther 2 女豹2	Attackers Shark	Kaito Ashihara	July 8, 2002	(14)
Beauty Female Doctor 美人女医・淫虐病棟 白濁色にまみれて	SOD	Nomao Yonezu	July 19, 2002	(10)
When Nao is My Pet もしも及川奈央が僕のペットだったら・・・	KMP Million	Goro Tameike	July 19, 2002	(9), (12)
Exposure at the Pachinko Parlor パチンコパーラーで露出!	Virtual Wave		July 23, 2002	
Super Angle of Manko 超-股間のアングル	Wanz Factory		August 1, 2002	(5)
Female Teacher Pet Chapter 5 僕だけの女教師ペット 第５章	SOD	Hideto Aki	August 4, 2002	(10)
Yukata Festival 夏祭り！ゆかた美人大集合	Momotaro		August 10, 2002	Omunibus (4)
How is an Indecent Female 淫らな雌はいかがですか?	Moodyz	Koushiro	August 15, 2002	(6), (7), (15)
Costume Play Busty Idol コスプレ巨乳アイドル	KMP Million	Nimura Hitoshi	August 16, 2002	
FACE 51	AUDAZ JAPAN		August 23, 2002	(11)
Hip & Vagina 4 お尻と性器	Wanz Factory		September 1, 2002	(5)
Pleads for Pudding おねだりプリン	SOD		September 6, 2002	(10)
The Lustful Female Vol. 19 雌女	AUDAZ JAPAN		September 6, 2002	(11)
Gold Member	Activ 1		September 10, 2002	With Miri Sugihara
Tasted Nao Oikawa's Big Tits 及川奈央の巨乳を味わえ！！	KMP Million	Goro Tameike	September 20, 2002	(9), (12)
Digital Mosaic Vol.005	Moodyz	Rinya	October 1, 2002	(6), (7), (15)
Uki Uki Watching うきうきウオッチング	GOGO's		October 2, 2002	
Virginity Student Hunting 新・童貞狩り 第3章	SOD	Kei Morikawa	October 19, 2002	(10)
Violent Shoot 激射 vol.22	AUDAZ JAPAN		October 25, 2002	(11)
Shove to The Hilt コスプレ及川奈央	TMA		October 25, 2002	(8)
Actress Restraint Maniac 女優・拘束マニア	Wanz Factory		November 1, 2002	(5)
Super Angle of Oppai 超-美乳のアングル	Wanz Factory		November 1, 2002	(5)
My Only Big Tit Mama 3 僕だけの巨乳ママ3	Waap Entertainment	KINGDOM	November 8, 2002	
Idol Semen Vol.8	SOD	Takaki Goto	November 20, 2002	(10)
Fan Festa Hotspring Bus Tour ファン感謝温泉バスツアー	KMP Million	Goro Tameike	November 22, 2002	
LOVE pussy [Side.A] LOVE potion ナース淫欲病棟	meltyKiss		November 30, 2002	aka Nurse Nao
Sweet pussy [Side.B] Sweet lesson 女教師淫欲教室	meltyKiss		November 30, 2002	aka Teacher Nao
Sex Wars 1	Moodyz	Rintaro Ise	December 1, 2002	With Akira Watase, Moe Nishimura (6), (15)
Another Side Of Black Date 裏ブラックデート	Wanz Factory	Mitsuru Shibahara	December 1, 2002	
Beauty Bust Nurse's Sexual Harassment 看護娼婦	Dream Ticket	Goro Tameike	December 5, 2002	
VIP Shower 3	Waap Entertainment Beauty	[Jo]Style	December 6, 2002	With Mirai Hoshizaki & Miyuki Hourai
Dream Contest of W Cast	Wanz Factory		December 10, 2002	With Miyuki Horai
If Nao Oikawa Was My Girlfriend... もしも及川奈央がぼくの彼女だったら・・・	KMP Million	Goro Tameike	December 13, 2002	(9), (12)
Wet Seethrough 濡れてスケスケ	Bunny's Bunny		January 1, 2003	
Crazy Tongue 舌狂	h.m.p. Samm	Ryutaro Kanno	January 28, 2003	With Akira Watase
Whole Nao Oikawa まるごと及川奈央	SOD		February 6, 2003	(10)
Let Do Sex In High-School With Nao Oikawa 及川奈央と学校でしようよ!	GLAY'z		February 7, 2003	
Lady Snowblood 修羅雪姫	Trans		February 20, 2003	
Make A Play Of Nao Oikawa 極・本番	GLAY'z		February 21, 2003	
Amateur Club 素人倶楽部	Obtain Future		February 24, 2003	Divided into 7 titles.
4 Hours with Nao Oikawa 及川奈央 ４時間	KMP Million	Hideto Aki	April 25, 2003	(9), (12)
Spanking Girls	KMP Million	Goro Tameike	May 23, 2003	With Hitomi Hasegawa
Keep On Flash Pleasure In Four Hours 完全なるイカセ４時間	KMP Million	Goro Tameike	June 20, 2003	(9), (12)
Forest in Nude ヌードの森 〜メモワール レズビアン〜	KMP Million	TOHJIRO	June 27, 2003	Lesbian With Kurumi Morishita
Magical Mystery Tour	KMP Million	Goro Tameike	July 25, 2003	With Hitomi Hayasaka, Ran Monbu, Hitomi Hasegawa, Saori Kamiya (9)
24 Charisma Idols	KMP Million		July 25, 2003	Omunibus
Les Quatre cents coups 2003 大人は判ってくれない２００３	KMP Million	Rintaro Ise	August 29, 2003	With Hitomi Hayasaka, Ran Monbu (9)
Another Side of Nao Oikawa 2 裏・及川奈央２	KMP Million	Goro Tameike	September 26, 2003	(9), (12)
High Class Super Healing Soap Land 超高級癒し系おもてなしソープランド	KMP Million	Goro Tameike	October 24, 2003	(9), (12)
You Are My Brothers Wife 兄貴の嫁さん	KMP Million	Goro Tameike	November 28, 2003	(9), (12)
Molester Story 痴漢物語	KMP Million	Goro Tameike	December 26, 2003	(9), (12)
8 Hours with Nao Oikawa 及川奈央 ８時間	KMP Million	Hideto Aki	February 28, 2004	(12)
Special 4 Hours with Super Stars 完全撮りおろしスーパースター4時間SPECIAL	KMP Million		April 23, 2004	Omunibus
If Nao Was My Girlfriend... 2 もしも及川奈央が僕の彼女だったら・・・２	KMP Million	Hideto Aki	April 30, 2004	(9), (12)
The Woman Called Nao ＮＡＯと呼ばれた女	KMP Million	Goro Tameike	June 25, 2004	With nao. (9)

- Note
  - (1) Cosmos Plan: Partially included in "Maximum Nao Oikawa"(ASIN:B0029AJQ2C).
  - (2) Alice Japan: Partially included in "Alice Pink File Nao Oikawa"(ASIN:B003L14PME).
  - (3) Alice Japan: Remastered and reproduced with original title.
  - (4) Momotaro: Included in "Scramble" 1, 2(ASIN:B001HQLV36, B001KEM0GM).
  - (5) TMA: Included in "Nao Oikawa History History 16 Hours"(ASIN:B003BLEARY).
  - (6) Moodyz: Partially included in "Hyper Digital Mosaic 4 Hours"(ASIN:B000M9BN7S).
  - (7) Moodyz: Included in "Perfect Collection 8 Hours"(ASIN:B001W00692).
  - (8) TMA: Remastered and reproduced with original title.
  - (9) KMP: Remastered and reproduced with original title ('Timeless masterpiece' series).
  - (10) SOD: Partially included in "Digital Remaster Director's Cut 8 Hours"(ASIN:B003U3NAMO).
  - (11) AUDAZ JAPAN: Remastered and reproduced with original title.
  - (12) KMP: Partially included in "All About Nao Oikawa" 1, 2(ASIN:B002C8YURC, B002F7IAC6).
  - (13) Maxing: Included in "Star File Nao Oikawa"(ASIN:B004B7ZRT2).
  - (14) ROOKIE: Included in "Kiseki - Nao Oikawa Super Collection 8 Hours Special".
  - (15) ROOKIE: Partially included in "Kiseki - Nao Oikawa Super Collection 8 Hours Special".

== Talk show ==
Title	Network	Date	Notes
Pouring & Coming ぶっかけ☆イッたっしょ!?	CS Nippon	April, 2003 to March 2004	Erotic TV show where Oikawa was MC and she did not perform any erotic act.
13 contes about destruction of human race 人類滅亡と13のコント集	Nihon TV	October 2004 to March 2005	Role: Maha-Virocana Buddha
Dragon Gate 登竜門	Fuji TV	2004 to 2005	Talking, Singing and Dancing with Sora Aoi, Nana Natsume, etc.
I’m speaking here! おしゃべりやってまーす	K’z station	September 2004 to October, 2005	
Nao on Sale	Local radio stations	2005 to 2007	
Angry Old Men 怒りオヤジ	TV Tokyo	April, 2005 to March 2009	
Premier ぷれミーヤ	TV Asahi	2006 to 2008	
Too Naturally 自然体にもほどがある	Gyao Jocky	March 16, 2007 to August 28, 2009	With Rei Kinukawa
Push 80 percent, Pull 20 percent 8押して2引け	Pokela	June 11 to December 17, 2009	
Tonight's dollar box S 今夜もドル箱Ｓ	TV Tokyo	April, 2011 (continuing)	

== Stage ==
Title	Playwright/Director	Date	Theater	Notes
Checkmate	Masuo Hasumi	April to May 31, 2005	Umeda Kagetsu (Osaka)	
Shimurakon	Ken Shimura/La Salle Ishii	April 6 to 30, 2006	Tokyo Metropolitan Theatre; Cyunichi Theater (Nagoya)	
Night Mess	Yuji Kobayashi/Kengo Kaji	November 21 to December 23, 2007	14 Livehouses in Niigata, Kōriyama, Ishinomaki, Sendai, Nagano, Nagoya, Kobe, Tokyo, Hamamatsu, Okayama, Osaka, Kumamoto, Fukuoka, Hiroshima	Role: Saki (leading role)
Blood Prisoner	Kengo Kaji	August 31 to September 5, 2010	Ebisu Echo Theater (Tokyo)	Role: Miyabi Jinguji
Angel Heart	Tsukasa Hojo/Seiki Watanabe	October 2, 2010	Kichijōji Theatre (Tokyo)	With Yumi Sugimoto; Role: Saeko Nogami
15-0 Fifteen Love	Tetsuhiro Ikeda	June 1 to 19, 2011	Ekimae Theater (Shimokitazawa, Tokyo); HEP HALL (Umeda, Osaka)	With comedy conte unit "Hyogen Sawayaka"
Women's feeling	Tomoki Kanazawa/Nao Oikawa/Megumi Kuge	September 15 to 18, 2011	Theater HOPE (Nakano, Tokyo)	Two Person Show with Megmi Kuge
HOLSTEIN KILLER NEVER DIE!!	Ken Arima	February 15 to 19, 2012	The Pocket (Nakano, Tokyo)	With "Kaiketsu Pandars"; Role: Ai Sasayaka
AI-NIKU	Scenario writers group "Dra-Kichi"	March 8 to 11, 2012	SAMSA ASAGAYA (Tokyo)	Role: Fortune-teller Mitsumi
Royal Straight Flush	Tetsuhiro Ikeda	June 24 to July 8, 2012	Honda Theater (Shimokitazawa, Tokyo); ABC HALL (Fukushima-ku, Osaka)	With comedy conte unit "Hyogen Sawayaka"
Evil Women	Ayako Kitagawa, Makoto Ozeki	September 20 to 23, 2012	RABINEST (Takadanobaba, Tokyo)	Two Person Show with Megmi Kuge
Tokyo Eccentric Explosion	Miyuki Torii, Hirohide Sumida	April 17 to 21, 2013	Space Zero(Yoyogi, Tokyo)	LIBERUS Produce, Tokyo Guillotine Club
Tokaido Girls	Tetsuhiro Ikeda	August 29 to September 1, 2013	THEATER BRATS(Shinjuku, Tokyo)	Two Person Show with Megmi Kuge
Say Hello to "Say Hello to Black Jack"	Shuho Sato, Kentaro Ono	September 11 to 16, 2013	Theater Sun-mall(Shinjuku, Tokyo)	Role: Masae Kawamukai
Curse	Yoshimi Tokui, Yohei Yamazaki	November 27 to December 1, 2013	Red Theater(Akasaka, Tokyo)	Role: Kekomi Nagi
7EVEN LOVERS	Akira Watanabe	March 18 to 23, 2014	Yorozu Gekijo(Otsuka, Tokyo)	Role: Wizar (leading role)

== Photobooks ==
Title	Company	Photographer	Date	Notes
OIKAWA NAO PORTRAITS	Futabasya	Seiichi Nomura	June 2001	
MOON FLOWER	Bauhouse	Hiroyuki Yoshida	October, 2002	
NAKED HEART ハダカノココロ	Bunkasya	Shinichiro Koike	June 2003	
A GODDESS 女神	Futabasya	Shoken Takahashi	December 2003	
DOCILE(NATURE OF NAO); Su-Nao	Wani Books	Kouki Nishida	June 2005	her last nude photobook
G3 PRINCESS VISUAL BOOK	Gakusyu Kenkyusya	Junichiro Shimokawa	October, 2008	With Rina Aizawa, Yumi Sugimoto

== Discography ==
Title	Company	Date	Notes
Shei Shei Shake 謝・謝・Shake	BMG Japan	November 23, 2005	"Shei Shei Shake" "Oyasumi"
Engine Sentai Go-onger G3 Princess CD-BOX	Columbia Music Entertainment	October 1, 2008	"G3 Princess Rap - PRETTY LOVE Limited" with Rina Aizawa, Yumi Sugimoto "Utopia"
Appare Ba-Ban-Bang!	Bellwood Records	October 26, 2011	"Appare Ba-Ban-Bang!" "Kame-sama, please"

== Miscellaneous ==
- Miku and Ran: Scenario for cartoon on internet. Serialized from March 2009.
- NAO OIKAWA'S FRUIT SCANDAL - Pachinko Machine (Heiwa Corporation): From 2009 summer to 2010 winter, for 3 versions, total 20,000 machines supposed to be shipped.
- A Letter from Ancient Capital Kyoto
  古都便り: Photograph, Reading poetry by Nao Oikawa, Music by Tsugutoshi Goto, Phone-Cast from April 27, 2010.

== Sources ==
- "Nao Oikawa Official Web Site" (in Japanese). www.oinao.com. Archived from the original on 2010-02-13.
- "Nao Oikawa". IMdB.
- 及川奈央 女優紹介 (in Japanese). K.M.Produce. Archived from the original on 2010-08-30.
- "GO-ONGER INTERVIEW 12 及川奈央" (in Japanese). 東映ヒーローネット. January 5, 2009. Archived from the original on June 29, 2011.
- 及川奈央のぶっちゃけホンネとーく (in Japanese). plus-U. August 2007 – April 2008. Archived from the original on 2011-07-22.
- 及川奈央のファッションアルバム (in Japanese). NAVER. Archived from the original on 2010-01-02.
