= Goro Tameike =

Japanese adult video director (born 1964)

- Born: March 28, 1964 (age 62); Japan
- Occupations: Film director Screenwriter
- Years active: 1994 –
- Website: http://blog.livedoor.jp/tameikegoro/

Goro Tameike (溜池ゴロー, Tameike Gorō) is a Japanese adult video (AV) director who has directed more than 450 videos. He was one of the first exponents of the "mature woman" (熟女, jukujō) genre in AV.

== Life and career ==
Goro Tameike was born on March 28, 1964. He graduated from the Law School of Meiji University. After working as an assistant director, he began directing adult videos from as early as 1994 for the Max-A Samansa label. Tameike has had a long association with Soft On Demand (SOD) and he directed the September 1999 SOD release 34 Year Old Mother Mariko, the debut video of his future wife, Mariko Kawana. Japanese AV columnist Kemuta Otsubo marks this as one of the earliest adult videos in the "mature woman" (熟女) genre although older women had previously appeared in theatrical porn films. Tameike was to take the "Beautiful Mature Woman" (美熟女) genre as his own. He has said in an interview that a Mature Woman is not the same as an "old woman", the Mature Woman has become beautiful through her life experiences.

When SOD director Tohjiro left that company to form his own studio Dogma in February 2001, Tameike started working for the new company as a director. In April 2002, Tameike also joined the newly independent company KM Produce (KMP) and directed a number of works for the studio, many of them featuring AV Idols Nao Oikawa and Hitomi Hayasaka. Tameike also directed for Moodyz where he had his own label "Goro Tameike" beginning in December 2003. Tameike has also written and directed a number of soft-core erotic V-Cinema productions, several starring Mariko Kawana.

In August 2003 Tameike married Mariko Kawana and he directed her retirement video Mariko Last Love which was released by Moodyz in March 2004. Their son was born in November 2004.

Tameike and his wife Kawana were among the 17 people interviewed for Misato Nakayama's study of professionals in the adult industry, Sei Shoku Sha No Hitobito Ano Sekai No Shigotoshi Tachi (性職者の人々 あの世界の仕事師たち), published January 2006 by Ohzora (ISBN 4-7767-9229-X).

Tameike started his own video production company, named Goro Tameike, in 2006 with the first videos being released in February 2006.

== Awards ==
2004 KMP Million Academy Awards

- Academy Award Prize for The Woman Called Nao
- Award for Excellence for Best Friend 2
- Award for Excellence for It's the Occupation of Million's Girls!

2006 Moodyz Awards

- Best Director Award 3rd Place

2007 Vegas Night

- Best Director Award 3rd Place

2008 AV Grand Prix

- Best Mature Video with Sayuri Shiraishi, Stepmother Slave

2009 AV Grand Prix

- Special Award - Mature Woman Video with Ayane Asakura, Slave Mother-in-Law

2014 AV Open

- Middleweight Class Second Place Award - 27-Year-Old Talent Married For Five Years, She's Taking Non-Nude Erotica to the Limit (結婚5年目 27歳 人妻タレント 決意の限界着エロ 東 凛) starring Rin Azuma

== Goro Tameike (Company) ==
In 2006 Tameike started his own adult video production company, named Goro Tameike, which released its first productions in February 2006. The company is part of the large Japanese porn conglomerate, the Hokuto Corporation, and it markets its products through Hokuto's sales outlet, the DMM website. The studio releases about seven to eight original videos per month, mostly directed by Tameike. Their works are primarily in the Mature Woman genre.

The Moodyz studio used a special "Goro Tameike" label for videos directed by Tameike which used product codes of the type "MDYD-xxx", with MDYD-001, Beautiful Mature Woman Illustrated starring Reona Azabu, being released in December 2003. The Moodyz video Long Legged Mature Woman with Mayumi Kusunoki was coded MDYD-032 and when Tameike founded his own company, its videos continued using the same sequence starting with MDYD-033 for A Friend's Mother starring Risa Kaneko.

The Goro Tameike studio entered videos in the 2008 and 2009 AV Grand Prix competitions. Their 2008 entry Sayuri Shiraishi, Stepmother Slave won the Best Mature Video award, and their 2009 nominee, Slave Mother-in-Law, won a Special Award in the Mature Woman Video category. The company also entered the 2014 AV Open competition where its video 27-Year-Old Talent Married For Five Years, She's Taking Non-Nude Erotica to the Limit won the Middleweight Class Second Place Award.

== Sources ==
- "Goro Tameike DMM Filmography" (in Japanese).
- "Goro Tameike Official Blog" (in Japanese).
- "Goro Tameike (Company) Filmography".
- "Goro Tameike (Company) DMM Filmography" (in Japanese).
- "Goro Tameike (Company) Website" (in Japanese). Archived from the original on 2010-04-29.
