= Tohjiro =

Japanese pornographic film director (1956–2026)

TOHJIRO
- Born: Chishō Itō; June 17, 1956; Tokyo, Japan
- Died: July 17, 2026 (aged 70)
- Occupations: Film director, screenwriter
- Years active: 1987–2026

Tohjiro or TOHJIRO (June 17, 1956 – July 17, 2026) was a Japanese adult video (AV) director and the founder of the AV studio Dogma.

== Life and career ==
Tohjiro, whose real name is Chishō Itō (伊藤智生), was born in June 17, 1956 in the Roppongi district of Tokyo. He started out as an independent film director. He wrote and directed the film Gondola (ゴンドラ), which was released theatrically in October 1987 and later as a DVD. The film won him the Best New Director award at the 1988 Yokohama Film Festival.

=== Early AV career ===
Tohjiro made his first AV in 1989 (released in January 1990) titled Blue Film (ブルーフィルム) and starring early AV Idol Nao Saejima for Kaoru Adachi's recently founded studio V&R Planning. His December 1991 video for V&R Planning, New Female Teacher Special: Dangerous Sailor Story After School, was the first of a long and popular series.

In the first half of the 1990s decade, in addition to V&R Planning, Tohjiro also directed for several other early AV studios including VIP, Cosmos Plan, Alice Japan, Max-A and Kuki. During this period, Tohjiro made videos covering most of the common styles and genres popular in Japanese pornography including cosplay (Uniform Connection 13 & Uniform Connection 16), anal sex (Fall of the Virgin), simulated rape (Ayano Kotobuki in Sexy Teacher Hunt) and vibrator and vegetable play (Erotic Sensuality, Shocking Fuck). He also made some early works with bondage themes for CineMagic including an entry in the CineMagic "Immoral Angel" series, the September 1996 Immoral Angel 25, and one for the "Slave Secretary" series, Abnormal Privacy: Slave Secretary 16, in January 1997.

He celebrated his 200th video as a director with Incomplete, Chisato Aihara for Shy in July 1997. He twice won an award from the Tokyo-based AV magazine Orange Communications (オレンジ通信) which ended its long publishing history in 2009.

=== SOD ===
Up to 1997 Tohjiro had been mainly working for the older major rental-video oriented studios but in that year he joined the recently formed independent or "indie" studio Soft On Demand (SOD) which sold its videos to the general market and had looser content standards. Beginning in December 1997, SOD released a series of Tohjiro branded videos on their Hamlet label beginning with Real Fetish labeled as TJ-001. This VHS tape, which was released as a DVD in 2002, has actress Sanae Asō in a variety of bondage and S&M fetish situations including having sex while covered in animal entrails.

Tohjiro also continued directing for other studios, including Yuri Komuro's first video for Alice Japan, Sexy Butt from January 1998 where she plays an alien from outer space who has sex with earthmen, and two entries in h.m.p.'s S&M genre Kitan Club label in April and June 1998.

He is credited with launching the career of AV Idol Kurumi Morishita at SOD, the actress most closely associated with his work for many years. He directed her first video Ubu released in September 1998.

In December 1999, Ganari Takahashi, the founder and chief at SOD, banned Tohjiro from making porn videos with SOD for a year, telling him to "go away and fix your porn-addicted brain! Your recent movies have lost their edge!" For that year, Tohjiro worked on softcore V-Cinema films for SOD including the May 2000 VHS production Lovely Woman Teacher (愛しの女教師) starring Mirei Asaoka and the October 2000 Nude Hostess (全裸若女将) with Kurumi Morishita. This was followed in December by nana (なな) starring Chinatsu Itō. All three VHS videos were later released by SOD in DVD format.

=== Dogma ===
After a year Tohjiro returned saying "I'm going to start a revolution at SOD!" In February 2001, he formed the Dogma label as part of the SOD group. His first release under the Dogma label appeared in April 2001, Innocent Desire, with his favorite actress Kurumi Morishita. A year later Tohjiro separated Dogma from SOD to form an independent company. When Dogma became a separate company, Morishita left SOD to join Dogma and Tohjiro as a contract actress.

Under Tohjiro, Dogma has been successful as a company specializing in extreme fetish videos which include bondage, forced fellatio and various S&M themes. In December 2005 Tohjiro and Morishita returned to make peace at their old studio SOD with Stripper, a lesbian love story with SOD star Nana Natsume.

In addition to Morishita, other AV Idols who have worked extensively at Dogma with Tohjiro are Mayura Hoshitsuki, Chihiro Hasegawa, Maki Tomoda and Marin Izumi. With a few other actresses, they make up the group known as Tohjiro's M (Masochist) Women. Tohjiro instituted a separate hardcore S&M themed label, CORE SM, in December 2005 with its first release being Maki Tomoda - Bound Masochistic Slave.

Beginning in 2005, Dogma sponsored the D-1 Climax (D-1 クライマックス) awards as a competition for directors inside and outside of the Dogma studio. Tohjiro won the 1st Place award in 2005 and 2006 but finished 9th in 2007, the last year of the contest.

Tohjiro entered one of his Dogma videos, Vomit Enema Ecstasy X in the 2009 AV Grand Prix competition and made some waves by declaring all-out war by his small "indie" company to defeat the favorite, top studio S1 No. 1 Style. S1 did take the GrandPrix prize and several others, but Tohjiro made good on part of his boast by winning the Digital Sales Award and the 2 million yen (about $20,000) prize money.

=== Death ===
Tohjiro died on July 17, 2026, at the age of 70. His cause of death was lung cancer.
