= Wanz (disambiguation) =

Wanz is American R&B, soul, hip hop and pop (real name (Michael Wansley).

Wanz may also refer to:

- WANZ, American radio station in Stamford, NY, USA
- Otto Wanz (1943–2017), Austrian former professional wrestler and boxer
- Wanz Factory, Japanese adult video production company

== See also ==
- Wanze, Walloon municipality of Belgium located in the province of Liège
