= Total Media Agency =

Japanese pornographic film company

- Industry: Pornography
- Founded: 1990
- Headquarters: Tokyo, Japan
- Products: Pornographic films, Sex toys

Total Media Agency (TMA) (トータル・メディア・エージェンシー, Tōtaru Media Ējenshii) is a Japanese adult video company located in Tokyo, Japan.

== Company information ==
TMA, founded in October 1990, has offices located within Tokyo's Toshima ward. The studio specializes in videos generally in the cosplay genre but they are especially noted for making porn-parodies based on famous manga and anime series such as The Melancholy of Haruhi Suzumiya, Lucky Star, Neon Genesis Evangelion, and K-On!. The company also designs and markets sex toys under the Tamatoys brand.

TMA has been one of the pioneer companies in exploring new media for adult videos. In 2005, they were one of the first studios, along with Glay'z and h.m.p., to produce adult material for the UMD format used on the PlayStation Portable with their August 12, 2005 release of three videos including Campaign Girl Collection Portable (キャンギャルCollection ポータブル), coded TPS-001. Two years later in 2007, when Sony's Blu-ray format was still in competition with the rival HD DVD format, with some technical assistance from Sony, TMA was one of the first Japanese AV companies to release videos in the Blu-ray format. In a July 2007 article, Yoshimasa Nozu, a producer at TMA said the company planned to release at least one Blu-ray disc per month for the rest of the year.

The studio produces about 16 new videos per month and in September 2011, the Hokuto Corporation's commercial website DMM listed over 1250 DVD titles available under the TMA company name.

=== AV Grand Prix ===
TMA was one of the companies which submitted videos for the 2008 AV Grand Prix competition. Their entry, Hermaphrodite White Lily Academy (ふたなり白百合女学院 ほしのみゆ), labeled AVGP-020, was a futanari genre work starring Miyu Hoshino, Ryo Kiyohara, Reina Mizuki and Nana Mizuki. TMA also entered the 2009 AV Grand Prix contest with a video, Miniskirt Creampie International Students (ミニスカブーツ生中出しインターナショナル), labeled AVGP-131, which featured non-Japanese actresses.

== Labels ==
In addition to TMA, the company has used the following labels for its videos:

- Expotion
- Mizuiro
- TMA Works

== Actresses ==
Some of the actresses who have appeared in TMA videos:

- Hotaru Akane
- Bunko Kanazawa
- Yua Kisaki
- Sakurako Kaoru
- Yuria Kato
- Marina Matsushima
- Momoka Nishina
- Anna Ohura
- Nao Oikawa
- Maria Ozawa
- Riko Tachibana
- Tsubomi

== Series ==
Video series produced by TMA include:

- Molester Bus (痴漢バス女子校生)
- Swimsuit Lovers (競泳水着 LOVERS)
