= KM Produce =

Japanese pornographic film company

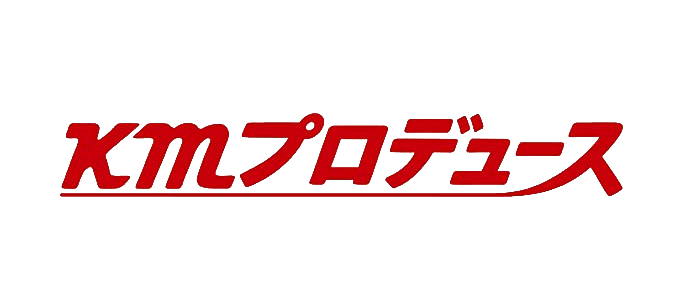
- Industry: Pornography
- Founded: 2002
- Headquarters: Shibuya, Tokyo, Japan
- Products: Pornographic films
- Number of employees: 33
- Website: km-produce.com

KM Produce or KMP (ケイ・エム・プロデュース, Kei・Emu・Purodyusu) is a Japanese adult video (AV) company located in Shibuya, Tokyo.

== Company information ==
KM Produce (KMP) became an independent AV production company under that name using the "Million" label for its videos in April 2002, in competition with other major AV companies such as Soft On Demand and Moodyz. The Million label had previously been used by the DMN (Digital Media Network) company whose website (www.dmn-web.com) had closed by November 2002. Videos from the DMN Million period are now sold at the KMP shop.

One of KMP's first stars was AV Idol Nao Oikawa who had released her first video under the Million label in May 2002. Other early actresses with the company were Ran Monbu, Saori Kamiya and Hitomi Hayasaka. Together with Oikawa, they formed the 2003 "Million Girls" (ミリオンガールズ, Miriongāruzu) and their videos were released under the KMP Million label. In subsequent years the "Million Girls" group consisted of Miyuki Uehara, Asuka Sawaguchi, Miyu Sugiura, nao, and Kyoko Nakajima in 2004, and Akane Sakura, Naho Ozawa and Karen Kisaragi in 2005.

In 2004, KMP started another exclusive group of actresses, the "Million Executive" (ミリオンエグゼクティブ, Mirioneguzekutibu), comprising Nao Oikawa and Hitomi Hayasaka. In 2005 they were joined by Ran Monbu. Another promotional event was the KMP in-house competition called the Million Academy Award Prize in 2004 which was won by The Woman Called Nao with Nao Oikawa and nao.

In late 2009, the company had 7 employees and an annual revenue of nearly $13 million. KMP was affiliated with the Media Station (Cosmos Plan) and Real Works studios and operated the Media Station website, home.uchu.co.jp and the Real Works website, www.realworks.tv in addition to its own website, www.km-produce.com, which had been in existence since April 4, 2002.

In 2011, a major re-alignment took place and from February 2011, videos previously produced under the Media Station and Real Works labels were incorporated into the KMP works listing, and by April 2011, the Media Station and Real Works websites announced that they had been integrated into the KMP website. The website of a third company, Super Shirouto, sq4610.com, also announced that it had been integrated into KMP.

By late 2011, KMP was producing about 35 videos per month. This included works under the old KMP labels of Million and Okazu as well as the old Real Works labels Real, Ecstasy and M, the old Media Station labels Cosmos (Uchu) and Bazooka, and the Super Shirouto label (S級素人). Two new labels were also added, SCOOP ((スクープ)) in July 2011, and Sleazy in August 2011. In September 2011, the main Japanese AV retailer, DMM (part of the Hokuto Corporation), listed a total of 1341 DVDs under the KMP name.

KM Produce, as constituted in 2011 with their business headquarters in Shibuya, Tokyo and a second location in Meguro, Tokyo, had 33 employees and a capital of 10 million yen (about $130,000), and was directed by Akio Kita (北 昭夫).

== Labels ==
At various times before 2011, KMP used the following labels for its videos:

- Million (ミリオン) (with product codes MILD and RMILD for sales and rental versions)
- Million Angel (ミリオンエンジェル)
- Million Madams (ミリオンマダムズ)
- Okazu (おかず) (with product codes OKAD and ROKAD for sales and rental versions)
- Umanami (うまなみ)

From 2011, the following labels were also used:

- Real
- Ecstasy
- M
- Cosmos Plan (Uchu)
- Bazooka
- SCOOP (スクープ)
- Sleazy
- Super Shirouto (S級素人)

== Directors ==
The following directors have worked for KMP:

- Hideto Aki
- Goro Tameike
- KINGDOM

== Actresses ==
A number of AV Idols have performed for the KMP studio:

- Airi & Meiri
- Hotaru Akane
- Yume Ayanami
- Hitomi Hayasaka
- Mariko Kawana
- Karen Kisaragi
- Meguru Kosaka
- Ran Monbu
- Kyoko Nakajima
- Nao Oikawa
- Asuka Sawaguchi
- Riko Tachibana
- Akira Watase

== Series ==
Some selected series produced by KMP:

- High School Girls After School (放課後の女子校生)
- Perfect Capture (完全攻略)

== Mainstream movies ==
KMP ventured into the field of mainstream movie production with the film Dark Love: Rape (ダーク・ラブ～Rape～, Dāku rabu: Rape) which was released in Japan on March 1, 2008. The movie, directed by Katsuya Matsumura, the horror director known for his film All Night Long, was based on the manga series Rape (レイプ, Reipu) by Shūichi Sakabe. The erotic psycho-thriller starred Dankan and Gravure idol Yuu Tejima as well as KMP AV star Hitomi Hayasaka. The film was also released by KMP as a DVD on July 18, 2008, under their Okazu label, coded KMPD-001.

== AV Open ==
KM Produce participated in both the 2006 and 2007 AV Open competitions under the Million label. Their entry for 2006 was Million Dream Angels (ミリオン・ドリーム ～私立ミリ商の天使たち～) (product code OPEN-0613) starring Yu Saotome, Azumi Harusaki, Hitomi Hayasaka, Miho Hashimoto, Karen Kisaragi, Mitsu Amai, Hime Kamiya, Ai Ueto and Megu Ayase.

The 2007 AV Open nominee was also an ensemble work, Million Dream 2007 Part 1 (ミリオン・ドリーム 2007前編 ～ミリ商、痴女-1グランプリに出場！～), product code OPEN-0714, starring Azumi Harusaki, Mei Itoya, Kotone Aizaki, Noa, Riko Tachibana, Riku Shiina, Yume Imano, Ryo Kiyohara, Miki Yamashiro, Hitomi Hasegawa and Rico.

== Sources ==
- "KMP official website" (in Japanese). Archived from the original on 2010-04-02.
