= Taka Kato =

Japanese pornographic film actor (born 1959)

- Born: Masayuki Kato; May 1, 1959 (age 67) (Note: Since his debut his year of birth was 1962 until he corrected it during his retirement in August 2013.); Akita, Japan
- Other names: Taka Katou, Katō Taka, Masayuki Kato, Taka Katô
- Height: 1.80 m (5 ft 11 in)
- Spouse: Sanae Asô (1998-2011)

Taka Kato (加藤鷹, Katō Taka) or Taka Katou is a Japanese male former adult video (AV) actor.

== Life and career ==
Taka Kato was born in Akita on May 1, 1959. He graduated from a high school in Akita and in 1988 went to Tokyo where he worked as a photographer and adult video actor. His official profile claims performances in 5000 to 5300 videos as of 2005. At the 8th Tokyo Sports Film Awards for work in 1997, he won the AV Leading Actor Award.

Kato is famous in the Japanese AV industry for his ability to induce "shiofuki" or female ejaculation. His prowess in this area has earned him the title "Goldfinger", It was reported in 2007 that Kato's AV workload had lessened because he had erectile dysfunction issues, but Kato called it "all just a vicious rumor", though admitting he may no longer have the prowess of a 20-year-old.

Kato made his debut as a director with Superstar Loves Lolita (スーパースターはロリが好き) starring Yuu Aine and released by AV studio Dogma on September 15, 2007. The video, in which Kato also acted, was part of the 3rd D-1 Climax contest for Dogma directors. Kato's entry finished 8th among the 14 competitors.

In 2008, Kato joined talents with legendary Dogma director and founder TOHJIRO for a 10th anniversary celebration of their Lessons in Secret Technique "shiofuki" video. In this new collaboration, 10 Year Special Lessons In Secret Technique Men’s Bible Vol. 1 (あれから10年 秘技伝授 男のバイブル[完全潮吹き入門] Vol.1), released June 19, 2008, Kato demonstrates his technique using a plastic transparent vagina. His Dogma pupils have only limited success imitating him with actresses Hotaru Akane, Ryo Akanishi, Marin Izumi, Yuu Tsuyuno and Mayura Hoshitsuki. Akanishi wins the special prize of having sex with Taka Kato. In a second video, 10 Year Special - Lessons In Secret Technique - Men’s Bible Vol. 2 (あれから10年 秘技伝授 男のバイブル Vol.2), released July 19, 2008, Kato continues the lesson using vibrators. The Dogma staff learn their lessons well and apply them to actresses Marin Izumi, Yuu Tsuyuno, Ryou Natsume, Mayura Hoshitsuki, and Akane Mochida.

Kato has also acted in several softcore V-Cinema films and has had appearances on TV and in videos as an expert in sexual techniques. He has published several books on the subject as well. He has even joined with a classical orchestra to whisper words of love on the 2006 CD Lovers Classic.

In February 2005, Kato used his porn expertise as one of a panel of 5 judges which gave out the first Adult Broadcasting Awards for adult shows on Japanese satellite TV broadcaster SKY PerfecTV!. Kato also presided as the host of an Internet variety TV program on GyaO called "Corner Kick" (コーナーキック). Sixteen of the 60 minute shows were produced in 2007. AV actress Hitomi Hasegawa was a regular on the program and guest stars included AV Idols Nao Oikawa and Kurumi Morishita as well as porn actor Ryuji Yamamoto.

Kato was one of the people interviewed for Misato Nakayama's January 2006 study of professionals in the adult industry, 性職者の人々 あの世界の仕事師たち (Sei Shoku Sha No Hitobito Ano Sekai No Shigotoshi Tachi), published by Ohzora (ISBN 4-7767-9229-X).

In May 2012, Kato Taka's Gold Finger!! App for iPhone has launched in App Store (iOS).

In November 2013 it was reported that Kato Taka had decided to retire from AV industry at the end of the year, as he was ready to move on with the next phase of his life.

== Sources ==
- Connell, Ryann (May 28, 2007). "Japan's biggest male porno star finds his career going flaccid". Mainichi Shimbun. Alt URL
- "Taka Katô". IMDb.
- "T加藤鷹 ゴールドフィンガー53 (Kato Taka - Goldfinger)" (in Japanese). YouTube.
- "Official Website" (in Japanese). www.katotaka.com.
- "Movies with Taka Katou". www.sazuma.com.
