= Alice Japan =

Japanese pornographic film studio

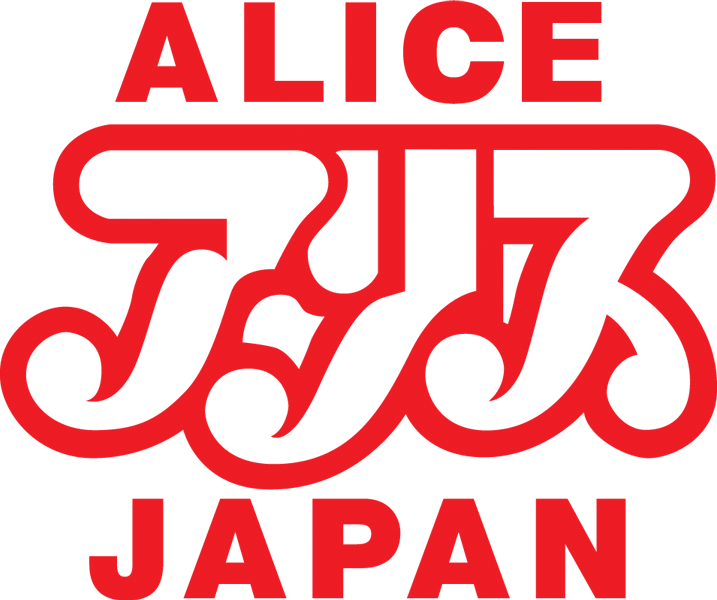
- Type: Subsidiary
- Industry: Pornography
- Founded: 1986
- Headquarters: Nakano, Tokyo, Japan
- Products: Pornographic films
- Parent: Japan Home Video
- Website: Alice Japan

Alice Japan (アリスJAPAN, Arisu JAPAN) is a home video division of Japan Home Video.

== Company information ==
The early AVs produced by JHV went under the Penguin (ぺんぎん) label, the first title being the 30-minute-long softcore Asobinasareya, Tadakurue (遊びなされや、ただ狂へ) starring Hidemi Nakajima (中島秀美) released May 21, 1984, with production code KA-1001. The same production code series was used for releases under the Alice Japan label which began with Sexy Violence (セクシーバイオレンス), KA-1050, starring Mariko Kajikawa. In the years following, the company continued using the "KA" series for their products released on VHS tape.

Iconic AV Idol Hitomi Kobayashi was one of the company's first stars appearing in Alice Japan videos as early as 1986. Among other early AV actresses who made their debut with Alice Japan were Riria Yoshikawa in 1990 and Asami Jō in 1995. Early directors for the company include Rokurō Mochizuki, who started in pink film, Kunihiro Hasegawa and Yuji Sakamoto, who were directing for Alice Japan in the late 1980s and early 1990s.

Alice Japan has had a long association dating back to at least 1997 with the Kuki Inc. group of AV companies which includes Kuki, Max-A, Atlas21, Big Morkal, Media Station (Cosmos Plan) and Sexia. Like several of the other companies in this group, Alice Japan works mostly with new actresses especially those making their debut in AV. All these companies use the Kuki-owned X CITY website to advertise and distribute streaming video versions of their products.

Like Kuki, h.m.p., Max-A and many of the older "pro" AV studios in Japan, Alice Japan has been a member of the ethics group Nihon Ethics of Video Association (NEVA) which regulates content and the censorship mosaic required in Japanese porn videos. Because of this, most of the videos produced by Alice Japan have used a large, blocky analog mosaic as opposed to the newer thinner digital mosaics now in common use among the "indie" studios such as the Soft On Demand (SOD) group. In 2007, the company began re-releasing several of its old videos using a new thinner mosaic standard under the "Alice Pink" label.

The Alice Japan Official Website contains a large searchable database of Alice Japan videos dating back to 1984 as well as a list of actresses and a section for Actress Blogs.

== Labels ==
In addition to the standard Alice Japan label, the following have also been used for adult videos:

- Directors (from 1989)
- Babylon (from 1994)
- Erotica (from 1995)
- ADNIS
- Alice Pink
- Charm

- Chocolat
- Jewel
- midi
- Mikle
- Mirukuru
- Pino

== Directors ==
AV directors who have worked frequently for Alice Japan include:

- Some Chan
- Kazutoshi Goto (後藤和俊)
- Minami Haou (南★波王)
- Kunihiro Hasegawa
- Takumi Iwasaki (岩崎たくみ)
- Shigeo Katsuyama (勝山茂雄)
- Kazuhito Kuramoto (倉本和比人)
- Rokurō Mochizuki
- Kei Morikawa
- Kyosuke Murayama (村山恭助)
- Tadanori Usami
- Pusuke Yamada (山田風゜助)

== Actresses ==
Some of the most famous AV Idols in Japanese porn have performed for Alice Japan including:

- Kyōko Aizome
- Hotaru Akane
- Riko Akina
- Minori Aoi
- Sora Aoi
- Tsukasa Aoi
- Yuma Asami
- Ami Ayukawa
- Mari Ayukawa
- Yumika Hayashi
- Ai Iijima
- Ayame Ikehata
- Asami Jō
- Bunko Kanazawa
- Mariko Kawana
- Kyōko Kazama
- Aino Kishi
- Hitomi Kobayashi
- Yuri Komuro
- Hitomi Kudo
- Hiromi Matsuura
- Mihiro
- Ryōko Mitake
- Aika Miura
- Alice Miyuki
- Rena Murakami
- Nana Nanaumi
- Mako Oda
- Anna Ohura
- Nao Oikawa
- Natsuki Ozawa
- Nao Saejima
- Rui Sakuragi
- Ai Sayama
- Kaho Shibuya
- Riko Tachibana
- Yui Tatsumi
- Maki Tomoda
- Aki Tomosaki
- Rico Yamaguchi
- Akiho Yoshizawa
- Makoto Yuki
- Maria Yumeno

== Series ==
A selected list of series from the Alice Japan label:

- Dangerous Looked-Up Room (危ない密室)
- Flash Paradise (フラッシュパラダイス)
- Flashback (フラッシュバック)
- Give Up Human Being AKA Inhumanity (人間廃業)
- Mejiri AKA Female Ass (女尻)
- Obscene Model (猥褻モデル)
- The Contrary Soap Heaven / Reverse Soap Heaven (逆ソープ天国)
