= Bunko Kanazawa =

Japanese pornographic actress (born 1979)

- 金沢文子
- Born: April 4, 1979 (age 47); Kanagawa Prefecture, Japan
- Other name: Fumiko Kanazawa
- Height: 1.56 m (5 ft 1 in)
- Website: www.graphix.ne.jp/kanabun/index.html

Bunko Kanazawa (Japanese: 金沢文子, Hepburn: Kanazawa Bunko) is a Japanese adult film actress, who was mostly active in the late 1990s and early 2000s. She has been called "one of the biggest AV idols in Japan".

== Life and career ==
=== Debut—Cosmos Plan ===
Bunko Kanazawa was born April 4, 1979, in Kanagawa prefecture. She reports that as a child she was good at mathematics and science, but horrible in Japanese and English language studies. Her hobbies as an adult include cooking, snowboarding, and karaoke.

Kanazawa was introduced to the AV industry by a friend. Her stage name, given to her by her agency, is taken from Kanazawa Bunko, a train station, museum, and historic library in Kanagawa Prefecture, where she lived at the start of her career. Her stage name is sometimes shortened to "Kanabun", a nickname that she dislikes. Kanazawa made her AV (adult video) debut with the Media Station Cosmos Plan label in the August 1997 release 18 Years Old. Kanazawa's second video, Tough Adolescence, was a science-fiction sex drama released by the same label in September 1997. Speaking of videos such as this one, which required a degree of acting, Kanazawa commented that she does not consider herself a good actress. She says that she especially has difficulty with a leading role and with ad libbing. Obscene Model (August 1999) was another video in which Kanazawa had to use her acting abilities. She played the role of a race queen who seduces her sponsor and her cameraman. This video also included a scene in which the actress visits a man's home—an amateur—and performs for him. Kanazawa was still with the Cosmos Plan label for her one-year anniversary video, Platinum Fuck (September 1998).

=== VCDs and DVDs ===
In addition to videos and DVDs, Kanazawa released several works for Cosmos Plan in the VCD format. She initiated a four-volume "Special Edition" VCD set in December 1997. All of these releases contained selections from Kanazawa's videos and images in the .BMP format. The first VCD SUPER BEST in this series had highlights of Kanazawa's debut and scenes from Tough Adolescence. Her second "Special Edition" VCD, Kanabun's Feel, released in May 1998, was a similar collection of scenes from three of Kanazawa's previous releases. The "Special Edition" series continued in September 1998 with the release of Kanabun Typhoon Going North, which had highlights from four of her videos. A fourth volume in the series was released one year later, in September 1999, due to popular demand. This one also featured highlights from four previously released videos, as well as behind-the-scenes images.

Kanazawa's first DVD release (in June 1998) was a reissue of her debut video. Much was made of the visual clarity of the still new medium in advertising the release. It was claimed that the picture was so clear, Kanazawa's pubic hair (the display of which was banned by Japanese censorship laws), could be seen. Kanazawa released her last video for Cosmos Plan, Curtain Call, in December 1998. In 2004, Kanazawa's career with the studio was the subject of a five-volume retrospective "Memorial" series from Cosmos Plan.

=== Fetish videos—Alice Japan & Max-A ===
Kanazawa also appeared in several fetish films focusing on particular subgenres of the AV industry. Her January 1999 entry in Alice Japan's popular Female Ass (女尻, Meijiri) series focuses on various manipulations of the actress's posterior, and includes scenes with panties and lotion. Inhumanity focused on sexual violence, with the actress beaten up, raped and forced to perform fellatio. Max-A's Erotic Opening series, which focuses on fellatio, featured Kanazawa in its March 1999 video. Fetish Virgin III had the camera fetishistically centering on individual parts of the actress's body. A self-titled DVD from September 1999 was a similar work for body-part fetishists. In September 1999, Max-A chose to star Bunko Kanazawa in the first video in the revival of its popular Confined Bodydolls. Entitled The Confined Bodydolls: Bunko Goes Wild the video had Kanazawa in bondage on stage.

In magazine shoots, Kanazawa has often appeared dressed as a schoolgirl. Her first video to make use of this common theme in Japanese erotica was Uniform Indecent Doctrine, which had been released by Cosmos Plan in October 1998. Her appearance in Atlas21's popular NEO Bloody Uniform Connection series—the 51st video in that series—again had Kanazawa in the uniform of a high school girl. In addition, this cosplay-themed video had Kanazawa wearing the costumes of a nurse, an elevator girl, and a policewoman in a miniskirt.

=== Other early videos ===
Legend Of An AV Idol (February 1999) was Kanazawa's first video for Atlas21. This release focused on Kanazawa's career and stories of how she reached the number one spot in the Japanese AV industry. For Alice Japan, Kanazawa made a two-volume Self-Portrait series. These videos had the actress photographing herself in private moments, and engaging in sex.

Though Kanazawa dislikes airplane travel, she enjoys filming in overseas locations such as Bali. Her July 1998 release, Misfire Erotica, was filmed in Hong Kong.

=== Moodyz and first retirement ===
In August 2001, Kanazawa appeared in Dream School 2, an installment in the popular Moodyz series. The video won the main prize, the Moodyz Award, at the 2001 Moodyz Awards held in December 2001. Kanazawa concentrated on stripping and stopped releasing new videos from the summer of 2002 but she returned to adult video with her April 2003 work for Moodyz, Super Zoom Up Erotic 2. She continued making videos with Moodyz and a number of other studios including a December 2004 gokkun title for Moodyz, Bunko Kanazawa Drink Sperm Too. After a January 2005 simulated rape video (Bunko Kanazawa Will be Violated) for Moodyz, Kanazawa announced her retirement from the AV industry.

=== Comeback and second retirement ===
It was reported in 2006 that Kanazawa would start making uncensored movies for a studio/website called Tora Tora Tora. These began to appear in September 2006 as pay-per-view videos on the 99bb.com website and then later on XVN.JP. Some of the material has been collected in two DVDs released in March 2007 and May 2008.

After almost three years away from the mainstream Japanese porn scene, Kanazawa made a comeback in December 2007 with a new video for Moodyz (Hyper-Digital Mosaic Vol.072) and one in January 2008 for DAS (Semen Urine Human Toilet). She continued her career through 2008 and early 2009 with a series of videos for Attackers with director Kenzo Nagira and the AV Grand Prix entry for the new studio Ran Maru titled Fuck Me and I Go Wild! Kanazawa Bunko. After this Kanazawa made sporadic AV appearances in 2009 and 2010 before quietly retiring from the industry again.

== Sources ==
- "Kanazawa Bunko: A nice chat with one of the biggest AV-idols in Japan". www.jmate.com.
- "Kanazawa Bunko Interview". Jmate.com.
- "Bunko Kanazawa". AV Idol Directory. Archived from the original on 2012-10-05.
- "金沢文子 (Kanazawa Bunko)" (in Japanese). JMDB.
- "金沢文子 – Kanazawa Bunko (Profile)". Web I-dic (in Japanese). Archived from the original on 2008-01-03.
- "金沢文子 (Kanazawa Bunko - Moodyz profile and filmography)" (in Japanese). Moodyz. Archived from the original on 2008-03-04.
- "金沢文子 (Kanazawa Bunko - DAS profile and filmography)" (in Japanese). www.dasdas.jp. Archived from the original on 2008-05-16.
