= Mia Nanasawa =

Japanese AV idol (born 1998)

- 七沢 みあ
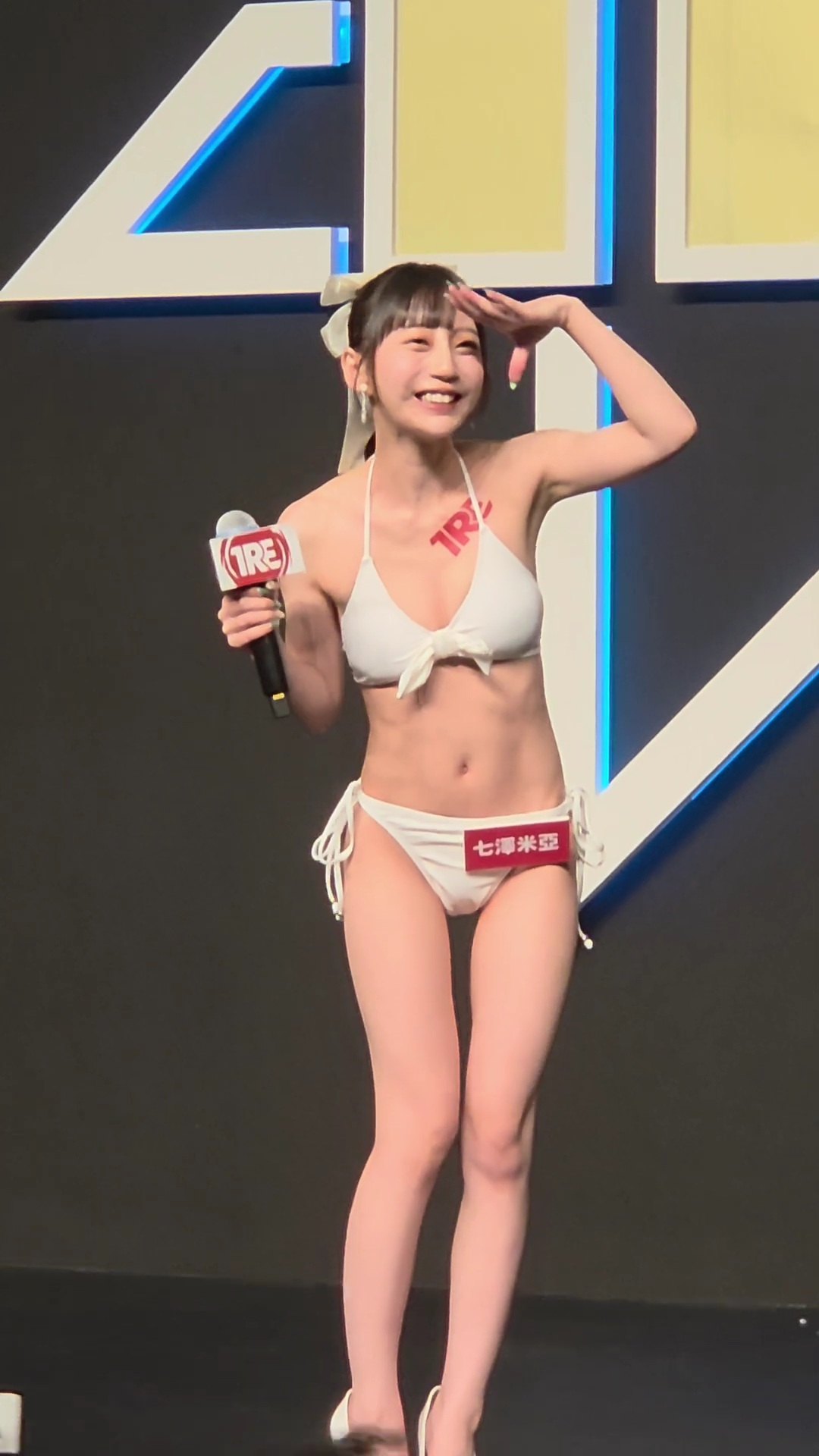
- Nanasawa at Taipei Red Expo in 2025
- Born: December 13, 1998 (age 27); Tokyo, Japan
- Occupations: Pornographic actress; AV idol; Cosplayer
- Years active: 2017–present
- Agent: Moodyz
- Height: 145 cm (4 ft 9 in)

Mia Nanasawa (Japanese: 七沢 みあ; born December 13, 1998) is a Japanese pornographic actress, AV idol, and cosplayer. She debuted with Moodyz in 2017.

== Background ==
Nanasawa was born in Tokyo, Japan. When she was in elementary school, she took dance lessons because she admired E-girls, a Japanese collective girl group. She later attended university, where she belonged to a food club.

== Career ==
Nanasawa made her debut on November 25, 2017, under Moodyz. In interviews, she has cited former Japanese adult film actress Aisu Kokoa as an actress she admired.

In 2024, HK01 reported on Nanasawa's cosplay-related appearances. KAI-YOU has also described her work as a cosplayer and performer.

== Awards and recognition ==
- She was nominated for the FANZA Adult Awards 2019 in the category of Best Actress.
- In July 2020, she ranked first in a FANZA popularity ranking of AV actresses.

== Personal life ==
Nanasawa has cited cosplay, eating out, cooking, video games, and shogi among her interests. She has also discussed her interest in anime and manga in interviews.
