= Mariko Kawana =

Japanese AV idol (born 1967)

- 川奈まり子
- Born: November 9, 1967 (age 57); Tokyo, Japan
- Height: 1.65 m (5 ft 5 in)

Mariko Kawana (Japanese: 川奈まり子, Hepburn: Kawana Mariko) (born November 9, 1967) began the most notable phase of her life as a Japanese model and actress who has appeared in softcore pink film and V-Cinema, and who has also been a hardcore adult video (AV) performer and director. She was one of the earliest AV actresses in the "mature woman" or "madame" (jukujo) category of performers. She is now retired as an actress and has returned to her pre-acting career as a writer.

== Life and career ==
Mariko Kawana was born on November 9, 1967 (although some sources give her birth date as August 23, 1967). After graduating college, she worked as a freelance writer and in a publisher's design department.

=== AV debut ===
In September 1999 at the age of thirty-one, Kawana entered the adult video (AV) industry with her release, 34 Year Old Mother Mariko from Soft On Demand (SOD), one of the largest porn conglomerates in Japan. Her age made her one of the earliest AV actresses in the "mature woman" or "madame" (熟女 or jukujo) category of performers, whose popularity in Japanese porn began in the mid-1990s. She appeared in two early videos for Kuki Inc., one in the bukkake genre (Mrs. Shower No. 1) and the other (Lesbian Heaven Finger Love Vol.11), which was part of a lesbian series. In the softcore field, she starred in the pink film Joi Kawana Mariko: Jukujo Tabū Sex (女医川奈まり子 熟女・タブーＳＥＸ) with Yōko Satomi which was released to theatres in March 2001.

Kawana appeared in the May 2001 issue of the magazine Penthouse Japan and in December 2001, she received the Best Mature Actress award at the 2001 X City Grand Prix Awards. The year 2002 opened with her starring in a pink film for woman director Sachi Hamano, Kawana Mariko: Mesuneko Gibo (川奈まり子 牝猫義母) and included an S&M role in the kunoichi (female ninja) video Kunoichi Is Captured for the Million label. Kawana had the starring role in the pink film Kawana Mariko Sakuragai No Amai Mizu (川奈まり子 桜貝の甘い水) released by OP Eiga in March 2002, which was a posthumous release of pink film pioneer director Satoru Kobayashi who had died in November 2001.

In November 2002, she was one of three actresses in the DVD "Love simulation game" LOVE TYPE from VIP studio. Kawana had previously been in an installment of the Wanz Factory series Performance and Direction where she starred and directed, and in January 2003, she again took up directorial duties in AV Made by Women which featured actor Taka Kato. In April 2003, she played the role of the dominant woman in the Attackers S&M video Confinement Insult and in September of that year, she appeared in the Kyōko Aizome-directed Lesbian Politicians.

=== Retirement and later career ===
In August 2003, Kawana married AV director Goro Tameike, who had directed her in her debut AV and other works, and retired from the adult video industry. She says that her developing relationship with Tameike since her AV debut changed her and that he was her first true love. Her retirement video, Mariko Last Love, directed by Tameike, was released by Moodyz in March 2004. Soon after her retirement, Kawana was the MC at the 20th anniversary celebration of the Japanese magazine Video Boy. Among the guests were AV stars Akiho Yoshizawa & Sora Aoi.

Kawana gave birth to a boy in November 2004 and posed for a "very tasteful photobook", Sex Evolution - Mariko Kawana, during her pregnancy. Since then, in addition to parenting, she has been active as columnist and novelist. She also accompanied her husband (who had directed for the SOD conglomerate for 10 years) to the 4th Annual SOD Awards in December 2005. In a different area, Kawana's portrait was on the cover of rice packages produced by National Farm, a company started by Ganari Takahashi, the founder of SOD who subsequently went into the agriculture business.

Kawana and her husband Tameike were both interviewed for Misato Nakayama's study of professionals in the adult industry, Sei Shoku Sha No Hitobito Ano Sekai No Shigotoshi Tachi (性職者の人々 あの世界の仕事師たち), published January 2006 by Ohzora (ISBN 4-7767-9229-X).

According to a November 2010 article by Japanese tabloid Weekly Asahi Geinō, despite her retirement, Kawana had become known in a new venue. The article details the popularity and spread of Japanese adult videos in North Korea and, according to one source, Kawana's videos were "especially popular" in that country. When reached for comment, Kawana's response on Twitter was, “Really?!” (マジすか?!^{?}, Maji [de]su ka?!).

Kawana's first novel, Gibo no enkou (義母の艶香) (ISBN 978-4-575-51469-8) was released in November 2011 by Futabasha.

In 2016, Kawana started an organization calling on the Japanese porn industry for standardized and transparent contracts with actresses.
