= Media Station (Japanese company) =

Japanese adult video production company

- Industry: Pornography
- Predecessor: Cosmos Plan
- Founded: 1981
- Headquarters: Tokyo, Japan
- Products: Pornographic films

Media Station (メディアステーション, Media Suteeshon), founded as Cosmos Plan (宇宙企画, Uchū Kikaku), was a Japanese adult video (AV) production company. In early 2011, they were integrated with the AV company KM Produce.

== Company information ==
The company was founded under the name Cosmos Plan on October 13, 1981 making it, along with h.m.p (then known as Samm) and Tadashi Yoyogi's Athena Eizou, one of Japan's pioneering AV companies. The studio's first video, Lesbian College Dorm Bathroom (女子大生ルポ・風呂場のレズ), starring Emi Nakamura, was released in December 1981. The video, directed by pink film director Genji Nakamura, who later made an early gay pink film Beautiful Mystery, was one of earliest of the modern style adult videos. Soon afterward the studio also released one of the first S&M adult videos, Tanaka Tizuko First Time SM (田中千鶴子のSM初体験). In 1982, Michiko Shyness Notes (美智子の恥じらいノート) starring Michiko Miura broke new ground in AV with its documentary style, including an interview with the shy actress, a format still being used for debut videos of featured actresses. The studio's success was assured with a series of popular "beautiful girl" (美少女, bishoujo) videos in the following years. Among the early stars of the studio was Keiko Nakazawa who made her AV debut for Cosmos Plan in December 1985 with the video Confusion (とまどい, Tomadoi). The studio added a new label, Bazooka, in August 1989.

In 1990, as its business expanded into other areas, the company changed its name to Media Station but continued to produce videos under the Cosmos Plan label. In the later 1990s a number of future AV Idols made their debuts with the company, including Madoka Ozawa in 1996, Bunko Kanazawa and Sally Yoshino in 1997, and Minori Aoi in 1999. Kanazawa would go on to make more videos with the company than any other actress.

By at least 1997, Cosmos Plan and a number of the other older AV companies including Alice Japan, Atlas21, Max-A and Big Morkal had gathered around Kuki Inc. to pool resources and use the X CITY website for sales and video on-demand, together forming the largest porn conglomerate in Japan at that time. In late 2007, the company, with headquarters in Shibuya, Tokyo, had capital of 20 million yen (about $200,000) and reported sales for the fiscal year 2005 of 1.5 billion yen (about $15 million). In earlier years sales figures had totalled 1.6 billion yen for fiscal year 2000 and 1.9 billion yen for 2002 and 2003.

Media Station was affiliated with AV manufacturers KMP and Real Works, and the Media Station website, home.uchu.co.jp, was operated by KMP. In mid-2010 Media Station was releasing about 10 videos per month under its labels Cosmos Plan (with codes beginning with MDS) and Bazooka (with codes beginning MDB).

However, by April 2011, the Media Station website announced that Cosmos Plan had been integrated into the KMP website and from February 2011, the Cosmos and Bazooka labels were incorporated into KMP.

== Labels ==
In addition to the Cosmos Plan label, the company has also issued videos under the following label names:

- Bazooka
- Bijin
- Exert
- Pix
- Raiden
- Stylish

== Actresses ==
A number of prominent AV Idols have performed in Media Station videos:

- Hotaru Akane
- Minori Aoi
- Ami Ayukawa
- Hitomi Hayasaka
- Yumika Hayashi
- Honoka
- Bunko Kanazawa
- Yuri Komuro
- Meguru Kosaka
- Aika Miura
- Nozomi Momoi
- Alice Ogura
- Nao Oikawa
- Asami Sugiura
- Riko Tachibana
- Akira Watase
- Sally Yoshino

== Series ==
Media Station series include:

- Angel
- Fallen Angel X (堕天使X)
- Love Letter (ラブレター)
- Nurse Club (ナース倶楽部)
- Obscene MAX (猥褻MAX)
- Princess Butt (尻姫)
- The Goddess of Soapland (ソープの女神さま)
- Venus Style
- Wet Diary (おしめり手帖)

== Awards ==
Media Station was one of the companies associated with Kuki and the X City website which participated in the X City Adult Video Grand Prix Awards. At the 2001 X City Grand Prix Awards, the studio took the Best Video Title Award for Small Girls' Fuck (starring Sayaka Tsutsumi) on their Bazooka label. At the 2002 awards, the Bazooka label again won the Best Video Title Award for their popular Fallen Angel X series.

In 2004 the company took another award, the Best AV Title, at the 5th Takeshi Kitano Awards in 2004 for their video Faithful Pooch Saseko.

== Sources ==
- "Official Website". Archived from the original on May 7, 2010.
