= Kuki Inc. =

Japanese adult video company

- Industry: Pornography
- Founded: 1977
- Founder: Nakagawa Noriaki
- Defunct: February 22, 2017
- Fate: Dissolved
- Headquarters: Ebisuminami, Shibuya, Tokyo, Japan
- Products: Pornographic films
- Number of employees: c. 100
- Website: kuki.jp

Kuki Inc. (株式会社九鬼, Kabushiki gaisha Kuki) was a Japanese adult video (AV) company that was headquartered in Ebisu Minami in the Shibuya ward of Tokyo. The company was involved in the production and distribution of videos, satellite and cable TV, and a large internet site, X CITY.

The company dissolved on February 22, 2017.

== Company history ==
The corporation was founded by Noriaki Nakagawa (中川徳章) in 1977, making it one of the oldest adult products firms in Japan. The company was originally involved in producing adult magazines but with the growth of the adult video industry, Kuki released its first Keshi Wasure Bideo (消し忘れビデオ), in 1983. Among their early stars was Sakura Sena, who made her debut with Kuki in 1994 under the name Shiho Fujiwara.

In the spring of 1995 Kuki started a website, www.kuki.co.jp, which eventually became X CITY. Some six months later, the web services division became a separate company, Alchemia Inc. (株式会社アルケミア). An English sister site was launched in 1997 and a Korean site in 1998. The company built its reputation on softer aspects of Japanese porn, and with the exception of an occasional bondage or rape-themed video, most of their output consisted of new actresses in their first videos.

By at least 1997, a number of the other older AV companies had gathered around Kuki to pool resources and use the X CITY website for sales and video on-demand: Alice Japan, Atlas21, Max-A, Big Morkal, Media Station (Cosmos Plan) and (later) Sexia. Together, they formed the largest porn conglomerate in Japan at that time although they have been surpassed since by Soft On Demand (SOD) and the Hokuto Corporation.

In 2004 the entire Kuki group had more than 100 employees, about 20 of them at web-hoster Alchemia.

Like many of the older and larger AV companies in Japan, Kuki has been a member of the ethics group Nihon Ethics of Video Association (NEVA) which regulates content and the censorship mosaic required in Japanese porn videos. This resulted in many of the older videos produced by Kuki having a large, blocky analog mosaic as opposed to the newer thinner digital mosaics now in common use. From late 2007, Kuki has been re-issuing many of its older videos in the new mosaic as the Kuki Pink (KUKIピンクファイル) series.

=== "John See" ===
The "John See" series was a collaboration between Kuki founder Noriaki Nakagawa and performance artist John Duncan who resided in Japan from 1982 to 1986. Nakagawa offered to produce a series of commercial adult videos through Kuki which were written, directed and edited by Duncan under the name John See. Duncan looked on the experience as an experiment and an attempt to stretch the stereotypical boundaries of adult film. For Kuki, which may not have recouped their investment in the videos, it was good publicity. Reviews were mixed, those viewing them as art were positive but those looking at them strictly as hardcore porn were quite negative.

=== Labels ===
In addition to the Kuki and Kuki Pink labels, the company has also released videos under several other labels:

- Tank
- Vinl
- Toriko
- Grand Prix
- Bouken Gorilla
- GirlG

== X CITY ==
The X CITY website advertises itself as the "Biggest Adult Site in Japan!". The site charges a monthly flat fee for access to its services which include photographs, video clips and a streaming movie library from several AV companies. The website is run by a separate Kuki-owned corporation, Alchemia Inc. (株式会社アルケミア).

The site was originally launched as www.kuki.co.jp in 1995 under Chief Operating Officer Tadasu Isogawa (五十川 匡). The commercial site Kuki Tower opened later that same year and a paysite was operative by the end of 1995. In 1996 the site was renamed as "THE CITY" and later as "X CITY". Streaming on-demand AV became available at the site in October 1997 and by 2001, broadband support was developed. An English version of the site was in operation by 1997, a Korean version followed in 1998 and a Chinese one in 2002.

From 1998 to 2004, X CITY sponsored an award competition based on fan votes, the X CITY Grand Prix Awards which awarded various prizes to actresses and videos in companies associated with the Kuki group. The site also contains an extensive searchable database of AV Idols and their videos with data on release dates, co-stars, directors and production codes in English.

A number of companies associated with Kuki are represented at the X CITY site. AV producers include:

- Kuki
- Alice Japan
- Atlas21
- Big Morkal
- Bouken Gorilla
- Cosmos Plan
- Max-A
- Off Side
- SexiA
- VIP

Other companies include adult magazine publishers, anime producer Fiveways, Shin-Toho which makes pink films, ENGEL, a non-porn movie producer, and the SKY PerfecTV! satellite TV channel Cherry Bomb.

== AV Grand Prix ==
Kuki was a participant in the AV Grand Prix contest in 2008 with the entry Grand prix Nana Konishi (AVGP-10) starring Nana Konishi. The company also competed in the 2009 AV Grand Prix with First Flowering Hatsuhana (AVGP-112) starring Junko Hayama and directed by Johnny Shibuya.
