= Dogma (studio) =

Japanese pornographic film company

- Type: Subsidiary
- Industry: Pornography
- Founded: 2001
- Founder: Tohjiro
- Headquarters: Roppongi, Tokyo, Japan
- Products: Pornographic films
- Parent: Hokuto Corporation
- Website: www.dogma.co.jp

Dogma (ドグマ ) is a Japanese adult video company based in Tokyo which specializes in various fetish genres of pornography.

== Company information ==
The Dogma label was formed as part of the Soft On Demand (SOD) group in February 2001 by Tohjiro, a director at SOD. A year later, Tohjiro separated Dogma from SOD to become a separate "indie" producer of AV material. Tohjiro said he liked the sound of the word "Dogma" and decided to use it for his label. The studio produces about 8 new titles a month, about half of them directed by Tohjiro. The company's products are distributed as downloadable videos through their website and as DVDs through the Hokuto Corporation. In addition to video production, Dogma has also made a small foray into the T-Shirt business with some designs by AV Idol Kurumi Morishita.

Dogma is incorporated as OM Production, Inc. (株式会社オムプロダクション) with Muneyuki Mikami (三上宗之) as chairman and chief executive officer. The company has its offices and studios in Tokyo's shinjyuku district.

=== Series and labels ===
Dogma specializes in extreme videos depicting various fetish genres including anal sex, bondage, S&M, forced fellatio and vomiting, enemas, watersports and scat. One of Dogma's longest running series is "Confinement Chair Trance" (拘束椅子トランス), directed by Tohjiro, which started up in November 2002. Another Tohjiro series is the S&M "M-Drug" (Mドラッグ) series which began in September 2005 with Mayura Hoshitsuki. Tohjiro is also the director of the "Innocent Desire" (青い性欲) lolita-genre series which premiered in March 2001 when Dogma was still part of SOD. Another extensive series is the "Hermaphrodite" (ふたなり) set of videos directed by Hitoshi Nimura.

Most Dogma videos have been released under the Dogma label but Tohjiro instituted a separate hardcore S&M themed label, CORE SM, in December 2005 with its first release being Maki Tomoda - Bound Masochistic Slave. Another label, Shyness, was started in November 2007 to continue the "Innocent Desire" lolita-genre series and a third label, Dogma Out, was used in 2005 and 2006 mostly by director Baba the Babee. The CORE label uses the production code series COT-xxx, Shyness uses DDH-xxx, and Dogma Out uses ODD-xxx.

== Actresses ==
Two actresses have been under contract to Dogma although both retired in recent years, Morishita in 2009 and Hoshitsuki in 2010.

Other actresses who have performed in Dogma videos include:

- Hotaru Akane
- Nao Ayukawa
- Ai Himeno
- Hikari Hino
- Marin Izumi
- Kyōko Kazama
- Yumi Kazama
- Saya Misaki
- Reiko Kobayakawa
- Akane Mochida
- Nozomi Momoi
- Ami Nishimura
- Noa
- Maria Ozawa
- Riko Tachibana
- Maki Tomoda
- Tsubomi
- Aoi Yuuki

== Directors ==
Listed below are the directors active at Dogma at the beginning of 2009 and also the first part of the production codes series used to identify their original videos for the Dogma label:

- TOHJIRO (DDT)
- Hitoshi Nimura (DDN)
- TENUN (DDU)
- Be-Bop Minoru (DDB)
- Normal Kim (DDK)
- Naniwa Ranko (DRD)
- Samurai Van (DDV)

Past directors at Dogma include:

- Baba the Babee (DDB)
- K*WEST (DWD)
- KINGDOM (DKD)
- Kyuuta Kutsume (DDQ)
- Kazuhiko Matsumoto (DDM)
- Company Matsuo (for the Out label)
- Goro Tameike (DDG)

== D-1 Climax Awards ==
Dogma sponsored the D-1 Climax (D-1 クライマックス) awards, which ran from 2005 to 2007, as a competition for directors. Several prominent directors from Dogma and other companies were invited to make videos under the Dogma label and sales during a set period plus voting by judges were used to determine the winners of the contest. Director and founder Tohjiro won the award in 2005 and 2006 but Hitoshi Nimura took the prize in 2007.

== AV GrandPrix ==
Dogma had not participated in the AV Open contests in 2006 and 2007 but with the ending of the D-1 Climax Awards, Dogma did enter a video in the Maniac Stage of the 2008 AV GrandPrix, a compilation from Tohjiro's M-Drug series Best of M Drug - Female Meat Toilet (Mドラッグ・スペシャル 女体肉便器ベスト) [AVGL-019]. For the 2009 AV GrandPrix competition, the Dogma entry was another Tohjiro production, Vomit Enema Ecstasy X (ゲロ浣腸エクスタシー X) [AVGL-130] starring Mayura Hoshitsuki and Yuka Osawa. Tohjiro made some waves by declaring all-out war by the small "indie" producer Dogma to defeat last year's champion, top studio S1 No. 1 Style. Although S1 did take the GrandPrix top prize and several others, Tohjiro made good on part of his boast - the Dogma video won the Digital Sales Award and the 2 million yen (about $20,000) prize money.
