= Moodyz =

Japanese adult video producer

- Industry: Pornography
- Founded: 2000
- Headquarters: Japan
- Products: Pornographic films
- Parent: Hokuto Corporation
- Website: www.moodyz.com

Moodyz (ムーディーズ, Mūdīzu), also known as Mr. President, is one of Japan's largest adult video (AV) producers, featuring an extensive catalog of video titles.

== Company information ==
The Moodyz website, www.moodyz.com, went online in March 2000 and the company released its first videos in September 2000 starting with Costume Princess starring Maiko Yuki. One of the studios earliest stars was AV Idol Bunko Kanazawa who appeared in her own installment of the Costume Princess series in December 2000. In October 2002, the company's fortunes were boosted by signing An Nanba to an exclusive contract for Moodyz beginning with her debut video Number.1!

To mark their fifth anniversary in September 2005, the studio released the fantasy costume drama, A Queendom of Eros, directed by KINGDOM and starring Chihiro Hara, Azusa Ayano, Jun Seto, Miki Komori, Shuri Himesaki and Yuna Takizawa. The work's elaborate sets and props made it one of the most expensive adult videos produced.

Moodyz is part of the large AV conglomerate Hokuto Corporation, which distributes Moodyz produced videos through retail sales and via mail order and digital download from its portal DMM.com. The Moodyz company manager and representative is Hitomi Niwa (丹羽ひとみ).

The company produces about 30-35 new releases and compilation videos per month and in September 2011 the DMM website listed more than 4000 DVD titles and over 1200 VHS tapes available under the Moodyz name.

== Moodyz labels ==
Moodyz produces various genres of videos under different labels. These range from softer glamour works to more hardcore scenes featuring bukkake, gokkun, anal sex, simulated rape, and interracial videos with black actors. Listed below are the labels used by Moodyz over the years.

- ACID
- ALL
- Art Mode (アートモード) - amateur nanpa themes
- ASS
- BEST - compilations
- BOMB
- Collection
- DIVA
- EDGE
- ES - FemDom fetish
- Fresh - new actresses
- Gati - features bukkake, gokkun, anal sex
- Goro Tameike (溜池ゴロー) - mature women
- GREAT
- Honey
- IMAGE
- Imperial
- ISM
- Joker
- Killer
- Legend - popular AV Idols
- Lover Soul (ラバーソウル)
- MODERATO - featured actresses
- NEW - actress debuts
- OH - bukkake, interracial
- President
- QUEST
- REAL - popular actresses
- REPLAY - compilations at low prices
- TOKKAR
- VALUE - bargain videos
- WILD - hardcore, anal, urination & rape scenes

== Directors ==
Directors who have worked extensively for Moodyz include:

- [Jo]Style
- Hideto Aki
- FLAGMAN
- Katsuyuki Hasegawa
- Hiroa
- KINGDOM
- Alala Kurosawa
- Kazuhiko Matsumoto
- Kenzo Nagira
- Fubuki Sakura
- Taikei Shimizu
- Goro Tameike
- Tadanori Usami
- Bunchou Yoshino

== Actresses ==
Since its inception a number of prominent AV Idols have performed in Moodyz videos, including the following actresses:

- Mia Nanasawa
- Yua Aida
- Hotaru Akane
- Rin Aoki
- Minami Aoyama
- Yui Haruka
- Hikari Hino
- Rinako Hirasawa
- Bunko Kanazawa
- Mariko Kawana
- Hikari Kisugi
- Kirari Koizumi
- Mayu Koizumi
- Marina Kyono
- Nei Nanami
- Saya Misaki
- Momoka
- Ran Monbu
- Kyoko Nakajima
- An Nanba
- JULIA
- Momoka Nishina
- Nao Oikawa
- Maria Ozawa
- Nao Saejima
- Sayuki
- Izumi Seika
- Manami Suzuki
- Hitomi Tanaka
- Maki Tomoda
- Aki Tomosaki
- Tsubomi
- Akira Watase
- Sally Yoshino
- Makoto Yuki
- Anri Okita
- Shiori Kamisaki

== Bonenkai and Moodyz Awards ==
Beginning in December 2001, Moodyz has held an annual year-end bonenkai (忘年会) party for its actresses and staff. This gala event with participants in full evening dress started out modestly with 217 participants at the "Nepushisu" Restaurant in Tokyo on December 27, 2001. The 2002 party had 400 guests and by 2003 the number had risen to 700 and then to over 1000 for the 2005 event. Guests included actresses and staff, managers, friends, and the press. The party was also the venue for the annual Moodyz Awards celebrating the work of Moodyz actresses and directors.

== Video series ==
=== Dream School series ===
The Dream School (ドリーム学園) or Dream Gakuen series is one of Moodyz oldest, best selling and most honored set of videos. The first volume was released in July 2001 when Moodyz had been in existence only a little over a year. Dream School 2 and Dream School 5 were the 2001 and 2002 winners of the Grand Prize Moodyz Award at the annual Moodyz Awards while Dream School 7 won the 2003 award for most sales. In 2006 Dream School 10 was the Moodyz entry in the AV Open contest where it took the 2nd Place Award. Again in 2007, Moodyz nominated another entry in the series, Dream School 11, for the AV Open where it won the 3rd Place Award. The series has continued with Dream School 12, released in June 2008.

The Dream School videos, all directed by Taikei Shimizu, have usually been major productions running 3 or 4 hours and having a large cast of actors and actresses. They are plotted as dramas taking place in a high-school setting and include a medley of porn genres including bukkake, gokkun, S&M, simulated rape, urolagnia, anal sex, orgies and even occasionally scat and bestiality. Several AV stars have appeared in the series including Bunko Kanazawa, Izumi Seika, Nao Oikawa, Chihiro Hasegawa, Mayura Hoshitsuki, Kokoro Amano, Akira Watase, Hotaru Akane and Chihiro Hara.

=== Other series ===
This is a selected listing of the more than 200 thematic video series which have been produced under various Moodyz labels.

- Amateur Doll (素人生ドル)
- Black Men and Sex (黒人とセックス) - interracial
- Black Semen in L.A. (ブラックザーメン in L.A.) - interracial
- Bukkake Nakadashi Anal Fuck (ぶっかけ中出しアナルFuck)
- Digital Mosaic (デジタルモザイク) - mosaic censoring applied by computer instead of analog methods
- Costume Play 7 (コスプレ7) - cosplay
- Disposable Masochist Slave (使い捨てM奴隷)
- Dream Idol (ドリームアイドル)
- Dream Woman (ドリームウーマン) - bukkake
- For the Best Onaniae (最高のオナニーのために)
- Genuine Nakadashi (真性中出し)
- Gokkun Club (ごっくんくらぶ) or "Gokkun kurabu" - gokkun
- Gokkun Land (ゴックンランド) - gokkun
- Hyper-Digital Mosaic (ハイパーデジタルモザイク)
- Lewd Women Swallowing Sperm (痴女と精子) or "Chijo onna to seishi"
- Paipan Hyper Digital Mosaic (パイパンハイパーデジタルモザイク)
- Polygamy Dream
- Sell Debut (初セル)
- Sex on the Beach
- Sperm Viking (男汁バイキング)
- Torture Club (拷問くらぶ)
- Women Who Want to See the Penis (チンポを見たがる女たち)

== Sources ==
- "Disabled dynamo shows sex no handicap". Mainichi Shimbun. December 4, 2002.
- "Horny youngsters can't see the pubes for the pus". Mainichi Shimbun. November 12, 2003.
