= AV Open =

Japanese adult video awards

AV Open is a major awards contest for the Japanese adult video industry. It went from a limited sales contest in 2006 to become, via its successor the AV GrandPrix, the major Japanese AV award with nearly 100 participating companies competing for the 2009 awards. The AV GrandPrix awards were not extended beyond 2009 but after a hiatus of seven years, the AV Open award competition was resurrected in 2014. The 2014 AV Open contest ran from 2014 until 2018, when it was once again not extended. No explanation was given for this decision.

== AV Open Origins ==
The AV Open awards for Japanese adult video (AV) companies were conceived as a means to improve public relations and provide a measure of quality for adult videos on a par with the AVN Awards for the US porn industry. It was the result of a collaboration between Tokyo Sports, a leading Japanese tabloid paper, and the large Japanese porn conglomerate Soft On Demand (SOD). Adult video production companies were invited to enter a candidate video in the contest and the video with the most number of sales during a set period would be the winner. The first prize award was 10 million yen (about $100,000), the second-place finisher took 5 million yen (about $50,000) and third place was worth 3 million yen (about $30,000). Videos in the contest were specially marked as AV Open entries and could be bought from the official site or at stores throughout Japan. Each contestant was to be given the same amount of space in the store displays.

A second part of the contest, the Challenge Stage, was for the purpose of developing new directorial talent. Multiple videos could be submitted by the companies, but only one per director. Winners were also to be determined by number of sales with a prize of one million yen (about $10,000) for first place, 500,000 yen (about $5,000) for second and 300,000 yen (about $3,000) for placing third. Special awards of 1 million yen each were also to be given for a total prize pool of 25 million yen (about $250,000).

== 2006 AV Open ==
The first AV Open contest was held in 2006 and 16 adult video companies participated in the main contest (IEnergy, Audaz, Aroma Planning, SOD, S1 No. 1 Style, Masaaki Kai, Glay'z, Deep's, Dream Ticket, Natural High, Hibino, Prestige, KMP Million, Moodyz, Real Works and Waap Entertainment). The Challenge Stage drew ten entries from six companies, including V&R Products and HMJM which did not compete for the main award. The entries for the main contest were labeled as OPEN-0601 through OPEN-0616 and the Challenge Stage entries were numbered OPEN-0651 through OPEN-0660. The contest dates were May 1 through June 30 and 627 video stores were involved in the contest. In addition to the main awards and the Challenge Stage awards, special awards were also to be given by celebrity judges, including New York Yankees player Hideki Matsui (who suffered a wrist injury playing baseball and had to withdraw from the contest), comedian Hitoshi Matsumoto, and author Lily Franky.

Results were announced at the awards ceremony held July 11, 2006 with several AV idols, directors, and company heads in attendance.

Winners - 2006 AV Open

- 1st Place: S1 - Hyper – Barely There Mosaic (ハイパーギリギリモザイク) - Compilation video featuring Sora Aoi, Yua Aida, Maria Ozawa, Yuma Asami, Honoka and Rin Aoki
- 3rd Place: Natural High - Student Molester (痴漢○学生) - Various actresses

Honorary President Lily Franky also awarded special prizes to Real Works for Special Galactic All-Stars (責め痴女 ハーレムSPECIAL) with Karen Kisaragi, Riko Tachibana, Hotaru Akane, Noa & Nashigo Tanaka and to SOD for 500 Person Sex (人類史上初！！超ヤリまくり！イキまくり！500人SEX！！).

Winners - 2006 AV Open Challenge Stage

- 1st Place: SAKKUN (Natural High) for Naked Continent (裸の大陸)
- 2nd Place: Hiroshi Horiuchi (HMJM) for Young Girl Insertion (少女は挿入される生き物)

As Honorary President, Lily Franky also gave another award to Naked Continent.

== 2007 AV Open ==
Since the 2006 AV Open proved popular and successful a second contest was held in 2007. For the second AV Open competition, 19 video producers submitted entries (IEnergy, Audaz, Aroma Planning, SOD, S1, Crystal-Eizou, Glay'z, Deep's, Natural High, Hibino, V&R Products, Prestige, Maxing, KMP Million, Moodyz, Real Works, Waap Entertainment, Wanz Factory, Kunitachi Farm). Videos were specially labeled "AV Open" and bore numbers OPEN-0701 through OPEN-0719. There were 12 entries in the Challenge Stage including entries from Akebono, Woman, Cross, Dandy & Dream Ticket which did not enter the main contest. Challenge Stage videos were labeled as OPEN-0751 to OPEN-0762. The contest was run from May 3 to June 30, 2007, and this time, more than 1200 stores throughout Japan participated in the contest.

When results were announced the SOD entry Performer Kotono's First Sexual Experience (芸能人 琴乃 初・体・験 完全240分 10解禁スペシャル) was the winner by a large margin. But rumors began to spread on the Internet and about a month later it was revealed that SOD had actually purchased a large number of the videos with company funds. The company had spent close to 60 million yen (About $600,000) to buy some 16,000 copies out of the total of 30,000 sold. This violation of the contest rules caused the SOD entry to be disqualified and the second, third and fourth-place finishers were all moved up one place. The scandal caused the collapse of the AV Open contest and the official website was closed down.

Final standing were as follows:

Winners - 2007 AV Open

- 1st Place: S1 - Hyper Risky Mosaic - Special Bath House Tsubaki (ハイパーギリギリモザイク 特殊浴場 TSUBAKI 貸切入浴料1億円) with Sora Aoi, Akiho Yoshizawa, Honoka, Sho Nishino, Asami Ogawa, Yuma Asami, MO ☆ MO, Mako Katase, Chinatsu Izawa, Megumi Haruka, Karin & China Miyu
- 2nd Place: Crystal-Eizou - Celebrity Debut - Misa Kikoden (芸能人★デビュー！！ きこうでんみさ) with Misa Kikoden
- 3rd Place: Moodyz - Dream School 11 (ドリーム学園11) with Nayuka Mine, ICHIKA, Chihiro Hara, Erina Kurosawa, Akira Shiratori, Rico, Nami Kimura, Natsuki Ijima & Miina Minamoto

The Lily Franky Honorary President Prizes were given to the S1 and Moodyz entries and also to the Natural High video World Amsterdam (アムステルダムハイ) starring Misaki Asou and the Waap Entertainment entry Deep Lesbian & Hot Semen & Black Fuck (熱吻ブラック) co-starring Marin and Shiho, and directed by K*WEST.

Winners - 2007 AV Open Challenge Stage

- 1st Place: Captain Ehara (Cross) for Anal Splash Thick Lesbian United! (肛門潮吹き極太合体レズビアン) with Chihiro Hara, Hotaru Akane & Sakura Sakurada
- 2nd Place: R40 (Dream Ticket) for How to New Half (はじめてのニューハーフ 月野姫) starring Hime Tsukino
- 3rd Place: AD Tsujiyama (Deep's) for Finding Leah DiXXzon in Europe and US (リア・デ○ゾンちゃんを探しに欧米に行っちゃいました！)

The Lily Franky Honorary President Prize was given to Anal Splash Thick Lesbian United!

== 2008 AV GrandPrix ==
The demise of the AV Open contest due to fraud in 2007 deprived the AV industry of a popular and useful means of getting publicity and setting standards. An alternative, the similar AV GrandPrix awards (AVグランプリ2008), was set up for 2008 by an SOD rival company, Hokuto Corporation (whose members include S1 and Moodyz). Winners were selected by a combination of sales volume and user votes. Sales in stores were combined with those from the DMM website. Each AV company picked a single video for entry in the contest which ran from December 1, 2007, to January 31, 2008. As with the AV Open contest, all participant videos were specially labeled and were given ID numbers beginning with AVGP or AVGL. A total of 77 companies competed, 39 in the main contest (GrandPrix Stage) and 38 in the Mania Stage for odd and fetish oriented material. Awards were also given in a number of sub-categories which had a more limited number of entries.

The results were announced on February 21, 2008. The main award "GrandPrix Highest Award", determined by user votes at the DMM website, paid 5 million yen (about $50,000), the two Stage awards, "GrandPrix Highest Stage Award" and "Mania Stage Highest Award" were determined by sales and paid 3 million yen (about $30,000) each while the Distribution Sales Award for online digital delivery paid 1 million yen (about $10,000). The other 12 Stage awards for individual categories paid 1 million yen (about $10,000) each and were determined by user votes. One of these was for packaging, 10 were on particular themes, and there were also awards voted on by the press and by video distributors. In addition, there were twelve special prizes of 500,000 yen (about $5,000) each for a total prize pool of 30 million yen (about $300,000).

Winners - 2008 AV Grand Prix Awards

GrandPrix Highest Award

- Kawaii Special (kawaii* special ギザカワユス！) [Kawaii AVGL-012] with Yuri Kousaka & Miku Ohashi

GrandPrix Stage Highest Award

- Confirmed x Confirmed x Girigiri Mosaic (了解×了解×ギリギリモザイク Wギリギリモザイク) [S1 AVGL-007] with Nao Mizuki & Minori Hatsune, directed by Zack Arai

Mania Stage Highest Award

- Female Body Torture Laboratory 11 (女体拷問研究所 11) [Baby AVGP-030] with Rika Nagasawa & Yoko

Distribution Sales Award

- Female Body Torture Laboratory 11 (女体拷問研究所 11) [Baby AVGP-030] with Rika Nagasawa & Yoko

Best Package Design

- Confirmed x Confirmed x Girigiri Mosaic (了解×了解×ギリギリモザイク Wギリギリモザイク) [S1 AVGL-007] with Nao Mizuki & Minori Hatsune, directed by Zack Arai

Best SM Video

- Human Terrible Wrapper (人間酷包 友田真希) [Mill AVGL-026] with Maki Tomoda

Best Featured Actress Video

- Race Queen Climax Squirt AV Debut (現役レースクイーン絶頂潮吹きAVデビュー！！ 冬月かえで) [Premium AVGL-024] with Kaede Fuyutsuki, directed by Tadanori Usami

Best Mature Video

- Sayuri Shiraishi, Stepmother Slave (義母奴隷 白石さゆり) [Goro Tameike AVGL-018] with Sayuri Shiraishi, directed by Goro Tameike

Best Amateur Video

- Final Mariko (まり子 ファイナル) [HMJM AVGP-025] with Mariko and directed by Company Matsuo

Best Variety Video

- How to Make Your "chin-chin" Grow 3cm (チンチンが3cm大きくなるDVD 気持ちいいオナニーで大きくなれる（秘）トレーニング指南) [Soft On Demand AVGP-046] with Kaho Kasume, Yuko Sakurai, Moe Ooishi, Rika Nagasawa, Nana Saeki & Anri Suzuki

Best Miscellaneous Video (AV Cast Memorial Grand Prix)

- Shimiken's Private 7 FUCK (しみけんのプライベート7FUCK ) [IdeaPocket AVGL-001] Starring actor Ken Shimizu with Chihiro Hara, Mangetsu Sakuragawa, Nene, Kaede Akina, Natsuki Sugisaki, Yua Aida & Marin

Best Fetish Video

- Extraordinary Pantyhose Play (非日常的パンスト遊戯 第一章) [AVS AVGL-006] with Nana Saeki & Moe Ooishi

Best Moe Child Video

- Asuka 2 (あすか2) [Innocence AVGL-028] with Asuka

Best Lesbian Video

- Insult Lesbian Training (陵辱レズ調教 羞恥と快楽に溺れゆく女達。 ) [U&K AVGP-037] with Chisato Shoda, Ren Hitomi, Rio Nakayama & Misaki Asou

Press Award - (Tie)

- Final Mariko (まり子 ファイナル) [HMJM AVGP-025] with Mariko and directed by Company Matsuo
- Confirmed x Confirmed x Girigiri Mosaic (了解×了解×ギリギリモザイク Wギリギリモザイク) [S1 AVGL-007] with Nao Mizuki & Minori Hatsune, directed by Zack Arai

Dealer Award

- Confirmed x Confirmed x Girigiri Mosaic (了解×了解×ギリギリモザイク Wギリギリモザイク) [S1 AVGL-007] with Nao Mizuki & Minori Hatsune, directed by Zack Arai

== 2009 AV GrandPrix ==
The 2009 contest ran from November 22, 2008, to February 2009. There were 97 participants competing for 30 million yen ($300,000) in prize money. In addition to the main prizes AV GrandPrix (97 entries) decided by voters at the DMM website, Digital Sales (97 entries), and DVD Sales (97 entries), there were also separate awards for Featured Actress 2009 (14 entries), Violence 2009 (15 entries), Mature Woman 2009 (15 entries), Amateur 2009 (16 entries), Variety 2009 (14 entries), Fetish 2009 (17 entries), and Lovely/Moe 2009 (7 entries) videos. Additionally, there were awards from dealers, news media, for packaging, and from supporters.

Results for the 2009 AV GrandPrix contest were announced February 18, 2009. The main GrandPrix Award determined by sales and user votes at the DMM website, paid 5 million yen (about $50,000). The two main sales awards, Digital Sales and DVD Sales each paid 2 million yen (about $20,000). The Retailers Award (voted on by video stores), the Press Award (voted on by magazine and newspaper editors), the Package Design Award and the Supporters Award paid 1 million yen (about $10,000) each. The Best Video Awards in the categories Featured Actress, Violence, Mature Woman, Amateur, Variety, Fetish and Lovely (all decided by user votes) each paid 1 million yen (about $10,000). There were also twenty runner-up Special Award prizes of 500,000 yen (about $5,000) each in the various Title categories. The total prize money amounted to 30 million yen (about $300,000). The hosts for the 2009 event were former AV star Honoka and mainstream actor Nagare Hagiwara.

Winners - 2009 AV Grand Prix Awards

GrandPrix Highest Award

- Double Risky Mosaic, Rio & Yuma (Wギリモザ Rioとゆま) [S1 AVGL-109] with Yuma Asami & Rio (Tina Yuzuki), directed by Hideto Aki

Digital Sales Award

- Vomit Enema Ecstasy X (ゲロ浣腸エクスタシー X) [Dogma AVGL-130] with Mayura Hoshitsuki and Yuka Osawa, directed by TOHJIRO

DVD Sales Award

- Double Risky Mosaic, Rio & Yuma (Wギリモザ Rioとゆま) [S1 AVGL-109] with Yuma Asami & Rio (Tina Yuzuki), directed by Hideto Aki

Retailers Award

- Double Risky Mosaic, Rio & Yuma (Wギリモザ Rioとゆま) [S1 AVGL-109] with Yuma Asami & Rio (Tina Yuzuki), directed by Hideto Aki

Press Award

- The Sex Cannon Ball Ride 2009 (テレクラキャノンボール2009 賞品はまり子*Gカップ) [HMJM AVGP-136] with Mariko, directed by Company Matsuo

Best Package Design

- Double Risky Mosaic, Rio & Yuma (Wギリモザ Rioとゆま) [S1 AVGL-109] with Yuma Asami & Rio (Tina Yuzuki), directed by Hideto Aki

Supporters Award

- Incest Family (近親相姦 昭和禁断血族「母さん、この家は狂ってます」) [Glory Quest AVGP-115] with Natsumi Kitahara, Reiko Yamaguchi & Kasumi Nanase

Best Featured Actress Video

- Double Risky Mosaic, Rio & Yuma (Wギリモザ Rioとゆま) [S1 AVGL-109] with Yuma Asami & Rio (Tina Yuzuki), directed by Hideto Aki

Special Awards - Featured Actress Video

  - Virtual Story Iyarashi (癒らし。) [Audaz AVGP-103] with Nao Ayukawa
  - E-Body Special [E-Body AVGL-105] with Risa Kasumi, directed by Minami Haou
  - Oral Venus (おしゃぶりVENUS) [M's Video Group AVGL-111] with Maria Ozawa, Erika Sato & Reina Matsushima

Best Violence Video

- The QUEEN of DAS! [DAS AVGL-128] with Maria Ozawa

Special Awards - Violence Video

  - Rope Lover Masochists with Beautiful Tits (激情M淫縛調教 縄好き美乳マゾ) [Art Video AVGP-101] with Shion & Saki Otsuka, directed by Kazuya Mine
  - Decadence of Pleasure (電マ悪魔祓い儀式) [BZ Zone AVGL-127] with Miyuki Majima, Yuu Haruka & Sayaka Honami
  - Death Loop Vol. 1 [Black Baby AVGP-141] with Serina Komuro(小室芹奈) & Yusuba Hirai, directed by Baba the Babee

Best Mature Woman Video

- Incest Mother and Child Swap (近親相姦母子スワップ 僕の母親を抱かせてやるから、君の母さんをヤらせてくれ) [Takara Visual AVGP-127] with Natsumi Kitahara & Reiko Nakamori

Special Awards - Mature Woman Video

  - Slave Mother-in-Law (義母奴隷 浅倉彩音) [Goro Tameike AVGL-129] with Ayane Asakura, directed by Goro Tameike
  - Working Married Woman - Part-Time Love (働く人妻 パートタイムラブ) [Big Morkal AVGP-138] with Ren Takanashi, Asuka Ayanami, Aya Natsuki & Sayaka Kawase, directed by YUMEJI
  - Raped Female Teacher (犯された女教師) [Madonna AVGL-136] with Reiko Makihara, directed by Eitaro Haga

Best Amateur Video

- S-Cute Ex Special [S-Cute AVGP-107] with ICHIKA, Tsubomi, Nurie Mihana, Anri Kawai, Mimi Kousaka & Kurara Iijima

Special Awards - Amateur Video

  - Big Breasts 24-year-old Piano Teacher Shiofuki (潮吹き巨乳ピアノ講師 かすみ24歳) [Toyohiko AVGL-131] with Kasumi Ayase, directed by Toyohiko
  - (彼ちんスペシャル!! カップルなら！彼氏のチ○ポ彼女のマ○コ当ててみろ!!2) [Hajime-Kikaku AVGL-133] directed by Hajime
  - H Cup Boin Amateur Nakadashi (Hカップボイン素人ナマ中出し) [Mune Kyun Kissa AVGL-145] with Kyoko

Best Variety Video

- Lovely Schoolgirl's Paipan Educational Institution (制服パイパン美少女学園) [Yellow AVGL-106] with Rei Kitajima, China Yuuki, Reika Kudou & Nami

Special Awards - Variety Video

  - GAL CIR 3 [IdeaPocket AVGL-101] with 14 actresses
  - Nanpa Grandprix (ナンパグランプリ) [Hayabusa Agency AVGP-137] with 12 actresses
  - Lesbian Vampire (レズビアンヴァンパイア) [U&K AVGP-144] with Natsumi Horiguchi, Nana Saeki, Ramu Suzumiya & Ai Asho

Best Fetish Video

- Big Hip Cowgirls (デカ尻JKのピストン騎乗位DX) [Aroma Planning AVGL-103] with Keito Inamori, Rina Aina, Aki Nagase, Risa Sanada, Aoba Ito, Rui Yazawa, Arisa Suzuki & Yui Kodama

Special Awards - Fetish Video

  - Hot Chocolate AV Grand Prix 2009 Limited [Digital Ark AVGP-130] with Rina Aina & Yume Ayaka
  - Tsubomi - Semen Club (蕾に滴る野蛮な汁) [Waap Entertainment AVGP-148] with Tsubomi, directed by Takuan

Best Lovely / Moe Video

- Tera-Dick (Real Creampie Absolute Angel) (真正中出しの絶対アングル テラちんぽ) [Miruki Ipurin AVGL-141] with Yuka Osawa

Special Award - Lovely / Moe Video

  - Lolita Pretty and Sex (ロリータ美少女と性交) [Dream Ticket AVGP-133] with Alice

== 2014 AV Open ==
Seven years after the last AV Open awards in 2007, the competition was reactivated as AV Open 2014, under the sponsorship of the Intellectual Property Promotion Association (IPPA) (知的財産振興協会). As previously, the contest was for sales over a set period of time at retail adult video outlets. AV Open 2014 officially opened with a press conference on May 27, 2014. Videos were submitted by the manufacturers on May 30, and the results were announced in November 2014. Seventy-five adult video production companies submitted entries for the competition. The companies were sorted into three groups for the competition: very large makers in the Super Heavyweight (スーパーヘビー級) class, large makers in the Heavyweight (ヘビー級) class, and smaller makers in the Middleweight (ミドル級) class. Prizes were awarded in the overall competition and for winners in the individual classes. Ten companies were in the Super Heavyweight class, twenty-nine in the Heavyweight class and the remaining thirty-six in the Middleweight class. A special prize was also awarded for sales from the online distributor DMM.

Prize money for the awards were: 5 million yen (about US$45,000) for Grand Prix, 2 million yen (US$18,000), 1 million yen (US$9000), and 500,000 yen (US$4500) for 1st, 2nd and 3rd Place in the Super Heavyweight class, 1.5 million yen (US$13,500), 700,000 yen (US$6250), and 300,000 yen (US$2700) for the Heavyweight Class, and 1 million yen (US$9000), 500,000 yen (US$4500) and 200,000 yen (US$1800) for the Middleweight Class.

Winners - 2014 AV Open

Grand Prix

- Moodyz - Anal Bukkake Fuck Now! (ぶっかけ中出しアナルFUCK！) - Starring Minako Komukai, directed by Katsuyuki Hasegawa

DMM.R18 Distribution Sales Prize

- Honnaka - 100 Person Nakadashi Ai Uehara (100人×中出し 上原亜衣) - Starring Ai Uehara, directed by Tiger Sakei

Super Heavyweight Class

First Place
- Moodyz - Anal Bukkake Fuck Now! (ぶっかけ中出しアナルFUCK！) - Starring Minako Komukai, directed by Katsuyuki Hasegawa
Second Place
- S1 No. 1 Style - Video That Packs a Punch V - Comprehensive Angle of Tits and Ass Together Presented Before Your Very Eyes (迫力映像V 乳・尻・結合が目前に迫る徹底アングル 宇都宮しをん) - Starring Shion Utsonomiya, directed by Hideto Aki
Third Place
- Idea Pocket - BEACHY VENUS - Starring Aino Kishi, Airi Kijima & Mayu Nozomi, directed by Beach Boys (ビーチクボーイズ)

Heavyweight Class

First Place
- Honnaka - 100 Person Nakadashi Ai Uehara (100人×中出し 上原亜衣) - Starring Ai Uehara, directed by Tiger Sakei
Second Place
- Prestige - Nakadashi Camp (中出しキャンプ) - Starring Honoka Minami, Sakurako Umemiya, Natsuki Hasegawa, Mayu Honoka, Haruka Chisei, Haruna Ikoma & Natsumi Iku, directed by San Michuru (みちるサン)
Third Place
- DANDY - Wild Kingdom (Special Edition) - Screwing Raw With African Natives (野性の王国 特別編 アフリカ原住民と生中出しをヤる) - Starring AIKA, directed by Sakkun

Middleweight Class

First Place
- DEEP'S - Call On! Female College Students Limited Magic Mirror Issue Thorough Verification! Friendship Between Men And Women Is Approved!? ... (顔出し！女子大生限定 マジックミラー号 徹底検証！男女の友情は成立する！？ ...) - Amateur cast, directed by Luminax
Second Place
- Goro Tameike - 27-Year-Old Talent Married For Five Years, She's Taking Non-Nude Erotica to the Limit (結婚5年目 27歳 人妻タレント 決意の限界着エロ 東 凛) - Starring Rin Azuma, directed by Goro Tameike
Third Place
- Aroma Planning - Little Devil JK Bold Skirt Collection Special - Large Number Of People Provocation Version (小悪魔JK 大胆パンチラコレクション Special 大人数挑発バージョン) - Starring Yūki Natsume, Hibiki Ōtsuki, Ruka Kanae, Marie Konishi, Nanase Otoha, Tsugumi Taketou, Aina Takahashi, Reina Ōmori & Yoku Ayumi, directed by Kijin Kasai (笠井貴人)
