= Soft On Demand =

Japanese adult video group of companies

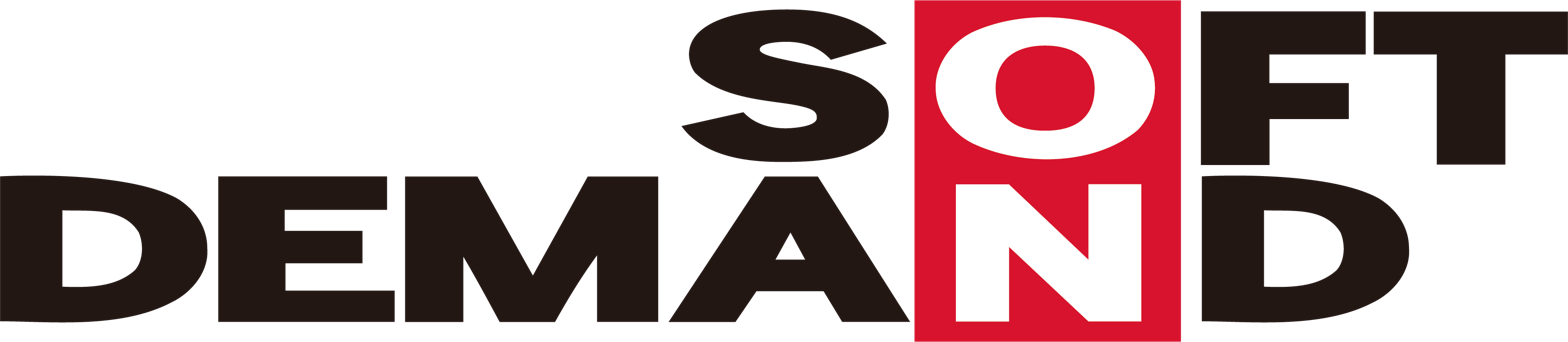

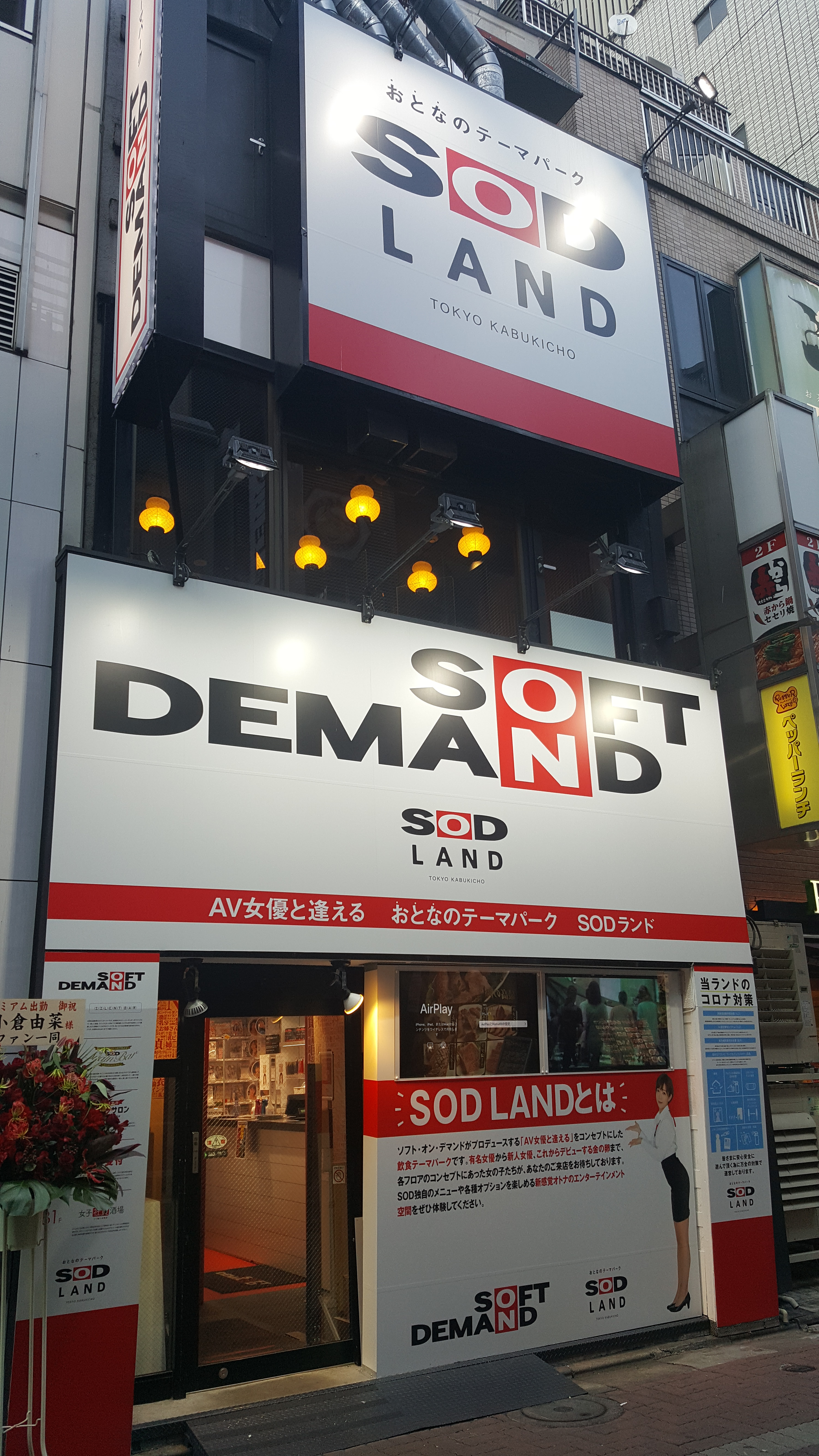
- Industry: Pornography
- Founded: 1995
- Founder: Ganari Takahashi
- Headquarters: Nakano, Tokyo, Japan
- Number of employees: 128
- Website: SOFT ON DEMAND Corporate website

Soft On Demand (ソフト・オン・デマンド, Sofuto On Demando), often known as SOD, is a Japanese adult video group of companies which has its headquarters in the Nakano ward of Tokyo. SOD was founded in December 1995 by Ganari Takahashi, who retired from the company in March 2005 and is currently working in agriculture. The company is one of the largest adult video companies in Japan and is notable for its creative approach to adult videos.

== Company information ==
=== Finances ===
In 2009, the company, under president Chie Sugawara (菅原 千恵), had 128 employees (27 male and 101 female) and a capital of 100 million yen (about US$1.1 million). For the fiscal year ending March 31, 2009, SOD had total sales of 14.9 billion yen (about US$165 million) and a profit of 670 million yen (about US$7.4 million). For 2007 the figures were sales of 13.5 billion yen (about US$120 million) and profit of 900 million yen (about US$8 million). SOD has been a fast-growing company since its foundation, going from sales of 300 million yen in 1996 to 1.5 billion in 1998 to 4.1 billion in 2000, 7.8 billion in 2003, and 9 billion in 2005. In spite of its rapid growth, it was overtaken in sales volume in the early 2000s by rival AV producer Hokuto, which also absorbed some of SOD's former companies. After peaking in 2008, Hokuto sales have plunged while annual income at SOD has stayed level at about 15 billion yen (about US$150 million) for the 2008-2010 period allowing it to become once again the largest adult video group in Japan.

=== Products ===
One director has described their product this way: "SOD's porno is ridiculous. There's nothing really sordid about it" and "different to anything else in the porno world". Some of its most notable approaches have been quiz shows that tested the knowledge of AV (adult video) actresses with challenging questions, CFNM (clothed female, naked male) videos that have women studying a man's penis (the "Uniforms, Undies and All Naked School Multi-Story" series), and plots where women are put under hypnosis. There have also been nude sports series, the senior citizen epic "All Naked Nursing Home for the Elderly", Company Sex Parties, Summer Festivals (a festival focused on penises and not to be confused with the actual Shinto festival dealing with fertility) and Sex Camps.

One of their releases from May 2006, 500 Person Sex (500人SEX), features 250 couples having sex (apart from each other but in the same room) in an impressive synchronized way, and thus got some raised eyebrows from occidental adult sites. The video received a special jury award at the 2006 AV Open.

By 2003, SOD was releasing more than 1,000 adult video titles per year. SOD also works with a number of companies in other areas and has thus become a group of companies mainly in the area of producing adult videos. Besides producing videos the company also produces condoms and lubricant lotions, PC games (aka hentai games), and adult anime.

Outside of the adult area, SOD is also involved in producing softcore and genre movies, idol videos and TV programs. Among their mainstream movies, some have featured SOD AV actresses including the 2008 horror film Yoroi Samurai Zombie with Nana Natsume and the 2006 comedy-drama Tokyo Daigaku Monogatari, directed by Tatsuya Egawa and featuring Sasa Handa. A third entry was the 2014 science fiction film Danger Dolls, with SOD star Mana Sakura making an appearance.

In 2004, the company announced plans to produce an adaptation of the Shougakukan Big Comic Original manga series Ajisai no Uta (Song of Hydrangea) as an original video animation (OVA) for a general audience. Volume 1 of the series was released in August 2004 and the fourth and final volume came out in December of that year.

=== SOD Create ===
Internally, SOD outsources work to its individual units, original video production being done by SOD Create Inc. (SODクリエイト株式会社) headed by Daisuke Kasai (葛西 大祐). This affiliate, founded in March 1999, was originally called Hamlet (ハムレット, Hamuretto) and changed its name to SOD Create in 2001.

Package design for SOD is the realm of another division, SOD Artworks (SODアートワークス), founded in 2004, and under the leadership of Yoshino Toshimitsu (吉野敏充).

Since its inception, SOD has produced over 7,500 movies starring some of the most prominent JAV actresses. The company has also made a significant shift towards producing more virtual reality content in recent years, and even went as far as to build an adult theme park in the heart of Tokyo, also known as SOD Land.

==== Labels ====
In addition to the SOD label, SOD Create has produced videos under the following labels:

- Eighteen
- ON
- Otis
- Princess
- SOD Cinderella
- Senz
- Star

==== Directors ====
Directors who have worked at SOD include:

- Keita No.1
- Kei Morikawa
- Sakkun (サックン)
- [Jo]Style
- Goro Tameike
- TOHJIRO
- Hajime Yarigasaki

==== Actresses ====
Many well-known AV Idols have performed for SOD:

- Hotaru Akane
- Risa Coda
- Sasa Handa
- Saori Hara
- Hikari Hino
- Rinako Hirasawa
- Asuka Hoshino
- Naoko Imokawa
- Kaho Kasumi
- Risa Kasumi
- Mariko Kawana
- Iori Kogawa
- Kotono
- Hiromi Matsuura
- Miyu Misaki
- Tsugumi Nagasawa
- Nana Natsume
- Nao Oikawa
- Yuka Osawa
- Mana Sakura
- Yuko Sakurai
- Sarah
- Yuu Shiraishi
- Asami Sugiura
- Yui Takagi
- Tsubomi
- Hime Tsukino
- Kaoruko Wakaba
- Akira Watase
- Rico Yamaguchi
- Sally Yoshino
- Aimi Yoshikawa
- Saisai Itsuki

==== Series ====
Important thematic series at SOD include:

- Eighteen
- Idol Semen (アイドルザーメン)
- Masturbation Aid (のお手伝いしてあげる)
- Naked Continent (裸の大陸)
- Super High-Class Soap Lady (超高級ソープ嬢)

=== STOP! STD ===
For the past several years, SOD has run a campaign to bring attention to the rise of sexually transmitted diseases (STD) in Japan and to increase the use of condoms. The program, called STOP! STD, has used former SOD star Nana Natsume as a spokeswoman.

=== SOD AV Awards and the AV Open ===
From 2002 to 2006, the company held the SOD AV Awards, an annual ceremony to present a series of awards to honor actresses, directors, and staff of companies in the SOD group. In 2006, the company also sponsored, along with Tokyo Sports, a wider award contest called the AV Open. Sixteen companies competed for a total prize pool of 25 Million yen with the winner being decided by sales of the videos entered in the contest.

In the second year of the AV Open competition, 19 companies participated and the SOD entry won by a large margin. But it was subsequently discovered that SOD had used company funds to buy thousands of their own videos. SOD was disqualified and the discredited AV Open was replaced the next year by the Hokuto Corporation sponsored AV Grand Prix.

== Content Soft Association ==
The Japanese AV industry has several different "ethics groups", which are voluntary organizations to assure adherence with Japanese pornography laws and to regulate content and copyrights. The earliest of these organizations was founded by the major AV companies in 1972 and is known as the Nihon Ethics of Video Association (NEVA). In response, SOD in 1996 began its own regulatory group known as the Media Ethics Association (メディア倫理協会, Media Rinri Kyōkai; usually abbreviated as Medirin (メディ倫)). Medirin was composed of "indie" companies, independent AV studios which explored porn themes forbidden by NEVA rules and which used a smaller-pixeled censorship mosaic for their videos. Medirin was re-organized in 2005 to form the Content Soft Association (CSA) (コンテンツ・ソフト協同組合, Kontentsu Sofuto Kyōdō Kumiai) to review and regulate adult videos and adult game software. The CSA had more than 65 members among AV producers comprising most of the SOD group and some other major companies. In November 2010, the organization was dissolved and the Ethics Organization of Video took its place.

Members

- SOD
- Akinori
- APA
- Aroma Planning
- CineMagic
- Deep's
- Global Media Entertainment

- Glory Quest
- Hayabusa Agency
- Hibino
- IEnergy
- LadyxLady
- Milky Pictures
- Natural High

- Rocket
- Sadistic Village
- Shima Planning
- Style Art
- V&R Products

== Companies in the SOD group ==
This is a list of the companies that were part of the SOD group as of June 2010.

- SOD Create (SODクリエイト)
- Deep's (ディープス) (Joined October 1999)
- Natural High (ナチュラルハイ) (Joined August 1999)
- IEnergy (アイエナジー) (Joined December 2000)
- Hibino (ヒビノ) (Joined September 2002)
- SugarBOY (シュガーボーイ) (Joined December 2002)- produces anime videos
- V&R Products (V&Rプロダクツ) (Joined April 2004)
- Cutie & Honey (シーアンドエイチ)
- Ifrit (イフリート) (Joined June 2005)
- Akinori (AKNR) (アキノリ) (Joined January 2006)
- DANDY (Joined August 2006)
- WOMAN (Joined September 2006)
- LADY×LADY (Joined January 2007)
- Hunter
- Garcon (ギャルソン)
- Sadistic Village (サディスティックヴィレッジ)
- Rocket
- Ningen Kousatsu (Human Inquiry)
- Around
- 37 °C Binetsu (anime)
- Keu
- Glamorous Candy (グラマラスキャンディ) (softcore)
- TENGA (masturbators)
- New Sexual (gay)

== Former companies in the SOD group ==
Below are a list of companies that have left the SOD group:

- Wanz Factory
- Sandwich
- Aroma Planning (アロマ企画) (now part of Hokuto Corporation)
- GLAY'Z
- Dogma (ドグマ) (Joined April 2001, now part of Hokuto Corporation)
- Mamedou (忠実堂) (Joined December 2001)
- Hajime-Kikaku (はじめ企画) (Joined April 2002, now part of Hokuto Corporation)
- Hand Made Vision (previously known as Dash) (ハンドメイドビジョン) (Joined November 2002)
- Shima Planning (志摩プランニング) (Joined December 2002)
- Oh-Tees (オーティス) (Joined June 2003)
- Kaimasaaki (甲斐正明事務所) (Joined January 2005, changed name to Bullitt (株式会社ブリット) January 2006)
