= H.m.p. (Japan) =

Japanese adult entertainment company

h.m.p. Co., Ltd.
- Industry: Pornography
- Founded: 1981
- Headquarters: Bunkyo, Tokyo, Japan
- Products: Adult Videos, Sex toys
- Website: http://www.hmp.jp/

h.m.p. Co., Ltd. (株式会社h.m.p, Kabushiki gaisha h.m.p), formerly known as Houyuu Media Produce (芳友メディアプロデ), is a Japanese company which is involved in adult entertainment including the production and sales of adult videos (AV) and the marketing of adult toys and sex aids.

== Company information ==
The company, headquartered in the Bunkyo ward of Tokyo, was founded in 1981 under the name Samm (サムビデオ, Samu Bideo), making it one of Japan's oldest adult video firms. The Samm label's name was taken from S&M and that genre dominated the company's videos in the early 1980s but the direction changed in the mid-1980s under the influence of three directors, Kaoru Toyoda, Ryutaro Kanno and Yukihiko Shimamura. In 1984 the Miss Christine label was created for videos with single featured actresses. The Tiffany label came later and was made popular by actress Hikaru Hoshino.

Among early AV actresses who performed for h.m.p. were Keiko Nakazawa who appeared for the Samm label with the video Pakkeeji Zenmen o Hyōji released in 1986, Rena Murakami, who debuted on the company's Miss Christine label in March 1988, and AV Idol Yumika Hayashi who made her debut with the Miss Christine video Shigamitsuku 18-sai: ojōsama wa shitanai in June 1989. In the decade of the 1990s, Maiko Yūki also made her debut with h.m.p.'s Miss Christine label.

Bringing his own particular style was former pink film director and screenwriter Shuji Kataoka who joined the company in the early 1990s. Another influential director at h.m.p. was Company Matsuo who made videos with the studio starting in 1996 while he was still primarily working for V&R Planning.

At the beginning of 2010, h.m.p. had a capital of 100 million yen (about $1 million). Their official website h.m.p.online sells a variety of goods including adult DVDs (some on Blu-ray), downloadable video content and adult toys. The website also contains a valuable database of over 3700 h.m.p. titles which can be searched by title, series, genre, media and date.

=== UMD videos ===
In July 2005, h.m.p., along with two other Japanese AV producers (Glay'z and TMA), attempted to expand their offerings into a new medium. In the controversial venture frowned upon by Sony, h.m.p. offered adult videos for UMD media, the proprietary disc format used in the Sony PlayStation Portable (PSP). By early 2006, according to company spokesperson Yumiko Okazaki, sales in Japan "weren't bad" but were far less than the same titles on DVD or VHS. She said the company would release another set in 2006. They were also offered overseas by JList.com whose founder, Peter Payne, estimated sales of UMD discs at about 500 a month. The provocative h.m.p. advertising campaign for the PSP discs touted the advantages of portable porn.

The discs featured such h.m.p. superstars as Risa Coda and Hikaru Koto and in addition to two hours of video, many contained adult minigames playable on the PSP. The last of the discs, labeled with ID codes HOUM-00001 to HOUM-00013, was released April 21, 2006.

== h.m.p. labels ==
h.m.p. has produced videos under a number of labels including the basic h.m.p. label which uses production codes beginning in HODV or HRDV. Other labels past and present include:

- Tiffany
- Platinum Tiffany
- Diamond Tiffany
- Girls Tiffany
- ForYou
- Hoyusha
- Chu
- Cream
- Video Bank
- Miss Christine
- Samm
- Jamm
- Petit Chri
- Ace
- SEX9
- Aqua
- G
- Kitan Club (S&M / Bondage)

== See also ==
- Nihon Ethics of Video Association (NEVA)
