= Honoka =

Japanese TV personality, AV actress and writer

- 穂花
- Born: Ai Shimomura; September 2, 1982 (age 43); Kagoshima Prefecture, Japan

Honoka (Japanese: 穂花, Hepburn: Honoka) is a Japanese TV personality, actress, writer and former adult video (AV) performer who retired from the AV industry in 2008.

== Life and career ==
Honoka was born Ai Shimomura in Kagoshima Prefecture, Japan. She is a licensed practical nurse and has appeared as a race queen at the 2004 Suzuka 8 Hours endurance race (July 2004). She plays the guitar, enjoys swimming and volleyball, going to Kabuki theatre and walking her dog. Like fellow AV Idols Sora Aoi and Nana Natsume, she has been able to combine a career as an AV actress with mainstream movie and TV appearances.

Before she started in AV, Honoka had a small role as a Gynoid secretary in the TV Tokyo cosplay drama The Ultimate Venus Angel Healing Force (究極癒し戦隊ヴィーナスエンジェル) which she was in from February 16 to March 29, 2004.

=== AV actress ===
Honoka began her adult video career in June 2004 with Bud for the Try-Heart Corporation on their Sexia label. She made several more videos with Try-Heart over the next 18 months and in March 2006, she starred in videos for two new AV studios, Sell Debut x Risky Mosaic, directed by Hideto Aki, at S1 No. 1 Style and Deep Impact - Honoka Sell Debut for the Premium Glamour label. She continued working with the two studios, usually appearing in one video every alternating month for each studio. Her last original work with S1 was released in January 2008, but she continued to make films with Premium until her retirement. Both S1 and Premium are affiliated with Japan's largest producer of adult videos, the Hokuto Corporation.

During Honoka's AV career, she worked for studios which specialized in softer, more glamour-oriented types of pornography, and she was one of the most popular AV actress in Japan. In the DMM listing of the top 100 actresses by sales, she placed No. 2 in 2006 and No. 3 in 2007. She also won the Nice Body award from Video Boy magazine twice, in 2005 and in 2006.

Honoka was part of the S1 compilation video Hyper – Barely There Mosaic (ハイパーギリギリモザイク) with AV idols Sora Aoi, Yua Aida, Yuma Asami, Maria Ozawa and Rin Aoki which won the 2006 AV Open competition among Japanese porn studios. She was also the recipient of the "Best Actress" prize at the 2007 Adult Broadcasting Awards for the 2006 broadcast year. After pressing her tongue against the phallus-shaped prize statuette, she declared "I never thought I would be selected. I'd like to say that it was 'my pleasure' to my fans." In closing, she added "I want to be more famous in the AV field" and "I also want to encourage other girls to strive to be the best. Honoka was again honored by fans by winning the Best Actress award in the 2006 AV Actress Grand Prix. Another of her S1 videos, Hyper Risky Mosaic - Special Bath House Tsubaki (ハイパーギリギリモザイク 特殊浴場 TSUBAKI 貸切入浴料1億円), with 11 other S1 actresses was the First Place winning entry in the 2007 AV Open contest.

Honoka announced in her Official Blog that she was retiring in December 2008 and that her December 7, 2008 video for Premium, Pleasures of Education, would be her last. She participated in one final event for Premium by making a round of publicity appearances at Tokyo shops on December 20, 2008. She also acted as co-host with mainstream actor Nagare Hagiwara for the 2009 AV Grand Prix ceremony. She has continued to keep her blog open.

In 2012, the major Japanese adult video distributor DMM held a poll of its customers to choose the 100 all time best AV actresses to celebrate the 30th anniversary of adult videos in Japan. Honoka finished in 37th place in the balloting.

=== TV appearances ===
Honoka was in the J-dorama Shimokita GLORY DAYS (下北GLORY DAYS) along with fellow S1 actresses Sora Aoi and Yuma Asami and singer-actress Aya Sugimoto. The 12-week series aired on TV Tokyo beginning in April 2006. She played the character Nishina Natsume in the series which is based on the manga of the same name and revolves about a ronin student moving to Tokyo and sharing a house with several beautiful women. She was also in the TV romantic comedy Cupid no Itazura (クピドの悪戯) on TV Tokyo which ran for 11 weeks beginning October 13, 2006 and concerned a young man with the rare disease of "rainbow balls" which limits the number of times he can have sex in his life. In addition, Honoka played the character of Keiko in the third episode ("OL Manager") of the Fuji TV drama Unusual Story Fall '06 Special Edition (世にも奇妙な物語 '06秋の特別編) on October 2, 2006. In late 2009, she made a guest appearance in the first season of the television series The Ancient Dogoo Girl, a comic tokusatsu show directed by Noboru Iguchi. She has also appeared as a guest on a number of TV variety shows.

In the tokusatsu Super Sentai parody Unofficial Sentai Akibaranger, she played the role of the chief villain Malseena in the BS Asahi TV series which ran from April 6, 2012, to June 29, 2012. A 2nd season was announced in January 2013, and debuted April 5, 2013 with Honoka returning as Malseena.

=== Film appearances ===
In addition to several softcore V-Cinema videos, Honoka has also been featured in mainstream movies. She starred in award-winning director Toru Kamei's film Watching Fuckin' TV All Time Makes a Fool (テレビばかり見てると馬鹿になる, Terebi Bakari Miteruto Bakani Naru) based on the manga of the same name by Naoki Yamamoto. The film was first released June 9, 2007 at a late show at the Pole Pole cinema in Higashi-Nakano and later (July 25, 2007) as a DVD. She also had a major role in Noboru Iguchi's over-the-top action-horror gorefest The Machine Girl which premiered at the Yubari International Fantastic Film Festival on March 22, 2008, and was released as a DVD on June 3, 2008.

Honoka also had a role in the June 2008 theatrical drama Dekotora no shu: Hinokuni kumamoto (デコトラの鷲（しゅう） 其の五 火の国熊本親子特急便) directed by Hideyuki Katsuki. The film, fifth in the Dekotora no shu series, starred Show Aikawa and also featured pink film actress Junko Miyashita and AV actress Maria Yumeno. Honoka continued her mainstream film career in 2009 by starring in the Tōru Kamei directed drama Hectopascal (ヘクトパスカル～疼く女～, Hectopascal: Uzuku onna) which premiered at the Tsutaya theatre in Shibuya, Tokyo on December 15, 2009 and was released as a DVD on January 22, 2010, by AMG.

In 2012, she starred in director Junpei Matsumoto's debut film, Mada, ningen (まだ、人間), a drama of disaffected youth in Tokyo, which reached theaters in May 2012. In his review of the film, critic Mark Schilling calls her acting surprising for a former AV actress, characterizing her performance as "committed, if slightly awkward." In October 2012 she played the part of Eleena in the action movie Space Sheriff Gavan: The Movie (宇宙刑事ギャバン THE MOVIE, Uchū keiji Gyaban: The Movie), commemorating the thirtieth anniversary of the Space Sheriff Gavan TV series. In 2013, she was cast as Sakura in the manga-based thrillers Tokyo Yamimushi Parts I and II, directed by Sakichi Sato. Both films were released on September 28, 2013.

=== Literary activities ===
Honoka authored two books in 2009, Little Sex Devil (小悪魔セックス), on sex and sexuality for publisher Best Sellers (ベストセラーズ), in January 2009 (ISBN 458412213X), and Pleasures of the Body, Shape of Love (体の快楽 愛のカタチ), five short stories about "men and women" published by Futabasha (双葉社) in July 2009 (ISBN 4575153494).

On January 18, 2010, she released an autobiographical work, Kago Biography of Honoka: Mama, I Love You (ISBN 4-07-270580-2). The book, published by Shufunotomo (主婦の友社), gives an account of her childhood which involved kidnappers, and sexual and physical abuse. She says she was tricked into her AV debut, thinking she was going to make a CD. Honoka's book is one of a number of memoirs by actresses about the AV industry harking back to Ai Iijima's semi-autobiographical novel Platonic Sex in 2000, and including Mihiro's partially fictionalized autobiography nude from 2009 and Saori Hara's My Real Name Is Mai Kato: Why I Became an AV Actress from December 2009, which adult media reporter Rio Yasuda sees as marking a trend in which the AV industry is being assimilated into popular culture.

== Bibliography ==
- Little Sex Devil (小悪魔セックス)(ISBN 458412213X) (January 2009)
- Pleasures of the Body, Shape of Love (体の快楽 愛のカタチ)(ISBN 4575153494) (July 2009)
- Kago Biography of Honoka: Mama, I Love You (ISBN 4-07-270580-2) (January 18, 2010)

== Filmography ==
=== Adult videos (AV) ===
Release date	Video title	Company	Director	Notes
2004-06-25	Bud 蕾 つぼみ	Try-Heart Sexia; SEA-382 (VHS)	Saburou Kobayashi	
2004-07-30	Whisper - Whisper of Beautiful Breasts; Wisper～美（エフ）乳のささやき	Try-Heart Sexia; SEA-388 (VHS)	Saburou Kobayashi	
2004-08-27	The Scent of Temptation 誘惑の香り	Try-Heart Sexia; SEA-392 (VHS)	Saburou Kobayashi	
2004-09-24	Fact Body	Try-Heart Sexia; SEA-397 (VHS)	Saburou Kobayashi	
2004-10-29	Sexy Teacher's Secret Spot 女教師の秘蜜	Try-Heart Sexia; SEA-404 (VHS)	Masato Ishioka	
2004-11-26	Ugly Dream 酷夢	Try-Heart Sexia; SEA-408 (VHS)	Masato Ishioka	
2005-02-18	Awful とびっきり	Try-Heart Sexia; SEA-419 (VHS)	Daihonzan Arakawa	
2005-04-29	RE-SEX 酷夢	Try-Heart Sexia; SEA-429 (VHS)	Kyosuke Murayama	
2005-05-29	Venus Style	Cosmos Plan; IA-177 (VHS) RMD-335 (DVD)	Eitaro Onuma	
2005-06-17	My Report	Try-Heart Sexia; SRV-114	Zack Arai	
2005-06-25	Honoka Nude	Shuffle; SFLB-027	Kousuke Kisaragi	Gravure (non-sex)
2005-12-11	Soap Goddess ソープの女神さま	Cosmos Plan; RMD-410	Toyozo	
2006-01-20	Tawdry Goddess ふしだらな女神	Try-Heart Sexia; SRV-146	Yuya Natsuiro	
2006-02-12	Obscene MAX 猥褻MAX	Cosmos Plan; RMD-432	Yuya Natsuiro	
2006-03-07	Deep Impact - Honoka Sell Debut ディープインパクト 穂花セルデビュー	Premium Glamorous; PGD-001	Tadanori Usami	
2006-03-19	Sell Debut x Risky Mosaic セル初×ギリギリモザイク	S1; ONED-381	Hideto Aki	
2006-04-07	Honoka Support - Your Masturbation Time 穂花がサポート アナタのオナニータイム	Premium Glamorous; PGD-006	Tadanori Usami	
2006-05-07	Sex on the Beach, Southern Island Pakopako! SEX ON THE BEACH～南の島でパコパコ！	S1; ONED-422	Hideto Aki	
2006-05-26	Best Selection ベストセレクション	Cosmos Plan; MDS-360		Compilation
2006-06-07	Premium Beauty プレミアム・ビューティー	Premium Glamorous; PGD-016	Tadanori Usami	With Sayuki
2006-07-07	Six Costumes Pakopako! 6つのコスチュームでパコパコ！	S1; ONED-475	KINGDOM	
2006-08-07	Glamorous Sex グラマラス・セックス	Premium Glamorous; PGD-026	Zack Arai	
2006-08-07	Hyper – Barely There Mosaic ハイパーギリギリモザイク	S1; ONSD-028		Compilation; With Sora Aoi, Yua Aida, Maria Ozawa & Yuma Asami; 2006 AV Open winner
2006-09-07	Delusional Special Bath 妄想的特殊浴場	S1; ONED-524	Hideto Aki	
2006-10-07	Lascivious Nurse 痴女ナース	Premium Glamorous; PGD-036		
2006-11-07	Pakopako Newlywed Life With Honoka 穂花とのパコパコ新婚生活	S1; ONED-587	Ishibashi Wataru	
2006-12-07	Alluring Female Teacher 誘惑女教師	Premium Glamorous; PGD-050		
2007-01-07	Pakopako Via Swimsuit 水着でパコパコしよっ	S1; ONED-647	Ishibashi Wataru	
2007-02-07	Kissing, Fellatio, Top to Bottom Lip 接吻、フェラチオ、全身リップ。	Premium Glamorous; PGD-066	Kyosei	
2007-03-07	Living With Yuma and Honoka ゆまと穂花との共同生活	S1; ONED-698	Hideto Aki	With Yuma Asami
2007-04-07	Premium Digital Mosaic - Honoka Special プレミアデジタルモザイク 穂花スペシャル	Premium Glamorous; PGD-082	Tadanori Usami	
2007-05-03	Hyper Risky Mosaic - Special Bath House Tsubaki ハイパーギリギリモザイク 特殊浴場 TSUBAKI 貸切入浴料1億円	S1; OPEN-0705	Hideto Aki	With Sora Aoi, Akiho Yoshizawa, Sho Nishino, Asami Ogawa, Yuma Asami, MO ☆ MO, Mako Katase, Chinatsu Izawa, Megumi Haruka, Karin & Cina Miyu -S1 entry in the 2007 AV Open -Re-released 2007-12-07 extended to 8 hours as S1 ONED-891
2007-05-07	BakoBako Gangbang 28 バコバコ乱交28	S1; ONED-743	KENGO	
2007-06-07	Extremely Lewd Fantastic Body 超淫らな絶品ボディー	Premium Glamorous; PGD-102	Zack Arai	
2007-07-07	Lewd Flesh 5 淫らな肉体5	S1; ONED-784	Midori Kohaku	
2007-08-07	Honoka's Alluring Flight 穂花の誘惑フライト	Premium Glamorous; PGD-121	Zack Arai	
2007-09-01	Digital Channel DC41	IdeaPocket Supreme SUPD-041	Alala Kurosawa	
2007-10-07	Together With Teacher Honoka - Women's Perverted Nursery 穂花センセイといっしょ オトナの変態保育園	Premium Glamorous; PGD-134	Kyosei	
2007-11-07	Repeated Death, Grand Orgasm 繰り返す昇天、壮絶アクメ。	S1; ONED-865		
2007-12-07	Special Bath House Tsubaki 8 Hours ハイパー×ギリギリモザイク 特殊浴場TSUBAKI8時間	S1; ONED-891	Hideto Aki	With 11 other actresses -Previously released 2007-05-03 in a 4-hour version as S1 OPEN-0705
2007-12-07	Alluring Female Teacher Vol.2 誘惑女教師 第二章	Premium Glamorous; PGD-144	Tadanori Usami	
2008-01-07	Hyper Risky Mosaic MV ハイパーギリギリモザイクMV	S1; ONED-901	Hideto Aki	
2008-02-07	Harem of Amazones ハーレム・オブ・アマゾネス	Premium Glamorous; PGD-159	Zack Arai	With An Nanba & Karen Kisaragi
2008-03-07	Premium Stylish Soap	Premium Glamorous; PGD-167	K.C.Takeda	
2008-04-07	Sexual Desire Goddess Honoka in New York 情欲の女神 穂花 in ニューヨーク	Premium Glamorous; PGD-176	Zack Arai	
2008-04-19	S1 Girls Collection: Hyper-Risky Mosaic 8 Hours; S1 GIRLS COLLECTION ハイパーギリギリモザイク8時間	S1; ONSD-188		Compilation
2008-05-01	Teacher Honoka's Tempting Lesson 穂花先生の誘惑授業	IdeaPocket Tissue; IPTD-350	Kyosei	
2008-06-07	Honoka's Masochistic Man Torture Special! 穂花M男責めスペシャル！	Premium Glamorous; PGD-188	Zack Arai	
2008-07-07	Honoka's Fascinate Instructor 穂花M男責めスペシャル！	Premium Glamorous; PGD-198	Zack Arai	
2008-08-01	Beauty Venus 2 穂花M男責めスペシャル！	IdeaPocket Tissue; IPSD-030	Tadanori Usami	With Koisaya & Rei Matsushita
2008-09-07	Glamorous Sex 6 穂花グラマラス6本番スーパーラグジュアリー	Premium Glamorous; PGD-213	Zack Arai	
2008-10-07	Twinkle Girlfriend 穂花が100％彼女目線でアナタとHな同棲生活。	Premium Glamorous; PGD-220	Zack Arai	
2008-11-07	Glamorous Hip Pressure - Hip & Under Lip 穂花’S 顔面騎乗スペシャル	Premium Glamorous; PGD-229	Zack Arai	
2008-12-07	Pleasures of Education 誘惑女教師～第三章～	Premium Glamorous; PGD-237	Tadanori Usami	

=== Theatrical films ===
- Watching Fuckin' TV All Time Makes a Fool (テレビばかり見てると馬鹿になる, Terebi Bakari Miteruto Bakani Naru) (June 2007)
- The Machine Girl (March 2008)
- Dekotora no shu: Hinokuni kumamoto (デコトラの鷲（しゅう） 其の五 火の国熊本親子特急便) (June 2008)
- Hectopascal (ヘクトパスカル～疼く女～, Hectopascal: Uzuku onna) (December 2009)
- Helldriver (September 2010)
- Mameshiba Ichiro 3D (マメシバ一郎 3D) (February 2012)
- Mada, ningen (まだ、人間) (May 2012)
- Space Sheriff Gavan: The Movie (宇宙刑事ギャバン THE MOVIE, Uchū keiji Gyaban: The Movie) (October 2012)
- Blindly in Love (箱入り息子の恋, Hakoiri Musuko no Koi) (June 2013)
- Tokyo Yamimushi Part I (東京闇虫 パートI) (September 2013)
- Tokyo Yamimushi Part II (東京闇虫 パートII) (September 2013)
- Tsuma ga koishita natsu (妻が恋した夏) (October 2014)

== Sources ==
- "Honoka Official Blog" (in Japanese). honoka620.exblog.jp. Archived from the original on February 10, 2009.
- "S1 Profile & Filmography" (in Japanese). www.s1s1s1.com. Archived from the original on 2015-08-21.
- "Premium Profile & Filmography" (in Japanese). www.premium-beauty.com. Archived from the original on 2008-12-01.
- "Try-Heart Profile & Filmography" (in Japanese). www.sexia.tv. Archived from the original on 2008-12-01.
