= Tadanori Usami =

Japanese adult video director

- Born: Japan
- Occupation: Film director
- Years active: about 1993–

Tadanori Usami (宇佐美忠則, Usami Tadanori) is a Japanese adult video (AV) director. He is credited with directing more than 450 videos in a career spanning over twenty years.

== Life and career ==
Usami started working as a director in the adult video industry as early as May 1993 with the video After School Love for the VIP studio. In the mid and late-1990s, he directed a number of videos for HRC and Alice Japan. By May 2003, he was directing regularly for the Moodyz studio, part of the large Japanese porn conglomerate, the Hokuto Corporation.

Over the next several years with Moodyz, Usami won a number of awards at the annual year-end Moodyz Awards ceremonies for Hokuto Corporation companies. At the 2004 Moodyz Awards, his video Digital Mosaic Vol. 37 won the top Moodyz Award, and Usami took one of the Director Awards. In 2005 he won the IdeaPocket Award for his video First Impression Rena Nagai with that company, while in 2006 he took the 2nd Place Best Director Award and won one of the Best Title Awards for Deep Impact - Honoka Sell Debut with AV idol Honoka for the AV company Premium. At the 2007 ceremony, he again took the 2nd Place Best Director Award but in 2008 won both the Best Director Award and the Best Title Award for High School Girl and Sex for IdeaPocket.

Also in 2008, Usami was given the award for the Best Featured Actress Video at the AV GrandPrix contest for his video Race Queen Climax Squirt AV Debut for AV producer Premium.

Tadanori was one of the chief directors at the IdeaPocket company having directed over 200 videos for them by April 2014 and at Premium with more than 150 video credits to his name by that same date. Usami is particularly known for introducing new actresses to adult videos, having directed about 200 of these "debut" works, about 70 of them in IdeaPocket's "First Impression" series.

Over his long career, Usami has directed several well-known AV idols including: Honoka, Tina Yuzuki (Rio), Sora Aoi, An Nanba, Yua Aida, Riko Tachibana, Kaede Matsushima, Bunko Kanazawa, Akiho Yoshizawa, and more recently, Mayu Nozomi (in her AV debut), Azumi Uehara and Aino Kishi.
