= Alala Kurosawa =

Japanese bukkake porn director

- Born: Japan
- Occupation: Film director
- Years active: 1998–

Alala Kurosawa (黒澤あらら, Kurosawa Alala), also known as Arara Kurosawa, is a Japanese adult video (AV) director who has specialized in producing videos in the Japanese porn genre of bukkake. He has been called the best in the industry at "semen" (ザーメン, zāmen) movies and by late 2011 had directed more than 300 adult videos.

== Life and career ==
Kurosawa began his career as a director with Waap Entertainment as did fellow directors Kingdom and (Jo)Style. Kurosawa directed the first videos produced by Waap, the "Dream Shower" series released in December 1998. In the "Dream Shower" series, Kurosawa combined bukkake with the gangbang genre. After several years at Waap where he directed more than fifty videos, Kurosawa went on to work for the recently formed Moodyz studio where he would direct more than 160 videos. At Moodyz he instituted a new bukkake series, "Dream Woman", which began in January 2002 with the release of Dream Woman Vol. 1 (ドリームウーマン Dream Woman Vol. 1) with Mayu Koizumi. By mid-2010 the series, all directed by Kurosawa, had reached Volume 78 starring Hitomi Tanaka.

While at Moodyz, Kurosawa was given the Best Director Award at the 2002 and 2003 Moodyz Awards ceremony. At the 2004 Moodyz Awards, he was given both a Directors Award and a Special Directors Award. When the new studio, S1 No. 1 Style, was founded in November 2004, Kurosawa was one of their first directors, releasing his bukkake themed production, Love Love Date (ラブラブデート) with Akane Mochida, in December 2004. Kurosawa also made a considerable number of videos for the IdeaPocket studio, mostly working in their popular "Digital Channel" series.

For the 2009 AV Grand Prix competition, Moodyz entered Kurosawa's video Dream Woman DX starring Maria Ozawa, Ryou Takamiya and Natsumi Horiguchi. In addition to Ozawa, over the years Kurosawa has also worked with such major AV Idols as Sora Aoi, An Nanba, Yua Aida, Honoka, Nao Oikawa, Yuma Asami and Bunko Kanazawa.
