= Mihiro =

Japanese singer and former adult actress

- 谷口 みひろ
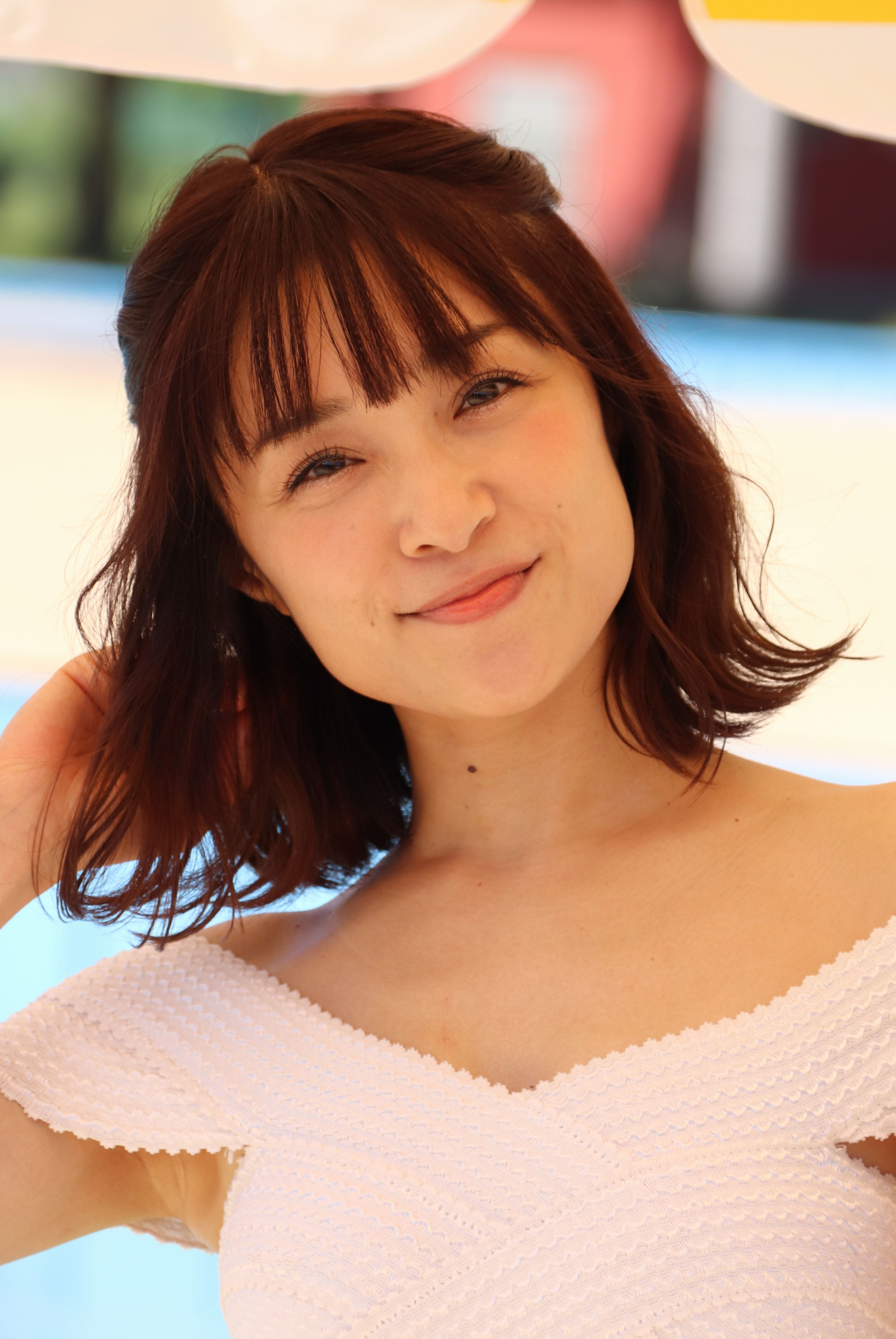
- 2022
- Born: Hiromi Yamase; May 19, 1982 (age 43); Niigata Prefecture, Japan
- Other name: Mihiro Taniguchi
- Occupations: Actress; fiction writer; singer; television personality
- Years active: 2001–present
- Website: www.mihiro.tv

Mihiro Taniguchi (Japanese: 谷口 みひろ, Hepburn: Taniguchi Mihiro), real name Hiromi Yamase (山瀬 ひろみ, Yamase Hiromi), is a Japanese actress, singer, fiction writer, television personality and former adult video (AV) actress.

== Life and career ==
Mihiro was born in Niigata prefecture on May 19, 1982. She began a career as a softcore nude model as early as May 2001 when her video Dream (どりーむ) was released followed by the publication of the similarly named photobook Dream (夢) in August 2002. She appeared in a number of other softcore nude modeling videos and photobooks over the next year and a half. Mihiro also acted in several softcore V-Cinema productions during this time including the 2003 comedy Heisei Sekuhara Bushidou (平成セクハラ武士道 たそがれ助兵衛) directed by Naoyuki Tomomatsu. and Kōji Kawano's 2004 Chakuero no onna Karina (着エロの女 KARＩNA). She was also featured as a singer in a J-Pop Maxi single titled Sunflower (ヒマワリ) for Dream Robot in October 2004.

=== AV debut – Alice Japan & MAX-A ===
Mihiro made her transition from nude model to AV actress in January 2005 when Alice Japan released her debut adult video Little Angel. A month later, she made her first video for the MAX-A studio, Super Star. For the next two and a half years until mid-2007, Mihiro made about one AV a month alternating between Alice Japan and MAX-A. At the same time, Mihiro was also appearing on TV in the TV Asahi drama Tokumei Kakarichō Tadano Hitoshi (特命係長·只野仁) or Mission Section Chief Hitoshi Tadano. She was in Episode 1 of the second year series (Whole Episode 12) of the program broadcast on January 14, 2005.

She began 2006 with a regular role in TV Tokyo's romantic comedy, 2nd House (2ndハウス, 2nd Hausu), which ran in 12 episodes from January to March 2006. In April 2006, she was one of the leads in the V-Cinema horror film, Zombie Self-Defense Force directed by pink film and horror movie director Naoyuki Tomomatsu. Throughout 2006, she continued appearing in monthly adult videos for MAX-A and Alice Japan.

In another genre, Mihiro was the star of the November 2006 V-Cinema release Yo-Yo Sexy Girl Cop (スケパン刑事 バージンネーム＝諸見栄サキ, Sukepan deka: Bājin nēmu = Moromie Saki), an erotic parody of the manga-inspired movie Yo-Yo Girl Cop. She played a teenaged undercover government agent armed with a steel yo-yo and see-through panties. One reviewer commented that Mihiro's was "the only performance of note". The DVD was released in the US with English subtitles in November 2008.

Mihiro continued her singing career with an all AV Idol group, the "Man-zoku ディーバ Divas" which originally consisted of Mihiro, Akiho Yoshizawa and Naho Ozawa. Ozawa later left the group which was eventually expanded to five singers.

Mihiro's final videos for the MAX-A and Alice Japan studios were released in the first half of 2007. She returned to TV work in 2007 as a regular cast member in the TV Asahi suspense drama Tissue (ティッシュ, Tisshu) which was broadcast April–June 2007 and she also appeared as a guest star in Episode 1 of the erotic drama Shinjuku swan (新宿スワン 歌舞伎町スカウトサバイバル, Shinjuku suwan kabukichou sukauto sabaibaru) which was aired by TV Asahi in August 2007.

=== Maxing & S1 ===
From July 2007, Mihiro began making videos with two new AV studios, Maxing and S1 No. 1 Style. She kept to her previous pattern of doing one movie per month, alternating between the two companies. At the 2007 Vegas Night Moodyz Awards, Mihiro took the 2nd Place Award for Best Actress and her debut video for S1, Hyper-Risky Mosaic Mihiro, directed by Hideto Aki, won the Best Title Award.

In the mainstream film arena, she starred as Ms Lin, the owner of a dumpling shop with a "secret ingredient", in director Kōji Kawano's 2008 V-Cinema erotic horror-comedy Cruel Restaurant. She had previously worked with Kawano in the 2004 video Chakuero no onna Karina. Along with other S1 actresses Sora Aoi, Yuma Asami and Rio, Mihiro was one of the regular cast members doing songs and comedy on the late night TV Osaka variety show Please Muscat (おねがい マスカット, Onegai Muscat) which began broadcasting in April 2008. She has also done a number of TV skits with Japanese comedian Ken Shimura.

In 2009 Mihiro continued her AV career with S1 and Maxing but she also appeared in roles in theatrical movies, the first being in March, in the drama SR: Saitama's Rapper (SR サイタマノラッパー, SR: Saitama no rappā), also known as 8000 Miles. The movie, directed by Yū Irie, follows a group of aspiring rap singers in Tokyo's Saitama prefecture. The film was awarded the Grand Prix at the 19th Yubari International Fantastic Film Festival in 2009. In June 2009 she was in Ju-on: White Ghost / Black Ghost, part of the famous Japanese Ju-on series re-made in the US as The Grudge. Later, in July she had a part in the action-horror gore-fest by director Kengo Kaji, Samurai Princess: Devil Princess.

=== Autobiography and retirement ===
Mihiro published an autobiographical memoir titled nude, detailing her early life and entry into AV. The book (ISBN 4-06215449-8) was released by Kodansha on May 19, 2009. Her book is one of a number of autobiographical works by actresses about the AV industry going back to Ai Iijima's novel Platonic Sex in 2000, and including Saori Hara's My Real Name Is Mai Kato: Why I Became an AV Actress from December 2009, and Honoka's 2010 book Biography of Honoka: Mama, I Love You, which adult media reporter Rio Yasuda sees as marking a trend in which the AV industry is being assimilated into popular culture.

Also in 2009, she traveled to Korea to promote a four-part dramatic TV series Korean Classroom, a joint Korean-Japanese production which aired on Korean TV in May 2009. The series, which also starred AV Idols Sora Aoi and Rio (Tina Yuzuki), deals with three Japanese girls who travel to Korea and fall for some local men.

In 2010, in addition to her regular schedule of adult videos for S1 and Maxing, she starred in the low-budget comedy Running on Empty (ランニング・オン・エンプティ, Ranningu on enputi), released in February and directed by Dai Sakō. In May 2010, it was announced that Mihiro's autobiographical work nude would be made into a movie starring Naoko Watanabe and directed by Yuichi Onuma. The movie started shooting in May and was released on September 10, 2010.

Earlier in the year Mihiro had announced her retirement from AV and her last two videos were Mihiro Channel for Maxing and her retirement work, the 2-disc Mihiro Final - Special Technique on June 19, 2010, for S1. In 2012, the major Japanese adult video distributor DMM held a poll of its customers to choose the 100 all-time best AV actresses to celebrate the 30th anniversary of adult videos in Japan. Mihiro finished in 83rd place in the balloting.

=== Later career ===
In 2013, Mihiro starred in the Toho comedy Goddotan kiss patience Championship - The Movie, a film adaption of the popular TV Tokyo variety show. Mihiro played the part of Yurufuwa-chan in Arasa-chan Uncensored (アラサーちゃん 無修正, Arasa-chan Mushusei), the TV Tokyo comedy about a group of 30-something women starring gravure idol Mitsu Dan, which aired July–October 2014. Since 2017 she's been a member of the newly reformed Ebisu Muscats and performs regularly with the band. She also discontinued the selling of her former AV work from DMM.com by the so-called "5-year rule" (introduced around 2016), that allows AV actresses to stop the mainstream distribution of their videos five years after retirement.

== Filmography ==
=== Theatrical films ===
- Ori Nyosho Reika Shukan (檻 Prison Girl) (November 2006)
- 8000 Miles (SR サイタマノラッパー, SR: Saitama no rappā) (March 2009)
- Ju-on: White Ghost / Black Ghost (June 2009)
- Samurai Princess: Devil Princess (July 2009)
- Running on Empty (ランニング・オン・エンプティ, Ranningu on enputi) (February 2010)
- nude (September 2010)
- Goddotan kiss patience Championship - The Movie (June 2013)

=== Gravure videos ===
Release date	Video title	Company	Director	Notes
2002-05-25	Dream どりーむ	Eichi Publishing; BEV-60-21		
2004-04-25	Naked 裸体	Shuffle Believe; SFBV (VHS); SFLB-011 (DVD)		
2004-12-16	NIM Product X NIM 的製品×	FRDV-40720		
2004-12-31	Mihiro みひろ	MAX-A Pure Max; PMX-001		
2005-03-25	3165 Mihiro GO! 3165 みひろGO！	Bauhaus; BHD-611		

=== V-Cinema ===
Release date	Video title	Company	Director	Notes
2003-04-25	The Train Rape Access 6 ザ・痴漢ネット ACCESS 6	Museum Mermaid; DMMD-5599		
2003-09-22	Teacher Machi : Let's Seaside School マチコ先生 Let's 臨海学校	TMC Oscar; DOS-004		With Maiko Kazano
2004-01-22	Heisei Sekuhara Bushidou 平成セクハラ武士道	TMC Taboo7; DVTR-030	Naoyuki Tomomatsu	With Miki Asaoka, Taiki Ezawa & Yuna Aoba
2004-11-25	Chakuero no onna Karina 着エロの女 KARＩNA	Museum Mermaid; MMD-0871	Kōji Kawano	With Madoka Arai & Hiroshi Hatakeyama
2005-09-07	Swaying in the Train 揺れる電車の中で	OnlyHearts; CCDV-0054		
2006-07-28	The Inner Palace: Indecent War 大奥 淫の乱 花びら燃ゆ	Max-A Pure Max; PMX-005	Kunihiro Hasegawa	With Akiho Yoshizawa, Ayano Murasaki, Anri Mizuna, Kyōko Kazama, Nana Miyachi, Lemon Hanazawa & Shinobu Ebihara
2006-08-31	The Inner Palace: Flower of War 大奥 蕾の乱 明日への契り	Max-A Pure Max; PMX-006	Kunihiro Hasegawa	With Akiho Yoshizawa, Anri Mizuna, Kyōko Kazama, Nana Miyachi, Lemon Hanazawa, Ruri Shiratori, Satomi Shinozaki & Shinobu Ebihara
2006-11-22	Yo-Yo Sexy Girl Cop {{{1}}} Sukepan deka: Bājin nēmu = Moromie Saki	GP Museum	Daigo Udagawa	With Yuuken Yoshida, Shou Nishino & Rio Nakamura; Released in US 2008-11-11
2007-03-27	Swimsuit Spy - SPY GIRLS 水着スパイ ～SPY GIRLS～ SMizugi Supai - SPY GIRLS	Orustak Pictures	Yu Irie	With Yūri Morishita, Tomomi Obuchi, Saya Hikita, Arisa Oda & Yuri Kimura
2008-01-25	Cruel Restaurant 残酷食堂; Zankoku hanten	GP Museum	Kōji Kawano	Released in US 2008-12-02

== Photobooks ==
- Dream (夢, Yume) [Dream] (in Japanese), Eichi, August 5, 2002, ISBN 4-7542-1535-4.
- Mihiro - Mx6 (みひろ写真集 M×6) (in Japanese), Eichi, March 25, 2004, ISBN 4-7542-1574-5.
- マイウェイ出版 [Diva] (in Japanese), vol. 10, My Way, July 20, 2004, ISBN 4-86135-054-9.

== In other media ==
- Mihiro voiced Mai, a character in the 2005 videogame Yakuza
