= IdeaPocket =

Japanese Adult Video production company

- Industry: Pornography
- Predecessor: Attackers
- Founded: 2002
- Headquarters: Tokyo, Japan
- Products: Pornographic films
- Website: http://www.ideapocket.com/

IdeaPocket (アイデアポケット, Aidea Poketto) is a Japanese company located in Tokyo which is involved in the business of planning and producing adult videos. To date, the company has produced over 3,500 titles starring some of the most prominent adult video actresses.

== Company information ==
IdeaPocket split off from the Attackers corporation and was founded as a separate entity in 2002 under the umbrella of the Hokuto Corporation group of companies. It had previously been a stand-alone label used on works produced by the Attackers studio in their "Angel" series of cosplay videos to distinguish them from the more hardcore simulated rape movies produced for the Attackers Shark label. The first of the "Angel" videos, released in December 1998 and labeled AN-001, starred actress Ryo Hitomi while a later installment in the series featured AV Idol Sally Yoshino. Further labels were later added and the company now has a reputation as one of the top studios in the Japanese adult video industry combining high production values and good performances.

The company website, www.ideapocket.com, which has been online since June 19, 2002, has an audience drawn almost 79% from Japan and about 3% each from Hong Kong, the United States, and Indonesia. IdeaPocket releases about 17-18 videos per month comprising both original works and compilations and the large Japanese online video distributor DMM (part of the Hokuto Corporation) listed more than 1175 DVD and nearly 450 VHS titles available under the IdeaPocket name in mid-2010. Several of the studio's new videos have also been released in Blu-ray format. IdeaPocket released its first 3D video, 3D Mayu Nozomi (3D 希美まゆ), starring Mayu Nozomi, on September 1, 2011. In April 2013, IdeaPocket started a working relationship with professional wrestling promotion Union Pro Wrestling, which led to the introduction of the World Aipoke Championship title.

At present, the company retails most of their content via their official website and Hokutu Corporation's DMM and Fanza platforms, generating hundreds of millions in sales globally. In fact, many fans have even requested that the company incorporate subtitles as part of their videos to enhance the viewing experience.

=== Moodyz Awards ===
The IdeaPocket studio started to take part in the year-end Moodyz Awards ceremony beginning in 2004. At the 2005 gathering, the studio presented awards to some of its own personnel but in the following years, 2006 to 2008, IdeaPocket competed for awards with various other Hokuto Corporation associated companies. In 2008, the IdeaPocket video High School Girl and Sex with Rion Hatsumi won the Best Title award.

=== AV Grand Prix ===
IdeaPocket was one of the companies participating in the 2008 AV Grand Prix competition with their entry Shimiken's Private 7 FUCK (labeled AVGL-001) starring actor Ken Shimizu and actresses Chihiro Hara, Mangetsu Sakuragawa, Nene, Kaede Akina, Natsuki Sugisaki, Yua Aida and Marin. The video took the Best Miscellaneous Video award. The studio's entry for the 2009 AV Grand Prix was a multiple actress compilation GAL CIR 3, labeled AVGL-101, which was given a "Special Award - Variety Video" at the contest.

== Labels ==
Labels used by IdeaPocket and the first part of their associated product codes:

- Angel (AN for VHS tapes and AND for DVDs)
- Colors (COSD)
- High School Pink (HPD)
- Ideapocket Best (IDBD)
- Supreme (SUPD)
- Tissue (IPTD, IPZ, IPX)
- Virtual Ex

== Directors ==
Major directors at IdeaPocket include:

- Akinaga
- [Jo]Style
- Alala Kurosawa
- Takuan
- Jiro Tubuyaki
- Tadanori Usami

== Actresses ==
=== Active exclusive actresses ===
Actress Name	Debut	Birthday	Debut date
Amami Tsubasa	FIRST IMPRESSION 44	March 3, 1988 (34 years)	October 1, 2009
Airi Kijima	FIRST IMPRESSION 71	December 24, 1988 (33 years)	February 13, 2020
Kana Momonogi	FIRST IMPRESSION 89	December 24, 1996 (25 years)	October 19, 2015
Minami Aizawa	FIRST IMPRESSION 103	June 14, 1996 (26 years)	September 1, 2016
Yume Nishimiya	FIRST IMPRESSION 104	November 4, 1996 (25 years)	September 19. 2016
Tsumugi Akari	FIRST IMPRESSION 113	March 31, 1998 (24 years)	March 19, 2017
Momo Sakura	FIRST IMPRESSION 115	December 3, 1996 (25 years)	May 1, 2017
Nanami Misaki	FIRST IMPRESSION 121	June 9, 1996 (26 years)	November 1, 2017
Karen Kaede	FIRST IMPRESSION 130	August 8, 1998 (23 years)	December 13, 2018
Anna Kami	FIRST IMPRESSION 138	September 1, 1996 (25 years)	January 13, 2020
Azusa Hikari	FIRST IMPRESSION 139	November 30, 1999 (22 years)	March 13, 2020
Futaba Ema	FIRST IMPRESSION 143	August 6, 1998 (23 years)	August 13, 2020
Rio Kuriyama	FIRST IMPRESSION 144	August 1, 1998 (23 years)	October 13, 2020
Fuji Iyona	FIRST IMPRESSION 145	June 29, 1998 (23 years)	November 13, 2020
Miu Shiromine	FIRST IMPRESSION 147	February 16, 1997 (25 years)	January 13, 2021
Ono Kotomi	FIRST IMPRESSION 148	July 7, 2001 (20 years)	April 13, 2021
Kanami Mai	FIRST IMPRESSION 149	September 21, 1996(25 years)	August 13, 2021

=== Notable actresses ===
- Maeda Kaori
- Yua Aida
- Hotaru Akane
- Tsubasa Amami
- Minami Aoyama
- Azusa Ayano
- Sarasa Hara
- Akie Harada
- Rion Hatsumi
- Minori Hatsune
- Honoka
- Bunko Kanazawa
- Kaho Kasumi
- Aino Kishi
- Jessica Kizaki
- Meguru Kosaka
- Ichika Kuroki
- Miho Maeshima
- Miyu Misaki
- Nozomi Momoi
- Mina Nakano
- An Nanba
- Kaho Shibuya
- Riko Tachibana
- Akira Watase
- Sally Yoshino
- Akiho Yoshizawa
- Tina Yuzuki (Rio)
- Kana Momonogi
- Airi Kijima
- Sakura Momo
- Akari Tsumugi
- Kaede Karen
- Nanami Misaki

== Series ==
=== Popular series ===
- Digital Channel
- First IdeaPocket
- First Impression
- Kiss and Sex (接吻とSEX)
- Let's Do it at School! (学校でしようよ！)
- Love Semen
- Max Mosaic (マックスモザイク)
- Spermania
- Sweet Sex Life (甘〜い性活)
- Tempting Lesson (誘惑授業)

IdeaPocket Series
Present	Previous
DIGITAL CHANNEL	ANGEL
FIRST IMPRESSION	I made an amateur do this
FIRST IDEAPOCKET	Spermania
Kiss and Sex	Max Mosaic
Let's Do it at School!	FELLATIO Festival
Ultimate Butt Fetish Maniacs	Tempting Lesson
HIP ATTACK	Drink 100 sperms
Passionate SEX while staring at and feeling each other	Mechakawa service maid
Delivery SEX	Tutor
Sudden SEX	Virtual date
Superb Customs	Sweaty SEX
4 production	Instant kill! Bazooka facial cumshot
Climax awakening	Molester train
Pub shop where rumours can be produced	Secret female investigator
Middle-aged man favourite library girl is slowly filthy in a state where she can not move	Finest soapland
Uncle’s favourite slut girl invites middle-aged man to ejaculation	
Business trip destination shared room NTR	
Pursuit piston after cum	
Unequaled sister’s pursuit creampie cowgirl piston	
Abstinence for a month	
