= Tina Yuzuki =

Japanese actress, singer and former AV idol

- 柚木ティナ
- Born: October 29, 1986 (age 39); Tokyo, Japan
- Other names: Rio; Tina Sodeki; Tina Sodegi; Tina Kashiwagi
- Years active: 2005–2015
- Height: 1.54 m (5 ft 1 in)
- Website: blog.livedoor.jp/rio_carnival/

Tina Yuzuki (Japanese: 柚木ティナ, Hepburn: Yuzuki Tina), also known as Rio, is a Japanese actress, singer and former pornographic actress who debuted in pornography in 2005, appearing in videos produced by the Max-A and S1 studios. After starring in AVs in various genres during her first year in the industry, she won an industry award as Best New Actress for 2006. Since late 2007, she has used the stage name of Rio. In 2009, she transferred to IdeaPocket and became one of the studio's most prominent actresses. After a career that spanned over a decade and nearly 500 adult films, she retired in January 2016.

== Life and career ==
=== AV debut and Max-A (2005–07) ===
Tina Yuzuki was born in Tokyo on October 29, 1986. Her mother is Portuguese and her father is Japanese. She learned to speak Portuguese from her mother.

Yuzuki made her adult video (AV) debut at age nineteen in the November 2005 release for Max-A's Calen label, Hot Wind, The director of Yuzuki's premier video uses the name 'Toshio' and he continued to work with the actress in many of her early videos. Another collaboration between Yuzuki and director Toshio was in the March 2007 Max-A release, High School Uniform and Machine-Gun. Yuzuki continued appearing in videos for Max-A about once a month throughout 2006 and 2007. For her early work, Yuzuki was named the Best New Actress at the 2006 AV Actress Grand Prix awards.

=== Rio and S1 (2007–09) ===
In September 2007, Yuzuki announced in her official blog that she was changing her stage name from Tina Yuzuki to Rio and was starting a new blog under that name. In October 2007 Max-A released Endless Ecstasy Fuck under the name Rio. After spending two years making videos exclusively for Max-A, Yuzuki began performing for S1 No. 1 Style, part of Japan's largest porn company, the Hokuto Corporation, as early as February 2008 with the release of Risky Mosaic Rio, directed by Hideto Aki. She continued working for S1, producing one video per month, through the beginning of 2009 when she once again began performing for Max-A.

Yuzuki was given the Best Actress Award at the 2008 Adult Broadcasting Awards for appearances on the Cherry Bomb adult TV channel on SKY PerfecTV! satellite television. In addition, her November 2008 film, Double Risky Mosaic, Rio & Yuma, with Yuma Asami, was the S1 studio's entry in the 2009 AV GrandPrix contest. The video took the top GrandPrix Award and also won in several other categories: DVD Sales, Retailers Award, Package Design, and Best Featured Actress Video.

In another entertainment area, Yuzuki along with other S1 actresses was a regular on the late night TV variety show Please Muscat (おねがい マスカット, Onegai Muscat)

Yuzuki ("Rio") was a member of the Ebisu Muscats.

=== IdeaPocket and mainstream film (2009–15) ===
Rio began making videos for the AV studio IdeaPocket in March 2009 with the release of Rio's Everyday Carnival directed by Tadanori Usami.

Rio appeared in her first mainstream movie in 2009, starring in the schoolgirl prostitute revenge erotic thriller Stop the Bitch Campaign (援助交際撲滅運動), directed by Kosuke Suzuki with Kenichi Endō as the villain. The film, the third in the series, debuted at the Yubari International Fantastic Film Festival in February 2009, followed by a series of screenings in March at the Cinema Rosa in the Ikebukuro district of Tokyo. A DVD was released in June 2009.

Also in 2009, she was one of three AV Idols who appeared in the joint Japanese-Korean production Korean Classroom which was broadcast on Korean TV in May 2009. Along with her fellow stars Sora Aoi and Mihiro, she traveled to Korea to promote the four-part series. Later that year, Yuzuki starred in the comedy Kosupure tantei (コスプレ探偵) based on the manga of the same name. The film, produced by Ace-Deuce (エースデュース), was released theatrically in July 2009 and came out as a DVD the next month.

On Japanese TV, Yuzuki played the role of Lisa in the first and last (11th) episodes of the TBS comedy Unubore Deka (うぬぼれ刑事) which aired July–September 2010 and starred Tomoya Nagase, Toma Ikuta and Mika Nakashima. That same year, she played a murder victim in the TBS mystery movie Keishichō Minamidaira Han - Nana Nin No Keiji (警視庁南平班〜七人の刑事〜) which was broadcast on August 23, 2010.

In May 2011, Yuzuki performed in the drama Hard Life (ハードライフ ～紫の青春・恋と喧嘩と特攻服～, Hādo raifu: Murasaki no seishun koi to kenka to tokkōfuku), a screen adaptation of the novel by Sueko Nakamura (中村すえこ) directed by Kenji Seki. The film debuted in February 2011 at the Yubari International Fantastic Film Festival and was released theatrically in Japan in May 2011. Yuzuki starred in fashion designer RYNSHU's July 2012 film 9 3/4 (9 3／4 ナイン・スリークオーター), a love story centered on the fashion industry. American singer and RYNSHU customer Will I Am made a cameo appearance in the film. RYNSHU also invited her to appear as a model in his Spring / Summer 2013 Fashion Show in Paris.

When the major Japanese adult video distributor DMM held a poll of its customers in 2012 to choose the 100 all-time best AV actresses to celebrate the 30th anniversary of adult videos in Japan, Yuzuki finished in tenth place.

Under the name Rio, she made her debut as a solo singer in December 2013 with the combined CD + DVD music video "アイム・セクシー〜Da Ya Think I'm Sexy?〜" released by JVC.

=== Retirement from AV and other activities (2016–present) ===
After ten years of working in the AV industry, she officially announced her retirement in January 2016. and her last adult film Rio FINAL (IDBD-692) was released on 19 January 2016. Since retirement Rio has kept a mostly low profile, but also remained active on social media and was also a PTA member for the second generation Ebisu Muscats. She also held a fan meet-up event on January 12, 2019. In September, 2019 similarly to other famous ex-AV actresses like Sola Aoi and Mihiro, Yuzuki also discontinued the selling of her adult films on Fanza.

== Filmography ==
=== Theatrical films ===
- Stop the Bitch Campaign (援助交際撲滅運動) (2009)
- Kosupure tantei (コスプレ探偵) (2009)
- Hard Life (ハードライフ ～紫の青春・恋と喧嘩と特攻服～, Hādo raifu: Murasaki no seishun koi to kenka to tokkōfuku) (2011)
- 9 3/4 (9 3／4 ナイン・スリークオーター) (2012)
- Chūgakusei maruyama (中学生円山) (2013)
