= Hideto Aki =

Japanese adult video director

- Born: 1970 (age 55–56); Shizuoka Prefecture, Japan
- Occupation: Film director
- Years active: 1998 –

Hideto Aki (秋秀人, Aki Hideto) is a Japanese adult video (AV) director who has directed more than 300 movies since 1998.

== Life and career ==
Hideto Aki was born in Shizuoka Prefecture, Japan in 1970. He tells how AV Idol Hitomi Kobayashi came to his neighborhood video rental shop when he was 17 and he shook hands with her and more than 10 years later he still remembered how small and cute her hand was. He said about the event (in his 1999 "Diary"): "At the time I didn't even imagine that I would do this kind of work. Now, I can't imagine doing anything else."

Although he says he always enjoyed pink films, especially the "Four Devils" (or "Four Heavenly Kings of Pink"), he is doubtful about trying to use dramatic stories in AV. He prefers to work in the documentary style much used in Japanese porn, feeling that fiction and sex don't mix well ("If so, it is better [to] watch pink cinema"). He says he has to do it sometimes when the production side wants it or if they are using a famous actress but he describes dramatic AV as "director's masturbation".

Aki received his early training in the AV industry from Hot Entertainment and that company's founder Shungo Kaji. By late 1998, Aki was working for the Kuki studio and in a series of "Behind-the-scenes Diaries" from March to December 1999, he described his techniques and methods of working with actresses while making videos for Kuki. He also directed for the adult channel Cherry Bomb on the Japanese satellite TV network SKY Perfect. Aki continued with Kuki through 2002 when he began directing regularly for KMP. By the end of 2004 he began working with S1 No. 1 Style and since that time he has directed more than 200 videos for S1, although he has continued to work for KMP and also occasionally for Moodyz and other studios.

As part of the celebration of Shelly Fujii's three-year anniversary with KMP in November 2011, Aki directed one of the 4 sections of her video, Shelly Fujii 3rd Anniversary - 4 Performances With 4 Different Directors, along with K*WEST, Takuan & Company Matsuo.

At S1, he has directed the debut videos for that company of such AV superstars as Yua Aida, Sola Aoi, Rin Aoki, Yuma Asami, Honoka, Mihiro, Maria Ozawa, Akiho Yoshizawa and Tina Yuzuki (Rio).

== Awards ==
Moodyz Awards

- 2004 Director Award
- 2006 Best Director Award
- 2006 2nd Place Best Title Award: New Face Risky Mosaic (新人 ギリギリモザイク 麻美ゆま)
- 2006 3rd Place Best Title Award: Sell Debut x Risky Mosaic (セル初 ギリギリモザイク 穂花)
- 2007 Best Director Award
- 2007 Best Title Award: Hyper-Risky Mosaic Mihiro (ハイパーギリギリモザイク みひろ)
- 2007 2nd Place Best Title Award: Hyper-Risky Mosaic Akiho Yoshizawa (ハイパーギリギリモザイク 吉沢明歩)
- 2008 2nd Place Best Director Award
- 2008 3rd Place Best Title Award: Special Bath House Tsubaki 8 Hours (ハイパー×ギリギリモザイク 特殊浴場TSUBAKI8時間)

AV Grand Prix Awards

- 2009 Grand Prix Highest Award: Double Risky Mosaic, Rio & Yuma (Wギリモザ Rioとゆま)

(This video also won the DVD Sales Award, Retailers Award, Best Package Design and Best Featured Actress Video awards)

AV Open Awards

- 2014 Super Heavyweight Class Second Place Award: Video That Packs a Punch V - Comprehensive Angle of Tits and Ass Together Presented Before Your Very Eyes (迫力映像V 乳・尻・結合が目前に迫る徹底アングル 宇都宮しをん)

== Sources ==
- Hideto Aki at IMDb
- "Hideto Aki Filmography at Urabon Navigator". Archived from the original on 2012-03-26.
- "Hideto Aki Filmography at DMM" (in Japanese).
- "KMP Filmography" (in Japanese). Archived from the original on 2009-08-22.
- "S1 Filmography" (in Japanese).
