= An Nanba =

Japanese AV actress

- 南波杏
- Born: March 7, 1984 (age 42); Tokyo, Japan
- Height: 1.54 m (5 ft 1 in)

An Nanba (Japanese: 南波杏, Hepburn: Nanba An) also known as Ann Nanba is a former Japanese adult video (AV) actress who had a long and prolific career in the adult entertainment industry. At the beginning of 2009, the DMM and Amazon sites both listed more than 250 DVDs available under her name. She retired from AV work in 2008.

== Life and career ==
=== AV debut and Moodyz ===
An Nanba was born in Tokyo on March 7, 1984. She says she was very outgoing as a high-school student and looked much older than her age. She had met scouts from the AV industry often but only decided to begin an AV career after she was robbed and needed the money. She had done some gravure model work for Bejean a few months before and she thought she was again doing photographs for a magazine and was shocked when she realized it was a video shoot. The title of her debut video, Number.1!, released in October 2002 by Moodyz when she was 18, is a play on her name (in Japanese name order, Nanba An sounds close to English "Number One").

Her contract with Moodyz was an exclusive one and she is credited with being a driving force in that studio's success. She continued making movies with Moodyz for the rest of her career at the rate of one or often two videos per month. Although she started in AV work for the money to pay debts, she says she stayed because "I realized that my work turned into something of substance".

She also occasionally made non-AV videos - her non-sex gravure title for Shuffle, Naked / An Nanba, released in July 2003, was filmed in Okinawa. Moodyz is known for its extreme videos and Nanba participated in the various porn genres popular at the studio: bukkake (including two videos with the creator of the genre, Kazuhiko Matsumoto), anal sex, bondage, interracial sex with black actors, urination and simulated rape. The videos took their toll on Nanba, she reports that at one time she collapsed from exhaustion and had to take time off.

Nanba was the most celebrated actress at Moodyz during her long career with the studio - she was given the Best Actress Award at the Moodyz Awards three years running, in 2003, 2004 and 2005. Her 2003 videos Digital Mosaic Vol. 11 and Dream School 7 respectively won the top prize Moodyz Award and the Best Sales Award that year and her 2004 work Bukkake Nakadashi Anal Fuck was the recipient of a Special Award.

At the 2005 Adult Broadcasting Awards ceremony for adult TV programming in 2004, Nanba took one of the Channel Actress Performance Awards for her work on the Queen Bee channel,

=== Later career ===
Starting in October 2005, after more than 50 straight original videos for one company, Nanba began to appear for the first time in videos for other AV studios beginning with start-up companies Opera and Cross. She also worked with Attackers, a studio specializing in the S&M and simulated rape genres.

Nanba has been called the "Queen of Hardcore" for her many extreme videos with one director claiming “She’ll do absolutely anything” after Nanba won 11 awards at Weekly Playboy's "stupidest adult movie awards" in March 2006. Nanba has declared her dedication to her profession: "I will work my best to bring the fans the best movies".

Nanba received one of the Best Actress Awards for Excellence at the 2006 AV Actress Grand Prix.

In 2006 and 2007, Nanba also starred in a number of erotic softcore V-cinema productions. In May 2006, she was the subject of a documentary along with three other AV actresses. The DVD, under girl puraido to honne to eibui joyū (under girl プライドと本音とＡＶ女優), was directed by Kazuyuki Watanabe (ワタナベカズユキ) and published by Orustak Pictures. Nanba also appeared on TV in Episode 31 on the third series of the TV Asahi crime drama Tokumei Kakarichō Tadano Hitoshi.

Nanba was also popular in China, in part due to commercials she made for a Taiwan lemon vodka drink.

=== Retirement ===
Nanba's retirement was an elaborate and epic affair called the Ann-Project by Moodyz. She filmed a series of 8 videos for 8 different studios over a period of several weeks beginning at the end of 2007. The studios involved included S1 No. 1 Style, IdeaPocket and Animaljo, companies she had not previously worked with. The videos were released starting February 1, 2008, with the last one appropriately being a virtual sex work for Moodyz, My Eternal Girlfriend, An Nanba, released on March 1, 2008. The retirement project also included a memorial book and DVD which additionally served to introduce the new generation of actresses at Moodyz.

When the major Japanese adult video distributor DMM held a poll of its customers in 2012 to choose the 100 all-time best AV actresses to celebrate the 30th anniversary of adult videos in Japan, Nanba finished in 11th place.

=== Video games ===
Described as "Japan's geekiest adult video actress", Nanba is an ardent fan of video games and owns several game consoles - a Sony PS2, PS3 and PSP, a Microsoft Xbox 360, as well as a Nintendo Wii and DS. The Wii console was bought in New York City on launch day. Her favorite games have included Ninety-Nine Nights, Final Fantasy XII, Dragon Quest IV and Wii Fit. Nanba also has her own game blog on Beside Games, a site featuring well-known Japanese celebrities talking about the games they are playing.

Nanba's interest in video games also extended to the other side of the game console with the release on July 21, 2006 of An Nanba Cosplay Yakyuken from Gebet. This two hour UMD format PSP game and video featured Nanba in a game of "yakyuken", a version of the venerable "rock-paper-scissors" game. In this strip variant, if the player wins the round, Nanba takes off an article of clothing. This format was repeated in a December 13, 2006 entry from Gebet, All Star Yakyuken Battle which teamed up Nanba with AV Idols Akiho Yoshizawa, Kaho Kasumi, Kaede Matsushima, Mihiro Taniguchi, Ran Asakawa, Rei Amami, Sora Aoi and Yua Aida. The game and video were released for the PSP and in Blu-ray for the PS3.
