= Akiho Yoshizawa =

Japanese actress (born 1984)

- 吉沢明歩
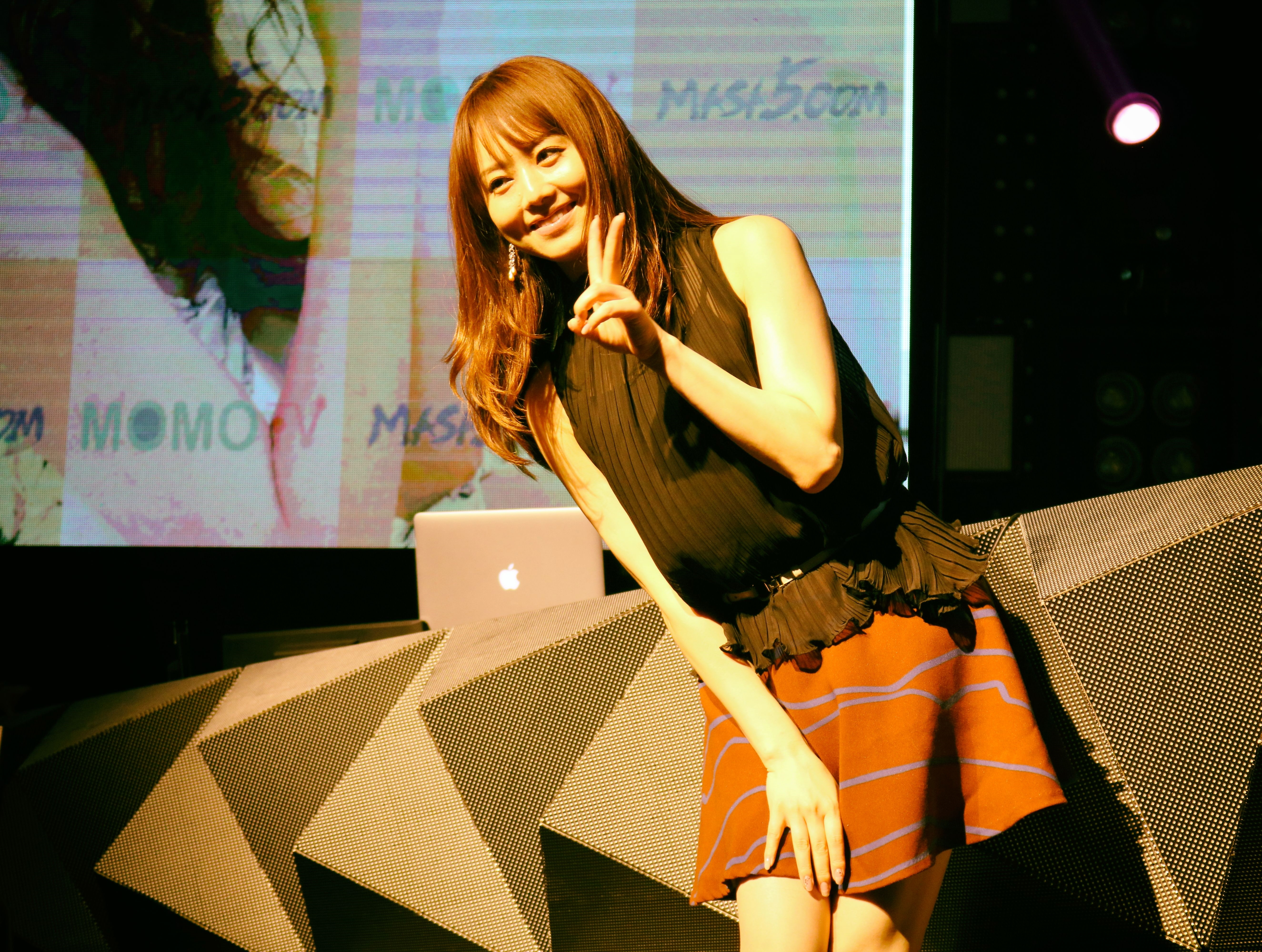
- Born: March 3, 1984 (age 42); Tokyo, Japan
- Other name: Acky
- Years active: 2003–2019

Akiho Yoshizawa (Japanese: 吉沢 明歩, Hepburn: Yoshizawa Akiho; born March 3, 1984), often known simply as Acky (あっきー), is a Japanese actress and former adult video (AV) actress, who also appeared in pink film and mainstream (non-erotic) film, as well as television. With a career spanning over more than 15 years and over 1,000 adult film appearances, Yoshizawa was widely renowned as one of the most famous and recognizable faces in Japanese adult entertainment, with an appeal that managed to cross over into mainstream entertainment.

She started her AV career in 2003 with the companies Alice Japan and Max-A, and in 2007 she transitioned to studios Maxing and S1 No. 1 Style appearing along with other famous AV actresses like Yuma Asami, Mihiro, Sola Aoi or Megu Fujiura. She was also a member of the idol group Ebisu Muscats between 2008 and 2013. Yoshizawa announced her retirement from AV in late 2018, and her final adult films were released in March 2019.

== Life and career ==
=== AV debut—Alice Japan & Max-A ===
Yoshizawa was born in Tokyo, Japan, on March 3, 1984, and made her first appearance as a gravure idol in the Kodansha company's Young Magazine (ヤングマガジン) in 2002. In February 2003 she posed for gravure photos by Hiroyuki Yoshida (吉田 裕之) released as the photobook Akiho (あきほ) (ISBN 978-4754215507). A month later, Yoshizawa made her AV debut in March 2003 under contract to two studios, Alice Japan and Max-A. Her first video as an AV performer, Angel, was released by the Alice Japan label in March 2003. Her second video 18-Teens was made for the Max-A Samansa in April 2003, and she continued alternating performances between the two studios through the middle of 2006, usually making one movie a month. Among her early videos was the July 2003 incest-themed My Sister Is an AV Idol for Alice Japan directed by sometimes-mainstream director Rokurō Mochizuki. For her work in her first year in AV, Yoshizawa was nominated for the Best New Actress Award at the 2003 X City Grand Prix Awards

=== Pink film & TV ===
In addition to her hardcore AV videos, Yoshizawa has also appeared on TV and in mainstream movies and softcore V-Cinema and pink films, including the August 2004 horror movie Koibone, which was later released as a DVD by Taki [THD-14161] in June 2005, and the December 2004 pink film Picture Book of a Beautiful Young Girl: Soaked Uniform. Yoshizawa's TV appearances include the TV Tokyo production Jōō (嬢王), which aired in 12 episodes from October to December 2005. Fellow AV Idol Sora Aoi was also in the show. Yoshizawa returned in a special guest appearance in the 2009 sequel to the show Jōō Virgin (嬢王 Virgin).

She also starred in the 2005 pink film Fascinating Young Hostess: Sexy Thighs, which was ranked as the Best Film of the year at the 2006 Pink Grand Prix. Yoshizawa won the third Best Actress award at the same ceremony for her role in the movie. In an interview, Yoshikawa said she first met the director of the movie, Tetsuya Takehora, when he directed her in a V-cinema production Erotic Fountain (エロビアの泉) for the TMC studio in 2006. She was given a Best Actress award for her work in the pink film genre at the 2006 Pinky Ribbon Awards.

Along with two other idols, Mihiro and Kaho Kasumi, Yoshizawa also ventured into another medium with the 2005 UMD format video English Cram School where the three actresses give lessons in English. The softcore video, published as GBTU-002 by Success, is for the Sony PlayStation Portable (PSP). Another PSP video and game was the December 2006 All Star Yakyuken Battle, a striptease version of "yakyuken" or "rock-paper-scissors" where Yoshizawa joined with AV actresses An Nanba, Kaho Kasumi, Kaede Matsushima, Mihiro, Ran Asakawa, Rei Amami, Sora Aoi and Yua Aida. The game and video were released for the PSP and in Blu-ray for the PS3.

In 2006 Yoshizawa starred in The Inner Palace: Indecent War, a historical costume drama set in the Edo period, released by Max-A under the DoraMax label in July 2006. In addition to the hardcore video (labeled DMX-001), the movie was also released in a shorter softcore R-15 rated version (Pure Max PMX-005). A sequel The Inner Palace: Flower of War was also released in hardcore (DoraMax DMX-002) and softcore (Pure Max PMX-006) versions.

=== Maxing & S1 ===
By the end of 2006 Yoshizawa was no longer making adult videos for Alice Japan and Max-A and began working for two new AV companies, Maxing and S1 No. 1 Style. She appeared in her first video for the new start-up studio Maxing, Sell Debut Love Acky, in that company's first set of videos released on October 16, 2006. She debuted with S1 in January 2007 with Hyper-Risky Mosaic Akiho Yoshizawa directed by Hideto Aki. She has been active with both studios since, appearing in about one movie a month for both studios.

Yoshizawa's work in AV for the 2007 year was acknowledged by several awards. One of her S1 videos, the May 2007 release Hyper Risky Mosaic - Special Bath House Tsubaki, featuring S1 stars Sora Aoi, Honoka, Yuma Asami and eight others was the studio's entry for the 2007 AV Open contest where it took the 1st Place Award. Yoshizawa also won the Best Actress Award at the 2007 Vegas Night and her S1 video Hyper-Risky Mosaic Akiho Yoshizawa took the 2nd Place Award. In another media, she was a nominee for the Best Actress Award for her 2007 appearances on adult Channel 902 (Midnight Blue) on satellite TV broadcaster SKY PerfecTV! at the 2008 Adult Broadcasting Awards ceremonies. The next year, at the December 2008 Moodyz Awards, a competition among 37 AV production companies sponsored by Japan's largest AV distributor, the Hokuto Corporation, she won the 2nd Place award for Best Actress. Her tenure at S1 also marked the beginning of her close friendship with Yuma Asami as the pair went on to co-star several films over the next few years (until Asami's retirement from AV in 2015).

=== Mainstream film and other ventures ===
In another genre, Yoshizawa played the female ninja (kunoichi) Kasumi in the erotic action V-Cinema September 2007 release Lady Ninja Kasumi Vol.4 (Kasumi: Tanjou! Sarutobi Sasuke) based on a manga by Youji Kanbayashi and Jin Hirano.

From April 2008 she was a cast regular on the late night TV Osaka variety show Please Muscat (おねがい マスカット, Onegai Muscat), which also included other S1 actresses such as Sora Aoi, Yuma Asami, Rio (Tina Yuzuki) and Mihiro singing and performing comedy skits.

She was a member of the first incarnation of the idol group Ebisu Muscats between 2008 and 2013.

In May 2008 she appeared in the mainstream science fiction comedy Shin supai gâru daisakusen, known in English as Spy Girl's Mission Cord #005, where she plays an evil alien seductress. She had a major role as Makoto in the September 2008 mainstream drama Hanky-Panky Baby about a group of young people trying to make a movie. It was also released as a DVD in November 2008. According to an interview at the time of the movie's release, part of her character's experiences in the film overlapped with some of her own life. She also said she enjoyed acting in mainstream movies and TV but thought that her AV work was also important.

Later that year, Yoshizawa starred as a woman driving a dekotora or "decorated truck" inherited from her father in the October 2008 action film Deco Truck Gal Nami. The film spawned three V-cinema sequels starring Yoshizawa and "an entire genre of 'Lady Trucker' films in Japan." An English-language version of the original film was released through Switchblade Pictures in December 2013 as Big Bad Mama-San – Dekotora 1.

In an erotic manga-based V-cinema, the November 2008 TMC release Irokoishi : Horo-hen kabuki-cho zecchotaiketsu!! (艶恋師 放浪編 歌舞伎町 絶頂対決！！), Yoshizawa plays the heroine Rie. In this third installment in the Irokoishi series (called in English Irokoishi3: Wandering—Kabukicho Ecstasy Battle!!), Rie is the victim of erotic hypnosis by the evil Ishida and is rescued by the hero Kikunosuke using his superior sexual techniques. Also in 2008, Yoshizawa starred as the title character in the V-cinema science-fiction fantasy Maid-Droid which was subsequently released theatrically by Shintōhō Eiga in January 2009. In 2010 Yoshizawa was selected to star in the inaugural episode in the "Scary Erotic Ghost Stories" (エロ怖い怪談) series of videos combining horror and eroticism.

In 2015, she starred in the Korean thriller film Maze: Secret Love.

A former highschool judo competitor herself, Yoshizawa has several ties to Japanese professional wrestling. Wrestler and mixed martial artist Alexander Otsuka has revealed himself as a fan of Yoshizawa, while All Japan Pro Wrestling held a special "Akiho Yoshizawa Cup" at an event sponsored by S1 No. 1 Style on January 22, 2010, which was won by the team of Keiji Muto, Masakatsu Funaki and S1 Mask under the management of Yoshizawa's usual coworker Megu Fujiura.

=== Later AV career, retirement and post-retirement activities ===
Yoshizawa continued making AVs and at the end of 2010, she starred in her first 3D adult video, Maxing 3D! for the Maxing studio. Adult videos in this format for the 3D televisions produced by Sony and Panasonic had first appeared in June 2010. A month later, in January 2011, she appeared in another 3D video, 3D Evolution - New Dimension, this time for S1, which had pioneered the genre.

When the major Japanese adult video distributor DMM held a poll of its customers in 2012 to choose the 100 all-time best AV actresses to celebrate the 30th anniversary of adult videos in Japan, Yoshizawa finished in third place. Yoshizawa's video for Maxing, Masochistic Lascivious Lady Akiho Yoshizawa, won the Best Program Award at the 2013 Adult Broadcasting Awards ceremony held in February 2013. On April 16, 2015, she starred in Akiho Yoshizawa × MAXING100 Work Memorial, her 100th original AV with studio Maxing, directed by Aohige Daigo, thus becoming the studio's longest working actress.

Yoshizawa continued her consistent and prolific output in the 2010s as well and by 2018 she made appearances in over 1000 adult film titles (including compilations). On October 1, 2018, Yoshizawa announced on her blog that she would retire from the AV scene in March 2019. In the same month, S1 released S1 X Idea Pocket. 2 Actresses Under Exclusive Contract Star Together In This Extravaganza! in which Yoshizawa co-starred with fellow popular AV idol Jessica Kizaki.

Yoshizawa started her last fan meet-up tour on January 12, 2019, which ended on March 31, 2019, concluding her 16-year-long AV career. Her last AV with S1, THE FINAL, Akiho Yoshizawa AV Retirement was released on March 7, 2019, a two-disk release featuring 4 hours of content and a retirement documentary on a separate DVD. Yoshizawa's final adult film AV Complete Withdrawal ~ FINAL SEX ~ Yoshizawa Akiho by studio Maxing was released on March 16, 2019. Her farewell meet-up was held on March 31, 2019.

Since her retirement from AV, Yoshizawa has been working as a special counselor at the Aria Roppongi Men's Clinic and started her own podcast Akiho 'Acky' Yoshizawa-The Radio (吉沢明歩のあっき～the Radio！), hosted by Apple Podcast. In an October 2019 interview, Yoshizawa hinted at becoming a romance novelist and on February 28, 2020, she confirmed on Twitter that she is in the process of writing her first novel, which she intends to publish in the future.

On March 28, 2020 Yoshizawa published her autobiographical novel 16 Years as an AV Actress, which details her career and her personal experiences in the adult film industry. She also started her own YouTube channel in the same year.

== Filmography ==
=== Pink film ===
- Picture Book of a Beautiful Young Girl: Soaked Uniform (December 2004)
- Fascinating Young Hostess: Sexy Thighs (December 2006)
- Temptation: Eating Me (December 2007)
- Maid-Droid (January 2009)

=== Korean film ===
- Maze: Secret Love (April 2015)

Awards and achievements
Pinky Ribbon Awards
Preceded by Yumika Hayashi	Pinky Ribbon Award for Best Actress; Akiho Yoshizawa; 2006	Succeeded by Rinako Hirasawa
