= Zombie Self-Defense Force =

- Zonbi jieitai
- Directed by: Naoyuki Tomomatsu
- Screenplay by: Naoyuki Tomomatsu; Chisato Ôgawara
- Produced by: Kenjirô Nishi; Masami Teranishi
- Starring: Miyû Watase; Mihiro; Kenji Arai; Yû Machimura; Masayuki Hase; Eriko Nagamine; Norman England
- Production companies: Filmworks Movie King; GP Museum Soft
- Distributed by: GP Museum Soft
- Release date: April 23, 2006 (Dead by Dawn)
- Running time: 75 minutes
- Country: Japan
- Language: Japanese

Zombie Self-Defense Force (ゾンビ自衛隊, Zonbi jieitai) is a 2006 Japanese zombie comedy directed by Naoyuki Tomomatsu, written by Naoyuki Tomomatsu and Masami Teranishi, and starring Miyû Watase, Mihiro, Kenji Arai, Yû Machimura, Masayuki Hase, and Norman England. Mihiro plays a spoiled pop singer who barricades herself in a hotel with several soldiers during a zombie outbreak.

== Plot ==
On a routine training exercise, soldiers from the Japan Self-Defense Forces encounter a UFO that releases strange radiation on a town. When the inhabitants turn into zombies, the soldiers and several survivors, including a spoiled pop singer, barricade themselves in a hotel and attempt to survive the assault.

== Cast ==
- Miyû Watase as Yuri Aso
- Mihiro as Hitomi
- Kenji Arai as Captain
- Yû Machimura
- Masayuki Hase
- Norman England
- Jun Yamasaki as Hayakawa

== Release ==
Zombie Self-Defense Force premiered at Dead by Dawn in Edinburgh on April 23, 2006. It was released on DVD in Japan on April 25, 2006. ADV Films released it in the United States on October 13, 2009.

== Reception ==
Rodney Perkins of Twitch Film called it an uneven splatter film made in the style of Evil Dead II and Braindead. Bill Gibron of DVD Talk rated it 3.5/5 stars and called it "a bucket full of bile topped off with a crazy comedic take on cannibalism" that is "meant to be stupid and weird and eccentric". David Johnson of DVD Verdict wrote that although it equals Braindead in gore, it is not as well-executed. Writing in The Zombie Movie Encyclopedia, academic Peter Dendle called it "a series of cheap homages and shock scenes delivered with underfunded cartoon aesthetics."
