= Tokyo Yamimushi =

Japanese manga series

- First tankōbon volume cover

東京闇虫
- Genre: Crime
- Manga
- Written by: Yūki Honda
- Published by: Hakusensha
- Magazine: Young Animal
- Original run: August 27, 2010 – January 11, 2013
- Volumes: 7
- Manga

Tokyo Yamimushi -2nd Scenario- Pandora
- Written by: Yūki Honda
- Published by: Hakusensha
- Magazine: Young Animal
- Original run: February 22, 2013 – January 22, 2016
- Volumes: 8

Tokyo Yamimushi (東京闇虫) is a Japanese manga series written and illustrated by Yūki Honda. It was serialized in Hakusensha's seinen manga magazine Young Animal from August 2010 to January 2013, with its chapters collected in seven tankōbon volumes. It was followed by a sequel, Tokyo Yamimushi -2nd Scenario- Pandora, serialized in the same magazine from February 2013 to January 2016, with its chapters collected in eight tankōbon volumes. A live-action film adaptation premiered in September 2013. A second live-action film, Tokyo Yamimushi: Pandora, premiered in April 2015.

== Media ==
=== Manga ===
Written and illustrated by Yūki Honda, Tokyo Yamimushi was serialized in Hakusensha's seinen manga magazine Young Animal from August 27, 2010, to January 11, 2013. Hakusensha collected its chapters in seven tankōbon volumes, released from March 29, 2011, to March 29, 2013.

A second part, titled Tokyo Yamimushi -2nd Scenario- Pandora (東京闇虫-2nd scenario-パンドラ), was serialized in the same magazine from February 22, 2013, to January 22, 2016. Hakusensha collected its chapters in eight tankōbon volumes, released from July 29, 2013, to March 29, 2016.

=== Live-action films ===
A live-action film adaptation premiered on September 28, 2013. A second film, Tokyo Yamimushi: Pandora (東京闇虫パンドラ), premiered on April 4, 2015.
