= Yuma Asami =

Japanese former adult video actress

- 麻美 ゆま
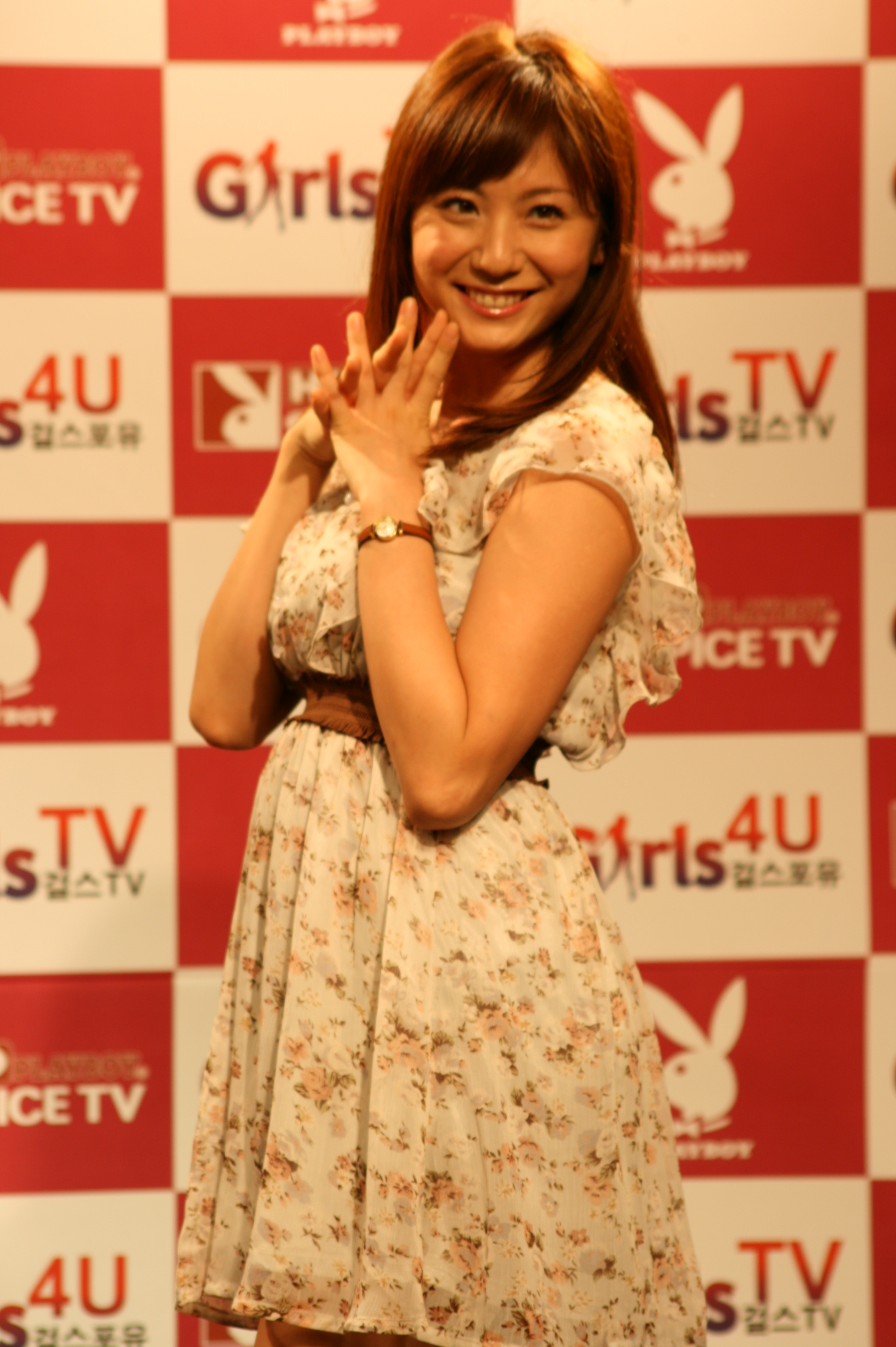
- Asami in 2009
- Born: March 24, 1987 (age 39); Takasaki, Gunma, Japan
- Height: 1.58 m (5 ft 2 in)
- Website: yumaasami.jp

Yuma Asami (Japanese: 麻美 ゆま, Hepburn: Asami Yuma; born March 24, 1987), is a Japanese actress, singer, and a former adult video (AV) actress and model. Starring in more than 600 adult films between 2005 and 2013, Asami was widely recognized as one of Japan's most famous and acclaimed adult film actresses with her popularity resulting in mainstream media appearances as well. A leading actress of two major Japanese AV studios, Alice Japan and S1 No.1 Style, Asami was known for her youthful looks, large bust, and her natural onscreen charisma which was largely credited in helping her establish herself as Japan's top adult performer. Between 2008 and 2013, she was also a member of the idol group Ebisu Muscats, where she performed with numerous other famous AV actresses like Sola Aoi, Akiho Yoshizawa, Tina Yuzuki (Rio) and Aino Kishi.

In 2013, she was diagnosed with ovarian cancer. Despite making a full recovery, Asami chose not to return to the AV industry and retired in May 2015. Currently she is an independent singer-songwriter.

== Life and career ==
=== AV career: S1 and Alice Japan (2005–2013) ===
Asami was born in Takasaki, Gunma prefecture and made her AV debut in October 2005 at the age of 18. Since the start of her career she was under contract with two large Japanese AV studios, Alice Japan and S1 No. 1 Style. and like most studio-exclusive AV actresses she made one film with each studio every month. Most of her videos with S1 have been with director Hideto Aki while her Alice Japan videos have been primarily directed by Yuji Sakamoto. Both studios specialize in the "softer" type of pornography with straight sex scenes involving a solo actress, with little or no storyline, and an avoidance of the more extreme activities of Japanese porn.

Asami quickly became one of the most popular AV actresses in Japan after her debut and she was regularly placed at the very top in DVD sales and rentals. The DMM website listing of the top 100 AV actresses by sales ranked her as number 1 in both 2006 and 2007.

Asami was involved with a number of unusual projects for Alice Japan, mostly with director KENGO. Among these are Amateur Actor Audition – Yuma Asami, released in 2007, with a plot where she supposedly interviews 10 potential AV actors between the ages of 19 and 41 and tests their abilities. On the opposite side of the coin, in the 2008 video AV Actress Audition – Yuma Asami, the storyline has her acting as the company rep interviewing and coaching 10 aspiring AV actresses. In another video from 2008 (Number One Idol Yuma Asami Produce Real Virgins) she meets specially selected "virgin" fans who are gently initiated by the actress.

Asami was recognized by AV fans for her work by winning the Grand Prix award at the 2006 AV Actress Grand Prix. In 2007 her S1 video Hyper Risky Mosaic – Special Bath House Tsubaki made with 11 other S1 actresses won the First Place Award at the 2007 AV Open competition. In addition, at the annual 2008 Adult Broadcasting Awards, a competition among adult TV channels on satellite broadcaster SKY PerfecTV!, Asami won the award for "Most Appearances" in 2007. She "wowed the crowd" by bending over several times to expose the tops of her breasts. Her November 2008 video Double Risky Mosaic, Rio & Yuma was the S1 entry in the 2009 AV GrandPrix where it won the top GrandPrix Award as well as taking the prizes for DVD Sales and Package Design, the Retailers Award, and the Best Featured Actress Video Award.

During her tenure at S1, Asami was also a part of several large-scale and acclaimed projects, like Maison Esuwan Annex, the sequel to her 2007 video, Tsubaki, or S1 TV – Showbusiness Broadcast Goes To The Extreme!, released in January 2010 and directed by Hideto Aki. With a length of nearly four hours, the film featured Asami and several other S1 actresses in an unusually detailed storyline and with a satirical outlook on Japanese television and idol culture mixed with numerous explicit sex scenes. During these years Asami also formed a partnership with fellow famous AV actress Akiho Yoshizawa. The pair had several collaborative projects during their career and remained close friends even after their retirements from the adult film industry.

In June 2010, Asami starred in one of the first two AV's made in 3D, the S1 produced Attracting The Best Stereoscopic 3D Yuma Asami Sex BODY. The release of the two videos matched the introduction of 3D televisions by Sony and Panasonic and were expected to increase sales of the TVs. When the major Japanese adult video distributor DMM held a poll of its customers in 2012 to choose the 100 all-time best AV actresses to celebrate the 30th anniversary of adult videos in Japan, Asami took second place.

While mainly working for Alice Japan and S1 throughout her AV career, Asami made occasional appearances for other studios like Attackers, Premium or E-Body.

Asami's last regular adult film Young Wife Under Aphrodisiacs Yuma Asami, by S1 was released on June 15, 2013, shortly after her announcement that she was fighting with cancer. Her last adult video appearance before her retirement was in December 2014, on the extra disc of S1's "Memorial Box Set", which detailed her recovery from the illness, and her self-discovery during a vacation on the southern islands.

=== Non-AV appearances ===
In addition to her hardcore video activities, Asami has also made several "gravure" videos, which are essentially glamour films which may include nudity but no sexual acts. She was the star of the softcore direct-to-video (V-Cinema) erotic action flick Ninja She Devil (妖艶くノ一伝 ～鍔女篇, Yoen kunoichi den tsubame hen) directed by Yoshikazu Katō. The video, released by GP Museum in October 2006, also featured AV and pink film actress Lemon Hanazawa.

Asami also worked in television, performing in the J-dorama Shimokita GLORY DAYS (下北GLORY DAYS) along with fellow S1 actresses Sora Aoi and Honoka and singer-actress Aya Sugimoto. The 12-week series aired on TV Tokyo beginning in April 2006. She played the character Komori Miha in the series which was based on the manga of the same name and revolved about a ronin student moving to Tokyo and sharing a house with several beautiful women. In 2007 she appeared in Episode 5 of the late night TV Asahi erotic drama Shinjuku swan (新宿スワン 歌舞伎町スカウトサバイバル, Shinjuku suwan kabukichou sukauto sabaibaru). Asami also had a role in the 2009 sequel to the manga-based TV Tokyo series Jōō Virgin (嬢王 Virgin). The series about kyabakura hostesses also featured AV actresses Sora Aoi, Akiho Yoshizawa and Saori Hara.

In another genre, she was also in an erotic horror pink film, Siren X (妖女伝説セイレーンＸ～魔性の誘惑～, Yojo Densetsu Seiren X – Masho no Yuwaku), directed by Hideo Jojo and co-starring Japanese AV actress Yuria Hidaka. In the movie, which premiered in Osaka April 2008, Asami is the mysterious and deadly proprietess of an inn. The film was released as a DVD in October 2008.

In October 2010, Asami starred in Shinshaku: Yojōhan fusuma no shitabari (新釈 四畳半襖の下張り), a "new interpretation" (Shinshaku) of the 1973 pink film The World of Geisha based on the novel by Kafū Nagai. The film was directed by former AV actress Kyōko Aizome and also featured Kyoko Hayami who had appeared in the 2003 cult hit The Glamorous Life of Sachiko Hanai. The film was released as a DVD in January 2011. She also starred in two more pink films for Shintōhō Eiga directed by Kyōko Aizome, the June 2011 Abe Sada: Saigo no nanokakan (阿部定 ～最後の七日間～) in the role of Sada Abe, and the December 2012 Captive Market (奴隷市, Dorei ichi) based on a novel by Oniroku Dan.

Asami played the role of Oshichi in the mainstream erotic period drama Princess Sakura: Forbidden Pleasures (桜姫, Sakura Hime). The film, directed by Hajime Hashimoto and released in June 2013, was based on the kabuki play Sakura Hime Azuma Bunsho with a modern twist.

=== Other activities ===
In 2006, Asami was featured as a Cabaret Club hostess in the PlayStation 2 videogame Yakuza 2. She debuted as a singer with the J-pop CD, Resolution, in January 2008. The CD was packaged with a bonus DVD which includes images, a making-of video and a music video.

Between 2008 and 2013, Asami was a member of the Ebisu Muscats and in 2018 she returned as a PTA member for the newly reformed, second generation Muscats, along with Rio and Sola Aoi.

She has also been active in advertising making promotional videos for the adult website Tospo.jp with the QR Code for their site covering her breasts. She also appears on a T-shirt marketed in a collaboration between Cex Work, a new company started up by photographer Yasumasa Yonehara and the apparel label The Mask. The T-shirt, released in October 2007, featured a semi-nude photo of Asami taken by Yonehara.

== Personal life ==
Asami used to work at a club in Roppongi, but later realised that she did not like working as a club hostess. She had her first sexual experience during junior high (chūgakkō), and had had five boyfriends by the time she was 18 years old. After being discharged from hospital due to cancer, she said she "didn't want to face reality and just wanted to disappear", she also became closer to her 75-year old grandmother at this point. Besides suffering from cancer, she also suffered from rheumatism.

=== Cancer, retirement from the industry, and post AV activities ===
Asami announced on June 6, 2013, that she had had surgery in February 2013 to remove an ovarian tumor and was currently undergoing treatment and chemotherapy. The tumor was discovered when Asami had an MRI scan because of stomach problems. After removing her uterus and ovaries, the doctors described the cancer as borderline malignant and classified the tumor as Stage 3 (out of 4) as to development. An update from August 2013 reported that she had undergone six chemotherapy treatments and was "on the road to recovery."

In a February 2014 interview, Asami said she wanted to continue with her music career and was writing an autobiography. The autobiographical work Re Start ~どんな時も自分を信じて~ (ISBN 978-4062185486), (the Japanese in the title translates as "Always Believe In Yourself") describing her early life and her battle with cancer, was published by Kodansha (出版社:講談社) in May 2014. She was also working with a non-profit group "Cancer Net Japan" to promote awareness of ovarian cancer.

On May 20, 2015, Asami announced her retirement from the AV industry. Since her AV retirement, she fully dedicated her career as a musician and singer, making frequent concerts and other live appearances.

== Filmography ==
=== Theatrical films ===
- Siren X (妖女伝説セイレーンＸ～魔性の誘惑～, Yojo Densetsu Seiren X – Masho no Yuwaku) (April 2008) Pink film
- Shinshaku: Yojōhan fusuma no shitabari (新釈 四畳半襖の下張り) (October 2010) Pink film
- Abe Sada: Saigo no nanokakan (阿部定 ～最後の七日間～) (June 2011) Pink film
- Captive Market (奴隷市, Dorei ichi) (December 2012) Pink film
- Phone Call to the Bar 2 (探偵はＢＡＲにいる２ ススキノ大交差点, Tantei wa bar ni iru 2: Susukino daikosaten) (May 2013)
- Princess Sakura: Forbidden Pleasures (桜姫, Sakura Hime) (June 2013)

=== Gravure videos ===
Release date	Video Title	Company & ID	Director	Notes
2006-04-21	Rabupara Yuma Asami らぶぱら 麻美ゆま	Happinet; TSVD-41045		
2006-06-25	Naked Venus Yuma Asami ネイキッドビーナス 麻美ゆま	BM.3; TJCA-10004		
2006-06-25	Ratai Yuma Asami 裸体 麻美ゆま	Happinet; SFLB-47		
2006-09-13	Kireina Sex キレイナセックス	Happinet; CON-8		
2007-03-08	Premium Honey Yuma Asami; PREMIUM HONEY 麻美ゆま	SOD; CHD-019		
2007-05-29	Juicy Honey ジューシーハニー	Happinet; JYH-1		
2007-09-06	Premium Honey Yuma Asami Second Impact; PREMIUM HONEY 麻美ゆま SECOND IMPACT	SOD; CHD-026		
2008-01-25	X Jikan (Ecstasy) 1 Yuma Asami; X時間 (エクスタシー) (1) 麻美ゆま	Happinet; GBIL-803		Includes a song
2008-06-25	X Jikan (Ecstasy) 12 Yuma Asami; X時間 (エクスタシー) (12) 麻美ゆま	Happinet; GBIL-821		Includes a song

== Sources ==
- "Official Blog" (in Japanese). Archived from the original on 2008-09-26.
- "S1 Profile & Filmography" (in Japanese). Archived from the original on 2009-04-15.
- "Alice Japan Profile & Filmography" (in Japanese).
- "AV Idol – Asami (Yuma Asami)".
- "IMDb – Yuma Asami".
- "YouTube – Yuma Asami Singing". YouTube. 19 February 2008.
