= Nana Natsume =

Japanese actress and AV idol

- 夏目ナナ
- Born: January 23, 1980 (age 46); Sakai, Osaka, Japan
- Website: http://www.nananatsume.jp/

Nana Natsume (Japanese: 夏目ナナ, Hepburn: Natsume Nana) is a Japanese film actress, a former AV idol and a well-known celebrity in Japan.

== Life and career ==
Natsume was born on January 23, 1980, in Sakai, Osaka, Japan (Her birthdate has usually been reported as 1982 and it is still listed as such on her SOD profile, but her official website has her birth year as 1980). After graduating from high school, she worked as a dental assistant and real estate saleswoman. She began her entertainment career with appearances in On Girls' File and Cure Sick Night, local late night television shows in Osaka. She was scouted for work in pornography in 2002. Moving to Tokyo, she appeared in photo features for several magazines including Shukan Gendai and Weekly Post. She was also featured in a photobook entitled 727 in July 2002 and in an "image" (non-nude) DVD called nana which was released in November 2002.

=== AV Debut & Career ===
Natsume appeared for the Soft On Demand adult video company as the host of their AV Awards ceremony at Tokyo's Shinjuku Century Hyatt hotel on November 26, 2003. Her debut video, entitled simply Debut, was released in January, 2004. Sexually conservative and inexperienced, Natsume notes of her first video, "Just how embarrassed I look during the entire thing." She says her first experiences with both paizuri and masturbation occurred during AV shoots. One of her videos, Final Pussy!, released in January 2005 is notable for its science fiction theme. Directed by Noboru Iguchi, Natsume plays a dangerous woman who is the result of a military experiment gone wrong. When she is sexually aroused, guns burst from her breasts, killing her partner. Special makeup effects were by Yoshihiro Nishimura, well known in Japanese "gore" cinema.

In November 2005, she appeared in her first bukakke movie, Nana Natsume Showered by Semen directed by Kazuhiko Matsumoto, the man who is usually credited with inventing that genre of Japanese pornography. In December 2005 she did her video Stripper, a lesbian love story with former SOD star Kurumi Morishita, directed by ex-SOD director TOHJIRO.

Natsume has received recognition several times, from the media, the AV industry, and from fans. She received the Best AV Actress prize at the Tokyo Sports 5th annual Takeshi Kitano Awards in 2004. She won multiple awards at the 2005 SOD Awards, one for Best Actress and the SOD Grand Prize for contributions to company sales and image and she also was awarded the Best Actress prize at the 2006 SOD Awards. In addition, her video Face Within Japan, Body Within a Vehicle!! was given the Best Video prize at the 2006 AV Actress Grand Prix. She also earned mention in a Mainichi Shimbun story in 2006 by starring in Dirty DVD for Girls, a pornographic video targeted for women. The newspaper described Natsume as, "one of the biggest stick flick starlets in Japan."

Natsume remained with SOD for her entire career, usually making about one video a month. Her retirement video, released in October 2007, was an 8 disk, over 16 hour package with scenes chronicling her entire body of work from her debut. Tokyo gossip newspapers had previously reported Natsume's announcement that she would retire from the porn industry at the end of October 2007.

=== TV, Radio and Movies ===
Throughout her AV career, Natsume was also a regular performer on Japanese TV and radio, including her own radio show Garnet Energy in 2005 sponsored by SOD (FM NACK5 79.5 MHz). In 2007, she was a DJ on her FM Chisato radio show Nana Natsume's Sparkling Moonbow (夏目ナナのキラキラ☆moonbow) in Osaka. She was also one of the SOD girls on the TV Osaka variety show NeoHappy in 2006 and its successor DIVA in 2007. She also had a small role in the TV Asahi comedy-drama The Aaah Detective Agency (Aatantei jimusho - ああ探偵事務所) which ran for 11 weeks from July to September 2004.

Since her retirement from the AV industry, Natsume has continued her work in mainstream media. She was a regular Thursday reporter on the NTV (Japan) information variety show Johnny Word of Mouth (くちコミジョニー) from December, 2007 until the show ended in March 2008. She also had a featured role playing Rumi Osaki in the TV Tokyo cosplay ghost story Guren Onna (ぐれんオンナ) broadcast in 12 episodes from January 11 to March 28, 2008. In 2009 she had a guest role in Episode 2 of the TV Tokyo series Uramiya honpo reboot (怨み屋本舗ＲＥＢＯＯＴ) which ran from July to September 2009.

Natsume starred in the low-budget action-horror film Yoroi Samurai Zombie which debuted in 2008 at the South Korean Puchon International Fantastic Film Festival and was subsequently released theatrically in Japan in February 2009. The film was directed by Tak Sakaguchi and co-produced by SOD. She also plays a vicious gang boss in the 2008 movie Sasori directed by Joe Ma. This Hong Kong-Japanese production is a remake of the classic 1972 Japanese exploitation film Female Convict 701: Scorpion and according to one review "Nana Natsume ... steals every scene she’s in". In the August 2010 film King Game (KING GAME キングゲーム, Kingu gemu), directed by Tatsuya Egawa, Natsume played the role of Yoshitsune, one of ten people trapped in a room for a game of Truth or Dare.

=== Other Activities ===
As a singer, Natsume covered the 1982 J-pop hit Sekido Komachi Dokit! (赤道小町ドキッ!) in a CD single and DVD music video released August 2, 2006, by Rock Chipper Records.

Natsume was the voice of a character in the Sega video game Ryu Ga Gotoku 2 (龍が如く2) or Yakuza 2 for PlayStation 2 released on December 7, 2006. Her role as a nightclub hostess in the game was minor but she played a large part in publicity for the game. She was also engaged to publicize the August 2008 Nintendo DS supernatural ghost story game You Mustn't Look (Mitewa Ikenai - みてはいけない) from video game producer Dimple. Part of the campaign was a comic photo series and video at the offices of game reporters Famitsu.

In October 2007 she was featured in the popular culture magazine, Spa!. In her article, in which she gave advice to men seeking success in the area of romance, she stressed the virtues of good grooming and personal hygiene to her reading audience. Also in late 2007, Natsume was able to fulfill a long-time wish by opening a "Healing Salon" (ヒーリングサロン) called TORICO in Osaka which uses aromatic massage oils to heal and relieve fatigue.

As part of a campaign against sexually transmitted disease (STD) in Japan called "STOP! STD" sponsored by AV studio Soft On Demand, Natsume was featured in a large billboard in Tokyo in 2008.

There are Nana Natsume-themed apartments available in the Nishi-ku area of Osaka. A large picture of her is above the bed and there are more pictures of her in the kitchen and bathroom as well as an "Edogawa Rampo voyeur beam" in the hallway. The monthly rent is 149,000 yen for a 2-bedroom unit and 480,000 yen for a 3-bedroom suite.

== Photobooks ==
- 727 Nana Natsume Photos (727ナツナナ―夏目ナナ写真集) — [Bauhaus] — July 2002 (ISBN 4894619040)
- Nana Merica — [Media Kreis] — August 2005 (ISBN 477880029X)
- Nana Natsume Complete (夏目ナナ complete) — [MC Press] — October 2005 (ISBN 4901972367)
- Nana Natsume Rainbow Book (夏目ナナのレインボーブック) — [Media Factory] — March 2006 (ISBN 4840114927)
- Nanavira — [Tokyo MMP] — April 2006 (ISBN 4903454002)

== Sources ==
- "SOD Profile & Filmography" (in Japanese). www.sodc.co.jp. Archived from the original on 2012-11-13.
- "Nana Natsume". AV Idol Directory.
- "夏目 ナナ - Natsume Nana (Profile)". Web I-dic (in Japanese).
- "Nana Natsume Interview". Translated by Woo, Ex-S. www.jmate.com. 2003-11-27.
- "Nana Natsume (Profile)". Urabon Navigator 1997-2006. Archived from the original on 2011-06-22.
- "夏目ナナ、大阪弁キャバ嬢役ゲーム声優 Nana Natsume: Game-dubbing voice artist in Osaka-dialect" (in Japanese). nikkansports.com. 2006-10-23. Archived from the original on 2007-10-13.
- "夏目ナナが学ぶ！ AVとゲーム業界の意外な共通点とは？" [Nana Natsume Learns! The AV and Game Industries Have Something Unexpected in Common?] (in Japanese). news.ameba.jp. 2008-04-18. Archived from the original on 2008-05-01.
