= Yua Aida =

Japanese model and AV idol

- あいだゆあ
- Born: 12 August 1984; Toyohashi, Aichi Prefecture, Japan
- Years active: 2003–2007

Yua Aida (Japanese: あいだゆあ, Hepburn: Aida Yua; born 12 August 1984) is a former Japanese model and AV idol.

== Life and career ==
=== Early life ===
Yua Aida was born in Aichi Prefecture, Japan, on 12 August 1984. Aida was an active girl and involved in many sporting activities during primary and middle school. Tennis was her strongest sport throughout middle school. In high school, she changed her focus from sports to art, an interest she attributes to her mother. Aida has said that exposure to nude models while oil painting helped her to be more comfortable when she began her adult videos (AV) career. After her graduation from high school, Aida began a part-time job. At this time she was scouted by an AV talent agency while shopping in Tokyo's Shinjuku neighborhood. Aida says that she was not impressed with the talent scout, but when she met the company president, she thought, "This guy is really great. I’m gonna work here!"

=== AV career ===
Yua Aida debuted in photo layouts in 2003, and made her AV debut in the January 2004 DVD release Pichi Pichi for Max-A. The video was directed by Yukihiko Shimamura with whom Aida made several more videos in the following years. Aida's second video, Your Yua Aida, was released in February 2004 by the KUKI studio. This video left the fictional narrative format to explore the documentary style common with Japanese adult videos. Over the next year, Aida made new videos about once a month, alternating between Max-A and KUKI. At the 2004 X City Grand Prix Awards, Aida received the Best New Actress Award as well as the 3rd Place Best Actress Award.

In Spring 2005, Aida joined a new studio, S1 No. 1 Style, and released her first video with them, Sell Debut, directed by Hideto Aki, in May 2005. She also acted alternately with Style Art studio, formerly named Moodyz studio. She became one of the most popular figures at the S1 studio – in the DMM list of the top 100 actresses by sales, she placed No. 1 in 2005 and No. 4 in 2006. While at S1, Aida won the Best Actress Award for Excellence at the 2006 AV Actress Grand Prix. In addition, on 20 March 2006 at the 2006 Adult Broadcasting Awards, she received the Best Actress Award for programs broadcast in 2005. Aida remained with S1 for the rest of her AV career, appearing in about one original video a month. In March 2007 she appeared in one of the "Digital Channel" series of videos for Idea Pocket and later, in mid-2007, she also starred in four videos in the Moodyz Diva series.

On 12 July 2007, Aida announced in her blog that she was retiring from appearances in AV, but planned to continue appearing in gravure and non-pornographic "Image" videos. The November 2007 gravure video Eternal, The Last DVD was announced as her final retirement work. Later in November Style Art entered her video Yua Aida Dance Best (containing dance scenes from her earlier Style Art videos) in the 2008 AV Grand Prix contest. On 16 February 2008, Shinyusha published a final photobook Yua with photographs by Miseki Liu.

In 2012 the major Japanese adult video distributor DMM held a poll of its customers to choose the 100 all-time best AV actresses to celebrate the 30th anniversary of adult videos in Japan. Aida placed number fifteen in the final count.

== Personal life ==
Aida's sister is Towa Aino, a gravure idol.

== Sources ==
- "Aida (Yua Aida)". AV Idol Directory.
- Aida, Yua. "Yua Aida – Stark Naked Interview". sexasian18.com. Archived from the original on 14 July 2007.
- "あいだ ゆあ – Aida Yua" (in Japanese). 'Web I-dic' (Idol Dictionary). Archived from the original on 6 October 2007.
