= S1 No. 1 Style =

Japanese adult videos producer

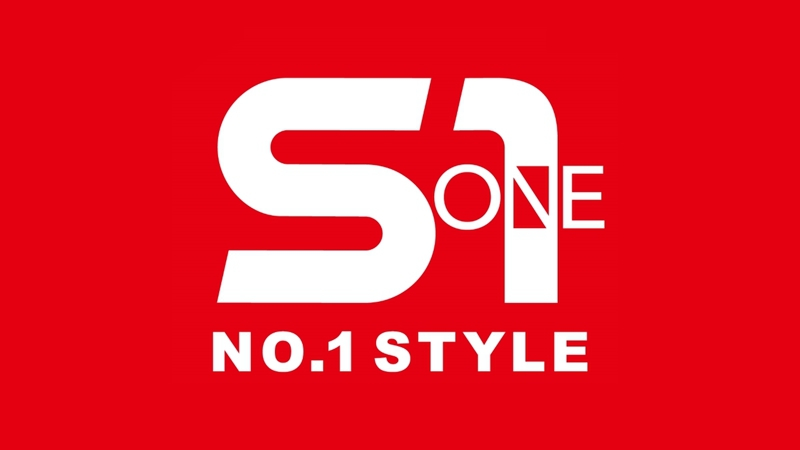
- Industry: Pornography
- Founded: 2004
- Headquarters: Meguro, Tokyo, Japan
- Products: Pornographic films
- Parent: Hokuto Corporation
- Website: s1s1s1.com

S1 No. 1 Style (エスワン ナンバーワンスタイル) or just S1 (エスワン) is a Japanese producer of adult videos (AV) which has its offices in Tokyo's Meguro Ward. The company is best known for retailing its adult videos under the Fanza brand, an affiliate of DMM.

In the past 21 years since its inception, S1 has risen to become one of the most prominent movie studios in the Japanese adult entertainment scene, producing over 5,100 movies to date.

== Company Information ==
S1 is one of the many affiliated companies in the giant Hokuto Corporation group. Hokuto distributes the studio's videos via retail sales and online through its DMM website under the Fanza brand. The Public Relations representative for the studio is Megumi Yamane (山根愛美).

The studio's website, s1s1s1.com, has been online since June 30, 2004 and their first videos were released in November 2004 starring AV Idols Sora Aoi and Alice Ogura along with the simultaneous debut of eight new actresses: MEW, Mami Hayasaki, Kaya Yonekura, Chihiro Hara, Kanan Kawai, Akane Mochida, Rin Hino and Misato Shiraishi. All Japanese adult videos are censored by applying a mosaic over the genital areas but in late 2004, S1 was the first company to replace the old analog mosaics with a new thinner digital mosaic they named "girigiri" or risky mosaic (ギリギリモザイク, girigirimozaiku).

In celebration of its 5th anniversary, S1 organized a special puroresu event with All Japan Pro Wrestling, which was held on January 22, 2010 at Korakuen Hall. The main bout of the event, named the Akiho Yoshizawa Cup after the popular idol of the studio, featured several prominent wrestlers such as Keiji Mutoh, Masakatsu Funaki, TARU, and Ryota Hama.

S1 began producing videos in Blu-ray format as early as September 2009 with The Raped Female Teacher 2 starring Akiho Yoshizawa. By late 2011, the S1 catalog of Blu-ray releases numbered 53 videos. S1 became the first Japanese AV studio to produce works in 3D format in June 2010. The first, 3D x Mika Kayama, starring Mika Kayama, was released on June 7 and the second, 3D x Yuma Asami, starring Yuma Asami, came out on June 19. Shooting in 3D was a new experience for the studio and required actors to move more slowly and new lighting arrangements. Production took three months, about three times longer than the usual AV. The release of the 3D videos coincided with the introduction of 3D televisions by Sony and Panasonic and the titles were expected to boost sales of the new TVs. S1 and other AV studios were also looking for a way to increase lagging sales and intended to produce several more 3D titles for 2010.

=== Videos and codes ===
S1 released its first 11 videos on November 11, 2004 labeled with the production codes ONED-001 to ONED-011. The company continued using the ONED series of production codes, releasing as many as 30-40 videos per month, until ONED-999 appeared on June 19, 2008 when it switched to a new code series starting with SOE-001. Compilation videos which re-mix previously released material use production codes of the type starting with ONSD-001. In addition, S1 videos intended "for rental only" carry different codes. Original videos are labeled 5ONE-xxx or 5SOE-xxx and compilation videos follow the scheme 5ONS-xxx, where the "xxx" portion corresponds to the 3 digits of the same "for sale" videos.

=== Popularity and awards ===
In the 2006 and 2007 AV Open contests based on video sales, the S1 entry took the First Place Award in both years. The S1 nominated video in the 2008 AV Grand Prix (based on sales and fan votes), won the GrandPrix Stage Highest Award and also the award for Best Package Design as well as the Press Award and the Dealer Award. At the 2007 Vegas Night awards, the S1 video Hyper-Risky Mosaic Mihiro won for Best Title and the top 4 places in the Best Actress category were taken by S1 actresses with Akiho Yoshizawa taking 1st Place. The studio also dominated the 2009 AV GrandPrix Awards winning the top GrandPrix Award in addition to taking the DVD Sales Award, the Retailers Award, Best Package Design Award, and the Best Featured Actress Video Award for Double Risky Mosaic, Rio & Yuma.

One of the industry's most popular AV actresses, Yua Mikami, joined S1 in 2016, after being part of the idol girl group SKE48. Other notable actresses under the S1 label include Sora Aoi, Tsukasa Aoi, Yu Shinoda, and Eimi Fukada among others. Mikami's addition to S1 not only skyrocketed S1's popularity in the Japanese market, but also attracted many viewers from outside Japan where a large number of them have even produced subtitles for their movies.

In October 2022, one of the most popular international pornography websites R18.com announced that it will be shutting down operations permanently effective 1 January 2023. The site was owned by parent company Hokutu Corporation, which is also the company behind the S1 production brand.
