= Hokuto Corporation =

Japanese adult entertainment company

- Industry: Pornography
- Founded: 1990; 36 years ago
- Headquarters: Ebisu, Tokyo, Japan
- Products: Pornographic films
- Number of employees: 185
- Subsidiaries: CineMagic Co., Dogma studio, Moodyz, S1 No. 1 Style

Hokuto Corporation (株式会社北都, Kabushiki Kaisha Hokuto), is a Japanese joint stock company involved in the distribution of adult videos (AV) and adult toys. The firm, founded in March 1990, is headquartered in Tokyo at the Ebisu Garden Place Tower. By late 2008, DMM was handling products from more than 150 different adult video studios, making it one of the largest AV distributors in Japan. The company interfaces with the public for sales and information as Outvision.

== Company information ==
As of July 2007, Hokuto Corporation had 185 employees and total assets of 16,618,000,000 yen (about $166 million). Stockholders' equity was 6,073,000,000 yen (about $60 million) and company capital amounted to 45 million yen (about $450,000). Sales for the fiscal year ending February 2007 were 28,366,000,000 yen (about $283 million) with sales for the 2008 fiscal year extrapolating to about 30 billion yen (about $300 million). Hokuto Corporation had a period of rapid growth from the time of its foundation with sales going from 5.1 billion yen (about $50 million) in the fiscal year 2001 to 6.2 billion yen ($60 million) in 2002, 9.8 billion yen ($100 million) in 2003 and 12.3 billion yen ($125 million) in 2004. Under CEO Hiroyuki Shimazaki (島崎啓之), Hokuto Corporation caught up with and surpassed its chief rival in AV sales, the Soft On Demand (SOD) group. Some companies which had formerly been part of SOD, including Dogma, Hajime-Kikaku and Aroma Planning, left SOD to become clients of Hokuto Corporation.

According to the Japanese market research company Teikoku Databank, after this period of rapid growth, there was a sharp drop in sales at Hokuto Corporation, probably due to competition from internet porn sites. From a high of 32.4 billion yen (about $330 million) for the fiscal year 2008, income dropped to less than half that amount for the 2010 fiscal year and rival SOD once again became the largest adult conglomerate in Japan.

=== DMM ===
The DMM Corporation (株式会社デジタルメディアマート or "Digital Media Mart"), incorporated November 1999, is a major distributor of videos in Japan for both sales and rental, and also provides pay-per-view and downloadable digital adult content via its website dmm.co.jp. The director of DMM is Tatsuya Matsue (松栄立也) and the company has a capital of ¥30 million (about $300,000). The DMM website was opened in July 1998 and in September 2011 was ranked #30 in traffic for Japanese sites, #177 in Hong Kong, and #422 globally, with an audience slanted towards middle-aged men.

As of September 2011, DMM had a catalog of more than 160,000 DVDs for sale, more than 200,000 adult videos available for rental and more than 130,000 videos for digital download. It also lists information on more than 30,000 AV actresses and compiles an annual list of the top 100 ranked actresses in sales from its site. In addition, the DMM site provides facilities for a large number of AV actress blogs. DMM also provided an English-language version, en.dmm.co.jp, for pay-per-view or monthly subscription downloads only, but it was discontinued on 29 April 2013.

==== Nutaku partnership ====
In December 2014, DMM partnered with Nutaku with the objective of marketing and publishing games to the western market. Nutaku is currently the sole distributor of DMM games outside Japan.

Several DMM games have been translated in English and released on Nutaku:

- Angelic Saga
- Dragon Providence
- Dragon Tactics Memories
- Duel Squad
- Girls Kingdom
- Hellfire Girls
- Hijitsu Chronicle
- Kanpani Girls
- Lord of Valkyrie
- Luv Slot
- Millennium War Aigis
- Peropero Seduction
- Ultra Adventure! Go Go-Osawari Island

For additional information see Nutaku#Game release timeline.

=== R18.com ===
In May 2013, DMM.com released its English-language adult website R18.com, which grew to become the largest English library of Japanese adult videos on the Internet. With over 200,000 movies available for VOD via streaming and downloading. On October 24, 2022, the site ended selling content, and announced that it would close down (except for enquiries from customers with R18 member accounts) on January 31, 2023. From January 31, 2023, customers with R18 member accounts were no longer able to access videos that they had already "purchased", and the site was shut down completely, as previously announced that it would be, on May 12, 2023.

=== AV Grand Prix ===
Upon the demise of the SOD-sponsored AV Open contest in 2007 owing to fraud, DMM started a new competition in 2008, the AV Grand Prix. Winners were determined by sales and by fan voting at the DMM website. The 2008 AV Grand Prix was a success with 77 studios competing and an even larger 2009 contest began in late 2008.

=== Companies in the DMM group ===
As of mid-2010, the DMM group included 20 studios producing gravure (non-nude) videos and another 19 units involved in adult toys. More than 150 companies were in the business of producing adult videos in various formats and genres. Below is a list of some of the main companies involved in AV production.

- A-BOX
- ABC (Art Body Collection)—"big-bust" models
- Animalijo
- Anna and Hanako (アンナと花子)—specializes in lesbian videos
- Arashi-Supergirl (嵐を呼ぶスーパーガール)
- Aroma Planning (アロマ企画)—specializes in more extreme "maniac" videos
- Art Video (アートビデオSM)—features S&M and bondage videos
- Attackers (アタッカーズ)—known for simulated rape and S&M material
- Aurora Project Annex (オーロラプロジェクト アネックス)
- AV Refugees (AV難民)
- AVS
- BeFree
- Beauty
- BI (美)
- bibian (ビビアン)—specializes in lesbian videos
- Bravo
- CineMagic (シネマジック)—specializes in S&M and bondage
- consent (コンセント)
- Cross (クロス)
- DAS (ダスッ！)—produces simulated rape and humiliation videos, some videos featuring shemale models
- Digital Ark (デジタルアーク)
- Dogma (ドグマ)—specializes in various extreme fetishes
- E-BODY
- EDGE (エッジ)
- Emmanuelle (エマニエル)—mature women
- EROS HEARTS
- Euro Star
- F&C (エフアンドシー)—anime
- FA Pro (FAプロ)
- Goemon (五右衛門)
- Goro Tameike (溜池ゴロー)—mature women videos
- graphis (グラフィス)
- Hayabusa Agency (隼エージェンシー)
- Hajime-Kikaku (はじめ企画)
- Hekireki (エロイプキング)
- Himawari Kikaku (ひまわり企画)
- Hyakka Bijin (百花美人)
- IdeaPocket (アイデアポケット)
- Inflagranti Japan (インフラグランティ)—specializes in S&M fetish movies
- Kakkoii! (カッコイイ！)
- Karma (カルマ)
- kawaii
- kichu
- Kira☆Kira
- Kitagawa Production (北川プロ)—videos portraying S&M and FemDom
- M's Video Group (エムズビデオグループ)—specializes in bukkake and gokkun material
- Madonna (マドンナ)—specializes in "mature" women
- MARIA—mature housewife videos
- Marx Brothers (マルクス兄弟)
- Men's Heaven
- Milkyprin (みるきぃぷりん♪)—known for "big-bust" models
- Miman (未満)
- Moccori Television (もっこりテレビ)
- Momotaro (桃太郎映像出版)—comprises a group of independent producers
- Moodyz
- Mousouzoku (妄想族)—specializes in "big-bust" models
- Muku (無垢)—produces videos with "schoolgirl" models
- Munekyunkissa (胸キュン喫茶)
- Muteki
- OPPAI—featuring "big-bust" models
- Opera (オペラ)—specializes in scat fetish videos
- Otsuka-Floppy (大塚フロッピー)—specializes in scat fetish videos
- Platina (プラチナ)
- Premium (プレミアム)—specializes in stylish glamour videos
- Ran-Maru (乱丸)
- RED (レッド)
- ROOKIE—produces featured actress videos
- RYUGUJYO (竜宮城)—amateur actress videos
- S1 No. 1 Style (エスワン ナンバーワンスタイル)—glamorous AV Idols
- SexiA (セクシア)
- Shinoda Project (しのだ)
- Style Art (スタイルアート)
- Suppin (すっぴん)—amateur actresses
- Tokyo Special (東京スペシャル)
- Toyohiko Project (豊彦)
- U&K—specializes in lesbian videos
- V (ヴィ)
- VENUS—mature women videos
- Yellow Movie (イエロー)
- ZONE

== Sources ==
- "Outvision" (in Japanese). Outvision Website.
- "DMM Adult" (in Japanese). DMM Website.
