= K*West =

Japanese pornographic film director

K*WEST
- Born: Japan
- Occupation: Film director
- Years active: 2002–
- Website: http://blog.livedoor.jp/cb_k_west

K*West or K*WEST is a Japanese adult video (AV) director who had directed more than 150 DVD productions as of September 2011.

== Life and career ==
K*WEST, along with several other directors, including Alala Kurosawa, [Jo]Style and KINGDOM, got his start at the Waap Entertainment AV studio. During his tenure at Waap, he has directed over 125 DVDs going back to at least October 2002 with the video Ass Pet Girl in the Class (クラスで人気の尻ペット 森町ここみ). Many of his videos for Waap have been on the company's Cobra label. K*WEST has also directed for other AV studios, including Dogma and occasionally Moodyz

In 2006, K*WEST was one of 11 directors invited to compete in the second Dogma D-1 Climax Awards. The resulting videos were released by Dogma on September 16, 2006. His entry for the contest was Ad Lib Triple Live (アドリブ痴女トリプルライブ!!!) (labeled D1-201) starring Sarina, Riri Kōda & Aira. K*WEST was once again selected for the Dogma D-1 Climax Awards contest in 2007 with 13 other directors. His entry for the 2007 competition, released on September 15, 2007, was Sadistic Labyrinth (陵辱の迷宮 黒人・小便・ドロ責めレイプ 松野ゆい) (labeled D1-310), an interracial bondage and simulated rape video starring Yui Matsuno.

Also in 2007, K*WEST was chosen by Waap Entertainment to direct their nominated video for the AV Open contest, Deep Lesbian & Hot Semen & Black Fuck (熱吻ブラック), starring Marin and Shiho. The interracial-themed video, released in May 2007 as OPEN-0717, won the Lily Franky Honorary President Prize.

K*WEST also was one of the directors (with Goemon) of Waap Entertainment's entry in the 2008 AV Grand Prix, the four-hour long Shall We Fuck x10 (現役東●生の挿入十番勝負とギリギリモザイク), AVGP-042, starring Lemon Tachibana.

As part of the celebration of Shelly Fujii's three-year anniversary with KMP in November 2011, K*WEST directed one of the 4 sections of her video, Shelly Fujii 3rd Anniversary - 4 Performances With 4 Different Directors, along with Hideto Aki, Takuan & Company Matsuo.

During his career, K*WEST has worked with many AV Idols, including Sakura Sakurada, Riko Tachibana, Hotaru Akane, Riri Kōda, Kurumi Morishita, Maki Tomoda, Chihiro Hara, Yuka Osawa / Elly Akira, Hikari Hino, Nao Ayukawa, Maria Ozawa & Rio Hamasaki.

== Bibliography ==
- "Official Website".
- "Urabon Navigator K*WEST Filmography". Archived from the original on 2012-08-12.
- "DMM K*WEST Filmography".
