= Cross (studio) =

Japanese pornographic film studio

- Industry: Pornography
- Founded: 2005
- Founder: Matsushima Cross
- Defunct: 2008
- Headquarters: Ebisu, Tokyo, Japan
- Products: Pornographic films

Cross (クロス, Kurosu) was a Japanese adult video (AV) studio located in Tokyo at the Ebisu Garden Place Tower.

== Company information ==
Cross was founded by directors Matsushima Cross (松嶋クロス) and Innjean Koga (インジャン古河) in late 2005, the event being announced at a press conference at a club in Tokyo's Shinjuku district on October 19, 2005. Cross had previously been a director for AV studios Kuki, Max-A and Try-Heart Corporation while Koga had formerly directed for V&R Planning. The studio's first videos, labeled with the production codes CRPD-001 to CRPD-010, were released on November 19, 2005, and included AV Idols An Nanba and Riko Tachibana among the actresses. Matsushima Cross announced his retirement from AV and left the company in June 2007.

As of October 2011, the studio had released about 450 original and compilation videos, an average of about six to seven videos per month since the studio's origin in 2005. Cross compilation videos which use scenes from previous original Cross videos use production codes of the form CRAD-xxx with CRAD-048 coming out in October 2011. Cross distributes its videos for DVD sales and online viewing through the Hokuto Corporation via their DMM website. Yamada Kensuke (山田 健介) is listed as the Manager of Operations for the company.

== Directors ==
In addition to Matsushima Cross, a number of directors, past and present, have also made videos with Cross. The most prominent among them has been Dragon Nishikawa who had directed over 200 videos or nearly half of all Cross productions by late 2011.

- Zack Arai (ザック荒井)
- Captain Ehara (キャプテン江原)
- Kikurin (菊淋)
- Innjean Koga (インジャン古河)
- Dragon Nishikawa (ドラゴン西川)
- Pinky Osanai (ピンキー小山内)

- Sakura Sakurada (桜田さくら)
- Tiger Sakei (タイガー小堺)
- Tatsuhito Suzuki (鈴木達仁)
- Tomoyasu Takei (武井寅泰)
- Shinosuke Takinogawa (滝野川進之助)

== Actresses ==
Among the various prominent AV Idols who have performed in Cross videos, probably the one most closely associated with the company has been Sakura Sakurada who has appeared in 29 Cross videos. Sakurada first starred for Cross in Invincibility Molester released in March 2006 and has continued acting for the studio through 2010. She also made her debut as a director in the Cross video The Maniac Lesbians' Filming Party from March 2008. She directed a second movie for Cross, Big Bust New Faces Lesbian Interview, in August 2008.

Other actresses appearing for Cross include:

- Hotaru Akane
- Hikari Hino
- MEW

- An Nanba
- Reira Aisaki (Chihiro Hara)
- Riko Tachibana
- Maki Tomoda

== AV Open ==
Cross entered the 2007 AV Open contest in the Challenge division for directors. Cross took the First Place Award with the entry from director Captain Ehara, Anal Splash Thick Lesbian United! (肛門潮吹き極太合体レズビアン), starring Chihiro Hara, Hotaru Akane & Sakura Sakurada, labeled OPEN-0755 for the contest and later released as CRPD-209. The video also won the Lily Franky Honorary President Prize at the AV Open

Cross also had entries in the AV Grand Prix contests which succeeded the AV Open:

- 2008: Boy Fresh Face Cock Coastline Story (少年ロリータおちんぽ海岸物語) AVGL-013 starring Yu Aine, Hikaru Hozuki & Hina Morino, and directed by Dragon Nishikawa.
- 2009: The Secret Bad Company - Anal Transformation Horror Ranger (悪の秘密ケツ社一ノ屁のぞみ対肛門変態ホラレンジャー) AVGL-122 starring Nozomi Ichinohe, Yuuka Tsubasa, Azusa Itoh, Karen Ichinose, Ryo Harunaga, Shiho Mizusaki, Aika & Miyuki Majima, and directed by Dragon Nishikawa.

== Campakex ==
Campakex was an indie rock band started by Matsushima Cross and Innjean Koga in 2004. The group released the CD Level of Campakex through Komatsu Records on June 9, 2006 and Dear Call Girl on July 11, 2007, through the same company. They also performed at the Erotic Rock Festival in Shibuya, Tokyo in May 2007 with several AV actresses in attendance. The group was dissolved in June 2007.
