= (Jo)Style =

Japanese adult video director

[Jo]Style
- Born: Japan
- Occupation: Film director
- Years active: about 2002–

[Jo]Style is a Japanese adult video (AV) director who has supervised more than 300 productions during his career.

== Life and career ==
[Jo]Style began his profession directing AV at the Waap Entertainment studio which also fostered the careers of Alala Kurosawa, KINGDOM and K*WEST. At Waap, he continued the bukkake-themed Dream Shower series which had been initiated by Kurosawa in 1998, starting with Volume 37 in January 2002. He also became well known for directing two other series at Waap, "Semen by Female Teacher" (ザーメンby女教師) and "The Condominium of the Big Breast Wife" (巨乳マンション).

When the new studio, S1 No. 1 Style, was founded in November 2004, [Jo]Style directed Akane Mochida in her debut video New Face, one of the first set of eleven videos released by the company on November 11, 2004. He continued directing at S1, compiling a record of more than 75 videos for the studio by late 2011.

[Jo]Style was one of 14 directors invited to compete in the 3rd D-1 Climax Awards competition sponsored by the Dogma studio in 2007. His entry was the S&M video Egoistic Love - Blind Woman's Desire To Be Humiliated (Egoistic Love 被虐願望、美しき盲目の女) (D1-309) co-starring Azusa Ito and Nana Saeki. He had also directed a number of videos for Moodyz over the years and at the 2008 Moodyz Awards ceremony, he received the 4th Place Award for Best Director. For the 2008 AV Grand Prix competition he directed the 3-hour video MADONNA BOOTCAMP ELITE [AVGL-025], the nominated entry of the Madonna studio.

Over the course of his career, [Jo]Style has directed a number of notable AV Idols including Akiho Yoshizawa, Kaede Matsushima, Maria Ozawa, Mihiro, Rio, An Nanba, Hotaru Akane, Yuma Asami, Riko Tachibana, Sora Aoi and Nao Oikawa.

== Sources ==
- "(Jo)Style - Profile & Filmography at Urabon Navigator". Archived from the original on 2011-03-14.
- "(Jo)Style - Filmography at DMM" (in Japanese).
