= Maxing =

Japanese pornographic film company

MAXING
- Industry: Pornography
- Founded: 2006
- Headquarters: Shibuya, Tokyo, Japan
- Products: Pornographic films
- Website: http://www.maxing.jp

MAXING (マキシング, Makishingu) is a Japanese adult video (AV) studio and production company located in the Shibuya ward of Tokyo.

== Company information ==
Maxing is an independent adult video firm which specializes in videos for sale rather than rental. The Maxing studio was founded in 2006 and released its first set of videos on October 16, 2006. An early coup for the company was the signing of AV Idol Akiho Yoshizawa who had become available in October 2006. Her first video, Sell Debut Love Acky was one of the premiere set of Maxing videos offered in October 2006. Another success was bringing back Naho Ozawa from retirement and her first video with Maxing, Naho Ozawa Encore, was also part of the October 2006 releases.

The company releases about 15 new videos per month and by September 2011, DMM, the video sales and distribution arm of the Hokuto Corporation, listed nearly 700 DVD titles under the Maxing name. In addition to DVD products, by April 2008 the company also began producing videos on Blu-ray discs and in August 2010, Maxing came out with their first videos in 3D format for the new 3D televisions, closely following the lead of S1 No. 1 Style which had released the Japanese adult industry's first 3D products in June 2010.

At the 2010 Adult Broadcasting Awards for adult material broadcast over the SKY PerfecTV! satellite network, the Maxing production Yuzuka Kinoshita – New Face (新人 木下柚花舞い降りた巨乳天使) starring Yuzuka Kinoshita won the Best Program Award from among the more than 10,000 programs aired that year.

Maxing operates its own website, www.maxing.jp, which has a viewership 80% derived from Japan, although it is also popular in Hong Kong and Vietnam.

== Labels ==
In addition to the Maxing label, the studio has also released videos under several other labels:

- Bodyva
- Cool Sexy
- Jukebox
- MAXING 3D
- Natural Beauty
- Pretty Cute
- Roppongi

== Actresses ==
A number of prominent AV actresses have performed in Maxing videos:

- Elly Akira
- Hikari Hino
- Kaho Kasumi
- Minako Konno
- Miho Maeshima
- Mihiro
- Nao Oikawa
- Ai Sayama
- Tsubomi
- Akiho Yoshizawa
- Maria Yumeno

== Series ==
Video series produced by Maxing include:

- Fu-Zoku Channel (風俗ちゃんねる)

== AV Open / AV Grand Prix ==
Maxing was one of the 19 companies which sent entries to the 2007 AV Open competition. The nominated video was Ai Tokito - Active Performer AV Debut - Who Are You (現役バリバリの芸能人に芸名を付けさせAVデビューさせちゃいました。 新人 時東あい), labeled OPEN-0713 and starring Ai Tokitou. Maxing was also one of the 39 studios which entered the GrandPrix Stage of the 2008 AV Grand Prix contest. Their entry was Real AV Doll Ami Sakurai (リアルAVドール 桜井あみ) (AVGP-032) starring Ami Sakurai.
