= Kaoru Adachi =

Japanese film director, producer and editor

- Born: Susumu Saegusa; January 27, 1956 (age 70); Tokyo, Japan
- Occupations: Film director Film producer
- Years active: 1986–present

Kaoru Adachi (安達かおる, Adachi Kaoru; born January 27, 1956) is a Japanese film director, producer and editor, and founder of the Japanese documentary and adult video (AV) studio V&R Planning.

== Life and career ==
Kaoru Adachi was born Susumu Saegusa (三枝 進, Saegusa Susumu) in Tokyo. He initially worked in the TV industry mainly as an import agent for foreign films and is credited by former associate Company Matsuo with introducing Monty Python to Japan.

=== V&R Planning ===
In April 1986, Adachi founded the film studio V&R Planning in Tokyo. The V&R stands for "Visual and Retail". According to Matsuo, Adachi didn't know how to shoot films but was interested in "weird documentaries", especially those involving death, so he just "shot documentaries the way he thought they should be."

V&R Planning, under the Mad Video label, distributed the Japanese versions of the first three videos in the US Faces of Death series as Janku or Junk. Around 1989, Adachi along with Company Matsuo and a cameraman traveled to Brazil to film death scenes for Shin janku ("New Junk"), known in the US as Faces of Death 4, for which Adachi received co-director credit. Dark Side magazine noted his involvement with this series in an article "A Death Dealer - Susumu Saegusa" in issue #124 for December/January 2007. He also did a further series of death videos called "Death File" (デスファイル) again under the Mad Video label.

In another vein, Adachi produced and edited Katsuyuki Hirano's award-winning 1999 film Shiro - The White, a documentary of a solo bike ride to northern Hokkaido during a blizzard.

=== AV director ===
Adachi directed a number of videos with AV Idol Yumika Hayashi at V&R Planning from as early as 1990 in his "Jesus Christ Superstar Special" (ジーザス栗と栗鼠スーパースタースペシャル) series. He also directed another AV series titled "Black Jesus Christ Superstar" (ブラックジーザス栗と栗鼠スーパースター).

In addition to straight actress features, Adachi was also involved in directing a number of extreme fetish movies including bestiality in the July 1987 Immoral Animal in Wonderland (男と女のアニマルゲーム), urolagnia in the 2004 works Urination Class Sakura Sakurada (排尿教室 桜田さくら) and Urination Class Reiko Mizuno (排尿教室 水野礼子) and scatology in Grotesque Entertainment - Super Mad Scatology (ゲロテスク・エンターテイメント スーパー大喰糞) released in 1997 for the V&R Planning Purge label.

=== Uncensored videos ===
Uncensored videos, those without the mosaic pixelation to obscure the genitals which is necessary for all Japanese porn, are sold and licensed to international distributors via the V&R Planning subsidiary V&R International with headquarters in Brazil. Adachi has directed a number of these uncensored videos including the "Woman Teacher in Black" series which were uncensored versions of his "Urination Class" series, the "House of Gomorrah" series and the "Domination High" series. From 2007, he also directed several uncensored videos from the scatology fetish series made under the VXR label for V&R International. Among his later works for V&R International is the June 2008 release A Fuckwork Orange: Return of Lasses in Hell (XV-065) which combines lesbian domination and humiliation, urination, and cockroaches and maggots.

== Sources ==
- "Official Blog" (in Japanese). www2.vandr.co.jp.
- * "Susumu Saegusa". IMdB.
- Dirty Bob (July 2003). "Aqua Sex (review)". Adult Video News.
- Milton, Bradley (December 2003). "Night Nurses Gone Wild (review)". Adult Video News.
- Horwitz, Jerome (March 2004). "Aqua Sex 2 (review)". Adult Video News.
- Rutter, Jared (April 2005). "Woman Teacher in Black Sakura (review)". Adult Video News.
- Star, Marc (September 2005). "Woman Teacher in Black (review)". Adult Video News.
- Norhinf, Guy (January 2007). "Domination High (review)". Adult Video News.
- Dirty Bob (June 2007). "House of Gomorrah? And God Created Anal (review)". Adult Video News.
- Dirty Bob (June 2007). "Pussies On Patrol (review)". Adult Video News.
