= Momoi =

Momoi (written: 桃井 lit. "peach well") is a Japanese surname. Notable people with the surname include:

- Haruko Momoi (桃井 はるこ) (born 1977), Japanese voice actress and singer-songwriter
- Kaori Momoi (桃井 かおり) (born 1951), Japanese actress
- Nozomi Momoi (桃井 望) (1978–2002), Japanese AV idol
