= Point-of-view pornography =

Style of pornography

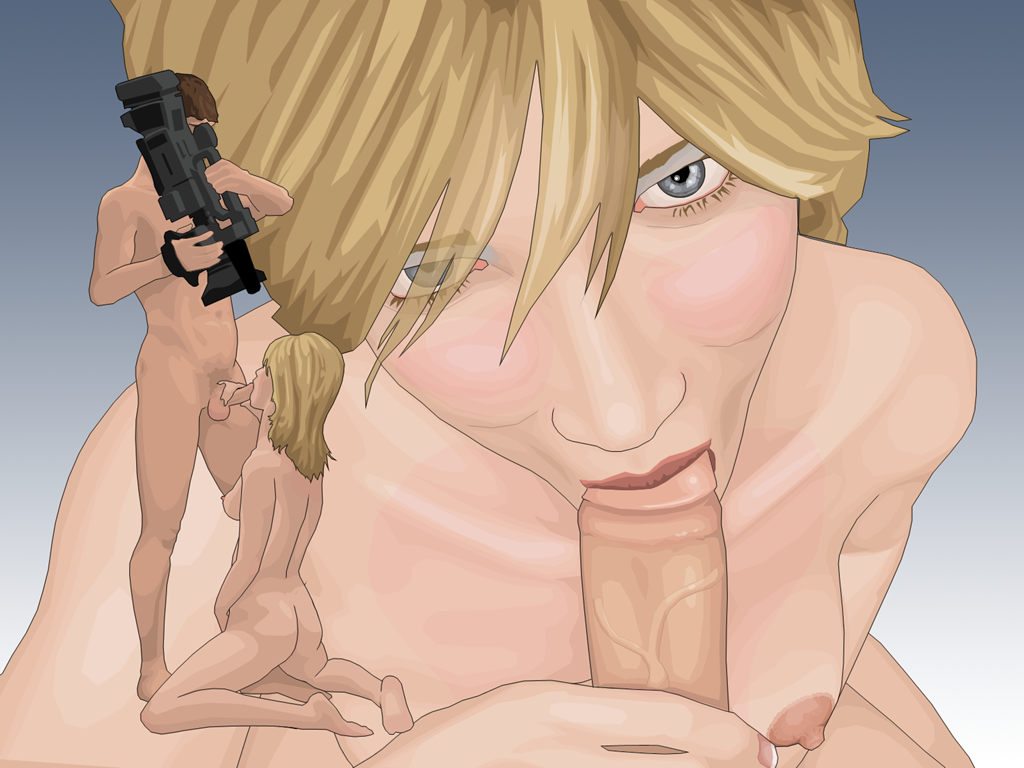
POV pornography: one of the performers (left) films the sexual act, which results in a point-of-view shot (background).

Point-of-view pornography, also known as POV pornography, is adult entertainment filmed to look as if the watcher were experiencing the sex act themselves. In POV pornography, the shooting style is generally a person receiving sexual gratification holding the camera themselves—aiming it down at the actor who is performing the sex act. This style of filming is in contrast to having a separate, third-person camera crew filming all the action. The effect is to give the viewer the sense that they are experiencing the porn acts that they are watching, as opposed to simply watching others as a voyeur.

== Filmography ==
POV pornography sometimes breaks the strict point-of-view convention. For instance, Amateur Allure has a trademark shot where the sexually performing cameraman circles a handycam around the sexually performing model's head. This yields a view that would not be obtainable directly through the eyes of a person while experiencing the sex act. There is, however, no third-party camera work involved.

== POV pornography in Japan ==
In Japan, point-of-view pornography is referred to as hamedori (ハメ撮り). Hamedori is a genre of Japanese pornography in which a male adult video (AV) actor or director serves as the camera operator. Hamedori-type videos were produced from the beginnings of Japanese AV in the early 1980s. The term "hamedori" came into use about 1988–1989, but it was only a small niche area until it was popularized at V&R Planning by director Company Matsuo.

Matsuo started working in the genre in 1991, saying that this intimate technique was a natural way for him to shoot in order to show his feelings for the woman and to "get her to open up about herself, to show her true emotions". Matsuo used amateur actresses in his videos, and he usually traveled to their hometowns for the filming. He talked to them extensively on camera so that both he and the viewer can come to know them before any sex scenes. A large part of the popularity of these videos is seeing how normal the women are in real life. As amateurs in a single segment of a multi-part video, the actresses are typically paid about ¥50,000 (around US$500).

== Awards and recognition ==
The X-Rated Critics Organization has had a "Best POV Release" award (2005–2009) and a "Best POV Series" (since 2010) in their annual XRCO awards. The AVN Awards have "Best POV Series", "Best POV Release" and "Best POV Sex Scene" awards.

Vice.com noted the prominence of POV pornography and its popularity among both men and women and consumers of virtual reality porn.

A 2022 study by Swansea University analyzed the effects of virtual reality porn and noted that prior research had studied the effects of women-centered erotica, including pornography filmed from a woman's point of view.

== See also ==
- Gonzo pornography – Pornography that places the viewer directly at the scene
- Point-of-view shot – Type of photography or filmmaking shot
- Reality pornography – Candid portrayals of sexuality for the exclusive purpose of arousal
- Virtual reality pornography – Porn that's meant to be viewed through a VR headset
