= Mino Suzume =

Japanese AV idol

- 美乃すずめ
- Born: 10 May 1996 (age 30); Hyogo, Japan
- Occupations: AV idol; model; actress
- Years active: 2019–present
- Height: 168 cm (5 ft 6 in)

Mino Suzume (Japanese: 美乃すずめ) is a Japanese gravure idol and AV Idol. She made her debut in the gravure of "Weekly Post" and she dominated the No. 1 sales ranking of photo books (monthly, weekly, daily). She signed a long-term large-scale contract with FALENO, an AV maker exclusively distributed by U-NEXT, and made her AV debut.

== Career ==
In August 2019, she made her nude gravure debut in the August 16 and 23, 2019 issues of Weekly Post and the gravure series “Nanon". She made her nude gravure debut as “Kobe no Onna Mino (Kobe Woman Mino)”. According to “NEWS POST SEVEN,” she reportedly received a flood of inquiries after being listed as a mysterious woman with unknown details.
