= Katsuyuki Hirano =

Japanese pornographic film director

- Born: 1964 (age 61–62); Shizuoka Prefecture, Japan
- Occupation: Film director
- Years active: 1989–
- Spouse: Honey Hirano

Katsuyuki Hirano (平野勝之, Hirano Katsuyuki) is a Japanese director of adult videos (AV) and documentaries. He should be differentiated from the manga artist Katsuyuki Hirano (平野克幸).

== Life and career ==
Hirano was born in 1964 in Shizuoka Prefecture, Japan and was an aspiring cartoonist until he began making amateur films from the time he was 18. Three of his early films were selected to play at the Japanese PIA independent film festival in 1985–1987. He appeared as an actor in the 1986 Cinderella story film Hai Kaburi (Princess Story) (はいかぶり姫物語) directed by Hisashi Saitō (斎藤久志). In January 1989 Raigyo (雷魚) was released, an 8 mm color film written, directed and photographed by Hirano. The film assured his reputation as an independent film maker and won a Jury Prize at the 1990 Image Forum Festival (イメージフォーラム・フェスティバル).

Hirano started directing in the adult video (AV) industry in the early 1990s with several videos for V&R Planning. At the V&R studio he met AV actress Yumika Hayashi who had had a love affair with another V&R Planning director, Company Matsuo. Hirano, although married, also had an affair with Hayashi and starred with her in a bike-trip AV production in January 1997 called Tokyo - Rebun 41-day Adultery Bicycle Touring Trip. He later released a mainstream documentary of their trip in May 1997 as Yumika (由美香). Both the video and the movie were produced by V&R Planning. The trip to the northern Japanese Rebun Island in Hokkaidō was made in July 1996 with the knowledge of Hirano's wife Honey (who appears in the movie) and Hayashi's mother. The rigors of the long trip proved to be a strain on his relationship with Hayashi. Hirano also directed AVs for the Alice Japan studio in the 1990s, several of them with AV Idol Yuri Komuro, including her farewell to the AV industry Last Scene in September 1999.

The second of Hirano's trilogy of bike-ride documentary movies, Encyclopedia of a Drifter (流れ者図鑑, Nagaremono zukan), was released in May 1998 and co-starred Tomoko Matsunashi. A hardcore version was also released by V&R Planning in July 1998.

The last entry in the trilogy came out in December 1999 as Shiro - The White (白 THE WHITE) starring Hirano, 9 dogs, 3 cats, and a wild fox. In this film, Hirano embarks on a solo bike trip of over 2300 km to the northernmost point of Japan in Hokkaidō during a winter blizzard, sleeping in a tent in temperatures as low as 20 below zero. Hirano, who the Japan Times reviewer describes as having the "look and attitude of a middle-aged class clown who never quite outgrew his early obsession with peeking up girls' knickers", films himself alone in his tent having imaginary conversations with a female companion. A few weeks into his trek he developed appendicitis and had to spend two weeks in a hospital. His wife Honey Hirano (平野ハニー, Hirano Hanii) came up from Tokyo to nurse him but once recovered he set out again alone into the biggest snowstorm in years filming himself struggling against the elements. The film won the NETPAC Award at the 1999 Yamagata International Documentary Film Festival and was shown at the 24th Hong Kong film festival in 2000 and at the 2000 Berlin International Film Festival.

Hirano was singled out as one of the subjects of a study in the year 2000 by the Anti-Pornography-&-Prostitution Research Group of Japan (APP) where "violent porno videos" made by "popular porno video directors such as Baksheesh Yamashita and Katsuyuki Hirano" were analyzed and reported on.

Hirano returned to film scenes of winter and snow in Hokkaidō for a 2003 hardcore video for Kuki, Nasty Girls Go to the North, with AV actress Fubuki Aoi. In May 2006, Hirano also directed the Dream Ticket studio's entry in the 2006 AV Open contest, Mrs. Abnormal Nymphomania with an amateur cast of "mature women".

It was Hirano who, after his former lover Yumika Hayashi had not been to work for a few days, went to her apartment along with Hayashi's mother and found her dead body on July 29, 2005. Hayashi had died after a night of heavy drinking to celebrate her 35th birthday. He appeared in a 2009 documentary on Hayashi by director Tetsuaki Matsue titled Annyeong Yumika (あんにょん由美香, Annyon Yumika) along with other former colleagues Company Matsuo and Lemon Hanazawa.
