= Maria Yumeno =

Japanese pornographic actress

- 夢野まりあ
- Born: August 17, 1978 (age 48); Tokyo, Japan
- Website: http://ameblo.jp/maria-yumeno/

Maria Yumeno (Japanese: 夢野まりあ, Hepburn: Yumeno Maria) is a Japanese pink film, adult video (AV) actress and gravure model. In 2003, she was called one of Japan's highest-earning AV performers and "probably its most famous." Many of her movies emphasized her large bust and thin body.

== Life and career ==
Maria Yumeno was born in Tokyo, Japan on August 17, 1978, according to her standard profiles but an interview published in 2003 declares that the "24-year-old from Tokyo is in fact a 30-year-old from Yamaguchi." Yumeno comes from a broken family, as her father left when she was a child. After leaving school, she worked for a time as a graphic designer.

=== AV debut ===
As with many other AV actresses, Yumeno was found by a scout in Tokyo's Shibuya district where the penniless Yumeno accepted an offer of a "modelling audition" to make money. She made her debut in adult videos in late 1998 with the h.m.p. release The Wild Bust. Soon afterwards she appeared in a nude pictorial set for the Japanese men's magazine Bejean.

Yumeno made several more videos in 1999 with h.m.p. and at the 1999 Tokyo Sports Film Awards, she was given the Best AV Actress Award. She went on to work with a number of other major AV studios of that period including Crystal-Eizou, CineMagic, V&R Planning, Kuki, Atlas21 and Alice Japan including making the S&M themed Masochistic Room Service for Kuki in March 2000. She also starred in some early S&M and bondage works for Attackers.

Yumeno appeared in the erotic science fiction film I.K.U., released in Japan in May, 2001, in the role of Reiko number 2. The movie had previously premiered at the Sundance Film Festival in January 2000. In October 2002, Yumeno starred in the pink film Maria Yumeno: Chō-inran onna no shiseikatsu (夢野まりあ 超・淫乱女の私性活) directed and written by Daisuke Yamanouchi and released by Xces Film.

For a long time, there has been a connection between AV and the Japaneses wrestling community and on November 4, 2002, Yumeno made her pro wrestling debut participating in a Women's Erotic Wrestling (WEW) match in Yokohama. In April and May 2003, she also took part in live action hardcore erotic wrestling matches for Adult Video Wrestling (AVW) with the losers having sex with the referees and others. Also participating were AV actors Taka Kato and Chocoball Mukai (a former professional wrestler). A six-hour video, AVW Fuck Down!, was released in June 2003.

=== Retirement and comeback ===
Yumeno's interview published in September 2003 states that she had retired from the adult video industry a few months earlier. However, she continued acting in mainstream films including the October 2003 horror film The Naked and the Living Dead (新怪談残虐非道・女刑事と裸体解剖鬼, Shin kaidan zangyaku hidō: onna keiji to ratai kaibōki) where she played a zombie maid. Yumeno also had a role in the manga-based live action film version of Devilman (デビルマン, Debiruman) released in October 2004. In a voice role, Yumeno played the lead character, Rina, in the adult anime OVA Dark Tours / Shinjin Tour Conductor (新人ツアーコンダクター) which came out in Japan in October 2004. Dark Tours was released in the United States in August 2006 with English subtitles and/or dubbing.

In 2005, Yumeno appeared with fellow AV actresses Hitomi Hayasaka, Naho Ozawa and Ran Monbu as well as AV actor Chocoball Mukai in the erotic comedy film Ecstasy Express (シベリア超特急・欲望列車, Shiberia Chōtokkyū: yokubō ressha), which had its debut at the Yubari International Fantastic Film Festival in February 2005 and was later shown theatrically in Tokyo in August 2005. The film, starring gravure idol Miku Matsumoto, was subsequently released on DVD.

Yumeno was back performing in adult videos in December 2005 with Super Bust Female Doctor for "mature woman" specialist studio Madonna, followed by further mature videos, Voluptuous Mature Nakadashi for Glory Quest in 2006 and Bewitching Lady for Maxing Stargate in 2007. It can be noted that in Yumeno's profile from 2004, her bust measurement is listed as 93 cm (37 in.) but as of 2008 according to her official website, her bust was 115 cm (45 in.).

Yumeno had a role in the June 2008 theatrical drama Dekotora no shu: Hinokuni kumamoto (デコトラの鷲（しゅう） 其の五 火の国熊本親子特急便) directed by Hideyuki Katsuki. The film, fifth in the "Dekotora no shu" series, starred Show Aikawa and also featured pink film actress Junko Miyashita and former AV actress Honoka. She has continued to appear in occasional adult videos for the Madonna studio and "mature woman" specialist Goro Tameike and also works as a media personality or "tarento" (タレント).

== Partial filmography ==
Video title	Release date	Studio	Director	Notes
The Wild Bust ワイルド爆乳	1998-10-31	h.m.p. Jamm; JJT-001	Kin Ishikawa	AV Debut
The Drill Fucker ドリル・ファッカー！	1998-12-25	h.m.p. Jamm; JJT-004
The Lecherous Bitch したがる女	1999-01-21	h.m.p. Jamm; JJC-001
The Busty Slave 乳奴隷	1999-02-25	h.m.p. Jamm; JJC-003	Tatsuya Touma
Targeted Female Teacher 2 ねらわれた女教師２	1999-03-24	h.m.p. Miss Christine; CMC-006	Midori Moriguchi
Aphrodisiac Breast 乳欲獣	1999-04-27	h.m.p. Samm; CSV-007	Masahiro Kasai
Love Doll Maria 愛Ｄｏｌｌまりあ	1999-05-13	Crystal-Eizou Venus; VE-72	Kei Shiraha
Dynamite Tits A GoGo! 爆乳 Ａ ＧＯ ＧＯ！	1999-05-22	h.m.p. Jamm; JJC-009		With Erika Himemiya, Satomi Fujii & Satomi Ohara
Abnormal Privacy: Slave Secretary 27; Abnormal Privacy 奴隷秘書27	1999-08-20	CineMagic; VS-570	Shinichi Kawamura
Bondage Doll Maria Yumeno; BONDAGE DOLL 夢野まりあ	1999-09-17 (VHS); 2000-07-28 (DVD)	CineMagic; VS-574 (VHS); DD-017 (DVD)	Shinichi Kawamura
Pussy Cat 牝猫	1999-10-25	HRC Cher; HRC-327	Pusuke Yamada
The Neighbor's Sister Has G-Cup となりのお姉さんはＧカップ	1999-11-21	Big Morkal; SBM-48	Sun Matsui
G.B.O - Great Bakunyu Oh! My God!	1999-12-15	V&R Planning Vogue; VO-198	Eigo Mochizuki
New Female Teacher Special 新・女教師スペシャル	2000-01-18	V&R Planning Vogue; VO-200	TOHJIRO
Trap - Greedy Web 罠 〜Ｇｒｅｅｄｙ ｗｅｂ〜	2000-02-29	HRC Cher; HRC-337	Pusuke Yamada
Masochistic Room Service; Mルームサービス	2000-03-23	Kuki Vinl; JF-592	Hideto Aki
Home Delivery Soapland 宅配ソープでございます	2000-04-29	Atlas21 Saurs; S-00045	Sun Matsui
Slave Secretary Special 7 奴隷秘書スペシャル７	2000-02-29	CineMagic; VS-607		Compilation with Naomi Hoshi, Riona Sakamaki & Yoko Yazawa
Give Up Human Being (Inhumanity) 人間廃業	2000-06-30	Alice Japan Babylon; KR-9128	Kunihiro Hasegawa
How To Perfect 徹底攻略	2000-10-01	Wanz Factory; HP-101
Slut Actress 22 痴女優 22	2000-10-06	Waap Entertainment Kohshiro; CHD-022	Koushirou
Boobs Shake! パイ地震！！	2000-10-18	Kuki Vinl; JF-628	Toru Daikanyama	With Erika Himemiya, Fuka Sakurai, Kaori Shimizu, Mami Kawai & Mayu Kotono
Deep Complex ディープコンプレックス	2000-11-18	Waap Entertainment Gone; GOD-018	Tokumitsu
Home Delivery Call Girl Premium III 宅配ソープでございます	2000-11-24	Atlas21; AVD-043		Compilation with Riona Sakamaki, Run Takano & Yurika Satomi
KUKI Best Collection Vol.6	2000-12-01	Kuki; KDV-128		Compilation with Nana Sakura, Minami Asaoka, Rin Tomosaki & Aya Yoshii
Financial Corruption Dirty Bank 金融腐敗 淫獣銀行	2000-12-06 (VHS); 2001-05-16 (DVD)	Attackers Super Special; SSP-002 (VHS); DSP-002 (DVD)		With Yuki Tsukamoto & Mio Okazaki
The Pretty Slut Wife Rape 妖艶妻レイプ ゴージャスな昼下り	2001-01-12	Attackers Shark; SHK-127 (VHS)
Give Up Human Being File Vol.4 (Inhumanity File Vol. 4) 人間廃業ファイル VOL.4	2001-03-16	Alice Japan Babylon; KR-9143		Compilation with Bunko Kanazawa, Fuka Sakurai, Maika Sawada & Sayaka Hijiri
Love Toy Training 18 Dragon Bondage Series 龍縛愛玩調教18 コスプレイヤー	2001-08-09	Attackers Ryubaku; RB-018 (VHS)
The Contrary Soap Heaven (Bubbly Heaven) 逆ソープ天国	2001-11-30	Alice Japan Babylon; KR-9169	Shigeo Katsuyama	Compilation with Ami Ayukawa, Hina Uemura, Uruka Kitamura & Yoko Takashima
Rape Drama Babe Series Vol. 7 レイプドラマBABEシリーズ 第7巻	2002-05-17	SOD; SDDL-149		With Ryoko Izawa
The Contrary Soap Heaven Special 6 逆ソープ天国貸切スペシャル 6	2002-06-14	Alice Japan Babylon; KR-9159	Kanda Usagi
Super Angle of Oppai Maria Yumeno 超-巨乳のアングル 夢野まりあ	2002-12-01	Wanz Factory; SO-104
Tokyo Diva Special Edition: Maria's Playhouse	2003-03-20	A6		Uncensored
Lesbian Debut Vol. 1 れずDebut VOL.1	2003-06-06	Natural High; RDMD-001		With Reina Kondo & Azumi Tsukino
AVW Fuck Down!	2003-06-25	Obtain Future; AWF-001		With seven other actresses
Maria Yumeno Complete 夢野まりあ 完全版	2003-10-01	Wanz Factory; WX-111
Super Bust Female Doctor 爆乳女医	2005-12-25	Madonna; JUKD-322
Tip Top X 3P Club	2006-01-20	Tip Top; TAD-3301		Uncensored; With Mirai Hirooka, Yui Sarina & Yui Okuda
Voluptuous Mature Nakadashi 艶熟 中出し	2006-04-01	Glory Quest TopazJ; TUJD-30
Bewitching Lady 妖艶淑女	2007-03-16	Maxing Catherine; SGCRS-011
We Love Busty Girls!! Boyoyon!!	2007-06-15	Fairy; FMX-004		Uncensored; Compilation with several other actresses
Big Tits Beauty : Special Collection	2008-04-22	FantaDream; FDD-2052		Uncensored; Compilation with several other actresses
Hot Fact What She Does To Fulfill Her Quota! ノルマ達成の為なら肉体営業も辞さないトップセールスレディの実態	2008-06-16	Maxing Catherine; SGCRS-026		With Reiko Shimura
Glamorous Maria Yumeno; GLAMOUROUS 夢野まりあ	2008-12-19	Real Works; REAL-342w
Beautiful Wife Midafternoon Humiliation 美人妻 乳辱の昼下がり	2010-09-07	Attackers Ryubaku; RBD-213	Meo Sakamoto	With Reiko Nakamori
Shameful Door-to-door Milk Sales 乳辱の訪問販売 夢野まりあ	2011-04-07	Attackers Ryubaku; RBD-262	Raizo
Marvelous Big Boobs MILF Monster Maria Yumeno 肉漬け義母ファッカー 野獣熟女の男を狂わす驚異の爆乳！！ 夢野まりあ	2011-04-25	Madonna; JUC-533	Kitorune Kawaguchi
Stolen Big Bust Wife Maria Yumeno 奪われた爆乳妻 身も心も夫の兄に寝取られて… 夢野まりあ	2011-05-07	Madonna; JUC-537	Eitaro Haga
Immoral Relatives Incest Family #1 近親家族遊戯 淫母相姦 ＃01	2011-08-10	Global Entertainment; MAC-02		With Chiruzu Iwasaki & Arisu Suzuki
Married Slave of Neighborhood Association 町内会奴隷人妻 夢野まりあ	2012-04-13	Goro Tameike; MDYD-679	Goro Tameike
Bitch Mother Maria Yumeno 雌豚母さん 夢野まりあ	2012-05-24	V&R Products; VSPDS-643	Eitaro Haga
Busty Beautiful Mature Lesbians 爆乳美熟女レズビアン	2012-05-25	Madonna; JUC-819	Eitaro Haga	With Yumi Kazama
Shaved Big Tits Mother Tempts Son 息子を誘惑する爆乳パイパン母	2012-11-25	Madonna; JUC-967	Eitaro Haga

== Magazine appearances ==
- Bejean
  - April 1999 (5p., nude)
- Weekly Playboy
  - June 6, 2000 (5p., nude)
  - August 22–29, 2000 (1p., nude)
  - December 26–31, 2000
  - April 3, 2001 (7p., nude)

== Bibliography ==
- "Maria Yumeno Profile and Filmography - AV Idol Directory".
- "Maria Yumeno - Moodyz Profile and Filmography" (in Japanese). Archived from the original on 2010-05-01.
- "Maria Yumeno - Attackers Profile and Filmography" (in Japanese). Archived from the original on 2010-09-22.
