= Try-Heart Corporation =

Japanese AV company

- Industry: Pornography
- Headquarters: Japan
- Products: Pornographic films
- Website: http://tryheart.jp/ http://www.sexia.tv/

The Try-Heart Corporation (トライハートコーポレーション, Torai Haato Kooporeeshon) is a Japanese adult video (AV) company best known for videos produced under its SexiA (セクシア, Sekushia) label.

== Company information ==
Try-Heart began releasing videos under the Pink Drug label at least as early as December 1995, and with production codes of the type SEA-xxx for the Sexia studio as early as April 1997 with the video Throbbing Kiss (ときめきＫｉｓｓ) starring Ao Amamai (天海あお), coded SEA-001. Several AV Idols worked for Try-Heart in the 1990s including Kyōko Kazama who starred in Super Breasts on the Pink Drug label in 1996, Haruki Mizuno who made her debut on the Sexia label in 1997, and Azumi Kawashima who debuted with Sexia in 1998.

The Try-Heart Corporation via its SexiA studio was considered to be one of the "mainstream" AV producers and was affiliated with the Kuki group, once the largest collection of AV companies in Japan, as early as February 2001. Try-Heart, along with the other companies associated with Kuki, used the X City website for sales and publicity for its SexiA and OFF SIDE labels. Like other members of the Kuki family of companies, Try-Heart belonged to the ethics group called in English the Nihon Ethics of Video Association (NEVA) or in Japanese 日本ビデオ倫理協会 (Nippon Bideo Rinri Kyoukai or Japan Video Morality Association), usually abbreviated as ビデ倫 (Biderin or Viderin). In 2004, Try-Heart left NEVA and the Kuki group of companies to join another ethics group VSIC (Visual Software Contents Industry Coop.) and become affiliated with the Hokuto Corporation group of companies which distributes Sexia and other Try-Heart videos through its DMM website.

In April 2005, eight years after SexiA video SEA-001 was issued in April 1997, Try-Heart released a Sexia video with production code SEA-429, making an average of about 54 videos per year for that period. However, in recent years, Sexia and Try-Heart have released very few videos and most have been compilations of earlier material. The official websites for Try-Heart and SexiA deal only in streaming and downloadable videos of older material while the DMM site (part of the Hokuto Corporation) which carries previously released DVD and video products includes more than 400 SexiA videos.

== Labels ==
Try-Heart issued the majority of its videos under the SexiA label but occasionally used other labels:

- Bad Boys
- Challenger
- Chao!!
- Diana
- OFF SIDE
- Pink Drug
- Pink Drug EX
- Pink Drug Stella

Some Try-Heart videos have also been issued under the company name Raising Company (レイジングカンパニー, Reijingu Kanpanii), usually using the OFF SIDE label.

== Actresses ==
In addition to Haruki Mizuno and Azumi Kawashima, some other actresses who have made their debut with Try-Heart are Asuka Sakamaki and Naho Ozawa in 2002, and Honoka in 2004. Actresses who have performed for Try-Heart include:

- Yumika Hayashi
- Honoka
- Azumi Kawashima
- Kyōko Kazama
- Eri Kikuchi

== Series ==
Video series produced by Try-Heart include:

- Call Girl (コールガール痴女)
- Costume Lovers (制服ラヴァーズ)
- I Wanna Suck (タマにはしゃぶりたい)
- Obscene Climax (猥褻クライマックス)
- Pretty Wife (プリティワイフ)
- Sexy Teacher's Secret Spot (女教師の秘蜜)
- Wet & Messy

== Sources ==
- "Try-Heart Corporation official website" (in Japanese).
- "SexiA official website" (in Japanese).
- "Try-Heart Videos on DMM" (in Japanese).
- "Sexia Videos on DMM" (in Japanese).
