= Waap Entertainment =

Japanese pornographic film company

- Industry: Pornography
- Founded: 1998
- Headquarters: Shinjuku, Tokyo, Japan
- Products: Pornographic films
- Website: http://www.waap.co.jp/

Waap Entertainment (ワープエンタテインメント, Waapu Entateinmento) is a Japanese adult video production company with headquarters in the Shinjuku Building, Shinjuku, Tokyo.

== Company information ==
Waap Entertainment was founded in 1998 and released its first videos in December of that year. The company specializes in single actress videos and is best known for its Dream Shower (ドリームシャワー, Doriimu Shawaa) series which premiered on December 17, 1998, with Dream Shower No.1 starring Izumi Maki and directed by Alala Kurosawa. The series is part bukkake and part gangbang and has appeared in more than sixty installments on the company's Beauty label. The studio is also recognized for having developed several prominent modern AV directors including Alala Kurosawa, [Jo]Style, K*WEST and KINGDOM.

When S1 No. 1 Style introduced the new less concealing digital mosaic style of censorship in late 2004, Waap followed soon afterward with their own Digital Mosaic (デジエロモザイク, Dejieromozaiku) videos. Waap Entertainment produces about 10 new videos per month and the Hokuto Corporation's AV retailer DMM listed more than 1500 DVD titles available under the Waap Entertainment name as of September 2011.

The company's reputation has extended to the Village Voice where columnist Johnny Maldoro named Waap's video Semen Club 2 (ザーメンクラブ2) starring Yui Kayama as the Bukkake Best of 2003. Waap has also expanded into another area of entertainment with game, puzzle and photo collection apps for the iPhone featuring some of the studio's top models.

== Labels ==
Waap has used a number of different labels for its videos since 1998:

- Beauty
- Boin Club
- Cobra
- Dragons Gate
- Encore
- Fearless
- Foxy
- Gone
- Jelly
- Kohshiro
- Milk
- Select
- Shoot
- So
- Star Box
- un/limited
- Washing Machine

== Directors ==
Prominent directors at Waap Entertainment include:

- [Jo]Style
- Goemon
- KINGDOM
- Koushirou
- Alala Kurosawa
- K*WEST

== Actresses ==
Popular AV Idols who have appeared in Waap Entertainment videos include:

- Bunko Kanazawa
- Kirari Koizumi
- Marin
- Aika Miura
- Momoka Nishina
- Nao Oikawa
- Maria Ozawa
- Asuka Sakamaki
- Riko Tachibana
- Tsubomi
- Akira Watase
- Maria Yumeno

== Series ==
Some popular Waap series:

- Dream Shower (ドリームシャワー)
- Slut Actress (痴女優)
- Your Masturbation Will Help You (アナタのオナニーたすけてアゲル)

== AV Open / AV Grand Prix ==
For the 2006 AV Open competition, Waap entered both the Main Stage and the Challenge stage. Their Main Stage entry was Only One - Miracle Woman (ONLY ONE 奇跡の女), video OPEN-0616, featuring several amateur actresses. In the Challenge Stage, the company nominated Divide My Pleasure (濃厚な面接) directed by Kirin, starring Ren Hitomi and Yuri Ueno, and labelled OPEN-0652.

Waap Entertainment was also one of the 19 companies which submitted entries for the 2007 AV Open contest. Their entry Deep Lesbian & Hot Semen & Black Fuck (熱吻ブラック), labelled OPEN-0717, was an interracial video starring Marin and Shiho, and directed by K*WEST. which finished in 8th place overall and won a Lily Franky Honorary President Prize.

The company was also one of the participants in the Hokuto Corporation sponsored 2008 AV Grand Prix with their entry Shall We Fuck x10 (現役東●生の挿入十番勝負とギリギリモザイク), AVGP-042, starring Lemon Tachibana and directed by K*WEST and Goemon. In the 2009 AV Grand Prix, Waap took one of the Special Awards Fetish Video for Tsubomi - Semen Club (蕾に滴る野蛮な汁), AVGP-148, with Tsubomi, directed by Takuan.

== Sources ==
- "Waap Entertainment Official Website".
- "Waap Entertainment Broadband Service Site". Archived from the original on 2010-06-19.
