= Red Room 2 =

2000 Japanese horror film

- Directed by: Daisuke Yamanouchi
- Written by: Daisuke Yamanouchi
- Starring: Miyuki Katō; Yukio Kokago; Salmon Sakeyama; Yūka Takahashi; Yūken Yoshida
- Cinematography: Masayoshi Nakai
- Production company: Japan Video Distribution (JVD) Co. Ltd.
- Distributed by: Japan Video Distribution (JVD) Co. Ltd. (Japan); Ace Deuce Entertainment (Japan); E-Net Frontier (Japan); TLA Releasing (United States); Unearthed Films (United States)
- Release date: 2000
- Running time: 81 minutes
- Country: Japan
- Language: Japanese

Red Room 2 (赤い密室(へや) 禁断の王様ゲーム, Akai misshitsu (heya): Kindan no ōsama geemu) is a 2000 Japanese V-cinema (direct-to-video) horror film directed by Daisuke Yamanouchi. It is the sequel to the 1999 film Red Room. Like its predecessor, the film revolves around four contestants on a reality TV game show who, as per the game rules, enact a series of tortures on each other in order to be the last person standing for a cash prize, with the tortures gradually escalating into extreme sadism and sexual abuse.
