= Tomoko Matsunashi =

Japanese film director and actress (born 1971)

- Born: April 14, 1971 (age 55); Hiroshima, Japan
- Occupations: Film director Screenwriter; Actress
- Years active: 1995–

Tomoko Matsunashi (松梨 智子, Matsunashi Tomoko) is a Japanese film director and actress. She was described in 2007 as one of the female Japanese directors who "have brought some needed originality and talent to contemporary Japanese cinema."

== Life and career ==
Tomoko Matsunashi was born in Hiroshima, Japan on April 14, 1971. She says she was interested in the theatre and wanted to be an actor from the time she was in elementary school. She attended Waseda University and although she studied business, she became part of an independent theatre group while at school.

She also became interested in film at that time and after graduation appeared as an actress in a film directed by one of the group's members which won the audience award at the Pia Film Festival. When the director left the group, Matsunashi decided to make her own films though she had no formal training in cinema. Her first film, the 1995 short, To Be or Not to Be, which she wrote, directed and acted in, won an Encouragement Prize in the Off Theater Competition at the 1996 Yubari International Fantastic Film Festival.

Matsunashi appeared as an actress in the March 1996 release Tokiwa: The Manga Apartment directed by Jun Ichikawa and was also in one of director Noboru Iguchi's early movies, Kurushime-san, which was first released in 1997. Iguchi's film won the Encouragement Prize at the 1998 Yubari International Fantastic Film Festival. In 1998 she was the companion and co-star of Katsuyuki Hirano in the second of his trilogy of bike-ride documentary movies Encyclopedia of a Drifter. The third movie in his trilogy, Shiro - The White from 1999, involved a hazardous solo trip to northern Hokkaido in a winter blizzard.

Matsunashi also continued directing and another of her early films, Bitch Matilda (1998), garnered her a nomination for the New Director's Award from the Directors Guild of Japan. Her next film, SABU, Goodbye to their Youth from 2000, was a mixture of science fiction and politics and was an early attempt by Matsunashi at a comic portrayal of young men from a woman's perspective. The film was shown theatrically in Osaka and Tokyo and at the TromaDance Film Festival in 2002. Matsunashi's next feature (from 2002) was Replicant Joe, with another science fiction-fantasy theme where the title character becomes a robot with a rocket-launcher arm and a small woolen penis.

International recognition came to Matsunashi with her 2005 film The Way of the Director which was shown at the Fantasia Festival in Montreal in July 2005 and at the Camera Japan festival in Rotterdam in June 2006. Matsunashi has said that all her films "are based on my own previous experiences with my ex-boyfriends" and The Way of the Director is centered around two characters Saito and Kitagawa who both aspire to be directors. Saito makes a name for herself in independent films but Kitagawa is persuaded by a friend to become a porn director though he still dreams of going legitimate. Meeting Saito again after ten years, Kitagawa gets the idea of filming a trek to northern Hokkaido in winter with Saito. When things go wrong and Saito dies, Kitagawa eats her flesh to survive but eventually succumbs as well. A friend rescues his film footage and Kitagawa finally becomes a mainstream director.

In November 2007, Matsunashi announced the shooting of her next film, Happy Darts, and asked Japanese darts fans to collaborate in its making. The comedy, released theatrically in Japan in November 2008, concerns an office lady whose humdrum life is changed when she attempts to win a national darts competition.

== Filmography (Director) ==
Filmography sources:

- 1995 To Be or Not to Be (惜しみなく愛は奪ふ, Oshiminaku ai wa ubau), 8mm, 28 min.
- 1996 Cherry Boys Legend, 8mm, 55 min.
- 1997 Seventeen, VTR, feature
- 1998 Bitch Matilda (毒婦マルチダ, Dokufu Maruchida), released April 3, 1999
- 2000 SABU: Goodbye to Their Youth (サノバビッチ☆サブ ～青春グッバイ～, Sanobabicchi ☆ SABU - Seishun Gubbai), released September 29, 2000
- 2002 Replicant Joe (近未来蟹工船 レプリカント・ジョー, Kin Mirai Kanikōsen Repurikanto Jō), released March 29, 2003
- 2004 Teacher Emanuelle, VTR, 33 min.
- 2005 Bitch Matilda 2, VTR, 30 min.
- 2005 The Way of the Director (映画監督になる方法, Eiga Kantoku), released April 8, 2006
- 2008 Happy Darts (Ｈａｐｐｙダーツ, Happy Dātsu), released November 8, 2008
- 2010 Sabi otoko sabi onna (サビ男サビ女), released January 15, 2011 (omnibus work with 4 other directors)
