= Gonzo pornography =

Pornography that places the viewer directly at the scene

Gonzo pornography is a style of pornographic film that attempts to place the viewer directly into the scene. Jamie Gillis is considered to have started the gonzo pornography genre with his On the Prowl series of films.

The name is a reference to gonzo journalism, in which the reporter is part of the event taking place. By comparison, gonzo pornography puts the camera right into the action, often with one or more of the participants filming and performing sexual acts, without the usual separation between camera and performers seen in conventional porn and cinema.

Gonzo porn is influenced by amateur pornography, and it tends to use far fewer full-body/wide shots in favor of more close-ups and heavy use of wider angle lenses (see: reality pornography). The loose and direct camera work often includes tight shots of the genitalia, unlike some traditional porn.

== See also ==
- Reality pornography – Candid portrayals of sexuality for the exclusive purpose of arousal
- Point-of-view pornography – Style of pornography
