= Azumi Kawashima =

Japanese idol and pornographic film actress (born 1979)

- 川島和津実
- Born: Azumi Kawashima; August 8, 1979 (age 46); Tokyo, Japan
- Occupation: AV idol
- Years active: 1998–2003
- Height: 1.56 m (5 ft 1 in)

Azumi Kawashima (Japanese: 川島和津実, Hepburn: Kawashima Azumi; Born August 8, 1979) is a Japanese idol and pornographic film actress (or adult video idol).

Kawashima was known as gravure princess when she began a career in the pornographic film industry in December 1998 She is one of the most prominent AV Idols around May 1999 and "the number 1 adult video idol" starting in August.

== Biography and career ==
Kawashima was born on August 8, 1979, in Tokyo, Japan. She likes to walk and swim. She becameone of the favorite actresses among fans of pornographic videos, mainly because of "her classic, elegant and distinguished beauty". She does not film extreme pornography or other similar videos. Her first film, Promise, was released in December 1998 under the brand Try-Heart Corporation's Sexia. In January 1999, Kawashima was the lead in Naive, a video released by Shy. Her next film for Sexia titled I Want To Hold You (February 1999) was a sex drama Return to Shy for Natural published in April 1999. This video, judged to be well performed with strong sex scenes, features bandits and a plot hatched for an assassination.

Kawashima succeeded the popular Haruki Mizuno in the series Pretty Wife published by Sexia. She made her entrance in the seventh episode, Dangerous Love Triangle, published in May 1999, playing the role of a victim of her evil stepmother. The latter, hoping to remove her son from the influence of his wife who she thinks is demoralizing, hires the services of two men to rape her. She believes that her son's witnessing the scene will lead him to divorce. The video ends with the mother-in-law waking up and realizing that it was all just a dream, which she nevertheless takes for a message ordering her to leave her son's house. ActionJAV rates this video as Another great action packed movie performed by the legendary Azumi Kawashima

Less than a year after Kawashima's debut, her popularity prompted Sexia to release a retrospective video, Azu-mi-x, which contains scenes taken from her first video alongside new ones All Stars: Erotic Lips Selection, a video by Sexia published in February 2000, brings together several actresses. Kawashima rubs shoulders with her former colleague from Pretty Wife Haruki Mizuno A second retrospective entitled Azu-mi-x II: Wazumi's Filmography was released in September 2000 in a collector's edition Memory followed by Complete Azumi Kawashima, released in July 2003, will be Kawashima's last videos.

In addition to her filmography, Kawashima posed for nine photo albums published between 1999 and 2003. and shot for the V-cinema a horror film Demon Killer or Junreiki 殉霊鬼(じゅんれいき) directed by Seki Akitsugu in which six men and women occupying a villa are attacked by a killer.

== Filmography (selective) ==
Video title	Producer Identification code	Director	Release
Promise/Appointment 約束	Try-Heart/Sexia; SEA-081	Greate Kazu	December 18, 1998
Naive 純真	Shy シャイ企画; FE-409	Takehiro Yasuda	January 31, 1999
I Want To Hold You 抱きしめたい	Try-Heart/Sexia; SEA-092	Shion Kageura	February 26, 1999
Genuine"/"Purity 生粋	Shy; FE-418	Kunihiro Hasegawa	March 23, 1999
Natural	Shy; FE-425	Hitoshi Mochinaga	April 30, 1999
Pretty Wife 7, Dangerous Love Triangle プリティワイフ7 あぶない三角関係	Try-Heart/Sexia; SEA-105	Makoto Nimekoji	May 21, 1999
Memories	Shy; FE-433	Hitoshi Mochinaga	June 18, 1999
Azu-mi-x あづ・みっ・くす; Compilation associée à quelques nouvelles scènes	Try-Heart/Sexia; SEA-121	Futoshi Sakura	August 14, 1999
Sexia Collection 1999 セクシアコレクション 1999; Avec Haruna Miwa, Kaori Shimizu, Mika Sanada & Ryo Aihara	Try-Heart/Sexia; SEA-143	Ebisu The Great	December 10, 1999
All Stars: Erotic Lips Selection; Compilation avec d'autres actrices	Try-Heart/Sexia; SEA-153	Ebisu The Great	February 18, 2000
Last Kiss	Sexia/Kasakura; KAN-014		May 19, 2000
10th. Anniversary The SHY History M&A; Avec Momo Aida	Shy; FEDX-009		June 26, 2000
Azu-mi-x II: Wazumi's Filmography; Compilation video	Try-Heart/Sexia; SEA-185	Goody	September 22, 2000
Forever	Shy; FEDV-048		March 3, 2001
Pretty Wife Remix プリティワイフ Re-mix; Avec Izumi Morino, Konomi Katori, Ryo Aihara, Yuka Asato & Yuuna Miyazawa	Try-Heart/Sexia; SEA-215		May 31, 2001
Return	Shy; FE-622		September 27, 2001
OFFSIDE: The Best Selection; Compilation avec 15 autres actrices	Raising Company/Off Side; OSD-060		December 12, 2001
Complete Azumi Kawashima コンプリート 川島和津実	Raising Company/Off Side; OSD-108		July 10, 2003
Memory: Azumi Kawashima 記憶 川島和津実	Try-Heart/Sexia; SEA-332	Mark Spell	July 19, 2003

== Bibliography ==
- "Azumi (Kawashima Azumi)". xxx.xcity.jp/idol.;
- "川島 和津実 - Kawashima Adumi". i-dic.dorachan.com..
