= Daisuke Yamanouchi =

Japanese film director

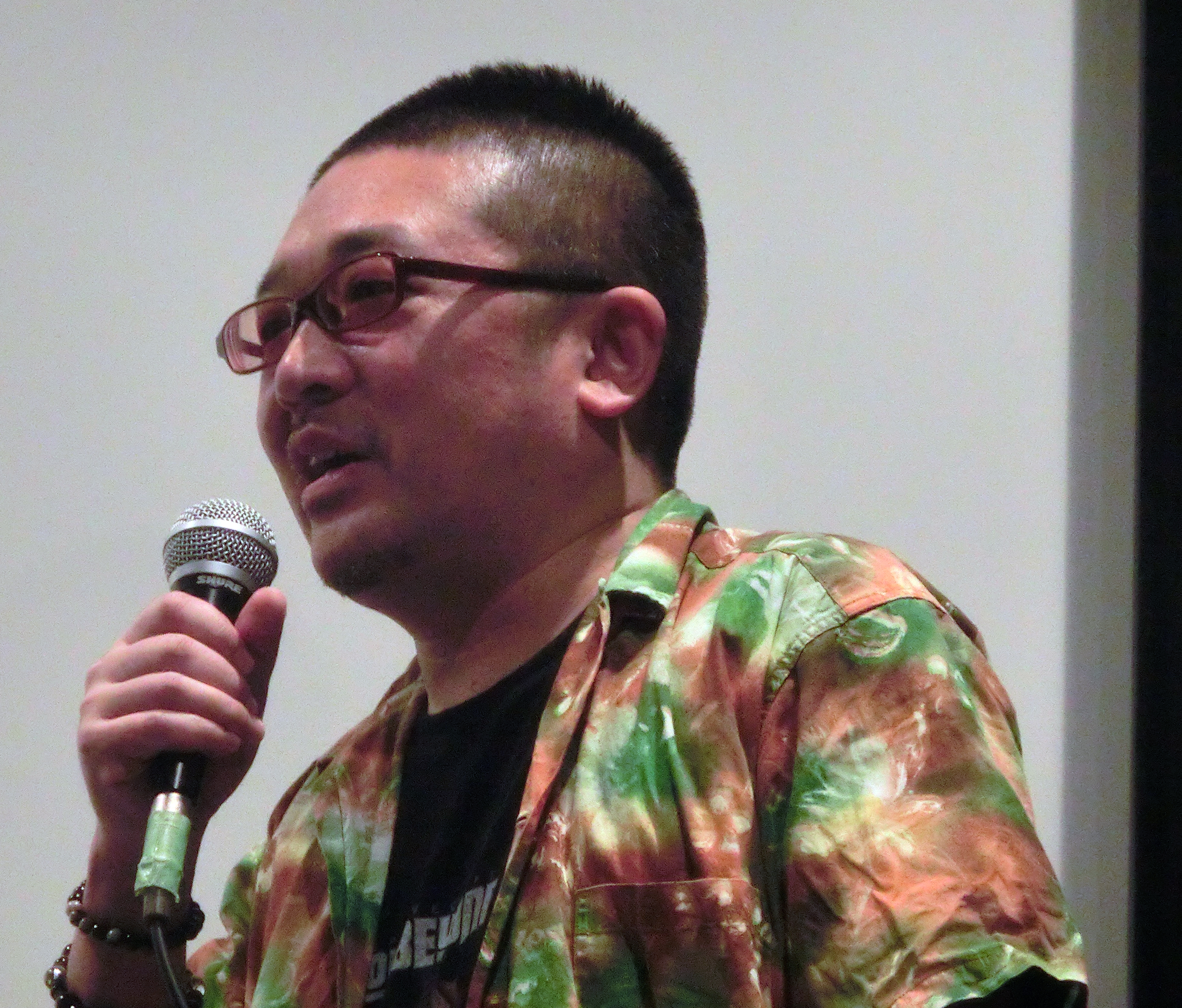
Daisuke Yamanouchi

Daisuke Yamanouchi (山内大輔, Yamanouchi Daisuke; born 4 July 1972) is a Japanese film director who has worked in mainstream film, pink film, straight-to-video V-cinema and adult videos (AV).

== Life and career ==
In 1994, Yamanouchi submitted his short film Blood Red Girls (血の赤に染めろ) to the Yubari International Fantastic Film Festival, where it won the Jury Prize in the Off Theater Competition. The following year, he worked as an Assistant Director under Keita Amemiya on the fantasy film, Moon Over Tao: Makaraga (タオの月, Tao no tsuki), which was released in November 1997. From 1998 to 2000, Yamanouchi wrote and directed a number of straight-to-video V-cinema productions, usually involving extreme gore and horror, such as Red Room, Girl Hell 1999, Muzan-e and Dead a Go! Go!, which were later released on DVD in the United States. These DVDs became well enough known in the United States to give Yamanouchi a mention in Alexandra Heller-Nicholas' 2011 book Rape-Revenge Films: A Critical Study.

In 2002, Yamanouchi made his directorial debut in pink film, with Maria Yumeno: Chō-inran onna no shiseikatsu starring AV Idol Maria Yumeno. His 2006 pink film, Beautiful Lesbian Sisters: On the Day of Mourning... won the Best Film, 4th Place at the 2006 Pink Grand Prix ceremony. He won a second award when his December 2010 film, Irokoi sata Sadako no bôken: Watashi no ai shita shôgu-tachi yo..., took the Best Film, 1st Place prize at the 2011 Pink Grand Prix ceremony.

Yamanouchi also ventured a bit into the Japanese adult video (AV) field with the Global Media Entertainment studio in 2005, directing four videos in their Boshisōkan yūgi series, featuring older women and incest themes.

In addition to his work in pink film, Yamanouchi continued writing and directing dozens of V-cinema movies, many in the horror and science fiction genres. In 2014, he was the editor of Yutaka Ikejima's film about a minor actor in the Japanese adult video (AV) industry, Oyaji Actor Z (おやじ男優Z, Oyaji danyū Z).
