= Real Works =

Japanese adult video producers

- Industry: Pornography
- Founded: 2005
- Headquarters: Tokyo, Japan
- Products: Pornographic films

Real Works (レアル・ワークス, Rearu Wākusu) was a Japanese company located in Tokyo that was involved in the planning and production of adult videos (AV). They were integrated with the AV company KM Produce in early 2011.

== Company information ==
Real Works released its first videos in January 2005 advertising a stellar lineup of AV actresses who had previously been with other studios: Hitomi Hayasaka, nao, Ran Monbu, Naho Ozawa, Akane Sakura, Yuna Mizumoto, Momo Nakamura, Yui Seto, Miyu Sugiura, Yui Miho & Sumire Aida. After S1 No. 1 Style introduced the new less concealing digital mosaic style of censorship in late 2004, several other companies followed suit in 2005, including Real Works with its "Super Digimo" (超デジモ) series.

In mid-2010 Real Works produced an average of about 8-10 videos per month and in May 2010, Japan's largest AV distributor, DMM, listed nearly 600 DVDs available under the Real Works name.

The company also produced a series of late night 30 minute broadcasts in 2007 featuring some of their top actresses for adult TV station ENTA! 371 (エンタ！371), part of the SkyPerfecTV satellite TV network.

Real Works was affiliated with the Media Station (Cosmos Plan) and KMP studios and KMP operated the Real Works website, realworks.tv. However, by at least April 2011, the Real Works website announced that Real had been integrated into the KMP website and from February 2011, the Real, Ecstasy and M labels were incorporated into KMP.

== Labels ==
Real Works used the following labels for its video products:

- Real
- Ecstasy
- M
- Real Guest
- Sugoi! (スゴイ！)
- Nyogun (女群)

== Actresses ==
Some of the more prominent actresses who performed for Real Works:

- Airi & Meiri
- Hotaru Akane
- Hitomi Hayasaka
- Hikari Hino
- Hime Kamiya
- Karen Kisaragi
- Yuna Mizumoto
- Yuka Osawa
- Maria Ozawa
- Riko Tachibana

== Series ==
Popular Real Works series include:

- Fiendish Fellatio Inferno (鬼フェラ地獄)
- Lecherous Fellatio (猥褻フェラチオ)
- Super Digimo (超デジモ)
- The Real (レアル)
- Torturing Slut (責め痴女)
- Ultimate Ecstasy (鬼イカセ)

== AV Open ==
Real Works was one of the 16 AV production companies which competed in the main section of the 2006 AV Open contest. Their entry, Special Galactic All-Stars (責め痴女 ハーレムSPECIAL), labeled OPEN-0615, with Karen Kisaragi, Riko Tachibana, Hotaru Akane, Noa and Nashigo Tanaka, was awarded a special prize by the Honorary President of the event.

The company's nominee for the 2007 AV Open was also a multi-actress video, I Will Become Your Wife - Harem 4-Hour Special (奥さんになってあげる ハーレム4時間スペシャル), labeled OPEN-716, and starring Noa, @You, Misaki Asoh, Moe Oishi and Emi Haruna. The entry finished in 9th place in the competition.

== Sources ==
- "KMP Website" (in Japanese).
