= Red Room (film) =

1999 Japanese horror film

- Directed by: Daisuke Yamanouchi
- Written by: Daisuke Yamanouchi
- Starring: Yuki Tsukamoto; Mayumi Ōkawa
- Cinematography: Yasutaka Funayama
- Production company: Japan Video Distribution (JVD) Co. Ltd.
- Distributed by: Japan Video Distribution (JVD) Co. Ltd. (Japan); Ace Deuce Entertainment (Japan); E-Net Frontier (Japan) Anthem Pictures (United States); TLA Releasing (United States); Unearthed Films (United States)
- Release date: 1999
- Running time: 68 minutes
- Country: Japan
- Language: Japanese

Red Room (赤い密室(へや) 禁断の王様ゲーム, Akai misshitsu (heya): Kindan no ōsama gēmu) is a 1999 Japanese V-cinema (direct-to-video) horror film written and directed by Daisuke Yamanouchi.

== Plot ==
The film follows a group of four contestants (a husband and wife on the verge of divorce, a young corporate woman, and a 17-year-old schoolgirl) on a reality TV game show who are locked in the titular "Red Room" to torture each other, with the last person standing winning ten million yen. The contestants are made to pick cards to decide who will pick the torture, who will apply it, and who will be the victim. The tortures chosen start off relatively mild, but gradually escalate into extreme sadism and sexual abuse.

== Cast ==
- Yuki Tsukamoto
- Mayumi Ōkawa
- Hiroshi Kitasenju
- Sheena Nagamori

== Release ==
The film was originally released in Japan in VHS format on June 4, 1999 and later as a DVD on December 22, 2005. Red Room was released in the US by Anthem Pictures on January 9, 2007.

In 2000, the film was followed by a sequel, titled Red Room 2.

== Reception ==
The film received mixed to negative reviews.
