= Eri Kikuchi =

Japanese pornographic actress

- 菊池えり / 菊池エリ
- Born: April 5, 1965 (age 61); Nagoya, Aichi Prefecture, Japan
- Other names: Mai Akimoto (秋本麻衣); Eriko Ishikawa (石川江梨子); Yumiko Hino (比野由美子)

Eri Kikuchi (Japanese: 菊池えり / 菊池エリ, Hepburn: Kikuchi Eri) is a pink film actress and an early Japanese AV idol of the 1980s.

== Life and career ==
Kikuchi was born in Nagoya, Aichi Prefecture, Japan on April 5, 1965. She started as a fuzoku (sex industry) girl in hotels and soaplands and also made appearances in several underground pornographic films. Her official AV debut was at age twenty in the video Beautiful D-Cup Girl, Sister L, released in September 1985 by CineMagic. Kikuchi has been called the first adult video performer whose career was built around her exceptionally large breasts for that time in Japan. The Big Bust genre, or "Kyonyu Boom" (巨乳ブーム), which Kikuchi pioneered would be set "on fire" at the end of the 1980s with the debut of Kimiko Matsuzaka in 1989, and become established as a major genre of adult entertainment in Japan in the 1990s.

Kikuchi's pink film debut was with Million Film in their Miss 20 Year-Old Momoko (ミス２０才 快感！百合子の本番) in 1986. In August of the same year, she starred in a pink film for Shintoho Eiga, Eri Kikuchi: Big Tits (菊池エリ 巨乳, Kikuchi Eri Kyonyu). This film has Kikuchi playing "Eri", a nude model and AV actress who becomes romantically involved with her manager. In 1988 she starred in one of Nikkatsu's last Roman Porno films, Eri Kikuchi: Big Tits Blame (菊池エリ 巨乳責め, Kikuchi Eri: Kyonyuzeme), and in 1993 she would star in another theatrical Big-Bust title (巨乳熟女 本番仕込み), for Excess Films, Nikkatsu's post-Roman Porno line of theatrical softcore pornography. During the late 1980s and early 1990s, Kikuchi also appeared in a number of photobooks, mostly with the BDSM theme of rope bondage.

In 2003, she was working as a lecturer/demonstrator at the AV Cultures School, a school started by male AV actor, Shinji Kubo, to train future AV directors.

By December 2004 Kikuchi, aged 39, had returned to AV with a series of videos for Madonna, a studio specializing in "mature" actresses. She also performed in Mourning Dress Slave / Eri Kikuchi in July 2005 for CineMagic, the AV company she had made her début with 20 years previously.

As of 2013, Eri Kikuchi was billed at the Nagoya fashion health Nishiki VIP Toshima.

== Partial videography ==
Release date	Video title	Company	Director	Notes
1985-09	Beautiful D-Cup Girl, Sister L D-CUP美少女 シスターＬ; D-Cup Bishojo Sister L	CineMagic		AV debut
1986-02-15	Slave Flower; D-CUP奴隷花	CineMagic; CS-01		With Yuuko Morishita
1988-05-25	Romance Collection Deluxe ロマンコレクション デラックス	Athena Eizou; AV-15	Hikaru Kito	With Keiko Nakazawa, Itsumi Shikata, Anri Inoue, Mika Kawamura, Kei Asami & Michiru Kaneko
1988-06-23	Rose Lady, The Doll 2 D-CUP薔薇の貴婦人 ＴＨＥ ＤＯＯＬII	CineMagic; VS-64	Namio Ikebe	
1993-01-29	F-Cup Typhoon; D-CUPＦカップ・タイフーン	Kuki; QX-269	Harry Sugino	
2001-01-13	Lesbian Collection 10; D-CUP百合図鑑10	CineMagic; CS-268		With Anri Inoue & Hikari Harada
2001-08-10	Pink Cinema Paradise 3	Try Heart; PKD-029		With Yasuko Yagami
2004-12-15	Madonna School - Rebellion of Mothers マドンナ学園 - 母たちの反乱	Madonna; JUK-125 (VHS); JUKD-125 (DVD)		With Ayano Murasaki
2005-01-15	Failure As A Wife 不倫白書 妻失格	Madonna; JUK-140 (VHS); JUKD-140 (DVD)		With Mai Nakagawa
2005-03-11	Abnormal Hunting: Mourning Dress Slave 27; Abnormal Hunting 喪服奴隷XXVII	CineMagic Collect; VS-770 (VHS)	Hidekazu Takahara	
2005-03-15	Married Woman and Lover 妻と愛人	Madonna; JUK-170 (VHS); JUKD-170 (DVD)		With Natsuko Kayama
2005-04-15	Oiran (Courtesan) 花魁（おいらん）	Madonna; JUK-183 (VHS); JUKD-183 (DVD)		With Aoi Yoshino & Hitomi Tachibana
2005-05-15	Failure as a Mother 5 近親白書 母親失格 ５	Madonna; JUK-201 (VHS); JUKD-201 (DVD)		With Riho Matsuoka
2005-07-22	Mourning Dress Slave / Eri Kikuchi 喪服奴隷 菊池えり	CineMagic Collect; DD-140	Hidekazu Takahara	
2006-03-10	Duty Vol.64; Duty Vol.64 勝ち組マダムはおしゃぶり上手	J-Spot; DT-64		Uncensored
2007-03-23	The Doll, Tortured Bride; The DOLL 被虐の花嫁	CineMagic Collect; DD-238	Namio Ikebe; Shinsuke Kawazu	Compilation containing two earlier videos Rose Lady - The Doll & Tortured Bride

== Sources ==
- Adachi, Noriyuki (1992). アダルトな人びと (Adaruto na Hitobito/"Adult" People (in Japanese). Tokyo: Kodansha. p. 97. ISBN 4-06-205546-5.
- "Adult video veteran turns porn pedant for new stick flick school". Mainichi Shimbun. June 11, 2003.
- "Eri Kikuchi". AV Idol Directory.
- "菊地エリ (Kikuchi Eri - Moodyz profile and filmography)" (in Japanese). Moodyz. Archived from the original on 2010-05-29.
