= Madonna (studio) =

Japanese adult video company

- Industry: Pornography
- Founded: 2003
- Headquarters: Tokyo, Japan
- Products: Pornographic films
- Parent: Hokuto Corporation
- Website: Official website

Madonna (マドンナ, Madonna) is a Japanese adult video (AV) studio which specializes in the jukujo niche of Japanese pornography. By 2007, Madonna also launched the label Fitch, which has a focus on the bakunyū niche.

== Company information ==
Madonna is an AV studio located in Tokyo, Japan which is affiliated with the large AV conglomerate Hokuto Corporation which distributes its videos through the DMM website. The General Manager of the company is Katsuhisa Aoyagi (青柳勝久).

Madonna registered its website www.madonna-av.com in October 2003 and released its first videos in December 2003. Their premier video, Man-Eating Mature Women - Semen Squeezing (JUK-001) starred Maki Tomoda, Aki Tomosaki and Mayumi Kusunoki.: The company specializes in movies in the "mature woman" (熟女, jukujo) or MILF pornography genre, sometimes with an incest theme. Such mature woman productions have been a growing trend in Japanese porn since the mid-1990s and were popularized in AV by director Goro Tameike at the end of the 1990s. In addition to Aki Tomosaki and Maki Tomoda, other mature actresses who appeared in early Madonna videos were Ayano Murasaki and Runa Akasaka. Eitaro Haga has been the company's chief director, with a listing of more than 150 videos for Madonna by late 2011.

Since their inception, the studio's original videos used production codes series of the type JUK-001 for VHS releases and JUKD-001 for DVD releases. Compilation videos were labeled in the series JUS-001 and JUSD-001. In December 2008, the original code was filled when video JUKD-999 was released. A new series of codes for DVDs was inaugurated in January 2009 in the format JUC-001. Compilation videos are still using the JUSD-xxx format. The studio produces a total of about 20 original and compilation videos per month. As an addition to the standard Madonna label, in November 2007, Madonna instituted a new label, Fitch, which uses codes of the type JUFD-001. In November 2011, the DMM website listed a total of 2082 DVDs available under the Madonna name.

Madonna released its first 3D video, 3D Co-Starring Mature Beauties: Tempting Love of Mother and Aunt, directed by Eitaro Haga and starring Ayano Murasaki and Reiko Makihara, on February 25, 2011.

== AV Grand Prix ==
Madonna entered the 2008 AV Grand Prix competition with the 3-hour video MADONNA BOOTCAMP ELITE [AVGL-025] directed by [Jo]Style and starring Ryoko Murakami, Chisato Shouda, Sayaka Kawase, Rina Uozumi, Mami Todo, Asami Kitamura, Shino Kodama and Rie Sato. In the 2009 AV Grand Prix, the Madonna entry Raped Female Teacher (犯された女教師) [AVGL-136], starring Reiko Makihara and directed by Eitaro Haga, won one of the Special Awards for Mature Woman Videos.

== Actresses ==
AV actresses performing in Madonna videos include:

- Yumi Kazama
- Kyōko Aizome
- Yumika Hayashi
- Kyōko Kazama
- Eri Kikuchi
- Natsumi Kitahara
- Riri Kōda
- Chisato Shouda
- Maki Tomoda
- Aki Tomosaki
- Maria Yumeno
- Minami Kojima
- Ririko Kinoshita
- Hayama Sayuri
- Ayumi Ryou
- Mako Oda
- Fuji Kanna
- Kodama Rena
- Kano Ai
- Kaori
- Miyabe Ryoka
- Ichino Aoi
- Kuriyama Rio
- Mito Kana
- Mizuno Yuuka
- Mukai Ai
- Okimiya Nami
- Ooshima Yuuka
- Rukawa Haruka
- Sata Mariko
- Shinna Yuna
- Shiraishi Marina
- Tada Yuka
- Takeuchi Yuuki
- Ueha Aya
- Meguri
- Yuuka Mizuno
- Yuka Tada
- Maki Tomoda
- Momoko Isshiki
- Rieko Hiraoka

== Actors ==
AV actors performing in Madonna videos include:

- Hajime Himori
- Yuzuru Yuuki
- Isedon Uchimura
- Horio

== Series ==
Some popular titles among the more than 60 series produced by Madonna include:

- Amateur Madame Hunting (素人人妻ナンパ )
- Apartment Wife (団地妻)
- Beautiful Mature Lady and Black Men (美熟女と黒人)
- Celebrity Busty Mature Women: Best Male Virgin! (豊乳美熟女 最高の筆おろし!)
- Failure As a Mother (近親白書)
- Friend's Mother (友達の母)
- Fucked by Father-in-law ... (義父に犯されて…)
- I Want to Fuck My Mother! (母さんとしたい！)
- In Front Of Loving Husband's Eyes ... (愛する夫の目の前で…)
- My Aunt (僕のおばさん)
- Sensual Life of the Beautiful Wives (悶絶美熟女の卑猥な日常)
- Sex at 40 (四十路の性)
- Sex at 50 (五十路の性)
- The Neighbour's Wife (となりの奥さん)
