= Naked Continent =

- Directed by: Sakkun
- Production company: Natural High
- Distributed by: Soft On Demand
- Release date: May 1, 2006
- Running time: 90 minutes
- Country: Japan
- Language: Japanese

Naked Continent (裸の大陸) is a Japanese adult video (AV) from 2006 which spawned a series of seven sequels, two compilation DVDs, a five part compilation for the 15 year anniversary of the original film and a spinoff by another Japanese Adult Video company.

== Original ==
The first Naked Continent video was released on May 1, 2006 by the Natural High studio, part of the Soft On Demand (SOD) porn conglomerate. The movie is in a documentary travelog format as it follows a Japanese adult video (AV) actress Kaoruko Wakaba and the filming crew from Japan to Africa. Scenes with local people and various wildlife are interspersed with sex scenes in the 90 minute video. The director was Sakkun (サックン) who has directed several other movies for Natural High.

Naked Continent was the Natural High entry (labeled OPEN-0654) in the 2006 AV Open contest which was decided by most sales during the period May + June 2006. The video, which was entered in the Challenge Stage for new directorial talent, took the 1st Place Award and was also given a second special award by the judges.

== Sequels ==
Seven sequels and two compilation DVDs have been issued by Natural High in the years since the original video was released. All were also directed by Sakkun (サックン).

- Naked Continent 2 (裸の大陸2) was released on 19 October 2006 with production code NHDT-379. The 90 minute video starred Naoko Imokawa. The same documentary travelog mode was used but this time the scene of action was villages in Papua New Guinea.
- Naked Continent 3 (裸の大陸3) was released on 8 March 2007 with production code NHDT-423. The 90 minute video starred an unidentified actress. Once again in the travelog documentary style, this video is advertised as taking place down the Amazon River in a canoe. The video ranked number 18 in sales for SOD for October 2007.
- Naked Continent & Naked Continent 2 (裸の大陸＆裸の大陸 2) was released by Natural High on 8 November 2007 with production code NHDT-548. This 180 minute compilation video combined the original Naked Continent and the sequel Naked Continent 2 into a single package.
- Naked Continent 4 (裸の大陸4) was released on 8 May 2008 with production code NHDT-634. The 95 minute video starred AV actress Yuka Osawa. The area visited is described only as unexplored regions without cell phones. This version also sold well, ranking number 9 in sales for SOD for November 2008.
- Naked Continent Charity Project (裸の大陸 チャリティープロジェクト) was released on 18 September 2008 with production code NHDT-704. The 160 minute video starred actress Nana Saeki and in addition to the standard travel and sex scenes, this edition of the series features Saeki working as a volunteer with a charitable organization and children in Kenya. The Charity Project video was the 9th place bestseller for SOD for March 2009.
- Naked Continent 5 (裸の大陸5) was released on 5 March 2009 with production code NHDT-783. The 90 minute video starring actress Yuu Shiraishi was located in a "tribal" area.
- Naked Continent Remix - Popular Actresses vs Savage Natives - 4 Hour Special (裸の大陸リミックス ～「人気女優VS野蛮原住民」4時間特番スペシャル～) was released on December 19, 2009 with the production code NHDT-911. The four hour compilation DVD combines selected scenes from all six of the previous Naked Continent videos.
- Naked Continent 6 (裸の大陸6) was released on 22 April 2010 with the production code NHDT-959. The 120 minute video stars actress Yui Takagi and once again the crew and actress travel to Africa to exchange cultures.
- Naked Continent Special Edition. Crempie Sex With A Delightful Homeless Woman In India (裸の大陸 特別編) was released on 23 September 2012 with the production code NHDTA-286 and ran for 200 minutes. The DVD stars Nakano Arisa who in addition to the standard sex scenes, also performs a naked Ganges bath and a sex scene with an Indian religious ascetic (sadhu).

== Anniversary Collection ==
On 10 October 2019, 5 DVDs titled Natural High A Commemoration Of 15 Miraculous Years A Super Select Collection (ナチュラルハイ奇跡の15周年記念 厳選集) with the production code prefix "NHDTA-597-F" were released to celebrate the 15 year anniversary of Natural High. They featured selected scenes from previous Natural High releases.

Title	Production code	Running time
VOL.1 - This Is How The "Extreme Exhibitionist" Was Born (過激露出は”はこうして誕生した)	NHDTA-597-F-1	118 Minutes
VOL.2 - I Can't Escape! The Sexual Case Files (逃げられない！性の事件簿)	NHDTA-597-F-2	131 Minutes
VOL.3 - We'll Never Be Able To Film Such Exquisite Ecstasy Like This Again (二度と撮れない絶景アクメ)	NHDTA-597-F-3	127 Minutes
VOL.4 - These Male Desires Really Happened (男の欲望が現実に起きた)	NHDTA-597-F-4	113 Minutes
VOL.5 - Bodily Fluids (愛液汗唾液涎失禁)	NHDTA-597-F-5	116 Minutes

== Spinoff ==
In 19 October 2009, DANDY (another Japanese Adult Video producing studio) released a DVD titled Naked Continent - Dandy Version vol. 1 (裸體大陸花花公子版 VOL.1) directed by Nagase Hawaii with the production code DANDY-155 and had a running time of 206 minutes.

== Charity project ==
At a press conference in Shinjuku, Tokyo held in August 2008 by Natural High to promote the Naked Continent Charity Project video, the company announced they would be taking part in a charity project in Kenya. Sakkun, the director of the "Naked Continent" series, said he was struck by the poverty of children in Africa in his previous trips to the continent and he wanted to do something to help. The company was turned down by some charitable groups but found one organization who was interested, the Musona Self Help Group (MSHG), which helps orphans in western Kenya. Natural High donated 1 million yen (about $10,000 at the time) to the group with a further donation of 1,000 yen (about $10 at the time) for each copy of the Naked Continent Charity Project DVD sold.

However, after returning from Africa and editing the video, Natural High ran into problems. Japanese AV producers belong to one of several voluntary ethics organizations which police video content and the mosaic pixelation to obscure the genitals required in Japan. Natural High, like other SOD companies, belongs to the Content Soft Association (CSA) which was created by Soft On Demand. CSA insisted that the company use the mosaic on the faces of all children shown in the video since the video also contained sex scenes (the children were not present at any of the sex scenes). Director Sakkun said it was sad that all the children's smiling faces would have to be obscured.

When English language versions of the Japanese articles about the video appeared, they prompted commentary and expressions of moral outrage (from several different perspectives) about pornography and exploitation. These accounts all state or assume that the actress is having sex with "tribesmen", something not found in the original Japanese articles or the Natural High descriptions.
