= Akari Asahina =

Japanese actress

- 朝日奈あかり
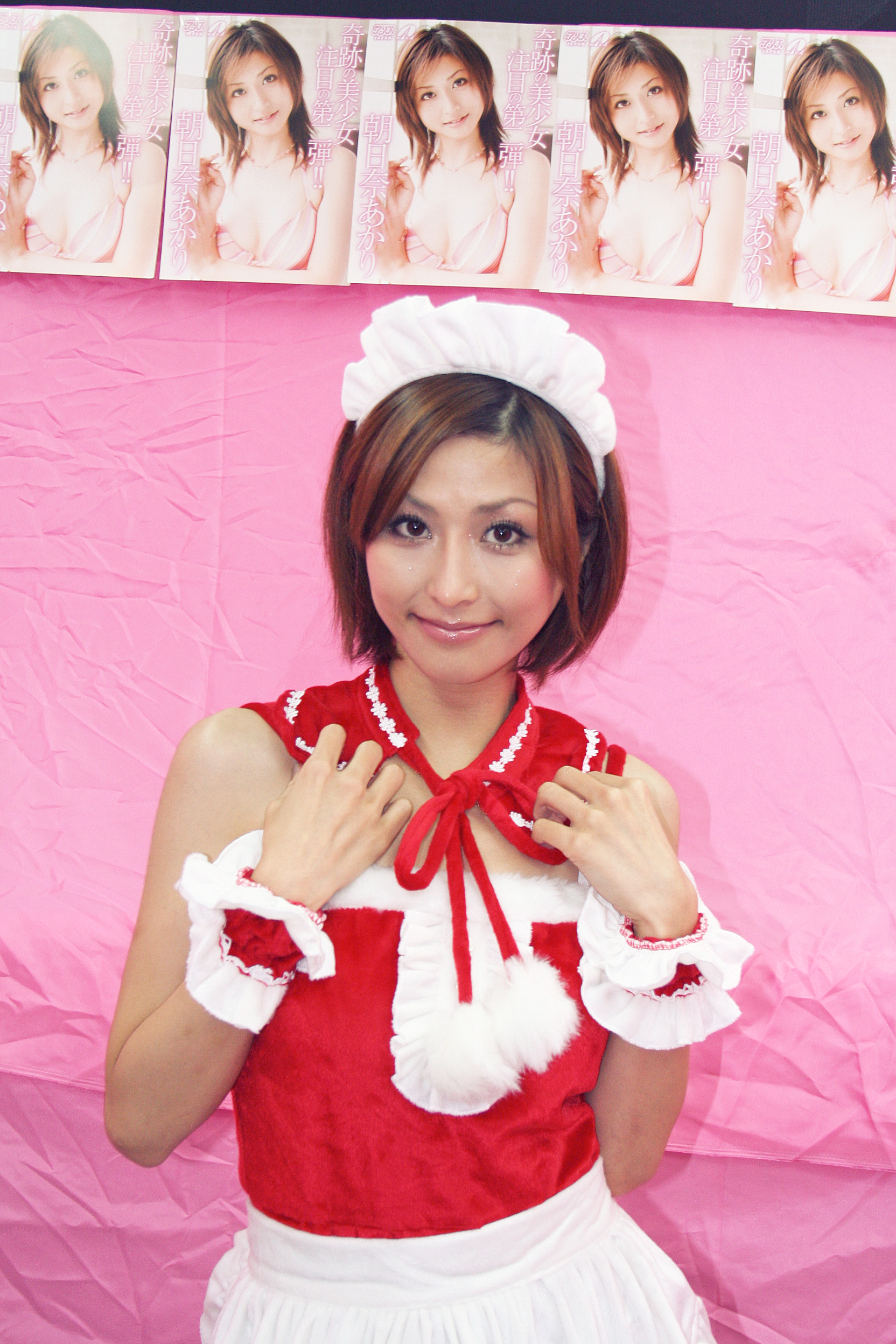
- _{Autograph-signing event in Kobe, Hyogo}
- Born: 30 May 1988 (age 38)
- Occupation: Actress
- Website: website

Akari Asahina (Japanese: 朝日奈あかり, Hepburn: Asahina Akari; born 30 May 1988) is a Japanese actress and AV idol.

== Early life and career ==
In 2009, Asahina played Elina Kanzaki in the second season of the TV Tokyo television drama Jyouou Virgin, an adaptation of the manga Jōō. Asahina co-hosted the TV Saitama variety show Beach 9 (ビ〜チ9, Bi 〜 chi 9) from January 2009 to December 2010. In 2011, she appeared in the Android application Delusion Phone App.

In 2012, Asahina was featured in the application Akari Asahina sexy AV alarm 2. That same year, she starred in the sixth episode of the TV Asahi series Friday Night Drama.

Asahina was a member of the idol group "BRW 108".
