= CineMagic Co. =

Japanese adult film production company

CineMagic シネマジック
- Type: Corporation
- Industry: Pornography
- Founded: November 11, 1983
- Headquarters: 〒 165-0021 Maruyama, Nakano-ku, Tokyo 2-6-12, Japan
- Products: Pornographic films
- Number of employees: 25
- Website: cinemagic.co.jp

CineMagic Co. Ltd. (株式会社シネマジック), is a Japanese adult film studio, producing and distributing its own films, usually of the bondage, S&M and simulated rape genre, as well as those produced externally.

== Company information ==
The CineMagic company was founded on November 11, 1983, in Tokyo, and they continue to this day in Nakano, Tokyo, with twenty-five employees. In the early 1980s when CineMagic was founded, the VCR had only modest market penetration in Japan and the first AV companies and actresses were just beginning to appear. One of CineMagic's early stars was the "big-bust" actress Eri Kikuchi who made her official AV debut with the video Beautiful D-Cup Girl, Sister L which was released by CineMagic in September 1985.

CineMagic videos are available as online downloads and streaming video from its homepage but DVD versions are distributed through the Hokuto Corporation via its DMM website.

The company belonged to Soft On Demand's Contents Soft Association (CSA) before its closure.

== Labels ==
In addition to videos produced under the CineMagic name, the company also uses the following labels:

- Collect (コレクト) – main label featuring popular actresses
- Eva
- Gang – features orgy and cosplay videos
- kanjuku (完熟)
- Jyou (縄【ジョウ】) –features bondage videos
- Lilies – exclusively lesbian videos
- NOIR (ノワール) - specializes in extreme material, amateurs, bondage & enema
- Vixen (ビクセン)

== Actresses ==
Due to its emphasis on bondage and S&M, actresses specializing in the milder glamour-oriented forms of AV seldom worked for CineMagic but a number of AV Idols have appeared (at least occasionally) in CineMagic videos:

- Kyōko Aizome
- Minami Aoyama
- Rinako Hirasawa
- Bunko Kanazawa
- Mariko Kawana
- Eri Kikuchi
- Hitomi Kobayashi
- Anna Kuramoto
- Aika Miura
- Nozomi Momoi
- Fuka Sakurai
- Riko Tachibana
- Maki Tomoda
- Aki Tomosaki
- Akira Watase
- Sally Yoshino
- Maria Yumeno

== Series ==
A short list of some popular CineMagic series:

- Immoral Angel (インモラル天使)
- Mourning Dress Slave (喪服奴隷)
- Sacrifice of White Robe (白衣の生贄)
- Slave Secretary (奴隷秘書)
- The Big Breast Slave Girl (巨乳隷嬢)
- The Obedient Servant (服従の奉仕メイド)
- The Private Teacher of Disgrace (恥辱の家庭教師)
- Tortured Race Queen (被虐のレースクイーン)

== Filmography ==
- Sortable English filmography at cinemagic.co.jp
