= Reality pornography =

Candid portrayals of sexuality for the exclusive purpose of arousal

Reality pornography is a genre of pornography where staged scenes, usually shot in cinéma vérité fashion, set up and precede sexual encounters. These scenes may either have the camera operator directly engaging in sex (as in gonzo pornography) or merely filming others having sex. The genre presents itself as "real couples having real sex". It has been described as professionally made porn which seeks to emulate the style of amateur pornography.

The niche's popularity grew significantly in the 2000s. Examples include the Girls Gone Wild and Girls Who Like Girls Series. The work of Bruce Seven has been called reality porn, due to his lack of using scripts and asking his performers to act naturally in their own character. Reality Kings, Money Talks and Brazzers are other reality porn websites.

In order to comply with the industry's requirements for sexually transmitted disease (STD) testing, the vast majority of reality porn involves professional actors and actresses posing as so-called "amateurs." Even though the performers who perform in these films typically appear on many reality websites within a short span of time, most of these websites claim that each of them is an amateur.

== See also ==
- Gonzo pornography – Pornography that places the viewer directly at the scene
- Point-of-view pornography – Style of pornography
