= Elly Akira =

Japanese pornographic actress

- 晶エリー
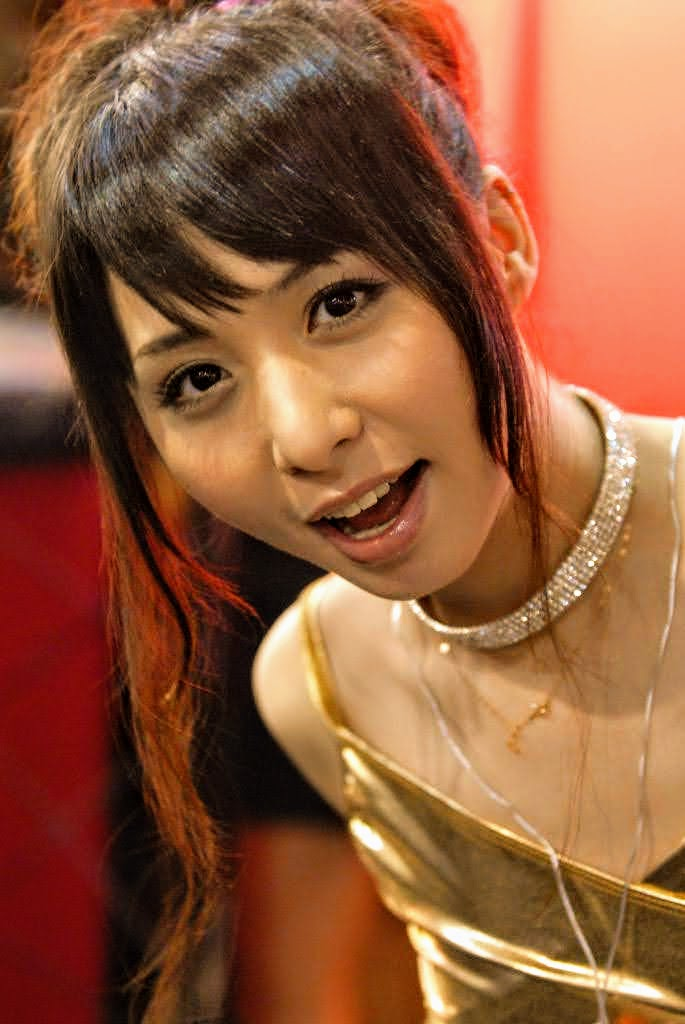
- Akira in 2008
- Born: Fareeza Terunuma; Saudi Arabia
- Other names: Akira Elly, Yuka Osawa
- Years active: 2005–2016, 2019–present

Elly Akira (Japanese: 晶エリー, Hepburn: Akira Erī; born Fareeza Terunuma (Japanese: 照沼ファリーザ, Hepburn: Terunuma Farīza) (Note: Arabic: فريزا تيرونوما)) is a Japanese AV actress and adult model. She was formerly known as Yuka Osawa (大沢佑香, Ōsawa Yūka). A highly prolific performer, she had appeared in more than 900 adult videos, with 800 currently listed on the site of the major Japanese video retailer DMM.

== Biography ==
=== Yuka Osawa - AV debut ===
Akira was born in Saudi Arabia to a Japanese mother and Syrian father and is the second of three daughters. She has stated that although she was born in Saudi Arabia, she grew up in Tokyo, Japan and was not raised in the Islamic faith.

She started her AV career in July 2005 under the name of Yuka Osawa with the video First Flower (Debut) - Yuka Osawa for the KUKI production studios and around 2006 she transferred to the highly esteemed AV studio S1 No. 1 Style. However, after a few films, she became a freelance (kikatan) actress working with many studios. She earned the title "Queen Shiofuki" (or splash queen) after a string of movies from 2007 with names like Tokyo Slimy Night, Splash Girl and Non Stop Orgasm.

Akira made her debut in the softcore genre of pink film in 2007, appearing in three titles directed by Yutaka Ikejima including Fascinating Woman: The Temptation of Creampie, which was named as Best Film 8th Place at the 20th Pink Grand Prix, a Japanese annual film awards event. For her work in these films, Akira was given one of the Best New Actress awards.

Akira (then known as Osawa) quickly became known for prolific output and willingness to appear in extreme or highly fetishist roles. She became a regular go-to-actress for studios like Dogma or Natural High and even performed the most demanding type of roles that included anal sex, S&M, enemas, and urolagnia.

In May 2008, she starred in Naked Continent 4 (裸の大陸4), the best-selling fourth entry in Soft On Demand's controversial AV series Naked Continent. At the 2009 AV Grand Prix Awards, Akira (as Yuka Osawa) took two top prizes, the Digital Sales Award for her video Vomit Enema Ecstasy X co-starring Mayura Hoshitsuki for the Dogma studio, and a second award, the Best Lovely / Moe Video for her solo work Tera-Dick (Real Creampie Absolute Angel).

=== Elly Akira ===
In 2009, she changed her name to Elly Akira and had roles in mainstream films such as the drama Yoko Namino: On Special Assignment (特命女子アナ並野容子, Tokumei joshi-ana: Namino Yōko) directed by Yūji Tajiri and released in Japan on 18 September 2009 and When You Love and When You Are Loved (愛するとき,愛されるとき, Aisuru toki, aisareru toki) from the Love&Eros CINEMA COLLECTION which was released in October 2010. In March 2010, she was one of five actresses nominated as Best Actress at the Adult Broadcasting Awards ceremony.

Akira was on hand in January 2011 to help launch a new label Atom (アトム) for one of Japan's largest AV producers, Soft On Demand (SOD). On 19 November 2011, she starred in W Monster - Golden Showers Anal And Creampies along with fellow AV actress Marica Hase.

In 2012, video retailer DMM held a vote for the 30th anniversary of the debut of adult videos in Japan to determine the best actresses. Akira was selected as one of the top 100 AV actresses of all time, coming in at number 55. Also in 2012, she starred as a female ninja (kunoichi) in the action period movie Kunoichi shokei jin gōmon jigoku tabi (くノ一処刑人 拷問地獄旅) which reached theaters in June 2012.

In June 2012, she took a part in the Japanese show, where two people are placed together in an apartment for one day to see what will happen. At certain moments they post their thoughts to the Twitter. In this episode, the show places Akira together with a 21-year-old college student virgin.

Akira had traveled to Taiwan as an artist and disaster fundraiser in 2009 but she was also known there as an AV Idol. In June 2012, the Taiwan online news service NowNews selected her at number five in their list of the Ten Top Japanese AV actresses under her previous name of Yuka Osawa.

Akira retired from active performing around late 2012, and only made some sporadic AV appearances in 2014 and 2015 like the tentacle-porn themed 2-Hole Tentacular Confinement for Moodyz. After spending some time away from the industry, Akira announced her return in July 2019 on her new Twitter account with her returning film co-starring famous AV actress Yui Hatano.

=== Photographer and artist ===
Akira debuted as a photographer in 2008 under her birth name, Fareeza Terunuma, and in 2009 appeared as the subject of her own exhibition at the 12th Geisai Art Fair. As a performance artist, she was attired as a toilet surrounded by a series of self-portraits. Her exhibit won the Lily Franky (リリー・フランキー) Award.

As Terunuma, she held a photo exhibition in Tokyo in May–June 2009 and later that year in November 2009, she was one of a group of well-known artists who were invited to design T-shirts to raise money for the victims of Typhoon Morakot. The venture, 1NCOMING Aid, was sponsored by the Taiwan magazine 1NCOMING and the Greystone Arsenal boutique in Taiwan. Akira travelled to the store for an autograph session to promote the venture. In September 2010, she had a solo exhibit at the Vanilla Gallery (ヴァニラ画廊) in Ginza. and also had her own show of artwork at The Artcomplex Center of Tokyo (A.C.T.) in November 2010.

The Japanese publishing company East Press (イースト・プレス) published a volume of her photographs in December 2011 under the title Shokuyoku to seiyoku : Terunuma farīza no wandārando (照沼ファリーザのワンダーランド～食欲と性欲～; literally Fareeza Terunuma's Wonderland: Gluttony and Lust) (ISBN 978-4781607146). Her work's combining of art, food, and sexual desire was commented on in the "EAT ART" exhibition at the Design Festa gallery in Tokyo.

She traveled to Taiwan again in August 2012 for an exhibit of her artwork in Taipei and Tainan.

== Filmography ==
=== Adult videos (AV) ===
Release date	Video title	Company	Director	Notes
2005-07-31	First Flower (Debut) - Yuka Osawa 初花-hatsuhana- 大沢佑香	Kuki; AZRD-045	Kyousei	AV debut
2007-07-19	Lost The Virgin By Beautiful Sis 綺麗なお姉さんの筆おろし	V&R Products; VSPDS-259	Uzumaki Sasaki	With Hikaru Hozuki
2007-12-15	Tokyo Slimy Night VOL.3	Teikuwan Hokusai; HOKU-005		
2007-12-15	Tora Tora Platinum Vol. 24	Tora-Tora-Tora		Uncensored
2008-01-17	Yuka Osawa Having Nakadashi Sex in Her Room 大沢佑香が自分の部屋で中出しSEX	Rocket; RCT-003	Shingo Takemoto	
2008-01-19	Splash Girl 02 - Yuka Osawa	Momotaro Squirt; DSQ-02		
2008-03-06	SOD Rape Hospital The Premium; SOD陵辱病棟 The プレミアム	SOD; SDMS-395	Nampaou	With Asami, Nene, Akane Mochida, Hikari Hino, Anna Kosaka, Tsubomi & Rimu Himeno
2008-07-04	Tora Tora Platinum Vol. 45	Tora-Tora-Tora		Uncensored
2008-05-08	Naked Continent 4 裸の大陸4	Natural High; NHDT-634	Sakkun	
2008-05-08	The Ultimate Invention Vol.4: The Swap Men & Women Camera 究極の妄想発明シリーズ第4弾 男女入れ替わりカメラ	Rocket; RCT-024	Uzumaki Sasaki	With Mirai Hirose, Ringo Akai, Saya Namiki
2008-06-25	Women's Semen 3 女のザーメン3	Shinoda Project; SNYD-018	Yasuda Salmon	With Hotaru Akane & Asuka Kyono
2008-07-19	Splash Girl, Whale Cow 05, 10 Girls Squirting Flood! SPLASH GIRL 女鯨06 人気女優10人潮吹き大洪水！	Momotaro Squirt; DSQ-06		With Hotaru Akane, Asami, Akari Hoshino, Asuka Kyono, Megu Ayase, Nene Fujimori, Rico, Ryo Akanishi & Tomomi Takahara
2008-11-21	Tera-Dick (Real Creampie Absolute Angel) (真正中出しの絶対アングル テラちんぽ	Miruki Ipurin; AVGL-141		Winner Best Lovely / Moe Video Award 2009 AV Grand Prix
2008-11-22	Vomit Enema Ecstasy X ゲロ浣腸エクスタシー X	Dogma; AVGL-130	Tohjiro	Co-starring Mayura Hoshitsuki; Winner Digital Sales Award 2009 AV Grand Prix
2009-01-16	Non-stop Orgasm; NON STOP ORGASM ポルチオエンドルフィン 大沢佑香 性獣覚醒	Crystal-Eizou e-KISS; EKDV-023		
2009-02-05	Yuka Osawa Demonstrates Men's Squirting! 大沢佑香がもっと男の潮吹き伝授します！	Rocket; RCT-090	Uzumaki Sasaki	
2009-06-18	Magic Mirror Reverse Nanpa マジックミラー号 逆ナンパ 激烈ボディ 横浜みなとみらい編	Deep's; DVDES-192	Stephen Sotaberg	With Maria Ozawa, Natsumi Horiguchi & Risa Tsukino
2009-06-19	Restraint Chair Lesbian 拘束椅子Lbian 大沢佑香 小澤マリア	Dogma; DDT-235	TOHJIRO	With Maria Ozawa
2010-03-18	Super High Class King Game 超高級王様ゲーム	SOD; SDMT-039	Sabbath Horinaka	With Maria Ozawa, Yui Hatano, Akari Satsuki & Rio Hamasaki

=== Pink films ===
- Zoku: Shōwa Ero Roman: Ichiya no Yoromeki (続・昭和エロ浪漫 一夜のよろめき), dir. Yutaka Ikejima, OP Eiga, May 2007
- Fascinating Woman: The Temptation of Creampie, dir. Yutaka Ikejima, OP Eiga, August 2007
- Chijo Kyōshi: Mata Garinomu (痴女教師 またがり飲む), dir. Yutaka Ikejima, OP Eiga, November 2007

=== Mainstream films ===
- Yoko Namino: On Special Assignment (特命女子アナ並野容子, Tokumei joshi-ana: Namino Yōko) (2009)
- When You Love and When You Are Loved (愛するとき,愛されるとき, Aisuru toki, aisareru toki) (2010)
- Kunoichi shokei jin gōmon jigoku tabi (くノ一処刑人 拷問地獄旅) (2012)
