= V&R Planning =

Japanese pornographic film company

- Industry: Pornography
- Founded: 1986
- Founder: Kaoru Adachi
- Headquarters: Setagaya, Tokyo, Japan
- Products: Pornographic films
- Subsidiaries: V&R International; V&R Products
- Website: http://www.vandr.co.jp/index2.php

V&R Planning (V&Rプランニング, V & R Puranningu) is a Japanese film production and distribution company based in Tokyo which specializes in adult videos (AV).

== Company information ==
V&R Planning was founded in April 1986 by Kaoru Adachi (安達かおる) who had previously worked in TV, mostly as an import agent. The V&R stands for "Visual and Retail". This was a period when the VCR was becoming widely available in Japan and home viewing of movies became possible. Several other Japanese AV studios were founded about this same time including h.m.p., CineMagic, Crystal-Eizou and Alice Japan. The company started small with just two employees in a one-room Tokyo apartment and even two years later when director Company Matsuo joined the firm, he was only the fourth employee. By March 1991 V&R had moved into its own building in Tokyo's Setagaya ward and the company incorporated in May 1991.

In October 1991 director Yamashita Bakushishi (バクシーシ山下) joined V&R and started producing simulated rape videos which drew the ire of feminist groups and censors. V&R Planning had joined the voluntary censorship group Nihon Ethics of Video Association (NEVA) in May 1986 but after some of Bakushishi's videos were rejected by NEVA, V&R withdrew from membership in the organization in March 1993. Bakushishi left the company in 1996.

The most recent financial figures for V&R Planning list show a capital of 10 million yen (about $100,000) and sales revenue of 700 million yen (about $7 million). Head of the company is Susumu Saegusa (三枝 進), the real name of founder and director Kaoru Adachi. Former director Company Matsuo describes the firm as a middle-sized company in the AV world and "definitely one of the weirdest". He jokes that V&R does not stand for "Violence and Rape" as many people think.

As with other AV companies, V&R has made use of the internet for advertisement and sales. In 2003, managing director Machiki Katsumi estimated that 10% of the company income came from the internet and expected that this would become "a crucial part of this business".

=== Documentaries ===
V&R Planning doesn't only make AV - from the beginning founder Kaoru Adachi was also making documentaries. Adachi was interested in death videos and V&R distributed the Japanese versions of the US Faces of Death as Janku or Junk. About 1989, the company sent director Company Matsuo and a cameraman to Brazil to film death scenes for V&R's continuation of the Junk series. A 2001 documentary Orozco the Embalmer co-produced by V&R focused on a Colombian embalmer.

The company also produced porn director Katsuyuki Hirano's trilogy of bike-trip films. The first, Yumika, about a trip with AV Idol Yumika Hayashi, was released in 1997, followed by Encyclopedia of a Drifter (Nagaremono zukan) in 1998, and the series was completed by the award-winning 1999 account of a solo bike ride to the northern tip of Hokkaido in the midst of a blizzard, Shiro - The White.

=== V&R International ===
V&R International was formed as a subsidiary company in August 2001 with headquarters in São Paulo, Brazil to bring Japanese AV to the international market. Since it is not located in Japan, V&R International is able to offer uncensored versions of V&R products (which do not have the mosaic pixelation to obscure the genitals mandated by Japanese law) to countries outside Japan. In the United States, its products are released through the Oriental Dream label.

In January 2009, V&R International opened the website CRAZY JAPAN with a motto of "The best of Japanese hentai at your fingertips". The site provides Pay-per-view (PPV) streaming video of "extreme Japanese porn" including "amateur, scat, S&M, gay, as well as the unique Japanese phenomenon 'chikan', the art of groping young girls on crowded trains and buses".

=== V&R Products ===
V&R Products (V&Rプロダクツ, V & R Purodakutsu) was created as a V&R Planning subsidiary in August 2004 by a group of V&R Planning directors, Shingo Takemoto, Temple Suwa, Taro Kanbe and Uzumaki Sasaki who wanted more freedom of expression and the chance to pursue a less extreme course than the usual V&R Planning genres. Shingo Takemoto was the president of the new company which distributed its products through porn conglomerate Soft On Demand. In a review of one of their videos in 2006, the studio was described as another AV producer making "strange and funny genre videos like Soft On Demand".

But in 2007 when V&R Products asked for full independence, the parent company balked and Takemoto and the rest of the original staff were removed. Takemoto and the others went on to found a new AV company Rocket. The new head of V&R Products is Kaoru Yoshikawa (吉川 薫).

In August 2009, the V&R Products' website listed a total of 403 videos available from the company or about 80 videos a year produced over the firm's five-year existence.

== AV Open ==
V&R Products was one of the 16 companies invited to compete in the 2006 AV Open contest. Its entry, labeled with the production code OPEN-0653, Tokyo Shinjuku Ward Office 24: Slut Division (こちら!東京24区 痴女区の区役所の痴女○○課) directed by Uzumaki Sasaki took the 3rd Place prize in the Challenge Stage. V&R Products also entered the 2007 AV Open with the novelty video, 100 Beautiful Women Come to My House (ある朝起きたら、家に美女が100人来た！), labeled OPEN-0711.

== Labels ==
V&R has released videos under a number of labels in addition to V&R Planning, V&R Products and V&R International:

- Noah Select (from 1986)
- Noah Select Special (from 1989)
- Virgin (from 1991)
- Vogue
- Pandore
- Desire
- Ume Gold
- Cell
- MAD Video

== Directors ==
Over the more than 25 years since V&R was founded, several prominent directors have worked with the company including:

- Kaoru Adachi
- Yamashita Bakushishi (バクシーシ山下)
- Kunihiro Hasegawa
- Noboru Iguchi
- Injan Koga AKA Innjean Koga (インジャン古河)
- Company Matsuo
- Eigo Mochizuki (望月英吾)
- Temple Suwa (テンプルすわ)
- Shingo Takemoto
- TOHJIRO

== Actresses ==
Although Yumika Hayashi and Reiko Miyazaki (宮崎レイコ) made a number of early videos with V&R for directors Company Matsuo and Kaoru Adachi, because of the company's emphasis on amateurs and extreme fetishes, only a few AV Idols have worked for V&R and usually just briefly:

- Kyōko Aizome
- Yumika Hayashi
- Mariko Kawana
- Hitomi Kobayashi
- Yuri Komuro
- Reiko Miyazaki
- Anna Ohura
- Nao Saejima
- Maria Yumeno

== Series ==
Video series produced by V&R include:

- New Female Teacher Special (新・女教師スペシャル)
- Time Stop (時間よ止まれ！) - V&R Products series
