= Nozomi Momoi =

Japanese AV idol (1978–2002)

- 桃井望
- Momoi in 2000
- Born: Nozomi Momoi; September 23, 1978; Shinjuku, Tokyo, Japan
- Died: October 12, 2002 (aged 24); Shiojiri, Nagano, Japan
- Cause of death: Homicide
- Occupation: AV idol
- Height: 1.48 m (4 ft 10 in)

Nozomi Momoi (Japanese: 桃井望, Hepburn: Momoi Nozomi; September 23, 1978 – October 12, 2002) was a popular and prolific Japanese AV idol. She appeared in over 100 movies, appearing in up to ten releases per month. She was murdered at the age of 24.

== Life and career ==
=== Early life ===
Nozomi Momoi was born in Tokyo on September 23, 1978. She attended junior high school in Nagano Prefecture, and remained in touch with friends there, visiting them on vacation, for the rest of her life. Before beginning work in the AV field, Nozomi worked in what she called "a very normal job." Describing her daily routine at this time, she said, "I used to wake up at 5:30 in the morning to get ready for work and I didn't have time to put on make-up or do my hair... It was the type of job where I was alone most of the time so I didn't bother with it." She wanted a different lifestyle, and to make more money, but she was unable to decide what sort of work she wanted to do. She was in this frame of mind when she was scouted by a representative of the AV industry in Tokyo's Shinjuku neighborhood.

=== AV debut ===
When she made her AV debut in April 2001 with Dogma, AV director Tohjiro's advice to Nozomi was, "You should be a bit more perverted." Nozomi claimed that she took this advice to heart and that it helped her to be less inhibited both on screen and off. In December of her debut year, Nozomi was the star of the fourth entry in VIP studios' documentary-style Monthly series. Her January 2002 video for the Media Station Bazooka label, Virtual Brothel, had Nozomi playing the role of a young prostitute who learns the trade from the more experienced Yukari Sakurada. Viewers were invited to compare Sakurada's veteran technique with Nozomi's fresh innocence.

Nozomi enjoyed her new occupation. About her early videos, Nozomi recalled, "I was having so much fun at first that I didn't feel tired at all." Unlike many AV actresses who are happy to have time off, Nozomi became known for actively seeking out new chances to perform. In May 2002, Nozomi appeared in the third entry of the Forceful Exhibitionistic-Play Maniax video series. In this video, Nozomi and two other AV actresses engage in exhibitionistic acts at a pachinko parlor, a public park, and an office building.

=== Later career ===
Towards the end of her life, she had become tired of the rape themes and school-girl roles which were common in her videos, but she enjoyed the fact that she was getting more dominant roles in her later AVs. "Making men play along to me is something new so it's fun to do. I think that's the type of thing I want to do more of." Nozomi's July, 2002 video release Popular Actresses Fucking Virgin Boys was in this genre. As the title implied, the video had Nozomi and two other AV actresses have sex with amateur virgin males, including a college student and a middle-aged man. Her video Home Delivery Call Girl, from August 2002, worked with a similar documentary-style concept. In this case, the actress appears at a male amateur's home to perform sex with him. A posthumously-released compilation DVD released by CineMagic from 2006, entitled La Vie En Nose, includes one of Nozomi's videos from 2002. This was the first in a series of DVDs focusing on a nose fetish, indicating that Nozomi had worked in that genre also.

Nozomi continued to enjoy sex both within and outside of the AV setting, and stated that she did not mind having it every day. Nevertheless, the intense pace of her career was beginning to tire her. She had been making up to ten videos a month, and expressed fatigue with the AV work both in interviews and in private conversations. She told an interviewer, "...it was a lot of fun at first, but I'm really tired nowadays. To tell you the truth, I think I'm over-exerting myself right now. So I want to take a decent vacation rather than get paid." She continued, "Like I said before, I enjoy the shoots a lot. There are times when I think it's hard and tiring, but the fun part is a lot greater!" A friend later reported that Nozomi was planning to get married, quit the AV industry and become a stage actress. Nozomi also formed an idol musical group with some other AV idols and released a musical CD in 2002.

=== Death ===
Nozomi's career was still on the rise when her life came to a sudden end while visiting Nagano Prefecture. On October 12, 2002, she was found dead by the Narai River, which runs through Shiojiri. A nearby burned-out car contained the remains of her male companion. Nozomi had been stabbed at least six times, covered with gasoline and set on fire about 10 meters from the car. It was reported that Nozomi's companion was a company employee in Nagano Prefecture, and that in what the police called a possible murder-suicide pact, the man had burned himself to death inside the car. The remains were so badly charred that it took hours of testing before investigators could even determine that the remains belonged to a male. According to the Mainichi Shimbun, "Nozomi seemed to have something Japan's myriad other porno starlets lacked and, at just 24, she was on her way up in the world before her tragic end."

In the months after the incident, the parents of Momoi's male companion objected to the murder-suicide theory and many inconsistencies were pointed out. His parents unsuccessfully brought a case against the local police and when their insurance company refused to pay because of their son's supposed suicide, they sued Sumitomo Life Insurance. In October 2006, the civil court at Nagano ruled in favor of the parents that the two deaths were due to murder by a third party. No further progress had been made in the criminal case.

== See also ==
- List of unsolved murders (2000–present)

== Bibliography ==
- Katz, Nathalie (January 2005). "Burusera 3 (DVD review)". Adult Video News. Archived from the original on 2016-03-03.
- "Nozomi Momoi". AV Idol Directory.
- "桃井望] (Momoi Nozomi)" (in Japanese). Japanese Movie Database.
- "Momoi Nozomi Interview". www.jmate.com.
- "桃井望 (Momoi Nozomi)" (in Japanese). 'Web I-dic' (Idol Dictionary). Archived from the original on 2007-12-21.
- "Porno starlet tied to bizarre murder-suicide pact". Mainichi Shimbun. October 24, 2002.
