= Company Matsuo =

Japanese pornographic film director

- Born: June 29, 1966 (age 58); Kasugai, Aichi, Japan
- Occupation: Film director
- Years active: 1988 –

Company Matsuo (カンパニー松尾, Kanpanii Matsuo) is a Japanese adult video (AV) director, producer and entrepreneur. He is credited with popularizing the Japanese porn genre of "hamedori", where the director/actor performs sexually with the actress and also films the actual action. He has been called "a master of shooting pornography with amateurs".

== Life and career ==
Matsuo was born June 29, 1966 in Aichi Prefecture. His nickname "Company" goes back to his junior high school days when he sold box lunches to his fellow students and became known as "Company". He was interested in a TV career from his high school days and after finishing technical college he joined a music TV company. When the company went bankrupt a friend talked to him about the AV industry.

=== V&R Planning ===
Matsuo's first job in AV was with V&R Planning which had just started up in 1986. The company was small and when Matsuo joined the firm in 1988, he was only the fourth employee. He started as an Assistant but began making his own films by 1989.

V&R Planning didn't only make AV - founder Kaoru Adachi was interested in death videos and V&R distributed the Japanese versions of the US Faces of Death as Janku or Junk. About 1989, the company sent Matsuo and a cameraman to Brazil to film death scenes for V&R's continuation of the Junk series. He spent two weeks in Rio de Janeiro listening to police radio with local newsmen and filming accidents and murder scenes.

Matsuo's first films for V&R were dramas but he started working in the documentary hamedori style in 1991. Matsuo says that it was Yumika Hayashi, an AV actress at V&R at the time, who was the indirect cause of his switch to hamedori. He was having a love affair with Hayashi but the films he directed with her used professional AV actors. He felt that the more intimate hamedori technique could allow both him and the actress to show true emotion. His technique was to use amateurs, travel to their hometowns, and talk to them extensively on camera to get them to open up before any sex scenes started. His collaboration in hamedori videos with Reiko Miyazaki (宮崎レイコ), who started out as an amateur at V&R, made the director and actress well-known.

While at V&R Planning, from 1996 Matsuo also directed videos for other studios including h.m.p., Alice Japan and Cosmos Plan. Matsuo left V&R Planning amicably in 2004 to pursue other projects.

=== HMJM ===
In May 2003, Matsuo and others, including cameraman Yoshikazu Hamada, founded a new AV company, Hamada Shashin Jimusho (Hamada Picture Office), shortened to Hamajim, and now mostly called HMJM. Since 2004 Matsuo has not only directed for HMJM but has also worked at other studios including Dream Ticket, Dogma and Big Morkal.

In late 2008 and early 2009, h.m.p. issued a set of three 4-hour retrospective DVDs chronicling Matsuo's work with amateur actresses at that company. The DVDs, entitled Best Works of Company Matsuo 4 Hours (カンパニー松尾 全仕事4時間) Volumes 1, 2 & 3, were released with the thinner censorship mosaic used in newer videos.

In 2009, Matsuo appeared in a documentary by Japanese-Korean director Tetsuaki Matsue titled Annyeong Yumika (あんにょん由美香, Annyon Yumika) on Matsuo's former colleague and lover Yumika Hayashi who died in 2005 Matsuo had previously produced Matsue's 2004 documentary Identity about zainichi, ethnic Koreans living in Japan.

As part of the celebration of Shelly Fujii's three-year anniversary with KMP in November 2011, Matsuo directed one of the 4 sections of her video, Shelly Fujii 3rd Anniversary - 4 Performances With 4 Different Directors, along with K*WEST, Takuan & Hideto Aki.

== Awards ==
AV Grand Prix

- 2008 Best Amateur Video: Final Mariko (まり子 ファイナル)
- 2008 Press Award - (Tied): Final Mariko (まり子 ファイナル)
- 2009 Press Award: The Sex Cannon Ball Ride 2009 (テレクラキャノンボール2009 賞品はまり子*Gカップ)

== Sources ==
- "Company Matsuo and the World of Japanese Adult Video".
- Company Matsuo at IMDb
- "Movies by Company Matsuo".
- "Company Matsuo Filmography" (in Japanese). Archived from the original on 2009-08-15.
