= Hotaru Akane =

Japanese AV idol (1983-2016)

- 紅音 ほたる
- Born: 25 October 1983; Osaka, Japan
- Died: 15 August 2016 (aged 32)
- Other names: Anna Akizuki; Anna Syugetsu
- Height: 1.57 m (5 ft 2 in)

Hotaru Akane (Japanese: 紅音 ほたる, Hepburn: Akane Hotaru; 25 October 1983 – 15 August 2016) also known as Anna Akizuki (秋月 杏奈, Akizuki Anna) and Hotaru (ほたる) was a Japanese actress, HIV/AIDS activist, and pornographic actress. She was active in many media formats in Japan including mainstream theatrical film, and was a popular blogger. Her adeptness at female ejaculation in adult videos (AV) earned Akane the title, "Shiofuki Queen". She retired from AV work in 2008.

== Life and career ==
=== AV debut ===
Hotaru Akane was born in Osaka, Japan on 25 October 1983. Akane's early appearances were under the stage name Anna Akizuki, and she debuted in AV using this name in an ensemble performance in the February 2004 adult video (AV) Faithful Dog 'Saseko', which won the award for Best AV Title at the 5th Takeshi Kitano Awards. By June 2004, she was appearing in solo videos such as Milky Sports for the Milky Prin studio. Later that year she was performing in featured actress videos for the major studios Wanz Factory and Moodyz. The November 2004 cosplay-themed Uniform Collection / Anna Akizuki had Akane donning a variety of school uniforms, a popular form of garment fetishism in Japanese AVs. In 2005, Weekly Playboy awarded Akane the "Newcomer of the Year" title in their "AV Academy Awards". and she also won a Best Actress Award for Excellence at the 2006 SOD Awards.

Kuki's January 2006 release, Cutie Clips, gave the viewer the experience of having a "virtual love story" with several top AV actresses. Akane's segment is a "virtual date" at the beach. Akane performed in the September 2006 ensemble work Dream School 10 from Moodyz which took 2nd Place in the 2006 AV Open competition. She also took part in another multiple actress video, Special Galactic All-Stars, from Real Works which won a Special Prize at the same contest.

Also in September 2006, Akane appeared in her first "uncensored" video, without the mosaic pixellation which is used to disguise the genitals in most Japanese porn films. She subsequently made four more original uncensored videos, all released by Sky High Entertainment.

Akane also had a role in director Toru Ichikawa's mainstream action film, Sekiryū no onna (赤龍の女), (The Legend of Red Dragon) which was released to theaters in October 2006.

=== The "Shiofuki Queen" ===
For her ability to perform shiofuki or female ejaculation, Akane became known as the "Shiofuki Queen" of Japanese adult videos. Videos focusing on this talent include such titles as the December 2004 Hotaru Akane - Shiofuki Climax and Hotaru Akane - Paipan Mega Shiofuki Fuck from December 2007. Akane says that she prepares for her shiofuki demonstrations by drinking an entire bottle of water before performing in these scenes. In the June 2006 Hotaru Akane and Ayano Murasaki: Splash Heaven, the plot of the video has Akane competing with top jukujo or "mature" actress, Ayano Murasaki in this area of specialty in a contest to decide "Who is the best squirter in the AV industry". Love Splashing, released the following month, was a shiofuki-themed omnibus collection grouping Akane with such notable practitioners of the technique as Ai Kurosawa. In January 2007, Akane was chosen to be the actress in the inaugural entry of the new Ultimate Ecstasy series on the Real Works label.

She appeared in three Interracial videos in early 2007; Bring It On Denma Black Dude in January, Gal Dancer Black Dude Nakadashi in February, and Black Group Fuck in March with two other AV idols.

Akane has said that she takes pride in her career as an AV idol, and her January 2007 video, Gals' Battle Royal ～Hotaru Kurenai X Chihiro Shina～, makes a theme of that professionalism. The plot of the video has two accomplished AV performers trying to outdo each other in a competition of sexual acts. Practices employed in the contest include fellatio, paizuri and urination. The video was re-released in Blu-ray format in July. A similar competition-themed video was Versus, Hotaru Akane vs. Satoko Tachibana, which pitted Akane against another top AV idol in a competition over who is the most skilled erotic performer. Magic Mirror The Two-way Mirror Car; Hot Body In Yokohama follows the exploits of four AV idols, Akane and Hikari Hino among them, cruising the streets of Yokohama picking up amateur men with whom to frolic in a specially-equipped car. In Hotaru Akane and Misaki Aso Versus 40-Year-Old Virgins from September 2007, the fictional plot has Akane team with fellow AV idol Misaki Aso to give a group of sexually inexperienced males their first intimate encounters with the opposite sex.

At the 2007 AV Open, Akane's June 2007 video Anal Splash Thick Lesbian United! for Cross with Chihiro Hara and Sakura Sakurada won First Place in the "Challenge Stage" section and also took the Lily Franky Honorary President Prize.

=== Retirement and later career ===
Akane retired from AV activities in 2008 and released her retirement video Final Gusher - Akane Hotaru's Retirement Work with Cross in October 2008 but kept her blog open until August 2009. In an interview given after her retirement, Akane said that AV actresses were better treated by management when she began her career (in 2004) and were now being treated like commodities. Her advice to newcomers to the industry was to set goals and keep control of your own body.

In November 2008, Akane played the role of a pretentious celebrity in director Kazunori Kitasaki's mainstream action thriller Triangle Connection (トラ・コネ ～Triangle Connection～). Earlier that year, she also acted in the TV Asahi television movie special Mission Section Chief Hitoshi Tadano Special '08 (特命係長 只野仁 スペシャル'０８) broadcast in February 2008 and based on the manga and TV drama Tokumei Kakarichō Tadano Hitoshi.

In March 2008, Akane made her debut as a singer in a celebrity compilation CD titled Mero Raba (Melodic Lover) targeted at a female audience. She provided the lyrics for the song she sings: Ai no Kuni. Other contributors to the CD include fashion models and popular singer TSUKASA; Akane was the only AV actress included. She has also appeared irregularly on the popular gal fashion magazine Koakuma Ageha as a model. In December 2008 when the magazine's musical compilation album Koakuma Magic (小悪魔magic) was released, she was featured with her vocal track Mikazuki (lit. "crescent") (三日月).

Unlike many other adult video actresses who carefully guard their private lives, Akane has kept a fairly high public profile. In addition to her AV appearances, Akane has become known as a popular blogger. Her frank blog, "Hotaru's Life," quickly achieved a high blog-ranking, which it has continuously maintained. Akane also has an account on the Chinese Twitter-like site Sina Weibo and in September 2012, she created a stir with a posting addressing the Senkaku Islands dispute stating "From a historical point of view, the Senkaku Islands belong to China." The response in China was overwhelmingly positive but Akane's agent later published a clarification saying that while Akane wished the dispute to be settled peacefully, it was her translator who had added the controversial line.

=== HIV/AIDS activist ===
As a high-profile celebrity in the sex industry, Akane was invited to speak at a World AIDS Day event in Tokyo's Shibuya Ward on 1 December 2007. When asked in an interview why she became involved in AIDS awareness, Akane said that she had been approached by a female student at Waseda University who asked for advice on sexual matters after a lecture that Akane had given there at an AIDS awareness event. This made her feel that she had a responsibility to young people who looked up to her as an actress, and as a result, she started working in public awareness programs to promote safe sex and HIV screening. She has also said that she was inspired by the example of Ai Iijima who devoted the last years of her life to AIDS prevention.

Akane's efforts have extended outside Japan, she became a Red Ribbon Ambassador for the Taiwan AIDS Foundation and in December 2010 she traveled to Shanghai to start an AIDS prevention campaign "Take Action", which included passing out condoms to people in the street. She also donated 5000 condoms to a Shanghai organization dedicated to preventing sexually transmitted diseases. In June 2012, the Taiwan online news service NowNews ran an article on the Top Ten Japanese AV Idols from a Taiwanese perspective. Akane was listed as number one in their selection and her AIDS work in Taiwan was detailed.

Akane and other Japanese AV stars (especially Sora Aoi) have a large popular following in China and Akane was invited as a guest to speak to a class on Sexology at Central China Normal University in Wuhan, China in March 2012. However, when thousands of students said online that they intended to attend the lecture, it was canceled because of security concerns. When Akane arrived in Wuhan on March 1, she gave her talk on local television instead of at the university.

=== Death ===
Akane was found collapsed at home on August 15, 2016. Suicide and foul play have been ruled out as potential causes. Her manager stated that she had been suffering from a severe cough, and there was evidence that she had smoked a cigarette shortly before her death. Her death is believed to have resulted from suffocation due to an acute asthma attack.

== Filmography ==
=== Movies ===
- Sekiryū no onna (赤龍の女) (2006)
- Triangle Connection (トラ・コネ ～Triangle Connection～) (2008)

== Sources ==
- "紅音ほたる(Hotaru Akane)" (in Japanese). Skyhigh Entertainment. Archived from the original on 2010-11-07.
- "Akizuki(Anna Akizuki)". AV Idol Directory.
- "人気AV女優・紅音ほたる、700人の早大生に「性教育」 (Popular AV Actress, Hotaru Akane, 700 People... "Sex Education")" (in Japanese). news.livedoor.com. 2007-11-30. Archived from the original on 2008-05-04.
- 紅音ほたる、エイズ問題「女の子も性に関心持って」 (in Japanese). ohmynews.co.jp. 2008-04-17. Archived from the original on 2008-05-04.
- "「AVのマネしないで」AV女優・紅音ほたるが呼びかけ" (in Japanese). news.livedoor.com. 2007-12-07. Archived from the original on 2008-05-01.
- "「世界エイズデー」渋谷が赤く染まる (World AIDS Day...)" (in Japanese). news.livedoor.com. 2007-12-03. Archived from the original on 2008-05-04.
- ハテナ芸人 (in Japanese). www.ntv.co.jp/hatena. 2007-12-03. Archived from the original on 2008-05-17. (Interview)
- Mr. Pig (2007-07-25). "15 Interesting Facts about Hotaru Akane". sweatpig.com. Archived from the original on 2008-04-09. (Translation of the interview above)
