= AV idol =

Japanese pornographic actress

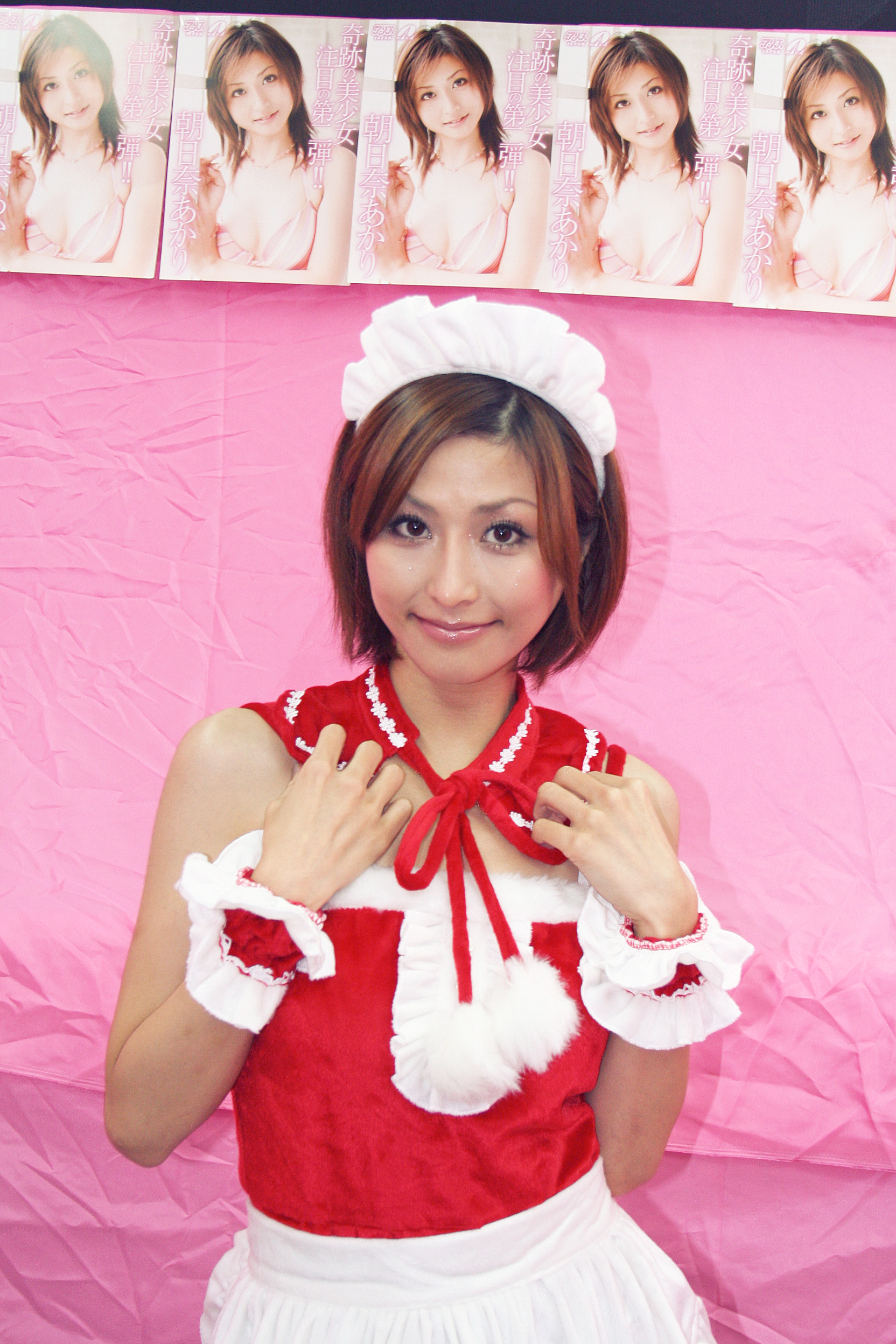
AV idol Akari Asahina, posing at an autograph-signing event in Kobe

An AV idol (AVアイドル, Ēbui aidoru; short for adult video idol) or AV actress (AV女優, Ēbui joyū) is a type of pornographic film actress in Japan. It is a sub-category of the idol culture in Japanese pop entertainment. AV idols work in the pornographic business, often both as actresses as well as models, as the video performances vary widely, from suggestive softcore imagery to hardcore pornography. The industry is noted for having frequent turnovers; since the dawn of the AV industry in the early 1980s, hundreds of AV idols have debuted every year, with an average career span of about a year, appearing in five or ten videos during that time. Some successful AV idols move into daytime television or other fields after their careers have waned, while the reverse can happen as well, where actresses move into pornographic videos if their normal work has dried up. Some AV idols have garnered a substantial following outside Japan, resulting in some of their content being subtitled into other languages.

== AV industry in Japan ==
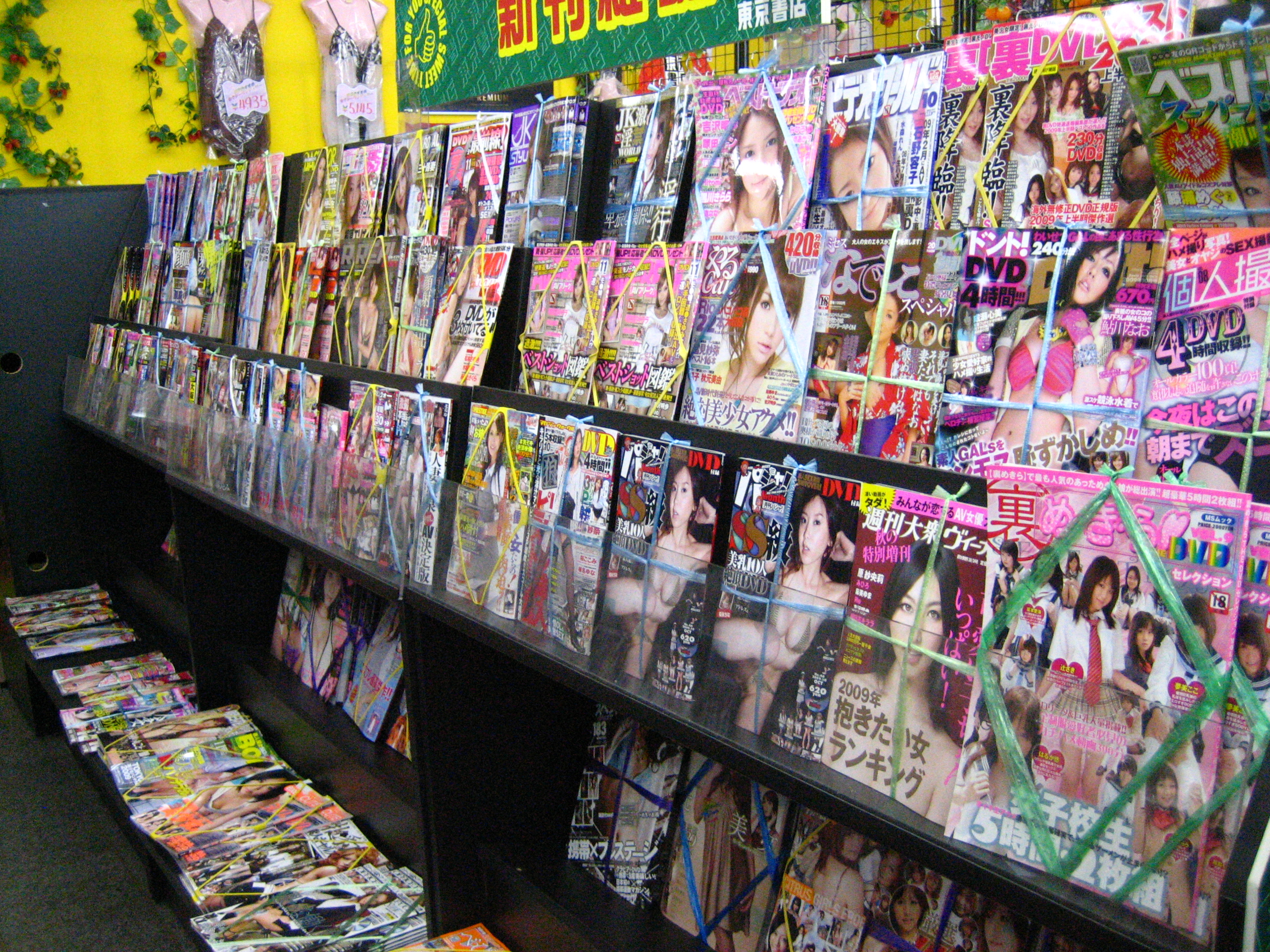
Pornographic magazines on shelves in Japan

In Japan, a celebrity may appear in AVs after already having established a career in mainstream television. It is not rare for a popular AV actress to go on to become a mainstream celebrity.

The AV, or "Adult Video" market, is a major industry in Japan, reportedly worth about ¥400 billion ($4 billion) per year. In 1992, it was reported that over 11 AVs were being made every day by over 70 production companies in Tokyo alone. The AV market was estimated to make up about 30 percent of Japan's video rentals. It was estimated in 1994 that, between legal and illegal videos, around 14,000 AVs a year were being made in the country, in contrast to about 2,500 in the United States. In an English language interview in 2011, AV idol Azusa Maki estimated that as many as 10,000 girls attempt to get into the Japanese AV industry each year.

== AV actresses ==
AV performers were often struggling actresses who could not find work in the theatrical Roman Porno films and girls from the soaplands. AV star Kaoru Kuroki has been credited with raising the status of AV idols in the public's eye. According to cultural essayist Rosemary Iwamura, "She didn't seem to be making videos because of a lack of options but rather as an informed choice."

AV actresses are usually recruited by scouts in Tokyo neighborhoods such as Roppongi, Shinjuku, and Matahine. These scouts are affiliated with talent agencies that then hire actresses for AV production companies. Some women wishing to appear in AVs apply to production companies, but they are usually referred to talent agencies. The production companies are typically charged ¥1.5 million (US$15,000) or more for an actress to appear in a video. AV actresses make between ¥200,000 and 4 million yen per video. Steve Scott, president of Third World Media, an importer of Japanese adult movies to the United States, estimated a top-tier AV star could make up to nearly ¥36 million for an eight-picture deal.

AV fans are invited to follow the progress of a prominent AV actress's career over several video appearances. In her AV debut video, the actress is introduced as a "new face," and her inexperience is played up in interviews preceding the modeling and sex scenes. Following this debut video, the AV audience follows the actress's journey through sexual awakening, and her eventual specialization, after about five AV appearances, in a specific genre such as lesbianism or SM. Once the actress has established herself as a mature AV star, she has the options of continuing into less mainstream AV genres, retiring, or, sometimes, re-emerging under a new name as a "new face."

In 2022, the Japanese government passed a new law that lowered the legal age to perform pornography to 18. The new set of laws also aims to protect actors who were pressured into entering the industry, by giving them the right to prohibit the sale of videos in which they appear after five years from the initial release date.

== Types ==
The author Nicholas Bornoff identifies some Japanese AV stereotypes as

...the prim Office Lady, the virgin-next-door, the randy farm girl, the leotarded aerobics enthusiast, the sexy predator in the hot-spring resort and ... the self-assertive slut who is put in her place by being gang-banged on the floor of the cutting room.

AV director "Tarzan" Yagi says that a successful AV actress should fit a stereotype that "can be identified at a glance, making it easier for viewers to recognize the type they prefer." Yagi mentions "the 'slender' type, 'Lolita' type, 'buxom' type and so on."

Some major AV types include:

=== Schoolgirl (Joshikōsei) ===
The depiction of the ‘kawaii’ high school student—innocent-looking but sexually suggestive—is linked to the JK business (compensated dating with adolescent girls), which is marketed to adult men.[1] AV idols with this image are numerous and frequently changing, though most performers are 18 years or older.

=== Busty (Bakunyū) ===
While a few early AV idols such as Kyoko Nakamura and Eri Kikuchi established careers due primarily to large breasts, Noriyuki Adachi sets Kimiko Matsuzaka's 1989 debut as the point at which the "Big Bust Boom" (巨乳ブーム - Kyonyu Boom) began. A string of big-bust AV idols followed, including Hitomi Tanaka, Fuko, Miki Sawaguchi, Mariko Morikawa, Rin Aoki, Nozomi Momoi and Anna Ohura. By the mid-1990s, the Big Bust genre had become a staple of the AV industry.

=== Mature (Jukujo) ===
The vast majority of AV actresses debut in their late teens, but in the mid-1990s a trend for "mature women" became evident. While youth remained the norm, the broadening in tastes led to "mature" AV stars like Aki Tomosaki in 2000, Asuka Yūki in 2005 and Maki Tomoda in 2006, all of whom had passed their 30th birthdays at the time of their debuts. These actresses became popular in AVs with an incest theme. Yoko Shimada, the international actress, did AV with TEK-032 and TEK-034 sold on R18.com, a former channel that specialised in AV films.

== See also ==
- Chronology of adult videos in Japan
- Pornography in Japan
- Hokutu Corporation
- Gravure idol

== Sources ==
- Adachi, Noriyuki (1992). アダルトな人びと - Adaruto na Hitobito ("Adult" People) (in Japanese). Tokyo: Kodansha. ISBN 4-06-205546-5.
- Bornoff, Nicholas (1994) [1991]. "18 (Naked Dissent)". Pink Samurai: An Erotic Exploration of Japanese Society; The Pursuit and Politics of Sex in Japan (Paperback ed.). London: HarperCollins. pp. 589–621. ISBN 0-586-20576-4.
- b-v.co.jp AV Idol Interviews (Japanese)
- AV Idol
- Fornander, Kjell (July 1992). "A Star is Porn". Tokyo Journal.
