= Hibiki Ōtsuki =

Japanese AV idol (born 1988)

- 大槻 ひびき
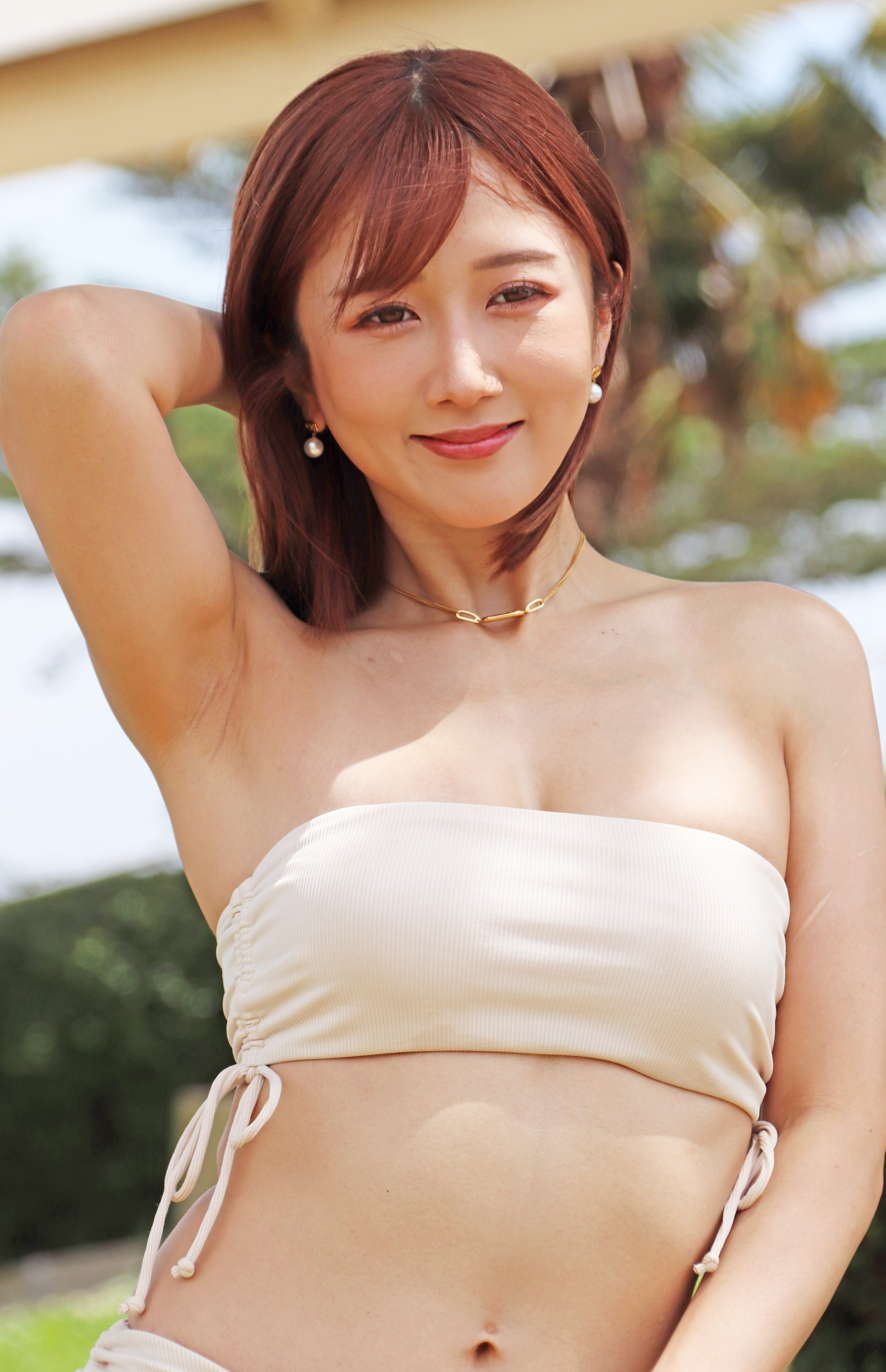
- Ōtsuki in 2023
- Born: February 21, 1988 (age 38); Otaru, Hokkaido, Japan
- Other name: Hibiyan
- Occupation: Adult actress
- Years active: 2008–present

Hibiki Ōtsuki (Japanese: 大槻 ひびき) is a Japanese AV actress and an idol singer. Active since 2008, Otsuki became one of the AV industry's most well-known and prolific performers with more than 2100 credited AV appearances. Currently represented by the AV agency T-Powers, she is also a member of the idol group T♡Project.

== Life and career ==
Otsuki was born in Otaru, Hokkaido on February 21, 1988. She had her first AV shoot in July 2008 and debuted three months later in October 2008. She first appeared in an amateur pick-up (nanpa) AV titled Gyaruma Nanpahame MAX Vol.2 and had her first credited AV appearance in Dirty Amateur Series - Sweating When On Camera Hibiki Otsuki released on October 17, 2008 under the Ran Maru label. During her first years in the industry Otsuki was a "project actress" (kikaku joyū) with no exclusive contract to a major AV talent agency or studio, leaving her to either work with small, independent production companies or to play small and sometimes even uncredited roles in ensemble productions.

Otsuki herself remarked her early years "difficult", as she struggled to find good roles and often contemplated retirement. In an interview she said she mostly kept going by the encouragement of her small but loyal fan base and her own determination to get to the top of the industry. Eventually she managed to work with more well-known AV companies like Wanz Factory or REAL Works. Originally she had a gyaru ('gal') style with dyed brown-blonde hair, tanned skin and heavy make-up but around late 2011 she began to transition into a more natural look with glossy black hair and less make-up.

Otsuki's consistency, work ethic, professionalism and willingness of not shying away from the more extreme side of the industry (including S&M, simulated rape and even urolagnia) has gained her a growing popularity and acclaim, and by 2012 she was working with the more prominent porn studios of Japan like Moodyz or Soft On Demand. In 2013 she won two awards at the Adult Broadcasting Awards and 4th place for Best Actress at the Pink Film Award. She won the Best Actress Awards next year at the Pink Film Awards. By 2014, Otsuki became one of the industry's most reliable and acclaimed performers, collaborating with famous AV actresses like Ayu Sakurai, Saki Hatsumi, Ai Uehara, Ayaka Tomoda and many others. In 2014 she also had her V-Cinema debut in the action thriller Assassin Maria.

In 2015 she appeared as herself in the video game Yakuza 0, providing her voice and likeness.

She also formed a close relationship with famous AV idol Yui Hatano. Their duo and friendly rivalry (known as HibiHata) became quite known in the industry as they co-starred in many films since their first collaboration.

On May 13, 2016, she won the Best Actress Award at the 2016 DMM Adult Awards which she called a major turning point that motived her to continue her AV career. In August 2016, along with Yui Hatano and Ruka Kanae, she became a member of T♡Project an idol group that specializes in Anime and Vocaloid songs. As of 2021, Otsuki is represented by T-Powers agency, and continues to perform with numerous companies.

== Personal life ==
- Her hobbies are snowboarding, shopping, falling asleep after waking up, making Wagashi, and skateboarding.
- Her skills include playing the piano.
- She has a long tongue (8.5 cm).
- She is known for her ability of squirting (female ejaculation), a technique she learned by herself through practice.

== Awards ==
Year	Ceremony	Award	Work	Co-winners
2013	Adult Broadcasting Awards	Tokyo Sports Award	—N/a	—N/a
2013	Pink Film Award	Best Actress: 4th Place	Onedari kyôen: Shikijô yûrei	—N/a
2014	Pink Film Award	Best Actress	In dream: Madoromu hakui	—N/a
2016	DMM.R18 Adult Award	Best Actress	—N/a	—N/a
