= Otonashi =

Otonashi (written: 音無 lit. "soundless") is a family name in the Japanese language and may refer to:

== People ==
- Hidetaka Otonashi, Japanese horse race trainer
- Hidetaki Otonashi, Japanese horse race trainer
- Kyosuke Otonashi, Japanese manga artist
- Mikiko Otonashi, Japanese actress
- Ryunosuke Otonashi, a Japanese anime director
- Tamae Otonashi, Japanese film producer

== Fictional characters ==
- Akari Otonashi, one of the supporting characters in the visual novel Kurenai no Tsuki
- Ayana Otonashi, one of the supporting characters in the visual novel Wonderful Everyday
- Etsuko Otonashi, one of the supporting characters in the video game Umamusume: Pretty Derby
- Fumiko Otonashi, one of the supporting characters in the anime television series Battle Spirits: Shounen Toppa Bashin
- Haruna Otonashi, a character in the video game series Inazuma Eleven
- Io Otonashi, the main character in the manga series Place to Place
- Kaguya Otonashi, one of the main character in the light novel series Magika no Kenshi to Shoukan Maou
- Kaori Otonashi, one of the supporting characters in the Japanese adult video series, portrayed by a former pornographic (AV) actress Ayu Sakurai
- Kazusa Otonashi, one of the supporting characters in the manga series Descendants of Darkness
- Kiruko Otonashi, the main character in the manga series Shinmai Fukei Kiruko-san
- Kotori Otonashi, one of the supporting characters in the video game series The Idolmaster
- Kurumi Otonashi, one of the supporting characters in the Japanese adult video Silent Molestation
- Kyoko Otonashi, the main character in the manga series Maison Ikkoku
  - Ikuko Otonashi, one of the supporting characters in the manga series Maison Ikkoku
  - Soichiro Otonashi, one of the supporting characters in the manga series Maison Ikkoku
- Kyosuke Otonashi, one of the supporting characters in the video game series Kunio-kun
- Maria "Aya" Otonashi, one of the main character in the light novel series The Empty Box and Zeroth Maria
- Meimi Otonashi, one of the main character in the eroge visual novel series Djibril – The Devil Angel
- Meru Otonashi, one of the supporting characters in the anime series Sayonara, Zetsubou-Sensei
- Miki Otonashi, one of the supporting characters in the original video animation Koutetsu no Majo Annerose
- Miyuki Otonashi, the main character in the Japanese film Godzilla: Final Wars
  - Anna Otonashi, one of the supporting characters in the Japanese film Godzilla: Final Wars
- Otonashi, one of the supporting characters in the anime television series Kiteretsu Daihyakka
- Rei Otonashi, one of the supporting characters in the anime television series The World of Narue
- Rinko Otonashi, one of the supporting characters in the manga series Lucky Star
- Ryoko Otonashi, the main character in the light novel Danganronpa/Zero
- San Otonashi, one of the supporting characters in the manga series Rosario + Vampire
- Saya Otonashi, the main character in the anime television series Blood+
- Shizuo Otonashi, one of the supporting characters in the Japanese television drama series Sekai Ichi Muzukashii Koi
- Tsukiko Otonashi, one of the supporting characters in the Japanese television drama series I Love Tokyo Legend – Kawaii Detective
- Yumihiko Otonashi, one of the supporting characters in the anime television series Concrete Revolutio
- Yukari Otonashi, one of the supporting characters in the anime television series The Rolling Girls
- Yura Otonashi, one of the supporting characters in the manga series Gakuen Alice
- Yuzuru Otonashi, the main character in the anime television series Angel Beats!
  - Hatsune Otonashi, one of the supporting characters in the anime television series Angel Beats!
- Zakuro Otonashi, one of the supporting characters in the anime television series Qualidea Code

== See also ==
- Kirawa re Kansatsu-kan Otonashi Ichi Roku: Keisatsu Naibu Chōsa no Oni, Japanese television drama series
- Otonashī Jimi-ko ni Naka-dashi 15 Ayu, a Japanese adult video
- Osorubeshi!!! Otonashi Karen-san (おそるべしっっ!!!音無可憐さん), a Japanese television drama series
- Otonashi Kawa, a Japanese musical unit consisting of Ryo Shoji (lyrist), Kobayashi (composer) and Takekawa (arranger)
- Otonashi River in Tanabe, Wakayama, Japan
- Otonashi Shinsui Park in Tokyo, Japan
- Sanjūsan go sha otonashi (33号車応答なし), a Japanese film
