= Ayu Sakurai =

Japanese former AV idol (born 1991)

- 桜井 あゆ
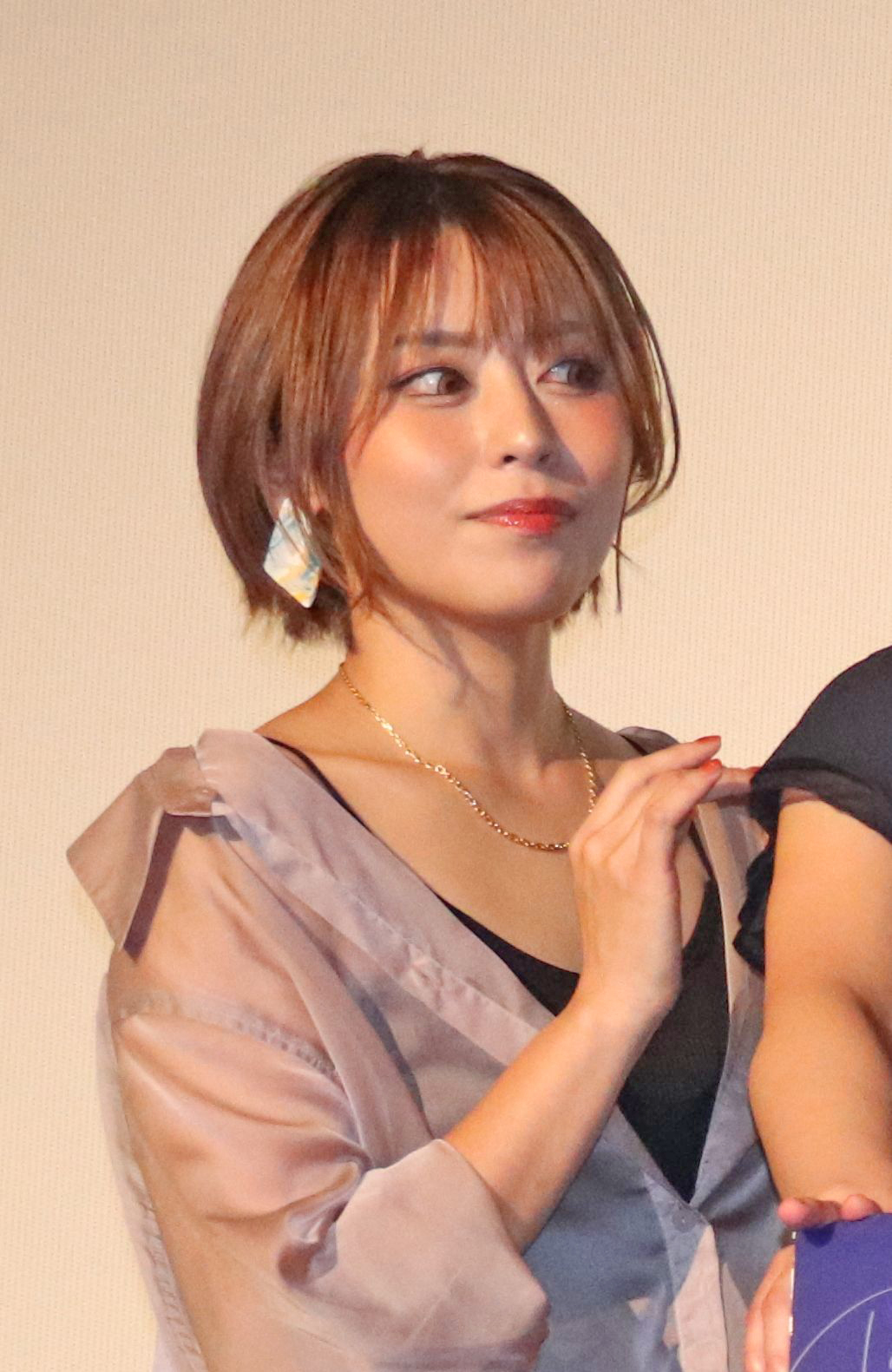
- Sakurai in 2023
- Born: 15 April 1991 (age 35); Miyazaki Prefecture, Japan
- Other names: Haruki Kato; Sayu Aikura; Yoshimi Sakurai
- Years active: 2013–2016
- Agent: Million
- Known for: Million Girls Z member; theatre work
- Height: 162 cm (5 ft 4 in)
- Awards: Adult Broadcasting Awards 2016 Cyzo Prize

Ayu Sakurai (桜井 あゆ, Sakurai Ayu; born 15 April 1991) is a former pornographic (AV) actress and current non-pornographic actress. She was born in Miyazaki Prefecture. Her agency is T-Powers.

== Personality ==
Ayu Sakurai was born on April 15, 1991, in Miyazaki Prefecture, Japan. Sakurai made her AV debut after being scouted while living in the Osaka Prefecture. She calls herself a "chippai actress" and touted her small bust as an appealing point. Sakurai has reported that she never wanted to stay in AV productions and had long been seeking to make the transition to non-pornographic media while working in the adult film industry.

She made her breakthrough in the AV industry while working as an independent actress or "Kikatan" (an AV actress not tied to any one production company) in 2014. Her success lead to her signing a contract as an exclusive actress (a popular AV actress signed to one company) in September 2015 where she would appear in 200 productions. Her total number of releases, including omnibus etc., before leaving the AV industry reached over 800.

After retirement as an AV actress, she worked under the stage name Yoshimi Sakurai (桜井よしみ, Sakurai Yoshimi) for some years and has changed her name back to Ayu Sakurai.

== Career ==
She made her AV debut from Prestige in March 2013, holding her first photo session. On November, she won in the female department of the signboard model general election held at "Mirupoke" Kansai version, a job site for sex industry and AV actresses.

In April 2014, she was nominated only for Kikatan actress at the DMM Adult Award Best Rookie Award, but did not win. In August, she won the 13th place in the sexy actress popularity vote which appeared as a character of Yakuza 0 and won the cast right. She participated in Japan Adult Expo in November. On December, she appeared, along with Ai Uehara, Kitagawa Erika, etc. in the Asian Adult Expo (AAE) in Macau as Chinese: 櫻井步; pinyin: Yīngjǐng Bù. In the Weekly Asahi Geinō AV Grand Award 2014 Actress category, she won the Excellent Actress award along with Minami Kojima and Aika Yumeno. She held her first off-line party. In DM14.R18's annual AV actress ranking in 2014, she played the top 10 in all three sectors.

In February 2015, she joined Million Girls Z (Rika Hoshimi, Kizuna Sakura, Ayaka Tomoda, Ichika Ayamori, Anju Mizushima, hereafter MGZ). In March, in commemoration of Tsutaya Adult opening, she was inaugurated as monthly store manager with Chika Arimura, Saki Hatsumi, Ayaka Tomoda, and Rika Hoshimi. She later made her first appearance at a direct-to-video release. In April, she appeared at MGZ's first terrestrial regular programme (Kakkokari) TV. which started at Tokyo MX. She also appeared in the Shanghai AAE 2015 with Julia and Saki Kozai. She became an exclusive to Million on May. On July, MGZ made their major debut with "I ♥ MGZ". She appeared in a Shanghai event in August with Ai Uehara, Rola Misaki, and Kaede Fuyutsuki. She earned MVP at the Sky Perfect Swimming Tournament of the 1st Sexy Actress Darake! Million Girls Z later won Best Performance Award at the "Sexy Idol Music Festa 2015". In November, in the "MGZ Asia Tour 2015 'Hatsukoi'" in Guangzhou, Macau, China, in which the first single live performance of MGZ started. On December, she received the 2015 Promotion Award at the KMP Award held in Macau.

In February 2016, she graduated from the exclusive Million and returned to Kikatan actress. On March, she graduated from MGZ. She received the Cyzo Prize at Adult Broadcasting Awards 2016. And as she declared for a long time, she retired from the AV industry in three years. On April, she released a retirement memorial work. In May, although after retirement, she appeared in the column gravure of the monthly Cyzo 6th month of the Cyzo prize reception commemoration project. Although she was returning to civilian life, in December, she appeared in the name of yoshimi at "MGZ Last Gigs". In addition, under the invitation of the stage appearance, she appeared in the stage name Yoshimi Sakurai.

In January 2017, she received an offer for an overseas event, and participated in "Men's Show 2017 South Korea" under the name Ayu Sakurai.

Major rankings of AV actress in DMM.R18
Period	Video distribution					Mail order				Rental		
Period	2013	2014	2015	2016	2017	2013	2014	2015	2016	2013	2014	2015
First half	-	-	6	10	41	-	6	17	86	-	11	13
Second half	-	7	7	16	-	-	11	-	-	-	7	36
Yearly	-	9	7	16	51	70	8	56	-	94	6	21

Stand alone piece of DMM.R18's major ranking prize winning work
Year	Title of work	Department	Duration/rank
2013	Watashi, Setsunai ndesu...Hitozuma Ayu Sakurai 24-sai	Video distribution	41st second half 64th yearly
2013	Watashi, Setsunai ndesu...Hitozuma Ayu Sakurai 24-sai	Rental	52nd second half 73rd yearly
2014	Watashi, Setsunai ndesu...Hitozuma Ayu Sakurai 24-sai	Video distribution	43rd first half
2014	Watashi, Setsunai ndesu...Hitozuma Ayu Sakurai 24-sai	Rental	33rd first half 79th yearly
2015
2015	Oshaburi Yobikō 47	Mail order	73rd first half 45th yearly

== Filmography ==
=== Television ===
2014–16

2014

- OV Kantoku (21 Jul, CX) Co-stars: Nana Ninomiya, Kokoa Aisu
- Buki wa TV. SMAP×FNS 27-jikan TV (27 Jul, CX)
  - Sanma Nakai no Konya mo Nemurenai: Zettai ni Honey Trap o Lakenai Sexy Joyū-san no Keitai Bangō o Getto shiyo! No Corner; Co-stars: Takuya Kimura, Daijiro Enami (Fuji TV announcer), Saki Hatsumi, Haruki Sato, Ayaka Tomoda, Iori Kogawa, Nao Mizuki, Nana Ninomiya, Chika Arimura
- 12th SkyPerfecTV! Presents Stop! AIDS Charity 24-Jikan TV Ero wa Chikyū o Sukuu! (30–31 Aug, BS Sky PerfecTV! Sky Channel 5)
  - Playboy Channel HD Ichioshi actress; Co-stars: Saki Hatsumi, Saki Miizumi, Hina Sakurasaku, Yu Shinoda, Kizuna Sakura, Miku Abeno, Nanami Kawakami, Marshmallow3D, Moe Kazama, Yui Fujishima, Mai Usami, Mei Hayama, Arina Sakita, Ami Unano, Nozomu Anaki, Sayumi Kojima, Yuri Sato

2015

- (Kakkokari) TV (7 Apr – 29 Sep, Tokyo MX1) Co-stars: Jungle Pocket, Kokomi Naruse, MGZ
- BS SkyPerfecTV! Purimen & Sexy Joyū datte Chikyū o Sukutchau zo! 5-Jikan SP (22 Aug, BS Sky PerfecTV!)
  - 1st Sexy actress Darake! SKY PerfecTV! Swimming Competition Part 2*kmp Channel representative; Co-stars: Miku Abeno, Nana Ayano, Mai Usami, Mio Kimio, Saki Kosai, Minami Kojima, Ayane Ryokawa, Saki Hatsumi, Mayu Minami, etc.
- Sexy-J Summer Festival (5 Sep, Enta!579) Co-stars: Minami Kojima, Mana Sakura, Rina Rukawa, Marina Shiraishi, Moe Tenshi, Erina Nagasawa, Riri Kuribayashi, Kaho Shibuya, Ayumi Kimito, Saki Kosai, Miki Sunohara, Tsubasa Amami, Shunhate Ayami, Yuko Shiraki, Ryomi Yamatohime, Kühn, Marshmallow3D+, me-me*, MGZ, Mihiro
- Summers no Kamigitoi (21 Nov, CX) Co-stars: Yume Ayanami, Mai Uchiyama, Ruka Kanae, Erika Kitagawa, Iori Kogawa, Yuki Kami, Miki Sunohara, Nanako Tsukishima, Rika Hoshimi
- Moteru no Hōsoku (4 Dec, Nagoya TV Next) season4 #3; Co-star: Harumi Tachibana
- Sweet Angel (4 Dec, Mondo TV) #61
- 13th SkyPerfecTV! Presents Stop! AIDS Charity 24-Jikan TV Ero wa Chikyū o Sukuu! Ai tte, Gamanda.
  - Oppai o Minai oppai Bokin Co-stars: Nanako Tsukushima, Ayumi Shinoda
  - Namade Paipai moma sete (5–6 Dec, BS SkyPerfecTV! Sky Channel 5) Co-stars: Kunihiro Matsumura, Yamazaki Motors, Doborokku, Mana Sakura, Miori Hara, Mai Tamaki, Miho Torino, Mai Miori, Yume Ayanami, Nana Ayano, Shinobu Igarashi, Natsuko Kayama, Hina Kinami, Minami Kojima, Hikaru Konno, Ayane Ryokawa, Iroha Narumiya, Saki Hatsumi, Mao Hamasaki, China Matsuoka, Saki Miizumi, Kana Yua*Appeared as an Adult Broadcasting Award 2016 Nomination Actress
- Sexy Idol Music Festa 2015 (7, 9 Dec, Nagoya TV Next) Co-stars: Aki Yoshizawa, Stylish Heart, SIMF2015 Opening Member, Lovely Pops, Kühn, Shinsei Pinkey, MGZ, etc.

2016

- 12th Adult Broadcasting Awards (8 Mar, BS Sky PerfecTV!)
- Adult Broadcasting Awards 2016: Kandō no Butaiura mo Dai Kōkai! (17 Mar, Enta!959)

=== Internet ===
Videos, chat, deliveries

※Including paid sites.

- Peach Movie
- Ane One Style
- Get Movie
- Nylon

Panty Stocking Play Video "Pantyhose Leg Blame"
- 520 (5 May 2014)
- 521 (7 May 2014)
- 522 (9 May 2014)
Panty stocking image videos
- 377 (5 Sep 2014)
- 379 (12 Sep 2014)

- DMM.R18 Live Chat (20 Jul 2014 – 30 Mar 2015)
- SMM Live Chat (28 Nov 2014)
- Kindan Girl (22 Mar (21 at midnight) 2015 – 7 Feb (6 at midnight), NotTV) #76, 77, 83, 87, 91, 117, 119, 120
- Hige Danshaku Rui Yamada 53-sei no Renaissance Studio (delivered Sep 2015, Feb 2016, Bunkahōsō Podcast) SkyPerfecTV corner
- Hakase Suidobashi no Mura tto bin bin TV (26 Feb 2016, J:Com on Demand) #6; Co-stars: Hakase Suidobashi, Shimiken
- Kanzen Mi Kōkai! Ayu Sakurai to Ayaka Tomoda no W Ingo Dekoki XCity 20-shūnen omedetō Comment-tsuki (2 May 2016, XCity) Co-star: Ayaka Tomoda
Niconico Live
- Ones Factory presents
  - Gekkan Asakura Yū TV (2 Aug 2014)
- Momoiro Rotary Club Banana Tsūshin (7 May – 19 Jun 2014) #9, #13 Co-stars: Kokomi Sakura, Nana Ninomiya, Iori Kogawa
- Moodyz presents
  - Dai 3-kai Bakobasu Chūkei 12-jikan SP (15 May 2014)
  - [Day 2] Adult Expo Booth Nama Chūkei (15 Nov)
- FS.Knights Visual Jake to Nama Chūkei (4 Dec)
- MC Kaji (5 Feb 2015 – 4 Mar 2016) Co-stars: Kaji, Ayaka Tomoda, Nanami Hirose, etc.
- (AV Open 2015) Kaisai Kinen SP #2 (27 Aug) Co-stars: Ayaka Tomoda, Yume Ayanami
- [Guest wa Ayu Sakurai-san] Pachinko Slot Renai Simulation Sasutona! [Jissen Hito no Tonari wa Deru ka Uwasa o Kenshō] (28 Sep)
- Toy's Heart Presents Kinō Dare Tabeta? (4 Nov) #51
- TikTok
  - 劇団ロミオ(Theatrical Company Romeo) - short dramas
- YouTube
  - 東京宅急変(Sudden Change in Tokyo Residence) - short comedies
  - デイパーク劇場(Day Park theatre) - dramatized PR videos for coin-operated parking

=== Stage ===
- Mukenjigoku -Maboroshi no Kumo no Ito- (21–25 Dec 2016, Gekidan Full Monty) as "Shiki"
- Take (26 Feb 2017, Teratolock) guest appearance
- 199X-toshi (5–8 May, Teratolock) as "Surge"
- BPMD (18–22 Oct, High Spex Tracks Kikaku) as "Mao"
- Box-Sing –3Round– (26, 28 Oct, High Spex Tracks Kikaku) guest appearance
- Box-Sing Kansha-sai –Dream Match– (postponed, High Spex Tracks Kikaku)* MARIGOLD 〜絶望の花言葉〜（初演2018年7月4日 - 10日・再演2019年3月27日 - 4月3日、チャピロック企画）
- 遠くの空はカナダへ、近くの海は瀬戸内海（12月5日 - 9日、しみくれ）
- Gong of Blossomeday〜開花のゴングが鳴り響く〜（2019年5月28日 - 6月2日、AWGプロデュース）「ゆかり」役
- TOKYO ARUYO（2019年5月、スカンクランチャー）as Customer
- Meat Sause no Kakushiaji（June 27–30, 2019、フライドBALL企画）
- Yasashii Akuma（August 28 - September 1, 2019, Rhythm Collection）as Sister
- Damo Cry（December 11–17, 2019、三栄町LIVE）
- Kyoyu(kari)、2 Romm(kari)（March 19–23, 2020、しみくれ）
- Datenshi wa Usui Hon o Tojite 2020（April 30 - March 10, 2020, E-Stage Topia）
- Zurui Yatsu hodo Yoku Hoeru（March 5–9, 2025, Kozuhiro Produce）

=== Film ===
- Blue Porno / Tokyo Gate Bridge（September 1, 2023. Left High. a R15+ film）as Ayu Sakurai

=== Video game ===
- Yakuza 0 (2015) as Ayu, a timid young woman aspiring to become a dominatrix
