= Mana Sakura =

Japanese AV idol, gravure model, and novelist

- 紗倉まな
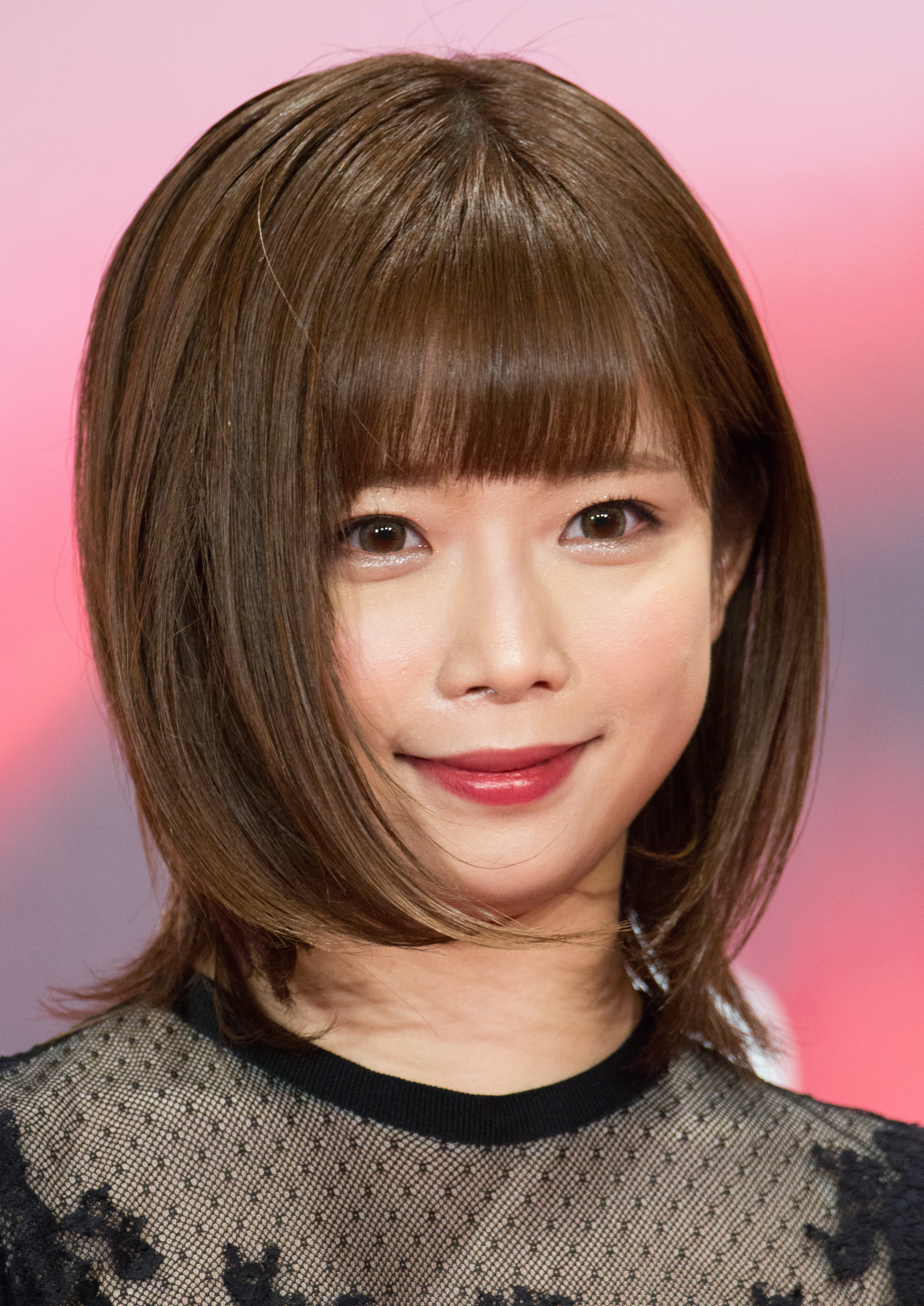
- Mana Sakura, in October 2017
- Born: March 23, 1993 (age 33); Chiba, Japan
- Education: College of Technology (Civil engineering)
- Occupations: AV idol; gravure model; novelist
- Years active: 2011–present
- Website: blog.livedoor.jp

Mana Sakura (Japanese: 紗倉まな, Hepburn: Sakura Mana; born March 23, 1993) is a Japanese AV idol, gravure model, novelist and singer. Originally debuting as a model, she transitioned to AV in 2012, becoming an exclusive performer for Soft On Demand and starred over 150 adult films since her debut. Sakura is considered one of the most popular and recognizable contemporary AV idols as she managed to crossover into mainstream entertainment with regular appearances in television, films and even video games as well. She also became an accomplished author, publishing several novels, magazine essays and running columns.

== Life and career ==
Born in Chiba, Mana Sakura studied civil engineering at the College of Technology. She debuted as a mainstream model at 18 in the gravure video 18 Years Old Mana Sakura Pretty Moe Factory, published in November 2011.

In February 2012, Sakura entered the AV industry with the video AV Debut Mana released by the manufacturer Soft On Demand. Users at Twitter recognized her as a student at the Technical College and the subsequent publicity resulted in her debut video ranking first in DVD sales for that month at the major Japanese distributor, the DMM Corporation.

In 2013 she was named Best New Actress at the Adult Broadcasting Awards and at the same ceremony she also won the FLASH Award. Also in 2013 she appeared in the mainstream movie Goddotan: Kisu gaman senshuken the Movie (ゴッドタン キス我慢選手権 THE MOVIE), a film adaptation of the popular Japanese late night TV variety show Goddotan. In August 2013, she formed the J-Pop idol group Ototoy Friday (おとといフライデー) (originally Otome Frappuccino (乙女フラペチーノ)) with fellow AV idol Minami Kojima.

In 2014 she was voted as second place in an election for Yakuza 0, making her a character in the video game. She was a regular cast member in the second season of the Tokyo Broadcasting System's TV drama Ushijima the Loan Shark broadcast from January to March 2014. In the Fall of 2014, Sakura was enlisted to write a column for Gazoo.com, a promotional portal for Toyota. A spokesman said that the company considered her background and interest in driving "to be suitable for their needs." She also appeared in a second mainstream movie in 2014, the action science fiction film Danger Dolls released in September 2014.

She was once again a winner at the 2015 Adult Broadcasting Awards, this time taking the Best Actress Award and a second FLASH Award. On February 12, 2016, she published her first novel The Lowlife, a heavily autobiographical work depicting the daily lives of adult film actresses. The book was praised for Sakura's unique prose and for its raw, honest display of its subject matter. The novel was adapted into a film directed by Takahisa Zeze in 2017. She also appeared in the movie Karate Kill in the same year and won the "Media Award" at the 2016 DMM.R18 Adult Awards. Sakura was also a member of the band Sexy-J between 2014 and 2017.

By the late 2010s Sakura's career became a diversified blend of mainstream and adult film entertainment. Aside from her regular monthly AV releases from SOD, she published three more novels, became a regular columnist at online magazines, and even gave university lectures on media. Since October 2017, she has regularly appeared on AbemaTV's "Abema Prime" as a commentator, and in 2018 she was appointed as the show's news anchor.

== Filmography ==
=== Movies ===
- Goddotan: Kisu gaman senshuken the Movie (2013)
- Danger Dolls (2014)
- Karate Kill (2016)

=== Television ===
- Ushijima the Loan Shark (2014)
- Akiba's Trip: The Animation (2017) - voiced role

=== Video games ===
- Yakuza 0 (2015)

== Bibliography ==
- The Lowlife (最低。) (2016)
- Ōtotsu (凹凸) (2017)
- Negawakuba, Raise mo Ningen de (願わくば、来世も人間で) (2018)
- Haru, shinan (春、死なん) (2020)
- Gokko (ごっこ) (2023)
- Utsusemi (うつせみ) (2024)
