= Yui Hatano =

Japanese porn actress

- 波多野 結衣/はたの ゆい
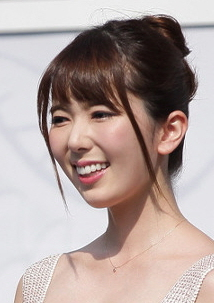
- Hatano in 2016
- Born: Yui Hatano; 24 May 1988 (age 38); Tokyo, Japan
- Years active: 2008 – present
- Height: 165 cm (5 ft 5 in)
- Website: http://blog.livedoor.jp/hatano_yui/

Yui Hatano (Japanese: 波多野 結衣/はたの ゆい, Hepburn: Hatano Yui; Born 24 May 1988) is a Japanese porn actress. Boasting one of the longest and most prolific careers in Japanese pornography, Hatano has made appearances in over 3,000 adult films so far, thus making her one of the most popular and recognizable faces in AV. Her popularity crossed over into mainstream entertainment (with appearances in theatrical films) and international territories as well, earning her the nickname "Sekai no Hatano" ("The World's Hatano"). As of 2019 she is represented by the AV agency T-Powers. She was also a member of the idol group T♡Project.

== Life and career ==
Hatano made her debut in the adult industry in 2008, when she first appeared in Amateur Or More ZERO, Less Than Actress 07 on 3 July 2008, under the Zero label of the AV company Prestige which specialized in finding and introducing amateur girls into the industry. Prior to performing in adult films, she had graduated from a cosmetology school, and had initially thought of becoming a gravure idol. However the competitive and low-paying world of gravure forced her to look for a more lucrative career which happened to be performing in adult films.

Hatano's first releases were on a monthly schedule under the Prestige, h.m.p. and Befree labels, however her popularity began to quickly rise and she began to appear at other companies like Attackers, Moodyz and Soft on Demand as well. Due to her matured looks she has often been cast into jukojo (housewife) or "older sister" type roles. She also became known for her flexible role-playing and willingness to appear in more hardcore genres (simulated rape, lesbian roles and S&M). Hatano also regularly appears in ensemble cast AV's and maintains a close relationship with other actresses like Chihiro Hara, AIKA, Ai Uehara, Tomoda Ayaka and Ruka Kanae. Her most notable working relationship is her friendly rivalship with fellow popular AV idol Hibiki Ōtsuki. Their pair "HibiHata" is well known in the industry and they appeared in dozens of adult films since 2013. In 2014, she won the Best Actress award in the 2014 DMM Adult Awards.

Hatano's output and regular AV appearances only increased in time, and by 2019 she had appeared in over 2400 AV's (including compilations).

Hatano also became popular in Singapore and Taiwan, where she is regarded as a lookalike for the popular Taiwanese actress and model Lin Chi-ling. In a 2018 compilation of AV sales on Japanese e-commerce retailer FANZA, Hatano ranked first in the Top 10 digital downloads chart. She achieved the same feat in 2019 as well, with both at the physical and digital sales.

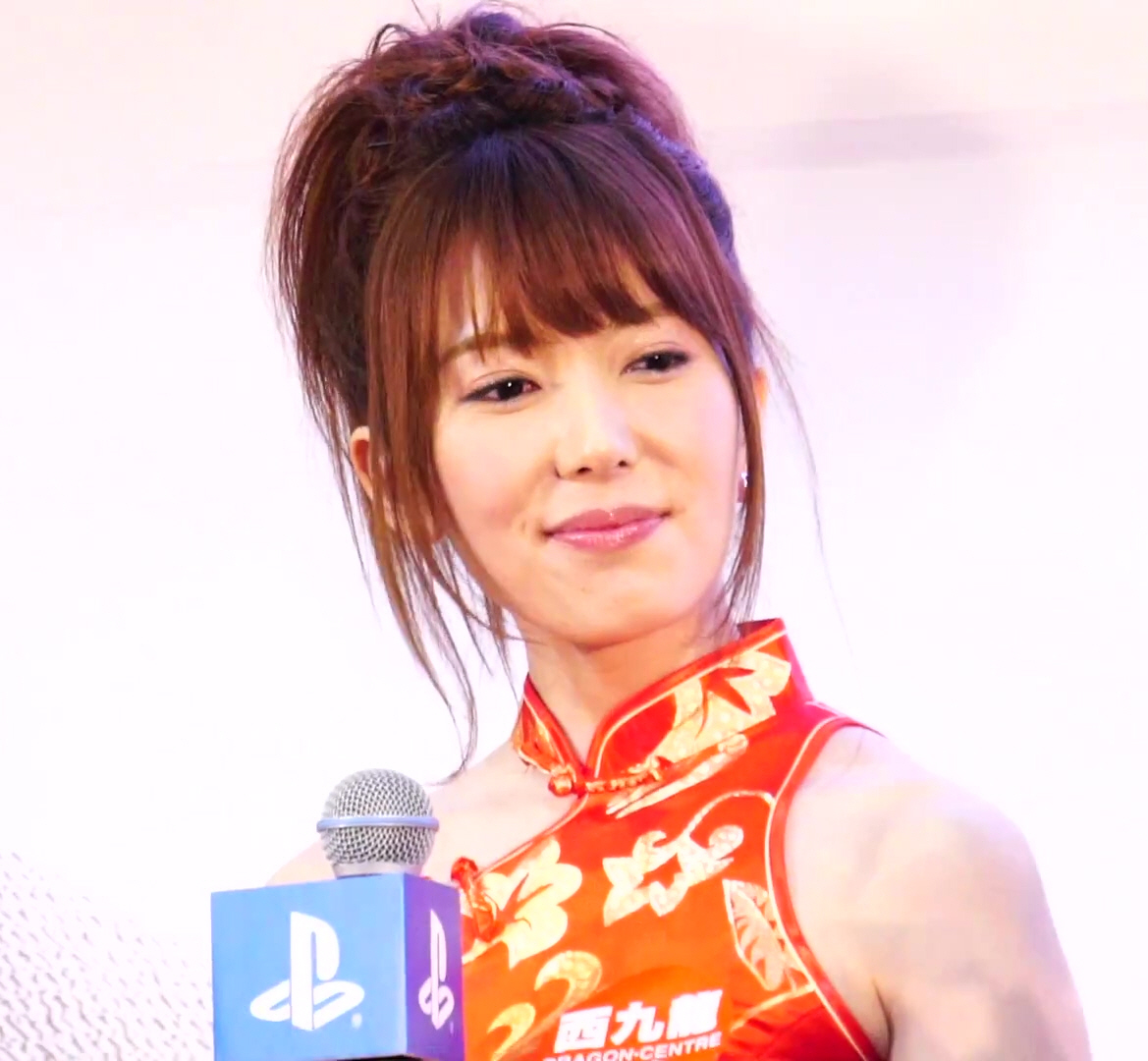
Hatano in Dragon Centre, West Kowloon, Hong Kong 2016 for the launch of Yakuza Kiwami on PS4

Hatano has had opportunities to work outside of the Japanese AV industry. She played a part in the 2013 movie Sou shen ji (Chinese: 搜神记, In Search of Spirits), a collection of short supernatural stories. She was also cast in a lead role in the 2015 Taiwanese film Sashimi (Chinese: 沙西米, transliteration of "sashimi"). In addition, she dabbled in the music industry when she joined musical idol group me-me*, which also featured AV idols Shiori Kamisaki, Ruka Kanae, and Maika. They launched a crowdfunding campaign for their first album via Japanese crowdfunding website Campfire on 1 November 2015. me-me* held their final concert on 20 March 2016. Currently she's part of the idol unit T♡Project with Hibiki Ōtsuki and Ruka Kanae.

On 26 August 2015, Taiwan's EasyCard Corporation announced that Hatano was to be featured on their public transport payment cards. The corporation stated that two collectible versions of the card, featuring a fully clothed Hatano, would be released: a "devil" edition, and an "angel" edition. EasyCard's decision to feature the AV idol drew criticism in Taiwan from parents and women's advocacy groups, who were concerned over the use of an adult film star's image. Additional controversy formed when it was discovered that one of the card's images was previously used as the cover of one of Hatano's adult films. EasyCard ended up going ahead with the sale of the metro cards, which sold out its entire run of 15,000 cards overnight. In 2017, Hatano made a guest appearance on the Taiwanese public television program Guess Who (Chinese: 誰來晚餐, Who is Coming to Dinner?). She was invited to learn more about the Hand Angel (Chinese: 手天使) nonprofit, which provides sexual services for those who are physically disabled. In gaming, Hatano has been the spokesperson for mobile games such as the Taiwanese RPG Shén guǐ huànxiǎng (Chinese: 神鬼幻想, God Ghost Fantasy) in 2014. She lent her voice and likeness to play a hostess in Yakuza Kiwami and in the remastered version of Yakuza 3 for the PlayStation 4.

On 1 March 2018, she received the Most Appearances Actress Award at the Sky PerfecTV! Adult Broadcasting Awards 2018. On March 12, 2019, she won the Most Appearances Actress Award for the second consecutive year at the Sky PerfecTV! Adult Broadcasting Awards 2019. In October 2019, she was nominated in the Dirty Talk Star category for the GEO TV × Men's Cyzo ADULT AWARD 2019. Her nickname was "Ingo no Hatano" (a pun meaning "Hatano of Dirty Talk"). In December of the same year, she won the Grand Prix in that category (the award ceremony took place on January 10 of the following year).

In October 2020, she won first place in the GEO TV Popular AV Actress Ranking for the first half of 2020. Also in October of the same year, she achieved 1st place in the GEO TV Popular AV Actress Weekly Ranking for 15 consecutive weeks. In February 2021, she ranked 8th in GEO TV's "AV Actress I Want to Receive Valentine's Chocolate From! Survey". In the Asahi Geino "2023 Current AV Actress SEXY General Election" announced in May 2023, she ranked 14th.

== Uncensored Japanese pornography ==
2009年

- Sky Angel Vol.93 : 波多野結衣（9月9日、Sky High Ent.）
- Sky High X-Collection Vol.4 : 波多野結衣（12月29日、Sky High Ent.）

2010年

- Sky Angel Blue Vol.28 (Blu-ray Disc) : KEI, 波多野結衣（1月13日、Sky High Ent.）
- Sky Angel Blue Vol.29 (Blu-ray Disc) : 波多野結衣, KEI（1月13日、Sky High Ent.）
- ヌルヌルでEキモチ（6月10日、Caribbeancom）
- Sky Angel Blue Vol.39 (Blu-ray Disc) : 波多野結衣（7月13日、Sky High Ent.）
- 美乳レフリーに反則技（7月15日、Caribbeancom）
- Encore Vol.7 : 波多野結衣（7月29日、Stage 2 Media）
- Sky High Premium Vol.7 (11月16日、Sky High Ent.)

2011年

- 3D Catwalk Poison 04 (Dreamroom Productions)
- Gold fingers 2 : 25Girls
- If Yui Hatano were My Girlfriend
- Encore Vol.16 波多野結衣（1月21日、Stage 2 Media）
- 波多野結衣 歡迎來到我的世界（一本道 052411_100)
- Encore Vol.28 波多野結衣 (EStage 2 Media)

2012年

- Bondage Woman Teacher ~Going down to be sex slave~
- Empire Vol.1 ~ 50 Bukkake & Creampie ~
- Dirty Minded Wife Advent Vol. 30
- Sky Angel Blue Vol. 87
- S Model DV 11
- THE波多野結衣 ぶっかけ50連発！（3月1日、x1x）
- 欲しがる人妻 波多野結衣 (3月15日、x1x）
- 「イってもイってもまだ足りない！」2012/10/06
- 「思う存分！もっともっと波多野結衣」2012/11/28

2013年

- Bukkake Jukujo Vol. 7
- Internal Cumshots
- Kirari 59 All Extreme Ero Woman
- S Model DV 17
- S Model DV 23
- Sky Angel Blue Vol. 104
- SkyHigh Jukujo Premium Vol. 3
- 「真実の愛に隠された現実」2013/02/12

2014年

- Red Hot Jam Vol. 350
- Red Hot Fetish Collection ~120 Shots Cream Pies 4~
- Sky Angel Blue Concentrated
- Red Hot Fetish Collection ~Cleaning Fellatio 3~
- 「ヒメコレ 高級ソープへようこそ 波多野結衣」2014/03/26

2015年

- CATWALK POISON 138 (Dreamroom Productions)
- LaForet Girl 53 Obedient Wife
- Red Hot Jam Vol. 390
- Red Hot Fetish Collection Working Girls Collection Bukkake Digest
- ストリップ劇場 ぶっかけまな板本番ショー （4月4日、Caribbeancom）
- マンコ図鑑 波多野結衣（5月15日、Caribbeancom）
- 波多野結衣のパイズリを我慢できたら生中出しファン感謝オフ会（5月15日、Caribbeancom）
- ペニスを欲しがるドMな他人妻（6月20日、Caribbeancom）

2016

- S Model 155
- S Model 158

== VR ==
2025

- 一人暮らしを始めた僕の部屋へ通う母親筆おろし濃密性交（3月1日、TMA）
- 狂愛!!【8K超肉感特化】極・変態ママが毎朝可愛がってくれるのは成長期の息子!! テカテカジュルジュル濃厚淫性交VR 波多野結衣（4月14日、肉きゅんパラダイスVR）
- 【VR】シン・むっちむちBODYで迫ってくる隣の奥さんは【超肉感追尾特化】常にヤリたがりで欲求不満のヤリマン若妻！！旦那とのSEXでは満足できず引っ越してきたばかりのボクの家に勝手にやって来て金玉袋が空っぽになるまで精子を奪っていった…「赤ちゃん出来ても大丈夫。…(5月1日、肉きゅんパラダイスVR)
- VR麗しの熟女湯屋 いらっしゃいませ即尺 & 和室ねっとり恋人プレイ 波多野結衣（5月28日、グローバルメディアエンタテインメント）
- 地図から消された村VR（6月26日、SODクリエイト）
- VR 熟女のオナニー 目の前で見せつけるイヤラしい濃厚な自慰 波多野結衣（9月20日、グローバルメディアエンタテインメント）
