= Kokomi Naruse =

Japanese AV idol

- 成瀬心美
- Born: August 10, 1989 (age 36); Niigata Prefecture, Japan
- Height: 147 cm (4 ft 10 in)

YouTube information
- Channel: 成瀬心美のここチャンネル
- Years active: 2020–present
- Genre: Entertainment
- Subscribers: 30.2 thousand
- Views: 1.32 million
- Last updated: 4 September 2024

Kokomi Naruse (Japanese: 成瀬心美, Hepburn: Naruse Kokomi; born August 10, 1989) is a Japanese singer and former AV (pornographic film) actress born in Niigata Prefecture.

== Adult video career ==
Kokomi Naruse made her adult video (AV) debut in 2009. She attributes her decision to enter the industry on fellow AV actress Tina Yuzuki, also known as Rio. Other names Naruse has used during her career include Cocomi, Emi Watanabe (渡邊恵美 or 渡辺恵美), Miho Sendo (仙道実穂) and Kyouko Naruse (成瀬きょうこ).

== Music career ==
Formed in April 2014, Naruse is currently the vocalist of Japanese band Mezcolanza (stylized as mezcolanza) and the band has released several albums.

== Awards ==
- 2012 – Sky PerfecTV! Adult Broadcasting Awards – Best Actress Award
- 2012 – Sky PerfecTV! Adult Broadcasting Awards – Nikkan Gendai Award
