= Saki Hatsumi =

Japanese former pornographic actress (born 1990)

- 初美 沙希
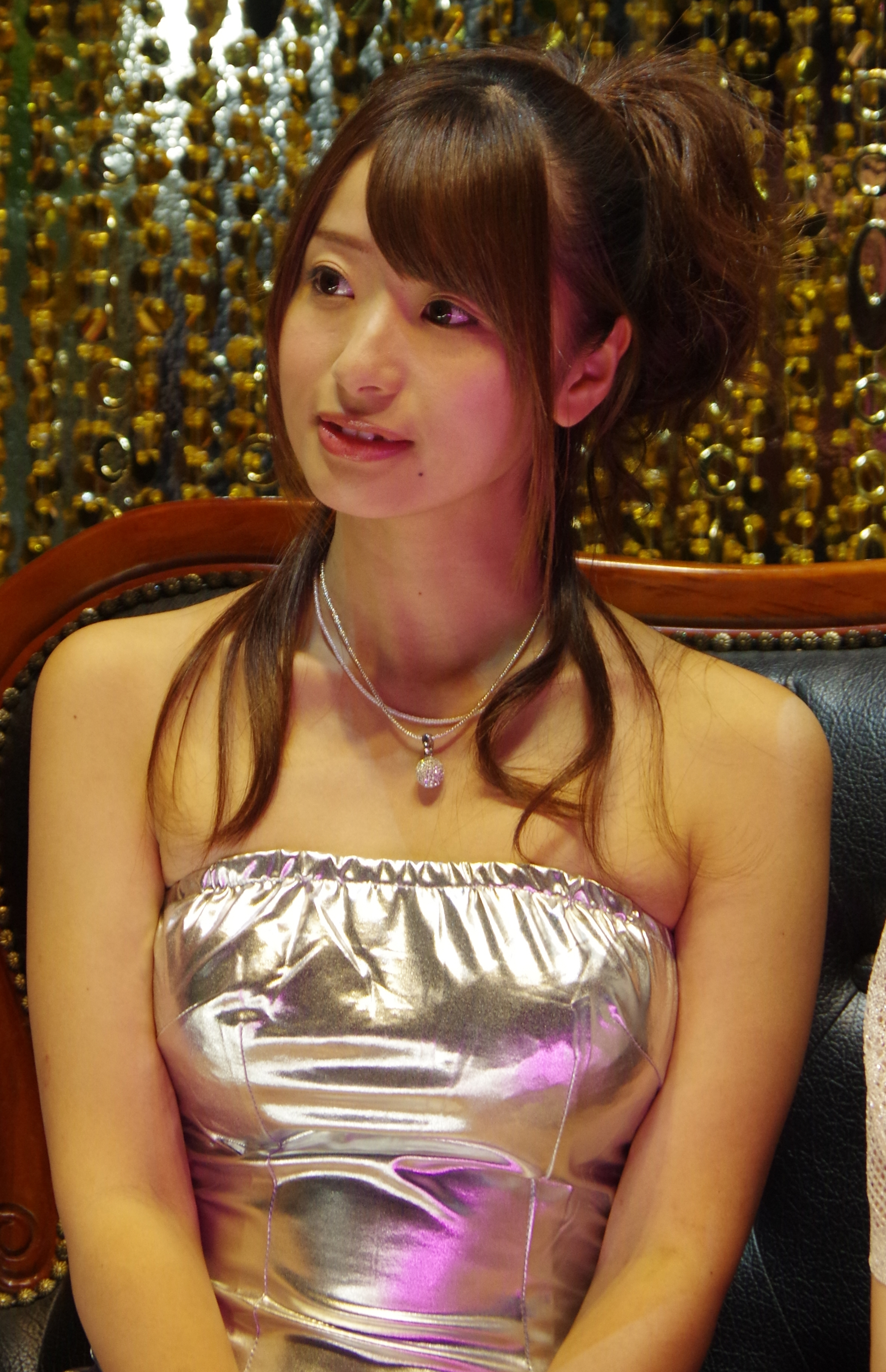
- Hatsumi at the 2014 Tokyo Game Show
- Born: October 15, 1990 (age 35); Chiba, Japan
- Occupation: Pornographic actress
- Years active: 2010–2017
- Height: 158 cm (5 ft 2 in)

Signature
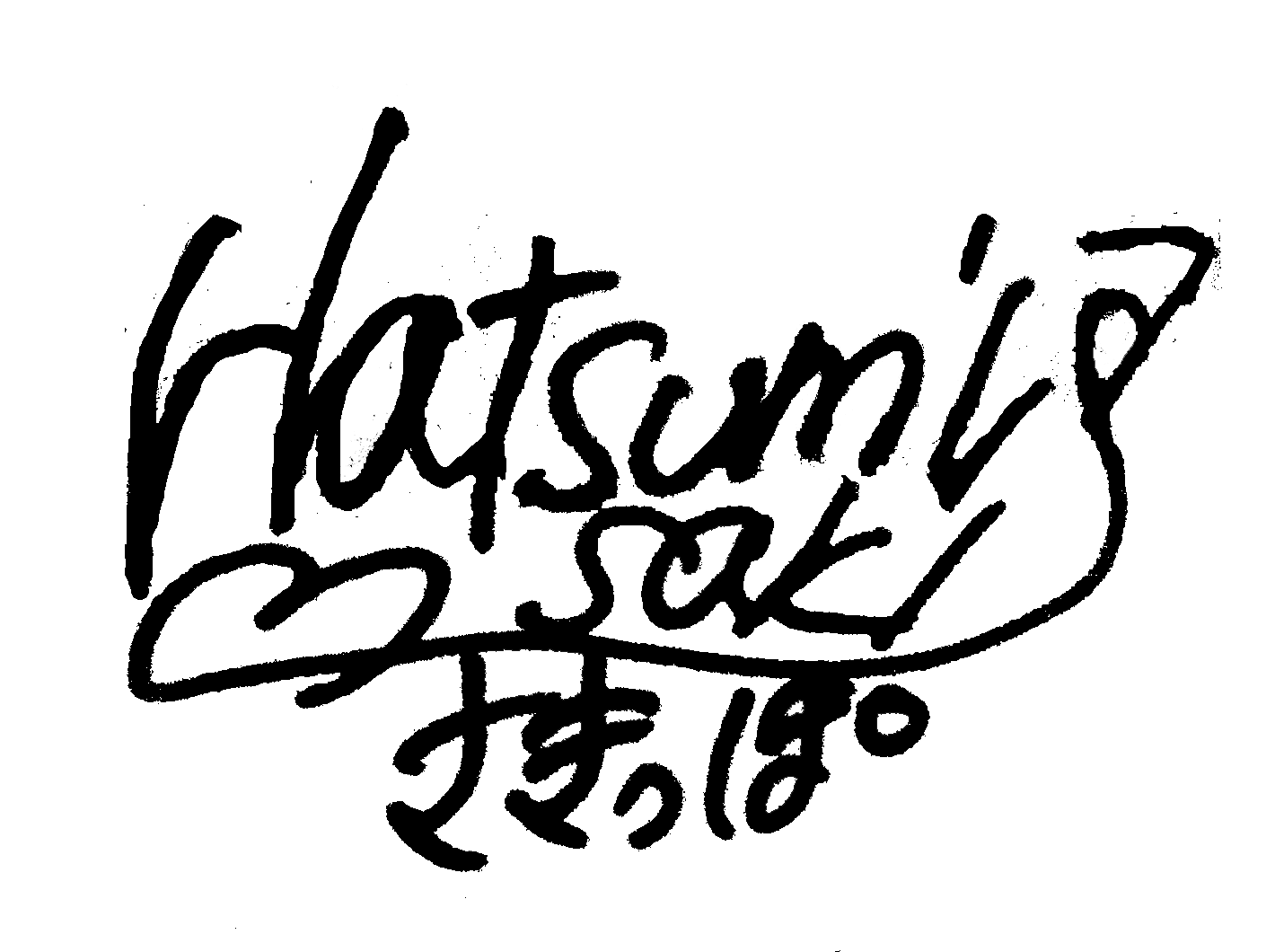

Saki Hatsumi (Japanese: 初美 沙希, Hepburn: Hatsumi Saki; born 1990) is a Japanese former pornographic film actress who was active between 2010 and 2017. A highly prolific and versatile performer, Hatsumi has over 900 credited AV appearances spanning over seven years and numerous genres. She is also a voice actress and singer.

== Career ==
Born on October 15, 1990, in Chiba prefecture, Hatsumi debuted as an adult-film (AV) actress in January 2010 under the name Shizuku. In an interview, she said her decision to become an AV actress was made during her high school years. At the time of her debut, she was what is called in the industry a "project actress" (kikaku joyū), which refers to freelance actresses who play bit roles or work in ensemble productions often without name credit. They are at the bottom of the AV hierarchy, but Hatsumi is an example of someone who worked her way up into starring roles with an exclusive contract with a production company.

Hatsumi's first appearances (as Shizuku) were under the Rocket label of the noted AV company Soft On Demand. During her first years she appeared mostly in ensemble productions under SOD's numerous labels (Hunter, SOD Create) and was often un-credited. Her roles ranged from various fetishes to lesbian porn and simulated rape. She also worked for smaller AV companies like First Star and Natural High.

In 2011 after switching agencies, she also changed her stage name to Saki Hatsumi in November 2011. This was a turning point in Hatsumi's career as she began to appear as a credited freelance (kikatan) actress working with bigger AV studios, including her first appearances at Wanz Factory and Moodyz. Hatsumi had a prolific career over the next few years with solo roles and ensemble-crew appearances as well. She also had an un-credited role in the IdeaPocket AV Naughty Relationship Amami Tsubasa And Her Elder Sister (starring Amami Tsubasa) where she played the sister's role.

In 2014 she starred in four separate AV's from four different AV studios which were all nominated in the 2014 AV Open Awards. She received her first awards nominations in this year as well. She also won three awards at the SkyTV Adult Broadcasting Awards between 2014 and 2016.

In 2015 she became an exclusive actress for the veteran AV company H.m.p., while continuing to perform with other companies, a status almost without precedent in the AV industry. On December 29, 2016, Hatsumi announced her retirement from AV and her final adult film Retirement – Saki Hatsumi, directed by Tiger Kosakai, was released on April 7, 2017, under the H.m.p. label. Her official blog also closed down on April 30, 2017.

However on February 14, 2023, she resumed her activities on social media, with her activities in the media in June.

=== Mainstream appearances ===
In 2011, while still performing under the name Shizuku, she became a member of the "sexy talent" singing group OFA 21, which released a single entitled "Love Limit" in July.

She appeared as herself in the 2015 video game Yakuza 0, providing her voice and likeness.

In March 2016, a Human Rights Now! report highlighted the negative aspects of Japan's pornographic industry. This caused a backlash among several Japanese pornographic performers, among them Hatsumi, who said: "At least in my own eyes, the current industry is very clean. I do it on my own will and so do many of my comrades".

== Filmography ==
=== Games ===
- Yakuza 0 (2015)

== Awards ==
She won three Adult Broadcasting Awards between 2014 and 2016. Since then, she won the SkyPa on Demand Adult Award and the Yukan Fuji Award, starred in the work that won Best Picture, and became the first, in the twelve-year history of the awards, to win or be involved in four major awards. This led some in the press to call her the "four crown actress" (yonkan joyū).

Year	Ceremony	Award	Work	Co-winners
2014	Adult Broadcasting Awards	FLASH Award	—N/a	—N/a
2015	Adult Broadcasting Awards	Best Picture Award	Very horny slut and a cute, perverted but shy lesbian	Chika Arimura
2016	Adult Broadcasting Awards	Best Actress	—N/a	—N/a
2016	Adult Broadcasting Awards	Best Works	—N/a	—N/a
