= Sky PerfecTV! Adult Broadcasting Awards =

Japanese adult video awards

- Date: February 2005
- Country: Japan
- Website: adult-awards.com

The Sky PerfecTV! Adult Broadcasting Awards are given for performances in adult video programs shown on SKY PerfecTV! satellite TV channels in Japan. The awards complement those presented by the AV Open / AV Grand Prix contests which are given for adult videos sold in retail outlets or on the internet.

== SKY PerfecTV! ==
SKY PerfecTV! (スカイパーフェクTV!) is Japan's largest satellite TV broadcaster with more than 4 million subscribers. The service is run by SKY Perfect JSAT Corporation, a corporation which includes various companies involved in TV, cable, telecommunications and satellites. SKY Perfect is owned by Japanese conglomerates Itochu Corporation, Fuji Television and Sony Corporation. Their channel list includes several adult offerings on channels 100 to 103 (Power Plat's), 110 to 114 (Perfect Choice), 371 (エンタ！371), and 900 to 917 (except 908–909). The adult programming ranges from the Playboy channel to extreme fetish videos (Dynamite TV 916).

== 2005 Awards ==
The 2005 Adult Broadcasting Awards, given for the 2004 broadcasting year, were known as the 2004 CS (Communications Satellite) Adult Awards (2004 CSアダルト番組アワードで). They were awarded by a panel of 5 judges comprising writer and columnist Kazuhisa Kimura, actor & director IKKAN, manga artist Mimei Sakamoto, porn actor Taka Kato and AllAbout webpage reporter Kemuta Otsubo.

The awards were given at a ceremony held in February 2005. For the main awards, a Grand Prize was given along with three runner-up awards for excellence.

Jury Grand Prize - Original Programming

- Nao Oikawa - Fan Appreciation Hot Springs Bus Tour (及川奈央のファン感謝温泉バスツアー) [Iyokan Tsushin - 916]

Awards for Excellence - Original Programming

- Weekly! Women's Bathing News (週刊！女子アナ入浴ニュース) [Paradise TV - 913]
- Midnight 7 Interview with Naomi Tani (ミッドナイトインタビュー7 谷ナオミ) [Satellite Theatre]
- Women Get Lewd 10 (女が淫らになるテープ10淫獣はあいなのかまる～っ！) [Perfect Choice]

Jury Grand Prize - Program

- Twelve Slutty Lesbian Women Versus Twelve Men (女子十二尺棒～女子十二痴女・女子十二レズ・女子十二対男子十二壮絶二十四P) [Queen Bee 911]

Awards for Excellence - Program

- Yorutomo #7 (よるとも#7) [ENTA! 371]
- My Loving Pet Wife (愛しの人妻ペット) [Milk - 906]
- Four Stewardesses Raped in a Plane (機内で犯される四人のスチュワーデス」（パワープラッツ) [Power Plat's]

Jury Grand Prize - Best Actress

- Hikaru Koto: Indecent Attraction (淫らなほどに悩ましい) [Rainbow Channel - 901]

Awards for Excellence - Best Actress

- Laurie Fetter: Playmate Profile [Playboy Channel - 900]
- Nao Oikawa: Uki-Uki Watching (及川奈央のウキウキウォッチング) [Manzox Channel - 912]
- Sora Aoi: Scenes from the Original CS Collection (蒼井そらCSオリジナル名場面賞」（スプラッシュ) [Splash - 907]

Award for Excellence - Advertising

- Paradise TV (913)

Channel Actress Performance Awards

- Mai Hagiwara (Cherry Bomb - 905-914-915)
- Sora Aoi (Splash - 907)
- Naho Ozawa (ENTA! 371)
- Kurumi Morishita (Non Stop - 917)
- An Nanba (Queen Bee 911)
- Karen Kisaragi (Rainbow - 901)

== 2006 Awards ==
The 2006 Adult Broadcasting Awards (日本アダルト放送大賞2006), given for the 2005 broadcasting year on SKY PerfecTV!, included 31 channels and more than 10,000 adult programs. Awards were determined by viewer votes on the Internet. a

Nominated for Best Actress were Yua Aida, Mako Katase, Riko Tachibana, Sora Aoi, Minami Aoyama, Manami Amamiya, Hotaru Akane, Hime Kamiya, Nao, Nana Natsume, Honoka, Mihiro and Hitomi Hayasaka. Nominations for Best Mature Actress included Aki Tomosaki, Ayako Satonaka, Ayano Murasaki, and 2 others. There were 11 nominations for Best Program and 7 for Best Original Program.

The winners were announced at the award ceremony held on March 20, 2006.

Best Actress Award

- Yua Aida

Best Mature Actress Award

- Aki Tomosaki

Best Program Award

- SOD and the Game of Life 2 (SOD的人生ゲーム2)

Best Original Programming Award

- Karen Kisaragi Super High Class Soap Girl (如月カレンの超高級ソープ嬢)

== 2007 Awards ==
The 2007 Adult Broadcasting Awards (日本アダルト放送大賞2007) combined with the 2007 Erotic Ladies Festival or Eroide Onna Matsuri (EROIDE女祭り2007) were held on March 15, 2007 for the 2006 broadcast year. Once again more than 10,000 adult programs were broadcast during the year on SKY PerfecTV! channels. Awards were determined by a combination of votes of a Committee and viewer votes on the Official Website. Twelve actresses were nominated for the Best Actress Award: Runa Akatsuki, Yuma Asami, Nana Otone, Mako Katase, Ai Takeuchi, Risa Coda, Riko Tachibana, Azumi Harusaki, Honoka, Miki Mizuasa (Miki Miasa), Yuuna Mizumoto and Emiru Momose. Among the actresses nominated for Best Mature Actress were Natsuko Kayama, Chisato Shoda, Rinko Nomiya, Arisa Matumoto and the Paradise TV "Old Ladies Club" or "Kurabu Obanko" (おバン子クラブ).

The awards were presented at a hotel in the Shibuya district of Tokyo before an audience of 300, with representatives from the weekly men's magazine WEB, the media, and local and foreign journalists.

The winners of the 2007 Adult Broadcasting Awards were:

Best Actress Award

- Honoka [Midnight Blue Channel]

Best Mature Actress Award

- Chisato Shoda

Most Appearances Award

- Riko Tachibana [Flamingo]

In addition to the awards, the "Erotic Ladies Festival" part of the festivities consisted of a number of competitions among the actresses present. After an opening dance by Paradise TV's "Old Ladies Club", the "contests" began with a quiz on sex education won by Nana Otone from the Ruby Channel. The endurance feat was a breast-counter competition which Runa Akatsuki won by jiggling 116 times in 30 seconds. The skill contests consisted of faking an orgasm while riding a mechanical bull and looking innocent (won by Ai Takeuchi) and an ice cream popsicle sucking test (taken by Natsumi of the Obanka Club). A panty-throw to the audience ended the ceremony.

As part of the "Erotic Ladies Festival", a number of individual awards were presented to the actresses at the ceremony, including the Slender Award (Risa Coda), Beautiful Breasts Award (Runa Akatsuki), Gravure Idol Award (Emiru Momose), Big Breasts Idol Award (Yuma Asami), Moe Award (Ai Takeuchi) and the Shiofuki Award (Yui).

== 2008 Awards ==
The 2008 Adult Broadcasting Awards (日本アダルト放送大賞2008) combined with the festival known as the 2008 Erotic Ladies Festival or Eroide Onna Matsuri (EROIDE女祭り2008) were held March 30, 2008 for the 2007 broadcasting year. The awards were determined by a combination of viewer's votes at the Official Website and voting by a committee for actresses and programs nominated from the more than 10,000 adult programs aired on SKY PerfecTV! channels in 2007. There were 11 contestants for the Best Actress Award: Akane Mochida, Himata Seto, Miki Yamashiro, Nurie Mika, Akiho Yoshizawa, Nana Otone, Rio (Tina Yuzuki), Yuma Asami, Riku Shiina, Misa Kikouden & Kotone Aisaki. The five nominees for Best Mature Actress were: Reiko Shimura, Rina Takakura, Kana Mochiduki, Yuki Matsuura and Mirei Tsubaki.

The event was held in a hotel in the Shibuya area of Tokyo before an audience of about 520.

The winners of the 2008 Adult Broadcasting Awards were:

Best Actress Award

- Rio (Tina Yuzuki) [Cherry Bomb]

Best Mature Actress Award

- Kana Mochiduki [Paradise TV]

Most Appearances Award

- Yuma Asami [Quenn Bee 911]

Winner EX Award

- Tina Yuzuki (Rio) Healthy Beauty (柚木ティナ(Rio)「爽健美女」) [Cherry Bomb]

Best Program Award

- 24 Hours Television Ero Saves the Earth (24時間テレビ エロは地球を救う！2007) [ParadiseTV]

Once again, for the "Erotic Ladies Festival" section, there were contests of knowledge, stamina and skill with Yuma Asami being a big winner. The evening was again ended by a panty-throw to the assembled audience.

== 2009 Awards ==
The Official Website for the 2009 Adult Broadcasting Awards (日本アダルト放送大賞2009) opened in November 2008. Nominations and voting continued until the beginning of March 2009. The 2009 awards ceremony was held on March 25, 2009 at a hotel in the Shibuya district of Tokyo. As in previous years, the awards were determined by a combination of voting by the organizational committee and by viewer's votes at the Official Website. The programs were nominated for the awards from the more than 10,000 adult programs aired on SKY PerfecTV! channels in 2008. There were 8 actresses nominated for the Best Actress Award: Rio Hamazaki, Kirara Asuka, Kotono, Anje Hoshi, Kaho Kasumi, Momo Kaede, Azusa Itagaki and Miyu Hoshino. For the Best New Actress Award the four actresses nominated were Aino Kishi, Kirara Asuka, Haruka Ito and Minori Hatsune. The Best Mature Actress entries were Emiko Koike, Yuki Matsuura, Honami Takasaka and Chisato Shoda.

The winners of the 2009 Adult Broadcasting Awards and the channels they represent were:

Best Actress Award

- Kirara Asuka [Rainbow]

Best New Actress Award

- Haruka Ito [Cherry Bomb]

Best Mature Actress Award

- Emiko Koike [Power Plat]

Most Appearances Award

- Chisato Shoda [Dynamite TV]

Best Program Award

- Nude Sign Language News (裸の手話辞典) with Momo Kaede [Paradise TV]

Best HD Program Award

- Kirara Professional Soap Girl (キララの凄テク★泡プロ 明日花キララ) with Kirara Asuka, produced by h.m.p.

Winner EX Award

- Continuous Orgasm (イクガミ～それを受け取った者は24時間イカされまくる) [Paradise TV]

Twenty-year-old newcomer Kirara Asuka in a low-cut evening gown accepted her award saying "I am delighted", while for Haruka Ito the sentiment was "This is not just mine, it's the result of the support of everyone". Last year's winner in the Most Appearances category, Yuma Asami was on hand to present this year's award and last year's Best Actress winner Rio (Tina Yuzuki) was also present offering advice and encouragement: "After I won I had such a great year and received tremendous support from my fans, I hope you will use this as an opportunity to further excel in your career". As usual, the ceremony also had a series of "contests" for the AV actresses. Anje Hoshi won one section by skillful reading of a dirty-nurse story, Kotono won at charades (describing a banana, a condom and lotion) and Kaho Kasumi took the "air sex" prize. The end of the ceremony was marked by a panty-throw to the audience.

== 2010 Awards ==
The Official Website for the 2010 SKY! TV Awards (スカパー！アダルト放送大賞 2010) opened in November 2009 and started accepting applications for viewing on December 1, 2009. Nominations and fan voting at the website continued until March 1, 2010. The award ceremony was held on March 24, 2010 at a theatre in Shibuya, Tokyo with 300 guests attending. The event was sponsored by the SKY Perfect JSAT Corporation (スカパーJSAT株式会社) and the CS (Communications Satellite) Broadcasting Adult Programming Ethics Committee (CS放送成人番組倫理委員会). As in the past, winners were selected from the more than 10,000 programs aired on 31 adult channels by online fan voting and a special committee.

Five actresses were nominated for the Best Actress Award: Elly Akira (Ch. 912), Nana Nanaumi (Ch. 905-914-915), Sasa Handa (Ch. 916), Maria Ozawa (Ch. 911 QueenBee) and Saori Hara (Ch. 902). Nominated for Best New Actress were Shelly Fujii (Ch. 901), Akari Asahina (Ch. 905-914-915), Risa Tsukino (Ch. 371), Yuzuka Kinoshita (Ch. 904) and an amateur girl from the Paradise TV show "Loss of Virginity" (処女喪失). The four actresses nominated for Best Mature Actress were: Ayane Asakura (Ch. 910), Reiko Nakamori (Ch. 900), Natsumi Horiguchi (Ch. 110–115) and Riri Kouda (Ch. 913 Paradise TV). The 2010 ceremony also featured two media award categories, one sponsored by the web portal company Livedoor and the other by tabloid newspaper Nikkan Gendai.

The winners of the 2010 Adult Broadcasting Awards and the channels they represented were:

Best Actress Award

- Saori Hara (Midnight Blue 902)

Best New Actress Award

- Shelly Fujii (Rainbow Channel 901)

Best Mature Actress Award

- Natsumi Horiguchi (Perfect Choice 110–115)

Livedoor Award

- Maria Ozawa (Queenbee 911)

Nikkan Gendai Award

- Risa Tsukino (Enta! 371)

Best Program Award

- Yuzuka Kinoshita – New Face (新人 木下柚花舞い降りた巨乳天使) with Yuzuka Kinoshita (Ruby Channel 904), produced by Maxing

Best HD Program Award

- Japan's Number One Lewd, Beautiful Mature Lady Decided At Last! (豪華淫乱！絶世の美女大集合！熟ユニバース) with Riri Kouda, Kana Mochizuki and others (Paradise TV Channel 946)

Last year's winners, Kirara Asuka and Haruka Ito, were on hand to present the trophies to this year's honorees in the Best Actress and Best New Actress categories. Asuka told this year's winners "I was able to grow throughout the year as a result of my many experiences". Best Actress award winner Saori Hara, who had been cited by the police for outdoor nude photo shots in January, said she was "so surprised" to receive the award while Maria Ozawa, receiving a media award sponsored by web portal Livedoor, was "not at all expecting this". Emotional moments came from Best New Actress Shelly Fujii who broke down in tears and Yuzuka Kinoshita who said her Best Program Award "was a true team effort". Riri Kouda representing the Paradise TV entry which won the HD Program prize hoped "that we were able to convey the fun we had while shooting the film". Natsumi Horiguchi won the 'mature' actress award at age 29.

The usual erotic games and a stage show featuring a 3-D presentation followed and the evening was concluded with the now traditional panty-throw to the assembled crowd.

== 2011 Awards ==
The Official Website for the 2011 SKY! TV Awards (スカパー！アダルト放送大賞2011) opened on November 25, 2010 and began accepting applications for nominations on December 12, 2010. The voting and application process ended on February 8, 2011. The award ceremony was held on March 7, 2011 at a hotel ballroom in Tokyo's Chiyoda district with an audience of 400 guests invited by lottery. The event was sponsored by the SKY Perfect JSAT Corporation Adult Programming Ethics Committee (JSAT株式会社、成人番組倫理委員会) and the CS (Communications Satellite) Broadcasting Adult Programming Ethics Committee (CS放送成人番組倫理委員会).

Five actresses were nominated for the Best Actress Award: Yuu Asakura (Ch. 911), Tsubasa Amami (Ch. 371), Jessica Kizaki (Ch. 905, 914, 915), Kei Megumi (Ch. 942) and Azumi Harusaki (Ch. 912). Nominated for Best New Actress were Uta Kohaku (Ch. 946), Kaori Sakura (Ch. 944, 901), Nina (Ch. 945) and Ai Haneda (Ch. 110–115). The five actresses nominated for Best Mature Actress were: Yū Kawakami (Ch. 110–115), Yayoi Yanagida (Ch. 100–108), Fumie Tokikoshi (Ch. 900), Misa Yuki (Ch. 910) and Nanako Mori (Ch. 904). Hikaru Shiina (Ch. 904) was also nominated for Best New Actress but she was unable to attend and her nomination was withdrawn.

Awards were also given by various media organizations, including internet service provider and web portal Livedoor, newspapers Tokyo Sports and Yukan Fuji, and tabloid magazine Shukan Asahi Geino. The winners of the 2011 Adult Broadcasting Awards and the channels they represented were:

Best Actress Award

- Yuu Asakura (KMP Channel 911)

Best New Actress Award

- Ai Haneda (Perfect Choice 110–115)

Best Mature Actress Award

- Yū Kawakami (Perfect Choice 110–115)

Best Program Award

- Beautiful Lesbian Alumni (美しき同窓生レズ, Utsukushiki dōsōsei rezu) with Yumi Kazama and Misa Yuki (Zap TV), produced by Nadeshiko

Best HD Program Award

- No Panty News (東京女子アナノーパンNEＷS, Tōkyō joshi ananōpan NEWS) with Uta Kohaku (Paradise TV HD Channel 946)

Livedoor Award

- Jessica Kizaki (Cherry Bomb 905, 914, 915)

Tokyo Sports Award

- Azumi Harusaki (Manzox Channel 912)

Yukan Fuji Award

- Yayoi Yanagida (Power Plat 100–108)

Shukan Asahi Geino Award

- Tsubasa Amami (ENTA! 371)

Best Actor Award

- Hiroshi Shimabukuro (島袋 浩) (for his contributions to the adult video industry over many years)

Last year's winners in the Best Actress and Best New Actress categories, Saori Hara and Shelly Fujii, presented the trophies to this year's honorees. Hara had also earlier promoted voting for the event with a PR visit to the offices of the tabloid paper Weekly Taishū (Shukan Taishu) in January 2011, where she commented that it has taken time for her to realize the full significance of her 2010 Best Actress Award.

== 2012 Awards ==
Best Actress Award

- Kokomi Naruse

Best New Actress Award

- Kana Yume

Best Mature Actress Award

- Maki Hojo

Best Film Award

- Shiori Kamisaki (Shiori Kamisaki G cups Ultra Graces, k.m.p.)

FLASH Award

- Tsukasa Aoi

Livedoor Award

- Kirioka Satsuki

Yukan Fuji Award

- Hatsuki Nozomi

Cyzo Award

- Chika Eiro

Nikkan Gendai Award

- Kokomi Naruse

== 2013 Awards ==
The 2013 SKY! TV Awards (アダルト放送大賞2013) were once again sponsored by the SKY Perfect JSAT Corporation Adult Programming Ethics Committee (JSAT株式会社、成人番組倫理委員会) and the CS (Communications Satellite) Broadcasting Adult Programming Ethics Committee (CS放送成人番組倫理委員会). Voting for nominated actresses and programs was held on the Official Site from November 1, 2012 to January 15, 2013 with the awards being presented in Tokyo on February 26, 2013.

The four actresses nominated Best Actress were Shiori Kamisaki (KMP Channel HD 942), Akiho Yoshizawa (Playboy Channel HD 943), Haruki Satō (Rainbow Channel HD 944) and Hibiki Ōtsuki (Paradise TV HD 948). There were six nominations for the Best New Actress Award: Mayu Kamiya (Rainbow Channel HD 944), Nami Hoshino (Rainbow Channel HD 944), Mana Sakura (Midnight Blue HD 945), Yui Fujishima (Cherry Bomb 947), Mei Matsumoto (Manzox+ 958) and Minami Kojima (エンタ！959). Nominated for Best Mature Actress were Akino Chihiro (Paradise TV HD 946), Hisae Yabe (AV King 964), Maya Sawamura (Ruby 965), Reiko Kagami (Power Plat's 968) and Akari Hoshino (Perfect Choice 972–974).

Awards were also given by various media organizations, including internet service provider Livedoor, newspapers Tokyo Sports and Yukan Fuji, weekly magazines SPA! and FLASH, and monthly magazine and website サイゾー賞 (Cyzo).

Best Actress Award

- Haruki Satō

Best New Actress Award

- Mana Sakura

Best Mature Actress Award

- Akari Hoshino

Best Program Award

- Masochistic Lascivious Lady Akiho Yoshizawa (イキまくる妄想変態オンナ明歩の飽くなき性欲！！, Akiho Yoshizawa doemu jibaku chijo) starring Akiho Yoshizawa (Playboy Channel HD), produced by Maxing

FLASH Award

- Mana Sakura

SPA! Award

- Yui Fujishima

Yukan Fuji Award

- Shiori Kamisaki

Cyzo Award

- Haruki Satō

Tokyo Sports Award

- Hibiki Ōtsuki

== 2014 Awards ==
The 2014 SKY! Adult Broadcasting Awards (スカパー！アダルト放送大賞2014), celebrating their 10th anniversary, were once again sponsored by the SKY Perfect JSAT Corporation Adult Programming Ethics Committee (JSAT株式会社、成人番組倫理委員会) and the CS (Communications Satellite) Broadcasting Adult Programming Ethics Committee (CS放送成人番組倫理委員会). Awards were also given by various media organizations, including the newspapers Tokyo Sports and Yukan Fuji, weekly magazines FLASH and Shukan Taishu, and monthly magazine and website サイゾー賞 (Cyzo), plus a new On Demand Web award.

Best Actress Award

- Yui Hatano

Best New Actress Award

- Marina Shiraishi

Best Mature Actress Award

- Kimika Ichijō

Best Program Award

- Beautiful Girls Together Ecchicchi (美少女ふたりでエッチッチ！) starring Ai Uehara & Wakaba Onoue (directed by ZAMPA) from the kawaii studio

SKY! On Demand Web Award FLASH Award

- Saki Hatsumi

Shukan Taishu Award

- Nono Mizusawa

Yukan Fuji Award

- Yui Hatano

Cyzo Award

- Kimika Ichijō

Tokyo Sports Award

- Marina Shiraishi

== 2015 Awards ==
The 11th edition of the SKY! Adult Broadcasting Awards (スカパー！アダルト放送大賞2014), sponsored by the SKY Perfect JSAT Corporation Adult Programming Ethics Committee (JSAT株式会社、成人番組倫理委員会) and the CS (Communications Satellite) Broadcasting Adult Programming Ethics Committee (CS放送成人番組倫理委員会) were held in Tokyo on March 3, 2015. Awards were also given by various media organizations, including the newspapers Tokyo Sports and Yukan Fuji, weekly magazines FLASH and Shukan Taishu, and monthly magazine and website サイゾー賞 (Cyzo), plus an On Demand Web award.

Best Actress Award

- Mana Sakura

Best New Actress Award

- Moe Amatsuka

Best Mature Actress Award

- Ayumi Shinoda

Best Picture Award

- Very horny slut and a cute, perverted but shy lesbian (こりゃたまらん！可愛い変態の萌え照れレズ) starring Chika Arimura & Saki Hatsumi from the h.m.p studio

SKY! On Demand Web Award

- Nono Mizusawa

Actor Award

- Ken Shimizu

FLASH Award

- Mana Sakura

Shukan Taishu Award

- Erika Kitagawa

Yukan Fuji Award

- Ayumi Shinoda

Cyzo Award

- Kizuna Sakura

Tokyo Sports Award

- Chika Arimura

Best actress award winner Mana Sakura representing the Splash Channel 966 received her prize from last year's winner Yui Hatano and said she would "forever treasure the support and encouragement of each of my fans". The award ceremony concluded with the traditional rolled panties toss to the audience.

== 2016 Awards ==
Best Actress

- Saki Hatsumi

Best Newcomer

- ChiNa Matsuoka

Best MILF

- Hiroki Narimiya

Best Works

- Saki Hatsumi

Saizo award

- Sakurai Ayu

FLASH award

- ChiNa Matsuoka

Weekly popular

- Natsuko Kayama

== 2017 Awards ==
Best Actress

- AIKA

Best Newcomer

- Kana Momonogi

Best MILF

- Hazuki Nozomi

Best Works

- Yua Mikami

SKY Perfect on Demand Adult Award

- Riku Minato

Meritorious Labor award

- Akira Nakao

Tokyo Sports award

- Kana Momonogi

Weekly popular

- Mirei Yokoyama

Saizo award

- Iori Kogawa

FLASH award

- Yua Mikami

== 2018 Awards ==
Best Actress

- Moe Amatsuka

Best Newcomer

- Noa Eikawa

Best MILF

- Ian Hanasaki

Best Works

- Kurea Hasumi

Sky Perfect On Demand Adult Award

- Mao Kurata

Most Appearances Award

- Yui Hatano

Tokyo Sports award

- Ian Hanasaki

FLASH award

- Masami Ichikawa

Weekly popular

- Moe Amatsuka

== 2019 Awards ==
Best Actress

- Makoto Toda

Best Newcomer

- Mahiro Tadai

Best MILF

- Ayano Kato

Best Works

- Ayaka Tomoda

Sky Perfect On Demand Adult Award

- Ayumi Kimito

Most Appearances Award

- Yui Hatano

Tokyo Sports award

- Yu Shinoda

FLASH award

- Makoto Toda

Weekly popular

- Akari Mitani

== 2020 Awards ==
The 16th edition of the SKY! Adult Broadcasting Awards (スカパー！アダルト放送大賞2020), sponsored by the SKY Perfect JSAT Corporation Adult Programming Ethics Committee (JSAT株式会社、成人番組倫理委員会) and the CS (Communications Satellite) Broadcasting Adult Programming Ethics Committee (CS放送成人番組倫理委員会) were held in Tokyo. Initially scheduled to be held on March 17, but it was postponed due to COVID-19 pandemic in Japan. The award was eventually held on November 28, 2020. It was the first time the awards was held without audiences.

Best Actress

- Kizuna Sakura

Best Newcomer

- Manami Oura

Best MILF

- Maiko Ayase

Sky Perfect On Demand Adult Award

- Yuna Ogura

Darake! award

- Hikaru Konno

== 2021 Awards ==
The 17th edition of the SKY! Adult Broadcasting Awards (スカパー！アダルト放送大賞2021) was cancelled due to COVID-19 pandemic in Japan.

== 2022 Awards ==
The 18th edition of the SKY! Adult Broadcasting Awards (スカパー！アダルト放送大賞2022), sponsored by the SKY Perfect JSAT Corporation Adult Programming Ethics Committee (JSAT株式会社、成人番組倫理委員会) and the CS (Communications Satellite) Broadcasting Adult Programming Ethics Committee (CS放送成人番組倫理委員会) were held in Tokyo on March 6, 2022. But due to ongoing COVID-19 pandemic in Japan, it was the second time the awards was held without audiences.

Most Valuable Actress

- Ai Hongo

Most Intelligent Actress

- Meru Ito

Most Technical Actress

- Ai Hongo

EX Girls

- Yui Hatano
- Yu Shinoda
- Ai Hongo

== 2023 Awards ==
The 19th edition of the SKY! Adult Broadcasting Awards (スカパー！アダルト放送大賞2023), sponsored by the SKY Perfect JSAT Corporation Adult Programming Ethics Committee (JSAT株式会社、成人番組倫理委員会) and the CS (Communications Satellite) Broadcasting Adult Programming Ethics Committee (CS放送成人番組倫理委員会) were held in Tokyo on March 25, 2023. Starting from 2023 Awards, the channel recommendation format will be abolished. There was no grand prize, and instead three EX girls were chosen to be the promotional ambassadors for "SPOOX EX".

EX Girls

- Hibiki Natsume
- Nozomi Arimura
- Chiharu Miyazawa

== 2024 Awards ==
The 20th edition of the SKY! Adult Broadcasting Awards (スカパー！アダルト放送大賞2024), sponsored by the SKY Perfect JSAT Corporation Adult Programming Ethics Committee (JSAT株式会社、成人番組倫理委員会) and the CS (Communications Satellite) Broadcasting Adult Programming Ethics Committee (CS放送成人番組倫理委員会) were held in Tokyo on June 26, 2024. Starting from 2024 Awards, the award format based on voting will be abolished. Like last year's awards, there was no grand prize, and instead four EX girls were chosen to be the promotional ambassadors for "SPOOX EX", including a winner from Best Mature Actress in 2011 awards, Yū Kawakami.

EX Girls

- Yū Kawakami
- Akari Niimura
- Kana Morisawa
- Yuria Yoshine
