= Yakuza 0 =

2015 video game

- North American cover art
- Developer: Ryu Ga Gotoku Studio (Note: Ported to Windows by Lab42 and Hardlight)
- Publisher: Sega
- Director: Kazuki Hosokawa
- Producers: Masayoshi Yokoyama; Mitsuhiro Shimano
- Designer: Koji Yoshida
- Programmer: Yutaka Ito
- Artist: Saizo Nagai
- Writers: Masayoshi Yokoyama (Kiryu's story); Tsuyoshi Furuta (Majima's story)
- Composer: Hidenori Shoji
- Series: Yakuza
- Platforms: PlayStation 3; PlayStation 4; Windows; Xbox One; Nintendo Switch 2; PlayStation 5; Xbox Series X/S
- Release: 12 March 2015: PlayStation 3; JP: 12 March 2015 PlayStation 4; JP: 12 March 2015; WW: 24 January 2017 Windows; WW: 1 August 2018 Xbox One; WW: 26 February 2020; Director’s Cut; Nintendo Switch 2; WW: 5 June 2025 PS5, Windows, XSX/S; WW: 8 December 2025
- Genres: Action-adventure, beat 'em up
- Mode: Single-player

Yakuza 0 (Note: Japanese: 龍が如く０ 誓いの場所, Hepburn: Ryū ga Gotoku Zero: Chikai no Basho; lit. "Like a Dragon 0: The Place of Oath") is a 2015 action-adventure game developed by Ryu Ga Gotoku Studio and published by Sega. It is the sixth main installment in the Yakuza series and a prequel to the original game. It was released for PlayStation 3 and PlayStation 4 in Japan in March 2015, and in North America and Europe for PlayStation 4 in January 2017. It was released on Windows on 1 August 2018 and on Xbox One on 26 February 2020. An enhanced version, titled Yakuza 0: Director’s Cut (Note: 龍が如く0 誓いの場所 DIRECTOR'S CUT(ディレクターズカット), Ryū ga Gotoku Zero: Chikai no Basho Direkutāzu Katto; lit. "Like a Dragon 0: The Place of Oath Director's Cut") was released for Nintendo Switch 2 on 5 June 2025; it later released on other platforms on December 8 of that year.

Set in late 1988 during Japan's bubble era and seventeen years before the events of the first game, the story follows Kazuma Kiryu and Goro Majima as they get embroiled in a conflict between various Yakuza factions for control of a patch of land known as the "Empty Lot".

The game received generally favorable reviews from critics, and is largely responsible for the franchise's rise in popularity and sales in the West, with the series considered obscure beforehand. Yakuza 0 was followed up by the title Yakuza Kiwami, which was a remake of the original game and the next chronological installment of the series.

== Gameplay ==
Yakuza 0 is an action-adventure game set in an open world environment and played from a third-person perspective. The game takes place from December 1988 to January 1989, in Kamurochō and Sotenbori, fictionalized recreations of Tokyo's Kabukichō and Osaka's Dōtonbori areas respectively. The player controls series protagonist Kazuma Kiryu and recurring character Goro Majima, alternating between the two at predetermined points during the story.

Players can freely walk around Kamurochō and Sotenbori, interacting with people they meet to trigger side-quests, battling enemies who attack them on the street, or playing several minigames, including fully playable versions of Sega arcade games such as Out Run, Super Hang-On, Space Harrier, and Fantasy Zone. Completing certain objectives, such as eating every dish at a restaurant or reaching a target score in a minigame, will also grant the player special Completion Point currency; these Completion Points can be spent at a shrine to receive additional bonuses, such as special items or character upgrades.

The character leveling system is similar to the system from Ryu ga Gotoku Ishin!, with abilities bought off of a skill tree that is gradually unlocked during the game. Instead of using experience points to buy skills, the player uses money acquired from fights or side activities. Money is more liberally awarded in Yakuza 0 than in previous entries, with every heavy attack causing enemies to drop cash. Because of this, items, including healing items, in shopping centres are generally more expensive. The player can lose their money if they encounter special enemies called Mr. Shakedown, who are more difficult compared to average street enemies. If the player is beaten, they will lose all their cash, but can beat the enemy again to earn back their money, with a bonus for defeating him.

Kiryu and Majima also have side businesses that they run during the game to farm money: Kiryu invests in real estate in Kamurochō, while Majima runs a cabaret club in Sotenbori. Completing side-quests will often result in characters they meet offering to help with side businesses, allowing players to more easily and quickly progress. Progressing in side business sequences or training with specific masters will unlock additional abilities for purchase on the characters' skill trees.

A major innovation of Yakuza 0 is the addition of multiple fighting styles for both Kiryu and Majima that can be switched in the middle of battle. Kiryu utilizes the balanced Brawler style, similar to that of previous entries; the powerful but slow Beast style, which allows him to use heavy weapons; and the fast boxing-based Rush style, which emphasizes mobility. Conversely, Majima uses the balanced Thug style; the weapons-oriented Slugger style, primarily focused around a baseball bat; and the capoeira and breakdancing-based Breaker style. Completing Kiryu and Majima's side businesses will unlock an additional "Legend" fighting style for the characters, the "Dragon of Dojima" and "Mad Dog of Shimano" styles, respectively.

== Plot ==
=== Characters and settings ===
Yakuza 0 takes place from December 1988 to January 1989, during the bubble era of Japan, in which real estate and stock market prices were greatly inflated. The two central protagonists of the game are Kazuma Kiryu (Takaya Kuroda/Yong Yea), (Note: Topher Ngo is Kazuma Kiryu's singing voice for the English dub in the Director's Cut.) a junior Tojo Clan yakuza in Kamurochō who is forced out of the clan due to a murder accusation, and Goro Majima (Hidenari Ugaki/Matthew Mercer), a disgraced former Tojo Clan yakuza who works as a cabaret manager in Sotenbori to earn his way back into the clan. Both protagonists are drawn into a conflict surrounding the "Empty Lot", a small piece of land in Kamurochō that the Tojo Clan wishes to acquire for redevelopment of the area. At the center of the controversy is Makoto Makimura (Miyuki Sawashiro/Risa Mei), a psychogenically induced blind woman who inherited ownership of the Lot.

Throughout the story, Kiryu and Majima are supported by several allies, including: Akira Nishikiyama (Kazuhiro Nakaya/Kaiji Tang), (Note: Greg Chun is Akira Nishikiyama's singing voice for the English dub in the Director's Cut.) Kiryu's oath brother; Osamu Kashiwagi (Shunsuke Sakuya/David Hayter), captain of the Kazama Family; Shintaro Kazama (Tetsuya Watari/Paul Nakauchi), patriarch of the Kazama Family and a father figure to Kiryu and Nishikiyama; Tetsu Tachibana (Arata Iura/Howard Wang), president of a real estate company who offers to shelter Kiryu from the wrath of the Tojo Clan; Jun Oda (Katsuyuki Konishi/Alejandro Saab), Tachibana's right-hand man; Reina (Hiromi Tsuru/Michelle Wong), proprietor of the bar Serena and a friend of Nishikiyama; Wen Hai Lee (Kazunari Tanaka/Bill Millsap), a former assassin who owns a massage parlor in Sotenbori; Billiken (Ryohei Nakao/Adam Gold), an Osakan detective associated with Nishitani; Takashi Nihara (Hidekatsu Shibata/Frank Todaro), acting second chairman of the Tojo Clan; and Masaru Sera (Tōru Ōkawa/Nobi Nakanishi), a senior Tojo Clan officer who runs a secret black ops organization within the clan.

The primary antagonist of Yakuza 0 is the Dojima Family, a yakuza family within the Tojo Clan, whose patriarch, Sohei Dojima (Hisao Egawa/Imari Williams), seeks to become the next clan chairman and seize power. Under Dojima's command are his three lieutenants: Daisaku Kuze (Hitoshi Ozawa/Keston John), Hiroki Awano (Riki Takeuchi/Eliah Mountjoy), and Keiji Shibusawa (Hideo Nakano/Jon Ohye), who assist in Dojima's plan by tracking down the Empty Lot's owner and taking out Kiryu and Majima, who oppose them. Other antagonists include: Tsukasa Sagawa (Shingo Tsurumi/Andrew Kishino), a high-ranking Omi Alliance officer who supervises Majima in Sotenbori; Homare Nishitani (Keiji Fujiwara/Vic Chao), a sadomasochistic Omi Alliance officer who is attracted to Majima and often taunts him; Futoshi Shimano (Naomi Kusumi/Fred Tatasciore), Majima's former superior in the Tojo Clan and Sagawa's oath brother; and also Lao Gui (Koji Suzuki), (Note: Sam Lee portrays Lao Gui in the Chinese version of the game.) a Chinese assassin hired by Dojima to frame Kiryu in the Empty Lot murder.

=== Synopsis ===
In December 1988, yakuza Kazuma Kiryu is framed for murder in an empty lot in Kamurochō, Tokyo. As the Empty Lot is the last piece of land needing to be purchased for the Tojo Clan's redevelopment plan, it becomes the target of Dojima Family patriarch Sohei Dojima, believing obtaining it will grant him enough power and influence to become Tojo Clan chairman. In order to protect his adoptive father, Shintaro Kazama, from punishment for the death, Kiryu leaves the Dojima Family after a fight with Daisaku Kuze, a lieutenant of the Dojima family.

Kiryu meets real estate agent Tetsu Tachibana, who promises to clear his name in exchange for helping him acquire the Empty Lot before Dojima. After Kiryu and Jun Oda, Tachibana's right-hand man, interfere with squatters related to the Dojima family, Kuze and other Dojima lieutenants Hiroki Awano and Keiji Shibusawa demand Kiryu turn over Tachibana. Kiryu refuses, prompting the Dojima family to hunt him down. His oath brother Akira Nishikiyama cuts ties with Kiryu to keep each other safe. Tachibana tells Kiryu that the Empty Lot's owner is his estranged sister, Makoto Makimura, who inherited it from their grandfather and lives in Sotenbori, Osaka.

In Sotenbori, ex-yakuza Goro Majima is forced to run a cabaret club, as punishment for his involvement in the Ueno-Seiwa assassination in 1985. (Note: As depicted in the flashback segments of Yakuza 4.) Per the orders of his former patriarch Futoshi Shimano, Majima is under constant surveillance by Shimano's oath brother, Tsukasa Sagawa, a member of the Omi Alliance, the Tojo Clan's rivals. Following a new order from Shimano, Sagawa offers Majima a chance to rejoin the Shimano Family by assassinating Makoto, who suffers from psychogenic blindness.

Majima finds Makoto under the protection of Wen Hai Lee, a former assassin. After Majima decides to protect Makoto, Lee suggests murdering a look-alike of Makoto to fool Sagawa. Though Majima rejects the idea, Shibusawa's assistant Homare Nishitani commits the deed in his place, hoping to attract Majima's attention. Suspecting the fraud, Sagawa sends his men to kill Majima and Makoto. Sagawa sets up a trap to kill Lee, (Note: The Director's Cut reveals that Lee managed to survive with severe injuries, and had an uncertain life expectancy.) then attempts to kill Majima and Makoto, but is stopped by Masaru Sera, an ally of Kazama, who takes Makoto away. Following a lengthy investigation, Majima and Sagawa confront Sera at his headquarters and find that he turned Makoto over to Kiryu.

Kiryu and Oda escort Makoto to Kamurochō but are chased by Shibusawa's men. Oda, revealed to be a mole for Shibusawa, attempts to kill Kiryu and Makoto. After being subdued by Kiryu, Oda explains that he and Tachibana were former Chinese gangsters in Japan. At that time, Makoto migrated to Japan to find her brother, but ran afoul of Oda, who sold her to a Korean gang, where she was sexually abused, causing her to suffer from psychogenically-induced blindness. Oda discovered Makoto's identity after Tachibana saw her on a documentary, and feared his reprisal ever since. Regretting his crimes, he allows Kiryu and Makoto to flee, before being executed by Shibusawa.

Kiryu meets Tachibana, who reveals that he knew that Makoto was looking for him. He also reveals that upon learning her inheritance of the Empty Lot, he turned to Kazama, who helped him form his company to protect Makoto from Dojima, who also planned to annihilate the Kazama Family. With their interests coinciding, Kiryu and Tachibana flee but Tachibana is captured by Dojima's assassin, Lao Gui, the true perpetrator of the Empty Lot murder. Tachibana is then tortured to death by Dojima Family member Yoneda, acting on behalf of Kuze with orders, and his men, whom Kiryu and Nishikiyama defeat. Makoto discovers her brother's body and regains partial sight.

Meanwhile, Majima learns that Shimano sent the kill order so that Majima would be pressured to have Makoto willingly hand over the Empty Lot to Shimano. Majima finds Makoto in the Empty Lot, plotting revenge for Tachibana's death. Despite Majima's concerns, Makoto meets Dojima, offering the Empty Lot in exchange for the deaths of his lieutenants. Dojima declines and has her shot. Sera arrives and escorts Makoto to a hospital. However, Shibusawa finds Makoto and holds her captive on a ship. Kiryu and his allies storm the ship and save Makoto, whilst Majima battles the Dojima family in the Tojo HQ, including Awano who dies at Lao Gui's hands when trying to shield Majima from the latter's attack. Nishikiyama prevents Kiryu from killing Shibusawa, and both him and Kuze are handed over to the police. Majima defeats Lao Gui for framing up Kiryu and prepares to kill Dojima, but is stopped by Sera, who has ultimately acquired the deeds to the Empty Lot. He orders Majima to kill Shimano for his treachery, but upon confronting Shimano, Majima relents, wanting to learn the fate of his oath brother Taiga Saejima. Shimano terminates his dealings with the Omi Alliance and reinstates Majima into his family.

In January 1989, Sera becomes the Tojo Clan Captain (and later Third Chairman), with Dojima languishing after the loss of his lieutenants. Kiryu rejoins the Dojima Family under a new oath, hoping to find his own path as a yakuza. Meanwhile, Majima adopts a new persona, inspired by Lee, Nishitani and Sagawa, to empower himself, and bids Sagawa farewell, who is later executed by the Omi Alliance for his failure to secure a deal with Shimano. Majima watches Makoto enjoy a peaceful life with her new boyfriend, and later encounters Kiryu for the first time in Kamurochō.

== Development ==
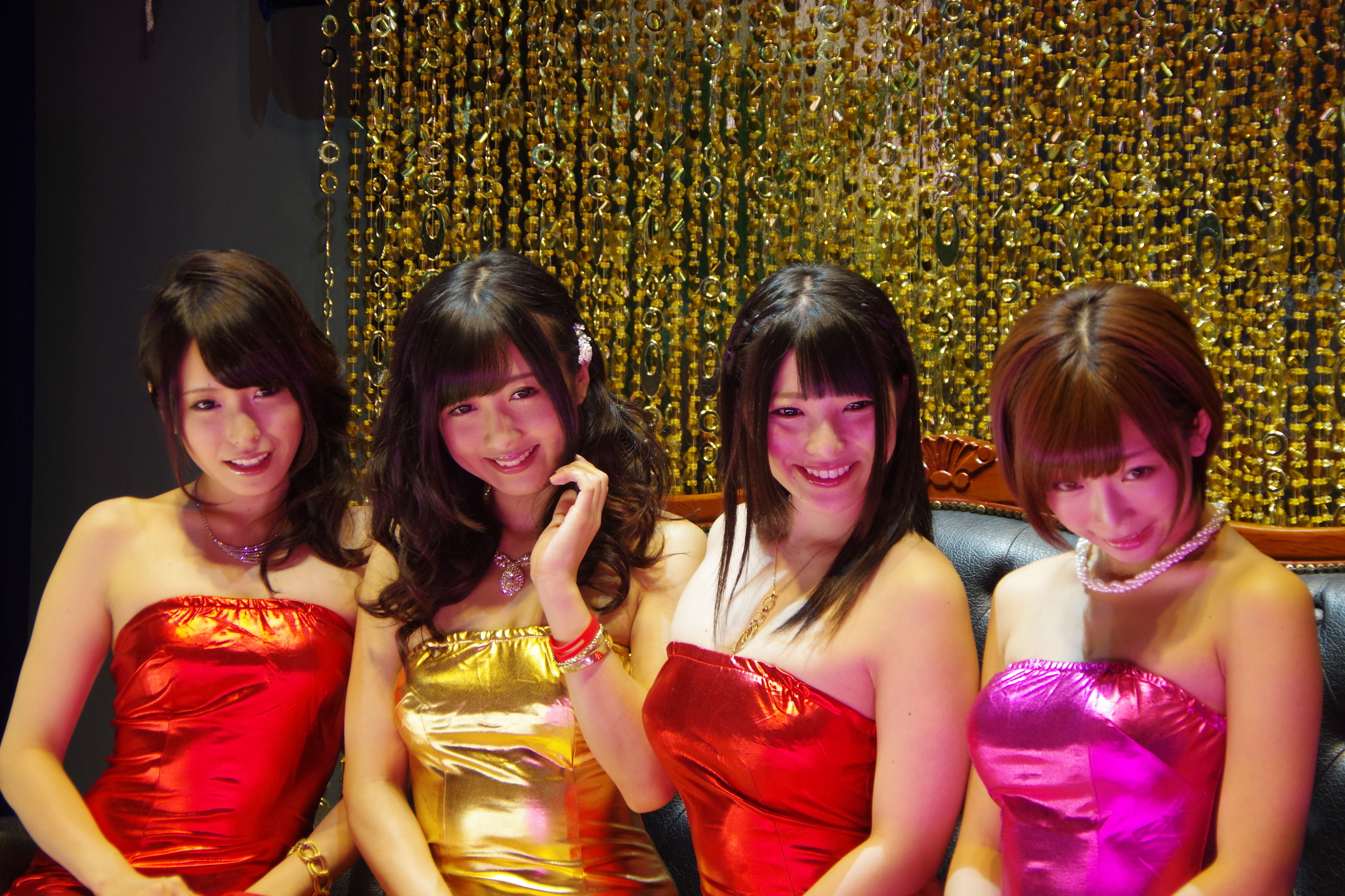
The top four most-voted AV idols in Sega's booth at Tokyo Game Show 2014. Left to right: Chika Arimura, Hibiki Ōtsuki, Ai Uehara and Mana Sakura.

The game was first announced in a special Yakuza event on 24 August 2014, together with a trailer. Thirty most popular AV idols, as voted by fans in an earlier poll, were also announced to make anachronistic cameo appearances in the game, with the top 10 having more significant roles (the top five would appear as the highest tier hostesses in the cabaret club minigame). A Chinese-language localization of the game was announced in 2014 and eventually released in Asia in May 2015. Shonan no Kaze performed the game's main theme and ending theme, "Bubble" (バブル) and "Kurenai" (紅, Crimson) respectively; these songs were not licensed for the English release and were instead replaced by original instrumental tracks. This was due to the licensing issues.

Sega wanted to make Majima stand out from Kiryu, as the two share the role of protagonists. Sega described Kiryu as a "straight man trait – tough but honorable and keeps to himself a bit" implying little difficulty in writing him. Through this game and the remake of the first game, Kiwami, the relationship between Kiryu and Majima is explored further than in the first game of the franchise, most notably because of changes to Majima's characterization and his views on Kiryu's actions, with the two being friends and enemies simultaneously. Yakuza 0 also showed a part of Kiryu's story that Sega wanted players to know before Yakuza 6. Kiryu's traits in Yakuza 0 were specifically changed to a "loose-cannon hot-head" to the point long time fans would be surprised by his actions. However, chief producer Masayoshi Yokoyama stated the character would mature across the storyline. The goal of the localization team was to make Majima and Kiryu more likeable, although Strichart believed Kiryu was more popular than Majima in Western countries. Despite Kiryu's fame, Sato noted that players ended up enjoying Majima far more in the franchise.

A free accompanying game application for PlayStation Vita, titled Yakuza 0: Free to Play Application for PlayStation Vita, (Note: Ryū ga Gotoku 0: Free to Play Application for PlayStation Vita (龍が如く0 基本無料アプリ for PlayStation Vita)) was released in Japan in February 2015.

The Chinese localization of the game replaces late-game character Lao Gui, a Chinese assassin hired by the Dojima Family, with the face model and voice of Hong Kong actor Sam Lee.

On 5 December 2015, at PlayStation Experience in San Francisco, Sony Computer Entertainment's Gio Corsi announced that Yakuza 0 would be coming to the Americas for the PlayStation 4. Initially, no official confirmation was made of a European release. In July 2016, it was announced that the game would release in North America and Europe for the PlayStation 4 in January 2017.

Western localization of the game was led by Scott Strichart, associate producer of Atlus USA, who has localized Yakuza Kiwami, Yakuza Kiwami 2, and Yakuza 6. The team took a year and a half to localize Yakuza 0, which has 1.8 million Japanese characters, nearly twice as many as the average JRPG, which has 1 to 1.2 million Japanese characters. In addition to challenges translating tone and humor, Strichart's team at Atlus had difficulties localizing traditional Asian games, including Mahjong and Shogi. In order to make these minigames accessible to Western audiences, Atlus had to provide detailed rules alongside gameplay. During the localization process, Strichart said the team wrote a total of "34 pages of Mahjong explanation."

A PC port of the game featured English and Japanese languages, along with Traditional Chinese and Korean languages that are exclusive to the Microsoft Store version.

=== Yakuza 0 Director's Cut ===
Yakuza 0 Director's Cut was announced as a timed exclusive for the Nintendo Switch 2 during a Nintendo Direct presentation on April 2, 2025. It was released on June 5, 2025 as a launch title for the console. It features new cutscenes, English and Chinese voiceover dubs, an online multiplayer mode titled Red Light Raid, and French, German, Italian, Spanish and Simplified Chinese localization, as well as additional localizations in Latin American Spanish, Brazilian Portuguese and Russian via a title update to coincide with the release on other consoles. It also features the licensed tracks from the Japanese version. Yakuza 0 Director's Cut runs at a locked 60 frames per second on the Nintendo Switch 2. In terms of resolution, Yakuza 0 Director's Cut runs at a 4K resolution in TV mode when using a Nintendo Switch 2.

During the RGG Summit on September 24, 2025, it was announced the remaster would release on other platforms on December 8, 2025, which included pre-rendered cutscenes at 60fps.

== Reception ==
=== Critical response ===
Reception

Aggregate scores
Aggregator	Score
Metacritic	PS4: 85/100; PC: 86/100; XONE: 90/100; NS2 (Director's Cut): 85/100
OpenCritic	95% recommended 94% recommend(Director's Cut) (Note: Based on 53 reviews)

Review scores
Publication	Score
Computer Games Magazine	9/10
Destructoid	9/10
Easy Allies	4/5
Electronic Gaming Monthly	2/5
Famitsu	36/40
Game Informer	9.25/10
GameSpot	8/10
GamesRadar+	4/5
IGN	8.5/10
PlayStation Official Magazine – UK	90/100
Polygon	8/10
RPGFan	85/100
PlayStation LifeStyle	9/10
The Independent	4/5
The Jimquisition	9.5/10

Yakuza 0 received "generally favorable" reviews from critics, with the Xbox One version receiving "universal acclaim", according to review aggregator Metacritic. Of 153 critic reviews on review aggregator OpenCritic, 95% have recommended Yakuza 0, with a top critic average of 86/100.

PlayStation LifeStyle's review of the import version was a 9/10, calling it the best in the series and "the result of 10 years spent not just perfecting a formula, but adding to it." The game received a 36/40 from Famitsu on both platforms. Eurogamer ranked the game 45th on their list of the "Top 50 Games of 2017", while Polygon ranked it 44th on their list of the 50 best games of 2017, and The Verge named it as one of their 15 Best Video Games of 2017.

The game's fighting system has often been praised for its brutality, though IGN felt it might come across as too simple due to players' tendencies to mash buttons. GameInformer compared the random battles with arcade beat em up games and praised the usage of its grinding system as its usage is needed due to how challenging every character is across later chapters. GameSpot was critical to the gameplay, calling it dated as he remarked that, despite gameplay improvements from the PlayStation 3 games, there is still occasional poor performance. Nevertheless, the reviewer enjoyed the fighting system and the grinding aspects, finding them more entertaining. PlayStation Life Style praised the encounters with minor characters as well as the heat function for the cinematic movements Kiryu and Majima perform although he felt they were barely stronger than normal moves. The cabaret club minigame was particularly praised as "addictive" and "the best part" of the game.

Reviewers also commented on the story and cast, most notably due to its accessibility as a prequel. Majima's different characterization had some writers find him more interesting than Kiryu. EGMNOW liked the contrast the duo had in the narrative. The Jimquisition called both characters "like-able protagonists who consistently have to act as straight men in a variety of weird situations". GamesRadar praised the constant switch between protagonists, as it "helps to refresh the narrative". Polygon had mixed feelings in regards to the cast as the antagonist often end up becoming trustworthy regardless of violent acts as well as the fact that most female characters are poorly treated both in the main narrative and minigames. GameSpot felt the story was the greatest strength of the game, due to its handling of cutscenes, serious storytelling and appealing voice acting. Despite finding that the game carried many common scenarios from the previous games, PlayStation LifeStyle said that Yakuza 0 has the best narrative in the entire series, praising elements such as the fast pace and the 1980s portrayal.

Yakuza 0 Director's Cut received a 9/10 from Nintendo Life, who praised the game's visuals and performance, new story content and the high quality of its main narrative and side content, calling it "easily the best traditional Yakuza game, and perfect for newcomers", though criticised its English dub as "surprisingly poor" as well as its fighting for being "a little repetitive". Hardcore Gamer gave Yakuza 0 Director's Cut a 4.5/5 and also credited the game's performance and new cutscenes, as well as liking that game progress can now be saved at any location and that the game can run at 60 frames per second (fps) with 4K resolution support, though critiqued its lack of accessibility options. Nintendo World Report gave Yakuza 0 Director's Cut an 8.5/10 listing pros such as the game's combat, sidestories and minigames, though said that "the story is better off without the new cutscenes". HobbyConsolas gave Yakuza 0 Director's Cut a score of 83/100, crediting the version of the game for being able to be played in Spanish but said it could have more quality of life options.

=== Sales ===
The game debuted at number 1 on the Japan software chart in its first week of release. The PlayStation 3 and the PlayStation 4 version sold 146,000 units and 90,000 sales respectively. As of June 2015, the game has sold over 500,000 copies within Japan and Asia. Sega president Haruki Satomi stated that the Chinese version of the game sold more than originally expected.

In the UK, Yakuza 0 was the 8th top selling game in the week of 28 January. Stock for the game was running low, which indicated the game sold far beyond expectations.

=== Accolades ===
The Japanese version of Yakuza 0 won a Japan Game Awards Award for Excellence in the Future Division (for pre-release games showcased at the Tokyo Game Show) in 2014. The game was nominated for "Best PS4 Game" in Destructoid's Game of the Year Awards 2017, and for "Best Action-Adventure Game" in IGN's Best of 2017 Awards; it also became a runner-up for "Best Style" in Giant Bomb's 2017 Game of the Year Awards. The game won the award for "Best Main Character" (Goro Majima) in Game Informer's 2017 game of the Year Awards.

Year	Award	Category	Result	Ref.
2017	Golden Joystick Awards	PlayStation Game of the Year	Nominated	
2018	National Academy of Video Game Trade Reviewers Awards	Game, Franchise Action	Nominated	
2018	National Academy of Video Game Trade Reviewers Awards	Original Light Mix Score, Franchise	Nominated	
