= Yoon Kyung-ah =

South Korean television screenwriter

- Born: South Korea
- Occupation: Screenwriter
- Years active: 2010-present

Korean name
- Hangul: 윤경아
- RR: Yun Gyeonga
- MR: Yun Kyŏnga

Yoon Kyung-ah (Korean: 윤경아) is a South Korean television screenwriter.

== Career ==
For her first television drama, Yoon Kyung-ah adapted the manga Dragon Zakura, which was previously adapted into a Japanese drama in 2005. Master of Study (also known as God of Study, 2010) is about a determined lawyer who takes up a teaching position at a failing high school. To save the school from the axe, he comes up with the unconventional plan of starting a special class curriculum devoted to getting the school's five worst students into the country's top university. It starred Kim Soo-ro, Bae Doona, and Oh Yoon-ah as the teachers, and Yoo Seung-ho, Go Ah-sung, Lee Hyun-woo, Park Ji-yeon, and Lee Chan-ho as the students. Manga artist Norifusa Mita said he was satisfied with the Korean adaptation because "the characters have depth," calling the series "energetic and entertaining." The high school drama reached viewership ratings of 26.8% and topped its timeslot for most of its run.

Yoon reunited with Master of Study director Yoo Hyun-ki for Brain (2011-2012), saying they chose the topic of neurosurgery because they wanted to tell a story about the human mind. In order to write realistic episodes, Yoon spent two months at a hospital interviewing doctors, nurses and patients. On set, a professor of neurosurgery and a head nurse with 27 years of experience also served as consultants. The series was actor Shin Ha-kyun's first network drama in eight years and his portrayal of an arrogant and ambitious second-year fellow striving to succeed to overcome his underprivileged background brought him critical praise and renewed mainstream popularity, winning him the Daesang ("Grand Prize") at the 2011 KBS Drama Awards. Brain also starred Choi Jung-won, Jo Dong-hyuk and Jung Jin-young.

Yoon returned to the medical drama genre in 2013 with Medical Top Team, about doctors at the top of their respective fields/specialties gathered together on one team. Directed by Kim Do-hoon (who previously helmed hit period drama Moon Embracing the Sun), it starred Kwon Sang-woo, Jung Ryeo-won, Ju Ji-hoon, Oh Yeon-seo, and Choi Minho.

== Filmography ==
- Medical Top Team (MBC, 2013)
- Brain (KBS2, 2011-2012)
- Master of Study (KBS2, 2010)
