= List of programs broadcast by the Korean Broadcasting System =

This is a list of programs broadcast on South Korean terrestrial television channels KBS1 and KBS2 of the Korean Broadcasting System (KBS) network.

== Dramas ==
KBS prime-time flagship dramas are broadcast on KBS2 at 21:50, generally with two series airing simultaneously, with each series airing on two consecutive nights: Monday–Tuesday and Wednesday–Thursday; and on KBS1 at 20:30 every weekdays and at 20:40 on Saturdays, following the weekend edition of KBS News 9.

=== Color Legend ===
Off-Air On-Air Upcoming

=== KBS2 Monday–Tuesday ===
==== 1990s ====
Year	English title	Korean title
1994	Salut D'Amour	사랑의 인사
1998	Until the Azalea Blooms	
1999	Invitation	초대
1999	Magic Castle	마법의 성

==== 2000s ====
Year	English title	Korean title
2000	She's the One	나는 그녀가 좋다
2000	Look Back in Anger	성난 얼굴로 돌아보라
2000	Foolish Love	바보같은 사랑
2000	RNA	RNA
2000	Autumn in My Heart	가을동화
2000–2001	Snowflakes	눈꽃
2000–2001	Pretty Lady	귀여운 여인
2000–2001	Stock Flower	비단향꽃무
2000–2001	Life Is Beautiful	인생은 아름다워
2000–2001	Cool	쿨
2000–2001	Pure Heart	순정
2000–2001	Mina	미나
2002	Winter Sonata	겨울연가
2002	Sunshine Hunting	햇빛 사냥
2002	Hard Love	거침없는 사랑
2002	Loving You	러빙유
2002	Children of Heaven	천국의 아이들
2002	Solitude	고독
2003	The Wife	아내
2003	Summer Scent	여름향기
2003	Sang Doo! Let's Go to School	상두야, 학교가자!
2003–2004	She is the Best	그녀는 짱
2004	Sweet 18	낭랑18세
2004	Taste Sweet Love	백설공주
2004	Beijing, My Love	북경, 내 사랑
2004	Forbidden Love	구미호외전
2004	Oh Feel Young	오!필승 봉순영
2004	I'm Sorry, I Love You	미안하다, 사랑한다
2005	Sassy Girl Chun-hyang	쾌걸 춘향
2005	Eighteen, Twenty-Nine	열여덟, 스물아홉
2005	Loveholic	러브홀릭
2005	Ice Girl	그녀가 돌아왔다
2005	Wedding	웨딩
2005	A Love to Kill	이 죽일 놈의 사랑
2006	Hello God	안녕하세요 하느님
2006	Spring Waltz	봄의 왈츠
2006	Mr. Goodbye	미스터 굿바이
2006	The Vineyard Man	포도밭 그사나이
2006	Cloud Stairs	구름계단
2006–2007	The Snow Queen	눈의 여왕
2007	When Spring Comes	꽃피는 봄이오면
2007	Hello! Miss	헬로 애기씨
2007	Flowers For My Life	꽃 찾으러 왔단다
2007	Conspiracy in the Court	한성별곡
2007	I Am Sam	아이엠샘
2007	Evasive Inquiry Agency	얼렁뚱땅 흥신소
2007	Cruel Love	못된 사랑
2008	Single Dad in Love	싱글파파는 열애중
2008	Formidable Rivals	강적들
2008	Strongest Chil Woo	최강칠우
2008	Love Marriage	연애결혼
2008	Worlds Within	그들이 사는 세상
2009	Boys Over Flowers	꽃보다 남자
2009	The Slingshot	남자이야기
2009	He Who Can't Marry	결혼 못하는 남자
2009	Korean Ghost Stories	전설의 고향
2009	The Queen Returns	공주가 돌아왔다
2009	Invincible Lee Pyung Kang	천하무적 이평강

==== 2010s ====
Year	English title	Korean title
2010	Master of Study	공부의 신
2010	Becoming a Billionaire	부자의 탄생
2010	Secret Agent Miss Oh	국가가 부른다
2010	Grudge: The Revolt of Gumiho	구미호: 여우누이뎐
2010	Sungkyunkwan Scandal	성균관 스캔들
2010	Marry Me, Mary!	매리는 외박중
2011	Dream High	드림하이
2011	Detectives in Trouble	강력반
2011	Baby Faced Beauty	동안미녀
2011	Spy Myung-wol	스파이 명월
2011	Poseidon	포세이돈
2011–2012	Brain	브레인
2012	Dream High 2	드림하이 2
2012	Love Rain	사랑비
2012	Big	빅
2012	Lovers of Haeundae	해운대 연인들
2012	Ohlala Couple	울랄라 부부
2012–2013	School 2013	학교 2013
2013	Ad Genius Lee Tae-baek	광고천재 이태백
2013	The Queen of Office	직장의 신
2013	Don't Look Back: The Legend of Orpheus	상어
2013	Good Doctor	굿 닥터
2013	Marry Him If You Dare	미래의 선택
2013–2014	Prime Minister & I	총리와 나
2014	Beyond the Clouds	태양은 가득히
2014	Big Man	빅맨
2014	Lovers of Music	트로트의 연인
2014	Discovery of Love	연애의 발견
2014	Naeil's Cantabile	내일도 칸타빌레
2014	Healer	힐러
2015	Blood	블러드
2015	Who Are You: School 2015	학교 2015
2015	Hello Monster	너를 기억해
2015	The Virtual Bride	별난 며느리
2015	Cheer Up!	발칙하게 고고
2015–2016	Oh My Venus	오 마이 비너스
2016	Moorim School: Saga of the Brave	무림학교
2016	Babysitter	베이비시터
2016	My Lawyer, Mr. Jo	동네 변호사 조들호
2016	Becky's Back	백희가 돌아왔다
2016	A Beautiful Mind	뷰티풀 마인드
2016	Love in the Moonlight	구르미 그린 달빛
2016	Sweet Stranger and Me	우리집에 사는 남자
2016	Hwarang: The Poet Warrior Youth	화랑
2017	Ms. Perfect	완벽한 아내
2017	The Happy Loner	개인주의자 지영씨
2017	Fight for My Way	쌈 마이웨이
2017	School 2017	학교 2017
2017	Girls' Generation 1979	란제리 소녀시대
2017	Witch at Court	마녀의 법정
2017	Jugglers	저글러스
2018	Radio Romance	라디오 로맨스
2018	The Miracle We Met	우리가 만난 기적
2018	Are You Human?	너도 인간이니
2018	Lovely Horribly	러블리 호러블리
2018	Matrimonial Chaos	최고의 이혼
2018	Just Dance	땐뽀걸즈
2019	My Lawyer, Mr. Jo 2: Crime and Punishment	동네 변호사 조들호 2
2019	My Fellow Citizens!	국민 여러분
2019	Perfume	퍼퓸
2019	I Wanna Hear Your Song	너의 노래를 들려줘
2019	The Tale of Nokdu	조선로코 녹두전

==== 2020s ====
Year	English title	Korean title
2020	How to Buy a Friend	계약우정
2020	Born Again	본 어게인
2020	Men Are Men	그놈이 그놈이다
2020	Zombie Detective	좀비탐정
2020–2021	Royal Secret Agent	암행어사
2021	River Where the Moon Rises	달이 뜨는 강
2021	Youth of May	오월의 청춘
2021	At a Distance, Spring Is Green	멀리서 보면 푸른 봄
2021	Police University	경찰수업
2021	The King's Affection	연모
2021–2022	Moonshine	꽃 피면 달 생각하고
2022	Crazy Love	크레이지 러브
2022	Bloody Heart	붉은 단심
2022	Café Minamdang	미남당
2022	The Law Cafe	법대로 사랑하라
2022	Curtain Call	커튼콜
2023	Brain Works	두뇌공조
2023	Oasis	오아시스
2023	My Perfect Stranger	어쩌다 마주친, 그대
2023	Heartbeat	가슴이 뛴다
2023	My Lovely Boxer	순정복서
2023	The Matchmakers	혼례대첩
2024	Love Song for Illusion	환상연가
2024	Nothing Uncovered	멱살 한번 잡힙시다
2024	Dare to Love Me	함부로 대해줘

=== KBS2 Wednesday–Thursday ===
==== 1990s ====
Year	English title	Korean title
1996	Papa	파파

==== 2000s ====
Year	English title	Korean title
2001	Empress Myeongseong	명성황후
2002	Man of the Sun, Lee Je-ma	태양인 이제마
2002	Jang Hee Bin	장희빈
2003	Rosemary	로즈마리
2004	More Beautiful Than a Flower	꽃보다 아름다워
2004	April Kiss	4월 키스
2004	Full House	풀하우스
2004	Second Proposal	두번째 프러포즈
2004	Emperor of the Sea	해신
2005	Resurrection	부활
2005	My Rosy Life	장밋빛 인생
2005	Golden Apple	황금사과
2006	Goodbye Solo	굿바이솔로
2006	Great Inheritance	위대한 유산
2006	The Invisible Man	투명인간 최장수
2006	Special Crime Investigation: Murder in the Blue House	특수수사일지: 1호관 사건
2006	Fugitive Lee Doo-yong	도망자 이두용
2006	Hwang Jini	황진이
2007	Dal-ja's Spring	달자의 봄
2007	Lucifer	마왕
2007	Several Questions That Make Us Happy	우리를 행복하게 하는 몇 가지 질문
2007	Capital Scandal	경성스캔들
2007	Six Martyred Ministers	사육신
2007	In-soon Is Pretty	인순이는 예쁘다
2008	Hong Gil-dong	쾌도 홍길동
2008	One Mom and Three Dads	아빠셋 엄마하나
2008	Women in the Sun	태양의 여자
2008	Korean Ghost Stories	전설의 고향
2008–2009	The Kingdom of the Winds	바람의 나라
2009	My Dad Loves Trouble	경숙이 경숙아버지
2009	Again, My Love	미워도 다시 한 번 2009
2009	The Accidental Couple	그저 바라 보다가
2009	The Partner	파트너
2009	My Fair Lady	아가씨를 부탁해
2009	Iris	아이리스

==== 2010s ====
Year	English title	Korean title
2010	The Slave Hunters	추노
2010	Cinderella's Stepsister	신데렐라 언니
2010	Bread, Love and Dreams	제빵왕 김탁구
2010	The Fugitive: Plan B	도망자: Plan B
2010–2011	The President	프레지던트
2011	The Thorn Birds	가시나무새
2011	Romance Town	로맨스 타운
2011	The Princess' Man	공주의 남자
2011	Glory Jane	영광의 재인
2012	Wild Romance	난폭한 로맨스
2012	Just an Ordinary Love Story	보통의 연애
2012	Man from the Equator	적도의 남자
2012	Bridal Mask	각시탈
2012	The Innocent Man	세상 어디에도 없는 착한 남자
2012–2013	Jeon Woo-chi	전우치
2013	Iris II: New Generation	아이리스 2
2013	The Fugitive of Joseon	천명
2013	The Blade and Petal	칼과 꽃
2013	Secret Love	비밀
2013–2014	Bel Ami	예쁜 남자
2014	Inspiring Generation	감격시대
2014	Golden Cross	골든 크로스
2014	Gunman in Joseon	조선총잡이
2014	Blade Man	아이언맨
2014–2015	The King's Face	왕의 얼굴
2015	Unkind Ladies	착하지 않은 여자들
2015	The Man in the Mask	복면검사
2015	Assembly	어셈블리
2015–2016	The Merchant: Gaekju 2015	장사의 신 – 객주 2015
2016	Descendants of the Sun	태양의 후예
2016	The Master of Revenge	마스터 – 국수의 신
2016	Uncontrollably Fond	함부로 애틋하게
2016	On the Way to the Airport	공항 가는 길
2016–2017	My Fair Lady	오 마이 금비
2017	Naked Fireman	맨몸의 소방관
2017	Good Manager	김과장
2017	Queen of Mystery	추리의 여왕
2017	Queen for Seven Days	7일의 왕비
2017	Manhole	맨홀: 이상한 나라의 필
2017	Mad Dog	매드독
2017–2018	Black Knight: The Man Who Guards Me	흑기사
2018	Queen of Mystery 2	추리의 여왕 2
2018	Suits	슈츠
2018	Your House Helper	당신의 하우스헬퍼
2018	The Ghost Detective	오늘의 탐정
2018	Feel Good to Die	죽어도 좋아
2019	Liver or Die	왜그래 풍상씨
2019	Doctor Prisoner	닥터 프리즈너
2019	Angel's Last Mission: Love	단, 하나의 사랑
2019	Justice	저스티스
2019	Birthday Letter	생일편지
2019	When the Camellia Blooms	동백꽃 필 무렵
2019–2020	Woman of 9.9 Billion	99억의 여자

==== 2020s ====
Year	English title	Korean title
2020	Forest	포레스트
2020	Welcome	어서와
2020	Soul Mechanic	영혼수선공
2020	Memorials	출사표
2020	Do Do Sol Sol La La Sol	도도솔솔라라솔
2020–2021	Cheat on Me If You Can	바람피면 죽는다
2021	Hello, Me!	안녕? 나야!
2021	Sell Your Haunted House	대박부동산
2021	Dali & Cocky Prince	달리와 감자탕
2021–2022	School 2021	학교 2021
2022	Love All Play	너에게 가는 속도 493 km
2022	Jinxed at First	징크스의 연인
2022	If You Wish Upon Me	당신의 소원을 말하면
2022	Bad Prosecutor	진검승부
2024	Perfect Family	완벽한 가족
2024	Dog Knows Everything	개소리
2024	Face Me	페이스 미
2024–2025	Who Is She	수상한 그녀
2025	Kick Kick Kick Kick	킥킥킥킥
2025	Villains Everywhere	빌런의 나라
2025	Pump Up the Healthy Love	24시 헬스클럽
2025	The First Night with the Duke	남주의 첫날밤을 가져버렸다
2025	My Girlfriend Is the Man!	내 여자친구는 상남자

==== Thursday ====
Year	English title	Korean title
2026	Cabbage Your Life	심우면 연리리

=== KBS2 Friday–Saturday ===
Year	English title	Korean title
2015	The Producers	프로듀사
2017	Hit the Top	최고의 한방
2017	Strongest Deliveryman	최강 배달꾼
2017	Go Back	고백부부

==== Friday ====
Year	English title	Korean title
2014	Hi! School: Love On	하이스쿨 – 러브온
2015	Spy	스파이
2015	Orange Marmalade	오렌지 마멀레이드
2021	Imitation	이미테이션

=== KBS2 Saturday–Sunday ===
==== 1990s ====
Year	English title	Korean title
1996–1997	First Love	첫사랑
1999	Love in 3 Colors	유정

==== 2000s ====
Year	English title	Korean title
2003	Bodyguard	보디가드
2004–2005	Precious Family	부모님 전상서
2007	A Happy Woman	행복한 여자
2007	The Golden Age of Daughters-in-Law	며느리 전성시대
2008	The Great King, Sejong	대왕세종
2008	Mom's Dead Upset	엄마가 뿔났다
2009	Empress Cheonchu	천추태후
2009	Hot Blood	열혈 장사꾼
2009	My Too Perfect Sons	솔약국집 아들들
2009–2010	Three Brothers	수상한 삼형제

==== 2010s ====
Year	English title	Korean title
2011–2012	Ojakgyo Family	오작교 형제들
2012	My Husband Got a Family	넝쿨째 굴러온 당신
2012–2013	Seoyoung, My Daughter	내 딸 서영이
2013	You Are the Best!	최고다 이순신
2013–2014	Wang's Family	왕가네 식구들
2014	Wonderful Days	참 좋은 시절
2014–2015	What Happens to My Family?	가족끼리 왜 이래
2015	House of Bluebird	파랑새의 집
2015–2016	All About My Mom	부탁해요 엄마
2016	Five Enough	아이가 다섯
2016–2017	The Gentlemen of Wolgyesu Tailor Shop	월계수 양복점 신사들
2017	My Father Is Strange	아버지가 이상해
2017–2018	My Golden Life	황금빛 내 인생
2018	Marry Me Now	같이 살래요
2018–2019	My Only One	하나뿐인 내편
2019	Mother of Mine	세상에서 제일 예쁜 내 딸
2019–2020	Beautiful Love, Wonderful Life	사랑은 뷰티풀 인생은 원터풀

==== 2020s ====
Year	English title	Korean title
2020	Once Again	한번 다녀왔습니다
2020–2021	Homemade Love Story	오! 삼광빌라!
2021	Revolutionary Sisters	오케이 광자매
2021–2022	Young Lady and Gentleman	신사와 아가씨
2022	It's Beautiful Now	현재는 아름다워
2022–2023	Three Bold Siblings	삼남매가 용감하게
2023	The Real Has Come!	진짜가 나타났다!
2023–2024	Live Your Own Life	효심이네 각자도생
2024	Beauty and Mr. Romantic	미녀와 순정남
2024–2025	Iron Family	다리미 패밀리
2025	For Eagle Brothers	독수리 오형제를 부탁해
2025–2026	Our Golden Days	화려한 날들
2026	Recipe for Love	사랑을 처방해 드립니다
2026	Love on the Menu	사랑이 온다

==== Saturday–Sunday miniseries ====
Year	English title	Korean title
2023–2024	Korea–Khitan War	고려 거란 전쟁
2025	Twelve	트웰브
2025	Walking on Thin Ice	은수좋은날
2025	Last Summer	마지막 썸머
2026	To My Beloved Thief	은애하는 도적님아
2026	The Husband	결혼의 완성
2026	A Love Other Than Yours	너 말고 다른 연애
2026	Sword & Silence	문무

=== KBS1 Saturday–Sunday ===
Inspired by Taiga drama from NHK of Japan, historical dramas began to air in 1981 with Daemyeong, a story about Hyojong of Joseon. The series usually airs about 50 minutes every Saturday and Sunday at 21:40.

==== 1980s ====
Year	English title	Korean title
1981	Daemyeong	대명
1982	Wind and Cloud	풍운
1983	Foundation of the Kingdom	개국
1984	Independence Gate	독립문
1985	Dawn	새벽
1986–1987	Windfall	노다지
1987	Yi-hwa	이화
1987–1989	Land	토지
1989–1990	And So Flows History	역사는 흐른다

==== 1990s ====
Year	English title	Korean title
1990	Dawn of the Day	여명의 그날
1991	The Royal Way	왕도 (드라마)
1991–1992	Flowers That Never Wilt	바람꽃은 시들지 않는다
1992–1993	Chronicles of the Three Kingdoms	삼국기
1993	The Break of Dawn	먼동
1995	Kim Gu	김구
1995–1996	Dazzling Dawn	찬란한 여명
1996–1998	Tears of the Dragon	용의 눈물
1998–2000	The King and the Queen	왕과 비

==== 2000s ====
Year	English title	Korean title
2000–2002	Taejo Wang Geon	태조 왕건
2002–2003	The Dawn of the Empire	제국의 아침
2003–2004	Age of Warriors	무인시대
2004–2005	Immortal Admiral Yi Sun-sin	불멸의 이순신
2006	Seoul 1945	서울 1945
2006–2007	Dae Jo-yeong	대조영
2008	The Great King, Sejong	대왕세종

==== 2010s ====
Year	English title	Korean title
2010	The Reputable Family	명가
2010	The Great Merchant	거상 김만덕
2010	Legend of the Patriots	전우
2010	Freedom Fighter, Lee Hoe-young	자유인 이회영
2010–2011	The King of Legend	근초고왕
2011–2012	Gwanggaeto, The Great Conqueror	광개토대왕
2012–2013	Dream of the Emperor	대왕의 꿈
2014	Jeong Do-jeon	정도전
2015	The Jingbirok: A Memoir of Imjin War	징비록
2016	Jang Yeong-sil	장영실

==== 2020s ====
Year	English title	Korean title
2021–2022	The King of Tears, Lee Bang-won	태종 이방원

=== KBS Daily dramas ===
==== KBS1 Daily dramas ====
- Hopefully the Sky (하늘 바라기; 1995)
- Blowing of the Wind (바람은 불어도; 1995–1996)
- Until We Can Love (사랑할때까지; 1996–1997)
- Because I Really (정 때문에; 1997–1998)
- As We Live Our Lives (살다보면; 1998)
- My Love by My Side (내사랑 내곁에; 1998–1999)
- Someone's House (사람의 집; 1999)
- Rising Sun, Rising Moon (해뜨고 달뜨고; 1999–2000)
- More Than Words Can Say (좋은걸 어떡해; 2000–2001)
- Tender Hearts (우리가 남인가요; 2001)
- This Is Love (사랑은 이런거야; 2001–2002)
- To Be with You (당신 옆이 좋아; 2002–2003)
- Yellow Handkerchief (노란 손수건; 2003)
- One Million Roses (백만송이 장미; 2003–2004)
- My Lovely Family (금쪽같은 내 새끼; 2004–2005)
- My Sweet Heart (어여쁜 당신; 2005)
- Bizarre Bunch (별난여자 별난남자; 2005–2006)
- Hearts of Nineteen (열아홉 순정; 2006–2007)
- Heaven & Earth (하늘만큼 땅만큼; 2007)
- Likeable or Not (미우나 고우나; 2007–2008)
- You Are My Destiny (너는 내 운명; 2008–2009)
- The Road Home (집으로 가는 길; 2009)
- Jolly Widows (다함께 차차차; 2009–2010)

===== 2010s =====
Year	English title	Korean title
2010	Happiness in the Wind	바람 불어 좋은 날
2010–2011	Smile Again	웃어라 동해야
2011	My Bittersweet Life	우리집 여자들
2011–2012	Just You	당신뿐이야
2012	The Moon and Stars for You	별도 달도 따줄게
2012–2013	Cheer Up, Mr. Kim!	힘내요 미스터 김
2013	A Tale of Two Sisters	지성이면 감천
2013–2014	Melody of Love	사랑은 노래를 타고
2014	My Dear Cat	고양이는 있다
2014–2015	You Are the Only One	당신만이 내사랑
2015	Save the Family	가족을 지켜라
2015–2016	Sweet Home, Sweet Honey	우리집 꿀단지
2017	Lovers in Bloom	무궁화 꽃이 피었습니다
2017–2018	Love Returns	미워도 사랑해
2018	Sunny Again Tomorrow	내일도 맑음
2018–2019	It's My Life	비켜라 운명아
2019	Home for Summer	여름아 부탁해
2019–2020	Unasked Family	꽃길만 걸어요

===== 2020s =====
Year	English title	Korean title
2020	Brilliant Heritage	기막힌 유산
2020–2021	No Matter What	누가 뭐래도
2021	Be My Dream Family	속아도 꿈결
2021–2022	The All-Round Wife	국가대표 와이프
2022	Bravo, My Life	으라차차 내 인생
2022–2023	The Love in Your Eyes	내 눈에 콩깍지
2023	Apple of My Eye	금이야 옥이야
2023–2024	Unpredictable Family	우당탕탕 패밀리
2024	Suji & Uri	수지맞은 우리
2024–2025	My Merry Marriage	결혼하자 맹꽁아!
2025	Good Luck!	대운을 잡아라
2025–2026	Marie and Her Three Daddies	마리와 별난 아빠들
2026	Our Happy Days	기쁜 우리 좋은 날
2026	Mission: Mompossible	엄마가 미쳤어요

==== KBS2 Daily dramas ====
===== 2000s =====
Year	English title	Korean title
2007–2008	Unstoppable Marriage	못말리는 결혼

===== 2010s =====
Year	English title	Korean title
2012	She's A Star	선녀가 필요해
2012–2013	Family	패밀리
2013	Pure Love	일말의 순정
2013–2014	Ruby Ring	루비 반지
2014	Angel's Revenge	천상여자
2014	Two Mothers	뻐꾸기 둥지
2014–2015	Love & Secret	달콤한 비밀
2015	Love on a Rooftop	오늘부터 사랑해
2015–2016	All Is Well	다 잘될 거야
2016	The Promise	천상의 약속
2016	Secrets of Women	여자의 비밀
2016–2017	First Love Again	다시, 첫사랑
2017	Unknown Woman	이름 없는 여자
2017–2018	The Secret of My Love	내 남자의 비밀
2018	Mysterious Personal Shopper	인형의 집
2018	Love to the End	끝까지 사랑
2019	Left-Handed Wife	왼손잡이 아내
2019	A Place In The Sun	태양의 계절
2019–2020	Gracious Revenge	우아한 모녀

===== 2020s =====
Year	English title	Korean title
2020	Fatal Promise	위험한 약속
2020–2021	Man in a Veil	비밀의 남자
2021	Miss Monte-Cristo	미스 몬테크리스토
2021	Red Shoes	빨강 구두
2021–2022	Love Twist	사랑의 꽈배기
2022	Gold Mask	황금 가면
2022–2023	Vengeance of the Bride	태풍의 신부
2023	Woman in a Veil	비밀의 여자
2023–2024	The Elegant Empire	우아한 제국
2024	The Two Sisters	피도 눈물도 없이
2024	Snow White's Revenge	스캔들
2024–2025	Cinderella Game	신데렐라 게임
2025	Queen's House	여왕의 집
2025–2026	A Graceful Liar	친밀한 리플리
2026	Pearl in Red	붉은 진주
2026	A Trap Called Desire	욕망의 덫

=== KBS Drama Specials ===
==== KBS2 Saturday anthology (23:15) ====
- Drama City (드라마시티; 1984–2008)
  - What Should I Do? (어떡하지?; 2004)
- Drama Special (드라마 스페셜; 2010)
  - Pianist (피아니스트; 2010)

==== KBS2 Sunday anthology (23:15) ====
- Drama Special (드라마 스페셜; 2011–present)
  - Do You Know Taekwondo? (태권, 도를 아십니까?; 2012)
- Drama Special Series (드라마 스페셜 연작시리즈; 2010–present)
  - Rock, Rock, Rock (락 락 락; 2010)
  - White Christmas (화이트 크리스마스; 2011)
  - Puberty Medley (사춘기 메들리; 2013)

=== KBS Morning dramas ===
- Ilchul Peak (일출; 1989)
- A Blooming Nest (꽃피는 둥지; 1989–1990)
- Wife's garden (아내의 뜰; 1990)
- Autumn guest (가을에 온 손님; 1990–1991)
- White Wind (하늬바람; 1991)
- And a Rocky Boat (그리고 흔들리는 배; 1991–1992)
- A Rainy Afternoon (비 오는 날 오후; 1992–1993)
- A Standing Woman (서있는 여자; 1993)
- A 31-year-old Rebellion (서른한 살의 반란; 1993)
- Love and Farewell (사랑, 그리고 이별; 1993–1994)
- Because You're Here (그대 있음에; 1994)
- The Wind Blowing Outside the Window (창 밖에 부는 바람; 1994)
- Here Comes Ajumma (아줌마가 간다; 2006–2007)
- It's OK Because I Love You (사랑해도 괜찮아; 2007)
- The Innocent Woman (착한여자 백일홍; 2007–2008)
- You Stole My Heart (난 네게 반했어; 2008)
- Wife and Woman (아내와 여자; 2008–2009)
- The Tale of Janghwa and Hongryeon (장화, 홍련; 2009)
- I'll Give You Everything (다 줄거야; 2009–2010)

==== 2010s ====
Year	English title	Korean title
2010	Mom Is Pretty Too	엄마도 예쁘다
2010–2011	I'm Glad I Loved You	사랑하길 잘했어
2011	Pit-a-pat, My Love	두근두근 달콤
2018–2019	Lady Cha Dal-rae's Lover	차달래 부인의 사랑

=== KBS Teen dramas ===
Year	English title	Korean title
1999–2002	School	학교
2003–2007	Sharp	반올림
2017–2018	Andante	안단테

=== KBS TV Novel series ===
==== KBS1 Monday–Saturday (08:00) ====
- TV Novel: Sunok (TV소설 순옥이; 2006–2007)
- TV Novel: Landscape in My Heart (TV소설 그대의 풍경; 2007)
- TV Novel: Beautiful Days (TV소설 아름다운 시절; 2007–2008)
- TV Novel: Big Sister (TV소설 큰 언니; 2008–2009)
- TV Novel: Glory of Youth (TV소설 청춘예찬; 2009)

==== KBS2 Monday–Friday (09:00) ====
- TV Novel: Dear My Sister (TV소설 복희 누나; 2011–2012)
- TV Novel: Love, My Love (TV소설 사랑아 사랑아; 2012–2013)
- TV Novel: Samsaengi (TV소설 삼생이; 2013)
- TV Novel: Eunhui (TV소설 은희; 2013–2014)
- TV Novel: Land of Gold (TV소설 순금의 땅; 2014)
- TV Novel: Single-minded Dandelion (TV소설 일편단심 민들레; 2014–2015)
- TV Novel: In Still Green Days (TV소설 그래도 푸르른 날에; 2015)
- TV Novel: The Stars Are Shining (TV소설 별이 되어 빛나리; 2015–2016)
- TV Novel: My Mind's Flower Rain (TV소설 내 마음의 꽃비; 2016)
- TV Novel: That Sun in the Sky (TV소설 저 하늘에 태양이; 2016–2017)
- TV Novel: A Sea of Her Own (TV소설 그 여자의 바다; 2017)
- TV Novel: Dal Soon's Spring (TV소설 꽃 피어라 달순아!; 2017–2018)
- TV Novel: Through the Waves (TV소설 파도야 파도야; 2018)

== Animated series ==
- Demetan Croaker, The Boy Frog (개구리 왕눈이; 1982–1983, 1986)
- Bumpety Boo (꼬마자동차 붕붕; 1985–1987)
- Pastel Yumi, the Magic Idol (꽃나라 요술봉; 1987)
- Dooly the Little Dinosaur (아기공룡 둘리; 1987–1988, 1990, 1993, 1996, 1998, 2003, 2006)
- Yeongsimi (영심이; 1990)
- Fly Superboard (날아라 슈퍼보드; 1991, 1998, 2001)
- Kori, The Son of Wizard (마법사의 아들 코리; 1993)
- Dragon Quest: Legend of the Hero Abel (아벨 탐험대; 1993, 1997)
- The Rose of Versailles (베르사이유의 장미; 1993, 1997–1998)
- Koby Koby (꼬비꼬비; 1995–1997)
- Whistle! (내일은 축구왕; 1995)
- Duchi and Puku (두치와 뿌꾸; 1996)
- The Green Chariot Hamos (녹색전차 해모수; 1997)
- Sailor Moon (달의 요정 세일러문; 1997–1998, 2000)
- The Brave of Gold Goldran (황금로봇 골드런; 1998–1999)
- Restol, The Special Rescue Squad (레스톨 특수구조대; 1999)
- Black Rubber Shoes (검정 고무신; 1999, 2001, 2004, 2015)
- Milo's Adventure (마일로의 대모험; 1999)
- Flint the Time Detective (4차원 탐정 똘비; 1999)
- Cho Mashin Hero Wataru (슈퍼 씽씽캅; 1999)
- Chūka Ichiban! (요리왕 비룡; 1999)
- Case Closed (명탐정 코난; 2000)
- Taekwon King Kang Tae-Pung (태권왕 강태풍; 2000)
- Digimon Adventure (디지몬 어드벤처; 2000–2001)
- Taeng-gu and Ulasyong (탱구와 울라숑; 2001)
- BASToF Lemon (사이버영혼 바스토프 레몬; 2001–2002)
- Shin Megami Tensei Devichil (데블 파이터; 2001–2002)
- Power Digimon (파워디지몬; 2001–2002)
- The Legend Of Blue (바다의 전설 장보고; 2002)
- Space Hip-hop Duck (스페이스 힙합덕; 2002)
- Princess Comet (별나라 요정 코미; 2002)
- Digimon Tamers (디지몬 테이머즈; 2002–2003)
- Guardian Fairy Michel (수호요정 미셸; 2003)
- Fighting Foodons (요리킹 조리킹; 2003)
- One Piece (원피스; 2003–2007)
- Hey Yo Yorang (요랑아 요랑아; 2003–2004)
- Woobi Boy (내 친구 우비소년; 2003–2004, 2005)
- Cubix (로보짱 큐빅스; 2004)
- Di Gi Charat (디지캐럿; 2005)
- Mix Master (카드왕 믹스마스터; 2005–2006)
- Tori Go! Go! (토리 고! 고!; 2006)
- Kungya Kungya (쿵야쿵야; 2006–2007)
- Crazy Park (다오배찌 붐힐대소동; 2006–2007)
- Tai Chi Chasers (태극천자문; 2007–2008)
- Petit Petit Muse (쁘띠쁘띠 뮤즈; 2008)
- Rolling Stars (롤링스타즈; 2009–2012)
- Cloud Bread (구름빵; 2010–2011, 2011–2012)
- Guardians of the Power Masks (파워마스크; 2011–2012)
- Robotex (로보텍스; 2015–2016)
- Turning Mecard (터닝메카드; 2015–2016)
- Papadog (파파독; 2016)
- Banzi's Secret Diary (반지의 비밀일기; 2017)

== Award shows ==
- KBS Drama Awards
- KBS Song Festival
- KBS Entertainment Awards

== Documentaries ==
- KBS Special (KBS 스페셜)
- The Story of Korean History (한국사 전)
- Science Cafe (과학카페)
- Backpack Travels
- Age of Global Success
- World Heritage Expeditions
- Rediscovery of Korea
- Mysteries of Human Body
- Love in Asia
- Korean Cuisine and Dining
- Animal Kingdom (동물의 왕국)
- Insight on Asia (인사이트 아시아)
  - The Noodle Road (누들로드)
  - Asian Corridor in Heaven (차마고도)
- Documentary 3 Days
- Conversations with the Past (역사스페셜)
- Homo Academicus (공부하는 인간)

== Entertainment ==
Off-Air On-Air

Year	English title	Korean title
1984–2019	Entertainment Weekly	연예가중계
1999–2020	Gag Concert	개그콘서트
2000–2018	VJ's on the Scene	VJ특공대
2001–2020	Happy Together	해피투게더
2003–2012	Sponge	스펀지
2003–2017	Vitamin	비타민
2004–2010	Star Golden Bell	스타 골든벨
2004–2010	Sang Sang Plus	상상더하기
2004–present	Happy Sunday	해피선데이
2005–2020	Fly Shoot Dori	날아라 슛돌이
2007–present	1 Night 2 Days	1박2일
2007–2018	1 vs. 100	1 대 100
2009–2012	Invincible Youth	청춘불패
2009–2013	Qualifications of Men	남자의 자격
2009–2016	Let's Go! Dream Team Season 2	출발 드림팀 시즌2
2010–2013	Triumphantly	탑밴드
2010–2019	Hello Counselor	대국민 토크쇼!! 안녕하세요
2011–2012	Saturday Freedom	자유선언 토요일
2012–2016	The Human Condition	인간의 조건
2013–2016	Cool Kiz On The Block	우리동네 예능과 체육의 능력자
2013–present	The Return of Superman	슈퍼맨이 돌아왔다
2015–present	My Neighbor, Charles	이웃집 찰스
2016–2017	Singing Battle	노래싸움 – 승부
2016–2017	Sister's Slam Dunk	언니들의 슬램덩크
2016–2020 2022–present	Battle Trip	배틀 트립
2016–present	Mr. House Husband	살림하는 남자들
2017	We Like Zines	냄비받침
2017–2018	One Night Sleepover Trip	하룻밤만 재워줘
2018	Where on Earth??	거기가 어딘데??
2018–present	Problem Child in House	옥탑방의 문제아들
2018–2019	Twilight Delight	볼빨간 당신
2018–2019	Grandma's Restaurant in Samcheong-dong	삼청동 외할머니
2019–present	Boss in the Mirror	사장님 귀는 당나귀 귀
2019–present	Godfather	갓파더 - 新가족관계증명서
2019–present	Stars' Top Recipe at Fun-Staurant	신상출시 편스토랑
2019–present	Dogs Are Incredible	개는 훌륭하다

== Music programs ==
- Golden Oldies (가요무대; 1985–present)
- Music Bank (뮤직뱅크; 1998–present) – broadcast from KBS New Wing Open Hall in Yeouido-dong, Yeongdeungpo District, Seoul.
- Love Letter by Yoon Do-hyun (윤도현의 러브레터; 2002–2008)
- You Hee-yeol's Sketchbook (유희열의 스케치북; 2009–2022)
- Immortal Songs 2 (불후의 명곡 2; 2011–present)
- We K-Pop (2019)
- LeeMujin Service (리무진 서비스; 2022–present)

== News and current affairs ==
=== KBS1 ===
- KBS News Plaza (KBS 뉴스광장, KBS 1TV's Breakfast news programme)
- KBS News 930 (KBS 뉴스930, Mid-morning news program)
- KBS News 12 (KBS 뉴스12, Midday news program)
- Each and Every Case (사사건건, talk-show program)
- KBS News 5 (KBS 뉴스5, Early evening news program)
- KBS News 7 (KBS 뉴스7, Evening news programme with some local segments)
- KBS News 9 (KBS 뉴스9, Main news program)
- KBS Newsline W (KBS 뉴스라인 W, Night news program)
- KBS News 2430 (KBS 2430 뉴스, Weekend late night news programme)
- COVID-19 Newsroom (코러나19 통합뉴스룸, special newscast for the COVID-19 pandemic reports)

=== KBS2 ===
- A Morning Worth Trying M&W (해 볼만한 아침 M&W, morning current affairs and economic program)
- KBS Morning Newstime (KBS 아침 뉴스타임, KBS 2TV's morning newscast)
- KBS Global News (지구촌 뉴스, KBS 2TV's world newscast)
- KBS Newstime (KBS 뉴스타임, KBS 2TV's afternoon newscast)
- KBS News 6 (KBS 뉴스6, main flagship newscast)
- KBS World 24 (월드24, primetime world newscast)
- The Live (더 라이브, Night talk-show program)

=== KBS World ===
- News Today (The channel's only English news programme)

== See also ==
- List of programs broadcast by Arirang TV
- List of programs broadcast by MBC TV
- List of programs broadcast by Seoul Broadcasting System
- List of programs broadcast by tvN (South Korean TV channel)
- List of programs broadcast by JTBC
