= Yellow Handkerchief =

The Yellow Handkerchief or Yellow Handkerchief may refer to:

- The Yellow Handkerchief (1977 film), Japanese film
- Yellow Handkerchief, 2003 television program broadcast by Korean Broadcasting System
- The Yellow Handkerchief (2008 film), American film
