= The Three Witches =

2015 South Korean television series

- Promotional poster
- Also known as: The Witch's Castle; Legendary Witch's Castle
- Hangul: 마녀의 성
- RR: Manyeoui seong
- MR: Manyŏŭi sŏng
- Genre: Melodrama; Romance; Family; Fantasy
- Written by: Park Ye-kyung
- Directed by: Jeong Hyo
- Starring: Choi Jung-won; Seo Ji-seok; Yoo Ji-in; Shin Dong-min
- Country of origin: South Korea
- Original language: Korean
- No. of episodes: 122

Production
- Executive producer: Kim Dong-rae
- Running time: 38 minutes every Mondays to Fridays at 19:20 (KST)
- Production companies: RaemongRaein Co., Ltd.

Original release
- Network: SBS
- Release: 14 December 2015 – 10 June 2016

The Three Witches (Korean: 마녀의 성; RR: Manyeoui seong; lit. 'Witch's Castle') is a 2015 South Korean evening daily drama series starring Choi Jung-won, Seo Ji-seok, Yoo Ji-in and Shin Dong-min. It aired on SBS from December 14, 2015 to June 10, 2016, airing every Monday to Friday at 19:20 for 122 episodes.

== Cast and characters ==
=== Main cast ===
- Choi Jung-won as Oh Dan-byul
- Seo Ji-seok as Shin Kang-hyun
- Lee Hae-in as Moon Hee-jae
- Yu Ji-in as Yang Ho-duk
- Shin Dong-mi as Gong Se-shil
- Danny Ahn as Baek Eun-yong

=== People around Oh Dan-byul ===
- Jung Han-yong as Gong Nam-soo
- Kim Sun-kyung as Seo Mil-rae
- Lee Seul-bi as Seo Hyang
- Lincoln Paul Lambert as Leo

=== People around Shin Kang-hyun ===
- Choi Il-hwa as Moon Sang-gook
- Na Moon-hee as Chun Geum-ok
- Jung Wook as Wang Yoo-sung

=== Baek Eun-yong's family ===
- Kim Seung-hwan as Bae Geum-yong
- Kim Min-hee as Hong Chun-seol (Hong Chun-ae)

=== Extended cast ===
- Son Hwa-ryung as Ok Goo-seul
- Jung Byung-chul as Moon Sang-gook's secretary
- Han Eun-sun as Na Soon-shim
- Choi Won-myeong as Kang Hoon-nam
- Lee Ha-yool as Jin Tae-won
- Kim Woo-suk as Moon Sang-gook (young)
- Jin Hyun-kwang as Detective Kim Ji-hoon

=== Guests / Cameos ===
- Kim Jeong-hoon as Gong Joon-young
- Kang Ji-sub

== Trivia ==
- This drama is Choi Jung-won's second collaboration and the director Jeong Hyo after Stars Falling from the Sky.
