= Yoo Seung-ho =

South Korean actor (born 1993)

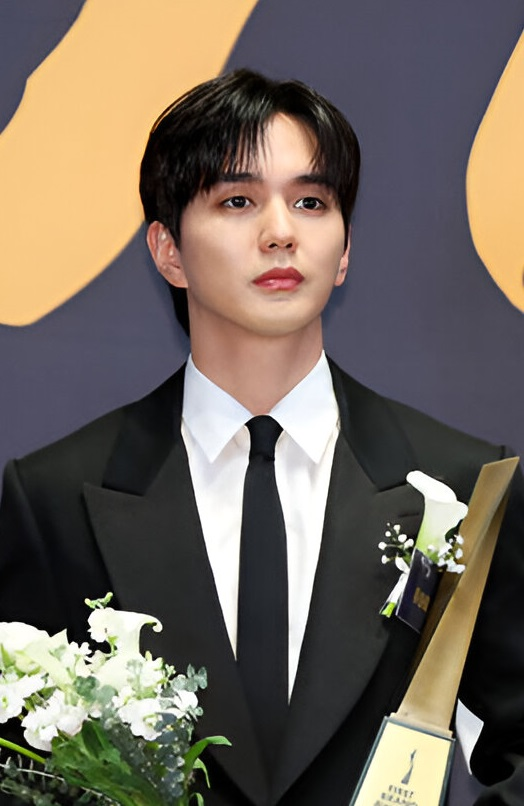
- Yoo in January 2024
- Born: August 17, 1993 (age 33); Incheon, South Korea
- Occupation: Actor
- Years active: 1999–present
- Agent: 333

Korean name
- Hangul: 유승호
- RR: Yu Seungho
- MR: Yu Sŭngho

Yoo Seung-ho (/juː sʊŋhɔː/; Korean: 유승호; born August 17, 1993) is a South Korean actor. Known for his roles in film and television, he has received two nominations at the Baeksang Arts Awards and was nicknamed "Nation's Little Brother" in his home country. Yoo rose to fame as a child actor in the film The Way Home (2002), and has since starred in the television series The Emperor: Owner of the Mask (2017), I'm Not a Robot (2017), and Moonshine (2021–2022).

== Early life ==
Yoo was born on August 17, 1993, and was raised in Jakjeon-dong, Gyeyang District, Incheon, South Korea, He is the younger of two siblings, he later claimed that his family had been poor. Yoo graduated from Baekshin High School in February 2012. He decided not to pursue a college degree in order to concentrate on his acting career.

== Career ==
=== 1999–2009: Beginnings as a child actor ===
Yoo made his entertainment debut in a cellphone commercial in 1999 after Yoo's mother sent in a photo of her son to an ad agency. In 2000 Yoo began his career as a child actor, first appearing in the television drama Daddy Fish. He rose to stardom in his first film The Way Home, playing a bratty city boy who learns to appreciate country life when he's forced to spend the summer with his deaf-mute grandmother. The low-budget film was a surprise box office hit in 2002, drawing more than 4 million admissions. He was then affectionately labeled as "Nation's Little Brother". Thereafter, Yoo also starred in animal movie Hearty Paws (2006) about a boy and his beloved dog, and Unforgettable (2008) about school children from a remote island who go on a field trip to a candy factory in Seoul during the 1970s.

He continued acting in television, appearing in Magic Warriors Mir & Gaon (2005), an adventure series for children. Yoo further built his filmography, playing younger counterparts of male protagonists in television dramas, including general Yi Sun-sin in Immortal Admiral Yi Sun-sin (2004), King Seongjong in The King and I (2007), and Gwanggaeto the Great in The Legend (2007). In 2009, Yoo starred in the action film City of Fathers and thriller film 4th Period Mystery. He also played Kim Chunchu in the period epic Queen Seondeok.

=== 2010–2014: Teen roles ===
In his teens, Yoo was cast in one of the major roles in Master of Study (2010), a Korean screen adaptation of Japanese manga Dragon Zakura. He then played a more mature role in Flames of Desire, as the second-generation son of a wealthy chaebol family who is uninterested in the battles of succession among his relatives and becomes a married man at 21. Later that year, Yoo sang a duet with singer/actress IU titled "I Believe in Love" for the charity program Love Request. The song's lyrics was based on a diary that Yoo had written while seeing orphans of war in the slums of Sri Lanka.

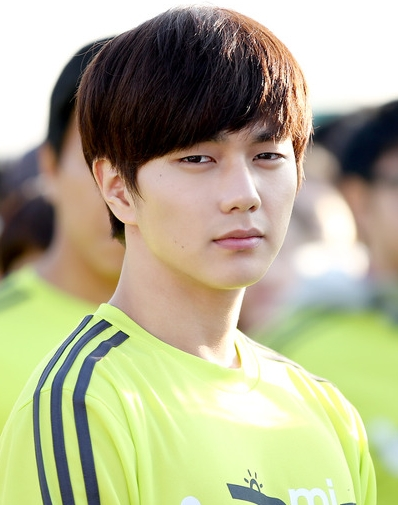
Yoo in November 2012

In 2011, Yoo trained in swordplay and martial arts in his role as an assassin in Warrior Baek Dong-soo, an action-period drama based on the manhwa by Lee Jae-heon. He also voiced Greenie, Leafie's adopted son, on Leafie, a Hen into the Wild, which was adapted from a bestselling children's novel by Hwang Sun-mi. He then co-starred with Kim Ha-neul in the thriller Blind.

In 2012, Yoo was cast in his first role as a leading man in Operation Proposal, a Korean remake of the Japanese drama Proposal Daisakusen. This was followed by a supporting role as the Jade Emperor, ruler of the heavens, in the fantasy-period drama Arang and the Magistrate. Afterwards, he starred in the melodrama Missing You, playing a cold man who hides a vengeance-filled heart behind his seemingly gentle smile.

Known in the press as "Little So Ji-sub" for his resemblance to the said actor, in 2013 Yoo starred in the music video for So's single "Eraser" together with Park Shin-hye. This was his second time promoting So's musical endeavors, after "Lonely Life" in 2008. Following that, Yoo's first photo book titled Travel Letter, Spring Snow, And... was published; it was the last project shot by celebrity photographer Bori before her death on April 9, 2013.

=== 2015–present: Adult roles and rising popularity ===
As his first post-army project, Yoo appeared in the music video for Naul's "You From the Same Time" in 2015. He was next cast as a stubborn webcomic writer raising a cat in the TV adaptation of webtoon Imaginary Cat. Yoo followed this by starring in the joseon-era romance film The Magician directed by Kim Dae-seung, in which he plays a circus magician who falls in love with a princess. Yoo was then cast in SBS's legal thriller series Remember as a lawyer with hyperthymesia who defends his father on death row.

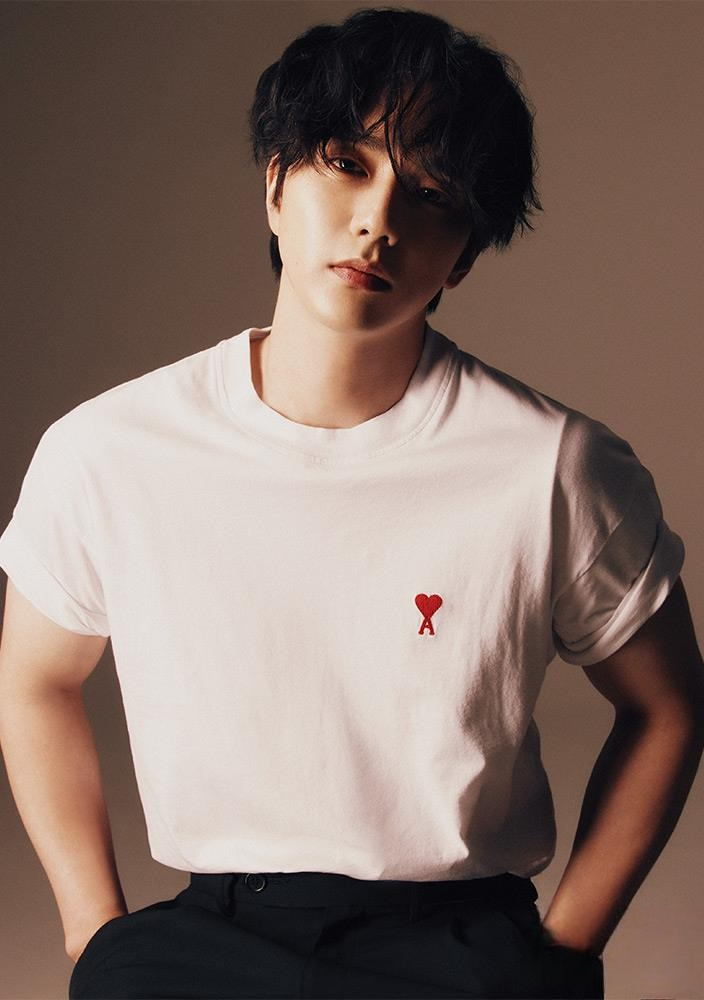
Yoo in May 2021

In 2016, Yoo starred in the historical comedy film Seondal: The Man Who Sells the River as the titular character Kim Seon-dal. In 2017, he starred in MBC's historical melodrama The Emperor: Owner of the Mask and romantic-comedy I'm Not a Robot. In 2018, he was cast in SBS's high school drama My Strange Hero. In 2020, Yoo starred in the mystery thriller Memorist as a detective in the police force with the power to read people's memories. In 2021, Yoo played a passionate inspector in KBS2 historical drama Moonshine. In 2022, he made a special appearance in the action crime film Special Delivery. In March 2022, Yoo signed with new agency YG Entertainment.

In 2023, Yoo returned to the small screen with his first streaming project, Wavve's crime thriller The Deal portraying a completely different character than his previous ones - a financially struggling young man who accidentally kidnaps his school friend for a 10 billion won ransom. The mini-series was the only Korean drama invited to the third edition of the Red Sea International Film Festival in Jeddah, Saudi Arabia. Yoo walked the red carpet at VOX Cinemas in the Red Sea Mall together with the director Lee Jung-gon and took part in the screening of the first three episodes of the drama. In 2024, he appeared in the music video for Day6's "Welcome to the Show." In March 2025, Yoo signed with 333, a new management company established by Son Ho-jun. In

== Personal life ==
=== Military service ===
Yoo enlisted for his mandatory military service as an active duty soldier on March 5, 2013, where he became an instructor training new recruits. He was discharged on December 4, 2014.

=== Philanthropy ===
Yoo donated ₩10 million to Ronald McDonald House Korea, which provides shelters near hospitals. He has been named ambassador for the 2025 McDonald's Happy Walk, furthering his commitment to helping the foundation and its beneficiaries.

== Filmography ==
=== Film ===
Year	Title	Role	Notes	Ref.
2002	The Way Home	Sang-woo		
2003	Happy Ero Christmas	Children's angel choir		
2004	Don't Tell Papa	Kim Cho-won		
2006	Hearty Paws	Chan-yi		
2008	Unforgettable	Gil-su		
2009	Astro Boy	Astro Boy	(voice, Korean dubbed)	
2009	City of Fathers	Kim Jong-chul		
2009	4th Period Mystery	Han Jung-hoon		
2011	Leafie, A Hen into the Wild	Greenie	(voice)	
2011	Blind	Kwon Gi-seob		
2012	Fragments of Sweet Memories		(3D short film)	
2015	Joseon Magician	Hwan-hee		
2016	Seondal: The Man Who Sells the River	Kim In-hong / Kim Seon-dal		
2022	Special Delivery		Special appearance	

=== Television series ===
Year	Title	Role	Notes	Ref.
2000	Daddy Fish	Jung Da-um		
2001	Boys Don't Cry	Doo-san	Drama City	
2001	It Happened in the Parking Lot		Drama City	
2003	All That Ramen	Joon-young	Drama City	
2003	Winter Bird's Dream	Joon-ho	Drama City	
2003	Love Letter	young Lee Woo-jin		
2004	Hi, Clementine	Se-beom	Drama City	
2004	Sweet Buns	young Lee Shin-hyuk		
2004	Immortal Admiral Yi Sun-sin	young Yi Sun-sin		
2004	Precious Family	Park Joon-yi		
2005	Sad Love Story	young Seo Joon-young		
2005	Magic Warriors Mir & Gaon	Mir		
2006	Alien Sam	Wang Hae-ryong		
2007	The King and I	young Seongjong		
2007	The Legend	young Damdeok		
2009	Queen Seondeok	Kim Chunchu		
2009	You're Beautiful	Customer at convenience store	Cameo (Episode 9)	
2010	Master of Study	Hwang Baek-hyun		
2010	Flames of Desire	Kim Min-jae		
2011	Warrior Baek Dong-soo	Yeo Woon		
2012	Operation Proposal	Kang Baek-ho		
2012	Arang and the Magistrate	Jade Emperor, King of Heaven		
2012	Missing You	Kang Hyung-joon / Harry Borrison		
2015	Imaginary Cat	Hyun Jong-hyun		
2015–2016	Remember	Seo Jin-woo		
2017	The Emperor: Owner of the Mask	Lee Sun		
2017–2018	I'm Not a Robot	Kim Min-kyu		
2018	Player	Lee Han-sang	Cameo (Episode 1)	
2018–2019	My Strange Hero	Kang Bok Soo		
2020	Memorist	Dong Baek		
2021–2022	Moonshine	Nam Young		
2023	The Deal	Lee Jun-seong		
2026	Flex X Cop	Yoo Seong-won	Season 2, Special appearance	

=== Television shows ===
Year	Title	Role	Notes	Ref.
2013	Homo Academicus	Narrator	Documentary narrator	
2022–2023	Off the Grid	Main Cast	Episodes 19–20	
2023	Docu Insight: Code Blue	Narrator	Medical Documentary	
2026	The Last Humanity	Cast member		

=== Music video appearances ===
Year	Song title	Artist	Ref.
2001	"Second Wish"	Duke	
2002	"Have You Ever Been Lovesick"	Lyn	
2002	"Photo"	Dragonfly	
2002	"Sorry"	Kim Jang-hoon	
2004	"Thanks"	Tim	
2008	"Don't Go, Don't Go"	Brown Eyes	
2008	"A Lonely Life" (고독한 인생)	So Ji-sub	
2009	"Take Care of Her" (그녀를 잘 부탁합니다)	Jo Sung-mo	
2009	"Lie" (거짓말)	T-ara	
2010	"Like a Star" (별처럼) (with The One)	Taeyeon	
2011	"Whenever You Play That Song" (그 노래를 틀 때마다) (with LE of EXID)	Huh Gak	
2013	"Eraser" (지우개) (featuring Mellow)	So Ji-sub	
2015	"You From the Same Time" (같은 시간 속의 너)	Naul	
2016	"I Don't Love You" (널 사랑하지 않아)	Urban Zakapa	
2018	"Sullae" (술래)	Rothy	
2024	"Welcome to the Show"	Day6	

== Theater ==
Theater play performance
Year	Title		Role	Theater	Date	Ref.
Year	English	Korean	Role	Theater	Date	Ref.
2024	Angels in America	엔젤스인 아메리카	Prior Walter	LG Signature Hall at LG Arts Center, Seoul	August 6 to September 28	
2025	Killing Ceaser	킬링시저	Brutus	Mary Hall Grand Theater of Sogang University, Seoul	May 10 to July 20	

== Discography ==
=== Singles ===
Title	Year	Peak positions	Sales	Album
Title	Year	KOR	Sales	Album
"I Believe in Love" (사랑을 믿어요) (Yoo Seung-ho featuring IU)	2010	11	KOR: 1,010,437	Road for Hope

== Bibliography ==
Year	Title	Publisher	ISBN	Notes
2013	Travel Letter, Spring Snow, And...	Wisdom House	ISBN 9788959137268	Photobook

== Awards and nominations ==
Name of the award ceremony, year presented, category, nominee of the award, and the result of the nomination
Award ceremony	Year	Category	Nominee / Work	Result	Ref.
Andre Kim Best Star Awards	2009	Male Star Award	Yoo Seung-ho	Won	
Baeksang Arts Awards	2010	Best New Actor – Film	4th Period Mystery	Nominated	
Baeksang Arts Awards	2010	Best New Actor – Television	Master of Study	Nominated	
Grand Bell Awards	2002	Best New Actor	The Way Home	Nominated	
KBS Drama Awards	2005	Best Young Actor	Immortal Admiral Yi Sun-sin, Precious Family	Won	
KBS Drama Awards	2010	Excellence Award, Actor in a Miniseries	Master of Study	Nominated	
KBS Drama Awards	2010	Best Couple Awards	Yoo Seung-ho with Park Ji-yeon; Master of Study	Nominated	
Korea Best Dressed Swan Awards	2010	Best Dressed, TV Actor category	Master of Study	Won	
Korea First Brand Awards	2024	Best OTT Actor	The Deal	Won	
Korea Movie Star Awards	2007	Best Young Actor	Heart Is...	Won	
Korea Drama Awards	2016	Top Excellence Award, Actor	Remember	Nominated	
MBC Drama Awards	2009	Best New Actor	Queen Seondeok	Won	
MBC Drama Awards	2012	Excellence Award, Actor in a Miniseries	Arang and the Magistrate, Missing You	Nominated	
MBC Drama Awards	2017	Grand Prize (Daesang)	The Emperor: Owner of the Mask	Nominated	
MBC Drama Awards	2017	Top Excellence Award, Actor in a Miniseries	The Emperor: Owner of the Mask	Won	
Mnet 20's Choice Awards	2008	Hot Younger Male	Yoo Seung-ho	Won	
SBS Drama Awards	2007	Best Young Actor	The King and I	Won	
SBS Drama Awards	2016	Excellence Award, Actor in a Genre Drama	Remember	Won	
SBS Drama Awards	2019	Top Excellence Award, Actor in a Miniseries	My Strange Hero	Nominated	
Soompi Awards	2018	Best Couple Award	Yoo Seung-ho with Kim So-hyun; The Emperor: Owner of the Mask	Nominated	
Young Artist Awards	2003	Best Young Performer in International Film	The Way Home	Won	
