= Imaginary Cat =

2015 South Korean television series

- Promotional poster
- Hangul: 상상고양이
- RR: Sangsang goyangi
- MR: Sangsang koyangi
- Genre: Romance; Comedy; Fantasy
- Based on: Sangsang go-yang-i by Kim Gyung
- Written by: Kim Sun-young; Seo Yoon-hee
- Directed by: Lee Hyun-joo
- Starring: Yoo Seung-ho; Han Ye-ri; Cho Hye-jung
- Country of origin: South Korea
- Original language: Korean
- No. of episodes: 8

Production
- Production location: South Korea
- Running time: 35 minutes

Original release
- Network: MBC Every 1
- Release: November 24, 2015 – January 12, 2016

Imaginary Cat (Korean: 상상고양이) is an 8-episode South Korean television series starring Yoo Seung-ho. It aired on cable network MBC Every 1, every Tuesday at 20:50 (KST) from November 24, 2015, to January 12, 2016.

== Synopsis ==
The series tells the story of Hyun Jong-hyun, a stubborn part-time worker who dreams of being a webtoon writer, and his confidant, a stray cat named Bokgil.

== Cast ==
=== Main ===
- Yoo Seung-ho as Hyun Jong-hyun
- Han Ye-ri as Bokgil (voice only)

=== Supporting ===
- Cho Hye-jung as Oh Na-woo
- Park Chul-min as Team Leader Ma Joo-im
- Lee El as Dokgo Soon
- Kim Min-seok as Yook Hae-gong
- Solar as Jung Soo-in
- Kim Hyun-joon as Park Jin-sung
- Choi Tae-hwan as Lee Wan
- Shim Min as Heo Gong-joo
- Jun Hun-tae
