= Medical Top Team =

2013 South Korean television series

- Promotional poster for Medical Top Team
- Genre: Medical drama; Romance
- Written by: Yoon Kyung-ah
- Directed by: Kim Do-hoon; Oh Hyun-jong
- Starring: Kwon Sang-woo; Jung Ryeo-won; Ju Ji-hoon; Oh Yeon-seo; Choi Min-ho
- Country of origin: South Korea
- Original language: Korean
- No. of episodes: 20

Production
- Running time: 60 minutes
- Production company: AStory

Original release
- Network: Munhwa Broadcasting Corporation
- Release: October 9 – December 12, 2013

Medical Top Team (Korean: 메디컬탑팀) is a South Korean television series written by Yoon Kyung-ah and directed by Kim Do-hoon. It starred Kwon Sang-woo, Jung Ryeo-won, Ju Ji-hoon, Oh Yeon-seo and Choi Min-ho. The series began filming in August 2013, and aired on MBC from October 9 to December 12, 2013, on Wednesdays and Thursdays at 21:55 for 20 episodes. The medical drama focuses on the lives of doctors and nurses who are members of an elite medical team from the fictional Gwang Hae University Hospital.

== Characters ==
=== Main cast ===
- Kwon Sang-woo as Park Tae-shin

A 35-years old genius thoracic surgeon who is misunderstood due to his straightforward manner of speaking, but is kind and soft-hearted. Sometimes he acts impulsively, once he even pushed Seo out of his way, when helping ill waitress. Previously he worked in the USA. Dr. Park grew up in an orphanage, where he was abused, along with other children, by director. Later Park was adopted. After many years he tried to find his biological parents, but eventually gave up. Later he developed romantic interest in Ah-jin.

- Jung Ryeo-won as Seo Joo-young

A charismatic and ambitious thoracic surgeon. Lee Min-jung and Lee Na-young were previously in talks for the role. Sometimes professor Seo feels discriminated due to being female surgeon, so she always tries her best. She also got her medical research supported by Research Centre. Joo-young is in relationship with Seung-jae. At the beginning of the series Seo had some eating disorders, but eventually overcome these.

- Ju Ji-hoon as Han Seung-jae

A renowned 36-years old internist and the youngest chief, whose mild-mannered appearance hides his heart-of-ice interior (though it is later revealed that he actually is quite sensitive person). He is the leader of top team and son of chairman of the Gwang Hae University Hospital, Lee Doo-kyung. As illegitimate child (in Korea children usually inherit the father's family name), he was raised by single mother, who eventually died due to severe pancreatitis, leaving Seung-jae devastated. Chief Han has had feelings for professor Seo ever since medical school. The two eventually started seeing each other. By the end of the series he is appointed as chairman of Kwanghye University's second hospital.

- Oh Yeon-seo as Choi Ah-jin

An enthusiastic and energetic resident surgeon who has been in the field for only two years. She is close friends with Kim Seong-woo, but fell in love with Tae-shin. Ah-jin used to be a big eater, which eventually lead her to have kidney stones. Later she was diagnosed with Multiple endocrine neoplasia type 1 (MEN1) and was involved in clinical trials.

- Choi Min-ho as Kim Seong-woo

A good-natured resident surgeon, and the youngest member of the team. He has a one-sided crush on Choi Ah-jin. When she was hospitalised he even pretended to be her boyfriend, in order to be allowed to visit her. Seong-woo had very hard moments, when he had to pronounce death of his school junior (who used to have a crush on him).

=== Supporting cast ===
- Kim Young-ae as Shin Hye-soo - The deputy director of the Gwang Hae University Hospital. She has been manipulating younger doctors, especially dr. Park, prof. Seo and chief Han, in order to have Royal Medical Centre opened. She is chairman's daughter in law (although divorced with his son). It's later revealed that she has vascular dementia. Shin also had a son, who she gave up. Then the son died, before the two could reunite.
- Ahn Nae-sang as Jang Yong-seop - Chief of surgery. He wants to control professor Seo, but is not always obeyed.
- Park Won-sang as Jo Joon-hyuk - A kind 43-years old anesthesiologist at the hospital idolized by Ah-jin.
- Lee Hee-jin as Yoo Hye-ran - The sociable surgical nurse of the team who is supportive of Park Tae-shin.
- Alex Chu as Bae Sang-kyu - A kind-hearted 34-years old medical imaging specialist of the team who hides great ambition.
- Kim Ki-bang as Jung Hoon-min - A 34-years old neurosurgeon of the team who is in a relationship with Yeo Min-ji.
- Jo Woo-ri as Yeo Min-ji - Another surgical nurse of the team who is the love interest of both Bae Sang-kyu and Jung Hoon-min.
- Kim Sung-kyum as Lee Doo-kyung - Chairman of the Gwang Hae University Hospital and the father of Han Seung-jae, who he treats as a mistake, despite young doctor's many achievements. Apart from chief Han, he has at least two legitimate sons, however neighter of them appeared on screen. As chairman Lee falls ill, most of his responsibilities are taken over by deputy director Shin.
- Lee Dae-yeon as Hwang Cheol-goo - The director of the Paran Clinic.
- Jo Woo-jin as Doctor Lim.
- Kim Cheong as Han Eun-sook - Mother of Han Seung-jae. She was abandoned by chairman Lee (probably when still pregnant), thus raised Seung-jae under her family name. She has always been very proud of her son and wanted to protect him from suffering. Eun-sook suffered from alcoholism and eventually died of acute pancreatitis in her son's arms. Her last wish was Joo-young and Seung-jae be together, and they did.
- Kal So-won as Eun Ba-wi - Patient of the hospital. She is very close with dr. Park. Ba-wi went through bone marrow, and then lung transplant. She lived in orphanage until her biological mother was found.
- Lee Do-kyung as orphanage director.

== Ratings ==
Episode #	Original broadcast date	Average audience share			
Episode #	Original broadcast date	TNmS Ratings		AGB Nielsen	
Episode #	Original broadcast date	Nationwide	Seoul National Capital Area	Nationwide	Seoul National Capital Area
1	October 9, 2013	6.5%	6.8%	7.3%	8.5%
2	October 10, 2013	6.5%	7.4%	7.0%	7.1%
3	October 16, 2013	6.5%	7.1%	7.2%	8.3%
4	October 17, 2013	6.3%	7.2%	6.1%	6.6%
5	October 23, 2013	5.6%	6.1%	5.5%	5.8%
6	October 24, 2013	5.9%	6.3%	5.8%	6.1%
7	October 30, 2013	4.7%	5.1%	4.9%	5.1%
8	October 31, 2013	5.9%	6.0%	6.4%	6.8%
9	November 6, 2013	5.2%	6.4%	4.4%	5.0%
10	November 7, 2013	4.7%	5.0%	3.8%	4.6%
11	November 13, 2013	4.3%	5.3%	3.9%	4.6%
12	November 14, 2013	3.9%	4.5%	3.6%	4.3%
13	November 20, 2013	6.0%	7.0%	5.7%	6.0%
14	November 21, 2013	5.7%	6.5%	6.0%	6.9%
15	November 27, 2013	5.7%	5.9%	5.5%	6.5%
16	November 28, 2013	5.5%	5.8%	5.1%	5.8%
17	December 4, 2013	6.0%	7.0%	5.4%	5.8%
18	December 5, 2013	5.3%	5.7%	5.8%	6.7%
19	December 11, 2013	5.0%	6.0%	5.3%	6.0%
20	December 12, 2013	5.5%	6.0%	5.6%	6.2%
Average		5.5%	6.1%	5.5%	6.1%

== Awards and nominations ==
Year	Award	Category	Recipient	Result
2013	32nd MBC Drama Awards	Top Excellence Award, Actor in a Miniseries	Kwon Sang-woo	Nominated
2013	32nd MBC Drama Awards	Top Excellence Award, Actress in a Miniseries	Jung Ryeo-won	Nominated
2013	32nd MBC Drama Awards	Excellence Award, Actor in a Miniseries	Ju Ji-hoon	Nominated
2013	32nd MBC Drama Awards	Best New Actor	Choi Min-ho	Nominated

== Original soundtrack ==
Disc 1:
No.	Title	Artist	Length
1.	"시간에 기대어" (I'll Be There)	Lim Jeong-hee
2.	"Can You Feel Me?"	Melody Day
3.	"불빛" (Light)	John Park	3:50
4.	"I Hear You"	Mooy & Miro
5.	"그 자리에" (That Place)	Jang Yi-jung of History
6.	"탑팀의 활약"	Kim Joon-seok
7.	"메디컬 탑팀" (Medical Top Team)	Kim Joon-seok
8.	"성공의 환희"	Jung Se-rin
9.	"사랑과 우정"	Jung Se-rin
10.	"코드블루" (Code Blue)	Jung Hee-jung
11.	"Emergency"	Kim Joon-seok
12.	"야망"	Lee Hyo-jung
13.	"눈앞의 벽"	Lee Hyo-jung
14.	"파란병원"	Jung Se-rin

Disc 2:
No.	Title	Artist	Length
1.	"탑팀의 하루"	Jung Se-rin
2.	"의사 박태신"	Jung Se-rin
3.	"탑팀 결성"	Kim Joon-seok
4.	"갈등과 고민"	Kim Joon-seok
5.	"삶의 기쁨"	Jung Se-rin
6.	"독하고 쓸쓸하게 나의 길을 가련다"	Jung Se-rin
7.	"Blue Love"	Jung Se-rin
8.	"수술현장"	Lee Hyo-jung
9.	"Chaos"	Lee Hyo-jung
10.	"Janus"	Jung Hee-jung
11.	"Disturb"	Jeon Se-jin
12.	"Portentous Question"	Kwon Won-jin
13.	"Déjà vu"	Kwon Won-jin
14.	"Doctor's Blues"	Jeon Se-jin
15.	"Something There"	Lee Yoon-ji
16.	"고된 과정"	Kim Joon-seok

== International broadcast ==
- It aired in Japan on cable channel KNTV starting May 17, 2014; Kwon Sang-woo embarked on a series of fan meetings in order to promote the drama.
- It aired in the Philippines on GMA Network from June 1 to July 1, 2016, under the title I Heart You Doc.
- It is also available to stream on Iflix with a variety of subtitles in Malaysia, the Philippines, Thailand, Indonesia and Sri Lanka.
- It aired in Vietnam on VTV3 from April 24, 2015, under the title Đội ngũ danh y.
- It aired in Indonesia on RTV from April 23 – July 24, 2015, every Thursday & Friday, 7:30pm – 8:30pm. The series repeated again from April 23 – July 24, 2016, every Saturday & Sunday, 6:30pm – 7:30pm.
- It aired again in Malaysia on TV2 from February 5 – April 15, 2018, every Sunday to Tuesday, 8:35pm – 9:30pm. The series repeated again from October 25 – December 3, 2018, every Monday to Friday, 1:00pm – 2:00pm.
- It aired in India on Playflix from 12 January 2024 with Hindi Dubbed Language.
