= Heart Is... =

Heart is...
- Film poster
- Directed by: Park Eun-hyung; Oh Dal-kyun
- Screenplay by: Shin Dong-ik
- Produced by: Kim Min-gi; Kim Woo-gwang
- Starring: Yoo Seung-ho; Kim Hyang-gi
- Cinematography: Kim Seon-ryeong
- Edited by: Kim Chang-ju
- Music by: Won Ho-gyeong
- Production companies: Bring Rich; FineWorks; SBS Productions
- Distributed by: Showbox/Mediaplex
- Release date: October 25, 2006
- Running time: 97 minutes
- Country: South Korea
- Language: Korean
- Box office: US$4,678,547

Heart is... (Korean: 마음이; RR: Maeumi), also known as Hearty Paws, is a 2006 South Korean drama film directed by Park Eun-hyung and Oh Dal-kyun.

== Plot ==
Two siblings, an 11-year-old boy named Chan-yi (Yoo Seung-ho) and his little sister So-yi (Kim Hyang-gi), have been abandoned by their mother, and are left to survive on their own. For his sister's 6th birthday, Chan-yi decides to give her a dog. He sneaks into a house of an old couple and steals a newly born puppy, which she's been longing to have. Even though they are poor, they were happy. But everything changed after a tragic accident; So-yi died. Chan-yi blames this on his dog and finds his way to his mother, not realizing that the dog was the only true family that would never leave him.

== Cast ==
- Yoo Seung-ho as Chan-yi
- Kim Hyang-gi as So-yi
- Dolly as hearty
- Ahn Gil-kang
- Jung Min-ah
- Won Jang-hee
- Kim Nan-hwi
- Seo Young-hwa
- Jo Deok-jae
- Kim Gyeong-rae
- Kim Dong-young as restaurant worker
- Baek Seung-do
- Yoo Jin-ah

== Release ==
The film was released in South Korea on October 25, 2006, and sold 1,042,166 tickets nationwide.
