= Searching for the Elephant =

- Directed by: S.K. Jhung
- Written by: S.K. Jhung
- Produced by: S.K. Jhung
- Starring: Jang Hyuk; Lee Sang-woo; Jo Dong-hyuk
- Cinematography: Oh Seung-hwan
- Edited by: Kim Sun-min
- Music by: Park Min-june (DJ Soulscape)
- Distributed by: Vantage Holdings
- Release date: November 5, 2009
- Running time: 142 minutes
- Country: South Korea
- Language: Korean
- Box office: US$915,943

Searching for the Elephant (Korean: 펜트하우스 코끼리; RR: Penteuhauseu kokkiri; lit. 'Penthouse Elephant') is a 2009 South Korean psychological thriller written, directed and produced by S.K. Jhung (a.k.a. Jhung Seung-koo). It stars Jang Hyuk, Jo Dong-hyuk and Lee Sang-woo as three male friends who deal with sex addiction, anxiety and other contemporary disorders.

== Plot ==
Freelance photographer Hyun-woo has a successful career and seems to be living an enviable life. But he's been suffering from depression since his ex-girlfriend Ma-ri left him, and begins to have trouble distinguishing between reality and delusion. One of Hyun-woo's friends, Min-seok, is an in-demand plastic surgeon who is also married to Hyun-woo's sister Soo-yeon. But Min-seok is constantly having affairs with various women and suspects that he may have sex addiction. Another longtime friend, Jin-hyuk, is a finance specialist. Jin-hyuk is secretly having an affair with Soo-yeon, Min-seok's wife, and is willing to give up everything for their love.

A suicidal, pot-smoking photographer with schizophrenic episodes, a sex addicted plastic surgeon with a bad conscience, and a secretive financier with legal trouble. These three childhood friends come together to relate common memories, future ambitions and share their deepest secrets. Searching for the Elephant is a raw, innovative film that portrays the decadent lives of the successful metropolitan in a cynical world. Materialistic dreams and mental anguishes collide as the lives of the three confused friends, and the women surrounding them, spirals out of control. The film is a stylistic psychological study, with its gritty story portrayed with creative images, disjointed cuts and a slick, stylistic camera work and aesthetics. Creating a beautiful contrast to the dark, disturbing story unfolding.

== Cast ==
- Jang Hyuk ... Hyun-woo
- Jo Dong-hyuk ... Min-seok
- Lee Sang-woo ... Jin-hyuk
- Lee Min-jung ... Soo-yeon
- Hwang Woo-seul-hye ... Ma-ri
- Park Soo-jin ... Ji-na
- Byun Hee-bong ... zoo official
- Jeon Se-hong ... Mi-young
- Baek Jeong-min ... Dong-won
- Jang Ja-yeon ... Hye-mi
- Jung In-gi ... detective
- Lee Eun-soo ... young Hyun-woo
- Yoon Seol-hee ... girl in school uniform
- Ra Mi-ran ... middle-aged teacher
- Woo Sang-jeon ... old man
- Park Jin-woo ... chief administrator

== Reception ==
Reviews for the film have been mixed. The Swiss website molodezhnaja.ch gave the film 3 stars (out of 5), citing the acting as "dramatic but exaggerated" but calling the film "boring." The online cinematheque MUBI gave it 4 stars (out of 5). Beyond Hollywood gave a generally negative review, stating that it is "void of any driving drama or tension right through until the final act" and that "the film is packed with wacky, often meaningless moments."

This film is S.K. Jhung's feature directorial debut, and it was screened at various international film festivals including the Stockholm International Film Festival, the Warsaw International Film Festival, the Leeds International Film Festival, and the São Paulo International Film Festival.

Searching for the Elephant landed on Korean critics' lists as one of the most underrated movies of 2009.

The writer director S. K. Jhung of Searching for the Elephant was nominated for Grand Prix at the Warsaw International Film Festival in 2009.
