= Do You See Seoul? =

- Official poster
- Hangul: 서울이 보이냐?
- RR: Seouri boinya?
- MR: Sŏuri poinya?
- Directed by: Song Dong-yoon
- Written by: Song Dong-yoon
- Produced by: Heo Jae-cheol
- Starring: Yoo Seung-ho; Lee Chang-hoon; Oh Soo-ah; Kim You-jung
- Cinematography: Hur Eung-hoi
- Edited by: Kyung Min-ho
- Music by: Kim Chang-su
- Production company: Line Pictures
- Distributed by: Cinema Service
- Release date: May 8, 2008
- Running time: 85 minutes
- Country: South Korea
- Language: Korean
- Box office: US$299,631

Do You See Seoul? (Korean: 서울이 보이냐?; RR: Seouri boinya?), also known as Unforgettable, is a 2008 South Korean drama film, written and directed by Song Dong-yoon. It stars Yoo Seung-ho, Lee Chang-hoon, Oh Soo-ah and Kim You-jung.

The film was released on May 8, 2008, and drew a total of 50,956 admissions.

== Plot ==
The story unfolds as a journey through time, intertwining the life of Gil-su, now a teacher in Seoul, with the vivid memories of his childhood on the island of Sindo.

In the present day, as the summer vacation approaches, Gil-su dreams of taking his students on a trip to Sindo. However, facing opposition from skeptical parents, he embarks on the journey alone, reminiscing about his childhood and his cherished teacher.

The narrative transports us back to 1976, where the boy Gil-su shoulders the responsibility of caring for his little sister while his dad struggles with alcoholism and his mom has left the family seeking a better life in Seoul. In the small school of Sindo, the caring Eun-yong is the only teacher.

A burst of excitement happens for the island's children when a Seoul cookie factory invites them for a visit. But their parents, worried about money and the city's impact on the children, resist. Despite parental disapproval the kids, captivated by the chance of seeing a real bicycle in the big city, and encouraged by their teacher, join forces to earn the necessary funds on their own. For Gil-su the trip holds an even more special meaning as he hopes to find his mom in Seoul.

After numerous challenges the parents finally agree and the kids are on their way to Seoul travelling with a train for the first time. However, the journey takes an unexpected turn when Gil-su, his sister, and their friend Yoon-bok get lost in the big city, creating serious challenges for their dedicated teacher.

== Cast ==
- Yoo Seung-ho as Gil-su
- Lee Chang-hoon as adult Gil-su
- Oh Soo-ah as Eun-yeong, the teacher
- Kim You-jung as Yeong-mi, Gil-su's little sister
- Jo Yeong-jin as Mr. Jang
- Choi Bum-ho as adult Yoon-bok
- Noh Young-hak as Jae-yong
- Moon Ga-young as Bun-rye
- Yeon Joon-seok as Choon-sam
- Won Yoo-bin as Kyeong-sook
- Oh Joo-hee as Soon-deok's mother
- Kim Kyung-ran as grandmother
- Ri Min as village foreman
- Kim Young-jo as truck driver

== Production ==
The film marked Yoo Seung-ho's last work as a child actor.

The shooting of the film took place at the picturesque island of Haui-do, located in Haui-myeon, Mokpo, South Jeolla Province. The place perfectly matched the atmosphere of 1970s, which is the background of the movie, with its small population, clear sea water, sandy beaches, mud flats, and the very school depicted in the storyline. The filming process embraced the authenticity of the island, utilizing nearly everything in its natural state.

Prior to the film's release, a blog was created, serving as an informative source for the fans providing an overview of the film's making, insights into cast members, behind-the-scenes stories and news.

Originally named "My Teacher", the film underwent a title change to "Do You See Seoul?". This decision of the production company was motivated by a belief that the latter title was more suitable and attractive to the audience.

The poster shooting for the film took place at Gokseong Station where a train that had originally operated in 1968 was located in order to preserve the authentic ambiance of the 1970s — the historical setting of the movie.

== Release ==
Although the film was originally shot in 2006, its official premiere was postponed for two years. The release date was scheduled for May 8, 2008. It was strategically chosen because of the relations between children, parents and teachers, subject of the film. May is recognized as the Family Month in Korea, celebrating Children's Day on May 5, Parents' Day on May 8, and Teachers' Day on May 15.
