= Master of Study =

2010 South Korean television series

- Promotional poster
- Hangul: 공부의 신
- Hanja: 工夫의 神
- RR: Gongbuui sin
- MR: Kongbuŭi sin
- Genre: Teen
- Based on: Dragon Zakura by Norifusa Mita
- Written by: Yoon Kyung-ah
- Directed by: Yoo Hyun-ki
- Starring: Kim Soo-ro; Bae Doona; Oh Yoon-ah; Yoo Seung-ho; Go Ah-sung; Lee Hyun-woo; Park Ji-yeon; Lee Chan-ho
- Opening theme: "Dreams Come True" by 4Minute
- Ending theme: "Dreams Come True"
- Country of origin: South Korea
- Original languages: Korean; English
- No. of episodes: 16

Production
- Production locations: Suwon, Busan
- Running time: 70 minutes on Mondays and Tuesdays at 21:55 (KST)
- Production company: Drama House

Original release
- Network: Korean Broadcasting System
- Release: January 4 – February 23, 2010

Related
- Dragon Zakura

Master of Study (Korean: 공부의 신; RR: Gongbuui sin; lit. God of Study / Lord of Study) is a South Korean television series that aired on KBS2 from January 4 to February 23, 2010, on Mondays and Tuesdays at 21:55 for 16 episodes. It stars Kim Soo-ro, Bae Doona, Oh Yoon-ah, Yoo Seung-ho, Go Ah-sung, Lee Hyun-woo, Park Ji-yeon, and Lee Chan-ho.

Based on the Japanese comic series Dragon Zakura, it is about a determined lawyer who takes up a teaching position at a failing high school. To save the school from the ax, he comes up with the unconventional plan of starting a special class curriculum devoted to getting five students into the country's top university.

Master of Study achieved nationwide, as well as international success, topping ratings during its 2-month run and scoring multiple nods in different local and overseas awards ceremonies. The series is also one of KBS's most watched series online.

== Synopsis ==
When scrappy and abrasive lawyer Kang Suk-ho is put in charge of the liquidating Byung Moon High School, he sees his own troubled past in the problematic students who live their lives with no dreams. He then offers to teach them and proclaims that he will get five students accepted into Cheonha University, the most prestigious college in the country. Earnest English teacher Han Soo-jung, who believes that the purpose of education is not about getting into a good college, likewise initially objects to Suk-ho's teaching methods and motivations. But he establishes a special class for the five delinquent students, including Hwang Baek-hyun, who bumps heads right away with Suk-ho, to help them prepare for Cheonha University.

== Cast ==
=== Main ===
- Kim Soo-ro as Kang Suk-ho (강석호)

He is a lawyer who is put in charge of the liquidating Byung Moon High School. He is initially unwilling to do so, but he recalls the help he received during his time at Byung Moon High, which helped him change from a delinquent teenager who frequently fought, into a relatively successful person in society. Thus, he comes up with the plan of setting up a "special class" that aims to get students into Cheonha University to improve the school's reputation. He also intends to reform the teaching staff at the school.
His proposals are met with stiff resistance from the staff, the parents and the students of the school. However, his headstrong attitude manages to push through his reforms, and he eventually manages to help the five students from the special class achieve high grades in the college entrance examination.

- Bae Doona as Han Soo-jung (한수정)

An English teacher at Byung Moon High School. She gets tricked into becoming a teaching assistant of the special class, though she later becomes very passionate about this responsibility.

- Oh Yoon-ah as Jang Ma-ri (장마리)

The principal of the school, after the previous principal (who is also her father), is hospitalized. She reluctantly allows Suk-ho to set up a special class under strict conditions after he threatens that her financial indiscretions would come to light. Later, she takes over Soo-jung's classes to concentrate her duties as an assistant to the special class. Eventually, she starts to develop a crush on Suk-ho. After he leaves the school, she sets up a "special, special class" that is modeled after his special class idea.

- Yoo Seung-ho as Hwang Baek-hyun (황백현)

He has lived with his grandmother in a poor house ever since his parents died. He is a bad student (Koltong), but after he studies in the special class with the help of Kang Suk-ho, he slowly realizes his potential. Later, he goes to Tae Pyeong University to study to be a doctor.

- Go Ah-sung as Gil Pul-ip (길풀입)

She grew up with a single parent, and has problems with her mother who loves a married man. A hardworking student, she enters the top university, Cheonha University.

- Lee Hyun-woo as Hong Chan-doo (홍찬두)

He loves dancing, but faces opposition from his father who wants him to study abroad. Later, his father finally relents, and Hong Chan-doo chooses to give up college to pursue dance.

- Park Ji-yeon as Na Hyun-jung (나현정)

She has a crush on Hwang Baek-hyun. When she finds out that he loves Gil Pul-ip, she loses her way for a short time. However, she comes back to the special class and eventually pursues her love for drawing.

- Lee Chan-ho as Oh Bong-goo (오봉구)

He grew up in a meat restaurant, and his parents do not really care about his education. The actual reason that he joined the special class was to get rid of the bullying caused by his appearance. Later, he enters Cheonha University.

=== Supporting ===
- Byun Hee-bong as Cha Ki-bong
- Lee Byung-joon as Anthony Yang
- Im Ji-eun as Lee Eun-yoo
- Ko Joo-yeon as Lee Ye-ji
- Shim Hyung-tak as Jang Young-shik
- Park Chil-yong as Ha Sang-gil
- Lee Dal-hyung as Park Nam
- Im Sung-min as Bae Young-sook
- Kim Young-ok as Lee Boon-yi
- Bang Eun-hee as Han Ae-shim
- Kim Ha-kyun as Oh Dal-shik
- Park Chul-ho as Hong Choong-shik
- Koo Hye-ryung as Hwang Geum-joo
- Kang Yi-seul as Kim Jung-hee
- Park Hwi-soon as Sa Do-chul
- T-ara as cameo (ep 7, 8, 10)
- Jeon Ji-hoo as supporting
- Hong Il-kwon

== Production ==
This was Kim Soo-ro's first leading role in a television drama (he had previously appeared mainly in films). Kim, who played a humanistic teacher in the film Our School's E.T., yet plays a completely opposite role as Kang Suk-ho in Master of Study, said that "both methods are correct. Kang Suk-ho's method is appropriate for the children in the drama, who want to prove themselves by getting into a good school." He added that the show is not about the obvious cliché—that high school seniors must study for college, but rather about taking on the challenge of getting into the top school just to get back at the credential-obsessed society.

Dragon Zakura creator/artist Norifusa Mita complimented the show, saying, "It is energetic and entertaining. The characters have depth. I am satisfied." The popular manga was also turned into a 2005 TBS drama series in Japan.

== Release ==
The drama premiered in South Korea on January 4, 2010. It received a nationwide rating of 15,1%.

The drama was released in 2 DVD box sets in Japan, the first DVD-Box1 on November 19, 2010, and the second DVD-Box2 on December 3, 2010, by Culture Publishers. Each DVD-BOX is a set of 4 discs.

== Critical reception ==
People's Daily praised the drama for achieved cultural penetration and artistic subversion especially considering that it's a remake. It also pointed that despite the strong "comedy color" of the show, the specific learning methods still have a positive impact on the audience.

== Ratings ==
Master of Study scored solid ratings since its premiere and eventually became the top-rated show in its Monday and Tuesday evening time slot. According to daily statistics released by research firms TNS Media Korea and AGB Nielsen Media Research, the drama scored national viewership ratings of 26.8 and 25.1 percent, respectively, for its final episode, the highest ratings the show recorded during its two-month airing.

| Episode | Broadcast date | TNS Ratings | | AGB Ratings | |
| Episode | Broadcast date | Nationwide | Seoul region | Nationwide | Seoul region |
|---|---|---|---|---|---|
| Ep. 1 | January 4, 2010 | 15.1% | 15.8% | 13.4% | 14.0% |
| Ep. 2 | January 5, 2010 | 18.5% | 19.3% | 15.9% | 17.0% |
| Ep. 3 | January 11, 2010 | 23.1% | 23.1% | 21.2% | 22.0% |
| Ep. 4 | January 12, 2010 | 26.3% | 26.7% | 23.5% | 23.9% |
| Ep. 5 | January 18, 2010 | 25.9% | 26.0% | 23.2% | 23.8% |
| Ep. 6 | January 19, 2010 | 24.2% | 24.3% | 23.5% | 23.9% |
| Ep. 7 | January 25, 2010 | 24.6% | 25.0% | 21.7% | 21.2% |
| Ep. 8 | January 26, 2010 | 24.7% | 24.5% | 22.8% | 22.5% |
| Ep. 9 | February 1, 2010 | 24.3% | 24.3% | 21.4% | 21.2% |
| Ep. 10 | February 2, 2010 | 22.6% | 22.6% | 22.0% | 24.5% |
| Ep. 11 | February 8, 2010 | 23.2% | 22.8% | 22.5% | 22.6% |
| Ep. 12 | February 9, 2010 | 23.7% | 23.9% | 22.9% | 22.3% |
| Ep. 13 | February 15, 2010 | 21.3% | 21.6% | 20.6% | 19.1% |
| Ep. 14 | February 16, 2010 | 24.2% | 23.5% | 22.5% | 22.2% |
| Ep. 15 | February 22, 2010 | 25.0% | 25.7% | 23.2% | 22.0% |
| Ep. 16 | February 23, 2010 | 26.2% | 26.8% | 25.5% | 25.3% |
| Average Ratings | | 23.3% | 23.5% | 21.6% | 21.7% |

== Impact and legacy ==
The show became a huge success, especially in South East Asia, mostly loved for its "school theme". The show became an incentive for students, mainly high school students. People's Daily reported that the TV series had a strong impact on many children and students suddenly become interested in studying.

KBS's official YouTube channel KBS World released the full series on YouTube on 2015. It has amassed over 20,000,000 views since — making it one of the channel's most watched dramas.

== Awards and nominations ==
| Year | Award | Category | Recipient | Result | Ref. |
|---|---|---|---|---|---|
| 2010 | 46th Baeksang Arts Awards | Actor Excellence Award - TV | Kim Soo-ro | Nominated | |
| 2010 | 46th Baeksang Arts Awards | Best New Director - TV | Yoo Hyun-ki | Won | |
| 2010 | 46th Baeksang Arts Awards | Best New Actor - TV | Yoo Seung-ho | Nominated | |
| 2010 | 46th Baeksang Arts Awards | Best New Actress - TV | Go Ah-sung | Nominated | |
| 2010 | 46th Baeksang Arts Awards | Male Popularity Award - TV | Kim Soo-ro | Nominated | |
| 2010 | 46th Baeksang Arts Awards | Male Popularity Award - TV | Yoo Seung-ho | Nominated | |
| 2010 | 46th Baeksang Arts Awards | Female Popularity Award - TV | Park Ji-yeon | Nominated | |
| 2010 | 46th Baeksang Arts Awards | Female Popularity Award - TV | Go Ah-sung | Nominated | |
| 2010 | 3rd Korea Drama Awards | Best Actor | Kim Soo-ro | Nominated | |
| 2010 | KBS Drama Awards | Excellence Award, Actor in a Miniseries | Yoo Seung-ho | Nominated | |
| 2010 | KBS Drama Awards | Excellence Award, Actor in a Miniseries | Kim Soo-ro | Won | |
| 2010 | KBS Drama Awards | Excellence Award, Actress in a Miniseries | Bae Doona | Nominated | |
| 2010 | KBS Drama Awards | Excellence Award, Actress in a Miniseries | Oh Yoon-ah | Nominated | |
| 2010 | KBS Drama Awards | Best Supporting Actor | Byun Hee-bong | Nominated | |
| 2010 | KBS Drama Awards | Best Supporting Actress | Im Ji-eun | Nominated | |
| 2010 | KBS Drama Awards | Best New Actress | Go Ah-sung | Nominated | |
| 2010 | KBS Drama Awards | Best New Actress | Park Ji-yeon | Nominated | |
| 2010 | KBS Drama Awards | Netizens' Award, Actor | Yoo Seung-ho | Nominated | |
| 2010 | KBS Drama Awards | Netizens' Award, Actress | Bae Doona | Nominated | |
| 2010 | KBS Drama Awards | Best Couple Award | Yoo Seung-ho and Park Ji-yeon | Nominated | |
| 2010 | DramaBeans Awards | Breakout Performance of The Year | Go Ah-sung | Nominated | |
| 2010 | DramaBeans Awards | Breakout Performance of The Year | Lee Hyun-woo | Nominated | |
| 2010 | DramaBeans Awards | Best Use of an Idol Star | Park Ji-yeon | Nominated | |
| 2010 | Korea Best Dressed Swan Awards | Best Dressed, TV Actor category | Yoo Seung-ho | Won | |
