= Lee Hyun-woo (actor, born 1993) =

South Korean actor and singer

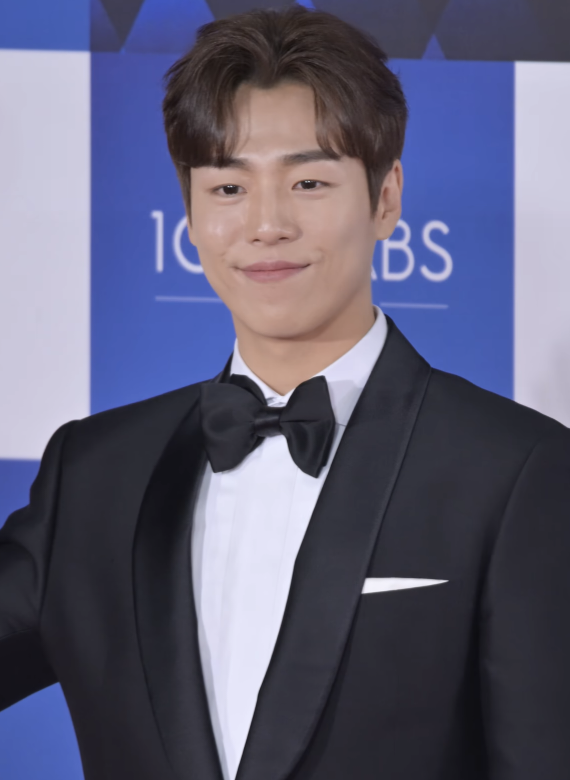
- Lee in November 2022
- Born: March 23, 1993 (age 33); Seoul, South Korea
- Education: Dongguk University
- Occupations: Actor; singer
- Years active: 2005–present
- Agent: Awesome ENT

Korean name
- Hangul: 이현우
- Hanja: 李玹雨
- RR: I Hyeonu
- MR: I Hyŏnu

Lee Hyun-woo (Korean: 이현우; born March 23, 1993) is a South Korean actor and singer. He began his career as a child actor, and later featured in the television series Master of Study (2010) and To the Beautiful You (2012). Lee gained recognition with his role as a North Korean spy in the 2013 film Secretly, Greatly, as well as the films The Con Artists (2014) and Money Heist: Korea – Joint Economic Area (2022). He played lead roles in the television series Moorim School: Saga of the Brave (2016) and The Liar and His Lover (2017).

== Career ==
=== 2005–2011: Beginnings as a child actor ===
Lee began his career as a child actor, building up his resume by playing roles in a number of large-scale productions, such as The Legend, The Great King, Sejong, The Return of Iljimae, and Queen Seondeok. He rose to fame for his role in Master of Study, a Korean screen adaptation of Japanese manga Dragon Zakura. The same year, Lee took to the stage for the 2010 musical production of Footloose, where he played the leading role of Ren.

In 2011, he and K-pop singer Yoon Doo-joon (from Beast) began hosting the music program Music on Top for cable channel JTBC. He was then featured in IU's music video for the song "You and I". Lee further expanded his acting scope in historical drama Gyebaek, revenge thriller Man from the Equator, and made a guest appearance in medical drama Brain.

=== 2012–2018: Rising popularity ===
In 2012, Lee co-starred in To the Beautiful You, the Korean television adaptation of Japanese manga Hana-Kimi, with his role based on the character Shuichi Nakatsu. Despite low ratings during its domestic run, To the Beautiful You led to increased Korean Wave exposure for Lee in countries such as Singapore, Malaysia, Taiwan and China. He and co-star Hwang Kwang-hee were later announced as the new hosts of live music show Inkigayo. His breakthrough continued when he landed a major role in 2013 box office hit Secretly, Greatly, an action-comedy film in which he played a North Korean undercover spy disguised as a high school boy. Lee also sang "Ode to Youth" for the film's soundtrack. He became the first male celebrity to be appointed ambassador of the Puchon International Film Festival.

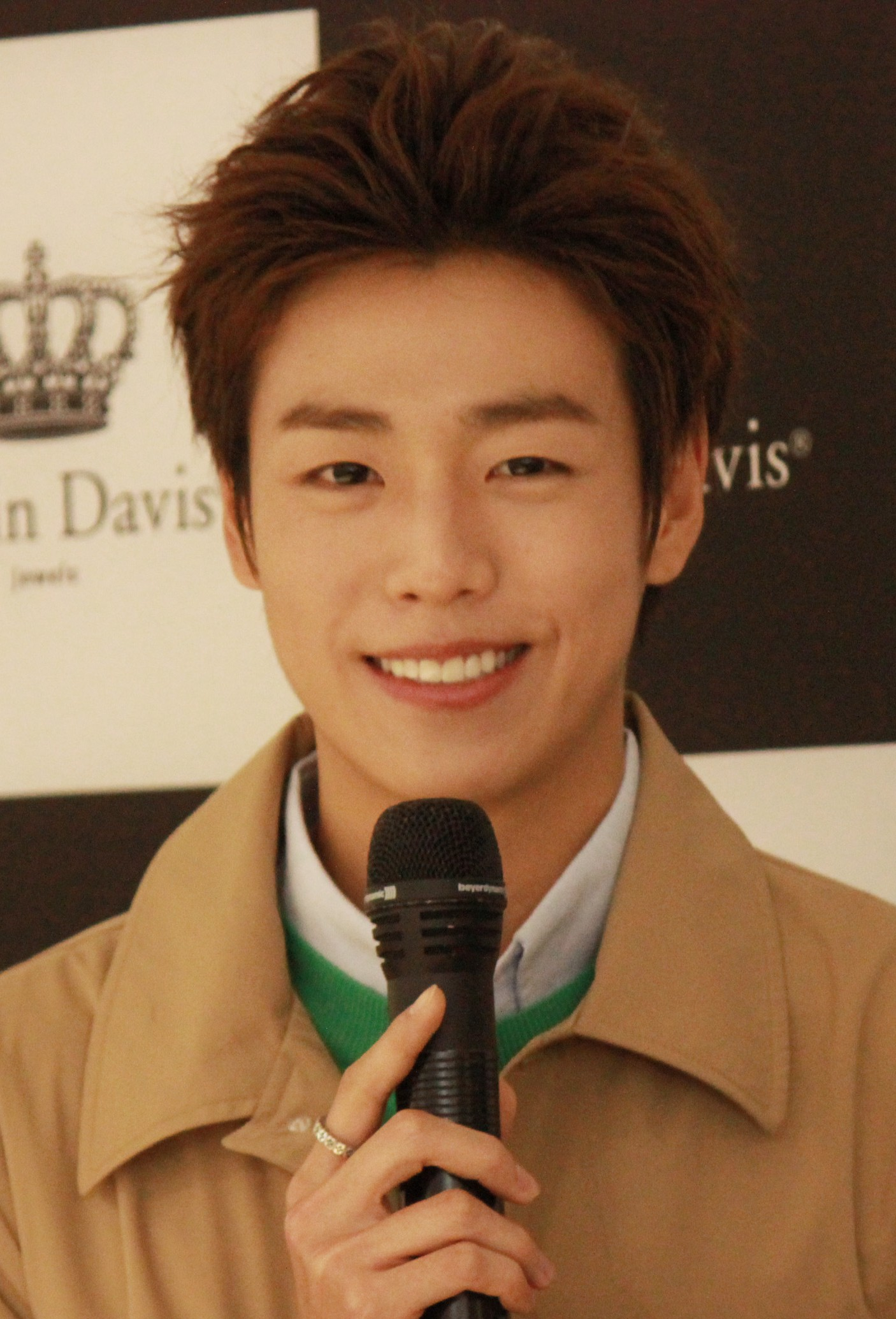
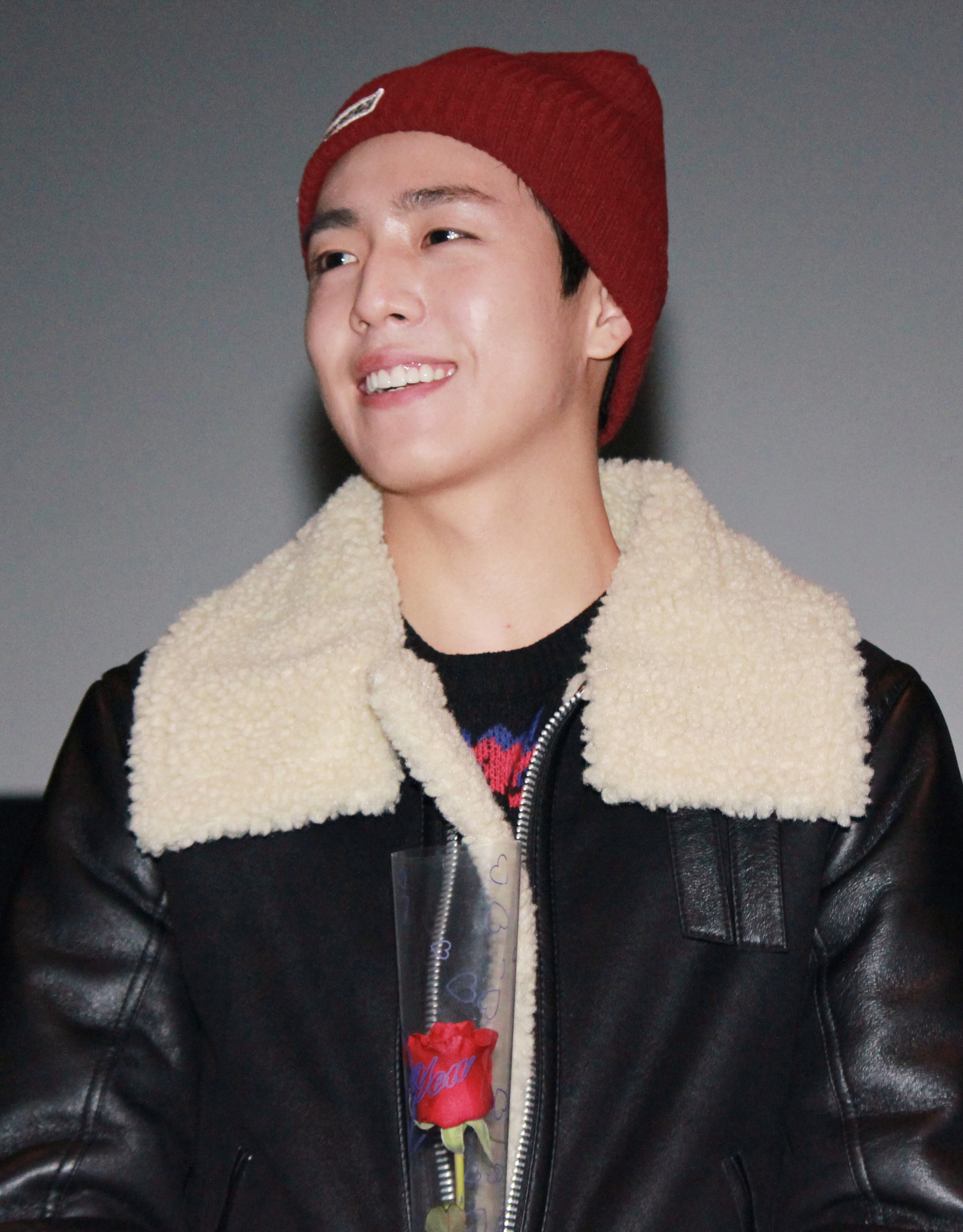
Lee in 2014 (L) and 2015 (R)

In 2014, he and real-life best friend Park Ji-bin (both were child actors and belong to the same agency) appeared in the travel/reality show Real Mate in Saipan. Lee next played a hacker in the heist movie The Con Artists. He then starred in Northern Limit Line, a 2015 naval thriller about the Second Battle of Yeonpyeong. The film sold 6,024,894 tickets (grossing US$38,945,231), making it the most-watched Korean film in 2015. In 2016, he starred in the fantasy youth drama Moorim School: Saga of the Brave. Initially slated for 20 episodes, the drama was reduced to 16 episodes instead due to low ratings. In 2017, Lee starred in the drama The Liar and His Lover, the Korean remake of the Japanese manga Kanojo wa Uso o Aishisugiteru alongside Red Velvet's Joy. In 2018, Lee released a digital single titled "Twenty-Six", prior to joining the army.

=== 2022–present ===
In 2022, Lee returned to the small screen with the Netflix drama Money Heist: Korea – Joint Economic Area, his first work on the small screen in five years.

== Personal life ==
=== Military service ===
On February 19, 2018, Lee began his mandatory military service as an active duty soldier. He completed his military service and was discharged on October 19, 2019.

== Filmography ==
=== Film ===
Year	Title	Role	Notes	Ref.
2005	Baribari Jjang			
2006	Holiday			
2006	A Dirty Carnival	young Min-ho		
2007	Hwang Jin Yi	young Nomi		
2010	The Loneliness of Butcher Boy	Tae-shik	Short film	
2011	GLove	Kim Jin-man		
2013	Secretly, Greatly	Rhee Hae-jin		
2014	The Con Artists	Jong-bae		
2015	Northern Limit Line	Park Dong-hyuk		
2015	The Beauty Inside	Woo-jin		
2022	Hero	Yoo Dong-ha		
2023	Dream	Kim In-sun		
2024	Dog Days	Hyeon		

=== Television series ===
Year	Title	Role	Notes	Ref.
2004	Oolla Boolla Blue-jjang			
2005	Spring Day			
2006	Hwarang Fighter Maru	Seo Da-ham		
2007	The Legend	Young Cheoro		
2007	Lobbyist	Young Harry		
2008	The Great King, Sejong	Prince Choong-nyeong		
2008	Four Colours of Love	Lee Jung-wook	Episode 4: On a Night Sparkling with Stars	
2009	The Return of Iljimae	Cha Dol-yi		
2009	Queen Seondeok	Young Kim Yushin		
2009	What's for Dinner?	Tommy		
2010	Master of Study	Hong Chan-doo		
2011	Gyebaek	Young Gyebaek		
2011	Brain	Park Dong-hwa	Guest appearance in episodes 1–4	
2012	Man from the Equator	Young Kim Sun-woo		
2012	To the Beautiful You	Cha Eun-gyul		
2015	Run Toward Tomorrow	Kang Moon-jae	KBS Drama Special	
2015	The Scholar Who Walks the Night	Prince Jeonghyeon	Cameo (Episode 1)	
2016	Moorim School: Saga of the Brave	Yoon Shi-woo		
2017	The Liar and His Lover	Kang Han-gyul		
2022	Money Heist: Korea – Joint Economic Area	Rio / Han Joseph	Part 1–2	
2023–2024	A Good Day to Be a Dog	Lee Bo-gyeom		
2024	Cinderella at 2 AM	Lee Seong-min		

=== Web series ===
Year	Title	Role	Notes	Ref.
2025	Bound at First Sight	Gao Song		

=== Music video appearances ===
Year	Title	Artist	Ref.
2005	"Jump"	Haha	
2011	"You and I"	IU	
2012	"First Love's Melody"	Acoustic Collabo	
2013	"I Love You"	Akdong Musician	
2016	"Ordinary Love"	KCM	
2019	"Above the Time"	IU	

Year	Title	Ref.
December 8, 2011 – March 14, 2012	Music on Top	
December 16, 2012 – January 26, 2014	Inkigayo	

== Theatre ==
Year	Title	Role	Ref.
2010	Footloose	Ren McCormack	

== Discography ==
=== Singles ===
Title	Year	Peak chart position	Sales	Album
Title	Year	KOR Gaon	Sales	Album
Collaborations
"Your Face" (with Louie of Geeks)	2016	54	KOR: 33,201	Non-album singles
"Feel So Good" (with O Broject)	2016	—	—N/a	Non-album singles
"Twenty-six"	2018	—	—N/a	Non-album singles
As featured artist
"It's a Lie" (O Broject feat. Lee Hyun-woo & Vromance)	2015	—	—N/a	Non-album single
Soundtrack appearances
"Ode to Youth"	2013	—	—N/a	Secretly, Greatly OST
"One Thing"	2016	—	—N/a	Moorim School: Saga of the Brave OST
"I'm Okay" (Joy feat. Lee Hyun-woo)	2017	85	KOR: 22,513	The Liar and His Lover OST
"—" denotes releases that did not chart or were not released in that region.

== Awards and nominations ==
Name of the award ceremony, year presented, category, nominated work and the result of the nomination
Award	Year	Category	Nominated work	Result	Ref.
KBS Drama Awards	2008	Best Young Actor	The Great King, Sejong	Won	
KBS Drama Awards	2012	Best New Actor	Man from the Equator	Nominated	
SBS Drama Awards	2012	New Star Award	To the Beautiful You	Won	
22nd Buil Film Awards	2013	Best New Actor	Secretly, Greatly	Nominated	
34th Blue Dragon Film Awards	2013	Best New Actor	Secretly, Greatly	Nominated	
SBS Entertainment Awards	2013	Best Newcomer Award	Inkigayo	Nominated	
9th Asia Model Awards	2014	New Star Award	Secretly, Greatly	Won	
16th Seoul International Youth Film Festival	2014	Best Young Actor	Secretly, Greatly	Nominated	
52nd Grand Bell Awards	2015	Best New Actor	Northern Limit Line	Nominated	
30th Korea Best Dresser Swan Awards	2015	Rising Star Award	Northern Limit Line	Won	
49th WorldFest-Houston International Film Festival	2016	Best Supporting Actor Award	Northern Limit Line	Won	
