= Papadog =

South Korean animated television series

- Genre: Comedy
- Created by: Seok Jong-seo
- Voices of: Kim Seo-young; Choi Han; Kim Hyeon-ji; Lee So-eun
- Country of origin: South Korea
- Original language: Korean
- No. of seasons: 2
- No. of episodes: 45

Production
- Running time: 22-24 minutes

Original release
- Network: KBS 2TV; Tooniverse
- Release: February 12, 2016 – July 10, 2019

Papadog (Korean: 파파독), is a South Korean animated television series created by Seok Jong-seo. The series is produced by CJ ENM. The series aired on KBS 2TV from February 12, 2016, to July 10, 2019, and on Tooniverse from February 17, 2016, to August 28, 2019.

The series was streamed online on YouTube.

== Characters and casts ==
- Class (유별; Kim Seo-young)
- Papadog (파파독; Choi Han)
- Baekhyanggi (백향기; Kim Hyeon-ji)
- Snow White (백설기; Lee So-eun)

== Production and release ==
In February 2016, CJ ENM's Tooniverse announced that the show will be released on February 12, 2016, on KBS 2TV and February 17, 2016, on Tooniverse.

Season 2 will be released on June 7, 2018, on KBS 2TV and on Tooniverse on August 8, 2018.
