= Dragon Zakura (TV series) =

- Poster
- Genre: School drama
- Written by: Takehiko Hata
- Directed by: Renpei Tsukamoto, Marehiro Karaki, Takashi Komatsu
- Starring: Hiroshi Abe
- Theme music composer: Kyo Nakanishi
- Country of origin: Japan
- Original language: Japanese
- No. of seasons: 2
- No. of episodes: 22

Production
- Editors: Kouichi Enda, Mayumi Shimizu
- Production companies: Media Mix Japan Co., Ltd, TBS

Original release
- Network: TBS
- Release: July 8 – September 16, 2005

Related
- Master of Study

Dragon Zakura (ドラゴン桜, Dragon Zakūra), also known as Dragon-Zakura, is a Japanese live action television series based on the manga of the same name.

== Cast ==
=== Teachers ===
- Hiroshi Abe as Kenji Sakuragi, a lawyer and the homeroom teacher for the special class
- Kyōko Hasegawa as Mamako Ino, an English teacher from Ryūzan High School. She takes care of History lessons for the special class.
- Yōko Nogiwa as Yuriko Tatsuno, the director of Ryūzan High School and the wife of former owner
- Yôsuke Saitô as Tokihisa Kondō, the vice-principal of Ryūzan High School.
- David Ito as Masanao Ochiai, a teacher from Ryūzan High School
- Tōru Shinagawa as Tetsunosuke Yanagi, the Mathematics teacher for the special class
- Minori Terada - Ryūzaburō Akutayama, the Japanese language teacher for the special class. His name is a comical reference to Ryūnosuke Akutagawa.
- Susumu Kobayashi as Shutaro Ain, the Science teacher for the special class
- Akio Kaneda as Hiroshi Kawaguchi, the English language teacher for the special class
- Shin Yazawa as Nozomi Yamamoto, Mamako's friend and a teacher of Shūmeikan High School.

=== Students of the special class ===
- Tomohisa Yamashita as Yūsuke Yajima
- Masami Nagasawa as Naomi Mizuno
- Teppei Koike as Hideki Ogata
- Yui Aragaki as Yoshino Kōsaka
- Akiyoshi Nakao as Ichirō Okuno
- Saeko as Maki Kobayashi

=== Family members of special class students ===
- Mako Ishino as Setsuko Yajima, Yūsuke's mother
- Jun Miho as Yūko Mizuno, Naomi's mother
- Kei Sunaga as Kōsei Ogata, Hideki's father
- Tomoko Aihara as Mariko Ogata, Hideki's mother
- Yōko Kurita as Megumi Kōsaka, Yoshino's mother
- Kazuko Katō as Miyako Okuno, Ichirō's mother
- Momosuke Mizutani as Jirō Okuno, Ichirō's twin brother. He is a student of Shūmeikan High School)
- Nobue Iketani as Mitsue Kobayashi, Maki's mother

=== Other students of Ryūzan High School ===
- Akari Hori as Asumi Toda, an idol who repeatedly sends Maki e-mails from her workplace
- Ayano Gunji as Saori Abe, Naomi's friend. She had requested Naomi to introduce her to Yūsuke

=== Others ===
- Hiroki Murakami as Yoshio Tanaka, one of Nozomi's suitors. He is a law graduate of Tokyo University. An arrogant man, he is proud of his academic and social standing even though he is neither handsome nor fit.
- Mitsuru Karahashi as Yasushi Sawamatsu, the second suitor of Nozomi. A high school dropout, he is rather simple-minded with "awesome" as his favorite phrase and a very limited vocabulary. His favorite pastime is playing Pachinko and he only has a part-time job.

== Episodes ==
Ep.	Title	Romanized title	Translation of title	Broadcast date	Ratings
1	バカとブスこそ東大へ行け	Baka to busu koso Toudai e ike	All you that are ugly and stupid, go to Tokyo University!	July 8, 2005	17.5%
2	自分の弱さを知れ!	Jibun no yowasa wo shire!	Know your weaknesses!	July 15, 2005	16.5%
3	遊べ!受験はスポーツだ!	Asobe! Juken wa supootsu da!	Entrance exams are sports, so play!	July 22, 2005	13.8%
4	壁にぶつかるまで我慢しろ	Kabe ni butsukaru made gaman shiro	Hold out until you hit the wall	July 29, 2005	16.1%
5	泣くな!お前の人生だ!	Nakuna! Omae no jinsei da!	Don't cry! It's your life!	August 5, 2005	16.8%
6	英語対決!勝負だバカ6人	Eigo taiketsu! Shoubu da baka rokunin	English showdown! Fight for Stupid 6	August 12, 2005	17.9%
7	見返してやる!東大模試	Mikaeshite yaru! Toudai moshi	Vengeance! Mock exam for Tokyo University	August 19, 2005	15.6%
8	バカの涙･･･夏休み課外授業	Baka no namida... Natsuyasumi kagai jugyou	Tears of fools... Extra lessons during summer vacation	August 26, 2005	17.0%
9	信じろ!成績は必ず上がる	Shinjiro! Seiseki wa kanarazu agaru	Trust yourself! Your marks will surely improve	September 2, 2005	14.5%
10	友情か受験か?最後の決断	Yuujou ka juken ka? Saigo no ketsudan	Friendship or entrance exam? Final decision	September 9, 2005	14.5%
11	お前らはもうバカじゃない!運命の合格発表!	Omaera wa mou baka janai! Unmei no goukaku happyou!	You are no longer morons! Fateful day of results!	September 16, 2005	20.3%
Ratings for Kanto region (average rating: 16.41%)

== Theme song ==
The theme song of the show is "Realize" by melody. and the insert song "Colorful" by Tomohisa Yamashita.

Preceded by Tiger & Dragon (15/04/2005 - 24/06/2005)	TBS Friday Dramas 金曜ドラマ; Fridays 22:00 - 22:54 (JST)	Succeeded by Hana Yori Dango (21/10/2005 - 16/12/2005)
