= Jo Dong-hyuk =

South Korean actor

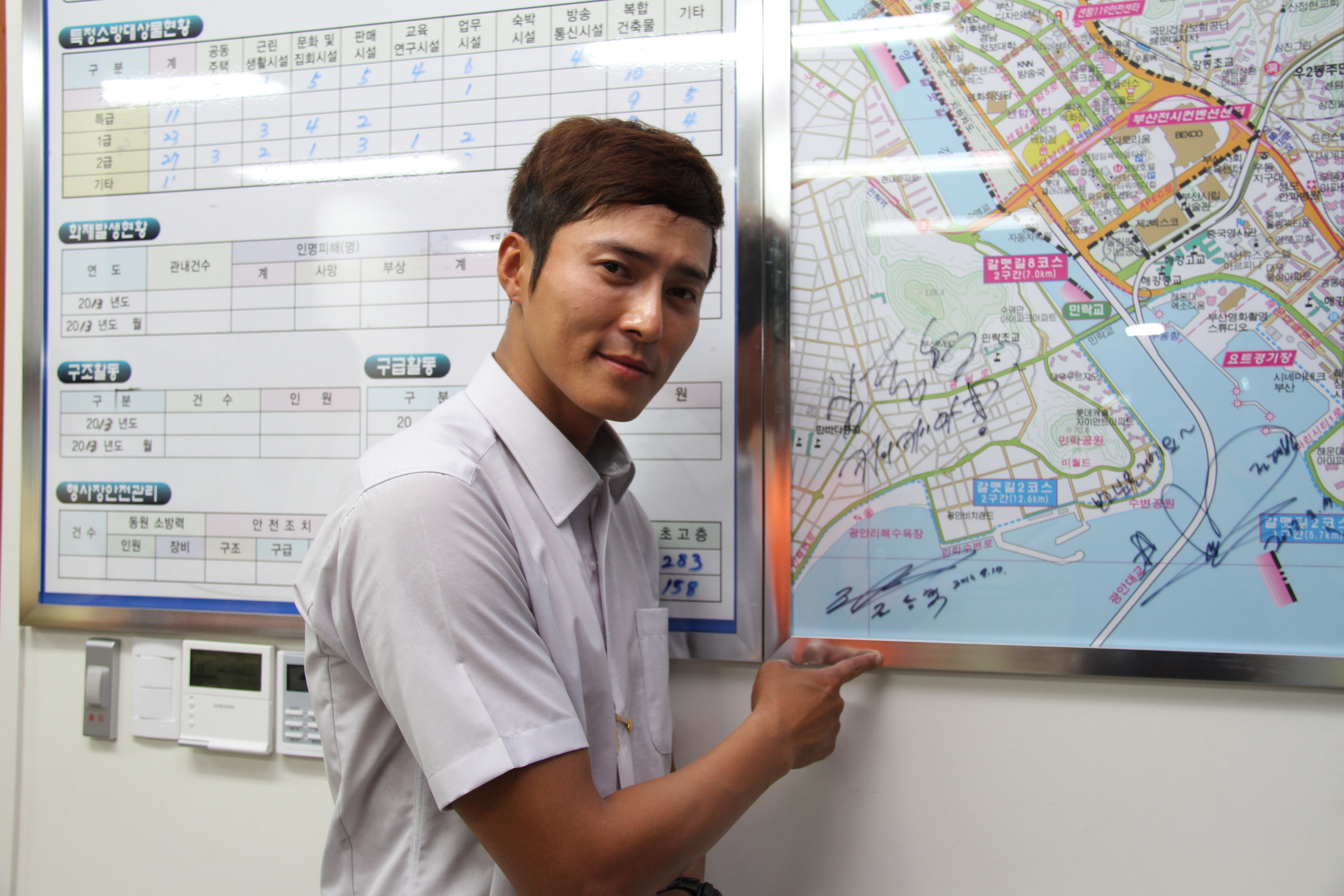
- Jo in 2013
- Born: December 11, 1977 (age 48); South Korea
- Occupation: Actor
- Years active: 2002–present
- Agent: J-Flow Company

Korean name
- Hangul: 조동혁
- Hanja: 趙東赫
- RR: Jo Donghyeok
- MR: Cho Tonghyŏk

Jo Dong-hyuk (born December 11, 1977) is a South Korean actor. He made his acting debut in Make It Big (2002), followed by erotic films Hypnotized (2004), The Intimate (2005), and Searching for the Elephant (2009). On television, Jo starred in family dramas Likeable or Not (2007) and The Moon and Stars for You (2012), period action thriller Yaksha (2010), and medical drama Brain (2011).

== Filmography ==
=== Television series ===
- Rugal (2020) as Han Tae-woong
- Love Affairs in the Afternoon (2019) as Do Ha-yoon
- Bad Guys 2 (2017-2018) as Tae-soo (cameo)
- The K2 (tvN, 2016) as JSS Special Ops captain (Ep. 8)
- Detective Alice (web drama) (Naver TV Cast, 2016)
- Late Night Restaurant (SBS, 2015) (guest)
- Bad Guys (OCN, 2014)
- Inspiring Generation (KBS2, 2014)
- She is Wow! (tvN, 2013) (cameo)
- Moon and Stars for You (KBS1, 2012)
- Brain (KBS2, 2011)
- Yaksha (OCN, 2010)
- Winter Bird (MBC, 2007) (cameo)
- Likeable or Not (KBS1, 2007)
- Snow in August (SBS, 2007)
- The Person I Love (SBS, 2007)
- Mr. Goodbye (KBS2, 2006)
- Young-jae's Golden Days (MBC, 2005)
- Ms. Kim's Million Dollar Quest (SBS, 2004)

=== Film ===
- The Mujeogang (TBA) as Lee Jun-ho
- Blood is thicker than water (2022) as Doohyun
- Love At The End of The World (2015)
- Camellia (2010; segment "Kamome")
- Searching for the Elephant (2009)
- Love House (2006)
- The Intimate (2005)
- Hypnotized (2004)
- Make It Big (2002) (bit part)

=== Variety shows ===
- Mr. House Husband 2 (2022–present)
- Cool Kiz On the Block
- Beating Hearts (2013-2014)
- SNL Korea - Season 4 (2013) (host - season 4, episode 21)
- Adrenaline - Season 2 (2013)
- My Partner (2010)
- Invincible Saturday (2010)
- Let's Go Dream Team! Season 2 (2009)
- Kko Kko Tours Single Single 2 (2008)

=== Music video appearances ===
- Lee Jung-bong - "Love Sha La La" (2013)
- Dreamcatcher - "Chase Me" (2017)
- Dreamcatcher - "Good Night" (2017)

== Theater ==
- Fool for Love (2010)

== Awards ==
- 2012 Asia Model Awards: Beautiful Brand Federation Popularity Award
- 2007 Andre Kim Best Star Awards: Best Newcomer
- SIEG Model Contest: Second Place
