= Homo Academicus =

South Korean television program

- Hangul: 공부하는 인간: 호모 아카데미쿠스
- Hanja: 工夫하는人間: 호모 아카데미쿠스
- RR: Gongbuhaneun ingan: Homo Akademikuseu
- MR: Kongbuhanŭn in'gan: Homo Ak'ademik'usŭ
- Genre: Documentary/News program
- Starring: Lilli Margolin; Scott Yim; Jenny Martin; Bryan Kauder
- Country of origin: South Korea
- Original languages: Korean; English
- No. of episodes: 5

Production
- Producers: 정현모, 남진현
- Running time: 60 minutes

Original release
- Network: KBS1
- Release: February 28, 2013 – present

Homo Academicus (Korean: 공부하는 인간: 호모 아카데미쿠스) is a South Korean documentary television program broadcast by Korean Broadcasting System (KBS). It is narrated by Yoo Seung-ho, and hosted by Lilli Margolin, Scott Yim, Jenny Martin, and Bryan Kauder.

== Premise ==
The program features four Harvard University students who travel the world visiting culturally historic areas and places of learning. The correspondents interview students and parents in an effort to show contemporary methods of and motivations for studying, and to place traditions, conversations, and landmarks in an historical context. The program depicts how cultural differences, privileges, and inequities affect education and styles of learning. It is hosted in English and narrated in Korean, with subtitles for each language. Countries covered by the show's correspondents include China, France, India, Israel, Japan, South Korea, Uganda, and the United States. Partnership with BBC on which to be shown internationally is in the works.

== Overview ==
=== Episode 1 ===
Theme: The Old Desire (오래된 욕망)
Air date: February 28, 2013

=== Episode 2 ===
Theme: Descendants of Confucius (공자의 후예)
Air date: March 7, 2013

=== Episode 3 ===
Theme: Questions and Memorizing (질문과 암기)
Air date: March 14, 2013

=== Episode 4 ===
Theme: The Best Study (최고의 공부)
Air date: March 21, 2013

=== Episode 5 ===
Theme: Speaking of Studying Again (다시 공부를 말하다)
Air date: March 28, 2013

== DVD releases ==
Season One

DVD name	Ep#	Disc#	Release date (South Korea)	Special features
Season 1	5	3	May 21, 2013	All 5 episodes of series
