= Choi Jung-won (actress, born 1981) =

South Korean actress (born 1981)

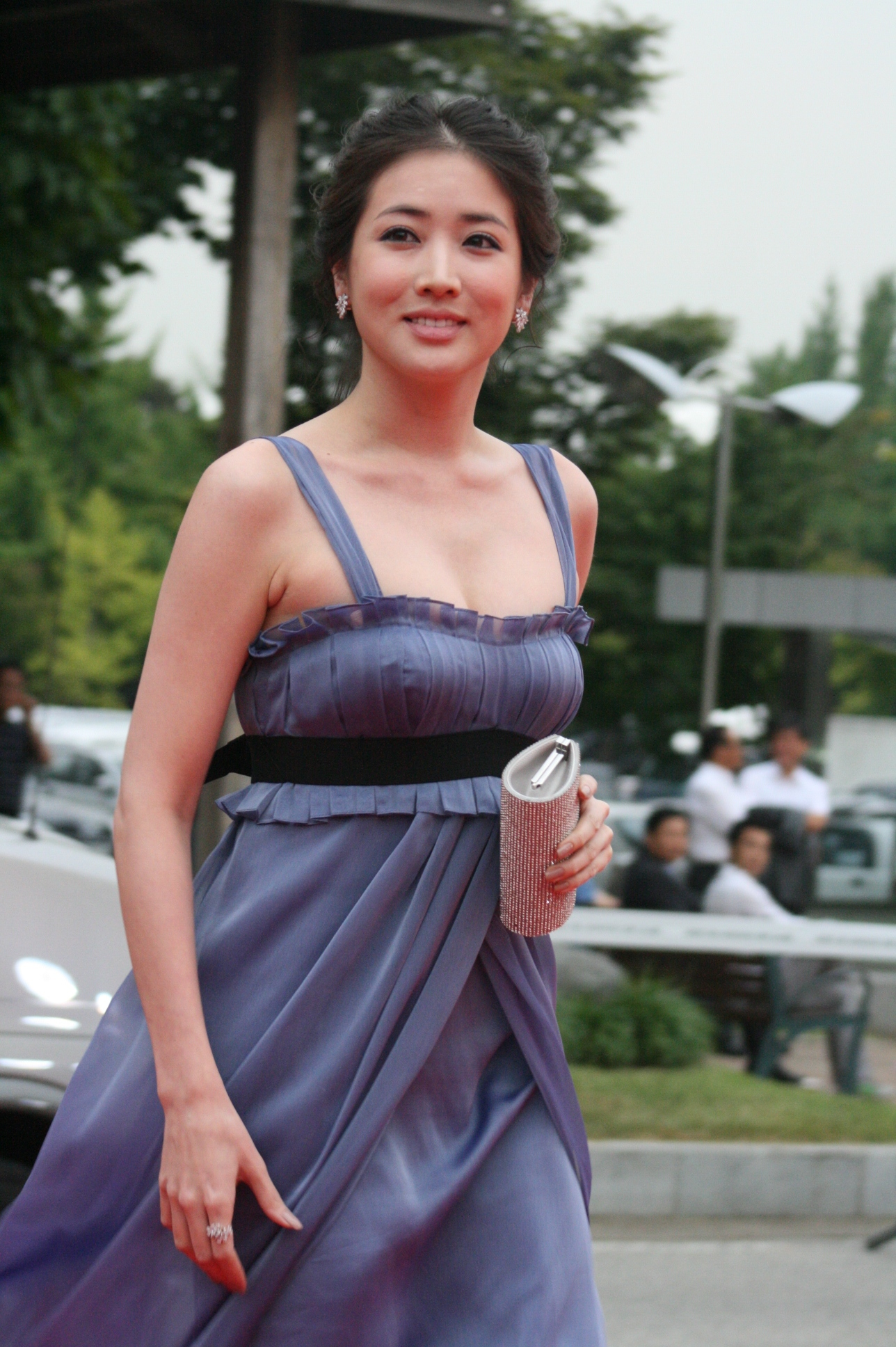
- Choi in 2009
- Born: April 24, 1981 (age 45); Busan, South Korea
- Education: Dongguk University - Theater and Film
- Occupation: Actress
- Years active: 2001–present
- Agent: Imagine Asia
- Family: Choi Jung-min (sister, food stylist)

Korean name
- Hangul: 최정원
- Hanja: 崔貞媛
- RR: Choe Jeongwon
- MR: Ch'oe Chŏngwŏn

Choi Jung-won (Korean: 최정원; born April 24, 1981) is a South Korean actress. She is best known for her roles on TV, notably in family drama Famous Princesses (2006), historical epic The Kingdom of the Winds (2008), romantic comedy Stars Falling from the Sky (2010), and medical drama Brain (2011).

== Filmography ==
=== Television drama ===
- The Three Witches (SBS, 2015)
- Love in Her Bag (jTBC, 2013)
- Brain (KBS2, 2011)
- Stars Falling from the Sky (SBS, 2010)
- The Kingdom of the Winds (KBS2, 2008)
- Famous Princesses (KBS2, 2006)
- The Autumn of Major General Hong (SBS, 2004)
- Tropical Nights in December (MBC, 2004)
- Long Live Love (SBS, 2003)
- Sweetheart (SBS, 2003)
- All In (SBS, 2003)
- Cool (KBS2, 2001)

=== Film ===
- Good Friends (2013)
- Perfect Game (2011)
- Sydney in Love (2009)
- Life is Beautiful (2008)
- My Father (2007)
- Small Town Rivals (2007)

=== Variety shows ===
- Brave Family (KBS2, 2015) (episodes 1-5)
- Real Mate: Choi Jung-won and Choi Jung-min in Toronto (QTV, 2012)
- Choi Jung-won Goes to Fashion School (O'live TV, 2009)
- She's O'live - Choi Jung-won in Melbourne (O'live TV, 2008)

=== Music video appearances ===
- SeeYa – "Shoes" (2006)
- SeeYa – "Hollyhock"
- Kim Jang-hoon – "Are You Happy?" (2005)

== Awards and nominations ==
Year	Award	Category	Nominated work	Result
2003	SBS Drama Awards	New Star Award	All In	Won
2006	KBS Drama Awards	Excellence Award, Actress	Famous Princesses	Won
2006	KBS Drama Awards	Popularity Award, Actress	Famous Princesses	Won
2006	KBS Drama Awards	Best Couple Award with Go Joo-won	Famous Princesses	Nominated
2007	3rd Andre Kim Best Star Awards	Female Star Award	—N/a	Won
2008	KBS Drama Awards	Excellence Award, Actress in a Miniseries	The Kingdom of the Winds	Won
2008	KBS Drama Awards	Netizen Award, Actress	The Kingdom of the Winds	Nominated
2008	KBS Drama Awards	Best Couple Award with Song Il-gook	The Kingdom of the Winds	Won
2008	KBS Drama Awards	Best Couple Award with Park Gun-hyung	The Kingdom of the Winds	Nominated
2009	43rd Tax Payer's Day	Prime Minister's commendation	—N/a	Won
2009	17th Chunsa Film Art Awards	Hallyu Culture Award	—N/a	Won
2010	SBS Drama Awards	Top Excellence Award, Actress in a Special Planning Drama	Stars Falling from the Sky	Nominated
2011	KBS Drama Awards	Excellence Award, Actress in a Miniseries	Brain	Nominated
2011	KBS Drama Awards	Netizen Award, Actress	Brain	Won
2011	KBS Drama Awards	Best Couple Award with Shin Ha-kyun	Brain	Won
2013	2nd Asian Idol Awards	Best Foreign Artist	—N/a	Won
2016	SBS Drama Awards	Excellence Award, Actress in a Serial Drama	Witch's Castle	Nominated
