= Stars Falling from the Sky =

South Korean television series

- Promotional poster
- Also known as: Wish Upon a Star; Pick Up the Stars
- Hangul: 별을 따다줘
- RR: Byeoreul ttadajwo
- MR: Pyŏrŭl ttadajwŏ
- Genre: Romance; Family; Drama
- Written by: Jung Ji-woo
- Directed by: Jung Hyo; Oh Jin-suk
- Starring: Choi Jung-won; Kim Ji-hoon
- Country of origin: South Korea
- Original language: Korean
- No. of episodes: 20

Production
- Production location: Korea
- Running time: 70 minutes Mondays and Tuesdays at 21:55 (KST)
- Production companies: Shinyoung E&C Group

Original release
- Network: Seoul Broadcasting System
- Release: 4 January – 16 March 2010

Stars Falling From the Sky (Korean: 별을 따다줘; RR: Byeoreul ttadajwo; also known as Wish Upon a Star) is a 2010 South Korean television drama broadcast on SBS.

== Plot ==
Jin Pal-gang (Choi Jung-won) has worked at an insurance firm for five years, but she spends more than she makes and has racked up credit card debt. Loud-mouthed and rash, she has a pretty immature personality despite her 25 years of age and her life's greatest goal is to find a handsome, perfect man and live in married bliss. But she suddenly becomes the guardian for her five younger adopted siblings when her parents pass away.

Won Kang-ha (Kim Ji-hoon) is Pal-gang's co-worker and romantic interest, a sharp insurance company lawyer who was abandoned as a child and has trouble opening up to others - until he meets Pal-gang and her siblings.

== Cast ==
Jin family

- Choi Jung-won as Jin Pal-gang
- Park Ji-bin as Jin Joo-hwang
- Kim Yoo-ri as Jin No-rang
- Joo Ji-won as Jin Cho-rok
- Chun Bo-geun as Jin Pa-rang
- Lee Young-bum as Jin Sae-yoon
- Yu Ji-in as Na Joo-soon

Won family

- Kim Ji-hoon as Won Kang-ha
- Shin Dong-wook as Won Joon-ha
- Lee Kyun as Woo Tae-gyu

Jung family

- Chae Young-in as Jung Jae-young
- Lee Soon-jae as Jung Gook
- Kim Kyu-chul as Jung In-goo
- Jung Ae-ri as Lee Min-kyung

Extended cast

- Lee Doo-il as Kim Jang-soo
- Park Hyun-sook as Han Jin-joo
- Kim Ji-young as Choi Eun-mal
- Jang Jung-hee as Pal-gang's office supervisor
- Joo Ho as grocery lady's son
- Seo Young as Min-ah
- Na Hae-ri as secretary
- Jo Won-suk
- Min Ji-oh
- Jun Jin-gi

== Trivia ==
The Jin siblings are named after colors in the Korean language.

- ppal-gang = red
- joo-hwang = orange
- no-rang = yellow
- cho-rok = green
- pa-rang = blue
- nam-i = indigo

== Soundtrack ==
Stars Falling from the Sky

Soundtrack album by Various Artists
- Released: January 25, 2010
- Genre: K-pop
- Label: Chili Music/M.net

Singles from Stars Falling from the Sky
- 1. "Stars Falling from the Sky" Released: January 12, 2010

Stars Falling from the Sky is the soundtrack album for the television series. It was released on January 25, 2010 by Chili Music, distributed by M.net. The title song, "Stars Falling from the Sky," was released as a digital single on January 12, 2010. That song is performed by the South Korean girl group Kara.

=== Track listing ===
No.	Title	Length
1.	"Stars Falling from the Sky"	3:25
2.	"Do You (그대니까)"
3.	"Maybe... (아마도...)"
4.	"Tears of the street (눈물의 거리)"	4:27
5.	"I Am a Mother"
6.	"Once Again"
7.	"Find Hope (희망을 찾아서)"
8.	"I Miss the Family (그리운 가족)"
9.	"Singing Star (별의 노래)"
10.	"Wound (사랑의 상처)"
11.	"The Truth Is False (거짓된 진실)"
12.	"Rainbow Neighborhood (무지개 동네)"
13.	"Ride Sinbulja (달려라 신불자)"
14.	"Rainbow Neighborhood (무지개 동네)"
15.	"Tears of Pain (아픔의 눈물)"
16.	"I Am a Mother (String Ver.)"
17.	"Warm-hearted"
18.	"Drunk (술에 취해)"
19.	"View of Afternoon (Part 2) (오후풍경)"
20.	"Magic"
21.	"Lullaby"
