= Brain (TV series) =

2011 South Korean medical drama

- Promotional poster for Brain
- Genre: Medical drama Romance
- Created by: Kwak Ki-won; KBS Drama Division
- Written by: Yoon Kyung-ah
- Directed by: Yoo Hyun-ki; Song Hyun-wook
- Starring: Shin Ha-kyun; Choi Jung-won; Jung Jin-young; Jo Dong-hyuk
- Composers: Park Seung-jin; Choi Min-chang
- Country of origin: South Korea
- Original language: Korean
- No. of episodes: 20

Production
- Executive producer: Lee Geun-jun (KBS)
- Producer: Moon Jun-ha (KBS)
- Production location: South Korea
- Running time: 60 minutes on Mondays and Tuesdays at 21:55 (KST)
- Production company: CJ E&M

Original release
- Network: KBS
- Release: 14 November 2011 – 17 January 2012

Brain (Korean: 브레인) is a 2011 South Korean medical drama, starring Shin Ha-kyun, Choi Jung-won, Jung Jin-young and Jo Dong-hyuk. The series revolves around a top neurosurgeon who is obsessed with success and dreams of becoming the hospital director, then finds himself embroiled in professional rivalries and an unexpected romance. The series received positive reviews, particularly for Shin Ha-kyun's performance.

It aired on KBS2 from November 14, 2011 to January 17, 2012 on Mondays and Tuesdays at 21:55 for 20 episodes.

== Plot ==
Lee Kang-hoon (Shin Ha-kyun) is a neurosurgeon in his early 30s. He graduated from Korea's most prestigious medical school with the best grades and completed his residency. Ashamed of his poor, uneducated parents, he has sworn since he was young that he will change his own fate. He chose neurosurgery, the least popular department, because there he can easily gain privileges by making connections with senior doctors. Seo Joon-suk (Jo Dong-hyuk), who was born with everything, is the person Kang-hoon despises the most and views him as his rival. Kim Sang-chul (Jung Jin-young) is a caring, empathetic neurosurgeon professor in his mid-50s who acts as a mentor to Yoon Ji-hye (Choi Jung-won). Joon-suk likes Ji-hye, but she has feelings for Kang-hoon. The series takes a shocking turn when Kang-hoon learns that Sang-chul caused his father's death.

== Cast ==
=== Main characters ===
- Shin Ha-kyun as Lee Kang-hoon

Main protagonist of the series. An arrogant neurosurgeon who lives with his mother and sister, he is haunted by the death of his father when he was a child. At first he does not like Ji-hye, but grows to have feelings for her.

- Choi Jung-won as Yoon Ji-hye

A doctor who comes from a middle-class family. She is very fond of Kim Sang-chul, whom she considers her mentor. She starts to fall for Kang-hoon.

- Jung Jin-young as Kim Sang-chul

Head of the hospital who cares for his patients. He has a dark past involving the accidental death of Kang-hoon's father on the surgery table, with young Kang-hoon as a witness.

- Jo Dong-hyuk as Seo Joon-suk

A doctor who comes from rich family whose maid happened to be Kang-hoon's mother. He has a crush on Ji-hye.

- Claudia Kim as Jang Yoo-jin

The daughter of a rich man whom Kang-hoon saved. Now she is trying to seduce Kang-hoon. Yoo-jin has a 5-year-old daughter.

=== Supporting characters ===
- Lee Sung-min - Go Jae-hak
- Ban Hyo-jung - Hwang Young-sun
- Park Chul-ho - Park In-bum
- Im Ji-eun - Hong Eun-sook
- Jo Soo-min - Im Hyun-jung
- Kwak Seung-nam - Yang Bum-joon
- Shim Hyung-tak - Jo Dae-shik
- Kwon Yul - Yeo Bong-goo
- Song Ok-sook - Kim Soon-im, Kang-hoon's mother
- Kim Ga-eun - Lee Ha-young, Kang-hoon's sister
- Kang Ye-seo - Choi Ryu-bi
- Lee Seung-joo - Dong Seung-man
- Choi Il-hwa - Ahn Dong-suk
- Heo Jung-gyu - Kong Duk-ki
- Hong Il-kwon - Hwang Tae-sung
- Ko In-beom - Jang Yoo-jin's father
- Lee Hyun-woo - Park Dong-hwa (guest appearance)
- Yoo Chae-yeong - Swimming instructor (guest appearance)
- Marco - Man at swimming pool (guest appearance)
- Lee Chan-ho - Na Jae-woong (guest appearance)
- Jeon Moo-song - Kim Shin-woo (guest appearance)
- Kim Young-ok - Sa Bong-ja (guest appearance)
- Hwang Bum-sik - Cha Hoon-kyung (guest appearance)

== Production ==
Lee Sang-yoon, Yoon Seung-ah, and Lee Hyun-jin were originally cast as the main characters (Lee Kang-hoon, Yoon Ji-hye and Seo Joon-suk, respectively), but after the read-through, the producers deemed them "too young" for their roles and the actors were subsequently fired. Song Seung-heon and Kim Joo-hyuk were rumored to be offered the leading role, which eventually went to Shin Ha-kyun.

== Awards and nominations ==
Year	Award	Category	Recipient	Result
2011	KBS Drama Awards	Best Couple Award	Shin Ha-kyun and Choi Jung-won	Won
2011	KBS Drama Awards	Netizen Award	Shin Ha-kyun	Won
2011	KBS Drama Awards	Netizen Award	Choi Jung-won	Won
2011	KBS Drama Awards	Excellence Award, Actor in a Miniseries	Jung Jin-young	Won
2011	KBS Drama Awards	Excellence Award, Actor in a Miniseries	Shin Ha-kyun	Nominated
2011	KBS Drama Awards	Excellence Award, Actress in a Miniseries	Choi Jung-won	Nominated
2011	KBS Drama Awards	Top Excellence Award, Actor	Shin Ha-kyun	Nominated
2011	KBS Drama Awards	Grand Prize (Daesang)	Shin Ha-kyun	Won
2012	Korean PD Awards	Best Actor	Shin Ha-kyun	Won
2012	Baeksang Arts Awards	Best TV Actor	Shin Ha-kyun	Nominated
2012	Baeksang Arts Awards	Best TV Drama	Brain	Nominated
2012	Seoul International Drama Awards	Best Actor	Shin Ha-kyun	Nominated
2012	K-Drama Star Awards	Top Excellence Award, Actor	Shin Ha-kyun	Nominated
