= Norifusa Mita =

Japanese manga artist (born 1958)

Norifusa Mita 三田 紀房
- Born: January 4, 1958 (age 68) Kitakami, Iwate, Japan
- Area: Manga artist
- Notable works: Dragon Zakura, Kurokan
- Awards: 25th Kodansha Manga Award (2005)

Norifusa Mita (Japanese: 三田 紀房, Hepburn: Mita Norifusa; born January 4, 1958) is a Japanese manga artist. He is best known for Dragon Zakura for which he received the 29th Kodansha Manga Award. Dragon Zakura has been adapted to live-action television series in Japan and South Korea, its spin-off series Angel Bank received live-action television adaptation as well. His manga Investor Z was adapted into live-action television series in 2018 and The Great War of Archimedes was adapted into a film in 2019.

== Works ==
- Eiji's Tailor (Big Comic Original Zōkan, Shogakukan)
- Shinpan Monogatari Verdict (審判物語バーディクト, Shinpan Monogatari Bādikuto) (Manga Goraku Next, Nihon Bungeisha)
- Kū o Kiru (空を斬る) (Monthly Afternoon, Kodansha)
- Boys of Summer (Big Comic Spirits, Shogakukan)
- Polo Shirt and Upper Cut (ポロシャツとアッパーカット, Poro Shatsu to Appā Katto) (Weekly Playboy, Shueisha)
- Kurokan (クロカン) (Weekly Manga Goraku, Nihon Bungeisha)
- Scout Seishirō (スカウト誠四郎, Sukauto Seishirō) (Evening, Kodansha)
- Kōshien e Ikō (甲子園へ行こう!) (Weekly Young Magazine, Kodansha)
- Dragon Zakura (ドラゴン桜, Doragon Zakura) (Weekly Morning, Kodansha)
  - Angel Bank: Dragon Zakura Gaiden (エンゼルバンク-ドラゴン桜外伝-, Enzerubanku -Doragon Zakura Gaiden-) (Weekly Morning, Kodansha)
- Money no Ken (マネーの拳, Manē no Ken) (Big Comic Superior, Shogakukan)
- Gin no Anchor (銀のアンカー, Gin no Ankā) (Super Jump, Shueisha)
- Kaze to Green no Kyōshitsu (風とグリーンの教室, Kaze to Gurīn no Kyōshitsu) (Weekly Per Golf, Gakken)
- Tōmei Axle (透明アクセル, Tōmei Akuseru) (Evening, Kodansha)
- Suna no Eikan (砂の栄冠) (Weekly Young Magazine, Kodansha)
- Investor Z (インベスターZ, Inbesutā Z) (Weekly Morning, Kodansha)
- The Great War of Archimedes (アルキメデスの大戦, Arukimedesu no Taisen) (Weekly Young Magazine, Kodansha)
- Dr. Eggs (ドクターエッグス, Dokutā Eggusu) (Grand Jump, Shueisha) {ongoing}
