= Dragon Zakura =

Japanese manga series

- First tankōbon volume cover, featuring Kenji Sakuragi

ドラゴン桜 (Doragon Zakura)
- Genre: School drama
- Manga
- Written by: Norifusa Mita
- Published by: Kodansha
- Imprint: Morning KC
- Magazine: Morning
- Original run: July 3, 2003 – June 28, 2007
- Volumes: 21
- Manga

Angel Bank: Dragon Zakura Gaiden
- Written by: Norifusa Mita
- Published by: Kodansha
- Imprint: Morning KC
- Magazine: Morning
- Original run: October 11, 2007 – June 10, 2010
- Volumes: 14
- Manga

Dragon Zakura 2
- Written by: Norifusa Mita
- Published by: Kodansha
- Imprint: Morning KC
- Magazine: Morning
- Original run: January 25, 2018 – March 18, 2021
- Volumes: 17
- Live-action dramas
- Dragon Zakura (2005); Master of Study (2010)
- icon

Dragon Zakura (Japanese: ドラゴン桜, Hepburn: Doragon Zakura; lit. 'Dragon Cherry Blossom') is a Japanese manga series written and illustrated by Norifusa Mita. Serialized in Kodansha's seinen manga magazine Morning from July 2003 to June 2007, its chapters were compiled into 21 tankōbon volumes between October 2003 and August 2007. It was adapted into a live-action television series of the same name, broadcast on TBS in 2005.

A sequel manga titled Angel Bank: Dragon Zakura Gaiden was published in Morning between October 2007 and June 2010, and compiled into 14 tankōbon volumes. Another sequel manga titled Dragon Zakura 2 was serialized in Morning from January 2018 to March 2021, and compiled into 17 tankōbon volumes.

== Plot ==
This is a story about a private high school (Ryuzan) in which lawyer Kenji Sakuragi, a former biker, is sent to close down. His business is on the rocks due to his biker background being made public in a scandal-magazine. Sakuragi gets the idea of turning the school around instead of closing it, thereby resurrecting his career. He goes for an outrageous goal: getting 5 students from this no-hope high school into Tokyo University, the top university in the country. He persuades the director to back him, then gives a rousing speech to the entire school to announce the special class. "You're all losers and you'll stay losers for the rest of your lives! Because you're too lazy to use your brains and you haven't figured out that society is run by clever folks who make sure they always win and you always lose. If you don't like that prospect, study! I'll give you a goal: get into Tokyo University!" he shouts to a stunned, silent crowd.

When none of the existing teachers have the backbone to take on the responsibility for this class, Sakuragi decides to run the class himself. To help him, he obtains the assistance of a motley crew of unorthodox teachers to teach math, language arts, social studies, and English. Using a combination of tough love and unusual scientific methods, he goads, bribes, and cajoles 2 students into joining the class. He is assisted but also opposed by a couple of young English teachers, one of whom hates him and is always suspicious of his motives and methods. Will Sakuragi succeed or will the cynicism of just about everyone else win out? And just how does Sakuragi know so much about how to get into Tokyo University, anyway?

In addition to offering many scientific methods for studying for tests generally and preparing for Tokyo University, in particular, the series includes many interesting insights and points of view about human psychology.

== Media ==
=== Manga ===
Written and illustrated by Norifusa Mita, Dragon Zakura was serialized in Kodansha's Morning magazine from July 3, 2003, in that year's 31st issue, to June 28, 2007, in that year's 30th issue. Kodansha compiled its chapters in 21 tankōbon volumes, published between October 22, 2003, and August 23, 2007.

A sequel manga, titled Angel Bank: Dragon Zakura Gaiden (エンゼルバンク-ドラゴン桜外伝-, Enzerubanku -Doragon Zakura Gaiden-), was published in Morning on October 11, 2007, in that year's 45th issue, and ending on June 10, 2010, in that year's 28th issue. Its chapters were compiled in 14 tankōbon volumes, published between January 23, 2008, and August 23, 2010.

Another sequel manga, titled Dragon Zakura 2 (ドラゴン桜2), was serialized in Morning from January 25, 2018, in that year's eighth issue, to March 18, 2021, in that year's sixteenth issue. Its chapters were compiled in 17 tankōbon volumes, published between March 23, 2018, and June 23, 2021.

=== Live-action TV adaptations ===
The manga has been adapted into a Japanese television drama series of the same name and also into a 2010 South Korean television drama series titled Master of Study. It was also adapted into a Chinese internet television drama series, released in December 2023 as The Hope.

On March 10, 2020, it was announced that a live action series based on the series' sequel will air on TBS, with the story set 10 years after the previous series. Actor Hiroshi Abe reprised his role as Kenji Sakuragi from the previous live-action adaptations. It was originally slated for Q3 2020, but was delayed due to the COVID-19 pandemic. It later premiered in April 2021.

== Reception ==
The manga has sold over 6 million copies, and won the 2005 Kodansha Manga Award for general manga. It also won an Excellence Prize at the 2005 Japan Media Arts Festival, with the jury saying, "The theme is not new, the composition is somewhat orthodox and it is true that there was criticism of the drawing skill. However, the story is told with such great conviction and pathos that these weaknesses are easily overlooked. It is a very entertaining manga, which is probably the most important thing."
