= List of South Korean films of 2015 =

This is a list of South Korean films that received a domestic theatrical release in 2015.

== Box office ==
The highest-grossing South Korean films released in 2015, by domestic box office gross revenue, are as follows:

Highest-grossing films released in 2015
Rank	Title	Distributor	Domestic gross
1	Veteran	CJ Entertainment	$85,504,761
2	Assassination	Showbox	$80,055,712
3	The Himalayas	CJ Entertainment	$48,923,059
4	Inside Men	Showbox	$46,020,483
5	The Throne	Showbox	$39,712,232
6	Northern Limit Line	Next Entertainment World	$37,046,956
7	The Priests	CJ Entertainment	$34,482,075
8	Detective K: Secret of the Lost Island	Showbox	$24,761,691
9	Twenty	Next Entertainment World	$19,157,484
10	The Classified File	Showbox	$18,202,875

== Released ==
Released	English title	Korean title	Director	Cast	Ref.
1 January	The Second Mother	두 번째 엄마	Lee Min-hwan	Yoon Seol-hee, Lee Yo-seong	
8 January	Casa Amor: Exclusive for Ladies	워킹걸	Jung Bum-shik	Jo Yeo-jeong, Clara	
8 January	Snow in Sea Breeze	설해	Kim Jung-kwon	Park Hae-jin, Lee Young-ah	
14 January	Love Forecast	오늘의 연애	Park Jin-pyo	Lee Seung-gi, Moon Chae-won	
15 January	The Cat Funeral	고양이 장례식	Lee Jong-hoon	Kangin, Park Se-young	
15 January	Chronicle of a Blood Merchant	허삼관	Ha Jung-woo	Ha Jung-woo, Ha Ji-won	
15 January	Ghost Over Flowers	꽃보다처녀귀신	Choi Young-min	Ahn Jae-min, Maeng Seung-ji	
15 January	Mira Story	미라클 여행기	Heo Chul		
21 January	Gangnam Blues	강남 1970	Yoo Ha	Lee Min-ho, Kim Rae-won	
22 January	Clearer Than You Think	생각보다 맑은	Han Ji-won	Um Sang-hyun, Yang Jeong-hwa	
28 January	Shoot Me in the Heart	내 심장을 쏴라	Mun Che-yong	Lee Min-ki, Yeo Jin-goo	
29 January	Bitch Heart Asshole	비치하트애솔	Inan	Kwon Hyun-sang, Park Ran	
29 January	Hot Service: A Cruel Hairdresser	화끈한 써비스: 어느 잔인한 미용사의	Nam Ki-woong	Lee Eon-jeong, Lee Won-jong	
29 January	Lost Flower: Eo-u-dong	주인없는 꽃: 어우동	Lee Soo-sung	Baek Do-bin, Song Eun-chae, Yeo Wook-hwan	
5 February	The Basement Satellite	망원동 인공위성	Kim Hyoung-ju		
5 February	C'est Si Bon	쎄시봉	Kim Hyun-seok	Jung Woo, Han Hyo-joo	
5 February	The Strong & Mini Special Forces: The Attack of a New Villain	최강전사 미니특공대: 새로운 악당의 습격	Lee Young-joon	Um Sang-hyun, Jeon Tae-yeol	
11 February	Detective K: Secret of the Lost Island	조선명탐정: 사라진 놉의 딸	Kim Sok-yun	Kim Myung-min, Oh Dal-su, Lee Yeon-hee	
12 February	Five Senses of Love	사랑오감	Han Cheol-soo	Ryu Seung-ryong, Kim Gyu-ri, Hwanhee	
12 February	A Matter of Interpretation	꿈보다 해몽	Lee Kwang-kuk	Yoo Jun-sang, Shin Dong-mi, Kim Kang-hyun	
25 February	Boarding House	하숙집	Kyeong Seok-ho	Kwon Gi-ha, Jang Ha-ram	
26 February	The Avian Kind	조류인간	Shin Yeon-shick	Kim Jeong-seok, So-yi	
26 February	Gi-Hwa	기화	Moon Jeong-yun	Hong Hee-yong, Baek Seung-chul, Kim Hyun-jun	
26 February	The Maidroid	친절한 가정부	No Zin-soo	Young Geon, Yeon Song-ha	
5 March	Barracks	살인캠프	Lee Sang-bin	Baek Do-bin, Jung Si-ah	
5 March	Dog Eat Dog	개: dog eat dog	Hwang Wook, Park Min-woo	Kim Seon-bin, Kwak Min-ho	
5 March	Empire of Lust	순수의 시대	Ahn Sang-hoon	Shin Ha-kyun, Jang Hyuk	
5 March	Granny's Got Talent	헬머니	Shin Han-sol	Kim Soo-mi, Jung Man-sik, Kim Jung-tae	
12 March	B-E-D	베드	Park Chul-soo	Jang Hyuk-jin, Lee Min-a, Kim Na-mi	
12 March	The Deal	살인의뢰	Son Yong-ho	Kim Sang-kyung, Park Sung-woong	
12 March	Socialphobia	소셜포비아	Hong Seok-jae	Byun Yo-han, Lee Joo-seung	
12 March	Watchtower	망대	Moon Seung-wook		
19 March	Heartbreak Hotel	태양을 쏴라	Kim Tai-sik	Kang Ji-hwan, Yoon Jin-seo	
19 March	Mongolian Princess	몽골리안 프린세스	Danwoo Jung	Danwoo Jung, Elisabeth Garcia, Park Ha-na	
19 March	Strangers on the Field	그라운드의 이방인	Kim Myeong-joon	Kwon Hae-hyo (narrator)	
25 March	Twenty	스물	Lee Byeong-heon	Kim Woo-bin, Lee Junho, Kang Ha-neul	
26 March	He Who Loves the World	그 사람 그 사랑 그 세상	Kwon Hyeok-man	Kang Seok-woo, Lee Kwang-gi, Choi Kang-hee (narrators)	
26 March	I Like Sexy Women 3	나는 야한 여자가 좋다 3	Kim Mi-yeon	Kang Pil-seon, Son Ga-ram	
26 March	The Trip Around the World	세계일주	Yi Hang-pae	Kim Jung-tae, Park Ha-young, Koo Seung-hyun	
2 April	Delicious Delivery	맛있는 택배	Gi Dae-ho	Song Gi-joon, Son Ga-ram, Lee Ye-eun	
2 April	Foulball	파울볼	Cho Jung-rae	Kim Sung-keun, Cho Jin-woong (narrator)	
9 April	Fukushima: Is There a Way Out?	후쿠시마의 미래	Lee Hong-ki	Kim Mi-hwa (narrator)	
9 April	Revivre	화장	Im Kwon-taek	Ahn Sung-ki, Kim Gyu-ri	
9 April	Salut d'Amour	장수상회	Kang Je-gyu	Park Geun-hyung, Youn Yuh-jung	
16 April	The Black Hand	검은손	Park Jae-sik	Han Go-eun, Kim Sung-soo	
20 April	Nineteen: Shh! No Imagining!	나인틴: 쉿! 상상금지!	No Zin-soo	Choi Won-joon, Han Se-yi	
23 April	Clown of a Salesman	약장수	Jo Chi-un	Kim In-kwon, Park Chul-min	
23 April	Glittering Hands	반짝이는 박수 소리	Lee-Kil Bo-ra	Lee Sang-guk, Kil Kyung-hee, Lee-Kil Bo-ra	
23 April	Maze: Secret Love	미궁: 비밀애	Hideo Jojo	Kang Ho, Hwang Ji-hoo, Aino Kishi, Akiho Yoshizawa	
29 April	Coin Locker Girl	차이나타운	Han Jun-hee	Kim Hye-soo, Kim Go-eun	
30 April	Dino Time	다이노 타임	Choi Yoon-suk, John Kafka	Pamela Adlon, Tara Strong	
30 April	Enemies In-Law	위험한 상견례 2	Kim Jin-young	Jin Se-yeon, Hong Jong-hyun	
30 April	Illusionary Paradise	부곡 하와이	Ha Kang-hun	Park Myung-shin, Ryu Hye-rin	
30 April	Planck Constant	플랑크 상수	David Cho	Kim Jae-wook, Jin Ah-reum, Kim Ji-yoo, Jung-won	
30 April	The Sisters' Room	자매의 방	Han Dong-ho	Song Eun-jin, Joo Yeon-seo, Jung Neom-chyeo	
30 April	Touch by Touch	터치 바이 터치	Kim Ho-joon	Ha Na-kyeong, Koo Ji-sung	
1 May	Black Stone	블랙스톤	Roh Gyeong-tae	Won Tae-hee, Kate Velarde, Erlinda Villalobos	
7 May	Incheon Waltz	어떤여행, 시민창작뮤지컬	Kim Jeong-wook	Choo Min-joo	
7 May	Love Clinic	연애의 맛	Aaron Kim	Oh Ji-ho, Kang Ye-won	
7 May	An Omnivorous Family's Dilemma	잡식가족의 딜레마	Hwang Yun		
7 May	Roaring Currents: The Road of the Admiral	명량: 장군의 길	Kim Han-min, Jung Se-kyo	Kim Han-min, Lee Hae-yeong, Ryohei Otani, Jang Jun-nyeong	
7 May	Young Mother: What's Wrong With My Age?	젊은 엄마: 내 나이가 어때서	Kim Il-jong	Myung Gye-nam, Chae Min-seo, Hong Seo-joon	
14 May	The Chronicles of Evil	악의 연대기	Beak Woon-hak (or Baek Woon-hak)	Son Hyun-joo, Ma Dong-seok	
14 May	The Disobeying Teacher	명령불복종 교사	Seo Dong-il		
21 May	Alive	산다	Park Jung-bum	Park Jung-bum, Lee Seung-yeon	
21 May	Makgeolli Girls	막걸스	Kim Ki-young	Hong Ah-reum, Changjo	
21 May	The Treacherous	간신	Min Kyu-dong	Ju Ji-hoon, Kim Kang-woo	
27 May	The Shameless	무뢰한	Oh Seung-uk	Jeon Do-yeon, Kim Nam-gil	
28 May	Coin Locker	코인라커	Kim Tae-kyung	Son Yeo-eun, Lee Yeong-hoon	
28 May	Seven Princess Driver	7공주 대리운전	Lee Jae-hoon	Kwak Jin-young, Cha Young-ok	
4 June	Crown Princess Hong	혜경궁 홍씨	Jang Dong-hong	Kim So-hee, Yoon Yeo-seong, Jung Tae-hwa	
4 June	My Fair Wedding	마이 페어 웨딩	Jang Hee-sun	Kim Jho Gwangsoo, David Kim Seung-hwan	
4 June	The Outsider: Mean Streets	따라지: 하류인생	Shin Dong-yeob	Go Se-won, Jo Min-se	
4 June	Perfect Proposal	은밀한 유혹	Yoon Jae-gu	Im Soo-jung, Yoo Yeon-seok	
11 June	Lover	애인	Lee Soong-hwan	Moon Joo-yeon, Choi Sang-joon	
11 June	A Midsummer's Fantasia	한여름의 판타지아	Jang Kun-jae	Kim Sae-byuk, Ryo Iwase	
11 June	Outing	외출	Gi Dae-ho	Jung Seo-yoon, Jeon Hyun-soo	
18 June	Angry Painter	성난 화가	Jeon Kyu-hwan	Yoo Jun-sang, Moon Jong-won	
18 June	The Classified File	극비수사	Kwak Kyung-taek	Kim Yoon-seok, Yoo Hae-jin	
18 June	The Silenced	경성학교: 사라진 소녀들	Lee Hae-young	Park Bo-young, Uhm Ji-won	
24 June	Northern Limit Line	N.L.L. - 연평해전	Kim Hak-soon	Kim Mu-yeol, Jin Goo, Lee Hyun-woo	
25 June	All About My Father	욕정이 활활	Lee Sang-woo, Kim Hun, Hwang Hee-kyung		
25 June	Intimate Enemies	나의 절친 악당들	Im Sang-soo	Ryoo Seung-bum, Go Joon-hee	
25 June	Looking for My Family	어떤 가족	Kim Hyeong-beom	Choi Won-young, Ryu Hye-won, Kang San	
25 June	Made in China	메이드 인 차이나	Kim Dong-hoo	Park Ki-woong, Han Chae-ah	
25 June	Minority Opinion	소수의견	Kim Sung-je	Yoon Kye-sang, Yoo Hae-jin, Kim Ok-bin	
2 July	Director's Cut	디렉터스 컷	Park Joon-bum	Park Jung-pyo, Han Song-hee	
2 July	Madonna	마돈나	Shin Su-won	Seo Young-hee, Kwon So-hyun	
9 July	Kwon Bob: Chinatown	권법형사: 차이나타운	Park Sang-hyun	Seo Jun-young, Ban So-yeong, Won Jin	
9 July	Pascha	파스카	Ahn Sun-kyoung	Kim So-hee, Sung Ho-joon	
9 July	The Piper	손님	Kim Gwang-tae	Ryu Seung-ryong, Lee Sung-min	
9 July	Red Tomb	레드 툼	Gu Ja-hywan		
9 July	School Riot	학교반란	Sung Dong-yoon	Lee Hyuk, Kim Seung-jin	
11 July	Gay Out Soon 4: RUMOR	게이봉박두4: RUMOR	Beom, Go Soo-mi, Hong Il, Jeong Mal-ro	Kim Seon-hyeok, Jo Yoon-ho ("OPEN"); Yoon Tae-woo ("FMSM"); Choi Hee-yoon, Lee Sang-hyun ("Tea Time"); Kim Seon-ik, Yoo Song-yi ("Cohabitation")	
15 July	Three Summer Nights	쓰리 썸머 나잇	Kim Sang-jin	Kim Dong-wook, Im Won-hee, Son Ho-jun	
16 July	12 Deep Red Nights: Chapter 1	십이야: 깊고 붉은 열두 개의 밤 Chapter 1	Oh In-chun	Lee Kwang-hoon, Jung Bo-reum	
16 July	Miryang Arirang: Legend of Miryang 2	밀양 아리랑	Park Bae-il		
16 July	Polaroid	폴라로이드	Joo Ho-sung	Jeong Jae-yeon, Kim Tae-yong, Yang Fan	
16 July	The Wicked Are Alive	악인은 살아 있다	Kim Harry	Park Byung-eun, Han Soo-yeon	
18 July	Queer Movie Butterfly: The Adult World	퀴어영화 나비: 어른들의 일	Baek In-gyu	Yoo Seung-won, Yoo Dong-hyun	
22 July	12 Deep Red Nights	십이야: 깊고 붉은 열두 개의 밤 Chapter 1	Oh In-chun	Lee Kwang-hoon, Jung Bo-reum, Park Eun-seok, Bae Young-ran	
22 July	Assassination	암살	Choi Dong-hoon	Jun Ji-hyun, Lee Jung-jae, Ha Jung-woo	
23 July	AV Idol 2	AV 아이돌 2	Hideo Jojo	Nana Nanaumi, Jang Dae-yoon	
30 July	Gifted	살인재능	Juhn Jai-hong	Kim Beom-joon, Bae Jung-hwa	
30 July	Tasty 2: Happy Together	고녀석 맛나겠다2: 함께라서 행복해	Choi Kyeong-seok, Kazumi Nonaka	Um Sang-hyun, Si Yeong-jun	
5 August	Death in Desert	짓2: 붉은 낙타	No Zin-soo	Ko One, Kim Min-ki	
5 August	Purpose of Reunion	동창회의 목적	Jung Dae-man	Jo In-woo, Kim Yoo-yeon	
5 August	Veteran	베테랑	Ryoo Seung-wan	Hwang Jung-min, Yoo Ah-in	
8 August	Scary House	무서운 집	Yang Byung-gan	Goo Yoon-hee, Yang Byung-gan	
13 August	Alice in Earnestland	성실한 나라의 앨리스	Ahn Gooc-jin	Lee Jung-hyun, Lee Hae-young	
13 August	Amor	그리울 련	Han Cheol-soo	Jung Kyung-ho, Jung Yoon-sun, Mina Fujii	
13 August	Factory Complex	위로공단	Im Heung-soon		
13 August	The Last Comfort Woman	마지막 위안부	Lim Seon	Moon Si-ho, Kim Mi-young	
13 August	The Martyrdom	순교	Kim Sang-cheol		
13 August	Memories of the Sword	협녀, 칼의 기억	Park Heung-sik	Lee Byung-hun, Jeon Do-yeon, Kim Go-eun	
13 August	SMTOWN The Stage	에스엠타운 더 스테이지	Bae Sung-sang	SM Entertainment stars	
13 August	Wonderful Nightmare	미쓰 와이프	Kang Hyo-jin	Uhm Jung-hwa, Song Seung-heon	
14 August	Madam	마님	Kim Gwang-joong	Kim Jung-ah, Kim Ji-hoon	
20 August	The Beauty Inside	뷰티 인사이드	Baik (Baek Jong-yul)	Han Hyo-joo	
20 August	The Chosen: Forbidden Cave	퇴마: 무녀굴	Kim Hwi	Kim Sung-kyun, Yoo Sun	
20 August	Confession	고백	Jung Young-bae	Kim Young-ho, Yoon In-jo	
20 August	Now Playing	오늘 영화	Gang Gyeong-tae, Yi Ok-seop, Yoon Seong-ho, Koo Kyo-hwan	Jung Yeon-ju, Park Jong-hwan, Park Min-ji	
27 August	Speed	스피드	Lee Sang-woo	Seo Jun-young, Baek Sung-hyun	
27 August	Untouchable Lawmen	치외법권	Shin Dong-yeob	Im Chang-jung, Choi Daniel	
2 September	Taste 2	맛2	Kyeong Seok-ho	Go Eun-sung, Kim Soo-jung	
3 September	Mission, Steal the Top Star	미션, 톱스타를 훔쳐라	No Byeong-ha	Oh Chang-seok, Kim Joo-ri	
3 September	Office	오피스	Hong Won-chan	Go Ah-sung, Park Sung-woong, Bae Sung-woo	
3 September	The Piano	기적의 피아노	Lim Seong-gu	Park Yoo-chun (narrator)	
3 September	Taboo: Forbidden Love	타부: 금지된 사랑	Ko Goo-ma	Park Se-mi, Wi Ji-woong	
3 September	Young Mother 3	젊은 엄마3	Chae Gil-byung	Kim Jung-ah, Kim Ha-rae	
10 September	The Crimson Whale	화산고래	Park Hye-mi		
10 September	Deep Trap	함정	Kwon Hyung-jin	Ma Dong-seok, Jo Han-sun	
10 September	Joseon Scandal - The Seven Valid Causes for Divorce	조선안방 스캔들-칠거지악	Lee Soong-hwan	Eun Min, Esther	
10 September	Love Never Fails	사랑이 이긴다	Min Byung-hun	Choi Jung-won, Jang Hyun-sung	
10 September	My Sister, the Pig Lady	돼지 같은 여자	Jang Moon-il	Hwang Jung-eum, Lee Jong-hyuk	
10 September	The Night of the Prophet	선지자의 밤	Kim Sung-moo	Lee Mi-so, Kim Young-pil	
10 September	On the White Planet	창백한 얼굴들	Hur Bum-wook	Hong Beom-gi, Jo Min-soo	
10 September	Self-Referential Traverse: Zeitgeist and Engagement	은밀한 방문자	Kim Sun	Podoli, Kang Seok	
10 September	Shadow Island	영도	Son Seung-ung	Tae In-ho, Lee Sang-hee	
10 September	Super Racer Enzy	슈퍼레이서 엔지	Heo Seon		
10 September	Young Lady	젊은 처제	Lee Se-jong	Kwak Han-gu, Ko One	
16 September	Secret Visitor	은밀한 방문자	Yoon Yeo-chang	Park Jae-hoon, Kwak Ji-eun	
16 September	The Throne	사도	Lee Joon-ik	Song Kang-ho, Yoo Ah-in	
17 September	The Lingerie Murders	란제리 살인사건	Kim Se-seong	Kwon Min-joong, Won Ki-joon	
17 September	Sunshine Love	션샤인 러브	Jo Eun-sung	Oh Jung-se, Jo Eun-ji	
17 September	Trap	덫, 치명적인 유혹	Bong Man-dae	Yoo Ha-joon, Han Je-in	
24 September	The Accidental Detective	탐정: 더 비기닝	Kim Joung-hoon	Kwon Sang-woo, Sung Dong-il	
24 September	The Long Way Home	서부전선	Cheon Sung-il	Sul Kyung-gu, Yeo Jin-goo	
24 September	Obscene Family	음란한 가족	Sheen Jeong-kyun	Han Soo-ah, Han Ga-rim	
24 September	Right Now, Wrong Then	지금은맞고그때는틀리다	Hong Sang-soo	Jung Jae-young, Kim Min-hee	
8 October	The Advocate: A Missing Body	성난 변호사	Heo Jong-ho	Lee Sun-kyun, Kim Go-eun	
22 October	Collective Invention	돌연변이	Kwon Oh-kwang	Lee Kwang-soo, Park Bo-young, Lee Chun-hee	
22 October	Speed	스피드	Lee Sang-woo	Seo Jun-young, Baek Sung-hyun, Choi Tae-hwan, Byun Jun-suk	
5 November	The Priests	검은 사제들	Jang Jae-hyun	Kim Yoon-seok, Kang Dong-won	
19 November	Inside Men	내부자들	Woo Min-ho	Lee Byung-hun, Cho Seung-woo	
25 November	You Call It Passion	열정 같은 소리 하고 있네	Jeong Gi-hun	Park Bo-young, Jung Jae-young	
30 December	The Magician	조선마술사	Kim Dae-seung	Yoo Seung-ho, Go Ara, Kwak Do-won	
31 December	Dear Dictator	친애하는 지도자동지께	Lee Sang-woo	Kim Yeong-geon, Shin Won-ho, Seo Hyun-seok	
