= Futari Ecchi =

Japanese manga series

- First tankōbon volume cover, featuring Yura Onoda

ふたりエッチ
- Genre: Romantic comedy; Sex comedy
- Manga
- Written by: Katsu Aki
- Published by: Hakusensha
- English publisher: NA: Tokyopop
- Magazine: Young Animal; Young Animal Arashi (Note: Extra chapters only)
- Original run: December 1996 – present
- Volumes: 95
Further information
Television drama
Directed by	Gen Yamakawa
Original network	Wowow
Original run	2000
Episodes	3
Original video animation
Directed by	Hiroshi Ishiodori; Yuji Moriyama
Written by	Chiaki J. Konaka
Music by	Jun Watanabe
Studio	Chaos Project
Licensed by	NA: AnimeWorks
Released	July 26, 2002 – January 22, 2004
Runtime	28 minutes
Episodes	4
Manga
Futari Ecchi For Ladies
Written by	Katsu Aki
Published by	Hakusensha
Magazine	Silky
Original run	December 2002 – October 2004
Volumes	2
Live-action film
Directed by	Kazuhiro Yokoyama
Written by	Juri Sanemura
Music by	Kentaro Nojima
Released	June 18, 2011
Runtime	74 minutes
Live-action film
Futari Ecchi: Second Kiss
Directed by	Kazuhiro Yokoyama
Written by	Juri Sanemura
Music by	Kentaro Nojima
Released	December 17, 2011
Runtime	70 minutes
Live-action film
Futari Ecchi: Triple Love
Directed by	Kazuhiro Yokoyama
Written by	Kazuhiro Yokoyama
Music by	Kentaro Nojima
Released	May 12, 2012
Runtime	74 minutes
Live-action film
Futari Ecchi: Love Forever
Directed by	Kazuhiro Yokoyama
Written by	Kazuhiro Yokoyama
Music by	Kentaro Nojima
Released	May 12, 2012
Runtime	70 minutes
Original video animation
Directed by	Tetsurō Amino
Studio	Production Reed
Released	October 10, 2014
Runtime	27 minutes
Episodes	3
Manga
Futari Ecchi Gaiden: Akira, The Evangelist of Sex
Written by	Monkey Chop
Published by	Hakusensha
Magazine	Young Animal
Original run	June 23, 2017 – November 24, 2017
Volumes	1
- icon

Futari Ecchi (Japanese: ふたりエッチ, Hepburn: Futari Etchi) is a Japanese manga series written and illustrated by Katsu Aki. It has been serialized in Hakusensha's seinen manga magazine Young Animal since December 1996, with its chapters collected in 95 tankōbon volumes as of June 2026. The series follows a newlywed couple in their mid-twenties, both virgins when they married, and chronicles their sexual explorations. The manga combines erotic elements with factual and informative statistics. Its title Futari Ecchi ("two person ecchi") is a play on a slang term for masturbation, hitori ecchi ("single person ecchi").

Two spin-off manga have been released, Futari Ecchi for Ladies focusing on the sexuality of women and Futari Ecchi Gaiden: Akira, The Evangelist of Sex focusing on Akira. There are also two sex manuals and an art book. The series was adapted into a three episode live-action television drama that aired on WOWOW in 2000. A four-volume original video animation (OVA) series was produced from 2002 and 2004. In 2011, a twelve-episode live-action web series was streamed on Ustream. Also in 2011, a live-action theatrical film series began. Four films have been released. A second three episode OVA series was released in 2014 by Production Reed.

In 2007, the manga series was licensed in North America by Tokyopop as Manga Sutra, only four volumes were released, comprising eight Japanese volumes. Also in 2007, Media Blasters licensed and released the OVAs on DVD as Step Up Love Story.

The series had 29.5 million copies in print by February 2018 and is most famous for being a how-to guide combined with a story.

== Characters ==
Makoto Onoda (小野田 真, Onoda Makoto)
The series' protagonist, a 25-year-old foreign cosmetics maker and elite salaryman. He was introduced to Yura through an omiai. He is very critical of his own sexual abilities, but that does not hinder him from having sexual fantasies with any pretty girl in his vicinity (ultimately, though, he stays faithful to Yura). Nevertheless, after his marriage he attracts the attention of a lot of female admirers. In addition to his inexperience, Makoto suffers from premature ejaculation.
He is voiced by Mitsuo Iwata (radio drama) and Yūji Ueda (2002 OVA), Yuichi Nakamura (2014 OVA) and portrayed by Sō Yamanaka (TV series), Shinnosuke Fukushima (web series), Riki Miura (1st film) and Hikaru Okada (2nd film).
Yura Onoda (小野田 優良, Onoda Yūra)
Makoto's wife. Also 25 years old. Makoto is the first man she has ever kissed or had sex with. She is loving, but extremely naïve on sexual matters and too shy to try something new by herself (even through the series she is fully determined to overcome her limitations and be a better lover to Makoto), as well as insecure about her looks; she is unaware how beautiful and charming she is. She is also the target of attention by many men (although their behavior is – compared to the women who adore her husband – mostly passive longing). She additionally has the knack of befriending most of the women whom she should consider her rivals for Makoto's affections (Makoto's colleague Makie Sugiyama is a notable exception). Yura is also a big fan of undead-themed horror movies. When she was in high school, she was a member of the Tennis club.
She is voiced by Yumi Ichihara (radio drama) and Tomoko Kawakami (2002 OVA), Ayumi Tsunematsu (2014 OVA) and portrayed by Chika Inada (TV series), Nana Nanaumi (web series) and Yūri Morishita (films).
Rika Kawada (河田 梨香, Kawada Rika)
Yura's 20-year-old sister. Sexually experienced and rather promiscuous (to the point where, early in the series, she keeps a boyfriend and three "sex friends" – in addition to miscellaneous flings), she constantly teases and goads both Makoto and Yura into improving their "night life". At first in an on-and-off relationship with her "number-one boyfriend", Taku Yamada, for most of the series, she eventually decides to settle down, even marrying the son of Makoto's boss Katori, though their matrimony rapidly disintegrates soon afterwards following personal differences.
She is voiced by Fumie Kusachi (radio drama) and Naoko Takano (2002 OVA), Chiwa Saitō (2014 OVA) and portrayed by Ayaka Tomoda (web series) and Miyuki Yokoyama (films).
Akira Onoda (小野田 明, Onoda Akira)
Makoto's older brother. A 29-year-old lawyer. He is very nosy and frequently pesters Makoto about his sex life and fancies himself as Makoto's tutor on the topic of pleasuring the wife. In order to appease his own sex drive, he frequently visits brothels.
He is portrayed by Yuichi Tsuchiya (3rd film).
Jun Onoda (小野田 淳, Onoda Jun)
Makoto's 17-year-old sister. Initially she has a rather romantic look on a relationship, and her quest for true love lets her drift through a number of affairs before she finally finds happiness with her first boyfriend, Yosuke.
She is portrayed by Natsumi Kamata (web series) and Kirara Asuka (2nd film).
Sanae Onoda (小野田 早苗, Onoda Sanae)
Makoto's sister-in-law and Akira's 27-year-old wife. She is annoyed at Akira's habit of patronizing brothels.
She is portrayed by Sasa Handa (web series) and Rika Kawamura (3rd film).
Mamoru Onoda (小野田 守, Onoda Mamoru)
Makoto's father. A 52-year-old company officer. He is overly sensitive about his sex life, and far too protective of his youngest child, Jun.
He is portrayed by Bengaru (3rd film).
Akiko Onoda (小野田 明子, Onoda Akiko)
Makoto's mother. A 54-year-old housewife. Akiko proves to be more liberal (and encouraging) than her husband is when it comes to the topic of her sex life.
She is portrayed by Motoko Sasaki (3rd film).
Hideki Kawada (河田 秀樹, Kawada Hideki)
Yura's father. A 49-year-old camera operator. He has a liking for cats and dogs, and raises a large number of them. He is also a fan of the Hanshin Tigers. While not as active as his daughters, he still enjoys a fulfilling sexual relationship with his wife Chiharu.
He is voiced by Ken Mizukoshi (2014 OVA).
Chiharu Kawada (河田 千春, Kawada Chiharu)
Yura's mother. A 47-year-old with a youthful appearance and a tender personality. Like her husband, she is a cat/dog aficionado. She frequently suffers from lumbago.
She is voiced by Aina Yasukuni (2014 OVA).
Kyoko Omiya (大宮 杏子, Ōmiya Kyōko)
Makoto's second cousin and an obstetrician and gynecologist. At the request of Makoto's mother, she moved in next door to the Onodas to encourage them to reproduce. A very dominant personality, she was still a virgin at age thirty, but she finally does get settled down with Koichiro Matsuzaki.
She is portrayed by Momoko Tani (3rd film).
Taku Yamada (山田 拓, Yamada Taku)
Rika's "number-one boyfriend", who is a rather self-centered sexist. And just like Rika, he is not very concerned about having more than one relationship, although he does react jealously when he finds her involved with other men. Eventually, however, Rika dumps him, settles down, divorces and rekindles their relationship.
He is voiced by Kappei Yamaguchi (2002 OVA) and portrayed by Yukio (web series).
Yosuke Inoue (井上 洋助, Inoue Yōsuke)
Jun's first and current boyfriend; also her former classmate and now fellow student. Jun had her first time with him, but due to their then differing views of a relationship they broke apart for a couple of years before finding each other again. They have since moved together and are exploring (and deepening) their feelings for each other.
He is portrayed by Rakuto Tochihara (web series).

== Media ==
=== Manga ===
Written and illustrated by Katsu Aki, Futari Ecchi has been serialized biweekly in Hakusensha's seinen manga magazine Young Animal since December 1996. Its chapters have been collected by Hakusensha into individual tankōbon volumes, with the first one released on August 29, 1997. As of June 29, 2026, 95 volumes have been released. In December 2002, a side story called Futari Ecchi for Ladies (ふたりエッチ for Ladies) began serialization in Silky, running for twelve chapters until its conclusion in October 2004. It focuses on the women in the series. The individual chapters were collected and published into two tankōbon volumes by Hakusensha. Another side story titled Futari Ecchi Gaiden: Akira, The Evangelist of Sex (ふたりエッチ外伝 性の伝道師アキラ) began in Young Animal on June 23, 2017 and ended on November 24, 2017. It commemorates the series' 20th anniversary and is written by Monkey Chop and supervised by Katsu. It was compiled into one volume. There are also two sex manuals and an art book, entitled Yura Yura.

Tokyopop licensed Futari Ecchi for an English-language release in North America under the name Manga Sutra - Futari H in 2007, with two volumes of the original Japanese release combined into a single volume. However, before the release of the first volume, which was published in January 2008, several major retailers had announced they would not carry the title due to its content. A representative of Tokyopop also said that the volumes were expensive to produce. They planned to release the first ten Japanese tankōbon in five volumes, but only four were released, the fourth published in January 2009. Tokyopop ceased all manga publications in 2011.

=== Radio drama ===
From January 5 to March 30, 1997, a radio drama was broadcast on Nippon Cultural Broadcasting. The roughly 30 minute program aired on Tuesdays at 1:00am and was later released on two CDs, by Bandai Music, as Futari Ecchi: The CD Show (ふたりエッチ THE CD SHOW).

=== Original video animations ===
Beginning in 2002, a four-volume original video animation series was produced by Chaos Project. It is split into two stages; the first two episodes, released on July 26 and September 7, 2002, make up one, and the last two, released on November 27, 2003 and January 22, 2004, make up the second.

On July 2, 2007, Media Blasters announced that they had licensed the OVA series at Anime Expo. They first released it as Step Up Love Story on two DVDs, each containing two episodes, on November 27, 2007 and January 29, 2008. On December 30, 2008 it was released in a box set, which was re-released on July 10, 2012 as part of their Anime Works Classic line.

Another three episode OVA, telling an original story, was released on October 10, 2014 by Production Reed.

=== Live-action ===
A three-part live-action mini-series adaptation of Futari Ecchi aired on the pay-per-view channel Wowow in 2000. They were titled (STEP1「オトコの気持ち♂勇者になりたい」), (STEP2「オンナの気持ち♀感じてみたい」) and (STEP3「二人の気持ち いざハネムーン!」), and all directed by Gen Yamakawa.

In May 2011, it was announced that Futari Ecchi would be receiving both a live-action film adaptation and a live-action web series. The web series was streamed on Ustream and stars Nana Nanaumi and Shinnosuke Fukushima as Yura and Makoto with Takaso Kase as Akira Onoda and Sasa Handa as Sanae Onoda. It premiered in July 2011 and had fifteen 12-minute episodes created. The entire series was released in DVD and Blu-ray box sets on September 16, 2011, with three additional episodes and a bonus DVD with a making-of feature.

The film stars Yuuri Morishita and Riki Miura as Yura and Makoto, was directed by Kazuhiro Yokoyama and written by Juri Sanemura. The first film was released on June 18, 2011 and received a DVD release on September 2. At an event for the DVD release, a sequel called Futari H: Second Kiss (ふたりエッチ セカンド♥キッス) was announced to begin filming in October. Hikaru Okada replaces Miura as Makoto in the sequel, which hit theaters on December 17, 2011. Just like previously, a third film was announced at the second's DVD release party. The third and fourth films, titled Futari Ecchi: Triple Love (ふたりエッチ トリプル♥ラブ) and Futari Ecchi: Love Forever (ふたりエッチ ラブ♥フォーエバー) were both released on May 12, 2012. They were released on DVD on June 15 and August 3 respectively.

In 2019 Futari Ecchi: Love Again (映画版 ふたりエッチ 〜ラブ・アゲイン〜) and Futari Ecchi: Double Love (映画版 ふたりエッチ 〜ダブル・ラブ〜) have been released.

== Reception ==
The Futari Ecchi manga has 29.5 million collected volumes in print by February 2018; 27 million in Japan, including digital copies, and 2.5 million overseas.
