= I Am Trash =

- Directed by: Lee Sang-woo
- Screenplay by: Lee Sang-woo
- Produced by: Pierce Conran
- Starring: Kwan Bum-tack; Lee Sang-woo; Yang Myoung-hoen; Park Hyung-bin
- Cinematography: Kim Min-su
- Edited by: Lee Sang-woo; Lee Chae-hyun
- Music by: Kang Min-kook
- Release dates: September 2014 (Fantastic Fest); May 12, 2016 (South Korea)
- Running time: 97 minutes
- Country: South Korea
- Language: Korean

I Am Trash (Korean: 나는 쓰레기다; RR: Naneun sseuregida) is a 2014 South Korean drama film written and directed by South Korean indie provocateur Lee Sang-woo. The third and final instalment of Lee's thematic "bad family" trilogy comprising Mother Is a Whore (2011) and Father Is a Dog (2012), it follows three grown up brothers reuniting with their pedophile father after his release from prison. It made its world premiere in the Fantastic Features section at the 10th Fantastic Fest in 2014.

== Synopsis ==
After their father (Kwan Bum-tack) was sent off to prison for sexually assaulting an underaged girl, Sang-woo (Lee Sang-woo) and his two brothers Sang-tae (Yang Myoung-hoen) and Sang-goo (Park Hyung-bin) struggle to live a normal life. Now, the three emotionally damaged brothers must deal with the aftermath of their father returning home after his release from prison.

== Cast ==
- Kwan Bum-tack as Father
- Lee Sang-woo as Sang-woo
- Yang Myoung-hoen as Sang-tae
- Park Hyung-bin as Sang-goo
- Jo Yong-seok
- Yoo So-hyeon
