= Ebisu Muscats =

J-pop musical group

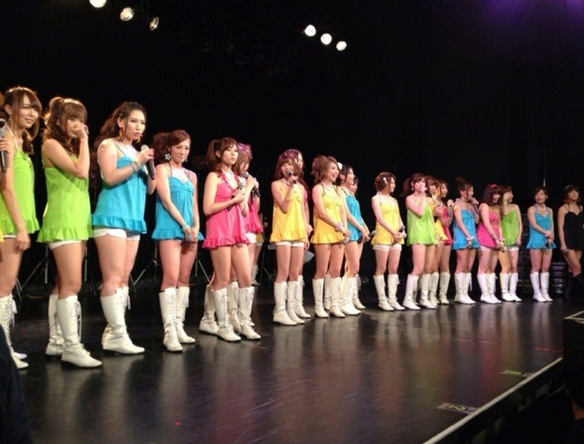
- Ebisu Muscats in Osaka, 2013.

Background information
- Origin: Japan
- Genres: J-pop
- Years active: 2008 – 2013
- Label: Pony Canyon

Ebisu Muscats (恵比寿マスカッツ, Ebisu Masukattsu) is the name of a series of J-pop groups mainly consisting of Japanese gravure idols and AV idols, under the Pony Canyon record label. The original group was established in 2008 as part of the TV Tokyo's variety show Onegai! Muscat (おねがい マスカット) which first aired in April 2008. Their first single, released in 2010, reached number 8 in sales on Oricon’s singles chart. They held their first live show in July 2010 in Shibuya, Tokyo.

The group did not have a permanent roster but members were rotated in and out. By mid-2012 there were 29 active members and 45 had retired. At that time the group was led by AV Idol Yuma Asami who had been with the group from the start. The group disbanded and held its last concert on April 7, 2013 after a farewell tour. Longtime member Yuma Asami participated in the final concert despite having recently had major surgery.

A successor group named "Ebisu★Muscats" was formed in September 2015, but the name was changed to Ebisu Muscats 1.5 in October 2017.

== Ebisu Muscats (2008–2013) ==
=== Members ===
Final lineup:

- Aino Kishi - 3rd Leader of Ebisu Muscats
- Yuma Asami - 2nd Leader of Ebisu Muscats
- Akiho Yoshizawa
- Rio (Tina Yuzuki)
- Sora Aoi - 1st Leader of Ebisu Muscats
- Shou Nishino
- Minori Hatsune
- Jessica Kizaki
- Aika Ando
- Asami Ogawa
- Rin Sakuragi
- Rina Rukawa
- Kaho Kasumi
- Ayako Yamanaka
- Nanako Kodama
- Ena Kawamura
- Manami Yamaguchi
- Airi Nagasaku
- Haruka Ogura
- Ai Sayama
- Mui Kuriyama
- Yuria Satomi
- Saemi Shinohara
- Yui
- Yuri Oshikawa
- Hana Haruna
- Anna Anjo
- Rika Kawamura
- Rion Sakamoto
- Airi Kijima

Former members:

- Ano Aruru
- Ami
- Hina Kurumi
- Momoka Sugihara
- Kei Megumi
- Lemon Mizutama
- Moka
- Emiru Momose
- Saki Kataoka
- Yuko Shouji
- Kaho Natsumi
- Momoko Nishizono
- Natsuki Wakasugi
- Shiori Tsukimi
- Kozue Sakurai
- Rei Toda
- Yurisa
- Erika Kirihara
- Mio Kirino
- Nozomi Agawa
- Tsubasa Amami
- Akie Harada
- An Mashiro
- Kotomi Nagisa
- Miina Minamoto
- Sayoko Ohashi
- Mao Ichijō
- Kaera Uehara
- Haruna Orii
- Risa Kasumi
- Erika Kirihara
- Riri Kuribayashi
- Konan
- Eri Ouka
- Shoko Shibata
- Maki Sonoda
- Yumi Nagase
- Yuria Hayashida
- Natsuki Fukunishi / Ririka
- Akane Fujisaki
- Miyu Misaki
- Uruha Mizuki
- Mihiro
- Makoto Yuki
- Miyuki Yokoyama
- Maria Ozawa

=== Discography ===
==== Singles ====
- 2010 – Banana ・ Mango ・ Highschool / 12 no 34 de Naite (with Namidayon Shimai) (バナナ・マンゴー・ハイスクール/12の34で泣いて) JP #8
- 2010 – OECURA MAMBO / Watashi Manbō (OECURA MAMBO/私マンボー) JP #14
- 2010 – Chiyocolate / Kawaii Kōshien (チヨコレイト/かわいい甲子園) JP #17
- 2011 – Spring Holiday / Kuchigenka Shinai de ♪ (スプリングホリデー／口ゲンカしないで♪) JP #28
- 2011 – Ropponpon☆Fantasy (ロッポンポン☆ファンタジー) JP #8
- 2012 – Honey to Rap ♪ (ハニーとラップ♪) JP #13
- 2012 – Oyafukō Baby (親不孝ベイベー) JP #8
- 2012 – Gyakusoū♡Idol (逆走♡アイドル) JP #7
- 2013 – Abayo (ABAYO) JP #22

==== Album ====
- 2011 – The Muscats ~ Hollywood kara kon'nichiwa ~ (ザ・マスカッツ～ハリウッドからこんにちは～) JP #17
- 2013 – Sotsugyō Album (卒業アルバム) JP #8

== Ebisu Muscats 2 (formerly Ebisu★Muscats) (2015–2022) ==
Ebisu Muscats 2
- Origin: Japan
- Genres: J-pop
- Years active: 2015 – 2022
- Label: Pony Canyon

=== Members ===
Final lineup:

- Masami Ichikawa (5th Leader of Ebisu Muscats)
- Mai Ishioka
- Miharu Usa
- Sae Kanzaki
- Nanami Kawakami
- Mirei Kurosawa
- Sina Tatsumi
- Rin Matsuoka
- Akino Fujiwara
- Yua Mikami
- Kana Momonogi
- Yuki Yoshizawa
- Mihiro
- Maity / Mai Kasuya
- Saya Kisaragi
- Hiromi Kobayashi
- Moko Sakura
- Yuka Shirafuji
- Natsuki
- Ayumi Nara
- Yun Matsumoto
- Nanako Miyamura
- Airi Kijima
- Aika Yamagishi
- Yuuri Fukada
- Noa Eikawa
- Riona Hirose

Former members :

- Anri Okita
- Shunka Ayami
- Ai Uehara
- Nami Hoshino
- Aika Usui
- Rika Usui
- Aya Nagase
- Moe Amatsuka
- Nana Ayano
- Rirei
- Yura Sakura
- An Tsujimoto
- Rui Hasegawa
- Tia
- Kirara Asuka (4th-5th Leader of Ebisu Muscats)
- Tsukasa Aoi
- Minami Kojima
- Shiori Kamisaki
- Iori Kogawa
- Su-bu
- Misaki Tamori
- Hanami Natsume
- Riku Minato
- Hanon Hinana
- Marina Shiraishi
- Mayumi Yamanaka
- Tina Nanami
- Ui Mita
- Mary Fujii
- Yura Kano
- Ayaka Tomoda
- Kana Yume

PTA members :

- Sora Aoi
- Yuma Asami
- Rio (Tina Yuzuki)

=== Discography ===
==== Singles ====
- 2015 – "TOKYO Sexy Night" (TOKYOセクシーナイト)
- 2016 – "Sexy Beach Honeymoon"
- 2019 – "EBISU ANIMAL ANTHEM"
- 2019 – "Majogarita"
- 2020 – "Digital Noise"
- 2022 – "Seven Colors Story" (七色ストーリー)
- 2023 - "Night in Tokyo"

==== Album ====
- 2017 – Kidoairaku (喜怒愛楽)
- 2020 – Mini Muscats
- 2022 – 10th ANNIVERSARY
