= Konan (singer) =

Japanese singer

Konan (KONAN)
- Born: 4 March 1985 (age 40); Osaka Prefecture, Japan
- Other names: Yumi Konan (former stage name); Konyan (nickname)
- Occupations: Gravure idol; television personality; singer; race queen
- Years active: 2001–
- Known for: Former SDN48 member
- Modeling information
- Height: 162 cm (5 ft 4 in) (2007)
- Agency: One Eight Promotion

Konan (stylised as KONAN; born 4 March 1985) is a Japanese singer, tarento, and gravure idol. She is a former member of the female idol group SDN48 and is nicknamed Konyan (こにゃん).

Born in Ikuno-ku, Osaka, she is the youngest of three sisters. She is represented by One Eight Promotion. Konan was also a member of the former idol dance unit Soul Tiger and previously worked as a race queen. Her former stage name was Yumi Konan (虎南 有美, Konan Yumi).

== Biography ==
From 2001 to 2002, she was the lead vocalist of the four-member dance unit Soul Tiger, which originated from the television program Batoraku (Kansai Telecasting Corporation). The other members were Yumika Yoshii, Yuko Ishida, and Yuka Konan.

At the time, Yuka Konan's stage name closely resembled hers, so the program introduced Yuka as "Yumi Konan's cousin." However, this was solely for entertainment purposes, and their supposed familial relationship was never mentioned again after the program ended.

She graduated from the program Choito Muscat and its unit, Ebisu Muscats, on the broadcast aired on 7 July 2010. Unlike the usual fade-out departures of most members, a formal graduation ceremony was held during the show. During the ceremony, her own comments were shared, along with a "letter" from fellow Muscats member Rio.

On 10 July, three days after the broadcast, she made a surprise appearance at Ebisu Muscats First Concert Ebisu Muscats Satsujin Jiken – Utatte Odotte Korosa rete and officially announced her graduation from the group in front of fans.

She received a 7up! award at the National Schoolgirl High School Uniform Collection 2001, sponsored by Shueisha. She participated alongside Erika Sawajiri, Nao Nagasawa, and others.

In 2005, she transferred to One Eight Promotion.

In the same year, she joined the Super GT Mach Queens alongside Haruna Amatsubo, Tomoe Takeuchi, and Yuki Yanai.

Also in the same year, she joined the women's entertainer futsal team Nanzaku YJ Shooters (now South Games Shooters) and competed in the Sphere League. She wore the number 10 jersey and played as a pivo (FW) or ara (MF), known for her sharp plays from the right side.

In 2006, she served as the Super GT Houzan's Cosmos Circuit Lady.

In 2007, she became a member of the gravure idol unit Venus alongside Yumi Ando, Ami Tsubaki, and Airi Nagasaku.

That same year, she was selected by representatives from Jinro, Mandom, and Weekly Playboy (Shueisha) at ABC Venus Battle 2007 – Famous Company Image Girl Selection Meeting (Asahi Broadcasting Corporation). She was then appointed to represent Weekly Playboy in its promotional activities.

In 2008, she became a regular cast member on the TV Tokyo variety show Onegai! Muscat and a regular performer with the Ebisu Muscats.

She joined SDN48 as a second-generation member on 15 May 2010. Along with this, she graduated from Ebisu Muscats on Choito Muscat!.

On 9 September 2010, the TV Asahi program Suppon no Onna-tachi announced the twelve selected members chosen to sing SDN48's debut songs. She ranked fourth in the final selection, making her the top-ranking second-generation member.

She graduated from SDN48 during the SDN48 concert "Next Encore" at NHK Hall on 31 March 2012.

== Personal life ==
Konan's qualifications include Kanji kentei Level 2 and a 7 in ink brushing penmanship. There are various opinions on the origins of her name, but she herself explained that it comes from adding "Ko" (虎, Tiger) from the Hanshin Tigers, which represents her hometown of Osaka, and "Nan" (南, South) because she was born in the southern part of Osaka Prefecture.

In Onegai! Muscat and Onedari!! Muscat, she had the catchphrase "One wolf in Naniwa." This became part of her character, which was portrayed as bullish, using a Kansai dialect, and being a Hanshin Tigers fan. In a segment of the same program, when Sola Aoi jokingly asked, "Is it good with a gorilla character?" the nickname "gorilla" was established both within the program and outside of it. However, Konan herself later stated, "I can't do a gorilla character because I am doing gravure."

Rika Kawamura, who co-starred with her in Onegai! Muscat and Onedari!! Muscat, is her best friend.

On 20 August 2023, she announced her marriage via Instagram.
