= World Aipoke Championship =

Professional wrestling championship

Details
- Promotion: DDT Pro-Wrestling
- Date established: April 2013
- Date retired: October 4, 2015
Statistics
- First champion: Hiroshi Fukuda
- Final champion: Super Sasadango Machine
- Longest reign: Super Sasadango Machine (504 days)
- Shortest reign: Hiroshi Fukuda (<1 day)

The World Aipoke Championship (Japanese: 世界アイポケ級王座, Hepburn: Sekai Aipoke-kyū Ōza) was a professional wrestling championship in the Japanese promotion Union Pro Wrestling (UPW) when it was a sub-brand of DDT Pro-Wrestling. The title was created in April 2013 by then UPW sponsor IdeaPocket. "Aipoke" is the abbreviated name of IdeaPocket (アイデアポケット, Aidea Poketto).

There have been a total of five reigns and one vacancy shared between five different champions. The title was deactivated in 2015 when UPW folded.

== Title history ==
Key
No.	Overall reign number
Reign	Reign number for the specific champion
Days	Number of days held
Defenses	Number of successful defenses
<1	Reign lasted less than a day

No.	Champion	Championship change			Reign statistics			Notes	Ref.
No.	Champion	Date	Event	Location	Reign	Days	Defenses	Notes	Ref.
1	Hiroshi Fukuda	May 3, 2013	Golden Union 2013	Tokyo, Japan	1	<1	0	Defeated Sanshiro Takagi, Jun Kasai and Fuma in a four-way match to win the inaugural title.	
2	Aino Kishi	May 3, 2013	Golden Union 2013	Tokyo, Japan	1	222	0	After having been presented the belt by Kishi, Hiroshi Fukuda asked for a kiss. Kishi slapped him in response and referee Kyohei Wada awarded her the title.	
—	Vacated	December 11, 2013	Shiwasu no Union 2013	Tokyo, Japan	—	—	—	Title vacated so a decision match could be held.	
3	Seiya Morohashi	December 11, 2013	Shiwasu no Union 2013	Tokyo, Japan	1	62	0	Defeated Mitomi Masayuki, Madoka and Mio Shirai in a four-way match to win the vacant title.	
4	Ryu Gouma	February 11, 2014	Demon Union 2014	Yokohama, Japan	1	96	0	This was a quiz match.	
5	Super Sasadango Machine	May 18, 2014	Golden Union 2014	Tokyo, Japan	1	504	0	This was a No Disqualification Only "Say Yes" Deathmatch.	
—	Deactivated	October 4, 2015	—	—	—	—	—	Championship deactivated when Union Pro folded.	

== See also ==
- DDT Pro-Wrestling
- Professional wrestling in Japan
