= Father Is a Dog =

- Film poster
- Hangul: 아버지는 개다
- RR: Abeojineun gaeda
- MR: Abŏjinŭn kaeda
- Directed by: Lee Sang-woo
- Screenplay by: Lee Sang-woo
- Produced by: Lee Sang-woo; Heo Sang-rye
- Starring: Kwan Bum-tack; Lee Tae-rim; Lee Si-ho; Kim Hun
- Cinematography: Song Jin-yeol
- Edited by: Lee Sang-woo
- Music by: Kim Mi-seung; Kang Min-kook
- Release dates: October 2010 (BIFF); April 26, 2012 (South Korea)
- Running time: 94 minutes
- Country: South Korea
- Language: Korean

Father Is a Dog (Korean: 아버지는 개다; RR: Abeojineun gaeda) is a 2010 South Korean drama film written and directed by South Korean indie provocateur Lee Sang-woo. The second instalment of Lee's thematic "bad family" trilogy, the first being Mother Is a Whore (2009), it describes the relationship of a father and his unknown sons. It world premiered at the 15th Busan International Film Festival in 2010.

== Cast ==
- Kwan Bum-tack as Father
- Lee Tae-rim as Gwang-soo
- Lee Si-ho as Gwang-heon
- Kim Hun as Gwang-yeol
- Yoo Ae-kyung as Crazy woman
