= Rei Toda =

Japanese gravure idol and actress (born 1987)

- 戸田 れい
- Born: 9 February 1987 (age 38); Tokyo, Japan
- Other names: Rachel
- Occupations: Gravure idol; tarento
- Spouse: Unknown (m. 2023)
- Modeling information
- Height: 161 cm (5 ft 3 in)
- Agency: R-I-P

Rei Toda (戸田 れい, Toda Rei, born 9 February 1987) is a Japanese gravure idol and actress who has appeared in a number of television programmes, stage productions, feature films and videos. Her main nickname is Rachel (レイチェル, Reicheru). She is represented with the agency R-I-P.

== Biography ==
In 2009, she won the semi-Grand Prix and Photogenic Award at "Miss Mobage Grand Prix '09". She served as image girl of Heiwa Corporation in 2013. In addition, she served as the 5th generation advertising ambassador of Sagami Original 002.

In April 2017, she published her first photo collection "Trente".

In September 2023, she announced that she was married to a general man.

== Filmography ==
=== Television ===
Dates	Title	Network	Notes	Ref.
	Idol Geinō-sha	BS-TBS		
	Digi Yatai	TBS		
	Yarisugi Koji	TX	Regular; 2nd Yarisugi Girl	
	Tenshi Ranman	MBS		
	Uchiage	CBC		
	Gravure Talk Audition	CX		
	Idol no Hoshi	Enta! 371		
	Gravure no Bishōjo	Mondo21		
	Pajama House	CTV	Regular	
6–8 Apr 2009	Onedari!! Mascot	TX	Regular	
	Jōshiki: Shirita Girl	EX	Regular second grader	
Aug 2009 –	Enta! Selection	SukaPā! Enta! 371	In-programme Rachel Report regular	
8, 15 Jul 2010	Marusummers	TBS		
	Soko Tsubo	MXTV	Regular	
9 Mar 2011	Ichihachi	MBS		
29 Jul 2011	Soko Usa	MXTV		
30 Jul 2011	Rank Ōkoku	TBS		
23 Sep 2011	Akiba-kei Idol Channel	BS11		
26 Mar, 23 Apr 2012	Strike TV	EX		
21 Jun 2012	Hashigoman	MXTV		
7 Jun 2014	Doki'! Marugoto Mizugi Onna-darake no Suiei Taikai	Fuji TV One		
16 Apr 2015	Sakurai Ariyoshi Abunai Yakai	TBS		
8 May 2016	Marco Polori! SP	KTV		
25 Apr 2017	360° Marumie VR Idol Suiei Taikai	CX		

=== Dramas ===
Title	Role	Network
Gal Circle	Numako	NTV
Damenzu Walker		EX
Shinukato Omotta		NTV

=== Radio ===
Dates	Title	Network
16 Apr 2011 – 14 Apr 2012	Madamada Gocha maze'!: Atsumare Yan Yan	MBS Radio

=== Direct-to-video ===
Date	Title	Role	Publisher	Notes
2010	Shinrei Shashin-bu	Lily Rukawa	Happinet	
2011	Senritsu Short Short: Kowabana: Osore: Hanashi Shisha no Shiteiseki		Toriko	
7 Dec 2011	Yasha Game		Attackers	
2 Jun 2012	Kekko Kamen			Starring Aino Kishi

=== Stage ===
Dates	Title	Location
28–31 Jan 2010	Gutsugutsu	Theater Bratz
16–20 Mar 2011	Hyōryū Geki	Aqua Studio
24–28 Aug 2011	Season –Meguriai–	Sasazuka Factory
17, 19, 20 May 2012	Ningyohime	CBGK Shibukake!!
17, 19–21 Oct 2012	Yami no Kōtaishi	Ueno Storehouse
5, 7, 9, 10 Feb 2013	Bio-Hazard Cafe de Chōshoku o	Haiyuza Theater
20–24 Jan 2016	Gekidanta Kumi. outside performance Gakuya –Nagare Saru mono wa yagate natsukashiki–	Livestage hodgepodge

=== Advertisements ===
Dates	Product	Notes
Oct 2011	Takarakuji Loto 6	As a nurse
Nov 2012	Heiwa Corporation Golf Ba ni Aisareru	
Dec 2012	Heiwa Corporation Machi ga moshimo Othello ni nattara!?	

=== Films ===
Date	Title	Distributor
7 Sep 2013	Usotsuki Paradox	Vap
11 Oct 2014	Senkyoku Bloody Agent	

== Release works ==
=== DVD ===
Date	Title	Publisher
Mar 2005	Hissatsu Reiurudo	Edge
Sep 2005	Rei Toda	i-cf
Dec 2005	Sun Flower	Argonaut
24 Apr 2009	Selfish	Takeshobo
26 Aug 2009	Fresh!Eye	Fresh Media
20 Nov 2009	My Baby –Watashi to anata no–	E-Net Frontier
20 Feb 2010	Honey Days	Line Communications
26 Jun 2010	Sweet Trap	Shinyusha
22 Sep 2010	Gokujo	Toriko
22 Dec 2010	Rei Toda Swinuton	Toriko
3 Jun 2011	Ganbō Zukan	E-Net Frontier
19 Aug 2011	Setsuna no Koibito	Media Brand
21 Dec 2011	Yokubō no Taishō	E-Net Frontier
24 Aug 2012	Bijiri Reiku	E-Net Frontier
25 Feb 2013	Rachel	Air Control
31 May 2013	Fly –Let me be ur star–	Aqua House
20 Sep 2013	Bijiri Reiku II	E-Net Frontier
20 Dec 2013	E Shiri Yume Kibun	E-Net Frontier
25 Jun 2014	a beauty	E-Net Frontier
25 Nov 2014	Oshiri Collection	Air Control
20 Feb 2015	mis*dol	M.B.D Media Brand
25 Jul 2015	Reipan	Air Control
19 Nov 2015	Dotchi ni suru no	Guild
25 Sep 2016	Korekara mo.	Air Control
10 Jun 2017	Beau Trente	Wani Books
19 Oct 2017	Ikenai Hito	Guild

=== Photo albums ===
Date	Title	Publisher	Photographer	ISBN
20 Apr 2017	Trente	Wani Books	Yuichi Sato	ISBN 978-4847049163

== See also ==
- Tarento
- Gravure idol
