= Dirty Romance =

- Hangul: 더티 로맨스
- RR: Deoti romaenseu
- MR: Tŏt'i romaensŭ
- Directed by: Lee Sang-woo
- Screenplay by: Lee Sang-woo
- Produced by: Lee Jung-bae; Lee Hwa-yong; Choi Ji-won
- Starring: Kim Joon-woo; Ahn Ha-na; Gil Deok-ho; Choi Hong-jun
- Edited by: Lee Sang-woo; Kim Heon
- Music by: Kim Mi-seung
- Release dates: September 2015 (Fantastic Fest); January 5, 2017 (South Korea)
- Running time: 94 minutes
- Country: South Korea
- Language: Korean

Dirty Romance (Korean: 더티 로맨스) is a 2015 South Korean drama film written and directed by South Korean indie provocateur Lee Sang-woo. It made its world premiere at the 2015 Fantastic Fest.

== Synopsis ==
Goo Chul-joong (Kim Joon-woo) struggles to survive as he takes care of his severely disabled sister Goo Mi-joong (Ahn Ha-na). With no income and in debt, he begs his uncle for handouts and resorts to stealing. For a long time, Mi-joong has a crush on his friend Kim Chang-gi (Choi Hong-jun) who has yet to repay his debt. One day, Chul-joong coerces Chang-gi to have sex with Mi-joong as partial payment of his longstanding debt. Chul-joong also allows Gil Deok-ho (Gil Deok-ho), the mentally challenged son of a Chinese restaurant owner, to court his sister, hoping to marry her off and extricate himself from this living hell.

== Cast ==
- Kim Joon-woo as Goo Chul-joong
- Ahn Ha-na as Goo Mi-joong
- Gil Deok-ho as Gil Deok-ho
- Choi Hong-jun as Kim Chang-gi
- Kim Dong-kyu as Kim Deok-gi
- Kim Hyo-sook as Kim Chang-gi's mother
- Jo Ha-suk as Hae-soo's father
