= Samurai Princess =

- Movie poster featuring Aino Kishi
- Directed by: Kengo Kaji
- Screenplay by: Sōtarō Hayashi
- Produced by: Yoshihiro Nishimura
- Starring: Aino Kishi; Dai Mizuno
- Distributed by: CREi
- Release date: June 15, 2009
- Running time: 83 minutes
- Country: Japan
- Language: Japanese

Samurai Princess (サムライプリンセス 外道姫, Samurai purinsesu: Gedō hime) is a 2009 Japanese film directed by Kengo Kaji, described as ero guro action film. Special effects were produced by Yoshihiro Nishimura, who previously directed and created effects and makeup for Tokyo Gore Police, which Kengo Kaji wrote.

== Plot ==
Samurai Princess takes place sometime, somewhere in an alternate universe version of feudal Japan, where people live together with highly developed mechanical dolls called "Mechas". However, excessively developed mechanical dolls start causing harm to human society, leading to ghastly bloodshed happening all over the place. Under the circumstances, Kyoraku, a mad scientist, creates a female ninja mechanical doll. Equipped with eleven types of built-in weapons, the ninja doll is also infused with the souls of eleven of her fallen sisters. She uses their combined power to take down anyone who stands in her way. Virtually indestructible, the ninja is on a quest to save humanity.

== Cast ==
- Aino Kishi as Gedōhime (Samurai Princess)
- Dai Mizuno as Gekko
- Asuka Kataoka as Renjyo
- Mao Shiina as Mikaduki
- Miki Hirase as Mangetsu
- Sarasa Tani as Ruri
- Yū Aiba as Himawari
- Yukari Tateishi as Kogiku
- Rui Nanase as Koume
- Omu Taketomi as Samo
- Hiroyuki Kajima as Kujira
- Kentarō Shimazu as Shachi
- Mihiro as Kocho
- Mitsuru Karahashi as Kyoraku

== Release ==
On June 20, 2009 Samurai Princess appeared in the New York Asian Film Festival. The film was first released theatrically in Japan on July 25, 2009 and a Japanese DVD version of the film came out on October 23, 2009. A version of the DVD with English subtitles was released on November 17, 2009. A second and third sequel were announced as of the time of the time of the American DVD release.

== See also ==
- Cinema of Japan
