= Maze: Secret Love =

- Hangul: 미궁: 비밀애
- RR: Migung: bimirae
- MR: Migung: pimirae
- Directed by: Hideo Jojo
- Starring: Akiho Yoshizawa; Aino Kishi; Kim Min-gi; Lee Kyoo-bok; Hwang Ji-hoo
- Release date: 23 April 2015 (South Korea)
- Running time: 69 minutes
- Countries: South Korea; Japan

Maze: Secret Love (Korean: 미궁: 비밀애) is a 2015 erotic thriller film directed by Hideo Jojo.

== Cast ==
- Akiho Yoshizawa (吉沢明歩) as Ayaka (아야카)
- Aino Kishi (希志あいの) as Shiori (시오리)
- Kim Min-gi (김민기) as Min-joon (민준)
- Lee Kyoo-bok (이규복)
- Hwang Ji-hoo (황지후)
