= Jessica Kizaki =

Japanese former AV idol, actress, singer and gravure model

- 希崎ジェシカ
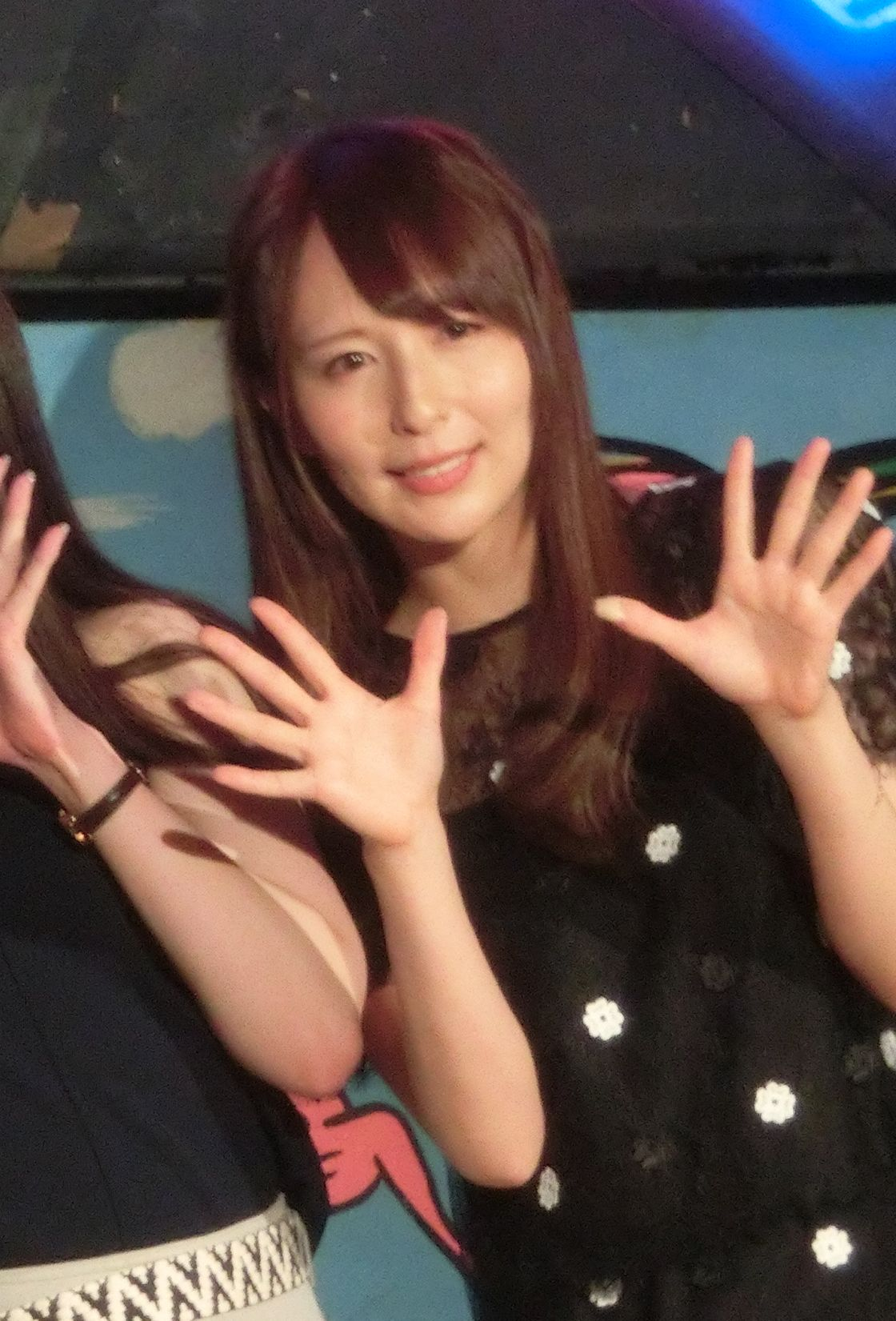
- Kizaki in 2018
- Born: June 10, 1989 (age 37); Tokyo, Japan
- Modeling information
- Hair color: Brown
- Eye color: Brown

Jessica Kizaki (Japanese: 希崎ジェシカ) (born 10 June 1989) is a Japanese former AV idol, actress, singer and gravure model. She was also a member of Ebisu Muscats.

== Life and career ==
Born in Tokyo, Kizaki made her debut in June 2008, appearing on the first image DVD Active high school student physical examination. In August 2008 she appeared in the gravure magazine Bejean. She made her AV debut with the video FIRST IMPRESSION 38 in September 2008, becoming an exclusive model for the company Idea Pocket. In December 2010 she released the book Ōrarusekkusu. In 2011 she won the Livedoor media award at the Adult Broadcasting Awards. In 2012, she took part in the music project Kiss, a J-pop group consisting of Kizaki, Mayu Nozomi and Aino Kishi. Their debut album was Touch My S.P.O.T..

For the majority of her AV career Kizaki worked exclusively with the company Idea Pocket appearing along with the studio's most famous performers like Kaho Kasumi, Aino Kishi, Alice Miyuki and Minori Hatsune. She had a short period at S1 No. 1 Style in late 2016 before transferring back to IdeaPocket in September, 2017. Her return film was LEGEND IMPRESSION where she starred along with fellow Idea Pocket actress and AV idol Amami Tsubasa. The film was also in competition in the 2017 AV Open Awards. Kizaki continued her AV career at Idea Pocket and Attackers, and starred in over 400 adult films throughout her career.

On June 10, 2019, Kizaki announced on her Twitter that she would retire from AV in December 2019. She explained: "Now that I gonna become 30 this year, I want to start a new chapter given that we only live once". She also thanked her fans for their longtime support. Kizaki's final adult film was released on December 13, 2019 titled Retirement -FINAL IMPRESSION- Last Final Passion 6 Production First 5 Hours 30 Minutes! Two-piece Super Masterpiece Special! (IPX-409), a two-disk film containing over five hours of footage. Her farewell event was held on December 22.

When the major Japanese adult video distributor DMM held a poll of its customers in 2012 to choose the 100 all-time best AV actresses to celebrate the 30th anniversary of adult videos in Japan, Kizaki was voted into 17th place.

== Movies ==
- Ushijima the Loan Shark (Yamikin Ushijima-kun, 2012)

== Drama Series ==
- Ushijima the Loan Shark (Yamikin Ushijima-kun, TBS-MBS, 2010/2014)
