= Iori Kogawa =

Japanese pornographic actress (born 1992)

- 古川 いおり
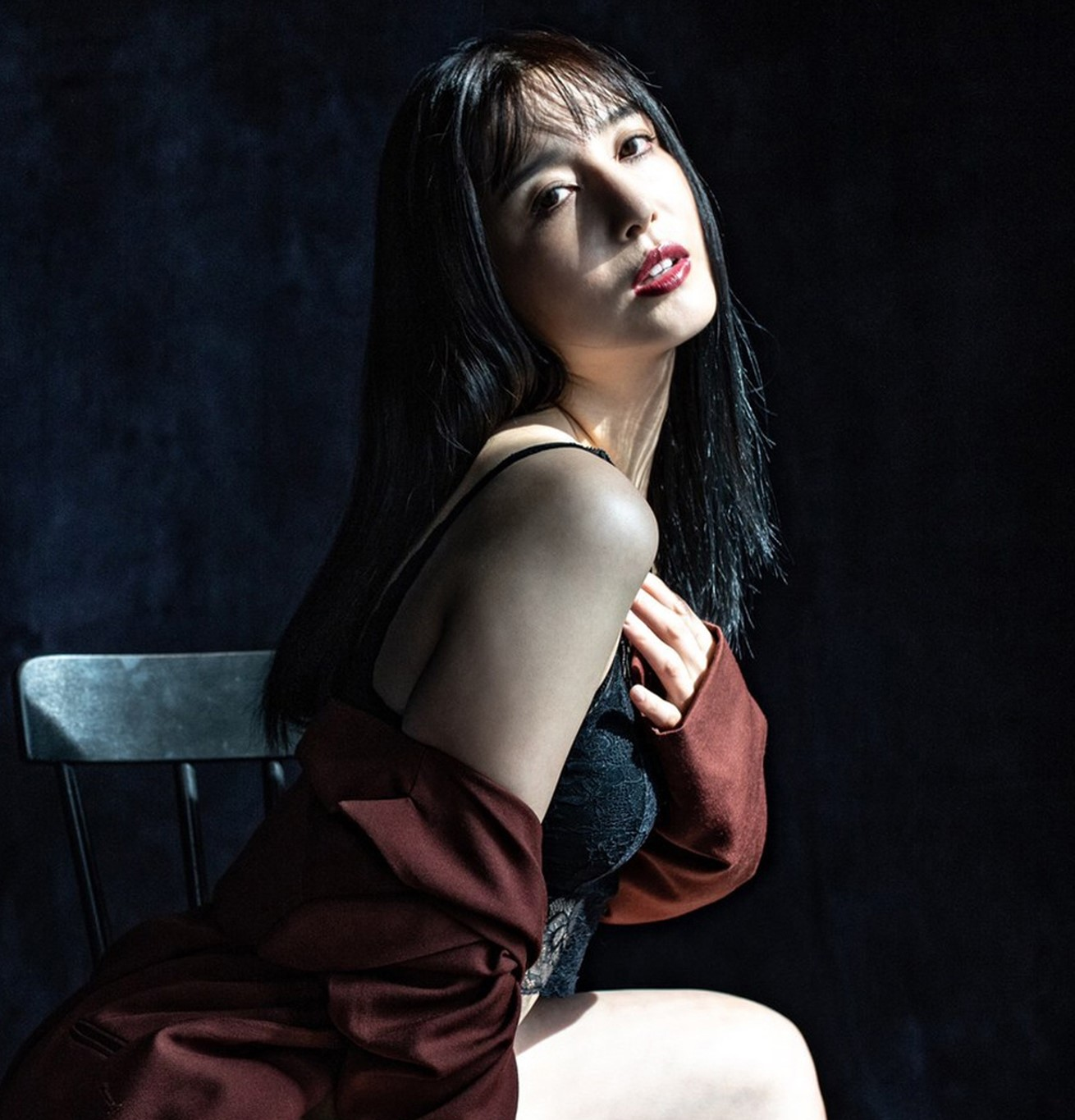
- Kogawa in March 2022
- Born: 25 September 1992 (age 33); Hirakata, Osaka, Japan
- Other name: Kotchan (こっちゃん)
- Years active: 2012–2022
- Known for: Ebisu Muscats 1.5
- Height: 155 cm (5 ft 1 in)
- Awards: 64th SOD Awards Excellent Actress Award (2017); Adult Broadcasting Awards 2017 Cyzo Award (2017)

Iori Kogawa (古川 いおり, Kogawa Iori; born 25 September 1992) is a Japanese former pornographic (AV) actress, pink film actress and idol.

== Early life and career ==
Born in Osaka Prefecture on September 25, 1992, and represented by T-Powers, Kogawa made her AV debut at Soft On Demand and remained an exclusive performer at the company throughout most of her career, starring in over 200 adult films. While being an AV actress, she also appeared in several pink movies and was a member of the idol group Ebisu Muscats. On 31 December 2022, she completely retired as an AV actress and left the office.

=== Rise of popularity and recognition ===
Kogawa showed off her hair nude on the magazine Friday released on 2 November 2012, and debuted from SOD Create from "Iori Kogawa AV Debut" released on 8 November 2012. Her correspondence of an unexpected shooting was taken in Guam just to take a still photo of her debut work.

She received the 64th SOD Awards Excellence Actress Award in 2017.

In July 2014, she entered the sexy actress popularity vote which appeared as a character of the Sega game Yakuza and was selected as 20th place and won the right to appear in Yakuza 0.

On 24 September 2019, she became a member of the second generation Ebisu Muscats.

On 3 March 2017, she won the Cyzo Prize of the 2017 Adult Broadcasting Awards Grand Prix.

=== Retirement ===
On 28 January 2022, she announced her complete retirement as AV actress with no more entertainment activity as of 31 December 2022. Her announcement video was uploaded on YouTube SOFT ON DEMAND (SOD) channel. In addition, the special website entitled with "Arigatou, Iori Kogawa" was released on the SODstar homepage. At the same time, she posted her hand-written retirement message with her side-profile photo on her own twitter account. Her message as follows (original in Japanese):

“As announced on YouTube SOD channel, I have decided to retire completely as AV actress with no more Iori Kogawa’s activity on 31 December 2022. Currently I have nothing special to say about it. I hope you will understand and feel my various feelings through this year. Precious, precious and precious time of the 10th year. I wish I could spend the best year ever with you. I would sincerely thank for all the T-powers’ staffs, SOD office staffs, stores staffs, media staffs, all “Cuticles” members and everyone who knows me. I would look forward to work together with you as well this year. 28 January 2022 Iori Kogawa “

=== Nationwide Final Tour Events ===
On 8 August 2022, she announced that she would hold the nationwide final tour events (ex. her live autographs on DVDs, taking photos of her in a bikini etc) for her fans who would purchase her newly released adult DVDs. Total thirteen events were held in seven Prefectures (Saitama, Fukuoka, Kagawa, Ōsaka, Hyōgo, Hokkaidō, Tokyo-A and Tokyo-B) from September to November in 2022.

== Personal life ==
Her bust was a C cup and she had a complex about her small chest. Her first experience was with a senior one year older than her when she was 18 years old after she entered Osaka's vocational school. She had experience with two men before her AV debut. Her hobby is watching sports. She has two pet dogs.

She has won first place in Muscat Night projects "Muscats Kanji Test (New Year's Muscat's Kanji Test (broadcast 7 January 2016)" and "Muscat's Baka NO.1 Decision Fight! 2017 (broadcast 23 February and 2 March 2017)".

== Works ==
=== Adult videos ===
2012
- Iori Kogawa: AV Debut (8 Nov, SOD Create)
- Iori Kogawa: Watashi, Shinuhodo Sex ga Sukidesu (6 Dec, SOD Create)
2013
- Tomaranai... Chō Tairyō Shiofuki: Iori Kogawa (10 Jan, SOD Create)
- Iori no Ika sekata: Hajirai Ingo de Zenbu Oshiemasu...: Iori Kogawa (7 Feb, SOD Create)
- Netsuretsuna Kiss, soshite Sex...: Iori Kogawa (7 Mar, SOD Create)
- Iori Kogawa×Shirōto Gachinko Dōtei!! Iori ga Yasashiku Fudeoroshi, shite A-ge-ru (11 Apr, SOD Create)
- Iori Kogawa: Chōkōkyū Soap Jō (9 May, SOD Create)
- Iori Kogawa: Kyokugen made Eroku Shinka shita, Iori Kogawa no Nōkō Honki Sex: 4 Honban (6 Jun, SOD Create)
- Iori Kogawa: Hatsu! Naka Dashi Kaikin (6 Jul, SOD Create)
- Shisshin suru hodo... Ikasarete: Iori Kogawa (8 Aug, SOD Create)
- Iori Kogawa: Jokyōshi Rinkan-chū Dashi Ryōjoku Rape (5 Sep, SOD Create)
- User-Sama no Ojitaku ni Shutchō! Iori Kogawa o Fan no Minasama ni Okashi shimasu (10 Oct, SOD Create)
- Asa kara Ban made Sare-ppanashi Chi*po Dai Rankō!: Iori Kogawa (9 Nov, SOD Create)
- Bi-shō-jo: Super Best Collection: Iori Kogawa (21 Nov, SOD Create)
- Chōkōkyū-chū Dashi Soap Jō: Iori Kogawa (5 Dec, SOD Create)
2014
- Taieki-mamire, Otsuyu Chūdoku (9 Jan, SOD Create)
- Iori Kogawa: Otto no Me no Maede, Hentai Otoko ni Okasareru-chū Dashi Kurokami Bijin Tsuma (6 Feb, SOD Create)
- Iori Kogawa: Joshi-ana Kankin Chōkyō Monogatari (6 Mar, SOD Create)
- Iori Kogawa: Yowami o Nigira reta Hitozuma Nurse no Shūchi Kango (10 Apr, SOD Create)
- Ichi Tsuma Jū Otto-sei: Asa-Hiru-Ban: Mainichi Kaji o Shinagara no Sex de Ōisogashi (10 May, SOD Create)
- Iori Kogawa: Honki-jiru o jikkuri Ajiwau Chūnen Otoko no Hentai Sex ni Oboreru (5 Jun, SOD Create)
- AV Fan o Nekkyō sa seta Densetsu Kikaku o, Gōka S-kyū Joyū Kyōen de Zenpen Kanzen Tori oroshi! Soft On Demand Okage-sama de, Nōsugu 20 Shūnenkinen Sakuhin (1 Jul, SOD Create)*AV Open 2014 class super heavyweight entry work
- Iori Kogawa×Emi Asano: Chō Zetchō! Double Geki Iki'! Double Shiofuki Tengoku (10 Jul, SOD Create) Co-star: Emi Asano
- Girl's Pleasure (1 Aug, Silk Labo) Co-star: Ittetsu Suzuki*AV Open 2014 class heavyweight entry work
- Iori Kogawa×Emi Asano: Seikan Esute Chō Furukōsu! Nirinsha Double Service Mansai! Nōmitsu Gohōshi Special! (7 Aug, SOD Create) Co-star: Emi Asano
- Iori Kogawa: Kōnai Rape Shigan (21 Aug, SOD Create)
- Iori Kogawa: Īnari Onsen Ryokō (25 Sep, SOD Create)
- SOD Group 21 Maker: Zenpen Tori oroshi Guide: Vol.2 (9 Oct)*Not for sale
  - Seikan Esute × Triple Course Gokujō no 3P Hassha SP Co-stars: Mana Sakura, Marina Shiraishi
- Iori Kogawa: Seikan Esute × Full Course: 10 Corner 240-bu SP (23 Oct, SOD Create)
- Iori Kogawa: Gibo Rinkan Rape: Musuko no Yūjin-tachi ni Sei Shori Pet to shite Kan sa reru Wakai Haha (8 Nov, SOD Create)
- Iori Kogawa: Seishi, Zenbu Nomu. (6 Dec, SOD Create)
2015
- Iori Kogawa: Hiwaina Koshitsuki to Midarana Kyojiri: Matagari Hame Shiri-chū Dashi Kijō-i (8 Jan, SOD Create)
- Iori Kogawa: Gokudō no Onna: Chū Dashi Rape (5 Feb, SOD Create)
- Iori Kogawa: Ninshin Ingo: Shikyū de Kanjiru Haramase-chū Dashi Sex (5 Mar, SOD Create)
- Iori Kogawa: Super Best Collection Vol.2 (9 Apr, SOD Create)
- Iori Kogawa: Taneuma Semen Bukkake Rodeo (9 May, SOD Create)
- Iori Kogawa: Saikō ni Etchi de Kireina Iori Kogawa ga Anata no Ane ni natte Love Love Konshinsōkan Seikatsu (6 Jun, SOD Create)
- Iori Kogawa: Naka Dashi Tengoku Taneuma (9 Jul, SOD Create)
- Iori Kogawa: Magic Mirror Gō ga Iku!! Fan Kansha-sai! Honmono Fan ga Akogare no Joyū to Suki-hōdai Yareru Gachinko Sex 4 Honban (6 Aug, SOD Create)
- Iori Kogawa: Biyaku Saimin Trans Dai Zetchō Sex (10 Sep, SOD Create)
- Iori Kogawa: Onēsan no Kōkyū Lingerie ni Miserarete... (8 Oct, SOD Create)
- Iori Kogawa: Seppun Chūdoku no Hentai Berokisu Hatsujō Sex (12 Nov, SOD Create)
- Iori Kogawa: Afureru Ai-eki, Daeki, Ase... Taieki-mamire Nōmitsu 'Jiru-on Sex' (10 Dec, SOD Create)
2016
- Iori Kogawa: Honki Les Kaikin! Gōka Bijo Kyōen Peniban Fuck 4 Honban (8 Jan, SOD Create) Co-stars: Miki Sunohara, Kokoa Aisu, Hibiki Ōtsuki, Mao Hamasaki, Nagomi
- Iori Kogawa: Tight Skirt no Yūwaku Senpai OL no Pattsupatsu no Pip Line to Panchira, Futomomo Bikyaku, Eroshiri ni Kōfun sa se rarete... (6 Feb, SOD Create)
- Iori Kogawa: Ryōjoku, Daisuki. Naku hodo Kanjiru Okasa retai Karada (5 Mar, SOD Create)
- Iori Kogawa: Chōkōkyū Nama-chū Dashi Rinkan Club (7 Apr, SOD Create)
- Iori Kogawa: Hitodzuma Kankin Rape: Otto no Debarinaka ni Naka Dashi chōkyō sa reru Elite Wakazuma (12 May, directed by Goro Tameike, SOD Create)
- Ayaman Japan no 'Doko demo, Dare demo, Daijōbu.' (25 May, directed by Ayaman Kantoku, Girl's CH)
- Iori Kogawa: Are kara 1-nen... Saikō ni Etchi de Kireina Iori Kogawa ga Anata no Ane ni natte Love Love Konshinsōkan Seikatsu 2 (9 Jun, SOD Create)
- Iori Kogawa: Tama-ra naku Shirokujichū Shaburita garu Hiwaina Okuchi (7 Jul, SOD Create)
- Iori Kogawa: Shitataru Ame, Ase, Namida...Bishobisho ni naru hodo Hatsujō shi, Muchūde Kairaku o Motomeru Nuresuke Mesukōsei (6 Aug, SOD Create)
- Iori Kogawa: Ninki Joshi-ana no Erosugiru Sugao: Seisode Chitekina Bijin Announcer wa, Private de wa Chō Yariman Onna (12 Sep, SOD Create)
- Iori Kogawa: Sei Shori Omocha M Pet Rinkan Satsuei-kai (6 Oct, SOD Create)
- Iori Kogawa: Mukidashi (10 Nov, SOD Create)
- Tabuchi-shiki: Higidenju -Dōgu ya Tairyoku ni Tayorazu ni Josei o Yorokoba seru koto ga dekiru Sei Gi (10 Nov, SOD Create) Co-star: Hibiki Ōtsuki
- Iori Kogawa: Tomodachi no Ane no Oshiriga Mutchimuchi ni Erosugite Oshiri-sukina Boku wa tsui Hentai de Etchina Mōsō o shite shimau (8 Dec, SOD Create)
2017
- Iori Kogawa: Chi*po Kurui: Jirashi ni Jirasa re chi*po ga Hoshikute tamaranaku natta Onna no Risei Hōkai Renzoku Zetchō Iki makuri Sex! (6 Jan, SOD Create)
- Iori Kogawa: Iyarashi. (2 Feb, SOD Create)
- SOD Fan Dai Kansha-sai: Dekadeka Bus Tour: 160-senchi no Shirōto Dansei o 170-senchi no Bijo 8-mei ga omotenashi: Dekadeka Bus Tour: Shuchinikurin! Jinsei Saikō no Omoide o Todokeru 1-paku 2-nichi no Tabi in Tateyama (16 Feb, SOD Create) Co-stars: Ichika Kamihata, Sesera Harukawa, Maomi Minegishi, Mao Ito, Ayame Ichimatsu, Mariya Kurauchi, Maho Kiriya, Misa Arisawa
- Iori Kogawa: SOD Kansha-sai: Zettai ni Barete wa ikenai Satsuei-chū no Kin Hi: Shitataru Otsuyu to Afureru Toiki: Kyokugen Shūchi Sex (2 Mar, SOD Create)
- Iori Kogawa: Anata no Mimimoto de Yasashiku Ingo o Sasayaku: Naka Dashi Men's Esute Salon (6 Apr, SOD Create)
- Ore no Na wa Iori Kogawa.: Aruhitotsuzen Iori-sensei to Ore ga Irekawatta Hanashi (3 May, SOD Create)
- Mana Sakura Iori Kogawa Marina Shiraishi: Shikkoku: Candle 1-pon: Zenshin Kando Kyūjōshō! Itsumo yori Shinkei ga Togisumasa reta: Nōmitsu Musabori Sex (3 May, SOD Create) Co-stars: Mana Sakura, Marina Shiraishi
- Iori Kogawa: Chō Burakon no Ane ni Yome no iru sugu Soba de Seishi o Shiboritora reru kossori Yari makuri Kyōdō-sei Katsu (1 Jun, SOD Create)
- Iori Kogawa: Yasashiku Teineina Kijō-i de anata o Gohōshi suru: Hannari Kazuyoshi Hito Kasei-fu (6 Jul, SOD Create)
- Iori Kogawa: Pro Chikan-shi-tachi no Ejiki ni sa re Mechakucha Okasa reta Kindan no Ryūshutsu Eizō (10 Aug, SOD Create)
- Shōwa Onna no Elegy: Nerawareta Bijin Shimai (1 Sep, Hibino) Co-star: Ayane Suzukawa*"AV Open 2017" Drama category entry work
- Iori Kogawa: Subete wa Atsui Natsu no Sei...Dōsōkai de Saikai shita Motokare to hito Natsu no Furin ni Ochi Ase o Karamase Nando mo Kairaku o Motometa Hitozuma (7 Sep, SOD Create)
- Iori Kogawa: Kekkon suru made Matenai! Konyaku-chū no Yokkyū Fuman OL ga Rinjin no Chūnen Oyaji ni Nando mo Seishi o Motomeru nettori Naka Dashi Seikō (5 Oct, SOD Create)
- Iori Kogawa: Musuko ga iru sugu Soba de Kireina Hoiku-shi-san ni Yasashiku Daka reru Yūwaku Furin Sex (2 Nov, SOD Create)
- Koisuru Kisetsu: Shinjitsu no Ai wa Sugu Chikaku ni aru... (2 Nov, Girl's CH) Co-stars: Masami Ichikawa, Yuki Yoshizawa, Yoshihiko Arima
2018
- Iori Kogawa: Sensei, ikura Nandemo Ikisugidesu. Ittemo Ittemo Madatarinai! Cho-binkanna Bokudakeno Sourou Katekiyo (11 Jan, SOD Create)
- Iori Kogawa: Koeno Dasenai Bashode Nandomo Keiren Zechō Saserareru Shizukanaru Reipu (8 Feb, SOD Create)
- SODstar dakemitai! Kiritani Matsuri x Kogawa Iori: SODfan Daikannshasai Hassha Museigen Zetsurin Bustour2: Tsuiseki Camera-ga Toraeta Shihukuno Shasei!! 2Kakande Gōkei Nanto 22hatsumo Hassha Sasechai mashita (22 Feb, SOD Create)
- Iori Kogawa: Higaeride 12hatsu Shaseisichau Yarimakuri Ichaicha Onsenryokō (8 Mar, SOD Create)
- Iori Kogawa: Hiwaina Ketsuanawo Mizukara Hirogete Yūwaku nonochi Annal Hikuhiku Daizechō! Ketsuana Misetsukeppanashi (12 Apr, SOD Create)
- Iori Kogawa: Hudanwa Jimīna Bokunoanega Shiranaiaidani Koakumana Ingode Otokowosasoi Chinpode Moteasondeitaken! (10 May, SOD Create)
- Iori Kogawa: 25hon-no Chinpoto Nonstop Bukkake Daidaidai Rankō (7 June, SOD Create)
- Iori Kogawa: Namaikina Yankee Gal ga Yowami wo Nigirare Kyōsei Fukujū! Iyaiya Okasarete tahazuga Kairakunimake Chinpoochi! (12 July, SOD Create)
- Iori Kogawa: Chōbinkan Clitoris Ijirippanashi Zechō Trans SEX (9 Aug, SOD Create)
- Iori Kogawa: Zenshin Seikantai: Karada no Sumizumi made Jikkuri Nettori Kaihatsu sareru Midarana Seikan Therapy (6 Sep, SOD Create)
- Iori Kogawa: Anatadakewo Mitsumenagara Yukkuri Teineini Zechōhe izanau Iyashino Gokujō Slow Fellatio～ALL Gokkun Special～ (11 Oct, SOD Create)
- Iori Kogawa: Yuri to Mitsu Ichizuna Junjō Lesbian-ga Hajimete Chinmakesita!! co-star: Yuuri (8 Nov, SOD Create)
2019
- SOD Joshi Shain 2019nen Shigoto Hajime: Sekimen Hisshino Shinshun Game Tenkomori! Bureikō Shinnenkai de Deisui shichatte Dai Rankō Hime Hajime (10 Jan, SOD Create)
- Iori Kogawa: SNS Reipu: Etaino sirenai Nenchaku Follower ni Shiawasena Hibi wo Kowasareta Ninki Influencer (24 Jan, SOD Create)
- Iori Kogawa: Saijōkyu no Ii Onna to Jikan wo Wasurete Hitobanju Nakadashi SEX (7 Mar, SOD Create)
- Iori Kogawa: Moshi Senmon Gako Jidai no Kōhaikun ni Kuchidokaretara Dōsuru? (9 May, SOD Create)
- Iori Kogawa: Guerrilla Gōu no Yoru ni Akogareno Onnajoshi to Kaisha de Hutarikiri--- Kaerenaku Natta Bokura ha Asa made SEX shimakutta (11 July, SOD Create)
- Iori Kogawa: Kekkonshiki Saichū no Shinrō ni Kyōsei Nakadashi saseru Bijin Wedding Planner (12 Sep, SOD Create)
- SODstar11 SEX BUBBLE Party 2019 ～Pool de Kando Ageage Ikimakuri hen～ (12 Sep, SOD Create)
- Iori Kogawa: Kinbaku Kaikin : Kanzen Kinbaku de Okasare tsuzuke Mesuochi shita Bijin Joi (7 Nov, SOD Create)
- SODstar 10 SEX AFTER PARTY 2019 ～Club-de Hamehame Nukimakuri hen～ (21 Nov, SOD Create)
- Nishino Shō : Last Lez., Co-star: Iori Kogawa etc. (26 Dec, SOD Create)
2020
- Iori Kogawa: Ijōseiinhekinotsuma Dannakōninde Taninno Seishiwonomu Hitozumano Nichijō (9 Jan, SOD Create)
- Iori Kogawa: Shucchōsaki de Dōtei Buka to Aibeya ni --- Mochiawaseteita Condom(kareshiyō)ha 1tsudake --- Tanomi komarete 1kkai dake SEX, nohazuga Bukaga Zetsurin sugite 10ppatsu mo Nakadashi shita (12Mar, SOD Create)
- Iori Kogawa: Musuko no Asadachi Dankon wo Omowazu Onikuwae suru Inrangibo (8 May, SOD Create)
- Yu Shinoda x : Hibiki Ōtsuki x Iori Kogawa: Heyakekkai SPECIAL ～Yōkoso Boku dakeno Inran Gakuen he Ihi!～ (9 July, SOD Create)
- Iori Kogawa: Hetarena Boku wo Sukuinikita Senpai Onna Sōsakanga Akunososikini Rinkan Sareteiru Nowomite Full Bokki (24 Sept, SOD Create)
- Iori Kogawa: Natsu no Inaka de Dōtei no Boku ha Tosiue Itoko no Jōdan wo Maniuke, Nakadashi Shitsuzuketa. Momoiro Kazoku VOL.18 (8 Oct, SOD Create)
- Iori Kogawa: Anata --- Uchino Ryokanga Hanjō Shiteirunoha Watashiga Nakadashi Settai Shiteru karanano (12 Nov, SOD Create)
- Iori Kogawa: Senzoku Dorei: Kinotsuyoi Onna Spy wo Kurikaesu Senō Kaijo de Okashi taoshimasu (20 Nov, SOD Create)
- Iori Kogawa: Daisukina Deriherujō wo Kusai Chinponi mo Shaburitsuku Senyō Seidorei ni Shite mimasenka? (27 Nov, SOD Create)
2021
- Iori Kogawa: Haigure Sennō, Utsukushiki Hitozuma ga Hiwaina Pose de Jūjun na Seishori Dorei ni! (8 Jan, SOD Create)
- Iori Kogawa: Ichido no Furin ga barete --- Shitto de Bōsōsuru Otto ni Kiga kuruisouni naruhodo Aserasare, Manjū de Biccho Biccho no Manko wo Nandomo Ikasare Tsuzuketa Hanashi (11 Mar, SOD Create)
- Karen: Ganmen Yushō Tamaran Ero Megane OL to Namanakadashi x 2 (14 April, IMAGINE)
- Iori Kogawa: Nani ga attemo Zettai ni Okinai Gifu wo Yonayona Non-rem Minkan Futon ni moguri Mubōbina Manko wo Tsukimakuri Nakadashi Shihōdai (20 May, SOD Create)
- Iori Kogawa: "Tsugini Aerunoha, 1kagetsugo dane---." Enkyori Renai no Kanojo to Kagirareta Jikan no Nakade Seishi ga Nakunaru made Hageshiku Nakadashi wo Motome Tsuzuketa Jun-ai Zetsurin Seikō (22 July, SOD Create)
- Iori Kogawa: Jiman no Bijiri de Shinkon Fufu no Danna wo Yūwaku shi Kozukuri Nakadashi SEX wo Motomeru Personal Instructor (23 Sept, SOD Create)
- Iori Kogawa: Toshiue Kanojo no Iori to---. Zenbu ga Slow datta Kyūjitsu Date. (4 Oct, SOD Create)
- Iori Kogawa: Unmei wo Zecchō de Kaero! Daisukina Kareni Kokuhaku surutame Gakusei Jidai ni Time Leap shitanoni Dōkyūsei to SEX shiteshimau Nagasare Yasui Watashi (11 Nov, SOD Create)
2022
- Iori Kogawa: Enjukushita Erotech to Mukidashi no Honnou de Seishi Shaburi Tsukusu. Ima Ichiban, Sukebe de Hiwai na Onnna (27 Jan, SOD Create)
- Iori Kogawa: Seiyoku Shori Senmon SEX Gairai19 Tokubetsuhen: Saishū Shukkin made Nakadashi Chiryō ni Nozomu Bijin Kon-yakusha Nurse ni Kanzen Micchaku! ~Kekkon wo Riyū ni Intai. Taishoku made 1kagetsu~ (23 Feb, SOD Create)
- Iori Kogawa: Saiai no Otto wo Nakushita Utsukushii Sachiusu Mibōjin ha Otokotachi wo Kuruwashi Seishi wo Shiboritoru Shihaikei Psycho M (24 Mar, SOD Create)
- Karen: Ganmen Sai Yushō; Ero Megane OL to Kosutte Saigo no Namanakadashi x 2 (4 Apr, IMAGINE)
- Iori Kogawa: Arekara 6nen---Saikō ni Ecchide Kireina Kogawa Iori ga Anatano Ane ni Natte Love Love Kinshin Sōkan Seikatsu 3 Kanketsuhen ～Ane no Kekon, Sosite Saigono--- ～ (26 May, SOD Create)
- Iori Kogawa: 7nen buri Saigo no Jōsha! Magic Mirror Gō de Kakuchi wo Meguru! Shirōto M-O kun wo Sugo Tech sugiru Kogawa Iori ga Nuite Nuite Nukimakuru 2kakan Gōkei 10 Hassha! ～Intai Count Down SP～ (23 Jun, SOD Create)
- Iori Kogawa: Attōteki na Bi! Utsukushi sugiru Kogawa Iori ga Anatadake no Tameni Shiko-Sapo shite kureru 10 Situations! 190 min Special! (21 Jul, SOD Create)
- Iori Kogawa: Make love, Takusan Tōmawari shita keredo, Daisuki na Kare tono Aishiau Sex ga Kekkyoku Ichiban Shiawase (8 Sep, SOD Create)
- Iori Kogawa: The Last Video; part I: Jōkyō shite kara Joyū to shite ikita 10 nen wo tadori, Tsuini Tōtatsu shita Jinsei de Ichiban Kanjiru SEX (20 Oct, SOD Create)
- Iori Kogawa: The Last Video; part II: Kokyō wo Meguri Mirai eto Omoi wo Haseru --- Hitori no Josei to shite Saigo ni Miseru Sugao Mukidashi SEX (10 Nov, SOD Create)

=== Image videos ===
- Iori Kogawa wa Ore no Kanojo. (25 Mar 2015, Garden)
- Boku no Oyomesan ha Kogawa Iori: Iori Kogawa (28 Jan 2017, Orustaksoft Sales)
- Iori Australia Dream: Iori Kogawa（6 April 2017, REbecca）
- Kogawa Iori ga Sukisugite Kogawa Iori ga Kanojo ni Natteta: Iori Kogawa (25 June 2017, Graphis)
- Aphrodite: Iori Kogawa (18 May 2018, Finepictures)
- Hair Nude～Mushūsei Seisokei Slender Bijin・Sexy joyū～: Iori Kogawa (26 Dec. 2018, Sparkvision)
- Iori2: Taiyō to Mugiwara Bōshi : Iori Kogawa (19 Sept. 2019, REbecca)
- Iori3: Nanyō no OASIS: Iori Kogawa (22 Oct. 2020, REbecca)

== Filmography ==
=== Television ===
- Beat Takeshi no Ato 6-kai dake yara sete TV (29 Dec 2012, TBS)
- Beach 9 (Jan, Apr, Jul 2013, Jul, Nov 2014, TV Saitama) – Monthly guest
- Ai no Etude #30 (2013, Enta! 959)
- Buki wa TV. SMAP×FNS 27-jikan TV (26–27 Jul 2014, CX)
  - Sanma-Nakai no Konya mo Nemurenai "Absolutely Get a Mobile Number of a Sexy Actress Who Does Not Put a Honey Trap!" (27 1:30–)
- Ishi Mondainashinokai (20 Dec 2014, BeeTV)
- Butcha Ke jō: 26-ji no Cinderella (5, 12, 19, 26 Feb 2015, TX)
- Babricious Road: Aniki to Ore Monogatari (7 Oct 2015 – BS11)*Seishun-hen #4 #6, as 'Mikomi's fortune-teller'
- Muscat Night (8 Oct 2015 – 30 Mar 2017, TX)
- Deep J Room (15 Nov 2015, MXTV)
- Otoko no Zap: Nama Iki! Janpoke Cruise (5 May 2016, BS SukaPā!)
- Muscat Night Fever!!! (6 Apr – 28 Sep 2017, TX)
- Gyotaku to Naruse no Tsuki to Suppon pon #161, #162 (1, 8 Oct 2017), #406, #407 (12, 19 Jun 2022), Pachi Suro Site Seven TV
- Ebisu Muscats Yokochō! (5 Oct - 28 Dec 2017 – TX)
- Ken Koba no Bakobako Night: Yoru no Bakoba Kōjien (MC: Kendo Kobayashi, 5 Aug, 30 Sep, 28 Oct, 25 Nov and 23 Dec 2022, Sun TV)

=== Films ===
- Kanashiki Gangu: Nobuko-sensei no Kimagure (2 Sep 2015, Director: Hideo Jojo, R15+) - as 'Nobuko' (teacher)
- Etsuraku-Kōsaten: Onna no Ura ni Deau Toki (18 Dec 2015, Director: Hideo Jojo, R18+) - as 'Makoto Kawashima' (full-time housewife); Another edition (R15+): Etsuraku-Kōsaten (21 Aug 2016)
- Summer with Mica (2016)
- Hitozuma no Toiki: Midara ni Aishite (3 May 2019, OP Pictures, R18+) – as 'Shinobu Kobayashi'
- Nure Efude: Katei Kyōshi to Musuko no Yome (27 Sep 2019, OP Pictures, R18+) – as 'Manami Fujimura'
- Mitchaku Shidō: Oshiete Ageru (5 Nov 2021, OP Pictures, R18+) – as 'Nozomi Suzuhara'; Another edition: Koko deha nai Dokoka he ～Watashi ga Okashita Tsumi to Batsu～ (12 Nov 2021, R15+)
- Maniac Driver (7 Jan 2022, Director: Kurando Mitsutake, MMXXI Akari Pictures, R15+) - as 'Mayumi' and 'Fujinaga’s wife': two roles)

=== Direct-to-video (aka: V-cinema) *R15+ ===
- Bijinzuma-hakusho: Tonari no Shiba wa (2013, Director: Sadao Jo, Albatross) Co-star: Koi Miyamura
- Ura Mājan Bishin Retsuden: Tsubushi-ya Reika (8 Jan 2014, Albatross)
- Ikenai! Luna-sensei: Yasashiku mui te ne-hen (8 Jan 2014, SPO)
- Gokuzuma Ninkyō Gakuen (20 Jul 2014, Line Communications)
- Sexual Dynamite Heroine 02 (12 Sep 2014, Zen-Pictures)
- Shinnin Onnnakyōshi: Mijukuna Shinro Shidō (3 Dec 2014, Albatross) - as 'Natsuko Izumi' (teacher)
- Jō-ō Game (15 Dec 2014, Line Communications) Co-stars: Megu Fujiura, Ayaka Fujikita, Tomohiro Okada
- Jitsuroku: Onna no Hanzai III (5 Jun 2015, All In Entertainment) – ‘Yūko’
- Jigoku Mājan: Kōshoku Battle Royale 168-jikan! (8 Jul 2015, Toei Video) – as 'Kyoka Niki' (mahjong player)
- Tokyo Chika Joshi Keimusho CHAPETR2: AREA99 (6 Jan 2016, Albatross) – ‘Saki’ (drug inspector)
- Yakuza no Onna 6 (4 Mar 2016, All In Entertainment) – as 'Maki'
- Yakuza no Onna 7 (3 Jun 2016, All In Entertainment) – as 'Maki'
- Yakuza no Onna 8 (5 Aug 2016, All In Entertainment) – as 'Maki'
- Wakazuma Dōsōkai (3 Aug 2016, Amazing D.C.) – ‘Shizuka’
- Shin Jō-ō Game: Kaettekita Densetsu no Onna (2 Dec 2016, Takeshobō) - ‘Chizuru’, Co-star: Kizuna Sakura
- Kairaku Shashinkan: Eros ha Anshitsu no Nakani (2 May 2017, Takeshobō) – as ‘Naomi’
- Onna Yamikin -Chizuru- Kane ni Mamireta Sex Jigoku (5 Jul 2017, Takeshobō) – as 'Chizuru'
- Onna Yamikin -Chizuru- Kanjuku: Seiyoku wo Kateni suru Bijū no Yūwaku. (2 Feb 2019, Takeshobō) – as 'Chizuru'
- Ecstasy Revenge -Kaori- (3 Jul 2018, Takeshobō) – ‘Kaori’
- Geisha2 ～GEISHA2～ (25 Dec 2019, All In Entertainment) – ‘Sadako Abe’
- Hitozuma Katei Kyōshi (2 Dec 2020, Breeze, Happinet) – ‘Ayumi’
- Gokudō Apartment: Maison de Eros he Yōkoso! (2 Jun 2021, Takeshobō) – ‘Noriko’
- Tsuma Tachino Honnō: Sokubaku Furin (3 Jun 2022, Breeze, Happinet) – ‘Yoshiko’

=== Internet television ===
- (28 Aug 2015 –, Director: Ayaman Kantoku, girls-ch)

=== Video games ===
- Yakuza 0 (12 Mar 2015, Sega)

=== Pachinko ===
- CR Toyomaru to Soft On Demand no Saishin-saku (Jan 2017, Toyomaru Industry)

== Bibliography ==
=== Magazines ===
- EX Taishū (Issued 15 Dec 2012) interview
- DMM (Feb 2013 issue) interview
- Hitozuma DVD Dream Mar 2015 issue (2 Feb 2015, Sanwa Publishing Company)
- Lowridaz Mar issue vol.29 (13 Feb 2015, Schizo Club)
- Weekly Playboy 11, 18 May 2015 issue, 12 Oct issue (27 Apr, 28 Sep 2015, Shueisha)
- Nīgata Date Hotel 2015 Saishinhan (18 Jul 2015, News Line)
- Tokusen! Hitozuma DVD dream 6: Otto o Uragiru Wakazuma-tachi (27 Jul 2015, Sanwa Publishing Company)
- Nippon Camera Sep '15 issue (20 Aug 2015, Nippon Camera Company)

=== Modelling ===
- Super Pose Book: Nude Pair-hen (19 May 2014, Cosmic Shuppan) cooperation with Kokone Mizutani

=== Calendars ===
- Iori Kogawa: 2014-nen Calendar (Aug 2013, Pagoromo) ISBN 978-4801205505

=== Photo albums ===
- Dreaming (Feb 10th 2017, Genkosha, Shooting: Yuji Fukushima) ISBN 978-4768308141
- Cosplay Fetish Book (Dec 1st 2021, GOT Corporation, Shooting: Hiroaki Tamura）ISBN 978-4-8236-0252-8
