= Northern Limit Line (film) =

2015 South Korean historical naval film

- Theatrical poster
- Hangul: 연평해전
- Hanja: 延坪海戰
- RR: Yeonpyeonghaejeon
- MR: Yŏnp'yŏnghaejŏn
- Directed by: Kim Hak-soon
- Written by: Kim Hak-soon
- Produced by: Jung Moon-goo
- Starring: Kim Mu-yeol; Jin Goo; Lee Hyun-woo
- Cinematography: Kim Hyung-koo
- Edited by: Steve M. Choe
- Music by: Mok Young-jin
- Production company: Rosetta Cinema
- Distributed by: Next Entertainment World
- Release date: June 24, 2015
- Running time: 130 minutes
- Country: South Korea
- Language: Korean
- Budget: US$6 million
- Box office: US$38.9 million

Northern Limit Line (Korean: 연평해전; lit. 'Battle of Yeonpyeong') is a 2015 South Korean naval thriller film written and directed by Kim Hak-soon, based on the real-life events of the Second Battle of Yeonpyeong. It stars Kim Mu-yeol, Jin Goo, and Lee Hyun-woo.

== Plot ==
Corporal Park Dong-hyuk is a newly enlisted sailor in the Republic of Korea Navy assigned to the patrol vessel PKM 357. In the midst of the 2002 FIFA World Cup taking place in South Korea, North Korea deploys fishing trawlers with spies to cross the Northern Limit Line (the demarcation line at sea). PKM 357 seizes the trawlers and their men, which allows the spies to familiarise themselves with the ship's superstructure. The North Koreans are eventually released upon orders by the South Korean high command, as part of the government's Sunshine Policy.

Over the coming month, North Korea's Korean People's Navy repeatedly enters South Korean waters to reconnoitre and survey the ROK Navy's patrolling tactics and defensive measures. The South Korean Ministry of Defense is notified about North's strategy but is again ordered by the Blue House to not engage first. South Korea also receives intelligence reports that an attack is forthcoming, but does not change the rules of engagement to counter the looming threat despite the repeated requests of PKM 357's commander, Lieutenant Commander Yoon Young-ha.

On 29 June 2002, the second Battle of Yeonpyeong commences with a surprise attack on PKM 357 by a North Korean patrol vessel. The ensuing battle severely cripples both ships before reinforcements from the South arrive and force the North's patrol vessel to retreat. 19 wounded and 4 deaths are confirmed before PKM 357 sinks due to uncontrollable fires. Naval divers eventually find the helmsman's body in the sunken vessel.

83 days later, Park Dong-hyuk succumbs to his wounds, becoming the final casualty of the battle. The movie ends with the real life surviving crew members reminiscing about their colleagues with photos of those who perished.

== Cast ==
- Kim Mu-yeol as Lieutenant Yoon Young-ha (posthumous: Lieutenant Commander)
- Jin Goo as Petty Officer 1st Class Han Sang-guk
- Lee Hyun-woo as Petty Officer 3rd Class Park Dong-hyuk (soldier)
- Lee Wan as Lieutenant JG Lee Hee-wan
- Kim Ji-hoon as Petty Officer 1st Class Jo Chun-hyung
- Jang Joon-hak as Petty Officer 1st Class Hwang Do-hyun
- Joo Hee-joong as Petty Officer 1st Class Seo Hoo-won
- Kim Dong-hee as Petty Officer 3rd class Kwon Gi-hyung
- Kim Ha-kyun as Boatswain
- Han Seong-yong as Petty Officer 2nd Clasd Lee
- Kim Dong-beom as Kim Il-byung
- Lee Cheol-min as Unit 232 general
- Park Jeong-hak as Lee Dae-joon
- Cheon Min-hee as Kim Ji-sun
- Kwon Hwa-woon as Petty Officer 3rd Class Kim Seung-hyun
- Park Hyo-jun
- Jang Eui-soo as Kim Myoen-soo
- Lee Chung-ah as Lieutenant Choi Yoon-jung (cameo)
- Song Jae-ho as Yoon Doo-ho (cameo)
- Sunwoo Jae-duk as young Yoon Doo-ho (cameo)
- Kim Hee-jung as Park Dong-hyuk's mother (cameo)
- Choi Jong-hwan as North Korean high-ranking official (cameo)
- Jung Joo-ri as Visiting girl (cameo)

== Production ==
Director Kim Hak-soon shot the film in 3D, having received a US$1 million grant from the Korean Film Council (3D effects were done by Dnext Media). Kim said, "I believe that 3D visuals would enable viewers to feel the pain and fear felt by the (men) in a more effective and immersive way."

After initial investors backed out, it took the film seven years to finish production. A third of the US$6 millionbudget was raised through crowdfunding via donations by 7,000 individuals. They include 23 members of the 2002 South Korea national football team, and Chung Mong-joon, owner of Hyundai Heavy Industries Group and former president of the Korea Football Association, who donated ₩100 million.

== Release ==
Northern Limit Line was originally set to premiere on June 11, 2015, but due to concerns over the MERS outbreak, distributor Next Entertainment World delayed the theatrical release by two weeks to June 24.

== Box office ==
The film topped the box office on its opening day, and by its first four days of release it had recorded 1.43 million admissions, grossing ₩8.7 billion (US$7.8 million); this was notable since June is considered a slow season for the Korean film industry.

As of August 2, it has sold 6,024,894 tickets (grossing US$38,945,231), making it the most-watched Korean film in 2015.

== Political reception ==
While North Korean state media outlet Uriminzokkiri lambasted it, calling it "distorted" and an "anti-DPRK movie," South Korean conservative politicians such as former president Lee Myung-bak recommended the film.

== Awards and nominations ==
Year	Award	Category	Recipient	Result
2015	52nd Grand Bell Awards	Best Film	Northern Limit Line	Nominated
2015	52nd Grand Bell Awards	Best Director	Kim Hak-soon	Nominated
2015	52nd Grand Bell Awards	Best New Actor	Lee Hyun-woo	Nominated
2015	30th Korea Best Dresser Swan Awards	Best Rising Star	Lee Hyun-woo	Won
2016	49th WorldFest-Houston International Film Festival	Best Supporting Actor	Lee Hyun-woo	Won
