= Choi Tae-hwan =

South Korean actor and model

- Born: February 28, 1989 (age 37); South Korea
- Occupations: Actor; model
- Years active: 2012–present
- Agent: Choii Entertainment

Korean name
- Hangul: 최태환
- RR: Choe Taehwan
- MR: Ch'oe T'aehwan

Choi Tae-hwan (born February 28, 1989) is a South Korean actor and model.

== Filmography ==
=== Film ===
Year	Title	Role
2015	Speed	Sung Dae-sung
2016	Phantom Detective	Hong Gil-dong's subordinate
2020	Heart	Je-sub
2021	Mission: Possible	Youngest detective

=== TV films ===
Year	Title	Role
2015	I'm After You	Lee Kun

=== Television series ===
Year	Title	Role
2012	KBS Drama Special: Swamp Ecology Report	Sang-jin
2013	The Heirs	Lee Sang-woo
2014	Secret Affair	Son Jang-ho
2014	Quiz of God	Park Soo-yong (season 4; ep.4)
2014	My Secret Hotel	Jang Ki-chul
2014	Ballerino	Lee Pyung-ho
2015	KBS Drama Special: Hair Day	Byun In-bum
2015	The Scholar Who Walks the Night	Ho-jin
2015	Imaginary Cat	Lee Wan
2016	Madame Antoine: The Love Therapist	Sung-ho (ep.5-6)
2016	Woman with a Suitcase	Choi Hoon-suk
2016	The Facetale: Cinderia	Wang Sae-son
2017	Queen of the Ring	Ma Deuk-chan
2018	Witch's Love	Choi Min-soo
2019	The Secret Life of My Secretary	Eun Jung-soo
2019	Psychopath Diary	Shin Suk-hyun
2020	No, Thank You	Kim Chul-soo
2021	Hello, Me!	Cha Seung-suk
2021	Secret Royal Inspector & Joy	Park Do-soo
2023	Delivery Man	Na Seok-jin
2023	The Secret Romantic Guesthouse	Yoon Gu-nam
2023	King the Land	Seo Chung-jae
