= Kirara Asuka =

Japanese AV idol

- 明日花 キララ
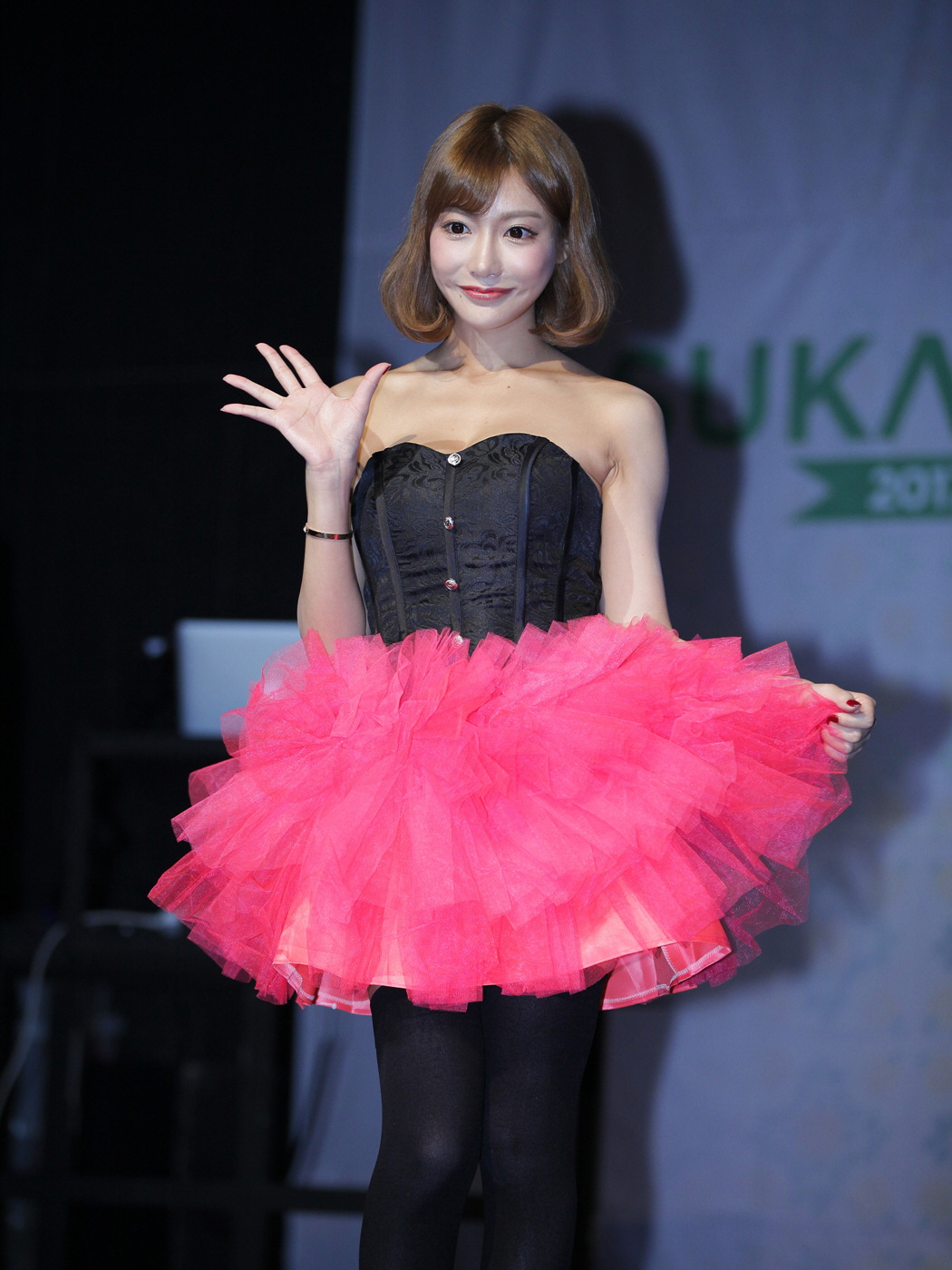
- Asuka in 2017
- Born: October 2, 1988 (age 38); Tokyo, Japan
- Years active: 2007–2020
- Height: 1.62 m (5 ft 4 in)

Kirara Asuka (Japanese: 明日花 キララ, Hepburn: Asuka Kirara; born October 2, 1988) is a Japanese model and former adult video (AV) actress.

== Career ==
Before her debut, Kirara Asuka was a female waitress working at a Kyabakura (Hostess club) in Roppongi. One day, a scout from an adult video company visited the store as a guest, and scouting took place on the spot, making her debut as an adult video actress. Her debut film was released on h.m.p on 21 December 2007 and her work was titled Miracle Beauty Breast (ミラクル美乳). She ended her contract with h.m.p in September 2009 and moved to PRESTIGE the following month. She shot a total of 42 works in her PRESTIGE, she ended her contract in April 2013, and in June of the same year she moved to S1 No. 1 Style.

She works as an adult video actress and in 2009, she won the Sky PerfecTV! Adult Broadcasting Awards Best Actress Award, and in 2014 she won the Topical Award at the DMM Adult Awards in collaboration with Akiho Yoshizawa. Meanwhile, she has been active in various fields besides adult videos. First of all, she appeared in six films until 2015, starting with her appearance in the V Cinema Vitamin LOVE Mizuka (ビタミンLOVE みずか) released through the GP Museum in December 2010. She starred in the 2012 SF action film Iron Girl, and also starred in the 2015 SF action film Iron Girl ULTIMATE WEAPON.

In 2012, she launched a music career project called "KiraKira Music Lovers" and released a single. Starting with her first single I Want To Meet You, I Want To Meet You. on 8 October 2012, she released Shining Star in November of the same year and IMITATION LOVE the following month. The single will not be released on iTunes, Oricon, etc., and will be sold live on-site.

She has been a member of the Ebisu Muscats since 24 September 2015, and was named the group's fourth leader on 21 December 2015. She also appeared on the late-night variety show Muscats Night, which aired on TV Tokyo from 7 October 2015 to 30 March 2017, and on the late-night variety show Muscats Night Fever, which aired on TV Tokyo from 6 April to 28 September 2017.

On 11 February 2016, she debuted as a solo artist by releasing a song titled I Love You (愛してるよ) on iTunes. She graduated from Ebisu Muscats 1.5 (Successor of the Ebisu Muscats) on 17 April 2018. She released a style book in June 2019, and the limited edition, supported by a woman in her 20s, was immediately sold out, and the regular edition was also sold out in one month.

On 4 February 2020, she announced her retirement from the adult video stage after a two-year break, and her agency moved to Top Rank Management. On 2 June, she moved to Kiratis, where she opened her YouTube channel "Kira Land" on 11 June.

On October 7, 2022, Namewee, a renowned but controversial Malaysian musician, released a song on YouTube entitled "What I Love," featuring Kirara Asuka.
