= Dear Dictator (2014 film) =

- Directed by: Lee Sang-woo
- Screenplay by: Lee Sang-woo
- Produced by: Pierce Conran
- Starring: Kim Yeong-geon; Shin Won-ho; Seo Hyun-seok
- Cinematography: Kim Min-su
- Edited by: Lee Chae-hyun
- Music by: Kang Min-kook
- Release dates: May 2014 (Jeonju International Film Festival); December 31, 2015 (South Korea)
- Running time: 99 minutes
- Country: South Korea
- Language: Korean

Dear Dictator (Korean: 친애하는 지도자동지께; RR: Chinaehaneun jidojadongjikke) is a 2014 South Korean drama film written and directed by South Korean indie provocateur Lee Sang-woo. It was first shown at the 15th Jeonju International Film Festival in 2014 and was one of the most talked about films of the event.

== Synopsis ==
Buk-seong, Young-rim and Woo-seok are school dropouts from broken homes and live in a shanty town. One day, a North Korean spy begins video-recording their lives for use as part of North Korea's propaganda.

== Cast ==
- Kim Yeong-geon as Buk-seong
- Shin Won-ho as Young-rim
- Seo Hyun-seok as Woo-seok
- Lee Joo-min as Hee-soo
- Jo Ha-suk as Spy
- Lee Tae-rim as Book-seong's father

== Reception ==
Dear Dictator received generally positive critical reception.
