= No Zin-soo =

South Korean filmmaker (born 1970)

- Born: 9 March 1970 (age 56); Daegu, South Korea
- Education: Yeungnam University
- Occupations: Film director screenwriter

Korean name
- Hangul: 노진수
- RR: No Jinsu
- MR: No Chinsu

No Zin-soo (Korean: 노진수; born March 9, 1970) is a South Korean film director and screenwriter.

== Career ==
Born in Daegu in 1970, No Zin-soo majored in Korean Language and Literature at the Yeungnam University. He was involved in commercial film productions before he made his first feature-length debut with Da Capo (2007) and was invited to the 8th Jeonju International Film Festival. His second feature Norwegian Woods (2010) was invited to the Bucheon International Fantastic Film Festival 2009 and the Yubari International Fantastic Film Festival in 2010.

No is noted for his unique directing style with films of different genre types.

== Filmography ==
- Love Wind Love Song (1999) - art director
- Tell Me Something (1999) - production department
- Bloody Beach (2000) - screenwriter
- Asako in Ruby Shoes (2000) - 2nd assistant director
- Bet on My Disco (2002) - script editor
- Da Capo (2007) - director, editor, script editor, actor
- Norwegian Woods (2010) - director, screenwriter
- Total Messed Family (2014) - director, screenwriter
- The Suffered (2014) - director, screenwriter, actor
- The Maidroid (2015) - director, executive producer, script editor
- Nineteen: Shh! No Imagining! (2015) - director
- Death in Desert (2015) - director, screenwriter, actor
- Summer of Director Oh (2016) - director, producer, screenwriter
- Female War: A Nasty Deal (2016) - director,
- Manner Teacher (2016) - director, script editor
