= Speed (2015 film) =

- Film poster
- Directed by: Lee Sang-woo
- Screenplay by: Lee Sang-woo
- Produced by: Na Yong-kuk; Pierce Conran; Dong-jin Oh
- Starring: Seo Jun-young; Baek Sung-hyun; Choi Tae-hwan; Byun Jun-suk
- Edited by: Lee Sang-woo
- Release date: October 22, 2015
- Running time: 104 minutes
- Country: South Korea
- Language: Korean

Speed (Korean: 스피드) is a 2015 South Korean melodrama film written and directed by South Korean indie provocateur Lee Sang-woo. It made its world debut at the 16th Jeonju International Film Festival and its North American premiere in Austin at the 11th Fantastic Fest in 2015.

== Synopsis ==
It tells the story of four high school friends and the dark side of youth as they continues their headlong leap into adulthood.

== Cast ==
- Seo Jun-young as Lee Choo-won
- Baek Sung-hyun as Ma Goo-rim
- Choi Tae-hwan as Sung Dae-sung
- Byun Jun-suk as Choi Seo-won
- Shin Seo-hyun as Eun-ae
- Im Hyung-joon as Teacher Park
- Lee Sang-ah as Mi-ja
- Lee Sang-woo as Rapist/Itaewon club kiss man
