= Kim Hak-soon =

South Korean filmmaker (born 1954)

- Born: 1954 (age 71–72); South Korea
- Occupations: Film director screenwriter

Korean name
- Hangul: 김학순
- RR: Gim Haksun
- MR: Kim Haksun

Kim Hak-soon (Korean: 김학순; born 1954) is a South Korean film director and screenwriter. Kim wrote and directed the naval thriller film Northern Limit Line (2015), which depicts a real-life naval skirmish with North Korea in June 2002. It drew more than 6 million viewers 29 days after its release on June 24, 2015, making it one of the top-grossing film in 2015.

== Filmography ==
- Dandelion (short film, 2001) - director, screenwriter, producer, cinematographer
- Rewind (2003) - director, screenwriter, planner
- Kentucky Blues (short film, 2008) - producer, director
- Abandoned (animation short, 2008) - screenwriter, director, editor, animator
- Northern Limit Line (2015) - director, screenwriter, producer

== Awards ==
- 1991 Eastman Scholarship
- 2004 12th Chunsa Film Art Awards: Best New Director (Rewind)
- 2004 [Hawaii International Film Festival]: NETPAC Award ('Rewind')
- 2004 [Houston International Film Festival]: Special Jury Award ('Rewind')
- 2016 [Macao International Film Festival]: Gold Aries Award - Best Cinematography ('Northern Limit Line')
- 2016 [Houston International Film Festival]: Special Jury Award ('Northern Limit Line')
- 2016 [Korea Culture Entertainment Awards]: Best Film, Best Director ('Northern Limit Line')
