= Yuuri Morishita =

Former Japanese actress, television personality, and singer (born 1985)

Yuri Morishita
- 森下 悠里
- Born: January 30, 1985 (age 41); Hachiōji, Tokyo, Japan
- Occupations: Actress; singer; gravure model (formerly)
- Years active: 2003–present
- Height: 160 cm (5 ft 3 in)
- Spouse: Undisclosed (m. 2017)
- Children: 1

Yuri Morishita (森下 悠里, Morishita Yūri; born January 30, 1985, in Hachiōji, Tokyo) is a Japanese actress, television personality, singer, and former gravure model who is represented by the talent agency Asche.

== Early life and career ==
Morishita was born in Hachiōji, Tokyo in 1985. Her father is from Saitama Prefecture, and her mother is from Tokyo. She has two older brothers, who are six and three years older than her. Morishita has said that her second elder brother had worked as a model during high school and that there was a bus in Thailand with an advertisement featuring her brother. This prompted her to try modeling herself.

She went to elementary school in Hachiōji, and went to another elementary school six years later in Saitama Prefecture. After graduating from high school, Morishita went to Atomi Junior College, Tokyo. She hoped to become a flight attendant, but after graduating from Atomi Junior College in 2005, she was invited to News Promotion.

== Personal life ==
On June 16, 2017, Morishita revealed that she had married a non-celebrity man on June 8 of the same year. The two had known each other for over ten years. Following her marriage, she retired from being a gravure model. On September 29, she announced that she was expecting her first child. On February 25, 2018, she announced the birth of her first child, a daughter.

== Filmography ==
=== TV series ===
Year	Title	Role	Network	Notes
2007	ChocoMimi	Teacher Haruna	TV Tokyo	
2008	Cooking Papa	Keiko Hirota	Fuji TV	
2009	Kamen Rider W	Fuyumi Aso	TV Asahi	

=== Films ===
Year	Title	Role	Notes
2007	Fujoshi Rumi	Yuki Chiba	
2008	The Monster X Strikes Back/Attack the G8 Summit	Interpreter Woman No. 8	
