= The Maidroid =

- Movie Poster
- Hangul: 친절한 가정부
- RR: Chinjeolhan gajeongbu
- MR: Ch'injŏrhan kajŏngbu
- Directed by: No Zin-soo
- Starring: Aino Kishi; Young Geon; Yeon Song-ha; Park In-soo; Hong Joo-hyeong; Park Hee-soon; Hyun Tae-kyung
- Release date: 26 February 2015 (South Korea)
- Running time: 75 minutes
- Country: South Korea
- Languages: Korean; Japanese

The Maidroid (Korean: 친절한 가정부; lit. 'The Kind Maid') is a 2015 South Korean comedy and pink film.

In 2015, this film premiered in Yubari International Fantastic Film Festival in Japan.

It is a Korean-style pink comedy film with science fiction gimmicks.

It is a story about a man fallen into his dream and his desire, love, and setbacks.

== Plot ==
Sangsoo, a man who is working in a Korean karaoke with prostitutes, receives a mysterious parcel in his house. He opens the box and finds that there is a maidroid called Pinky who only speaks in Japanese and is developed by a company called realbot corporation. He also learns that he got this maidroid as a giveaway that is only allowed to a select few for a test of a new model that is consistently monitored. First, Pinky is shown to be actually doing her maid work, but as the story progresses, Pinky seems to be actually sending Sangsu off from his residence with the excuse of giving him time to exercise. Because the maidroid is too pretty, Sangsoo tries to exploit the maidroid into doing sexual favors for him that does not follow the maidroid's original usage in the manual. Meanwhile, in the karaoke, Sangsoo develops feelings for a prostitute called Hyeonah, but she initially refuses because he does not have enough money to buy her stuff. He also is visited by a person from the realbot corporation in the karaoke that tells him that using the maidroid for sexual purposes can result in a violation of policy and lead to the self destruction and explosion of the maidroid. However, in another scene, it is revealed that the maidroid and the person from the company are actually real people who are lovers, and the whole maidroid thing is actually just a ploy to retrieve the money from Sangsu, but Sangsu does not know the scheme. In the karaoke, Hyeonah, now interested in Sangsu, asks him why he loves her, and he answers that he loves her for being herself and wants to go to New Zealand with, her but she refuses again. Sangsoo watches Hyeonah having sex with another guest, and after learning about the voyeurism, she slaps Sangsoo, and the two people cry as they part ways with each other. A disappointed Sangsu returns home and has forceful sex with the maidroid to compensate for the loss. During the whole intercourse in the toilet, she accidentally discovers the money hidden inside the toilet. To distract Sangsoo from this discovery, she and Sangsoo have sex in order to comfort him and convince him that she is just a mere maidroid. The next day, Sangsoo awakes from his sleep and gets a call from the "realbot" company that he has been deprived of his maidroid for "violations" of the company policy. The film ends by zooming into a picture of the seaside with dialogue that implies Hyeonah and Sangsoo reunited and went to New Zealand together as he had promised.

== Cast ==
- Yeong geon - Sangsoo
- Aino Kishi - Pinky
- Yeon Seong ha - Hyeonah
