= Lee Sang-woo (director) =

South Korean filmmaker (born 1971)

- Born: February 24, 1971 (age 55); South Korea
- Education: University of California, Berkeley
- Occupations: Film director; screenwriter

Korean name
- Hangul: 이상우
- RR: I Sangu
- MR: I Sangu

Lee Sang-woo (Korean: 이상우; born 24 February 1971), is a South Korean film director, screenwriter and actor. His films are sexual, violent and controversial, and are often based on real events.

== Personal life ==
Lee graduated from University of California, Berkeley, majoring in film.

== Career ==
Lee has been in the film industry for a long time, most notably as Kim Ki-duk's assistant director, before making the transition to becoming a prolific director in his own right. His official debut was Tropical Manila in 2008.

== Filmography ==
=== As director ===
- Tropical Manila (2008)
- Mother Is a Whore (2009)
- Father Is a Dog (2010)
- Barbie (2012)
- Novel Meets Movie (segment: "Emergency Exit") (2013)
- Fire in Hell (2014)
- All About My Father (omnibus film, 2015)
- Speed (2015)
- Dear Dictator (2015)
- I Am Trash (2016)
- Working Street (2016)
- Dirty Romance (2017)
- Bittersweet Brew (2018)
- Folklore (episode: "Mongdal") (2018)

=== As screenwriter ===
- Tropical Manila (2008)
- Mother Is a Whore (2009)
- Father Is a Dog (2010)
- Barbie (2012)
- Fire in Hell (2014)
- Speed (2015)
- Dear Dictator (2015)
- I Am Trash (2016)
- Working Street (2016)
- Dirty Romance (2017)
- Bittersweet Brew (2018)
- Folklore (episode: "Mongdal") (2018)

=== As actor ===
- Mother Is a Whore (2009)
- I Am Trash (2016)
