= Aino Kishi =

Japanese AV idol and actress

- 希志あいの
- Born: February 1, 1988 (age 38); Tokyo, Japan
- Occupations: Actress; singer; AV idol
- Years active: 2008–2015
- Height: 156 cm (5 ft 1 in)
- Website: www.duo-official.com/models/aino-kishi.htm

Signature
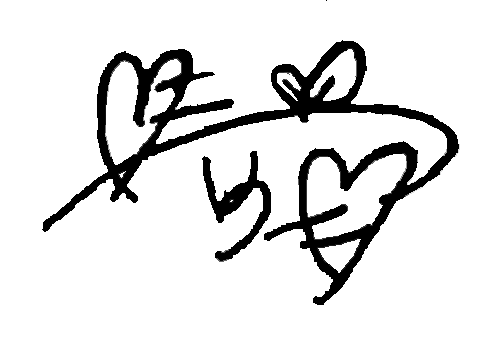

Aino Kishi (Japanese: 希志あいの, Hepburn: Kishi Aino; born February 1, 1988) is a Japanese actress, singer and former AV idol. Starting her career in 2008, Kishi starred in over 400 adult films and was named among the most popular adult film actresses of her generation, with her popularity crossing into mainstream acting appearances as well. She was also a member of the first generation of the idol group Ebisu Muscats between 2008 and 2013. Kishi retired from the adult film scene in December 2015 and returned into civil life.

== Life and career ==
=== Early life and AV career ===
Kishi was born on 1 February 1988 in Hokkaido, Japan. In an interview, she recalled that her first exposure to adult films was watching the popular AV idol Tina Yuzuki (Rio) at a hotel room, being stunned by her beauty and becoming fascinated with the idea of becoming an adult film actress. Kishi debuted in AV at the age of 20 on February 22, 2008, with the famed AV studio Alice Japan. Kishi's first two years as an AV actress was under an exclusive double contract under the Alice Japan and Max-A labels, but in February 2010 she transferred and made a similar double exclusivity contract with IdeaPocket and S1 No. 1. Style. Kishi performed with both studios till June, 2011 when she choose to stay with IdeaPocket, and became one of the studio's top actress till her retirement. During her tenure at IdeaPocket, Kishi formed a close friendship with other AV idols including Tina Yuzuki, Jessica Kizaki, Kaho Kasumi, Minori Hatsune and Airi Kijima. Kishi retired from AV in the end of 2015, and her retirement movie "Abayo!-Thank You Aino Kishi Retirement Special" was released on December 12, 2015.

=== Film career ===
In addition to adult videos, her career has also included roles in theatrical films, V-cinema and television. Her film credits include the mainstream ero guro Samurai Princess, in which she plays the title character and the romantic comedy Rubbers (ラバーズ〜覆う女〜, Rabāzu ~Oou onna~), about a young girl with a latex fetish and the complications this causes in her love life. One critic wrote: "Kishi is fantastic in her role" and her performance is "one of last year's most delighting ones". She also starred in the 2012 erotic action comedy Mask the Kekkou: Reborn (けっこう仮面 新生-REBORN-, Kekkō Kamen: Ribōn), where she played the superhero Kekko Kamen. In 2015, she starred in the Korean comedy film, The Maidroid. In 2015, she also starred in another Korean thriller film, Maze: Secret Love.

=== Music career ===
Kishi was a member of the Ebisu Muscats. In 2012, she took part in the music project Kiss, a J-pop group consisting of Kishi, Mayu Nozomi and Jessica Kizaki. Their debut and only album was titled Touch My S.P.O.T..

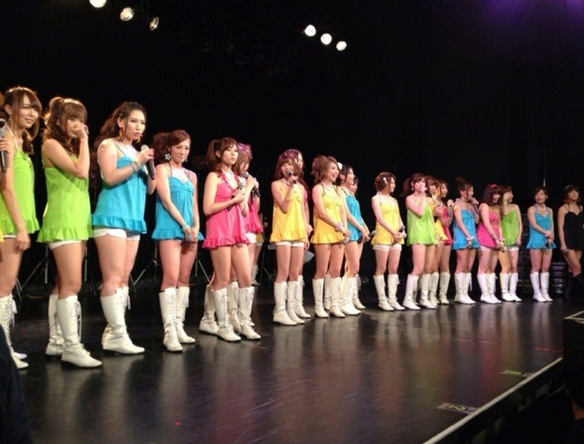
Ebisu Muscats members.

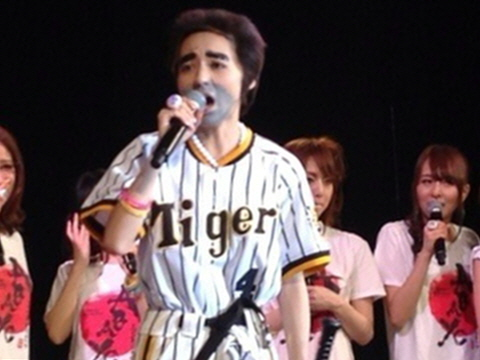
Kishi – Hanshin Tigers (cosplay).

=== Other works ===
In December 2011, a video game, "Aino Kishi Slot Game", was launched for the Android operating system with Kishi as the main character.

Through IdeaPocket's working relationship with Union Pro, Kishi made her professional wrestling debut on May 3, 2013, at the promotion's event at Korakuen Hall. After Hiroshi Fukuda had become the inaugural World Aipoke Champion, Kishi slapped him and then pinned him to become the second World Aipoke Champion.

== Filmography ==
- Samurai Princess (2009)
- Rubbers (2010)
- The Maidroid (2015)
- Maze: Secret Love (2015)

== Bibliography ==
- Jirashi sekkusu (焦らしセックス) (2009) ISBN 9784584122532

== Championships and accomplishments ==
- Union Pro Wrestling

- World Aipoke Championship (1 time)
