= Rika Kawamura =

Japanese model, actress, and gravure idol

- Born: October 10, 1982 (age 43); Tokyo, Japan
- Height: 163 cm (5 ft 4 in)
- Children: 1

Rika Kawamura (川村りか, Kawamura Rika; born October 10, 1982) is a Japanese model, actress, and gravure idol.

== Life and career ==
Kawamura was born in Tokyo on October 10, 1982. She has appeared in numerous bikini and lingerie magazines, commercial and print-ads, calendars and TV shows, and she has also released several gravure videos and photobooks.

Kawamura appeared in the 2008 film Umeda Yūko no kokuhaku as a friend of the main character, but her first starring role was in the March 2010 erotic suspense film S&M The Movie (=ＳとＭ 劇場版) which was directed by Yutaka Ōgi.

She also starred in the 2009 V-cinema production Chanbara Beauty: The Movie - Vortex.

She was a member of the Ebisu Muscats.

She gave birth to a baby boy in 2016.

On April 17, 2018, Kawamura announced on her blog that she has cervical cancer and will be undergoing surgery.

== Filmography ==
- Umeda Yūko no kokuhaku (梅田優子の告白) (October 2008)
- Beautiful Female Panther: Body Sniper (美しき女豹 BODY SNIPER, Utsukushiki mehyõ: Body sniper) (March 2010)
- S&M The Movie (=ＳとＭ 劇場版) (March 2010)
- Wasurerarenai ano natsu (忘れられない、あの夏) (October 2010)
- Step Up Love Story: Triple Love and Love Forever (映画版 ふたりエッチ トリプル・ラブ＆ラブ・フォーエバー) (May 2012)
