= Mother Is a Whore =

- Film poster
- Hangul: 엄마는 창녀다
- RR: Eommaneun changnyeoda
- MR: Ŏmmanŭn ch'angnyŏda
- Directed by: Lee Sang-woo
- Screenplay by: Lee Sang-woo
- Produced by: Mo Hyun-shin; Choi Phil-sun
- Starring: Lee Sang-woo; Lee Yong-nyeo; Kwan Bum-tack
- Cinematography: Cho Young-jik
- Release dates: May 2009 (Kyoto); March 31, 2011 (South Korea)
- Running time: 96 minutes
- Country: South Korea
- Language: Korean

Mother Is a Whore (Korean: 엄마는 창녀다; RR: Eommaneun changnyeoda) is a 2009 South Korean drama film written and directed by South Korean indie provocateur Lee Sang-woo. It is based on a true story in Korea where a man was using his mother as a whore.

The film premiered at the 2009 Kyoto International Student Film Festival.

== Synopsis ==
Sang-woo (Lee Sang-woo), who is HIV-positive, lives with his 60-year-old mother (Lee Yong-nyeo) in a small hut. Abandoned by his father Jung-il (Kwan Bum-tack) who left his mother for a younger woman, Sang-woo has no choice but to work as a pimp to his beloved mother to make a living.

== Cast ==
- Lee Sang-woo as Sang-woo
- Lee Yong-nyeo as Sang-woo's mother
- Kwan Bum-tack as Jung-il, Sang-soo's father
- Yoo Ae-kyung as Jo Hee-soo
- Jeong Tae-won as Jo Hee-cheol

== Reception ==
Hangul Celluloid's Paul Quinn: "With its intelligently written and deftly executed narrative, Mother Is a Whore serves not only as a searing, bleak and unsettling tale but also as an in-depth critique of the concept of family."
