= List of South Korean films of 2014 =

This is a list of South Korean films that received a domestic theatrical release in 2014.

== Box office ==
The highest-grossing South Korean films released in 2014, by domestic box office gross revenue, are as follows:

Highest-grossing films released in 2014
Rank	Title	Distributor	Domestic gross
1	The Admiral: Roaring Currents	CJ Entertainment	$110,371,725
2	Ode to My Father	CJ Entertainment	$90,198,588
3	The Pirates	Lotte Cultureworks	$53,961,090
4	Miss Granny	CJ Entertainment	$50,992,288
5	My Love, Don't Cross That River	CGV Art House & Daemyung Culture Factory	$30,372,598
6	Kundo: Age of the Rampant	Showbox	$30,073,491
7	Tazza: The Hidden Card	Lotte Cultureworks	$26,319,611
8	The Fatal Encounter	Lotte Cultureworks	$24,304,904
9	The Divine Move	Showbox	$23,424,413
10	A Hard Day	Showbox	$21,957,467

== Released ==
Released	English title	Korean title	Director	Cast	Admissions	Ref.
1 January	Wet Dreams - Girl from the Dreams	몽정애 - 꿈속의 여인	Lee Young-hwa	Lee Min-woo, Yoon Bo-ri		
2 January	Animal	청춘예찬	Choi Jong-woon	Kim Nam-hee, Kang Yu-mi	85	
9 January	The Plan Man	플랜맨	Seong Si-heub	Jung Jae-young, Han Ji-min	632,303	
9 January	Yoon Hee	윤희		Choi Ji-yeon, Hwang Seok-jung	500	
15 January	Murderer	살인자	Lee Ki-wook	Ma Dong-seok, Ahn Do-gyu, Kim Hyun-soo	88,199	
16 January	Hype Nation 3D	하이프네이션: 힙합사기꾼	Park Hyung-woo	Daniel Shin, Jay Park, Crown J	3,792	
16 January	Taste	맛		Jung Hyun-woo, Yoo Da-eun	5,021	
16 January	Virgin Theory: 7 Steps to Get on the Top	한 번도 안 해본 여자	Ahn Cheol-ho	Hwang Woo-seul-hye, Sa Hee	9,582	
22 January	Hot Young Bloods	피끓는 청춘	Lee Yeon-woo	Park Bo-young, Lee Jong-suk	1,676,040	
22 January	Man in Love	남자가 사랑할 때	Han Dong-wook	Hwang Jung-min, Han Hye-jin	1,979,311	
22 January	Miss Granny	수상한 그녀	Hwang Dong-hyuk	Shim Eun-kyung, Na Moon-hee	8,632,239	
23 January	The Dinner	만찬	Kim Dong-hyun	Jung Yi-kap, Park Se-jin	1,669	
23 January	Stray Dogs	들개들	Ha Won-joon	Kim Jeong-hoon, Cha Ji-heon	1,144	
29 January	The Huntresses	조선미녀삼총사	Park Jae-hyun	Ha Ji-won, Kang Ye-won	480,361	
30 January	My Place	마이 플레이스	Park Moon-chil		1,810	
6 February	Another Promise	또 하나의 약속	Kim Tae-yun	Park Chul-min	495,971	
13 February	Apostle	신이 보낸 사람	Kim Jin-moo	Kim In-kwon, Hong Kyung-in	417,371	
13 February	Ordinary Days	별일 아니다	Kim Sang-seok	Kim Sang-seok, Kim Eun-joo		
13 February	Secret Tutor	비밀과외	Mr. L	Yoon Sang-doo, Ye Rin	1,590	
13 February	Venus Talk	관능의 법칙	Kwon Chil-in	Uhm Jung-hwa, Moon So-ri, Jo Min-su	780,798	
20 February	December	디셈버	Park Jeong-hoon	Shin Myung-jin, Kim Dong-won		
20 February	House with a Good View - Tasty Sex	전망좋은 하우스 - 맛있는 섹스	Mr. L	Yoon Bo-ri, Kim Ji-won		
20 February	The Satellite Girl and Milk Cow	우리별 일호와 얼룩소	Jang Hyung-yoon	Jung Yu-mi, Yoo Ah-in	43,469	
20 February	Tabloid Truth	찌라시: 위험한 소문	Kim Kwang-sik	Kim Kang-woo, Jung Jin-young	1,221,207	
27 February	The Actress Is Too Much	여배우는 너무해	Yoo Jung-hwan	Cha Ye-ryun, Jo Hyun-jae	2,042	
27 February	Anxiety	미스터 컴퍼니	Min Hwan-ki			
27 February	Lebanon Emotion	레바논 감정	Jung Young-heun	Choi Sung-ho, Jang Won-young	888	
6 March	The Empire of Shame	탐욕의 제국	Hong Ri-kyung		3,862	
6 March	Intruders	조난자들	Noh Young-seok	Jeon Seok-ho, Oh Tae-kyung	12,948	
6 March	Manshin: Ten Thousand Spirits	리턴매치	Park Chan-kyong	Moon So-ri, Ryu Hyun-kyung, Kim Sae-ron	29,699	
6 March	Return Match	리턴매치	Kim Yong-wan, Seon Jong-hoon	Lee Ji-hoon, Jung Yeon-joo		
9 March	Finally	파이널리	Im Hyung-joo	Song Jae-hee, Seo Eun-chae		
13 March	Miss Call	나가요미스콜	Han Dong-ho	Choi Jong-hoon, Han Gyu-ri		
13 March	Monster	몬스터	Hwang In-ho	Lee Min-ki, Kim Go-eun	512,715	
13 March	Thread of Lies	우아한 거짓말	Lee Han	Kim Hee-ae, Go Ah-sung	1,158,227	
13 March	Two Wives	두 아내	Lee Soong-hwan	Go Eun-chong, Son Mi-hee	8,314	
14 March	Glorious Days	화창한 그날들	Bang Hyeon-joon	Kim Dong-ha, Lee Mi-ae	310	
20 March	Go, Stop, Murder	고스톱 살인	Kim Joon-kwon	Lee Seung-joon, Kim Hong-pa		
20 March	Total Messed Family	오빠가 돌아왔다	No Zin-soo	Son Byong-ho, Kim Min-ki		
27 March	A Case of Bachelor Abduction	청춘학당: 풍기문란 보쌈 야사	Gu Mo	Lee Min-ho, Bae Seul-ki		
27 March	See, Beethoven	씨, 베토벤	Min Bok-gi, Park Jin-soon	Kim So-jin, Gong Sang-ah		
27 March	Sketch	스케치	Lee Hyeok-jong	Go Eun-ah, Park Jae-jung		
27 March	The Taste of an Affair	불륜의 맛	Lee Se-il	Kim Ji-won, Jeon Ryeo-won		
3 April	Mr. Perfect	백프로	Kim Myung-kyun	Yoon Shi-yoon, Yeo Jin-goo		
3 April	Tinker Ticker	들개	Kim Jung-hoon	Byun Yo-han, Park Jung-min		
10 April	Broken	방황하는 칼날	Lee Jeong-ho	Jung Jae-young, Lee Sung-min		
10 April	Girls, Girls, Girls	녀녀녀	Han Seung-rim	Shin Joo-ah, Koo Ji-sung		
10 April	Godsend	신의 선물	Moon Si-hyun	Lee Eun-woo, Jeon Soo-jin		
10 April	Guardian	보호자	Yoo Won-sang	Kim Su-hyeon, Go Seo-hee		
10 April	Innocent Thing	가시	Kim Tae-kyun	Jang Hyuk, Jo Bo-ah		
10 April	Let's Go to Rose Motel 2 - Thirst	가자! 장미여관으로 2	Kim Bong-eun	Hwang Jung-ah, Im So-mi		
10 April	My Boy	마이보이	Jeon Kyu-hwan	Lee Tae-ran, Cha In-pyo		
17 April	God's Eye View	시선	Lee Chang-ho	Oh Kwang-rok, Nam Dong-ha, Seo Eun-chae		
17 April	Han Gong-ju	한공주	Lee Su-jin	Chun Woo-hee		
17 April	KaTalk Project	카토 프로젝트	Kim Jeong-wook			
17 April	The Legacy	이쁜 것들이 되어라	Han Seung-hoon	Jung Gyu-woon, Yoon Seung-ah		
17 April	Make Your Move 3D	메이크 유어 무브	Duane Adler	Derek Hough, BoA		
17 April	Uigwe, the 8-Day Festival 3D	의궤, 8일간의 축제 3D	Choi Pil-gon	Yeo Jin-goo (narrator)		
24 April	10 Minutes	10분	Lee Yong-seung	Baek Jong-hwan, Kim Jong-gu		
24 April	Melo	멜로	Roy Lee	Kim Hye-na, Lee Seon-ho		
24 April	My Father's Emails	아버지의 이메일	Hong Jae-hee			
24 April	Shuttlecock	셔틀콕	Lee Yoo-bin	Lee Joo-seung, Kong Ye-ji		
30 April	The Fatal Encounter	역린	Lee Jae-kyoo	Hyun Bin, Jung Jae-young, Jo Jung-suk		
30 April	The Target	표적	Chang (Yoon Hong-seung)	Ryu Seung-ryong, Lee Jin-wook, Yoo Jun-sang		
14 May	Obsessed	인간중독	Kim Dae-woo	Song Seung-heon, Lim Ji-yeon		
15 May	Campus S Couple	캠퍼스 S 커플	Song Chang-yong	Choi Phillip, Moon Bo-ryung, Seo Hyo-myung, Park Ran		
15 May	Mad Sad Bad	신촌좀비만화	Ryoo Seung-wan, Han Ji-seung, Kim Tae-yong	("Ghost") Lee David, Park Jung-min, Son Soo-hyun, Kwak Do-won ("I Saw You") Park Ki-woong, Nam Gyu-ri ("Picnic") Kim Soo-an, Park Mi-hyun		
15 May	Sage Solutions	슬기로운 해법	Tae Jun-seek			
22 May	Ghost Messenger	고스트 메신저	Gu Bong-ho	Eun Jeong, Park Seong-tae		
22 May	A Girl at My Door	도희야	July Jung	Bae Doona, Kim Sae-ron, Song Sae-byeok		
22 May	The Groin	배꼽과 무릎사이	Lee Soong-hwan	Heo Dong-won, Jeong Ho-joon, Bori		
22 May	Mizo	미조	Nam Ki-woong	Lee Hyo, Yoon Dong-hwan		
22 May	One on One	일대일	Kim Ki-duk	Ma Dong-seok, Lee Yi-kyung, Kim Young-min		
29 May	Genome Hazard	무명인	Kim Sung-su	Hidetoshi Nishijima, Kim Hyo-jin		
29 May	A Hard Day	끝까지 간다	Kim Seong-hun	Lee Sun-kyun, Cho Jin-woong		
29 May	One Summer Night	인생은 새옹지마	Kim Tae-yong	Ko Kyung-pyo, Lee Cho-hee, Ahn Jae-min		
29 May	Rosa	로사 이야기	Maeng Gwan-pyo	Dayana Ruzmetova, Jo Ha-seok		
29 May	A Touch of Unseen	귀접	Lee Hyun-chul	Lee Eon-jeong, Park Soo-in		
29 May	Young Mother 2	젊은 엄마 2	Noh Seong-soo	Cha Soon-hyeong, So Yoon		
4 June	Man on High Heels	하이힐	Jang Jin	Cha Seung-won, Oh Jung-se		
4 June	No Tears for the Dead	우는 남자	Lee Jeong-beom	Jang Dong-gun, Kim Min-hee		
5 June	Ready Action! Violence Movies	레디 액션! 폭력영화	Jung Jae-woong, Choe Won-kyung, Kim Do-kyoung	("Min-ho Is Unbeatable") Min Ho-yul ("Making Film") Oh Sung-geun ("My Fight") Jang Cheol-min		
12 June	An American Friend	미국인 친구	Sung Ji-hye	Nam Sung-jin, Hwang Geum-hee, Bae Jung-hwa		
12 June	For the Emperor	황제를 위하여	Park Sang-jun	Lee Min-ki, Park Sung-woong		
12 June	Gyeongju	경주	Zhang Lu	Park Hae-il, Shin Min-a		
12 June	The Stone	스톤	Cho Se-rae	Cho Dong-in, Kim Roi-ha, Park Won-sang		
12 June	You Are My Vampire	그댄 나의 뱀파이어	Lee Won-hoi	Choi Yoon-young, Park Jeong-sik		
19 June	The Actress Spy	여배우 공작단	Jeon Tae-yoon	Lee Ja-eun, Heo Dong-won, Lee Jeong-hoon		
26 June	Futureless Things	이것이 우리의 끝이다	Kim Kyung-mook	Yoo Young, Gong Young		
26 June	Let's Dance	자, 이제 댄스타임	Jo Se-young	Park Ji-hye, Song Sam-dong		
26 June	Winter Garden	프랑스인 김명실	Lee Ji-hyun			
3 July	Black Deal	블랙딜	Lee Hoon-kyu			
3 July	The Divine Move	신의 한수	Jo Bum-gu	Jung Woo-sung, Lee Beom-soo		
3 July	Mizo	미조	Nam Ki-woong	Yoon Dong-hwan, Shin So-mi		
3 July	Mourning Grave	소녀괴담	Oh In-chun	Kang Ha-neul, Kim So-eun		
3 July	Navigation	내비게이션	Jang Kwon-ho	Hwang Bo-ra, Tak Teu-in, Kim Jun-ho		
3 July	One Night Only	원나잇온리	Kim Jho Kwang-soo, Kim Tae-yong	("One Night") Yoo Min-kyu, Jeong Won-jo ("Night Bug") Park Soo-jin, Jo Bok-rae		
9 July	Desirable Taste	그 참을 수 없는 맛	Lee Ji-hyeong	Jo Moon-joo, Kim Seon-wool		
10 July	Confession	좋은 친구들	Lee Do-yun	Ji Sung, Ju Ji-hoon, Lee Kwang-soo		
10 July	I Like Sexy Women	나는 야한 여자가 좋다	Shin Jung-kyun	Kim Tae-han, Seo Ri-seul		
10 July	Sookhee	숙희	Yang Ji-eun	Chae Min-seo, Jo Han-cheol		
16 July	Her Addiction	중독애	Han So-joon	Kim So-ra, Kwak Jin		
17 July	Non-Fiction Diary	논픽션 다이어리	Jung Yoon-suk			
17 July	Santa Barbara	산타바바라	David Cho	Lee Sang-yoon, Yoon Jin-seo		
23 July	Kundo: Age of the Rampant	군도:민란의 시대	Yoon Jong-bin	Ha Jung-woo, Kang Dong-won		
23 July	Passionate Love	열애	Lee Soong-hwan	Jeong Min, Oh Soo-min, Han Cho-ah		
24 July	Affair	밀애	Kim In-gyoo, Kim Min-joon	Yoo Ra-seong, Hwang Bo-wook		
24 July	Our Family	우리가족	Kim Do-hyun			
30 July	The Admiral: Roaring Currents	명량-회오리바다	Kim Han-min	Choi Min-sik, Ryu Seung-ryong		
31 July	Haru	관계	Kim Myeong-seo	Kim Kyeong-ik, Jin Hye-kyeong		
31 July	The Suffered	피해자들	No Zin-soo	Ryu Tae-joon, Jang Eun-ah		
6 August	The Pirates	해적: 바다로 간 산적	Lee Seok-hoon	Kim Nam-gil, Son Ye-jin		
6 August	Resolve	떡	Lee Yeong-in	Choo Seon, Kim Ji-ah		
7 August	The Cardinal	그 사람 추기경	Jeon Seong-woo	Stephen Kim Sou-hwan		
7 August	Super Virgin	숫호구	Back Seung-kee	Back Seung-kee, Jo Han-cheol		
7 August	T-Pang Rescue	극장판 뛰뛰빵빵 구조대 미션: 둥둥이를 구하라!	Bang Hyung-woo			
13 August	Haemoo	해무	Shim Sung-bo	Park Yoochun, Kim Yoon-seok		
14 August	18 - Eighteen Noir	18: 우리들의 성장 느와르	Han Yun-sun	Lee Jae-eung, Cha Yeop		
14 August	Hope in Baseco	바세코의 아이들	Kim Kyeong-sik			
14 August	Insect Kingdom 3D	곤충왕국 3D	Kim Jeong-min, Kim Jin-man			
14 August	Janus: Two Faces of Desire	야누스: 욕망의 두 얼굴	Son Young-ho	Oh In-hye, Lee Eun-mi		
20 August	Tunnel 3D	터널 3D	Park Gyu-taek	Jeong Yu-mi, Yeon Woo-jin		
21 August	The King of Jokgu	족구왕	Woo Moon-gi	Ahn Jae-hong, Hwang Seung-eon		
21 August	My Ordinary Love Story	내 연애의 기억	Lee Kwon	Kang Ye-won, Song Sae-byeok		
21 August	The Road Called Life	메밀꽃, 운수 좋은 날, 그리고 봄봄	Ahn Jae-hoon, Han Hye-jin	Jang Gwang, Ryu Hyun-kyung		
21 August	The Story of Ong-nyeo	옹녀뎐	Kyeong Seok-ho	Han Chae-yoo, Kang Kyeong-woo		
21 August	Welcome	왓니껴	Lee Dong-sam	Shim Hye-jin, Jeon No-min		
27 August	Haru	관계	Kim Myeong-soo	Kim Kyeong-ik, Jin Hye-kyeong		
28 August	Night Flight	야간비행	Leesong Hee-il	Kwak Si-yang, Lee Jae-joon		
28 August	Pick Up Artist	픽업 아티스트	Jun Do-han	Park Yong-beom, Choi Ho-joong		
3 September	My Brilliant Life	두근두근 내 인생	E J-yong	Kang Dong-won, Song Hye-kyo		
3 September	Tazza: The Hidden Card	타짜: 신의 손	Kang Hyeong-cheol	Choi Seung-hyun, Shin Se-kyung		
4 September	Golden Chariot in the Sky	하늘의 황금마차	O Muel	Kim Dong-ho, Moon Seok-beom		
4 September	Hill of Freedom	자유의 언덕	Hong Sang-soo	Ryo Kase, Moon So-ri		
11 September	A Record of Sweet Murder	원 컷 - 어느 친절한 살인자의 기록	Kōji Shiraishi	Yeon Je-wook, Kim Kkot-bi, Tsukasa Aoi, Ryotaro Yonemura		
11 September	The Wicked	마녀	Yoo Young-sun	Park Ju-hee, Na Soo-yoon		
11 September	Wrestling	레쓰링	Kim Ho-joon	Choi Sung-kook, Song Eun-chae, Ha Na-kyeong		
17 September	Dangerous Seduction - There's Only Loneliness Where Memories Lie	위험한 유혹 - 추억이 떠나면 외로움만 남는다	Lee Sang-hwa	Choo Seon, Han Chang-hyeon		
17 September	Food Chain	먹이사슬	Han Dong-ho	Yoon Seol-hee, Kim Min-hyeok		
18 September	One for All, All for One	60만번의 트라이	Park Sa-yu, Park Don-sa	Moon Jeong-hee (narrator)		
18 September	The Plan	설계	Park Chang-jin	Shin Eun-kyung, Kang Ji-sub, Oh In-hye		
25 September	9 Muses of Star Empire	나인뮤지스; 그녀들의 서바이벌	Lee Hark-joon			
25 September	A Fresh Girl	청아	Kim Jung-ho	Kim Se-in, Bang Seong-ho		
25 September	A Pharisee	바리새인	Jung Young-bae	Ye Hak-young, Jo Min-a		
25 September	Splendid but Sad Days	순천	Lee Hong-ki			
25 September	Toxic Desire: Addiction	욕망의 독: 중독	Yoon Yeo-chang	Hong Kyeong-in, Kim Seon-young		
25 September	Zombie School	좀비스쿨	Kim Seok-jung	Baek Seo-bin, Ha Eun-seol		
1 October	I Like Sexy Women 2	나는 야한 여자가 좋다 2	Kim Bong-eun	Seol Hyo-joo, Bae Geon-sik		
2 October	Jungle Shuffle	정글히어로	Park Tae-dong, Mauricio De la Orta	Drake Bell, Rob Schneider, Jessica DiCicco		
2 October	Mizo	미조	Nam Ki-woong	Lee Hyo, Yoon Dong-hwan		
2 October	Scarlet Innocence	마담 뺑덕	Yim Pil-sung	Jung Woo-sung, Esom		
2 October	Slow Video	슬로우 비디오	Kim Young-tak	Cha Tae-hyun, Nam Sang-mi		
2 October	Whistle Blower	제보자	Yim Soon-rye	Park Hae-il, Yoo Yeon-seok		
8 October	Let's Go to Rose Motel 3 - Wandering	가자! 장미여관으로 3 - 방황	Kim Bong-eun	Seo Yeon-joo, Lee Jong-joon		
8 October	Manhole	맨홀	Shin Jae-young	Jung Kyung-ho, Jung Yu-mi, Kim Sae-ron		
8 October	My Love, My Bride	나의 사랑 나의 신부	Im Chan-sang	Jo Jung-suk, Shin Min-a		
16 October	Compassion	천 번을 불러도	Shin Sung-sub	Kim Choi-yong, Lee Cheong-mi		
16 October	Hwang Gu	황구	Park Yong-jib	Ji-min, Kwon So-hyun, Park Hee-geon		
16 October	Where's Satomi?	사토미를 찾아라	New Pistol	Satomi Yuria, Kwak Han-gu		
22 October	Lies 2014	거짓말 2014	Lee Min-hwan	Yoon Seol-hee, Hong Seok-yeon		
23 October	Red Carpet	레드카펫	Park Beom-soo	Yoon Kye-sang, Go Joon-hee		
23 October	The Truth Shall Not Sink with Sewol	다이빙벨	Ahn Hae-ryong, Lee Sang-ho			
23 October	We Are Brothers	우리는 형제입니다	Jang Jin	Cho Jin-woong, Kim Sung-kyun		
29 October	The Woman Upstairs	위층여자	Lee Chan-wook	Yuri Seo, Park Won-bin		
30 October	The Disciple John Oak	제자, 옥한흠	Kim Sang-cheol	Kwon Oh-joong, Sung Yu-ri (narrators)		
30 October	Fantasy	환상	Lee Soong-hwan	Park Jae-hoon, Noh Soo-ram		
30 October	Love Affair	정사	Kim Jung-hwan	Han Se-ah, Ryu Seong-hyeon		
30 October	My Dictator	나의 독재자	Lee Hae-jun	Sul Kyung-gu, Park Hae-il		
30 October	Romance in Seoul	서울연애	Cho Hyun-chul, Choi Si-hyung, Lee Jeong-hong, Jung Jae-hoon, Lee Woo-jung, Jung Hyuk-ki, Kim Tae-yong	Park Joo-hee, Koo Kyo-hwan		
30 October	Tuning Fork	소리굽쇠	Choo Sang-rok	Jo An, Kim Min-sang		
6 November	Daughter	다우더	Ku Hye-sun	Ku Hye-sun, Shim Hye-jin		
6 November	Entangled	현기증	Lee Don-ku	Kim Young-ae, Do Ji-won, Song Il-gook, Kim So-eun		
6 November	Fashion King	패션왕	Oh Ki-hwan	Joo Won, Sulli, Ahn Jae-hyun, Park Se-young, Kim Sung-oh		
6 November	Fire in Hell	지옥화	Lee Sang-woo	Won Tae-hee, Cha Seung-min		
6 November	Glory for Everyone	누구에게나 찬란한	Lim Yu-cheol	Kim Nam-gil (narrator)		
13 November	Cart	카트	Boo Ji-young	Yum Jung-ah, Moon Jeong-hee		
13 November	A Dream of Iron	철의 꿈	Kelvin Kyung Kun Park			
13 November	Set Me Free	거인	Kim Tae-yong	Choi Woo-shik, Kim Su-hyeon		
13 November	The Youth	레디액션 청춘	Kim Jin-moo, Kim Ji-mook, Ju Seong-su, Park Ga-hee, Jung Won-sik	("The Rumor") Lee Donghae, Woorin ("Going Out") Ari ("Enemies All Around") Song Seung-hyun ("Wonderwall") Goo Won, Nam Ji-hyun ("Play Girl") Seo Eun-ah		
20 November	Dad for Rent	아빠를 빌려드립니다	Kim Deok-su	Kim Sang-kyung, Moon Jeong-hee		
20 November	He Who Loves the World	그 사람 그 사랑 그 세상	Kwon Hyeok-man	Kang Seok-woo, Lee Kwang-gi, Choi Kang-hee (narrators)		
20 November	Late Spring	봄	Cho Geun-hyun	Park Yong-woo, Kim Seo-hyung, Lee Yoo-young		
20 November	Mot	못	Seo Ho-bin	Ho Hyo-hoon, Kang Bong-seong, Lee Paul		
27 November	Big Match	빅매치	Choi Ho	Lee Jung-jae, Shin Ha-kyun		
27 November	My Love, Don't Cross That River	님아, 그 강을 건너지 마오	Jin Mo-young	Jo Byeong-man, Kang Kye-yeol		
27 November	Thuy	안녕, 투이	Kim Jae-han	Ninh Dương Lan Ngọc, Myung Gye-nam		
27 November	The Way to School	학교 가는길	Lee Kyung-mook, Goo Joong-hee	Dolka, Kenlub, Rikjin Angboo, Norboo, Chiring Boonchok		
4 December	A Dynamite Family	덕수리5형제	Jeon Hyung-jun	Yoon Sang-hyun, Song Sae-byeok, Lee Ah-i, Hwang Chansung, Kim Ji-min, Lee Kwang-soo		
4 December	GROW: Infinite's Real Youth Life	GROW: 인피니트의 리얼 청춘 라이프	Kim Jin-soo	Infinite		
4 December	Highway Stars	악사들	Kim Ji-gon	Udambara		
4 December	The Hospice	목숨	Lee Chang-jae			
4 December	Men and Women	춘하추동 로맨스	Oh Chang-min	Lee Eung-jae, Choi Eun-ah		
4 December	My Sister	울언니	Lee Je-rak	Oh Kwang-rok, Hwang Geum-hee, Yang Ha-eun, Kim Kyoul		
10 December	Quo Vadis	쿼바디스	Kim Jae-hwan	Lee Jong-yoon, Ahn Suk-hwan, Nam Myeong-ryeol		
11 December	51+	파티51	Jung Yong-taek			
11 December	Mulberry 2014	뽕2014	Kong Ja-kwan	Kim Yeon-soo, Lee Ri-na		
11 December	Pororo, The Snow Fairy Village Adventure	뽀로로 극장판 눈요정 마을 대모험	Kim Hyun-ho	Lee Sun, Ham Su-jung, Hong So-yeong, Lee Mi-ja, Jung Mi-suk, Kim Hwan-chin		
11 December	Shinhwa Live 3D: The Legend Continues	신화 라이브 3D 더 레전드 컨티뉴스	Son Seok	Shinhwa		
17 December	Ode to My Father	국제시장	Yoon Je-kyoon	Hwang Jung-min, Yunjin Kim, Oh Dal-su		
18 December	The 4th Innovator	제4 이노베이터	Han Myeong-gu	Jeon Joo-yeon, Dokgo Young-jae		
18 December	Awaiting	민우씨 오는 날	Kang Je-gyu	Moon Chae-won, Go Soo		
18 December	Change Zoororing	쥬로링 동물탐정 극장판	Choi Jeong-guk	Kim Seo-yeong, Moon Nam-sook		
18 December	Ensemble	앙상블	Lee Jong-pil	Hwang Jung-min, Yunjin Kim, Oh Dal-su		
18 December	A Rented Room in Heaven	천국의 셋방	Kim Jae-soo	Oh Seong-tae, Ha Hee-kyeong		
24 December	The Con Artists	기술자들	Kim Hong-sun	Kim Woo-bin, Lee Hyun-woo, Ko Chang-seok		
24 December	The Royal Tailor	상의원	Lee Won-suk	Han Suk-kyu, Go Soo, Park Shin-hye, Yoo Yeon-seok		
31 December	How to Steal a Dog	개를 훔치는 완벽한 방법	Kim Sung-ho	Lee Re, Kim Hye-ja, Kang Hye-jung, Choi Min-soo, Lee Chun-hee		
31 December	The Tenor – Lirico Spinto	더 테너 리리코 스핀토	Kim Sang-man	Yoo Ji-tae, Cha Ye-ryun, Yūsuke Iseya		
