= List of South Korean films of 2012 =

This is a list of South Korean films that received a domestic theatrical release in 2012.

== Box office ==
The highest-grossing South Korean films released in 2012, by domestic box office gross revenue, are as follows:

Highest-grossing films released in 2012
Rank	Title	Distributor	Domestic gross
1	The Thieves	Showbox	$76,125,446
2	Masquerade	CJ Entertainment	$72,257,849
3	A Werewolf Boy	CJ Entertainment	$37,866,570
4	The Tower	CJ Entertainment	$30,602,201
5	Nameless Gangster: Rules of the Time	Showbox	$29,696,040
6	The Grand Heist	Next Entertainment World	$28,130,614
7	All About My Wife	Megabox Plus M	$27,813,464
8	Deranged	CJ Entertainment	$26,149,168
9	Architecture 101	Lotte Cultureworks	$24,577,475
10	Dancing Queen	CJ Entertainment	$24,486,612

== Released ==
Released	English title	Korean title	Director	Cast	Ref.
5 January	Wonderful Radio	원더풀 라디오	Kwon Chil-in	Lee Min-jung, Lee Jung-jin	
12 January	Jesus Hospital	밍크코트	Lee Sang-cheol, Shin A-ga	Hwang Jeong-min, Kim Mi-hyang, Han Song-hee	
12 January	The Outback	코알라 키드: 영웅의 탄생	Lee Kyung-ho	(Korean dubbed) Lee Taemin, Sunny	
18 January	Dancing Queen	댄싱 퀸	Lee Seok-hoon	Uhm Jung-hwa, Hwang Jung-min	
18 January	Never Ending Story	네버 엔딩 스토리	Jung Yong-ju	Uhm Tae-woong, Jung Ryeo-won	
18 January	Pacemaker	페이스메이커	Kim Dal-joong	Kim Myung-min, Ahn Sung-ki, Go Ara	
18 January	Unbowed	부러진 화살	Chung Ji-young	Ahn Sung-ki, Park Won-sang	
26 January	Speckles: The Tarbosaurus	점박이: 한반도의 공룡	Han Sang-ho	Lee Hyung-suk, Shin Yong-woo, Gu Ja-hyeong	
1 February	Papa	파파	Han Ji-seung	Park Yong-woo, Go Ara	
2 February	Nameless Gangster: Rules of the Time	범죄와의 전쟁	Yoon Jong-bin	Choi Min-sik, Ha Jung-woo	
2 February	2 Lines	두 개의 선	Jimin		
16 February	Howling	하울링	Yoo Ha	Song Kang-ho, Lee Na-young	
23 February	The Angel's Breath	천사의 숨소리	Han Ji-won	Kim Yeong-seon, Han Ji-won	
23 February	Bolts and Blip	볼츠와 블립	Peter Lepeniotis	(Korean dubbed) Kim Il, Choi Jeong-ho	
29 February	Comic Book Store 3D	만화방3D	Heo Jae-hyeong	Lee Eun-mi, Jung Yi-kyul	
29 February	Love Fiction	러브픽션	Jeon Kye-soo	Ha Jung-woo, Gong Hyo-jin	
29 February	Welcome Back to the Beast Airline 3D	비스트 앵콜 콘서트 3D	Son Seok	Beast	
1 March	Hoya (Eighteen and Nineteen)	열여덟,열아홉	Bae Kwang-su	Yoo Yeon-seok, Baek Jin-hee	
1 March	Stateless Things	줄탁동시	Kim Kyung-mook	Lee Paul, Yeom Hyun-joon	
8 March	Choked	가시	Kim Joong-hyeon	Uhm Tae-goo, Park Se-jin, Kil Hae-yeon	
8 March	The Dearest	은실이	Kim Sun-ah, Park Se-hee	Hwang Eun-jin, Han Hyo-jeong	
8 March	Helpless	화차	Byun Young-joo	Kim Min-hee, Lee Sun-kyun, Jo Sung-ha	
8 March	Mirage	밀월도 가는 길	Yang Jung-ho	Moon Jeong-woong, Shin Jae-seung, Kim Tae-yoon	
8 March	Romance Joe	로맨스 조	Lee Kwang-kuk	Kim Young-pil, Shin Dong-mi, Lee David, Lee Chae-eun	
8 March	Sympathy for Us	태어나서 미안해	Choi Young-seok	Im Joon-sik, Im Chae-seon, Kim Sang-ho	
8 March	Talking Architect	말하는 건축가	Jeong Jae-eun	Chung Guyon	
15 March	The Beat Goes On	청춘 그루브	Byun Sung-hyun	Bong Tae-gyu, Lee Yeong-hoon, Kwak Ji-min	
15 March	Gabi	가비	Chang Yoon-hyun	Kim So-yeon, Joo Jin-mo, Park Hee-soon	
15 March	Home Sweet Home	홈 스위트 홈	Moon Si-hyun	Kim Young-hoon, Yoo Ae-kyung	
15 March	Pink	핑크	Jeon Soo-il	Lee Seung-yeon, Seo Gap-sook	
22 March	Architecture 101	건축학개론	Lee Yong-ju	Uhm Tae-woong, Han Ga-in, Lee Je-hoon, Bae Suzy	
22 March	Hand in Hand	해로 - 偕老	Choi Jong-tae	Joo Hyun, Ye Soo-jung	
22 March	Love Call	러브콜	Kim Sam-ryeok	Cha Soo-yeon, Yang Jin-woo, Choi Yu-hwa	
22 March	Planet of Snail	달팽이의 별	Yi Seung-jun	Cho Young-chan, Kim Soon-ho	
29 March	Over My Dead Body	시체가 돌아왔다	Woo Seon-ho	Lee Beom-soo, Ryoo Seung-bum, Kim Ok-vin	
5 April	Mother	어머니	Tae Jun-seek	Lee So-sun	
11 April	Doomsday Book	인류멸망보고서	Yim Pil-sung, Kim Jee-woon	("A Brave New World") Ryoo Seung-bum, Go Joon-hee ("The Heavenly Creature") Kim Kang-woo, Kim Gyu-ri ("Happy Birthday") Jin Ji-hee, Song Sae-byeok	
11 April	The Scent	간기남	Kim Hyeong-jun	Park Hee-soon, Park Si-yeon	
19 April	Duet	듀엣	Lee Sang-bin	Go Ah-sung, James Page	
19 April	Forest of Time	시간의 숲	Song Il-gon	Park Yong-woo, Rina Takagi	
22 April	The Day	더 데이		JYJ	
26 April	48 Hours Deviation	48시간의 일탈	Lee Soong-hwan	Go Na-hye, Kim Jeong-ho	
26 April	A Muse	은교	Jung Ji-woo	Park Hae-il, Kim Go-eun, Kim Mu-yeol	
26 April	Father Is a Dog	아버지는 개다	Lee Sang-woo	Kwak Beom-taek, Lee Kwang-soo, Lee Si-ho, Kim Heon	
26 April	Red Maria	레드 마리아	Kyung-soon		
26 April	Spring, Snow	봄, 눈	Kim Tae-gyun	Yoon Suk-hwa, Im Ji-kyu, Lee Geung-young	
26 April	Tropical Manila	트로피컬 마닐라	Lee Sang-woo	Kim Su-nam, Jerald de Vera	
3 May	As One	코리아	Moon Hyun-sung	Ha Ji-won, Bae Doona	
3 May	Just Friends	저스트 프렌즈	Ahn Chul-ho	Oh Yeon-seo, Lee Yeong-hoon	
10 May	Duresori: The Voice of the East	두레소리	Cho Jung-rae	Kim Seul-ki, Jo Ah-reum	
10 May	The Strangers	이방인들	Choi Yong-suk	Han Soo-yeon, Yeo Hyun-soo	
17 May	All About My Wife	내 아내의 모든 것	Min Kyu-dong	Im Soo-jung, Lee Sun-kyun, Ryu Seung-ryong	
17 May	Granny Goes to School	할머니는 일학년	Jin Kwang-gyo	Kim Jin-goo, Shin Chae-yeon	
17 May	The Taste of Money	돈의 맛	Im Sang-soo	Kim Kang-woo, Youn Yuh-jung, Kim Hyo-jin, Baek Yoon-sik	
24 May	Children of Heaven	천국의 아이들	Park Heung-sik	Yoo Da-in, Park Ji-bin	
24 May	Hello!	안녕,하세요!	Lim Tai-hyung	Lee Sang-bong	
24 May	Monk Beopjeong's Chair	법정 스님의 의자	Im Seong-gu	Monk Beopjeong, Choi Bool-am (narration)	
24 May	U.F.O.	U.F.O.	Kong Quee-hyun	Lee Ju-seung, Jeong Young-ki, Park Sang-hyuk	
31 May	Don't Click	미확인 동영상: 절대클릭금지	Kim Tae-kyoung	Park Bo-young, Joo Won	
30 May	Runway Cop	차형사	Shin Tae-ra	Kang Ji-hwan, Sung Yu-ri	
31 May	In Another Country	다른 나라에서	Hong Sang-soo	Isabelle Huppert, Yoo Jun-sang	
31 May	Still Strange	엄마에게	Lee Hong-jae	Jang Si-won, Choi Ji-hye	
6 June	The Concubine	후궁: 제왕의 첩	Kim Dae-seung	Jo Yeo-jeong, Kim Dong-wook, Kim Min-jun	
7 June	Super Star	슈퍼스타	Lim Jin-sun	Kim Jung-tae, Song Sam-dong	
21 June	Two Doors	두 개의 문	Kim Il-ran, Hong Ji-you		
21 June	The Heaven is Only Open to the Single!	설마 그럴리가 없어	David Cho	Choi Yoon-so, Lee Neung-ryong	
21 June	I AM.: SM Town Live World Tour in Madison Square Garden	아이엠	Choi Jin-sung	Kangta, BoA, TVXQ, Super Junior, Girls' Generation, Shinee, f(x)	
21 June	Miss Conspirator	미쓰 GO	Park Chul-kwan	Go Hyun-jung, Yoo Hae-jin	
21 June	The Suck Up Project: Mr. XXX-Kisser	아부의 왕	Jeong Seung-koo	Song Sae-byeok, Sung Dong-il	
21 June	Two Weddings and a Funeral	두 번의 결혼식과 한 번의 장례식	Kim Jho Kwang-soo	Kim Dong-yoon, Ryu Hyun-kyung	
5 July	Deranged	연가시	Park Jung-woo	Kim Myung-min, Moon Jeong-hee, Kim Dong-wan	
12 July	Bloody Fight in Iron-Rock Valley	철암계곡의 혈투	Ji Ha-jean	Lee Moo-saeng, Yun Sang-hwa	
12 July	Dangerously Excited	나는 공무원이다	Koo Ja-hong	Yoon Je-moon, Sung Joon	
12 July	Sex, Lies, and Videotape	섹스 거짓말 그리고 비디오 테이프	Bong Man-dae	Lee Moo-saeng, Go Soo-hee, Shim Jae-kyoon	
12 July	The Sleepless	두 개의 달	Kim Dong-bin	Park Han-byul, Kim Ji-seok, Park Jin-joo	
12 July	Venus in Furs	모피를 입은 비너스	Song Yae-sup	Seo Jung, Baek Hyun-jin	
19 July	A Millionaire on the Run	5백만불의 사나이	Kim Ik-ro	Park Jin-young, Jo Sung-ha, Min Hyo-rin	
19 July	Ukulele Love Together	우쿨렐레 사랑모임	No Hyo-doo	Kim Ki-in, Oh Kyoung-ho, Lee Kook-pyo, Jo Mi-hwa, Kwak Sin-young	
25 July	Horror Stories	무서운 이야기	Min Kyu-dong, Im Dae-woong, Jung Bum-sik, Hong Ji-young, Kim Gok, Kim Sun	("Beginning") Kim Ji-won, Yoo Yeon-seok ("Endless Flight") Choi Yoon-young, Jin Tae-hyun ("Don't Answer to the Door") Kim Hyun-soo, Noh Kang-min ("Secret Recipe") Nam Bo-ra, Jung Eun-chae, Bae Soo-bin ("Ambulance on the Death Zone") Kim Ye-won, Kim Ji-young, Jo Han-cheol	
25 July	Padak	파닥파닥	Lee Dae-hee	Kim Hyun-ji, Ahn Young-mi	
25 July	The Thieves	도둑들	Choi Dong-hoon	Kim Yoon-seok, Lee Jung-jae, Kim Hye-soo, Jun Ji-hyun	
26 July	An Escalator in World Order	미국의 바람과 불	Kim Kyung-man		
27 July	Seo Taiji Record of the 8th - 398	서태지 8집: 398일의 기록	Seo Taiji	Seo Taiji, Shim Eun-kyung (narration)	
8 August	AV Idol	AV아이돌	Hideo Jojo	Yui Tatsumi, Yeo Min-jeong	
8 August	Chubby Revolution	통통한 혁명	Min Du-sik	Lee So-jung, Lee Hyun-jin	
8 August	The Grand Heist	바람과 함께 사라지다	Kim Joo-ho	Cha Tae-hyun, Oh Ji-ho	
8 August	I Am the King	나는 왕이로소이다	Jang Kyu-sung	Ju Ji-hoon, Park Yeong-gyu, Baek Yoon-sik, Byun Hee-bong, Kim Soo-ro	
8 August	Pengi and Sommi	황제펭귄 펭이와 솜이	Kim Jin-man, Kim Jae-yeong	Song Joong-ki (narration)	
15 August	R2B: Return to Base	R2B: 리턴 투 베이스	Kim Dong-won	Rain, Shin Se-kyung	
22 August	The Neighbor	이웃 사람	Kim Hwi	Yunjin Kim, Kim Sae-ron, Chun Ho-jin, Kim Sung-kyun	
23 August	90 Minutes	90분	Park Seon-uk	Joo Sang-wook, Jang Mi-inae	
23 August	Myselves: The Actress No Make-Up Project	나 나 나: 여배우 민낯 프로젝트	Boo Ji-young, Kim Kkot-bi, Seo Young-ju, Yang Eun-yong	Kim Kkot-bi, Seo Young-ju, Yang Eun-yong	
29 August	The Traffickers	공모자들	Lee Keun-woo	Im Chang-jung, Choi Daniel	
30 August	Project 577	577 프로젝트	Lee Keun-woo	Ha Jung-woo, Gong Hyo-jin	
30 August	The Ugly Duckling	미운 오리 새끼	Kwak Kyung-taek	Kim Jun-gu, Oh Dal-su	
30 August	Young Gun in the Time	영건 탐정 사무소	Oh Young-doo	Hong Young-geun, Choi Song-hyun, Bae Yong-geun	
6 September	Grape Candy	청포도 사탕: 17년 전의 약속	Kim Hee-jung	Park Jin-hee, Park Ji-yoon	
6 September	Pietà	피에타	Kim Ki-duk	Lee Jung-jin, Jo Min-su	
6 September	Wedding Scandal	웨딩스캔들	Shin Dong-yeob	Kim Min-jun, Kwak Ji-min	
13 September	Han Kyung-jik	한경직	Cheon Jeong-hoon		
13 September	Masquerade	광해: 왕이 된 남자	Choo Chang-min	Lee Byung-hun, Ryu Seung-ryong, Han Hyo-joo	
13 September	Too Old Hiphop Kid	투 올드 힙합 키드	Jung Dae-geon		
20 September	The Spies	간첩	Woo Min-ho	Kim Myung-min, Yum Jung-ah, Byun Hee-bong, Jung Gyu-woon, Yoo Hae-jin	
27 September	Jinsuk & Me	깔깔깔 희망버스	Lee Soo-jung	Kim Yeo-jin	
3 October	Ghost Sweepers	점쟁이들	Shin Jung-won	Kim Soo-ro, Lee Je-hoon, Kang Ye-won, Kwak Do-won	
11 October	A Company Man	회사원	Im Sang-yoon	So Ji-sub, Lee Mi-yeon, Kwak Do-won, Kim Dong-jun	
11 October	Dangerous Liaisons	위험한 관계	Hur Jin-ho	Jang Dong-gun, Zhang Ziyi, Cecilia Cheung	
11 October	Hanaan	하나안	Pak Ruslan	Stanislav Tyan, Bahodir Musaev	
11 October	SM Town Live in Tokyo Special Edition 3D	SM타운 라이브 인 도쿄 스페셜 에디션 3D	Yoo Ho-jin	BoA, TVXQ, Super Junior, Girls' Generation, Shinee	
11 October	Star	스타: 빛나는 사랑	Han Sang-hee	Hwanhee, Kim Soo-yeon	
18 October	Bittersweet Joke	미쓰 마마	Paik Yeon-ah	Choi Hyoung-sook, Kim Hyun-jin	
18 October	The Great Flight	위대한 비행	Chin Jae-un		
18 October	INFINITE Concert Second Invasion Evolution The Movie 3D	인피니트 콘서트 세컨드 인베이전 에볼루션 더 무비 3D	Son Seok	Infinite	
18 October	Mac Korea	맥코리아	Kim Hyeong-ryeo		
18 October	Perfect Number	용의자 X	Bang Eun-jin	Ryoo Seung-bum, Lee Yo-won, Cho Jin-woong	
18 October	Remembrance of MB	MB의 추억	Kim Jae-hwan		
19 October	Beating Woman	패는 여자	Kim Choon-sik	Joo Joo-hyeon, Jeon Se-hyeon	
25 October	Almost Che	강철대오: 구국의 철가방	Yook Sang-hyo	Kim In-kwon, Yoo Da-in, Jo Jung-suk, Park Chul-min	
25 October	Barbie	바비	Lee Sang-woo	Lee Chun-hee, Kim Sae-ron	
25 October	Circle of Crime - Director's Cut	비정한 도시	Kim Mun-heum	Kim Suk-hoon, Jo Sung-ha, Seo Young-hee, Lee Ki-young	
25 October	A House with a View	전망좋은 집	Lee Soo-sung	Kwak Hyun-hwa, Ha Na-kyoung	
25 October	Open to You	부귀영화	In Jin-mee	Lee Yuly, Park Hae-rin	
31 October	The Peach Tree	복숭아나무	Ku Hye-sun	Ryu Deok-hwan, Cho Seung-woo, Nam Sang-mi	
31 October	A Werewolf Boy	늑대 소년	Jo Sung-hee	Song Joong-ki, Park Bo-young	
1 November	Dirty Blood	나쁜 피	Kang Hyo-jin	Yoon Joo, Im Dae-il	
1 November	The Window	창	Yeon Sang-ho	Lee Hwan, Lee Su-hyung	
8 November	Confession of Murder	내가 살인범이다	Jung Byung-gil	Jung Jae-young, Park Si-hoo	
8 November	Modern Family	가족 시네마	Shin Su-won; Hong Ji-young; Lee Soo-youn; Kim Sung-ho	("Circleline") Jung In-gi ("E.D. 571") Sunwoo Sun ("In Good Company") Lee Myung-haeng ("Star Shaped Stain") Kim Ji-young	
8 November	Touch	터치	Min Byung-hun	Kim Ji-young, Yoo Jun-sang	
15 November	Code Name: Jackal	자칼이 온다	Bae Hyoung-jun	Kim Jaejoong, Song Ji-hyo	
15 November	Going South	남쪽으로 간다	Leesong Hee-il	Kim Jae-heung, Chun Shin-hwan	
15 November	Natural Burials	수목장	Park Kwang-chun	Lee Young-ah, On Joo-wan, Park Soo-jin	
15 November	Suddenly, Last Summer	지난여름, 갑자기	Leesong Hee-il	Kim Young-jae, Han Joo-wan	
15 November	White Night	백야	Leesong Hee-il	Won Tae-hee, Lee Yi-kyung	
15 November	The Winter of the Year Was Warm	내가 고백을 하면	David Cho	Kim Tae-woo, Ye Ji-won	
22 November	All Bark, No Bite	개들의 전쟁	Cho Byeong-ok	Kim Mu-yeol, Jin Seon-kyu	
22 November	Don't Cry Mommy	돈 크라이 마미	Kim Yong-han	Yoo Sun, Nam Bo-ra, Yu Oh-seong	
22 November	In Between	사이에서	Min Du-sik, Eo ll-seon	("Time to Leave") Hwang Soo-jung, Ki Tae-young ("Mineral Water") Park Chul-min, Chun Woo-hee	
22 November	Juvenile Offender	범죄소년	Kang Yi-kwan	Seo Young-joo, Lee Jung-hyun	
22 November	National Security	남영동 1985	Chung Ji-young	Park Won-sang, Lee Geung-young	
22 November	Turn It Up to Eleven 2: Wild Days	반드시 크게 들을 것 2: Wild Days	Baek Seung-hwa	Galaxy Express	
22 November	Woosoossi	철가방 우수씨	Yoon Hak-ryul	Choi Soo-jong, Gi Ju-bong	
29 November	26 Years	26년	Cho Geun-hyun	Jin Goo, Han Hye-jin, Bae Soo-bin, Im Seulong	
29 November	Knock	노크	Lee Joo-heon	Seo Woo, Kim Hyun-sung, Joo Min-ha	
29 November	Tone-deaf Clinic	음치클리닉	Kim Jin-young	Park Ha-sun, Yoon Sang-hyun	
6 December	Ari Ari The Korean Cinema	영화판	Heo Chul	Chung Ji-young, Yoon Jin-seo	
6 December	My PS Partner	나의 P.S. 파트너	Baek Sung-hyun	Ji Sung, Kim Ah-joong	
6 December	Paradox Circle	네모난원	Kim Seong-hoon	Kim Jeong-hak, Kim Jeong-wook, Han Yeo-woon	
6 December	Role Play	롤플레이	Baek Sang-yeol	Lee Dong-gyu, Kim Jin-sun	
13 December	China Blue	차이나 블루	Kim Geon	Baek Sung-hyun, Kim Joo-young, Jung Joo-yeon	
19 December	Love 911	반창꼬	Jeong Gi-hun	Go Soo, Han Hyo-joo	
19 December	Marrying the Mafia 5: Return of the Family	가문의 영광5 - 가문의 귀환	Jeong Yong-ki	Jung Joon-ho, Kim Min-jung	
19 December	The Tower	타워	Kim Ji-hoon	Sul Kyung-gu, Son Ye-jin, Kim Sang-kyung	
28 December	Day Trip	청출어람	Park Chan-wook, Park Chan-kyong	Song Kang-ho, Jeon Hyo-jung	

== See also ==
- 2012 in South Korea
- 2012 in South Korean music
- List of Korean-language films
- List of South Korean actresses
- List of South Korean male actors
