= Won Tae-hee =

South Korean actor and film director

- Born: 13 December 1978 (age 47); South Korea
- Occupations: Actor; film director

Korean name
- Hangul: 원태희
- RR: Won Taehui
- MR: Wŏn T'aehŭi

Won Tae-hee (born 13 December 1978) is a South Korean actor and film director. Won is also known as the Ha Jung-woo of independent films.

== Career ==
Won has been sporadically active in film and television for a decade since his debut in Sword in the Moon in 2003. However, he has become active in independent films such as My Heart Beats (2011) and Rain & Rain (2012). In 2012, he appeared as the lead in two well-received works by Lee-Song Hee-il's White Night (2012) and Lee Sang-woo's Fire in Hell (2014).

He has also started to direct his own indie films Cinema (2015) and In Another Place.

== Filmography ==
=== As actor ===
==== Television series ====
Year	Title	Role
2005	Drama City: "Pokhara"	
2006	Dr. Kkang	Junior high school student
2006	Invincible Parachute Agent	Lee Joo-bin

==== Film ====
Year	Title	Role
2002	Four Toes	
2002	Forgive Me Once Again Despite Hatred 2002	
2003	Sword in the Moon	
2004	Radio Dreams (short film)	
2005	Flowering Day (short film)	
2007	Temptation of Eve: Her Own Art	Min-gyu
2009	Thirsty (short film)	
2011	My Heart Beats	Byeol
2011	Lost and Found (short film)	
2012	Rain & Rain	
2012	White Night	Won-gyu
2013	Entry (short film)	Whistle police
2014	Three Hours Between Planes	Park Ji-hoon
2014	Night Flight	Shin Yong-joo's friend
2014	Fire in Hell	Ji-wol
2015	Cancelled Faces	
2015	A Lonely Bird (short film)	
2016	Black Stone	
2017	Come, Together	Manager
2017	In to from	

=== As director ===
- Cinema (short, 2015)
- In Another Place (TBA)

== Awards and nominations ==
Year	Award	Category	Nominated work	Result
2012	34th Moscow International Film Festival	Best Actor	Fire in Hell	Nominated
