= 42nd Yokohama Film Festival =

2021 film festival in Yokohama, Japan

- Location: Yokohama, Kanagawa, Japan
- Founded: 1980
- Festival date: 2021

The 42nd Yokohama Film Festival (第４２回ヨコハマ映画祭) was held on 5 February 2021. Because of the COVID-19 pandemic, the physical awards ceremony was cancelled and an official pamphlet was released on 5 February 2021. The winners had been notified on 5 December 2020, and given their prizes individually.

== Awards ==
- Best Film: - Labyrinth of Cinema
- Best Director: Hideo Jojo - On the Edge of Their Seats, Dangerous Drugs of Sex
- Yoshimitsu Morita Memorial Best New Director: Takuya Uchiyama - Sasaki In My Mind
- Best Screenplay: Shin Adachi - A Beloved Wife, Underdog Parts 1 and 2
- Best Cinematographer: Hidetoshi Shinomiya - Sasaki In My Mind, Town Of Headcounts
- Best Actor: Kazunari Ninomiya - The Asadas
- Best Actress: Asami Mizukawa - A Beloved Wife, Runway
- Best Supporting Actor:
  - Shohei Uno - The Voice of Sin, The Real Thing
  - Naoto Ogata - Momi's House
- Best Supporting Actress: Aju Makita - True Mothers, Child of the Stars
- Best Newcomer:
  - Nana Mori - Last Letter, 461 Days of Bento: A Promise Between Father and Son, Blue, Painful and Brittle
  - Kisetsu Fujiwara - Sasaki In My Mind, His
  - Hio Miyazawa - His
  - Sakurako Konishi - First Love, Fancy, Sasaki In My Mind
- Examiner Special Award:: Gaku Hosokawa - Sasaki In My Mind
- Special Grand Prize: Nobuhiko Obayashi and Kyoko Obayashi - Labyrinth of Cinema

== Top 10 ==
1. Labyrinth of Cinema
2. A Beloved Wife
3. The Asadas
4. True Mothers
5. Wife of a Spy
6. On the Edge of Their Seats
7. The Voice of Sin
8. The Real Thing
9. I Never Shot Anyone
10. Sasaki In My Mind

runner-up: 37 Seconds
