= Number One (2026 film) =

2026 film by Kim Tae-yong

- Theatrical release poster
- Hangul: 넘버원
- RR: Neombeo won
- MR: Nŏmbŏ wŏn
- Directed by: Kim Tae-yong
- Screenplay by: Kim Tae-yong
- Based on: The Number of Times You Can Eat Your Mother's Cooking is 328 by Sora Uwano
- Produced by: Lee Jung-im
- Starring: Choi Woo-shik; Jang Hye-jin; Gong Seung-yeon
- Cinematography: Mun Yong-gun
- Edited by: Yang Dong-yeop
- Music by: Kim Hae-won
- Production companies: Semicolon Studio; Studio Double M; By4M Studio; IPD Studio
- Distributed by: By4M Studio
- Release date: February 11, 2026
- Running time: 105 minutes
- Country: South Korea
- Language: Korean
- Box office: US$1.8 million

Number One (Korean: 넘버원) is a 2026 South Korean fantasy film written and directed by Kim Tae-yong. Based on the novel The Number of Times You Can Eat Your Mother's Cooking is 328 by Sora Uwano, it stars Choi Woo-shik, Jang Hye-jin, and Gong Seung-yeon. Co-produced and distributed by By4M Studio, the film was released in South Korea on February 11, 2026.

== Synopsis ==
Every time he eats the food his mother cooks, Ha-min begins to see mysterious numbers floating before his eyes. With each bite of his mother's cooking, the number decreases by one. When he realizes that the number reaching zero means his mother, Eun-sil, will die, Ha-min's once ordinary life is turned upside down in an instant. To protect his mother, Ha-min starts avoiding her home-cooked meals, making all kinds of excuses.

== Cast ==
- Choi Woo-shik as Ha-min
- Jang Hye-jin as Eun-sil, Ha-min's mother
- Gong Seung-yeon as Ryeo-eun, Ha-min's girlfriend
- Yoo Jae-myung as Ha-min's father
- Jang Yeon-woo as Ha-jun
- Yang Kyung-won as Chang-seok
- Kim Young-min as Doctor

== Production ==
The film marks the reunion of director Kim Tae-yong and Choi Woo-shik, who previously collaborated on the 2014 film Set Me Free. Jang Hye-jin, who earlier portrayed Choi's mother in the 2019 film Parasite, co-stars as Eun-sil.

== Release ==
The film was released theatrically on February 11, 2026, on 647 screens.

== Reception ==
Moon Ki-hoon of The Korea Herald described Number One as a "painfully safe" family drama that squanders the promise of its fantasy premise and Choi Woo-shik's performance, criticizing it as overly sentimental and conventional. Woo Jae-yeon of Yonhap News described the film as a quiet and unpretentious fantasy drama that approaches themes of death and family with warmth, praising its emotionally resonant performances and focus on the value of everyday moments.
