= Black Stone (2015 film) =

2015 South Korean–French film

- 블랙스톤
- Directed by: Roh Gyeong-tae
- Written by: Roh Gyeong-tae
- Produced by: Antonin Dedet
- Starring: Won Tae-hee; Kate Velarde; Erlinda Villalobos; Son Suk-ku
- Cinematography: Cho Young Sang
- Edited by: Choi Hyun Sook
- Music by: Olivier Alary
- Production companies: Neon Productions; Teddy Bear Films Company
- Distributed by: Outplay (worldwide); Teddy Bear Films Company (South Korea)
- Release dates: 23 January 2015 (International Film Festival Rotterdam); 28 March 2016 (South Korea)
- Running time: 93 minutes
- Country: South Korea/France
- Language: Korean

Black Stone (Korean: 블랙스톤) is a 2015 South Korean—French film about a young South Korean army recruit who deserts the military after facing sexual abuse. It stars the South Korean actor Won Tae-hee, who is shown in brief full-frontal nudity.

== Plot ==
Black Stone tells the story of a deserting army recruit who returns to his parents' home in Seoul, where they worked in a food processing factory, to find they have disappeared. Intent on discovering where they have gone, he enters the jungle where his father was born, and finds it to be contaminated. The film is the last part of a trilogy about environmental pollution, inspired by the French film director Robert Bresson and the Thai film director Apichatpong Weerasethakul.

== See also ==
- List of South Korean films of 2015
- Nudity in film (East Asian cinema since 1929)
