= Junkhearts =

2011 film

- Directed by: Tinge Krishnan
- Written by: Simon Frank
- Starring: Eddie Marsan
- Release date: 4 November 2011
- Running time: 99 minutes
- Country: United Kingdom
- Language: English

Junkhearts is 2011 British drama film directed by Tinge Krishnan. It won the Golden St. George at the 34th Moscow International Film Festival.

== Cast ==
- Eddie Marsan as Frank
- Candese Reid as Lynette
- Tom Sturridge as Danny
- John Boyega as Jamal
- Romola Garai as Christine
- Shaun Dooley as Josh
- Nabil Elouahabi as Fisherman
- Bhasker Patel as Hasan
- Scott McNess as Carson
- Valerie Gogan as Evie
- Chris Coghill as Banker
- Debra Baker as Receptionist
- Salima Saxton as Dr. Ghosh
- Scarlett Sabet as Sally
