= 34th Moscow International Film Festival =

- Opening film: Dukhless
- Closing film: Beloved
- Location: Moscow, Russia
- Founded: 1959
- Awards: Golden George (Junkhearts )
- Festival date: 21–30 June 2012
- Website: http://www.moscowfilmfestival.ru

The 34th Moscow International Film Festival was held from 21 to 30 June 2012. Dukhless was selected as the opening gala film and closed with Beloved by Christophe Honoré. The Golden George was awarded to Junkhearts (2011) directed by Tinge Krishnan.

== Jury ==
The Jury for the 34th Moscow International Film Festival announced on June 7, 2012.

=== Main Competition Jury ===
- Hector Babenco (Brazil – President of the Jury)
- Sergei Loban (Russia)
- Jean-Marc Barr (France)
- Adriana Chiesa Di Palma (Italy)
- Javor Gardev (Bulgaria)

=== Perspectives Competition Jury ===
- Marina Razbezhkina (Russia – Perspectives competition Jury)
- Sylvia Perel (Mexico)
- Darezhan Omirbayev (Kazakhstan)

=== Documentary Competition Jury ===
- Vladimir Evaldovich Eisner (Russia – Documentary competition Jury)
- Pawel Pawlikowski (Poland)
- Jon Alpert (USA)

== Competition ==
The following films were selected for the main competition:

- 80 Million / 80 Millionow directed by Waldemar Krzystek
- A Cherry on a Pomegranate Tree? / Shi Liu Shu Shang Ошу ying Tao directed by LI chen
- A.C.A.B. directed by Stefano Sollima
- Expiration Date / Fecha de caducidad directed by Kenya Marquez
- Fire in Hell / Jioghwa directed by Lee Sang-woo
- Growing in the Wind / Routedan dar Bad directed by Rahbar Ghanbari
- Gulf Stream Under the Iceberg / Golfa straume zem ledus kalna directed by Jevgeņijs Paškevičs
- July / Krapetz directed by Kiril Stankov
- Junkhearts directed by Tinge Krishnan
- Lonely Island / Üksik saar directed by Peeter Simm
- Magnifica presenza directed by Ferzan Özpetek
- Naked Harbour / Vuosaari directed by Aku Louhimies
- Apostle / O Apóstolo directed by Fernando Cortizo
- Rita's Last Fairy Tale / Poslednyaya skazka Rity directed by Renata Litvinova
- The Door / Az ajtó? directed by István Szabó
- The Horde / Орда directed by Andrei Proshkin
- Vegetarian Cannibal / Ljudozder Vegetarijanac directed by Branko Schmidt

== Perspectives competition ==
- 170 Hz
- Amaro Amore
- Ana-Bana
- Bebop
- City of Children / I poli ton paidion
- Dr.Ketel
- Everybody's gone
- Fourth Dimension
- Garbage
- Horizon / Tian Bian
- If only everyone... / Yet’ye bolory...
- The wreckers
- Where is my mother tongue? / Ana Dilim Nerede

== Documentary competition ==
- Colors of Math
- Searching for Sugarman
- The Ambassador
- The World before Her
- Theatre Svoboda / Divadlo Svoboda
- Tomorrow / Zavtra
- TT3D: Closer to the Edge

== Short film corner ==
- Ash
- Away / V Put
- Brother / Broer
- Jealousy
- Man in Fear
- Sirocco / Shluq
- Taxi Karaoke
- The Centrifuge Brain Project
- The Metamorphosis

== Awards ==
Winners for the 34th Moscow Film Festival has been announced on June 30, 2012.

- Main Prize “Golden George” for the best film:

JUNKHEARTS (dir. Tinge Krishnan, UK)

- Special Jury Prize “Silver George”:

FECHA DE CADUCIDAD (dir. Kenya Marquez, Mexico)

- “Silver George” for the best director:

ANDREY PROSHKIN (“THE HORDE”, Russia)

- “Silver George” for the best actor:

Eddie Marsan (“Junkhearts”, UK)

- “Silver George” for the best actress:

ROZA HAIRULLINA (“THE HORDE”, Russia)

- “Silver George” for the best film of the "Perspectives" competition:

THE WRECKERS (dir. D.R.HOOD, UK)

- “Silver George” for the best film of the documentary competition:

SEARCHING FOR SUGARMAN (dir. Malik Bendjelloul, Sweden, UK)

- Special Prize for An Outstanding Contribution To The World Cinema:

Tim Burton (USA)

- Special Prize for The Outstanding Achievement In The Career Of Acting and Devotion To The Principles of K.Stanislavsky's school:

Catherine Deneuve (France)

== See also ==
- 2012 Cannes Film Festival
- 66th British Academy Film Awards
- 70th Golden Globe Awards
- 2012 in film
