= Lee Yeong-hoon =

South Korean actor

- Born: December 14, 1982 (age 43); Gwangju, South Korea
- Other names: Lee Young-hoon; Lee Yeong-hun; Lee Yeoung-hun
- Education: Suwon Science College - Broadcasting
- Occupation: Actor
- Years active: 2001–present
- Agent: Sim Entertainment

Korean name
- Hangul: 이영훈
- RR: I Yeonghun
- MR: I Yŏnghun
- Website: leeyounghun.com

Lee Yeong-hoon (born December 14, 1982) is a South Korean actor.

== Early life ==
Lee Yeong-hoon began his acting career after joining the MBC Academy while in high school. Some of his peers at academy also went on to future stardom, such as Zo In-sung and Lee So-yeon.

== Career ==
In 2001, at the age of 19, Lee made his acting debut win the short film Good Romance, directed by filmmaker Leesong Hee-il. Lee entered Suwon Science College as a Broadcasting major, and he performed numerous times on stage while at university.

Upon his discharge from mandatory military service, Leesong Hee-il again cast Lee, this time in the leading role in the indie feature No Regret. An attempt to realistically portray the lifestyle of a young gay man working in the host club industry, No Regret became a ground-breaking film in Korean queer cinema. It traveled the film festival circuit, screening to packed audiences at the 2006 Busan International Film Festival. Lee won Best New Actor at the Korean Association of Film Critics Awards, and he appeared in his first commercial in 2007 for McDonald's.

This was followed by his first major commercial film, the 2008 horror-thriller The Guard Post. Lee was praised by The Korea Times for "shining brightly" in his role as the prime suspect in a massacre of 20 soldiers in the DMZ, and received Best New Actor nominations from the Blue Dragon Film Awards and Korean Film Awards.

Lee continues to star in independent films, including romance drama Ride Away and hip hop-themed The Beat Goes On.

== Filmography ==
=== Film ===
Year	Title	Role	Notes
2001	Good Romance	Won-kyu	short film
2006	No Regret	Lee Soo-min	
2008	The Guard Post	Corporal Kang Jin-won	
2008	Ride Away	Kim Soo-wook	
2010	One Night Stand	Male college student	cameo (first segment)
2010	Break Away	Kang Jae-hoon	
2010	Troubleshooter	Park Hyung-joon ("Psycho")	
2012	The Beat Goes On	Kim Min-soo ("Mad Dog")	
2012	Just Friends	Shim Jae-wook	
2012	The Traffickers	Dae-woong	
2013	Top Star	"Song of the Sun" gunman 2	
2014	Girls, Girls, Girls	Hyeon-soo	
2015	Coin Locker	Sang-pil	

=== Television series ===
Year	Title	Role
2009	Her Style	Kim Jong-tae
2011	Detectives in Trouble	Kim Young-tae (guest)
2013	Blue Tower Zero	Lee Young-hoon
2015	KBS Drama Special "The Wind Blows to the Hope"	Bang Dae-sik

== Theater ==
Year	Title	Role
	The Virtuous Burglar	
	어둠의 힘	
	A Midsummer Night's Dream	
	Three Sisters	

== Awards and nominations ==
Year	Award	Category	Nominated work	Result
2006	26th Korean Association of Film Critics Awards	Best New Actor	No Regret	Won
2007	43rd Baeksang Arts Awards	Best New Actor (Film)	No Regret	Nominated
2008	29th Blue Dragon Film Awards	Best New Actor	The Guard Post	Nominated
2008	7th Korean Film Awards	Best New Actor	The Guard Post	Nominated
