= Eddie Marsan =

British actor (born 1968)

Eddie Marsan OBE
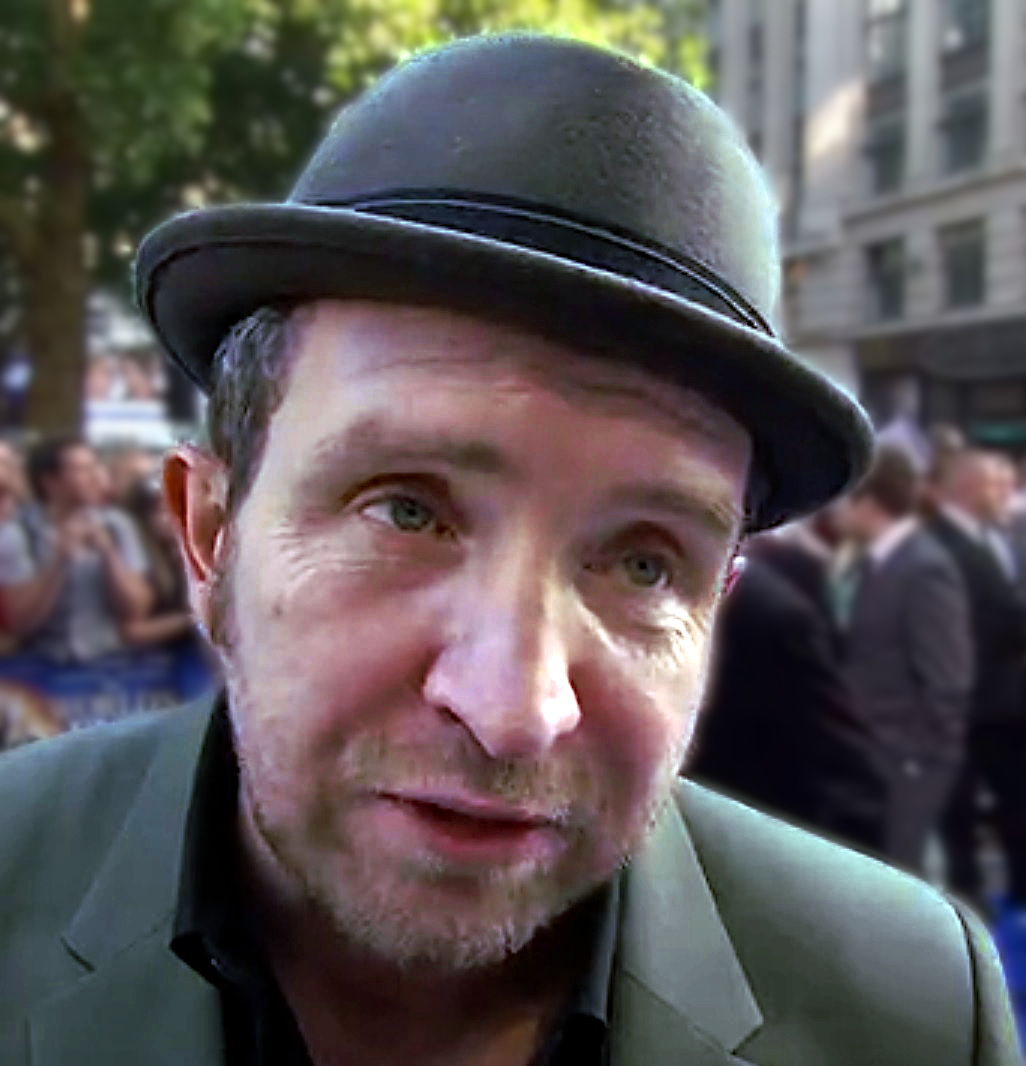
- Marsan at The World's End premiere, Leicester Square, in 2013
- Born: Edward Maurice Charles Marsan; 9 June 1968 (age 58); Stepney, London, England
- Education: Mountview Academy of Theatre Arts
- Occupation: Actor
- Years active: 1990–present
- Spouse: Janine Schneider (m. 2002)
- Children: 4

Edward Maurice Charles Marsan OBE (born 9 June 1968) is an English actor. He won the London Film Critics Circle Award and the National Society of Film Critics Award for Best Supporting Actor for the film Happy-Go-Lucky (2008).

== Early life and education ==
Marsan was born on 9 June 1968 in the Stepney district of London to a working-class family; his father was a lorry driver and his mother was a school dinner lady and teaching assistant. He was brought up in Bethnal Green and attended Raine's Foundation School. He left school at 16 and initially served an apprenticeship as a printer before beginning his career in theatre.

He trained at the Mountview Academy of Theatre Arts, graduating in 1991, and went on to study under Sam Kogan at the Kogan Academy of Dramatic Arts, now known as The School of the Science of Acting, of which Marsan is now a patron. His first year at drama school was funded by Mr Benny, a bookmaker who ran a menswear shop where Marsan worked; he obtained scholarships for the rest of the course. It took many attempts for Marsan to get a place at drama school.

== Career ==
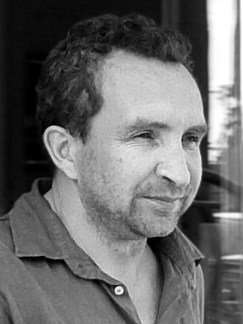
Marsan at the 2009 Toronto International Film Festival

Marsan's first television appearance was in 1992 as a "yob" in the London Weekend Television series The Piglet Files. One of his more significant early television appearances was in the popular mid-1990s BBC sitcom Game On as an escaped convict who was an old flame of Mandy's. Marsan went on to have roles in Casualty, The Bill, Grass, Kavanagh QC, Grange Hill, Silent Witness, Ultimate Force, Southcliffe, and more. He also voiced the Manticore in the Merlin episode "Love in the Time of Dragons".

In 2011, he starred alongside Olivia Colman and Peter Mullan, all three actors relatively unknown at that time, in the British drama film Tyrannosaur.

In 2013, he began portraying Terry Donovan, brother to the lead character in 7 series and 82 episodes of Showtime's drama series Ray Donovan. The same year he played Ludwig Guttmann in the television film The Best of Men. In May 2015, Marsan appeared as the practical magician Gilbert Norrell in the BBC period drama Jonathan Strange & Mr Norrell.

Marsan's film roles include the main villain in the 2008 superhero film Hancock alongside Will Smith and as Inspector Lestrade in Guy Ritchie's Sherlock Holmes. His other films include Sixty Six, Gangs of New York, 21 Grams, The Illusionist, V for Vendetta, Gangster No. 1, Miami Vice, Mission: Impossible III, I Want Candy, Vera Drake, Happy-Go-Lucky, Filth, Tyrannosaur and Heartless.

In 2021, Marsan appeared as anti-Fascist activist Soly Malinovsky in the television adaptation of the novel Ridley Road. In 2022, he played the real-life role of John Darwin in ITV's drama series The Thief, His Wife and the Canoe.

Marsan appeared as Mitch Winehouse, father of Amy Winehouse, in the biopic Back to Black, which was released in 2024.

== Personal life ==
Marsan married make-up artist Janine Schneider in 2002. They have four children. Marsan is a humanist and was appointed a patron of Humanists UK in 2015. He was critical of the lack of representation of working-class people in the arts in 2015 on BBC Radio 5 Live in which he stated too much drama is written from "the white, privileged, middle class perspective". In 2024, he was interviewed on HARDtalk in an episode titled "Do the arts neglect working-class people?".

Marsan was appointed Officer of the Order of the British Empire (OBE) in the 2025 New Year Honours for service to drama.

== Filmography ==
=== Film ===
Key
†	Denotes films that have not yet been released

Year	Title	Role	Notes
1997	The Man Who Knew Too Little	Mugger No. 1	
1999	This Year's Love	Eddie	
1999	Janice Beard	Mr. Tense	
2000	Gangster No. 1	Eddie Miller	
2001	The Emperor's New Clothes	Louis Marchand	
2001	The Bunker	Pfc Kreuzmann	
2002	Gangs of New York	Killoran	
2003	AfterLife	Jez Walters	
2003	21 Grams	Reverend John	
2004	The Rocket Post	Heinz Dombrowsky	
2004	Vera Drake	Reg	
2005	The Secret Life of Words	Victor	
2005	Beowulf & Grendel	Father Brendan	
2005	The New World	Eddie	
2005	The Headsman	Fabio	
2006	V for Vendetta	Brian Etheridge	
2006	Mission: Impossible III	Brownway	
2006	Miami Vice	Nicholas	
2006	Sixty Six	Manny Reuben	
2006	The Illusionist	Josef Fischer	
2006	Pierrepoint	James "Tish" Corbitt	
2007	I Want Candy	Doug Perry	
2007	Grow Your Own	Little John	
2008	Happy-Go-Lucky	Scott	
2008	Hancock	Kenneth "Red" Parker Jr.	
2008	Me and Orson Welles	John Houseman	
2008	Faintheart	Richard	
2009	Red Riding	Jack Whitehead	
2009	Sherlock Holmes	Inspector Lestrade	
2009	The Disappearance of Alice Creed	Vic	
2009	Heartless	Weapons Man	
2010	London Boulevard	DI Bailey	
2011	Junkhearts	Frank	
2011	Tyrannosaur	James	
2011	Sherlock Holmes: A Game of Shadows	Inspector Lestrade	
2011	War Horse	Sgt. Fry	
2012	I, Anna	DI Kevin Franks	
2012	Snow White and the Huntsman	Duir	
2012	A Running Jump	Perry	Short film
2013	Jack the Giant Slayer	Crawe	
2013	The World's End	Peter Page	
2013	Filth	Bladesey	
2013	Still Life	John May	
2014	God's Pocket	Smilin' Jack Moran	
2014	X+Y	Richard	
2015	Concussion	Steven DeKosky	
2016	A Kind of Murder	Marty Kimmel	
2016	The Limehouse Golem	Uncle	
2016	Their Finest	Sammy Smith	
2016	The Exception	Heinrich Himmler	
2017	Atomic Blonde	Spyglass	
2017	Mark Felt: The Man Who Brought Down the White House	Agency Man	
2018	Entebbe	Shimon Peres	
2018	Deadpool 2	The Headmaster	
2018	White Boy Rick	Art Derrick	
2018	Mowgli: Legend of the Jungle	Vihaan	Voice and motion capture role
2018	Vice	Paul Wolfowitz	
2019	Hostage Radio	Jarvis Dolan	Original title: Feedback
2019	The Professor and the Madman	Muncie	
2019	Hobbs & Shaw	Professor Andreiko	
2019	Abigail	Jonathan Foster	
2019	Pets United	The Cyborg / The Mayor / Frank Stone	Voice role
2019	The Gentlemen	Big Dave	
2021	Wrath of Man	Terry	
2021	The Virtuoso	The Loner	
2021	Flag Day	Mr. Emmanuelle	
2021	Charlotte	Albert Salomon	Voice role
2022	The Contractor	Virgil	
2022	Choose or Die	Hal	
2022	Vesper	Jonas	
2023	Operation Fortune: Ruse de Guerre	Knighton	
2023	Fair Play	Campbell	
2023	Firebrand	Edward Seymour	
2024	Back to Black	Mitch Winehouse	
2024	Midas Man	Harry Epstein	
2025	All the Devils Are Here	Ronnie	
2026	No Ordinary Heist	Richard Murray	
2026	Heartstopper Forever	Geoff Young	
2026	Clayface	Frank Fitzpatrick	
TBA	Halftime Hero †	Harry Redknapp	Filming

=== Television ===
Key
†	Denotes television productions that have not yet been released

Year	Title	Role	Notes
1992	The Piglet Files	Yob	Episode: "Sex, Spies and Videotape"
1992–1996	The Bill	Martin Price/Roy Kilby/Dean Stacey/Gary Vaughan	4 episodes
1996	Casualty	Rick Grant	Episode: "Chain Reactions"
1996	EastEnders	Roddy	1 episode
1996	Game On	Stoat	Episode: "Heavy Bondage & Custard Creams"
1996–1998	Grange Hill	Andy Sutcliffe/Eddie Sutcliffe	3 episodes
1997	Get Well Soon	Brian Clapton	Main cast, 6 episodes
1997	Kavanagh QC	Ian Vincent	Episode: "The Ties That Bind"
1999	The Vice	Rhys	2 episodes
1999	Plastic Man	Liam Cooper	Miniseries, 2 episodes
2000	The Mrs Bradley Mysteries	Ronald Quincy	Episode: "The Worsted Viper"
2001	The Monkey King	Pigsy	Miniseries, 2 episodes
2002	Ultimate Force	Badger	Episode: "The Killing House"
2002	Judge John Deed	Ed Hay	Episode: "Nobody's Fool"
2003	Grass	Sunshine	3 episodes
2003	Charles II: The Power and the Passion	Titus Oates	Episode #1.4
2004	Coming Up	Martin	Episode: "The Baader Meinhoff Gang Show"
2004	Quite Ugly One Morning	Stephen Lime	Television film
2004	Silent Witness	Derek Portnoy	2 episodes
2006	Friends and Crocodiles	Martin Butterworth	Television film
2008	God on Trial	Lieble	Television film
2008	Little Dorrit	Pancks	Miniseries, 12 episodes
2008	The 39 Steps	Scudder	Television film
2009	Criminal Justice	Saul	Main cast, 5 episodes
2009–2010	Law & Order: UK	Jason Peters	2 episodes
2010	Merlin	The Manticore (voice)	Episode: "Love in the Time of Dragons"
2010	The Sarah Jane Adventures	Mr White	2-part story: Goodbye, Sarah Jane Smith
2011	Moby Dick	Stubb	Miniseries, 2 episodes
2012	Playhouse Presents	The Intruder	Episode: "Walking the Dogs"
2012	The Best of Men	Ludwig Guttmann	Television film
2013	Southcliffe	Andrew Salter	4 episodes
2013–2020	Ray Donovan	Terry Donovan	Main cast, 82 episodes
2015	Jonathan Strange & Mr Norrell	Gilbert Norrell	Miniseries, 7 episodes
2015	River	Thomas Neill Cream	Miniseries, 6 episodes
2015	Hunted	Narrator (voice)	Reality television series
2016	Galavant	Death	Episode: "Love and Death"
2017	Urban Myths	Bob Dylan	Episode: "Bob Dylan: Knockin' on Dave's Door"
2018	Indian Summer School	Narrator (voice)	Reality television series, 3 episodes
2020	Isolation Stories	Stephen	Miniseries, episode: "Karen"
2021	The Pact	Arwel Evans	4 episodes
2021	Deceit	Professor Paul Britton	Miniseries, 4 episodes
2021	Ridley Road	Soly Malinovsky	4 episodes
2022	Ray Donovan: The Movie	Terry Donovan	Television film
2022	The Thief, His Wife and the Canoe	John Darwin	Miniseries, 4 episodes
2023	The Power	Bernie Monke	Main role, 7 episodes
2023	The Winter King	Uther Pendragon	2 episodes
2024	Franklin	John Adams	Miniseries, 5 episodes
2024	Inside No. 9	Nathaniel	Episode: "The Curse of the Ninth"
2024	Suspect	Dr. Alistair Underwood	Episode: "Alistair"
2024	Supacell	Ray	2 episodes
2024	Heartstopper	Geoff Young	3 episodes
2025	Reunion	Stephen Renworth	4 episodes
2025	The Bombing of Pan Am 103	Tom Thurman	Miniseries, 5 episodes
2025	King & Conqueror	King Edward	Miniseries, 6 episodes
2026	Prisoner	Alex Tebbit	3 episodes
2026	The Lord of the Rings: The Rings of Power	Thráin	Season 3
TBA	Disinherited †	TBA	Upcoming role
TBA	Kennedy †	J. Edgar Hoover	Upcoming role

=== Video games ===
Year	Title	Role
2020	Deathtrap Dungeon	Narrator

== Awards and nominations ==
Year	Awards	Category	Work	Result	Ref.
2004	7th British Independent Film Awards	Best Supporting Actor/Actress	Vera Drake	Won	
2005	London Film Critics' Circle Awards	British Supporting Actor of the Year	Vera Drake	Nominated	
2007	London Film Critics' Circle Awards	British Supporting Actor of the Year	The Last Hangman	Nominated	
2008	11th British Independent Film Awards	BIFA for Best Supporting Actor	Happy-Go-Lucky	Won	
2008	Alliance of Women Film Journalists EDA awards	EDA Best Actor in Supporting Role	Happy-Go-Lucky	Nominated	
2008	Alliance of Women Film Journalists EDA awards	EDA Best Seduction (shared with: Sally Hawkins)	Happy-Go-Lucky	Nominated	
2008	Dallas–Fort Worth Film Critics Association Awards 2008	DFWFCA Best Supporting Actor	Happy-Go-Lucky	Won	
2008	Detroit Film Critics Society Awards	DFCS Best Supporting Actor	Happy-Go-Lucky	Nominated	
2008	IndieWire Critics Poll	ICP Best Supporting Performance	Happy-Go-Lucky	Nominated	
2008	Village Voice Film Poll	VVFP Best Supporting Actor	Happy-Go-Lucky	Nominated	
2008	Los Angeles Film Critics Association Awards	LAFCA Best Supporting Actor	Happy-Go-Lucky	Nominated	
2009	Chlotrudis Awards	Best Supporting Actor	Happy-Go-Lucky	Won	
2009	Central Ohio Film Critics Association awards	COFCA Best Supporting Actor	Happy-Go-Lucky	Nominated	
2009	Gold Derby Awards	Best Supporting Actor	Happy-Go-Lucky	Nominated	
2009	International Cinephile Society Awards	ICS Best Supporting Actor	Happy-Go-Lucky	Nominated	
2009	International Online Cinema Awards	INOCA Best Supporting Actor	Happy-Go-Lucky	Nominated	
2009	London Film Critics' Circle Awards	British Supporting Actor of the Year	Happy-Go-Lucky	Won	
2009	National Society of Film Critics	NSFC Best Supporting Actor	Happy-Go-Lucky	Won	
2009	Online Film & Television Association	OFTA Best Supporting Actor	Happy-Go-Lucky	Nominated	
2009	Online Film Critics Society Awards	OFCSA Best Supporting Actor	Happy-Go-Lucky	Nominated	
2009	Evening Standard British Film Awards	Peter Sellers Award for Comedy	Happy-Go-Lucky	Nominated	
2011	Evening Standard British Film Awards	Best Actor	The Disappearance of Alice Creed	Nominated	
2011	14th British Independent Film Awards	BIFA for Best Supporting Actor	Tyrannosaur	Nominated	
2012	Moscow International Film Festival	Silver St. George - Best Actor	Junkhearts	Won	
2013	16th British Independent Film Awards	BIFA for Best Supporting Actor	Filth	Nominated	
2014	Art Film Festival	Blue Angel award for Best Male Performance	Still Life	Won	
2014	Edinburgh International Film Festival	Best Performance in a British Feature Film	Still Life	Won	
2015	5th VOICES Film Festival, Vologda, Russia	Best Actor	Still Life	Won	
2022	BAFTA Cymru	Best Actor	The Pact	Nominated	
