= Remembrance of MB =

- Film poster
- Directed by: Kim Jae-hwan
- Written by: Kim Jae-hwan
- Produced by: Kang Su-heon
- Release date: October 18, 2012
- Running time: 65 minutes
- Country: South Korea
- Language: Korean

Remembrance of MB (Korean: MB의 추억) is a 2012 South Korean black comedy documentary film directed by Kim Jae-hwan. Named after President Lee Myung-bak's first name initials, it focuses on his 2007 election pledges and examines whether they have been achieved during his five-year term in office. A political documentary that makes people laugh and cry, Lee bursts onto the scene when the public yearns for a hero who will solve the economic crisis. However, voters' initial excitement turns into disappointment.

Screened at the 13th Jeonju International Film Festival, it was among the ten most popular films highly acclaimed by the audiences.

It was also popular, attracting 10,000 viewers just 21 days after its release in mid-October 2012. Coming in the midst of a new president election in December, it reminds viewers the importance of voting.

== Cast ==
- Ahn Suk-hwan as narrator
- Kang Su-heon
- Park Mun-jin
- Kim Je-dong (special appearance)
