= AV Idol (film) =

2012 film by Hideo Jōjō

- Japanese DVD cover
- Directed by: Hideo Jojo
- Starring: Yui Tatsumi; Yeo Min-jeong
- Release dates: 8 August 2012 (South Korea); 9 January 2013 (Japan)
- Running time: 99 minutes
- Countries: South Korea; Japan

AV Idol, released as Love & Seoul in Japan, (Korean: AV 아이돌, Japanese: ラブ＆ソウル) is a 2012 erotic comedy film directed by Hideo Jojo. It is a co-production between Japan and South Korea.

== Cast ==
- Yui Tatsumi as Ryoko
- Yeo Min-jeong as Yuna
