= Lee Yi-kyung =

South Korean actor (born 1989)

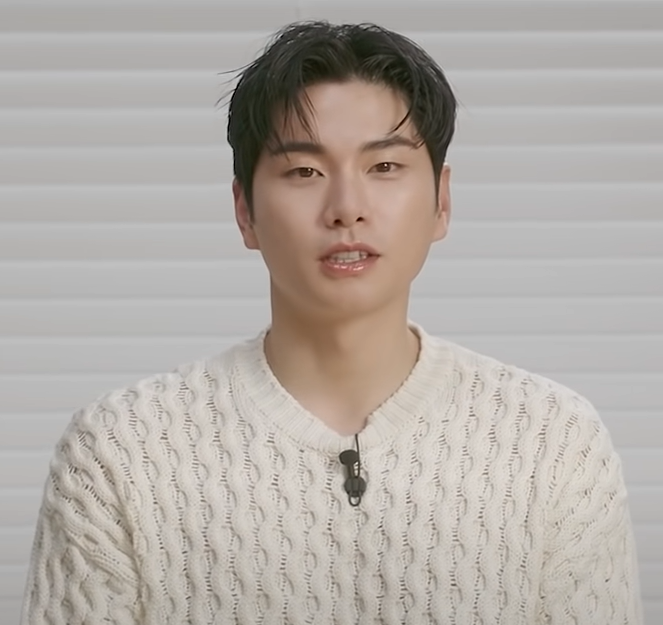
- Lee in March 2022
- Born: January 8, 1989 (age 37); Cheongju, North Chungcheong Province, South Korea
- Education: Seoul Institute of the Arts
- Occupation: Actor
- Years active: 2011–present
- Agent: Screening ENT

Korean name
- Hangul: 이이경
- RR: I Igyeong
- MR: I Igyŏng

Lee Yi-kyung (Korean: 이이경; born January 8, 1989) is a South Korean actor.

== Career ==
Lee enrolled in Seoul Institute of the Arts Acting Department class of 2011.

Lee made his acting debut in 2011, and first gained recognition from playing a rebellious student in the teen drama School 2013. Thereafter, he played supporting roles in television dramas such as My Love from the Star (2013) and Descendants of the Sun (2016). Lee gained popularity following his comedic role in Confession Couple. He was cast in his first major role in Welcome to Waikiki (2018) which was professionally successful for Lee, as he also played the lead actor in the critically well-received Children of Nobody.

Lee has also appeared in both independent and commercial films, notably Leesong Hee-il's White Night (2012) and Kim Ki-duk's One on One (2014). In 2018, he stars in two films - drama film Monsters (also known as Wretches) which tackles teenage bullying; and omnibus horror film Pension: Dangerous Encounter.

On March 8, 2022, it was reported that Lee's contract with HB Entertainment has ended. Later on March 25, 2022, Lee signed with Screening ENT after the expiration of his contract with the original agency.

After a year long break, Lee returns to acting in a major role in Marry My Husband (2024) where he plays the role of an irredeemable villain, a character that proves versatility from his usual friendly TV persona. His work in the series granted him a nomination to the 60th Baeksang Arts Award for Best Supporting Actor.

== Personal life ==
His father was the CEO of LG Innotek, Lee Ung-beom.

In April 2018, it was announced Lee was dating his Welcome to Waikiki co-star Jung In-sun. The couple was introduced by Lee's friend actor Lee Ki-woo and had been dating for a year before the news broke. However, in June 2018, the couple confirmed they had broken up.

In late 2025, controversy arose after posts alleging issues related to Lee's private life spread through online communities and social media. As disputes emerged over the authenticity of the materials and possible AI manipulation, Lee’s agency denied the claims and announced legal action for defamation.

In May 2026 media reported that Lee had been assessed additional tax after an audit of an independent one-person agency he operated while remaining with Sangyoung ENT. The amount was not disclosed. Sangyoung ENT said the assessment arose from differences in interpretation of expense-processing rules in running the corporation, that there had been no intentional concealment of income or tax evasion, that Lee had complied with tax law since his debut, and that he would pay the additional tax without delay.

== Filmography ==
=== Film ===
Year	Title	Role	Notes	Ref.
2011	US-Japanese Barbershop			
2011	Stitch Stitch			
2012	White Night	Tae-joon		
2014	One on One	Shadow 1		
2014	The Pirates	Cham-bok		
2014	Night Flight	Student part-timer		
2016	Curtain Call	Woo-sik		
2017	Confidential Assignment	Lee Dong-hoon		
2017	Baby Beside Me	Do-il		
2017	Hakuna Matata Pole Pole			
2018	Wretches	Yang-hoon		
2018	Pension: Dangerous Encounter			
2019	Beautiful Voice / Hakuna Matata Pole Pole	Go Min-soo		
2020	Hitman: Agent Jun	Cheol		
2022	6/45	Ri Young-ho		
2022	Late Night Cafe : Missing Honey	Ahn Tae-young		
2023	Woongnami	Mal-bong		
2023	The Moon	Cho Yoon-jong	Special appearance	
2025	Hitman 2	Cheol		

=== Television series ===
Year	Title	Role	Notes	Ref.
2011	Heartstrings	Student dancer	Cameo	
2012	School 2013	Lee Yi-kyung		
2013	Nine	Han Young-hoon (1992)		
2013	The Blade and Petal	Tae-pyung		
2013	My Love from the Star	Lee Shin		
2014	Lovers of Music	Shin Hyo-yeol		
2014	You're All Surrounded	Shin Ki-jae		
2014	KBS Drama Special – Bride in Sneakers	Kyu-cheol	One act-drama	
2015	More Than a Maid	Heo Yoon-seo		
2015	The Superman Age	Lee Yi-kyung		
2015	Yumi's Room	Jeon Na-baek		
2015	My First Time	Choi Hoon		
2016	Descendants of the Sun	Kang Min-jae		
2016	Secret Healer	Yo-kwang		
2017	Ruby Ruby Love	Na Ji-suk		
2017	Go Back	Go Dok-jae		
2018	Welcome to Waikiki	Lee Joon-ki		
2018	Suits	Park Joon-pyo	Cameo (Episode 1–2)	
2018	Partners for Justice	Cha Soo-ho		
2018	Children of Nobody	Kang Ji-heon		
2019	Welcome to Waikiki 2	Lee Joon-ki		
2019	Partners for Justice 2	Cha Soo-ho	Cameo (Episode 31)	
2019	Hotel del Luna	Yu Oh	Cameo (Episode 6)	
2019	Drama Stage – My Wife's Bed	Sim Jung-woo	One act-drama	
2020–2021	Royal Secret Agent	Park Chun-Sam		
2021	Monthly Magazine Home	Min-guk	Cameo (Episode 14)	
2022	Curtain Call	Park No-kwang	Cameo	
2023	My Dearest	Farmer	Part 2; Cameo (Episode 12)	
2024	Marry My Husband	Park Min-hwan		
2024	Face Me	Han Woo-jin		
2024	Marry You	Bong Cheol-hee		
2025	Confidence Queen	Yoo Myung-min	Special appearance	
2026	Oh! My Guard	Han Jung-woo		

=== Web series ===
Year	Title	Role	Notes	Ref.
2022	X of Crisis	Woo-jin		
2024	My Arti Film	Himself	Episode: "Buttons"	

=== Television shows ===
Year	Title	Role	Notes	Ref.
2011	Guys Make Wonder			
2011	Hangul Train Chipo			
2011	Star Audition: The Great Birth			
2015	Law of the Jungle in Yap Islands	Cast member		
2015	Real Men Season 2	Cast member		
2016	Tribe of Hip Hop	Contestant		
2017	King of Mask Singer	Contestant	as "A Gentleman in Rome, Gregory Peck" (Episode 97)	
2017	Battle Trip	Contestant	with Lee Ki-woo (Episodes 42–45)	
2018	It's Dangerous Beyond the Blankets	Cast member		
2018	Pocha Beyond Borders	Cast member		
2019	Player 7	Cast member		
2021	Painting Thieves	Cast member		
2021–2022	Tteokbokki House That Brother	Cast member	with Jee Seok-jin and Kim Jong-min	
2021–present	I'm Solo	Host	Season 1–8	
2022	legendfestival	Participant		
2022	2022 DIMF Musical Star	Host		
2022–2023	Late Night Ghost Talk Season 2	Host		
2022–present	Brave Detectives	Host	Season 1–2	
2022-2025	Hangout with Yoo	Cast member	Episode 150–304	
2023	Authorized Personnel Only	Cast member	with Yang Se-hyung and Kim Jong-kook	
2023	Tomorrow's Winning Shot	Host		
2024	Country Life of Gen-Z	Cast member		

=== Web shows ===
Year	Title	Role	Ref.
2021	The Lotto King	Host	
2022	Zero-Sum Game	Host	

=== Radio shows ===
Year	Title	Role	Note	Ref.
2021	Kim Young-chul's Power FM	Special DJ	July 5–9	

=== Music video appearances ===
Year	Song title	Artist	Ref.
2011	"Do U Like Me"	M.I.B	
2012	"Alone"	Jung Key feat. Kim Na-young	
2015	"Love You" (가슴뛰도록)	SG Wannabe	
2015	"Good Memory" (좋은 기억)	SG Wannabe	
2016	"I Don't Want"	Jung Key feat. Lee So-jung	
2022	"Beautiful Starry Night" (아름답던 별들의 밤)	KCM	
2022	"I'm Taking Moongchi to My Place" (뭉치는 우리 집으로 데려갈게)	Midnight (Jahyeon, Minjeong)	
2024	"Easy Lover" (아니라고 말해줘)	JYP	

=== Hosting ===
Year	Title	Notes	Ref.
2022	2022 MBC Entertainment Awards	with Jun Hyun-moo and Kang Min-kyung	

== Musical ==
Year	Title		Role	Ref.
Year	English	Korean	Role	Ref.
2016	Alta Boys	알타보이즈	Matthew	
2022	Crash Landing on You	사랑의 불시착	Gu Seung-jun / Alberto Gu	

== Discography ==
=== Singles ===
Title	Year	Album
"Our Feeling" (Lee Yoon Chan feat. Kim Min-jae, Park So-dam & Lee Yi-kyung)	2015	My First Time OST
"Waikiki (Actors Ver.)" (with Kim Seon-ho and Shin Hyun-soo)	2019	Welcome to Waikiki 2 OST
"Leave Work on Time" (칼퇴근)	2020	Non-album single
"With Your Love"	2022	Late Night Cafe : Missing Honey OST

== Awards and nominations ==
Name of the award ceremony, year presented, category, nominee of the award, and the result of the nomination
Award ceremony	Year	Category	Nominee / Work	Result	Ref.
Asia Artist Awards	2025	Best Choice – Actor	Lee Yi-kyung	Won	
Asia Model Awards	2018	Rising Star	Lee Yi-kyung	Won	
Baeksang Arts Awards	2024	Best Supporting Actor – Television	Marry My Husband	Nominated	
Blue Dragon Series Awards	2023	Best New Male Entertainer	Zero-Sum Game	Nominated	
Buil Film Awards	2018	Best New Actor	Baby Beside Me	Nominated	
KBS Drama Awards	2021	Best Supporting Actor	Royal Secret Agent	Won	
Korea Drama Awards	2014	Best New Actor	My Love from the Star	Nominated	
Korea Film Actors Association Awards	2015	Best New Actor	Lee Yi-kyung	Won	
MBC Drama Awards	2018	Excellence Award, Actor in a Wednesday-Thursday Miniseries	Children of Nobody	Nominated	
MBC Entertainment Awards	2022	Rookie Award, Variety Category – Male	Hangout with Yoo	Nominated	
MBC Entertainment Awards	2022	Popularity Award (Music & Talk)	Hangout with Yoo	Won	
MBC Entertainment Awards	2022	Best Couple Award	Lee Yi-kyung (with Lee Mi-joo); Hangout with Yoo	Nominated	
MBC Entertainment Awards	2023	Excellence Award (Male Category)	Lee Yi-kyung	Nominated	
MBC Entertainment Awards	2023	Popularity Award (Show/Variety)	One Top (with Yoo Jae-suk, Haha, Joo Woo-jae, Young K (Day6), and Kim Jong-min); Hangout with Yoo	Won	
