= Fire in Hell =

- Film poster
- Directed by: Lee Sang-woo
- Screenplay by: Lee Sang-woo
- Produced by: Heo Sang-rye
- Starring: Won Tae-hee; Cha Seung-min
- Edited by: Lee Sang-woo
- Music by: Kang Min-kook
- Release dates: April 2012 (JIFF); November 6, 2014 (South Korea)
- Running time: 99 minutes
- Country: South Korea
- Language: Korean

Fire in Hell (Korean: 지옥화; RR: Jiokhwa) is a 2012 South Korean drama film written and directed by South Korean indie provocateur Lee Sang-woo. Based on a true story, it made its world premiere at the 13th Jeonju International Film Festival and its international premiere at the 34th Moscow International Film Festival in 2012.

== Synopsis ==
Ji-wol (Won Tae-hee), a Buddhist monk, is banished from his temple for sexual misconduct with a female devotee. He returns home, but ends up raping Yeon-seo (Cha Seung-min) and accidentally killing her. Guilt-ridden, he travels to Philippines to return Yeon-seo's ashes to her family.

== Cast ==
- Won Tae-hee as Ji-wol
- Cha Seung-min as Yeon-hwa/Yeon-seo
- Kim Hun as Yong-hae
- Song Jin-yeol as Pastor
- Lee Yong-nyeo as Ji-wol's mother
- Lee Tae-rim as Ji-won
- Lee Sang-woo as Zealot 1
- Song Jin-yeol
