= Hideo Jojo =

Japanese film director and scriptwriter (born 1975)

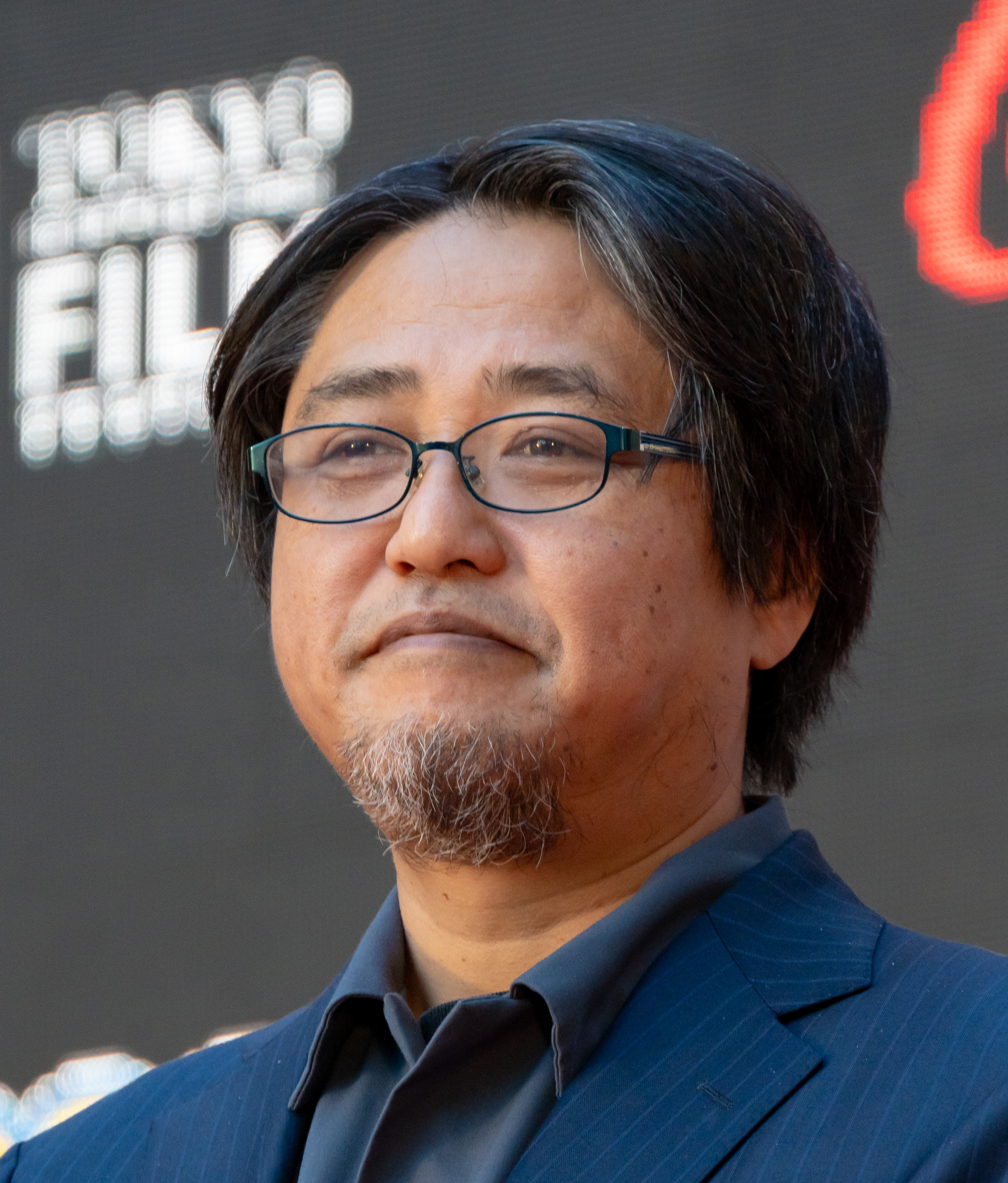
Hideo Jōjō in 2023

Hideo Jōjō (Japanese: 城定 秀夫, Hepburn: Jōjō Hideo; born September 2, 1975) is a Japanese film director and scriptwriter.

== Partial filmography ==
As director

- Natsu Left Home (2014)
- Hitozuma sekando bājin watashi o osotte kudasai (人妻セカンドバージン 私を襲って下さい) (2013)
- AV Idol (2012)
- Homeless as Junior High School Student (2008)
- Siren X (妖女伝説セイレーンＸ～魔性の誘惑～, Yojo Densetsu Seiren X – Masho no Yuwaku) (2008)
- Cream Lemon: After the Dream (2006)
- Married Women Who Want a Taste (2003)
- Dangerous Drugs of Sex (2020)
- On the Edge of Their Seats (2020)
- Love Nonetheless (2022)
- To Be Killed by a High School Girl (2022)
- Believers (2022)
- Nighttime Warbles (2022)
- Thorns of Beauty (2023)
- Twilight Cinema Blues (2023)
- Afterschool Anglers Club (2023)
- S-Friends (2023)
- S-Friends 2 (2023)
- A Bad Summer (2025)
- Welcome to the Village (2025)
- Shinu Hodo Aishite (2025)
- S-Friends 3 (2025)
- S-Friends 4 (2025)
- Nameless (2026)
- Beasts Clutching at Straws (2026)
- Ame no Etranger (2026)

== Awards ==
Year	Award	Category	Work(s)	Result	Ref.
2021	42nd Yokohama Film Festival	Best Director	On the Edge of Their Seats and Dangerous Drugs of Sex	Won	
