= Kim Tae-yong (director, born 1987) =

South Korean filmmaker (born 1987)

- Born: March 20, 1987 (age 39); Busan, South Korea
- Education: Sejong University - Department of Film Arts
- Occupations: Film director, screenwriter

Korean name
- Hangul: 김태용
- RR: Gim Taeyong
- MR: Kim T'aeyong

Kim Tae-yong (Korean: 김태용; born March 20, 1987) is a South Korean film director and screenwriter. Kim got into filmmaking before he turned 20 years old, after watching and inspired by the film The Son by directors Jean-Pierre and Luc Dardenne.

His directorial feature debut Set Me Free (2014), critically acclaimed for its stable scriptwriting and direction, is based on his own story.

== Filmography ==
- As Children (short film, 2005) - director
- Twenty's Wind (short film, 2005) - director
- You Can Count on Me (short film, 2006) - director
- Solongos (short film, 2007) - director
- Exhausted (2009) - assistant director
- Frozen Land (short film, 2010) - director, screenwriter
- Social Service Agent (short film, 2011) - director, screenwriter, editor
- Night Market (short film, 2012) - director
- Night Bugs (short film, 2012) - director, screenwriter
- Spring Fever (short film, 2013) - director, screenwriter
- One Summer Night (short film, 2014) - director, screenwriter
- One Night Only (short film, 2014) - director
- Romance in Seoul (episode 4: "Spring Fever") (2014) - director, screenwriter
- Set Me Free (2014) - director, screenwriter
- Misbehavior (2016) - director, screenwriter
- Number One (2026) - director, screenwriter

== Awards ==
- 2015 35th Korean Association of Film Critics Awards: Best New Director (Set Me Free)
- 2015 36th Blue Dragon Film Awards: Best New Director (Set Me Free)
