= One on One (2014 film) =

2014 South Korean film by Kim Ki-duk

- Directed by: Kim Ki-duk
- Written by: Kim Ki-duk
- Produced by: Kim Ki-duk; Kim Soon-mo
- Starring: Ma Dong-seok; Kim Young-min; Lee Yi-kyung
- Cinematography: Kim Ki-duk
- Edited by: Kim Ki-duk
- Production company: Kim Ki-duk Film
- Release date: May 22, 2014 (South Korea)
- Running time: 122 minutes
- Country: South Korea
- Language: Korean

One on One (Korean: 일대일; RR: Ildaeil) is a 2014 South Korean film directed by Kim Ki-duk. It was the opening film of the 11th Venice Days sidebar at the 71st Venice International Film Festival.

At the 2014 Busan International Film Festival, Kim said during a stage interview that the film "is based on an incident that took place in recent years menacing democratic rights, but nobody ― no film critic or journalist ― has written a film review mentioning it," then offered ₩10 million to the one who guesses correctly.

== Plot ==
On May 9, a high school girl named Oh Min-ju is brutally murdered. Afterwards, the seven suspects are hunted down by seven members of a terrorist group called "Shadow."

== Cast ==
- Ma Dong-seok as Leader of Shadow
- Kim Young-min as Oh Hyeon
- Lee Yi-kyung as Shadow 1
- Jo Dong-in as Shadow 2
- Teo Yoo as Shadow 3
- Ahn Ji-hye as Shadow 4
- Jo Jae-ryong as Shadow 5
- Kim Joong-ki as Shadow 6
- Joo Hee-joong as Jeong Yi-se
- Choi Gwi-hwa as Oh Ji-ha
- Hwang Geon as Oh Jeong-taek
- Yoo Yeon-soo as Jin Ho-seong
- Son Jong-hak as Byeon Oh-gu
- Lim Hwa-young as Ji-hye
- Kim Jong-gu as Military general
- Lee Na-ra as Oh Ji-ha's wife
