= Lee Jae-joon =

South Korean actor and model

- Born: 20 October 1990 (age 35); Seoul, South Korea
- Occupations: Actor; model
- Agent: Y1 Entertainment
- Spouse: Unknown (m. 2025)

Korean name
- Hangul: 이재준
- RR: I Jaejun
- MR: I Chaejun

Lee Jae-joon (Korean: 이재준; born 20 October 1990) is a South Korean actor and model. Lee received favourable reviews for his first lead coming-of-age film Night Flight (2014) for which he was nominated Best New Actor at the 2nd Wildflower Film Awards and making his name known as a rising star.

== Personal life ==
On January 23, 2025, Lee announced that he got married on January 19 after dating for two years.

== Filmography ==
=== Television series ===
Year	Title	Role	Ref.
2013	Dating Agency: Cyrano	Seo Byung-hoon (young)	
2015	The Lover	Lee Joon-jae	
2015	Second 20s	Dan	
2015	Sweet Home, Sweet Honey	Kang Ma-roo	
2017	Save Me	Dae-shik	
2021	Now, We Are Breaking Up	Pete Park	
2023	Like Flowers in Sand	Kwak Jin-soo	

=== Web series ===
Year	Title	Role	Ref.
2021	So Not Worth It	Il Seop	

=== Film ===
Year	Title	Role
2014	Night Flight	Han Ki-woong
2014	Set Me Free	Preacher
2015	The Beauty Inside	Woo-jin

=== Variety show ===
Year	Title	Role
2017	Rural Police (Season 2)	Cast member
2018	The Ultimate Watchlist	Main host

== Awards and nominations ==
Year	Award	Category	Nominated work	Result
2015	2nd Wildflower Film Awards	Best New Actor	Night Flight	Nominated
