= White Night (2012 film) =

- Film poster
- Hangul: 백야
- RR: Baegya
- MR: Paegya
- Directed by: Lee-Song Hee-il
- Written by: Lee-Song Hee-il
- Produced by: Kim Il-kwon
- Starring: Kim Hyun-sung; Lee Yi-kyung; Won Tae-hee
- Cinematography: Yoon Ji-yoon
- Edited by: Lee-Song Hee-il
- Music by: Chris Garneau; Lee Young-hoon
- Production company: Cinema DAL
- Release dates: April 2012 (Jeonju); November 15, 2012 (South Korea)
- Running time: 75 minutes
- Country: South Korea
- Language: Korean

White Night (Korean: 백야) is a Korean drama film about a homosexual man returning to Korea with unresolved past conflicts, who spends time with a new man.

The film premiered at the 2012 Jeonju International Film Festival.

== Plot ==
The plot appears to follow a man who returns to Korea for one night. He has been away for two years. At a cafe, he meets up with a past love or friend he left behind when he left Korea. The mustached man is still upset about the past event, and perhaps also by him having left. He claims that he is involved with someone different, as does the main character - "a 35 year old in Germany". Equally wounded, tears begin to form in the eye of the main character, and he abruptly leaves the cafe without saying goodbye, when his friend or past love goes back in to make another order.

Later in the evening, he is approached by a man in an orange jacket. They seem to be acquainted through the internet and their communications escalate towards a sexual nature. The man in orange notices a scar on the back of the main character's shoulder. The main character becomes tentative and touchy, and decides suddenly he does not want to do anything sexual anymore, however, he still wants his company, and so after some small bickering, they head to a bar.

Suddenly the main character recognises a man in the bar, and chases after him, as they run through urban streets. The man in orange follows, despite not understanding the situation. It is later revealed that the main character was stabbed in a homophobic attack, and the man he chased after knows the man who stabbed him, and his current location - the pool hall. The man he met at the cafe in the beginning was also attacked. The main character states it is the reason he left Korea, as it shook his life up, and outed his sexuality publicly, leaving him stigmatised and outcast. They both head to the pool hall, despite the man in orange's discouragement, and together they punch up the man who stabbed him a long time ago.

Afterwards, despite shallow bickering between them, and not being comfortable being open about their emotions, it becomes clear they feel affection and compassion towards one another. They head to a park and discuss their pasts. This time, when asked, the main character states he is seeing "a 24 year old in Germany," which would seem to imply he has lied both times and therefore is actually single - too hurt to become close to anyone since. The man in orange reveals his name to the other, Lee Tae Joon. They have sex and before parting ways, Lee Tae Joon gives him his number. Also, he learns the main character's name only then: Kang Won Gyu. The film ends on a cliffhanger with Kang Won Gyu staring at a payphone from a taxi, thinking about calling Lee Tae Joon.

== Cast ==
- Kim Hyun-sung as Do Yoon
- Lee Yi-kyung as Lee Tae Joon
- Won Tae-hee as Kang Won Kyu
