= Dangerous Drugs of Sex =

Japanese manga series

- Cover of the Japanese version of vol. 1, first published on February 19, 2019

性の劇薬 (Sei no Gekiyaku)
- Genre: Boys' love
- Manga
- Written by: Yuki Mizuta
- Published by: Magazine Magazine
- Imprint: Wow! Comics Pierce Series
- Magazine: Boys Fan
- Original run: June 21, 2018 – present
- Volumes: 2
- Live-action film
- Directed by: Hideo Jojo
- Written by: Hideo Jojo
- Music by: Guido Hayashi
- Released: February 14, 2020
- Runtime: 89 min.

Dangerous Drugs of Sex (Japanese: 性の劇薬, Hepburn: Sei no Gekiyaku), titled Sei no Gekiyaku: Midara ni Kaihatsu Sareru Karada (性の劇薬～淫らに開発される身体～; lit. "Dangerous Drugs of Sex: The Indecently Developed Body) during serialization, is a Japanese manga series written and illustrated by Yuki Mizuta. It was serialized in the digital manga magazine Boys Fan from June to December 2018. A live-action film adaptation was released in theaters on February 14, 2020.

== Plot ==
Makoto Katsuragi is an elite office worker who has fallen from his perfect life with the sudden death of his parents, being forced to resign from his job, and his girlfriend leaving him. In a drunken stupor, he impulsively decides to commit suicide. Before he is able to jump off a building, he is rescued by a mysterious man named Ryūji Yoden, who demands he forfeit his life to him, forcing him into a life of confinement and sadomasochistic training. As Katsuragi experiences pain and pleasure that forces him to realize he's alive, he comes to fall in love with Yoden and reconsiders dying.

== Media ==
=== Manga ===
Dangerous Drugs of Sex is written and illustrated by Yuki Mizuta. It is serialized in digital manga magazine Boys Fan from June 21, 2018, to December 20, 2018. The chapters were later released in one bound volume by Magazine Magazine under the Junet Comics Pierce Series imprint.

No.	Title	Japanese release date	Japanese ISBN
1	Sei no Gekiyaku (性の劇薬)	February 19, 2019	978-4-9094-6076-9
2	Sei no Gekiyaku Re:life (性の劇薬 Re:life)	September 16, 2022	978-4-910582-10-8

=== Film adaptation ===
A live-action film adaptation was announced in April 2019 starring Sho Watanabe and Takashi Kitadai. Additional cast members include Kouhei Nagano, Ruri Shinato, Seiki Chiba, Sousuke Yamamoto, and Fumio Moriya. The film was directed and written by Hideo Jojo. Jojo claimed that the film would be the first boys' love film with an R18 rating. The film was first screened on February 14, 2020, at Ikebukuro Cinema Rosa. After it was screened privately for two weeks, it was later released in Japanese theaters nationwide on March 6, 2020.

Dangerous Drugs of Sex premiered internationally at the Bucheon International Fantastic Film Festival on July 11 and July 14, 2020. It was also entered into the 2020 Taiwan International Queer Film Festival and Wicked Queer. The film later released on Netflix in Japan on July 14, 2020.

== Reception ==
Dangerous Drugs of Sex sold 1 million digital copies by 2019.

Gay writer Mochigi reviewed the film adaptation favorably, claiming that it was enjoyable for audiences regardless of sexuality. He stated that aside from the film's erotic elements, it also portrayed depth towards the characters instead of reducing them to simply pornographic roles, citing the scenes of Katsuragi's social life. Kee Chang from Anthem stated the film "asked a lot of its audience."
