= Night Flight (2014 film) =

- Theatrical poster
- Directed by: Leesong Hee-il
- Written by: Leesong Hee-il
- Produced by: Kim Il-kwon
- Starring: Kwak Si-yang; Lee Jae-joon
- Cinematography: Yun Ji-woon
- Edited by: Leesong Hee-il
- Production company: Cinema DAL
- Distributed by: Finecut
- Release dates: February 7, 2014 (Berlin); August 28, 2014 (South Korea)
- Running time: 141 minutes (director's cut); 133 minutes
- Country: South Korea
- Language: Korean
- Box office: US$66,602

Night Flight (Korean: 야간비행; RR: Yaganbihaeng) is a 2014 South Korean drama film written, directed and edited by Leesong Hee-il. It made its world premiere in the Panorama section of the 64th Berlin International Film Festival on February 7, 2014, and was released in theaters in South Korea on August 28, 2014.

== Plot ==
Three teenage boys, Shin Yong-ju, Han Gi-woong and Ko Gi-taek, were best friends in middle school. While Yong-ju and Gi-taek still remain close, Gi-woong becomes a jjang (Korean slang term meaning "best"), one of the strongest fighters in the school, and begins to hang out with Sung-jin's gang (Sung-jin's parents are powerful figures, making him a bigwig among his schoolmates), meaning he draws away from the other two, particularly when Yong-ju becomes concerned when he finds out that Sung-jin's gang is mercilessly bullying Gi-taek, an eccentric manhwa fan.

Under intense pressure to get into a prestigious university because his mother is single and financially struggling, Yong-ju develops an unlikely relationship with Gi-woong, who tries to break away from Sung-jin. However, Gi-woong is not able to accept Yong-ju's love, nor explain why, despite repeatedly seeking out his company. When Gi-taek learns that Yong-ju is gay, he retaliates for a past slight and betrays his friend and joins Sung-jin's gang in ostracizing him, telling them that Yong-ju has loved Gi-woong for years, as evidenced by a photo of Yong-ju and Gi-woong, with the former's arm around Gi-woong's shoulder on a day trip they took together.

Gi-woong, having been in search of a man recently released from prison who is initially unidentified to the viewer, finds the elusive figure, who turns out to be his father. The source of Gi-woong's deep-seated pain comes to light as he expresses anger at his father for committing a crime of protest, having left Gi-woong and his mother to fend for themselves during his incarceration. Their reunion ends with an apology and emotional hug, signifying that a wound inside Gi-woong is beginning to heal.

Sung-jin's group begins to bully Yong-ju, stealing the memory card from his camera after recording a degrading video on it of Sung-jin sexually assaulting a helpless Yong-ju. Upon hearing this, Gi-woong storms the school demanding that the memory card be returned, severely injuring several students and teachers before being hit with the leg of a chair by Sung-jin. Yong-ju carries the unconscious Gi-woong to receive medical help. Later, he decides to drop out of school, then visits Gi-woong in the hospital, retrieving the memory card from Gi-woong's pocket and finding two train tickets they had purchased once when planning to run away together. While the two are finally able to hold each other in an accepting embrace, Yong-ju reveals he is transferring to a distant school in the provinces, and guesses Gi-woong will have to serve a short prison sentence. The film ends with the two sitting on the edge of the hospital bed, holding each other, and crying as they realize that despite their growth and mutual intense feelings, they will not be able to be together.

== Cast ==
- Kwak Si-yang as Shin Yong-joo
- Lee Jae-joon as Han Ki-woong
- Choi Joon-ha as Ko Ki-taek
- Kim Chang-hwan as Oh Sung-jin
- Lee Ik-joon as Song Joon-woo
- Park Mi-hyun as Yong-joo's mother
- Kim So-hee as Ki-woong's mother
- Lee Gun-hee as Jae-ho
- Yoon Gun-il as Bum-jin
- Lee Seo-won as Jong-pil
- Song Ji-ho as Jae-yeon
- Park Jin-ah as Hyun-joo
- Ok Joo-ri as Ki-taek's mother
- Pyo Jin-ki as Jin-ki
- Kim Sun-bin as Dean of students
- Hyun Sung as Homeroom teacher
- Park Hyuk-kwon as Big guy
- Jung In-gi as Ki-woong's father
- Lee Yi-kyung as Student part-timer

== Production ==
Leesong Hee-il is Korea's top queer cinema director, and this was his fourth feature. He said he found the motif of the film from a CCTV video clip, which showed a high school student crying in an elevator just before he killed himself. After seeing that, Leesong decided to make a film exploring teenage sexual minorities and the dehumanization they face in order to survive the bullying and violence they experience at school.

== Film festivals ==
Besides the Berlinale, Night Flight also screened at the 38th Hong Kong International Film Festival, the 7th CinemAsia Film Festival in Amsterdam, the 29th Torino GLBT Film Festival, the 15th Jeonju International Film Festival, the 68th Edinburgh International Film Festival, the 47th Sitges Film Festival, the 34th Hawaii International Film Festival, and the 25th Stockholm International Film Festival.

== Awards and nominations ==
Year	Award	Category	Recipient	Result
2014	7th CinemAsia Film Festival	Jury Award	Night Flight	Won
2015	2nd Wildflower Film Awards	Best Director (Narrative Film)	Leesong Hee-il	Nominated
2015	2nd Wildflower Film Awards	Best Actor	Kwak Si-yang	Nominated
2015	2nd Wildflower Film Awards	Best Actor	Lee Jae-joon	Nominated
