= Set Me Free (2014 film) =

- Theatrical poster
- Directed by: Kim Tae-yong
- Written by: Kim Tae-yong
- Produced by: Pyeon Kyung-woo
- Starring: Choi Woo-shik; Kim Su-hyeon
- Cinematography: Kim Soo-min
- Edited by: Kim Mi-young; Jo Hyo-jung
- Music by: Kim Woo-geun
- Distributed by: CJ Entertainment
- Release date: November 13, 2014
- Running time: 108 minutes
- Country: South Korea
- Language: Korean
- Box office: US$158,070

Set Me Free (Korean: 거인; RR: Geoin) is a 2014 South Korean autobiographical coming-of-age film directed by Kim Tae-yong. Choi Woo-shik won Actor of the Year at the 19th Busan International Film Festival, where the film also received the Citizen Critics' Award. Set Me Free was released in theaters on November 13, 2014, and drew 23,979 admissions.

== Plot ==
Yeong-jae grew up at Isaac's Home, a group home where he was entrusted as a child by his immature and reckless father. Now a sixteen-year-old high school student, he is told that he is now too old to remain at the group home. Yeong-jae will do anything than return to his father, so to extend his stay, he lies that he wants to become a priest and enter a Catholic boarding school. In fact, Yeong-jae doesn't believe in God, having learned to rely only on himself, and even secretly steals then resells donated goods. To show his religious faith, he attends mass regularly while fawning over the facility director and curate. Beom-tae, Yeong-jae's only friend at the home, disapproves of this insincerity, but he also understands since he himself has reached the home's maximum age. Having found nowhere else to go, Yeong-jae gets so desperate to stay that in the face of the director's growing suspicion of him, Yeong-jae turns his back on Beom-tae. Then one day, his father visits the group home, this time to leave his younger brother Min-jae there, and Yeong-jae's rage and despair reaches its breaking point.

== Cast ==
- Choi Woo-shik as Yeong-jae
- Kim Su-hyeon as Chang-won
- Jang Yoo-sang as Min-jae
- Kang Shin-chul as Director
- Shin Jae-ha as Beom-tae
- Park Joo-hee as Yoon-mi
- Lee Min-ah as Chang-won's mother-in-law
- Park Keun-rok as Curate
- Park Myung-shin as Yoon-mi's mother
- Kim Jae-hwa as Yeong-jae's mother
- Seo Gil-ja as Yeong-jae's aunt
- Yang Ik-june as Beom-tae's father
- Yoon Seung-hoon as Homeroom teacher
- Bang Eun-jung as Choir member
- Lee Jae-joon as Preacher

== Awards and nominations ==
Year	Award	Category	Recipient	Result
2014	19th Busan International Film Festival	Citizen Critics' Award	Set Me Free	Won
2014	19th Busan International Film Festival	Actor of the Year	Choi Woo-shik	Won
2015	10th Max Movie Awards	Best New Actor	Choi Woo-shik	Nominated
2015	2nd Wildflower Film Awards	Best New Actor	Choi Woo-shik	Won
2015	20th Chunsa Film Art Awards	Best New Director	Kim Tae-yong	Nominated
2015	24th Buil Film Awards	Best New Director	Kim Tae-yong	Nominated
2015	24th Buil Film Awards	Best New Actor	Choi Woo-shik	Nominated
2015	35th Korean Association of Film Critics Awards	Best New Actor	Choi Woo-shik	Won
2015	35th Korean Association of Film Critics Awards	Best New Director	Kim Tae-yong	Won
2015	36th Blue Dragon Film Awards	Best New Director	Kim Tae-yong	Won
2015	36th Blue Dragon Film Awards	Best New Actor	Choi Woo-shik	Won
2015	16th Busan Film Critics Awards	Best New Actor	Choi Woo-shik	Won
2015	The Korea Film Actors Association Awards	Popular Actor Award	Choi Woo-shik	Won
