= Lee-Song Hee-il =

South Korean film director (born 1971)

- Born: 1971 (age 54–55); South Korea
- Occupation: Film director

Lee-Song Hee-il (Korean: 이송희일; Hanja: 李宋喜一; born 1971) is a South Korean film director whose first feature film No Regret is regarded as "the first real Korean gay feature." The film won him Best Independent Film Director at the 2006 Director's Cut Awards. Lee-Song is openly gay.

== Filmography ==
- Sugar Hill (2000)
- Good Romance (2001)
- Four Letter Words (2002)
- Say That You Want To Fuck With Me (2003)
- Camellia Project (2004)
- No Regret (2006)
- Break Away (2010)
- Going South (2012)
- Suddenly, Last Summer (2012)
- White Night (2012)
- Night Flight (2014)
- Swallow (2022)
