= Yuna Kim in the media =

Yuna Kim is a former competitive figure skater from South Korea. She is the 2010 Olympic champion, the 2014 Olympic silver medalist, a two-time World champion (2009, 2013), the 2009 Four Continents champion, a three-time Grand Prix Final champion, the 2006 World Junior champion, the 2005 Junior Grand Prix Final champion, and a six-time South Korean national champion. Outside of figure skating, she has been active in a variety of fields, including music, television, and modelling. Formerly one of the highest-paid female athletes in the world, Kim has received numerous endorsements and is one of the most sought-after advertising models in South Korea. She is also a philanthropist and is recognised for her work with UNICEF, for whom she serves as a goodwill ambassador.

== Cultural impact ==
In 2010, Grammy award-winning singer Rihanna remarked that it was a "great honour" for her that Kim had used her song "Please Don't Stop the Music" for a gala program. In 2012, acclaimed Australian actor Hugh Jackman, upon hearing that Kim was skating to a song from the Les Misérables soundtrack, proclaimed that Kim was the “best”. Jackman, who was taking questions after a press screening in Seoul, invited Kim and six of her closest friends to watch the film with him, in case she needed to “get some inspiration" or "listen to the music.” In 2020, Academy Award-winning director of Parasite, Bong Joon-ho, mentioned Kim as one of the people he'd like to invite to his "last supper". In 2023, Kim was one of five featured Korean stars in French painter David Jamin's Le Dandy de Provence exhibition at The Hyundai in Seoul, South Korea.

== Fashion ==
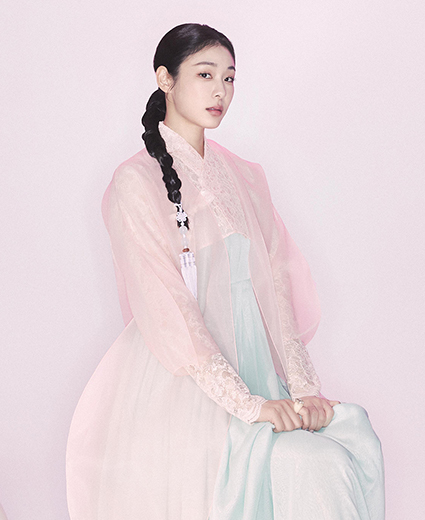
Kim wearing hanbok that she helped design for the event Hanbok Wave.

By 2009, Kim was considered a fashion and beauty icon among her peers, with items she was seen wearing getting an instant upgrade in terms of status. On March 13, 2013, Kim was pictured wearing Dior's Addict Lip Glow while awaiting the draw for the short program at the 2013 World Championships, causing the sales of the lip balm to increase from 1000 units a day to more than 3000 units a day. By the day of the free skate, the lip balm had risen to the top of major search portals, and came to be known as "Yuna Kim's lipstick". Kim is an ambassador for Dior. She attended Dior's Fall 2022 show held in Seoul, their first ever show in South Korea.

In 2022, Kim helped design a collection of hanbok, or Korean traditional dress, inspired by her "personality and image", in collaboration with ten hanbok brands. The designs were showcased in a London fashion show titled Hanbok Wave, held at the Korean Cultural Centre during London Fashion Week. The show was hosted by the Ministry of Culture, Sports and Tourism and the Korea Craft and Design Foundation, with the goal of promoting hanbok internationally. A video of the event appeared on the Victoria and Albert Museum's exhibition website for Hallyu! The Korean Wave. The hanbok worn by Kim was also featured in a photoshoot with Marie Claire, and a video of her wearing hanbok during the photoshoot was displayed on electronic billboards in Times Square.

Kim has been featured on the cover page of many top fashion magazines, including the Korean edition of Vogue. The Korean edition of Harper's Bazaar put her on the cover of its November 2019 issue with the title "The Queen".

== Endorsements and commercials ==
Among Kim's official sponsors are Kookmin Bank, Nike, Korean Air, Samsung and Hyundai Motor Company. Her other endorsements include Anycall (mobile phone), Hauzen (air conditioner), Lac Vert (cosmetics), Maeil Dairies Co. Ltd (dairy products), Maxim (coffee), Saffron (fabric softener), Tous Les Jours (bakery), J. Estina (jewelry) and Qua (apparel).

Kim has appeared in many commercials in South Korea. Her commercial for a new touchscreen haptic phone from Samsung Electronics, dubbed "Yuna's Haptic" (SPH-W7700), sold over one million devices in a record seven months. During the 2010 Winter Olympics, Forbes magazine named Kim, along with American snowboarder Shaun White, as the top-earning athletes participating in the Olympics with $7.5 million each to their name. In August 2010, Forbes magazine listed her as one of the highest-paid female athletes in the world, with annual earnings of $9.7 million.

Since her retirement, Kim has continued to dominate the commercial scene and remains an advertising giant in South Korea. Kim is said to earn 1 billion to 1.4 billion South Korean won (US$930,000 to US$1,300,000) per advertisement.

== Philanthropy and activism ==
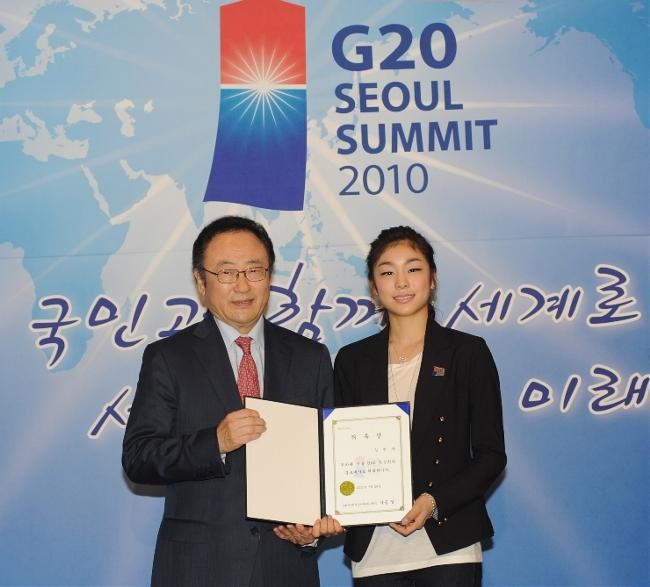
Kim at the 2010 G-20 Seoul summit

Kim has donated more than 5 billion won to various charitable causes, as of February 2022. In July 2010, she was named an international UNICEF Goodwill Ambassador, with a stated aim of helping vulnerable children around the world. In September 2010, she was invited to the United Nations' New York headquarters to mark the annual International Day of Peace celebration alongside high level UN officials, including UN Secretary-General Ban Ki-moon, and Goodwill Ambassadors representing other branches of the United Nations. There, she advocated peace messages on behalf of UNICEF. Kim is a member of UNICEF's Honors Club, a group for major donors. She was named an ambassador for the 2010 G-20 Seoul summit alongside actress Han Hyo-joo and soccer player representative Park Ji-sung. First lady Kim Yoon-ok appointed her an ambassador for the 2010–2012 Visit Korea Year, promoting Korean tourism as part of a three year campaign.

Kim has funded multiple scholarships for aspiring figure skaters in South Korea, and donated the proceeds from her 2011 duet with IU, "Ice Flower", to the national figure skating team. She commented: "I know how hard it is to be a skater. Even if there were a young, talented skater, she might be forced to give up skating because of financial trouble. I'd like to help her and others reach their goals." Kim donated the prize money from the 2011 World Championships to children affected by the 2011 Japan earthquake; the competition had been scheduled to be held in Japan before being reassigned to Russia as a result of the disaster. She has also aided relief efforts in Nepal, Haiti, the Philippines, Turkey and Syria. In 2014, she donated 100 million won to the families of the victims of the Sewol ferry disaster, in addition to the proceeds from her retirement medal. During the COVID-19 pandemic, she made several donations to help provide vaccines to developing countries and conduct treatment initiatives. On March 7, 2022, Kim donated 100 million won to the Hope Bridge Disaster Relief Association to help the victims of the massive wildfire that started in Uljin, Gyeongbuk and spread to Samcheok, Gangwon.

In September 2022, she participated in a "women roundtable" held at the residence of the US Ambassador in Seoul by Kamala Harris to discuss gender equality, and the stories of Korean women having achieved parity with male rivals in their respective fields. The participants included Naver CEO Choi Soo-yeon, Kim Sagwa, Youn Yuh-jung and the head of the Korean Medical Women's Association Baik Hyun-wook. In December 2022, she was appointed an honorary ambassador for the 60th anniversary of the establishment of diplomatic ties between South Korea and Canada. Kim was selected for the role by the Canadian Embassy in Seoul due to her years spent training in Canada. She participated in various activities throughout 2023 to promote the relationship between the two countries.

== Books and television ==
On January 28, 2010, Kim published a book, Kim Yu-na's Seven-Minute Drama, about her experience with figure skating from the age of seven to her preparation for the 2010 Winter Olympics in Vancouver. The Chosun Ilbo stated that the book "deals with her attempts to overcome her obstacles and to become the world's top figure skater." In addition, she wrote a book called Like Yuna Kim, published on March 30, 2010. This book targets younger readers.

In May 2011, Kim began to host a program called Kim Yuna's Kiss and Cry as part of SBS' Good Sunday. The show depicted ten celebrities learning how to figure skate from professional skaters. The contestants included comedian Kim Byung-man, singers U-Know of TVXQ, Krystal of f(x), IU and Son Dam-bi, actors Park Joon-geum, Seo Ji-seok, Lee Ah-hyun and Jin Ji-hee, and speed skater Lee Kyou-hyuk. The winner of the show was Krystal and her partner Lee Dong-hoon. The runner up was Kim Byung-man and his partner Lee Soo-kyung. As a reward, Krystal and Lee Dong-hoon got to showcase their skating with Kim in the All That Skate exhibition that was held in August 2011. Cha Jun-hwan appeared in this show as a professional skater.

== Discography ==
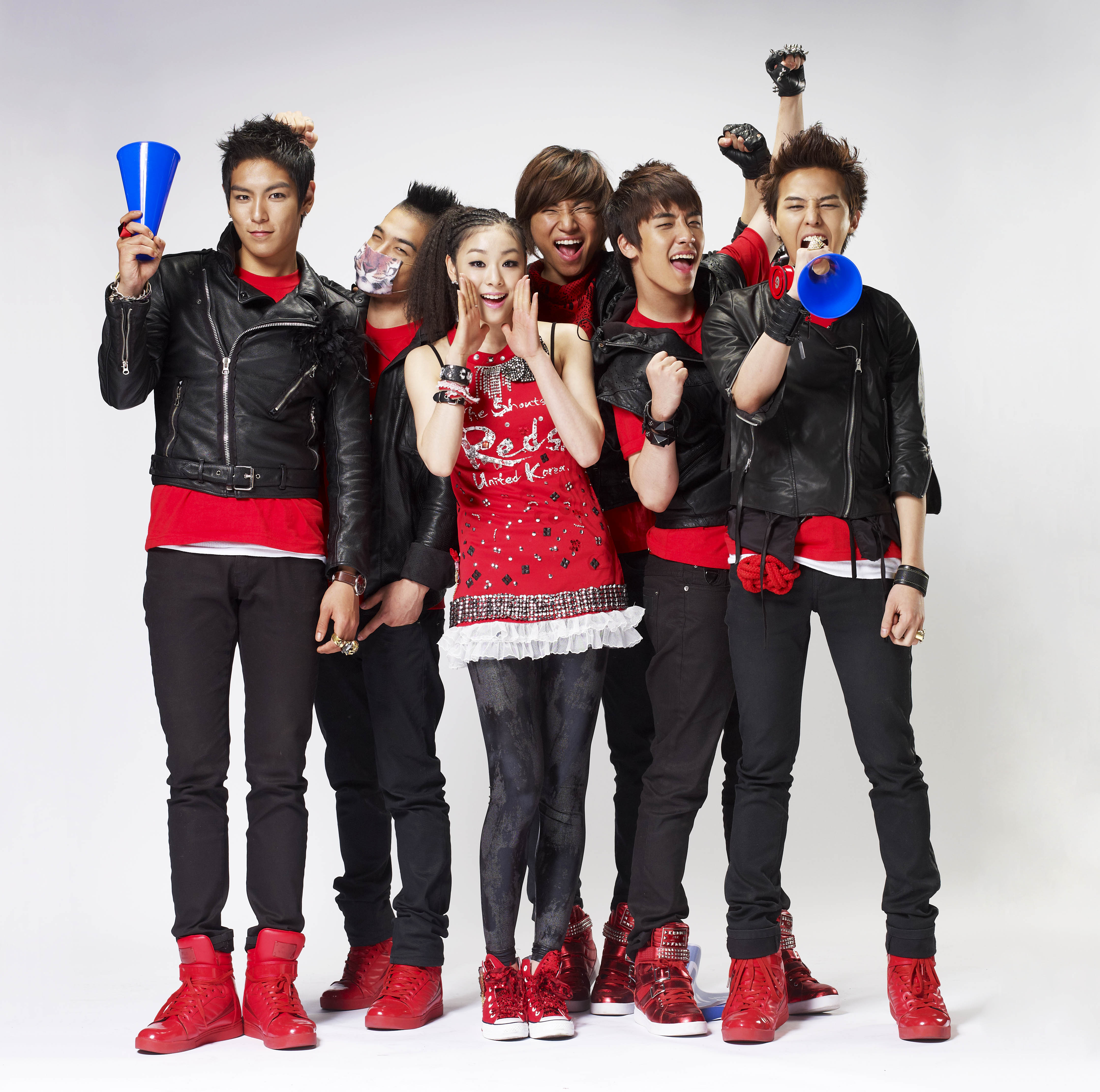
Kim with South Korean boy band BigBang

Kim has worked on several projects as a singer. She recorded a duet with K-pop singer Lee Seung-gi titled "Smile Boy (Rock Ver.)", the 2010 Football World Cup commercial song. She also sang with South Korean band BigBang and rock group Transfixion on the single "The Shouts of Reds Part 2", created for the Korean World Cup soccer team. In 2011, she recorded a duet with IU, titled "Ice Flower", for her television show Kim Yuna's Kiss and Cry. Between 2008 and 2014, Kim released four albums compiling her skating music and other favorites, beginning with Yuna Kim: Fairy on the Ice. The combined sales surpassed 100,000, a rarity for classical music.

=== Singles ===
==== As lead artist ====
List of singles as lead artist, with selected chart positions and sales, showing album name and year released
Title	Year	Peak chart positions	Sales	Album
Title	Year	KOR	Sales	Album
"Smile Boy (Rock Ver.)" (with Lee Seung-gi)	2010	14		Non-album release
"Super Girl" (with Sistar and Electroboyz)	2010	57		Non-album release
"Winter Dream" (꿈의 겨울) (with Lena Park)	2011	62	KOR: 158,650	Non-album release
"Ice Flower" (얼음꽃) (with IU)	2011	8	KOR: 1,733,045	Non-album release

==== As featured artist ====
List of singles as featured artist, with selected chart positions, showing album name and year released
Title	Year	Peak chart positions	Album
Title	Year	KOR	Album
"The Shouts of Reds Part 2" (승리의 함성) (BigBang and Trans Fixion featuring Yuna Kim)	2010	47	Non-album release
"Move Like This" (Note: "Move Like This" was released as a promotional single in collaboration with Gatorade.) (An Yujin and Kang Daniel featuring Yuna Kim)	2022	— (Note: "Move Like This" did not enter the Circle Digital Chart, but peaked at number 25 on the component Circle Download Chart.)	Non-album release
