= Dissolution =

Dissolution may refer to:

== Arts and entertainment ==
- Dissolution, a 2002 novel by Richard Lee Byers in the War of the Spider Queen series
- Dissolution (Sansom novel), by C. J. Sansom, 2003
- Dissolution (Binge novel), by Nicholas Binge, 2025
- Dissolution (Olivia Block album), 2016
- Dissolution (The Pineapple Thief album), 2018
- "Dissolution", a 2001 TV episode of Spaced

== Politics and law ==
- Dissolution (politics), when a state or institution ceases to exist
  - Dissolution of parliament
    - Dissolution of the Parliament of the United Kingdom
- Dissolution (law), any of several events that terminate a legal entity such as a marriage, adoption, corporation, or union
- Dissolution of the Monasteries, in England, Wales and Ireland 1536–1541

== Other uses ==
- Dissolution (chemistry), or solvation, the interaction of a solvent with dissolved molecules

== See also ==
- Dissolve (disambiguation)
