= Dissolve =

Dissolve may refer to:

== Music ==
- Dissolve (band), a musical project of Chris Heaphy and Roy Montgomery
- "Dissolve", a 2015 song by Absofacto
- "Dissolve", a song by Joji from the 2022 album Smithereens
- "Dissolve", a song by Daniel Johns from the 2015 album Talk
- "Dissolve", a song by Hundred Reasons from the 2002 album Ideas Above Our Station
- The Dissolve (album), by Boxcutter, 2011

== Other uses ==
- Solvation, or dissolution, in chemistry
- Dissolve (filmmaking), a type of film transition
- Dissolve (2019 film), a South Korean film
- The Dissolve, a defunct web magazine

== See also ==
- Dissolution (disambiguation)
