= Hwal =

Hwal (Korean, 활 'bow' (weapon), or 'bow' (music)) may refer to:

- Gakgung, the Korean bow
- The Bow (film)
