= Kwak Ji-min =

South Korean actress (born 1985)

- Born: Kwak Sun-hee; February 13, 1985 (age 41); South Korea
- Education: Chung-Ang University (Theater and Film); Jinseon Girls' High School
- Occupation: Actress
- Years active: 2003–present
- Agent: Lions Bridge

Korean name
- Hangul: 곽선희
- RR: Gwak Seonhui
- MR: Kwak Sŏnhŭi

Stage name
- Hangul: 곽지민
- RR: Gwak Jimin
- MR: Kwak Chimin
- Website: kwakjimin.com

Kwak Ji-min (Korean: 곽지민; born February 13, 1985), birth name Kwak Sun-hee (곽선희), is a South Korean actress. She is best known overseas for her leading role in the Kim Ki-duk film Samaritan Girl, for which she won Best New Actress at the 2004 Busan Film Critics Awards.

== Filmography ==
=== Film ===
- And the Sun (short film, 2013)
- My PS Partner (2012) - Ara
- The Wedding Scandal (2012) - Jung-eun/So-eun
- The Beat Goes On (2012) - Jo Ara
- Link (2011) - Park Soo-jung
- Flipping (short film, 2010) - Mi-yong
- Girl by Girl (2007) - Oh Se-ri
- Red Eye (2005) - So-hee
- Samaritan Girl (2004) - Yeo-jin
- Wishing Stairs (2003) - dance class junior

=== Television series ===
- Shining Romance (MBC, 2013) - Oh Yoon-na
- Good Doctor (KBS2, 2013) - Lee Soo-jin (guest, ep 10-12)
- Fantasy Tower (tvN, 2013) - Yoo-mi
- Hur Jun, The Original Story (MBC, 2013) - Gu Un-nyeon
- Phantom (SBS, 2012) - Kwon Eun-seol (guest, ep 7)
- I Am Sam (KBS2, 2007) - Da-bin
- Merry Mary (MBC, 2007) - Choi Bi-dan
- Dasepo Girl: The Series (Super Action, 2006) - Double Eyes
- Lovers in Prague (SBS, 2005) - Jung Yeon-soo
- Love Is All Around (MBS, 2004) - Jin Pa-rang
- Sharp 1 (KBS2, 2004) - Kang Dong-hee
- Honest Living (SBS, 2003) - Da-hyun
- The Bean Chaff of My Life (MBC, 2003)
- Drama City: "My Beautiful First Love" (KBS2, 2003) - young Mi-young

=== Radio program ===
- Dating in the Afternoon with Kwak Ji-min (KFM, 2006)

=== Music video appearances ===
- Lee Jin-sung - "Sorry" (2009)
- Kagerou - "Shiroi Karasu" (2004)

== Theater ==
- The Special Winter (2013)

== Discography ==
Album information	Track listing
Crossover: Single album; Released: September 25, 2009	Track listing: 1. 약한 여자 (Weak Women); 2. Sweet Dream; 3. 약한 여자 (Weak Women) (Inst.); 4. Sweet Dream (Inst.)

== Awards ==
- 2012 20th Korean Culture and Entertainment Awards: Excellence Award, Actress in Film (Wedding Scandal)
- 2004 5th Busan Film Critics Awards: Best New Actress (Samaritan Girl)
