= Manny (TV series) =

- Promotional 6
- Genre: Romance, Comedy
- Written by: Sung Min-ji; Park Jae-hyun
- Directed by: Lee Yong-hae; Park Soo-chul
- Starring: Seo Ji-seok; Choi Jung-yoon; Byun Jung-soo; Jung Da-bin; Goo Seung-hyun
- Country of origin: South Korea
- Original language: Korean
- No. of episodes: 16

Production
- Production companies: CJ E&M; May Contents

Original release
- Network: tvN
- Release: April 13 – June 2, 2011

Manny (Korean: 매니) is a 2011 South Korean romantic comedy television series, starring Seo Ji-seok, Choi Jung-yoon, Byun Jung-soo, Jung Da-bin and Goo Seung-hyun. It aired on tvN from April 13 to June 2, 2011 for 16 episodes.

== Synopsis ==
Kim Yi-han (Seo Ji-seok) is a manny, a male nanny, from New York. Due to some mishaps, he has to find work in South Korea while he is stuck there for a while. Seo Do-young (Choi Jung-yoon) is the divorced mother of Oh Eun-bi (Jung Da-bin) and Oh Jung-min (Goo Seung-hyun). Her children's antics have scared away all former nannies. She works in the fashion industry, living under her elder sister Janice (Byun Jung-soo)'s iron rule. Janice is the somewhat self-centered head of her own modelling agency, pushing herself and all her connections in competing in the field. Circumstances bring them together, and the result is sometimes funny, sometimes serious, and all-round interesting to watch.

== Cast ==
- Seo Ji-seok as Kim Yi-han
- Choi Jung-yoon as Seo Do-young
- Byun Jung-soo as Janice
- Jung Da-bin as Oh Eun-bi
- Goo Seung-hyun as Oh Jung-min
- Kim Sook as Goo Hyun-jung
- Seo Woo-jin as Lee Joon-ki
- Park Joon-hyuk as Eun-bi and Jung-min's father
- Jin Seo-yeon as Shin Gi-roo
- Kim Young as Sang-chul
- Park Hyuk-kwon
- Rottyful Sky as Byun Jang-soo (guest, episode 5)
- Lee Dong-ha as Lee Seung-gi
