= Crocodile (1996 film) =

- Hangul: 악어
- RR: Ageo
- MR: Agŏ
- Directed by: Kim Ki-duk
- Written by: Kim Ki-duk
- Starring: Cho Jae-hyun; Jeon Moo-song; Ahn Jae-hong; Woo Yun-kyeong
- Cinematography: Lee Dong-sam
- Edited by: Park Gok-ji
- Release date: November 16, 1996
- Running time: 102 minutes
- Country: South Korea
- Language: Korean
- Budget: ₩250 million

Crocodile (Korean: 악어) is a 1996 South Korean film. Released on November 16, it was the directorial debut of Kim Ki-duk and stars Cho Jae-hyun as the titular character.

The film tells the story of a man living at the edge of the Han River in Seoul who saves a woman trying to commit suicide. He then proceeds to rape and abuse her until an odd relationship develops between them.
