= Stop (2015 film) =

- Directed by: Kim Ki-duk
- Produced by: Allen Ai; Kim Ki-duk
- Starring: Natsuko Hori; Tsubasa Nakae
- Cinematography: Ki-duk Kim
- Edited by: Ki-duk Kim
- Production company: Kim Ki-duk Film
- Release date: July 9, 2015 (Czech Republic)
- Running time: 85 minutes
- Countries: South Korea; Japan
- Language: Japanese

Stop (Korean: 스톱) is a 2015 South Korean-Japanese co-production directed by Kim Ki-duk that had its premiere at the Karlovy Vary International Film Festival in the Czech Republic. The film is set in Japan and addresses the aftermath of Fukushima-Daichi disaster; the cast of the film is mostly Japanese.

== Plot ==
A young married couple living near the Fukushima nuclear reactor is exposed to radiation by the nuclear accident there. Unsure of what to do, the initially decide to remain in their home. When authorities force them to evacuate, they resettle in Shinjuku. The wife is pregnant, and the couple is consumed with concern that their child will be born disabled due to exposure to radiation. Unsure of whether or not they should keep the child, their emotions run wild.

== Cast ==
- Natsuko Hori as Miki
- Tsubasa Nakae as Sabu
- Allen Ai as lunatic pregnant woman
- Mitsuhiro Takeda
- Daigo Tashiro

== Reception ==
Reviewer Guy Lodge of Variety wrote, "With its erratic, illogical narrative arriving at no conclusion more complex than 'nuclear power is really bad, you guys,' the pic offers few compensatory pleasures in its dashed-off style and uncertain performances. Given that distributor interest has waned over Kim's last few superior features, 'Stop' looks a commercial non-starter."

Ritter Fan of Plano Crítico wrote, "The serious subject matter that Kim Ki-Duk tries to address becomes a complete pastiche in his hands. It's a shame that he simplified something that could have yielded good results so much, especially with his raw filmmaking style."

Rudolf Schimera wrote, "Shot using a handheld camera, renowned Korean director and festival veteran Kim Ki-duk makes no bones about using his raw, highly topical picture as a political tool in the service of the public, setting it against a backdrop of just two individuals and their desperate, claustrophobic situation that will leave the viewer anything but indifferent."
