= Dissolution (politics) =

Political term

Dissolution in politics is when a state, institution, nation, or administrative region dissolves or ceases to exist, usually separating into two or more entities, or being annexed. This can be carried out through armed conflict, legal means, diplomacy, or a combination of any or all of the three. It is similar to dissolution in the legal sense.

It is not to be confused with secession, where a state, institution, nation, or administrative region leaves; nor federalisation where the structure changes but is not dissolved. There have been several dissolutions in history, while others have been proposed or advanced as hypotheticals.

== Historical dissolutions ==
=== Austria-Hungary ===
In 1918, the dissolution of Austria-Hungary was a major geopolitical event that occurred as a result of the growth of internal social contradictions and the separation of different parts of Austria-Hungary. The reason for the collapse of the state was World War I, the 1918 crop failure and the economic crisis.

On October 17, 1918, the Hungarian Parliament terminated the union with Austria and declared the independence of the country, Czechoslovakia was formed on October 28, followed by the emergence of the State of Slovenes, Croats and Serbs on October 29. On November 3, the West Ukrainian People's Republic declared independence; on November 6, Poland was re-established in Kraków. Also during the collapse of the empire, the Republic of Tarnobrzeg, the Hutsul Republic, the Lemko Republic, the Komańcza Republic, the Republic of Prekmurje, the Hungarian Soviet Republic, the Slovak Soviet Republic, the Banat Republic and the Italian Regency of Carnaro arose.

The remaining territories inhabited by divided peoples fell into the composition of existing or newly formed states. Legally, the collapse of the empire was formalized in the Treaty of Saint-Germain-en-Laye with Austria, which also acted as a peace treaty after the First World War, and in the Treaty of Trianon with Hungary.

=== Czechoslovakia ===
The dissolution of Czechoslovakia took effect on 1 January 1993 and was the self-determined split of the federal republic of Czechoslovakia into the independent countries of the Czech Republic and Slovakia. Both mirrored the Czech Socialist Republic and the Slovak Socialist Republic, which had been created in 1969 as the constituent states of the Czech and Slovak Federative Republic.

=== East Germany ===
On 22 July 1990 a law was passed recreating the new states of the former East Germany, which were dissolved by the East German government in 1952. The states are: Brandenburg, Mecklenburg-Vorpommern, Saxony, Saxony-Anhalt and Thuringia. The law was to take effect on 14 October 1990.

On 31 August 1990 the Unification Treaty set an accession date of October 3 (modifying the State Creation Law to come into effect on that date). The Unification Treaty declared that (with few exceptions) at accession the laws of East Germany would be replaced overnight by those of West Germany. The Volkskammer approved the treaty on September 20 by a margin of 299-80—in effect, voting East Germany to dissolve itself.

On 3 October 1990 the five new states and East Berlin (which was unified with West Berlin), were unified with West Germany in 1990.

The post-1990 united Germany is not a successor state, but an enlarged continuation of the former West Germany. As such, the enlarged Federal Republic of Germany retained the West German seats in international organizations, while the memberships in the Warsaw Pact and other international organizations to which East Germany belonged simply ceased to exist because East Germany ceased to exist.

=== Holy Roman Empire ===
The dissolution of the Holy Roman Empire occurred de facto on 6 August 1806, when the last Holy Roman Emperor, Francis II of the House of Habsburg-Lorraine, abdicated his title and released all imperial states and officials from their oaths and obligations to the empire. Since the Middle Ages, the Holy Roman Empire had been recognised by Western Europeans as the legitimate continuation of the ancient Western Roman Empire due to its emperors having been proclaimed as Roman emperors by the papacy. Through this Roman legacy, the Holy Roman Emperors claimed to be universal monarchs whose jurisdiction extended beyond their empire's formal borders to all of Christian Europe and beyond. The decline of the Holy Roman Empire was a long and drawn-out process lasting centuries. The formation of the first modern sovereign territorial states in the 16th and 17th centuries, which brought with it the idea that jurisdiction corresponded to actual territory governed, threatened the universal nature of the Holy Roman Empire.

=== Monasteries ===
The dissolution of the Monasteries, was the set of administrative and legal processes between 1536 and 1541 by which Henry VIII disbanded monasteries, priories, convents and friaries, in England, Wales and Ireland, appropriated their income, disposed of their assets, and provided for their former personnel and functions.

=== Netherlands Antilles ===
The Netherlands Antilles was an autonomous Caribbean country within the Kingdom of the Netherlands. It was dissolved on 10 October 2010.

After dissolution, the "BES islands" of the Dutch Caribbean—Bonaire, Sint Eustatius, and Saba—became the Caribbean Netherlands, "special municipalities" of the Netherlands proper — a structure that only exists in the Caribbean. Meanwhile Curaçao and Sint Maarten became constituent countries within the Kingdom of the Netherlands, along the lines of Aruba, which separated from the Netherlands Antilles in 1986.

=== Ottoman Empire ===
The dissolution of the Ottoman Empire occurred between 1908 and 1922, and began with the Second Constitutional Era with the Young Turk Revolution. It restored the Ottoman constitution of 1876 and brought in multi-party politics with a two stage electoral system (electoral law) under the Ottoman parliament. The constitution offered hope by freeing the empire's citizens to modernize the state's institutions and dissolve inter-communal tensions.

The occupation of Istanbul along with the occupation of Izmir mobilised the Turkish National Movement which ultimately won the Turkish War of Independence. The formal abolition of the Ottoman Sultanate was performed by the Grand National Assembly of Turkey on 1 November 1922. The Sultan was declared persona non grata from the lands that the Ottoman Dynasty ruled since 1299.

=== Prussia ===
The Free State of Prussia was dissolved on 25 February 1947, by decree of the Allied Control Council.

=== Soviet Union ===
The dissolution of the Soviet Union occurred between 1988 and 1991, and was the process of internal disintegration within the USSR, which began with growing unrest in its various constituent republics developing into an incessant political and legislative conflict between the republics and the central government, and ended when the leaders of three primal republics (the Russian SFSR, the Ukrainian SSR and the Byelorussian SSR) declared it no longer existed, later accompanied by 11 more republics, resulting in President Mikhail Gorbachev having to resign and what was left of the Soviet parliament formally acknowledging what had already taken place.

The failure of the 1991 August Coup, when Soviet government and military elites tried to overthrow Gorbachev and stop the "parade of sovereignties", led to the government in Moscow losing most of its influence, and many republics proclaiming independence in the following days and months. The secession of the Baltic states, the first to declare their sovereignty and then their full independence, was recognized in September 1991. The Belovezha Accords were signed on December 8 by President Boris Yeltsin of Russia, President Leonid Kravchuk of Ukraine, and Chairman Stanislav Shushkevich of Belarus, recognising each other's independence and creating the Commonwealth of Independent States (CIS). The remaining republics, with the exception of Georgia, joined the Commonwealth of Independent States on December 21, signing the Alma-Ata Declaration

On December 25, President Mikhail Gorbachev resigned, declared his office extinct, and handed over its powers—including control of the nuclear launch codes—to Yeltsin. That evening at 7:32 p.m., the Soviet flag was lowered from the Kremlin for the last time and replaced with the Russian national flag. On the next day, the Declaration 142-Н of the Supreme Soviet's upper chamber, the Soviet of the Republics, recognised self-governing independence for the Soviet republics, formally dissolving the Union. Both the Revolutions of 1989 in the Eastern Bloc and the dissolution of the Soviet Union marked the end of the Cold War.

In the aftermath of the Cold War, several of the former Soviet republics have retained close links with Russia and formed multilateral organizations such as the CIS, the Eurasian Economic Community, the Union State, the Eurasian Customs Union, and the Eurasian Economic Union, for economic and military cooperation. On the other hand, the Baltic states and the former Eastern Bloc countries joined NATO and the European Union, while Georgia and Ukraine have distanced themselves from Russia and express interest in following the same path.

=== United Kingdom of Portugal, Brazil and the Algarves ===
The United Kingdom of Portugal, Brazil and the Algarves was the transatlantic metropolis that controlled the Portuguese colonial empire, with its overseas possessions in Africa and Asia.

Thus, from the point of view of Brazil, the elevation to the rank of a kingdom and the creation of the United Kingdom represented a change in status, from that of a colony to that of an equal member of a political union. In the wake of the Liberal Revolution of 1820 in Portugal, attempts to compromise the autonomy and even the unity of Brazil, led to the breakdown of the union.

=== United Kingdoms of Sweden and Norway ===
The dissolution of the union between Norway and Sweden between the kingdoms of Norway and Sweden under the House of Bernadotte, was set in motion by a resolution of the Norwegian Parliament (the Storting) on 7 June 1905. Following some months of tension and fear of war between the neighboring kingdoms (then in personal union) – and a Norwegian plebiscite held on 13 August which overwhelmingly backed dissolution – negotiations between the two governments led to Sweden's recognition of Norway as an independent constitutional monarchy on 26 October 1905. On that date, King Oscar II renounced his claim to the Norwegian throne, effectively dissolving the United Kingdoms of Sweden and Norway, and this event was swiftly followed, on 18 November, by the accession to the Norwegian throne of Prince Carl of Denmark, taking the name of Haakon VII.

=== Viceroyalty of the Río de la Plata ===
The dissolution of the Viceroyalty of the Río de la Plata was the independence and breaking up of the Spanish colony in South America. Most of the viceroyalty is now part of Argentina, and other regions belong to Bolivia, Brazil, Paraguay and Uruguay.

=== Yugoslavia ===
The dissolution of Yugoslavia occurred as a result of a series of political upheavals and conflicts during the early 1990s. After a period of political and economic crisis in the 1980s, constituent republics of the Socialist Federal Republic of Yugoslavia split apart, but the unresolved issues caused bitter inter-ethnic Yugoslav wars. The wars primarily affected Bosnia and Herzegovina, neighbouring parts of Croatia and, some years later, Kosovo.

After the Allied victory in World War II, Yugoslavia was set up as a federation of six republics, with borders drawn along ethnic and historical lines: Bosnia and Herzegovina, Croatia, Macedonia, Montenegro, Serbia, and Slovenia. In addition, two autonomous provinces were established within Serbia: Vojvodina and Kosovo. Each of the republics had its own branch of the League of Communists of Yugoslavia party and a ruling elite, and any tensions were solved on the federal level. The Yugoslav model of state organisation, as well as a market socialist "middle way" between planned and liberal economy, had been a relative success, and the country experienced a period of strong economic growth and relative political stability up to the 1980s, under dictatorial rule of Josip Broz Tito. After his death in 1980, the weakened system of federal government was left unable to cope with rising economic and political challenges.

In the 1980s, Albanians of Kosovo started to demand that their autonomous province be granted the status of a constituent republic, starting with the 1981 protests. Ethnic tensions between Albanians and Kosovo Serbs remained high over the whole decade, which resulted in the growth of Serb opposition to the high autonomy of provinces and ineffective system of consensus at the federal level across Yugoslavia, which were seen as an obstacle for Serb interests. In 1987, Slobodan Milošević came to power in Serbia, and through a series of populist moves acquired de facto control over Kosovo, Vojvodina, and Montenegro, garnering a high level of support among Serbs for his centralist policies. Milošević was met with opposition by party leaders of the western republics of Slovenia and Croatia, who also advocated greater democratisation of the country in line with the Revolutions of 1989 in Eastern Europe. The League of Communists of Yugoslavia dissolved in January 1990 along federal lines. Republican communist organisations became the separate socialist parties.

During 1990, the socialists (former communists) lost power to ethnic separatist parties in the first multi-party elections held across the country, except in Serbia and Montenegro, where Milošević and his allies won. Nationalist rhetoric on all sides became increasingly heated. Between June 1991 and April 1992, four republics declared independence (only Serbia and Montenegro remained federated), but the status of ethnic Serbs outside Serbia and Montenegro, and that of ethnic Croats outside Croatia, remained unsolved. After a string of inter-ethnic incidents, the Yugoslav Wars ensued, first in Croatia and then, most severely, in multi-ethnic Bosnia and Herzegovina. The wars left long-term economic and political damage in the region, still felt there decades later.

== Proposed dissolutions ==
=== Belgium ===
The dissolution of Belgium is a hypothetical situation which has been discussed by both Belgian and international media envisioning a split of the country along linguistic divisions, with each of the Flemish Community (Flanders) and the French-speaking Community (Wallonia) becoming independent states. Alternatively, it is hypothesized that Flanders could join the Netherlands (Greater Netherlands movement) and Wallonia could join France (rattachist movement).

Both communities currently have a large degree of autonomy within the Belgian federation.

Complicating questions of partition are the status in a partitioned Belgium of Brussels; currently an autonomous bilingual region of itself — and the minority German-speaking Community.

=== Iraq ===
Dissolution of Iraq has been proposed as a solution to the country's sectarian issues and wars. Those favouring dissolution claim Iraq is an artificially created state and as a remnant of the regional Ottoman rule and British colonial rule; the British authorities selected Sunni Arab elites from the region for appointments to government and ministry offices, furthering sectarian inequalities.

The sectarian divides are between the Ba'athist loyalists (including Saddamists and Iraqi-Arab nationalists) (mostly also Sunni's), the Shia majority (South and East Iraq) and Sunni minority (North and West Iraq) and the various ethnic minorities; with the Assyrian autonomy movement and independence ambitions of the Kurds in Iraq.

Sectarian issues between the Iraq's territorial disputes have long been a source of conflict. Between 1936 and 1975 there was the long standing dispute over Shatt al-Arab, ending in conflict. There was the Shia uprising in 1979. In 1980 Iran was invaded by neighbouring Ba'athist Iraq leading to an 8 year war partly to try and prevent Ayatollah Ruhollah Khomeini from exporting the 1979 Iranian Revolution movement to Shia-majority Iraq and threaten the Sunni-dominated Ba'athist leadership. The invasion of Kuwait sparkied the Gulf War in 1990, and the 2003 invasion sparked the Iraq War. The sectarian issue was particularly evident during the civil war between 2005 and 2009, as intercommunal violence between Iraqi Sunni and Shi'a factions became prevalent. In February 2006, the Sunni organization Al-Qaeda in Iraq bombed one of the holiest sites in Shi'a Islam—the al-Askari Mosque in Samarra. This set off a wave of Shi'a reprisals against Sunnis followed by Sunni counterattacks. The conflict escalated over the next several months until by 2007, the National Intelligence Estimate described the situation as having elements of a civil war. In the mid to late 2010s, despite the Islamic State of Iraq and the Levant having lost territorial control in the civil war, the insurgency continued.

Iraqi Kurdistan first gained autonomous status in a 1970 agreement with the Iraqi government, and its status was re-confirmed as the autonomous Kurdistan Region within the federal Iraqi republic in 2005. Further to the long-standing Iraqi–Kurdish conflict, there are numerous disputed territories in the region. With the historical precedent set by the Kingdom of Kurdistan, the Kurdistan Regional Government has also held two unrecognised independence referendums: in 2005 and 2017. There was also a Kirkuk status referendum. Matter of Kurdish independence are further complicated by conflict with Turkey, the previous Iraqi Kurdish Civil War, and the Syrian Civil War.

=== Kosovo ===
Kosovo, which unilaterally declared independence in 2008 from Serbia has been embroiled in a dispute over its status. Dissolution of Kosovo is a proposed solution in the context of partition along ethnic lines, separating Serb-dominated North Kosovo, and possibly some enclaves in the south, from the rest of the Albanian-dominated Kosovo and the idea of the unification of Albania and Kosovo. The latter idea has been brought into connection with the irredentist concept of Greater Albania.

=== Syria ===
With the outbreak of the Syrian Civil War, the territorial advance by the Islamic State of Iraq and the Levant, which has in turn led to renewed calls of various separatist claims due to issues with various sectarian divides, dissolution has been proposed as a solution. This has been especially true regarding the status of the Kurds in Syria who inhabit Syrian Kurdistan and Rojava However, so far federalisation of Syria seems a much more likely outcome with the establishment of the Autonomous Administration of North and East Syria. Matters of an independent Kurdistan are further complicated by the Rojava conflict, Kurdish-Islamist conflict and the conflict with neighbouring Turkey.

=== United Kingdom ===
With the impact of Brexit, and strengthening of support for Scottish independence, various scenarios have been mooted regarding the future of the current United Kingdom. These events in turn have strengthened other independence movements in the United Kingdom; the independence movement of Wales, Cornish independence and called into question the status of Northern Ireland; including not only unification with the Republic of Ireland, but also their own potential independence. A small London independence movement has been formed, whilst English independence and a proposed English parliament movements have existed for some time already. Scottish independence itself has also called into question the constitutional status of Orkney, Shetland and the Western Isles. Other issues include the status of crown Dependencies; Jersey, Guernsey (which includes the island of Guernsey and the autonomous Sark and Alderney), and the Isle of Man. The status of British Overseas Territories, especially Gibraltar, but also those which lie further afield (for example the Cayman Islands, Falkland Islands, Montserrat and Anguilla) is also linked, and in the context of the territorial evolution of the British Empire, linked to their independence as the final part of British decolonisation.

Therefore, a potential dissolution of the United Kingdom has been muted, with various potential nations and states emerging and changing their constitutional status. It is seen as a resolution of the various grievances and the balance of the countries of the United Kingdom, including the West Lothian question. Legal complexities relate to the complicated nature of British nationality law, and the status of the various Act of Union: 1535 and 1542 (England and Wales), 1652 (Scotland and England), 1707 (Scotland and England to form Great Britain), and 1800 (Great Britain and Ireland to form the United Kingdom).

=== United States ===
The dissolution of the United States is a political science theory on the possible disintegration of the United States of America.

== See also ==
- Dissolution (law)
- Dissolution of parliament
- Dissolution (disambiguation)
- State collapse
