= Call of God =

2022 film by Kim Ki-duk

- Directed by: Kim Ki-duk
- Written by: Kim Ki-duk
- Starring: Zhanel Sergazina; Abylai Maratov
- Cinematography: Kim Ki-duk
- Music by: Sven Grünberg
- Release dates: November 20, 2022 (Tallinn Black Nights Film Festival); December 9, 2022 (Estonia)
- Running time: 81 minutes
- Countries: Estonia, Lithuania, Kyrgyzstan, South Korea

Call of God (Estonian: Kõne taevast) is a 2022 drama film written and directed by Kim Ki-duk. The final film of Kim, it was completed posthumously by his collaborator Artur Veeber. It premiered out of competition at the 79th edition of the Venice Film Festival. The festival's decision to screen the film despite sexual assault allegations against Kim was criticized by organizations such as the Federation of Korean Movie Workers' Union and Korean Womenlink.

== Plot ==
In Kyrgyzstan, a young woman (Zhanel Sergazina) meets a writer (Abylai Maratov). When he asks her where a cafe is, a thief runs off with her bag. The writer chases him and gets it back. The girl reluctantly accepts his offer to have dinner, starting a strange love story with a twist.

The pair's first encounter is shown to be a dream. The girl wakes up in bed and receives a phone call from a man. He says she can fall asleep and see what happens next, with everything in her dreams to happen in the real world, or she can stop sleeping, in which case what happened only in her previous dream will occur.

== Cast ==
- Zhanel Sergazina as Zhanel
- Abylai Maratov as Daniel
- Seydulla Moldakhanov as the Voice of God
