= Arirang (2011 film) =

South Korean documentary film

- Festival poster
- Hangul: 아리랑
- RR: Arirang
- MR: Arirang
- Production company: Kim Ki-duk Film
- Release date: 13 May 2011 (Cannes Film Festival)
- Running time: 100 minutes
- Country: South Korea
- Language: Korean

Arirang (Korean: 아리랑) is a 2011 South Korean documentary film by Kim Ki-duk. The film addresses a personal crisis Kim went through, sparked by an incident during the filming of his previous film, Dream, where the lead actress nearly died by hanging, and by the departure of a couple of close colleagues, including the director Jang Hoon. The title comes from a Korean folk song with the same title. In a heavily line-broken text released about the film, Kim writes that "Through Arirang I understand human beings, thank the nature, and accept my life as it is now." Kim produced the film entirely on his own. It premiered in the Un Certain Regard section of the 2011 Cannes Film Festival, where it won the Prix un certain regard.

== Release ==
The film premiered on 13 May at the 2011 Cannes Film Festival where it was screened in Un Certain Regard. Kim only did one interview at the festival, where he said that he felt better than when he made the film, and that it had helped him cure himself. At one occasion during the interview, Kim suddenly started to sob and sang "Arirang".

=== Reception ===
After attending the festival screening in Cannes, Variety's Leslie Felperin wrote: "Further evidence, as if it were needed, that digital is both the liberation of low-budget filmmaking and the enabler of self-indulgence". Felperin went on to call Arirang "An experience that can be likened only to being stuck next to a drunk in a bar who keeps reminding you he used to be famous, all his friends are bastards and he now understands the meaning of life". In Screen Daily, Dan Fainaru called it "the ultimate 'film d'auteur'", and wrote: "Doing it justice in a short review is almost impossible, not because Kim Ki-duk is providing revolutionary insights into his line of work, but because he raises numerous issues that are too often ignored as irrelevant or pedantic by professionals who should know better." Peter Bradshaw wrote: "It is the most extravagantly self-indulgent piece of pure loopiness imaginable – but gripping as well. A piece of experimentalism at odds with convention."

The film won the Prize of Un Certain Regard, the top award for best film in the section. The win was shared with the German film Stopped on Track, directed by Andreas Dresen.

== Publications ==
MARTONOVA, (2012) A. To feel HAN (Arirang by Kim Ki-duk) // Kino, No.3, Sofia:p. 49-47, ISSN 0861-4393 [Да чувстваш ХАН („Ариран" на Ким Ки-док). – Original title in Bulgarian]
