= Made in China (2014 film) =

- Korean: 메이드 인 차이나
- Directed by: Dong-hoo Kim
- Written by: Kim Ki-duk
- Production company: Kim Ki-duk Film
- Distributed by: Albatros Film; Kim Ki-duk Film
- Release date: 2014
- Running time: 100 minutes
- Country: South Korea
- Language: Korean

Made in China (Korean: 메이드 인 차이나) is a 2014 South Korean drama film directed by Kim Dong-Hoo. It was written and produced by Kim Ki-duk. The film premiered at the Tokyo International Film Festival in October 2014 and later made available for rental or purchase on Amazon.com.
