= Han Yeo-reum =

South Korean actress (born 1983)

- Born: Seo Min-jeong; October 25, 1983 (age 41); South Korea
- Occupation: Actress

Korean name
- Hangul: 한여름
- RR: Han Yeoreum
- MR: Han Yŏrŭm

Han Yeo-reum (Korean: 한여름) is a South Korean actress.

== Filmography ==
=== Film ===
- Sex Volunteer: Open Secret 1st Story (2010)
- Crazy Waiting (2008)
- Fantastic Parasuicides (2007)
- The Bow (2005)
- Samaritan Girl (2004)

=== TV series ===
- KBS Drama Special – "Do You Know Taekwondo?" (KBS2, 2012)
- Bravo, My Love! (MBC / 2011–2012) - Chae Hee-Soo
- Glass Castle (SBS / 2008–2009) - Kang Hye-Young
- Sang Doo! Let's Go to School (KBS2 / 2003)
- Nonstop 2 (MBC / 2002)
