= Amen (2011 film) =

- Film poster
- Hangul: 아멘
- RR: Amen
- MR: Amen
- Directed by: Kim Ki-duk
- Written by: Kim Ki-duk
- Produced by: Kim Ki-duk
- Starring: Kim Ye-na
- Cinematography: Kim Ki-duk
- Edited by: Kim Ki-duk
- Production company: Kim Ki-duk Film
- Release date: 17 September 2011 (San Sebastián Film Festival)
- Running time: 72 minutes
- Country: South Korea
- Language: Korean

Amen is a 2011 South Korean drama film written and directed by Kim Ki-duk, starring Kim Ye-na. Shot in Europe, it follows a Korean girl on a mysterious journey. The film premiered in competition at the 2011 San Sebastián International Film Festival.

== Cast ==
- Kim Ye-na as the girl
- Kim Ki-duk as gas-masked rapist

== Reception ==
Fionnuala Halligan wrote in Screen Daily: "Amen is first and foremost a conceptual piece of work and viewers will either hop on or off Kim's train - small matters of logic or continuity won't matter to those who want to take the trip. ... Distinguishing the film is talented young Korean actress Kim Ye-na whose watchable, irregular, face draws you into Kim's obsessions."
