= Seo Ji-seok =

South Korean actor

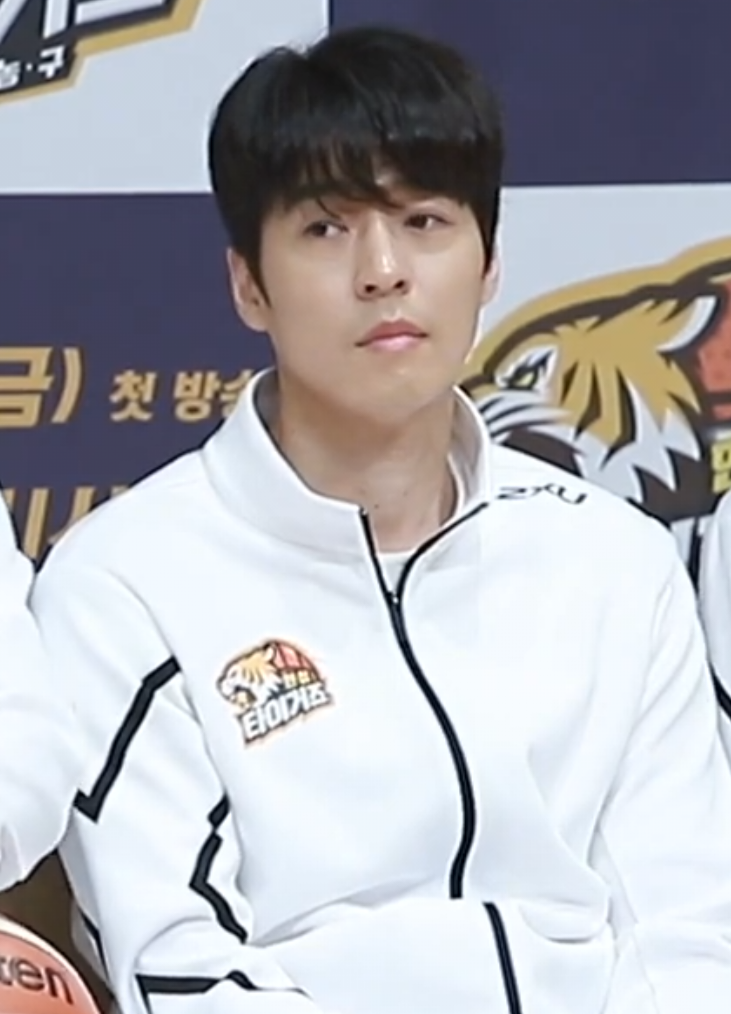
- Seo in 2020
- Born: Seo Jong-wook; 9 September 1981 (age 45); Seoul, South Korea
- Education: Seoul Institute of the Arts
- Occupation: Actor
- Years active: 2001–present
- Agent: Management Redwoods
- Height: 1.82 m (5 ft 11 1/2 in)

Korean name
- Hangul: 서종욱
- Hanja: 徐宗旭
- RR: Seo Jonguk
- MR: Sŏ Chonguk

Stage name
- Hangul: 서지석
- RR: Seo Jiseok
- MR: Sŏ Chisŏk
- Website: Seo Ji-seok official homepage

Seo Ji-seok (born Seo Jong-wook, 9 September 1981) is a South Korean actor. He is best known for playing in the long-running TV series, notably in the 167-episode KBS1 daily drama Hearts of Nineteen (Pure 19), which brought him to win Best New Actor at the 2006 KBS Drama Awards.

== Early life and education ==
Seo was an athlete specializing in 100 metres and 200 metres sprint in middle school. He won four gold medals in a variety of sports when he was 16 years old and was also chosen to be the member of the national team. However, in 1999, he was hit by a vehicle while he was crossing the street, and was hospitalized for 6 months. He was then scouted on the street, while working part-time, by a talent manager who liked his refined appearance, henceforth choosing acting as his career. Seo graduated from Seoul Institute of the Arts, majoring in Bachelor of Film and Television.

== Career ==
Seo has appeared in two films directed by renowned South Korean movie director Kim Ki-duk. In Kim's 2005 film The Bow, he played a college student involved in a mysterious and dangerous relationship between an old man and a 16-year-old girl.

Seo appeared for the second time in Kim's movie Time as a guest star, and participated in the film May I Cry? in 2006. That same year, Seo was cast as the smart and cold Park Yoon-hoo in the 167-episode daily drama Hearts of Nineteen, leading the series alongside Ku Hye-sun. For his performance in the series, he won Best New Actor award at the 2006 KBS Drama Awards.

In 2007, Seo reported for his mandatory military service and was assigned to the 12th Infantry Division located in Inje, Gangwon-do. He was discharged on May 3, 2009, and subsequently held a fan meeting on May 10, 2009. Seo returned to acting by playing in an independent film The Inside Story of Him and Her and appearing as a cameo in High Kick Through The Roof.

In 2010, Seo was cast as a lead role in the series OB & GY, followed by weekend drama Gloria opposite Bae Doona. He next joined a variety show Sunday Night for six months as one of the MCs.

In 2011, Seo starred in the 16-episode romantic-comedy drama Manny. He also starred in High Kick Through The Roof's spin-off; a 123-episode sitcom High Kick: Revenge of the Short Legged. In addition to acting, Seo also appeared in figure skater Kim Yuna's variety show Kim Yuna's Kiss & Cry.

In 2012, Seo participated in the 3-episode of MBC Music cable TV variety program Music and Lyrics Season 2 with composer Kim Wi Yong, actress Lee Chung-ah, and singer Heo Young-saeng to collaborate on OST "Gazing (바라본다)" for MBC's weekend drama The Sons. The following year, Seo played as a lead actor in the film Mango Tree, a cameo in the series Potato Star 2013QR3, and also starred in the 50-episode weekend drama A Little Love Never Hurts from 2013 to 2014.

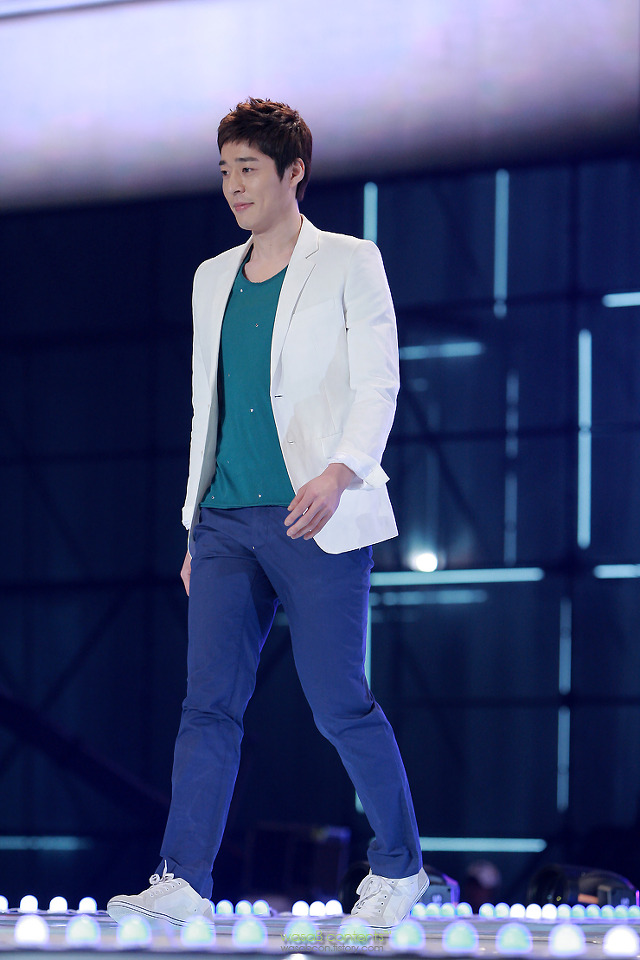
Seo in 2013

From 2013 to 2015, Seo appeared in two long-running variety programs; Cool Kiz on the Block, and Law of the Jungle which was shot in Costa Rica. He returned to daily dramas, playing in the 120-episode The Three Witches (Witch Castle) in 2015, followed by 100-episode Unknown Woman in 2017.

In July 2019, Seo replaced Kang Ji-hwan in a period drama Joseon Survival Period, starting from episode 11 to 16.

In october 2021 Seo has signed with Management Redwoods.

== Personal life ==
Seo married a florist in 2013. Singer IU and R&B group 4Men sang celebratory songs in their wedding.

== Filmography ==
=== Film ===
Year	English Title	Original title	Role	Director(s)	Notes	Ref.
2005	The Bow	활	The Student	Kim Ki-duk		
2006	May I Cry?	울어도 좋습니까?				
2006	Time	Time	Guy 1	Kim Ki-duk		
2013	The Inside Story about Him & Her	그 여자 그 남자의 속사정	Jung-soo			
2013	Mango Tree	연애의 기술, 망고트리	Tae-hoon			

=== Television series ===
Year	English title	Original title	Role	Notes	Ref.
2004	Ireland	아일랜드			
2006	Mr. Goodbye	미스터 굿바이			
2006-2007	Hearts of Nineteen	열아홉 순정	Park Yoon-hoo		
2009	High Kick Through the Roof	지붕 뚫고 하이킥	Seo Ji-seok	cameo in episode 18	
2010	Gloria	글로리아	Lee Kang-suk		
2010	OB & GY	산부인과	Wang Jae-suk		
2011	Manny	매니	Kim Min-han		
2011-2012	High Kick: Revenge of the Short Legged	하이킥! 짧은 다리의 역습	Yoon Ji-seok		
2013	Potato Star 2013QR3	감자별	Basketball teammate	cameo in episode 38	
2013-2014	A Little Love Never Hurts	사랑해서 남주나	Eun Ha-rim		
2015-2016	The Three Witches	마녀의 성	Shin Kang-hyun		
2017	Unknown Woman	이름 없는 여자	Kim Moo-yeol		
2019	Joseon Survival Period	조선생존기	Han Jung-rok	replaced Kang Ji-hwan from episode 11 to 16	
2021	Somehow Family	어쩌다 가족	Kim Ji-seok		
2021	The Penthouse: War in Life 3	펜트하우스 3		Cameo	

=== Music video appearance ===
Year	Song title	Artist	Note
2002	"Snow is Falling Down" (눈이 내리네)	Taemu	
2005	"I am without You" (그대없이 난)	Lee Ji-hye	directed by Kim Ki-duk
2010	"I Love You & Thank You" (고마워 그리고 사랑해)	Yu Hoon-min	directed by Park Ji-ho
2013	The Art of Seduction	Heo Young-saeng	
2013	"My Student Teacher" (교생쌤)	NC.A	

=== Variety shows ===
Year	English title	Original title	Notes	Ref.
2010	Sunday Night	일밤	Episode Enjoy Today	
2010	Cooking Olympic Gochujang	쿠킹 올림픽 고추장		
2011	Kim Yuna's Kiss & Cry	김연아의 키스 & 크라이		
2012	Music and Lyrics - Season 2	그여자 작사 그남자 작곡 시즌2	He composed "Gazing" (바라본다)	
2013	Miracle Korea	미라클 코리아		
2013-2015	Cool Kiz on the Block	우리동네 예체능	Basketball, Taekwondo, Soccer, Foot Volleyball, Cycling & Swimming Chapters	
2014-2015	Law of the Jungle	정글의 법칙 in 코스타리카	Episode Costarica	
2018	Running Man	아일랜드	Episode 401	
2020	Handsome Tigers	진짜 농구 핸섬타이거즈	Cast member	

== Theater ==
Year	English title	Korean title	Role	Ref.
2022–2023	Misery	미저리	Paul Sheldon	

== Awards and nominations ==
Year	Award	Category	Nominated work	Result	Ref.
2006	KBS Drama Awards	Best New Actor in a Serial Drama	Hearts of Nineteen	Won	
2012	The 46th Annual Taxpayer's Day	President Award	—N/a	Won	
2013	KBS Entertainment Awards	Best Teamwork	Cool Kiz on the Block	Won	
