= Dissolve (2019 film) =

South Korea film

- Film poster
- Korean: 딘
- Directed by: Kim Ki-duk
- Written by: Kim Ki-duk
- Starring: Dinara Zhumagaliyeva; Sanjar Madi; Aruzhan Moldagaliyeva
- Release date: September 19, 2019 (Almaty)
- Running time: 80 minutes
- Countries: South Korea; Kazakhstan
- Language: Russian

Dissolve (Korean: 딘, Russian: Растворяться) is a 2019 feature-length drama film by the South Korean art-house director Kim Ki-Duk. It was shot in Kazakhstan with local actors and premiered at the Cannes Film Market under the temporary title 3000.

It was screened at the Almaty Film Festival in Kazakhstan on 19 September 2019, where it was compared to Kim's earlier film Samaritan Girl.

This was Kim's final film to be released before his death the following year.

== Plot ==
In Almaty, a sheltered and chaste woman named Din sees her life intertwined with the experiences of a prostitute who looks like her.

== Cast ==
- Dinara Zhumagaliyeva as Din
- Sanjar Madi as Nurlan
