= Byun Jung-soo =

South Korean model and actress (born 1974)

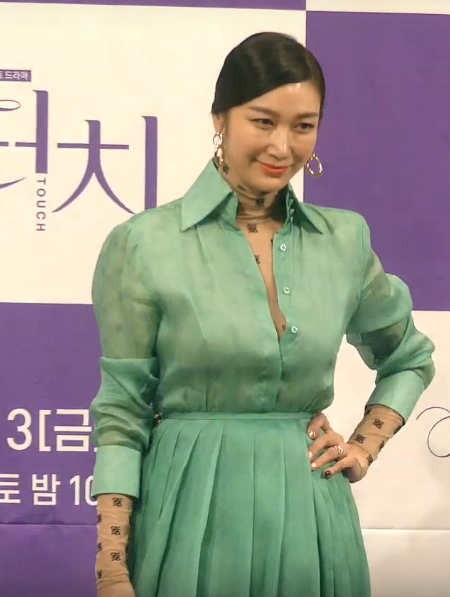
- Byun in 2020
- Born: April 15, 1974 (age 52); Seongbuk District, Seoul, South Korea
- Education: Kyungwon University - Textile Art
- Occupations: Model; actress
- Years active: 1995–present
- Agent: SP Entertainment
- Spouse: Andrew Liu (m. 1997)
- Children: Liu Chae-won; Liu Jung-won
- Family: Byun Jung-min (sister)

Korean name
- Hangul: 변정수
- RR: Byeon Jeongsu
- MR: Pyŏn Chŏngsu

Byun Jung-soo (Korean: 변정수; born April 15, 1974) is a South Korean model and actress. As a model in the 1990s, Byun walked the runways in Seoul, Paris and New York, notably for the brand Kenzo. She began acting in 2002, and starred in television dramas such as Women Next Door (2003), You're Not Alone (2004), Can Love Be Refilled? (2005), Last Scandal (2008) and Manny (2011). In 2005, Byun became the creative director for clothing label Ellahoya, when it launched its higher-end line for the Hyundai Home Shopping Network. Known for her chic sense of style, in 2008 she became the host of talk show Olive Show, which featured trends in fashion. Byun also created the make-up line Licht in 2009, and has written three books.

== Filmography ==
Year	Title	Role
2002	Man in Crisis	Yoon Na-mi
2002	Shoot for the Stars	Lee Mi-ryun
2003	The Bean Chaff of My Life	Bae Hyun-ah
2003	Women Next Door	Ae-kyung
2003	First Love	Hong Young-ja
2004	The Woman Who Wants to Marry	Jang Seung-ri
2004	You're Not Alone	Reporter Byun Jung-soo
2004	Wives on Strike	Kim Jung-kang
2005	Can Love Be Refilled?	Hong Jin-joo
2006	What's Up Fox	Fashion show attendee (cameo, episode 2)
2007	Bad Couple	Na Dol-soon
2008	Last Scandal	Lee Na-yoon
2009	Style	(cameo)
2010	Pasta	Kim Kang
2010	Marry Me, Please	Han Kyung-joo
2011	Manny	Janice
2011	Bravo, My Love!	Byun Joo-ri
2013	KBS Drama Special: "Their Perfect Day"	Lee Mi-bok
2013	The Queen's Classroom	Go Na-ri's mother
2013	Ruby Ring	Jung Cho-rim
2014	4 Legendary Witches	Ma Joo-ran
2015	Best Couple	Kang Min Kyung
2017	Band of Sisters	Go Pil Soon
2021	Melancholia	Yoo Hye-mi
2026	Undercover Miss Hong	Choi In-ja

=== Film ===
Year	Title	Role	Notes
2002	Marrying the Mafia	(cameo)	
2003	If You Were Me	Mom	segment: "The Man with an Affair"
2011	White: The Melody of the Curse	Agency representative	
2021	Brother	Mun	

=== Variety/radio show ===
Year	Title	Notes
1996	The Best Dining Table	
1996	Time Capsule	
1996	앗2시다	DJ
2008–2009	Olive Show	Host
2008–2009	May I Sleep Over Tonight?	Host
2012	Talk & City - Season 6	Host
2013	Moms Running in High Heels	Host
2013	Look at 美	Host

== Bibliography ==
Year	Title	Publisher
1997	Yes! I'm a Wife	Songrim
2003	Byun Jung-soo's 7 Open Interiors	Sigongsa
2005	Byun Jung-soo's Massive Childcare	Chosun Ilbo Living Media

== Awards and nominations ==
Year	Award	Category	Nominated work	Result
1995	Model Line	Best New Model of the Year	—N/a	Won
2002	MBC Drama Awards	Popularity Award, Actress	Man in Crisis	Won
2003	Model Line	Korea's Best Dressed	—N/a	Won
2004	MBC Drama Awards	Special Acting Award	The Woman Who Wants to Marry	Won
2004	SBS Drama Awards	Excellence Award, Actress in a Sitcom	You're Not Alone	Won
2006	Korean Conference on Volunteering	Prime Minister's Award	—N/a	Won
2007	Donation Culture Innovation Forum	Minister's Award from the Ministry of Government Administration and Home Affairs	—N/a	Won
2010	44th Taxpayer's Day	Exemplary Taxpayer Commendation	—N/a	Won
2010	3rd Korea Sharing Awards	National Assembly Standing Committee Chairperson's Award	—N/a	Won
2010	3rd Korea Sharing and Volunteer Activities Awards	Top Excellence Award in the Private Sector	—N/a	Won
