= OB & GY =

2010 South Korean medical drama

- Promotional poster
- Genre: Medical drama
- Starring: Jang Seo-hee; Go Joo-won; Seo Ji-seok; Jung Ho-bin; Song Joong-ki
- Country of origin: South Korea
- Original language: Korean
- No. of episodes: 16

Production
- Running time: 70 minutes
- Production company: JS Pictures

Original release
- Network: Seoul Broadcasting System
- Release: February 3 – March 25, 2010

OB & GY (Korean: 산부인과; Hanja: 産婦人科; RR: Sanbuingwa), also known as Obstetrics and Gynecology Doctors, is a 2010 South Korean medical drama television series. It aired on Seoul Broadcasting System on Wednesdays to Thursdays at 21:55 for 16 episodes beginning February 3, 2010. The drama depicts the difficult decisions and moving human stories that take place daily in the OB-GYN department, focusing in particular on Seo Hye Young, a talented and determined obstetrician who has just transferred from the prestigious Seoul base to the branch hospital. Her straightforward manner of handling her professional life is in contrast with her love life, which is marred by her relationship with a married man. This becomes even more entangled when she meets Lee Sang Shik, the chief of NICU, and her long-time friend Wang Jae Suk also shows his interest.

== Cast ==
=== Hospital Staff ===
- Jang Seo-hee as Seo Hye-young
- Go Joo-won as Lee Sang-shik
- Seo Ji-seok as Wang Jae-suk
- Lee Young-eun as Kim Young-mi
- Song Joong-ki as Ahn Kyung-woo
- Ahn Sun-young as Head Nurse Lee Sook-jung
- Yun Woon-kyung as Center Director
- Lee Ki-young as Assistant Chief Oh Jae-ho
- Lee Seung-hyung as Jung Kyung-joo
- Ji Yoo as Nurse Cha Young-ah
- Kim Ho-chang as Tae-joon

=== Others ===
- Jung Ho-bin as Yoon Seo-jin
- Yang Hee-kyung as Hye-young's mother
- Min Ji-young as Joo-young (Hye-young's sister)
- Choi Joon-yong as Sang-shik's brother
- Cha Hyun-jung as Jung Yoo-sun
- Lee Seul-bi as Im Seung-min
- Kim Hyun-ah as Min Young-joo
- Heo Joon-suk

=== Cameos ===
- Hyun Young as Lee Yoon-jin (ep1-2)
- Lee Eui-jung as Yeon-im (ep1-2)
- Park Jae-hoon as twins' dad (ep2, 5)
- Han Yeo-woon as Soo-jin (ep3)
- Ji Il-joo as Soo-jin's boyfriend (ep3)
- Hwang Hyo-eun as Soon-hwa (ep3)
- Kim Mi-ryeo as Moon-young (ep3)
- Wi Yang-ho as Moon-young's husband (ep3)
- Kang Ki-hwa as Joon-hee (ep4)
- Sung Ji-roo as Joon-suk (ep4-5)
- Kim Hye-ji as Sang-mi (ep5)
- Bang Joon-seo as Soo-bin (ep6-7)
- Park Bodre as Teacher Park Min-jung (ep8, 11)
- Hwang In-young as Jung Eun-Mi (ep9)
- Lee Il-hwa as Lee Jung-joo (ep9)
- Kim Jung-nan as Kim Min-sun (ep10-11)
- Kim Mi-yeon as Jae-suk's ex (ep11-12)
- Jin Ye-sol as Kang Soo-ah (ep12)
- Geum Dan-bi as Min Soo-young (ep12-13)
- Ban Min-jung
- Im Seung-dae
- Lee Yun-kyung
- Song Seung-yong
- Ji Seung-hyun
