= The Bow (film) =

- Theatrical poster
- Hangul: 활
- RR: Hwal
- MR: Hwal
- Directed by: Kim Ki-duk
- Written by: Kim Ki-duk
- Produced by: Kim Ki-duk
- Starring: Han Yeo-reum; Jeon Seong-hwang; Seo Ji-seok
- Production company: Kim Ki-duk Film
- Release date: 12 May 2005
- Running time: 90 minutes
- Country: South Korea
- Language: Korean
- Box office: US$2 million

The Bow (Korean title: Hwal) is a 2005 film written and directed by Kim Ki-duk. It was screened in the Un Certain Regard section at the 2005 Cannes Film Festival.

The film is primarily centered on a 60-year-old man and a 16-year-old girl living in near seclusion on a fishing boat. It is agreed that they will marry when the girl turns 17. Much like other movies by Kim Ki-duk, the film contains very little dialogue and is filled with symbols.

== Plot ==
The Bow is set entirely on a rotting 40-foot boat anchored off the coast of Korea. An old man (Jeon Seong-hwang) maintains it as a fishing platform for tourists with the help of a beautiful 16-year-old girl (Han Yeo-reum) who appears to be mute. Visitors to the boat chat about the rumors. He brought her out when she was just six years old. Her parents are looking for her. He plans to marry her on her 17th birthday. The stories sound farfetched, as does the idea that the old man is also a fortune teller, but they all turn out to be basically true. She is everything to him: a kidnap victim/daughter/girlfriend/fiancée. The old man fends off the fishermen, who make advances at the girl, by shooting arrows at them while the girl just smiles. He predicts fortune by shooting three arrows at a Bodhisattva image on the side of the boat as the girl swings dangerously in front of it. The girl whispers in his ear and he whispers in the person's ear his fortune. She's not a bad archer either and is more than capable of protecting herself. When he's not wielding the bow as a weapon, the old man converts it into a musical instrument and plays it like a violin.

The old man's arrangements start to come apart when the boat is visited by a fishing party that includes a sweet-natured student (Seo Ji-seok) who falls in love with the girl at first sight and is profoundly concerned about her situation. She, too, falls for him, and the old man starts to fear that his marriage day, carefully marked on his calendar, may never come to pass. The student comes to take her away as her parents are searching for her still, but the old man tries to prevent them from leaving by shooting arrows at him but she stands in front. The old man tries to commit suicide out of shame. She returns and marries him. They each liberate a chicken as part of the ceremony. They leave on the boat to consummate the marriage. The student releases the hen but hits the cock but later releases it too. The old man starts to play his bow and the girl falls asleep. He shoots an arrow in the sky and jumps into the ocean. The boat returns to the student. However, the girl acts as though someone is having sex with her and suddenly the arrow shot earlier strikes between her legs in the plank. She has an orgasm and bleeds. As they leave the old boat starts following them and after she waves sinks. Then this message comes onscreen as an end note:
"Strength and a beautiful sound like in the tautness of a bow. I want to live like this until the day I die."

== Cast ==
- Han Yeo-reum – The young girl
- Seo Ji-seok – The student
- Jeon Gook-hwan – The student's father
- Jeon Seong-hwan – The old man

== Reception ==
Review aggregator Rotten Tomatoes reports 86% approval for The Bow, with an average rating of 6.8/10.
