= Dissolution (law) =

Type of legal events which terminate a legal entity or agreement

Dissolution practices
- Type: Commercial law
- Duration: 1 to 8 month(s)

In law, dissolution is any of several legal events that terminate a legal entity or agreement such as a marriage, adoption, corporation, or union.

Dissolution is the last stage of liquidation, the process by which a company (or part of a company) is brought to an end, and the assets and property of the company are gone forever.

Dissolution of a partnership is the first of two stages in the termination of a partnership. "Winding up" is the second stage.

Dissolution may refer to the termination of a contract or other legal relationship. For example, in England and Wales, divorce is the end of a marriage; dissolution is the end of a civil partnership. ( A common misperception is that dissolution is only if the husband or wife does not agree: if the husband and wife agree then it is a dissolution).

Dissolution is also the term for the legal process by which an adoption is reversed. While this applies to the vast majority of adoptions which are terminated, they are more commonly referred to as disruptions, even though that term technically applies only to those that are not legally complete at the time of termination.

In international law, dissolution (Latin: dismembratio) is when a state has broken up into several entities, and no longer has power over those entities, as it used to have previously; this type of dissolution is identical to dissolution in the political sense. An example of this is the case of the former USSR dissolving into different republics.

== See also ==
- Dissolution (politics)
