= Lee Ah-hyun =

South Korean actress (born 1972)

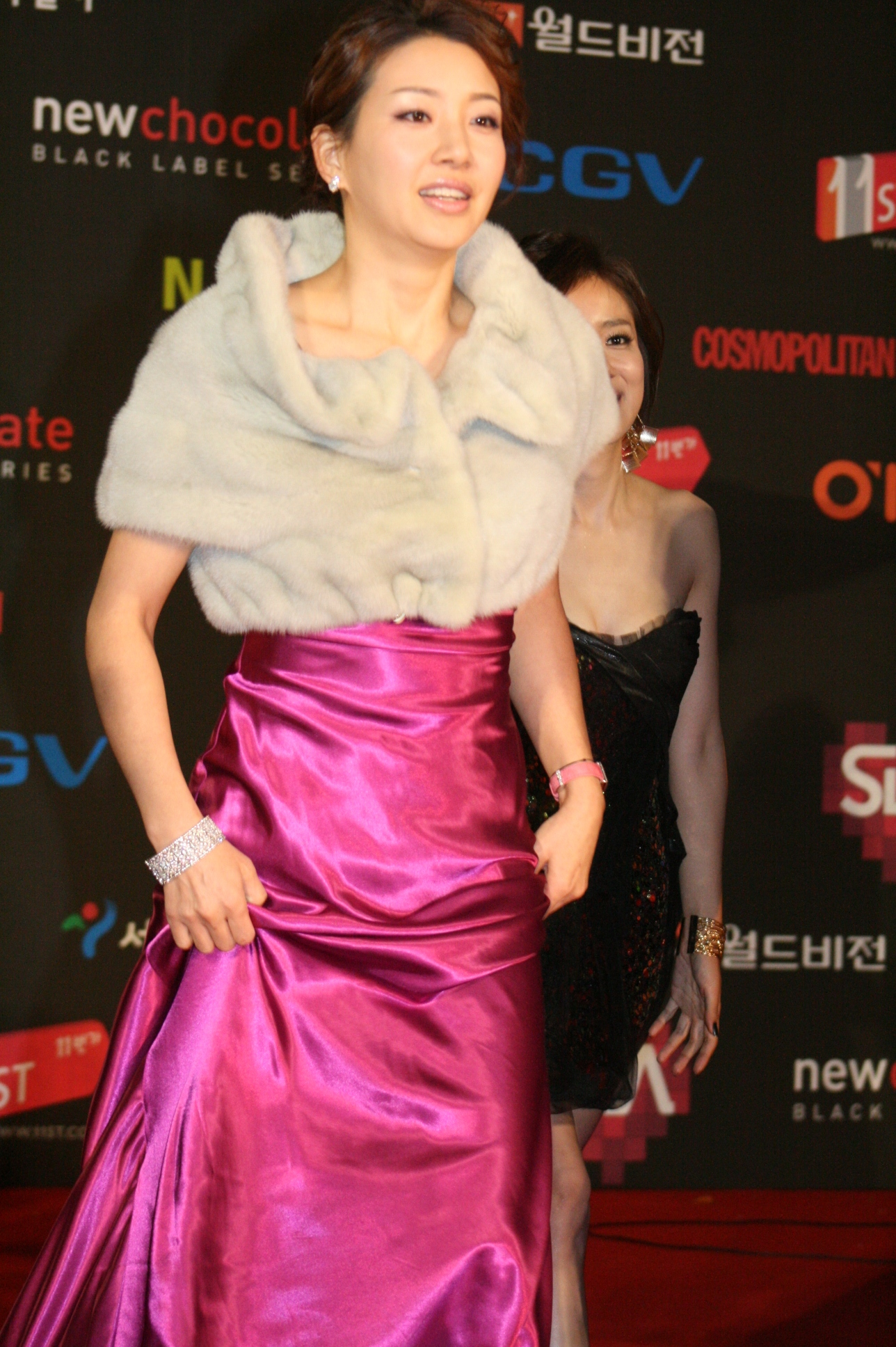
- Lee in 2009
- Born: April 13, 1972 (age 54); Seoul, South Korea
- Education: Yonsei University - Voice; Sejong University - Graduate School of Performing Arts
- Occupation: Actress
- Years active: 1994–present
- Agent: DoubleM Entertainment
- Spouse(s): Choi Jae-woo (m. 1997; div. 2000) Lee In-kwang (m. 2006; div. 2011)

Korean name
- Hangul: 이아현
- Hanja: 李雅賢
- RR: I Ahyeon
- MR: I Ahyŏn

Lee Ah-hyun (Korean: 이아현; born April 13, 1972) is a South Korean actress. She made her acting debut in the television drama Daughter of a Rich Family, for which she won Best New Actress at the 1994 KBS Drama Awards.

== Filmography ==
=== Television series ===
Year	Title	Role
1994	Daughter of a Rich Family	Kwon So-ryung
1995	LA Arirang	Eldest daughter Yu-mi
1995	Inside the Mysterious Mirror	Yeon-hee
1996	Me	
1996	White Dandelion	Seo Young-eun
1996	Drama Game: "The Man Who Went to the Success Club"	
1998	Tomorrow	English teacher
1999	Should My Tears Show	Kim Kyung-eun
2000	New Nonstop	(guest, episode 69)
2000	Say It with Your Eyes	
2000	Feels Good	
2000	Secret	Ha Mi-ra
2001	The Jewelry Box in My Heart	Yoon Hee-jung
2001	The Merchant	Cho-rae
2001	Her House	Dr. Jung Mi-so
2001	KBS TV Novel: "Stepmother"	Heo Sang-in
2001	Picnic	Joo-hye
2002	Age of Innocence	
2002	Let's Get Married	Moon Soo-kyung
2002	MBC Best Theater: "The Lost Umbrella"	Song Hye-joo
2003	The King's Woman	Lady Heo
2003	Near to You	Yeon-sook
2004	MBC Best Theater: "Dreaming of Romance"	Lee Soon-young
2005	Pingguari	Kim Se-young
2005	Drama City: "Spaghetti Date"	In-joo
2005	Only You	Han Yi-kyung
2005	My Lovely Sam Soon	Kim Yi-young
2005	Wild Flower	Lee Soon-jung
2006	Love and Hate	Kim Jung-hee
2008	Don't Cry My Love	Jo Mi-sun
2009	Dream	Jung Geum-ja
2009	Mrs. Town	Ahn Bo-bae
2010	Sunday Drama Theater: "It's Me, Grandma"	Aunt
2010	Marry Me, Mary!	Kam So-young
2010	Your Heaven	Mi-yeon
2011	Twinkle Twinkle	Hwang Tae-ran
2011	Servant, The Untold Story of Bang-ja	Wol-mae
2011	Color of Women	Oh Mi-rae
2012	Take Care of Us, Captain	Yang Mal-ja
2012	Love Again	Kim Mi-hee
2012	To the Beautiful You	Director Jang
2013	KBS TV Novel: "Samsaengi"	Go Mak-rye
2013	Princess Aurora	Lee Kang-sook
2013	The Queen's Classroom	Im Eun-young, Ha-na's mother
2013	The Greatest Thing in the World	Gu Ye-ri
2014	Jeong Do-jeon	Jeong Do-jeon's wife, Lady Choi
2014	Golden Cross	Kim Se-ryung
2014	Naeil's Cantabile	Yang Sun-young
2014	KBS Drama Special: "The Final Puzzle"	Jae-kyung
2016	Cinderella with Four Knights	Seo-woo's mother
2017	Love Returns	Dong Mi-ae
2018	Misty	Lee Yun-jeong
2018	Still 17	Gong Hyun-jung
2018	Top Star U-back	Ah Seo-ra
2020	Brilliant Heritage	Yoon Min-Joo
2022–2023	Bean Pods in My Eyes	Seo Hwa-kyung
2024	The Two Sisters	Min Ja-young (cameo)
2025	Catch Your Luck	Lee Mi-Ja

=== Film ===
Year	Title	Role
2005	The Windmill Palm Grove	Choi Sung-joo
2006	Over the Border	Kim Sun-ae
2013	Total Messed Family	Go Gwi-soon
2014	Mourning Grave	Oh Mi-hee

=== Variety show ===
Year	Title	Notes
1994	세계로 싱싱싱	
1995	Hi, English	Host
1995	Culture Special	Host
1995	Game Heaven	Host
1995	Oh! Happy Day	Host
2010	Mom, Crazy About English! Season 1	Host
2011	Kim Yu-na's Kiss & Cry	Contestant
2011	Mom, Crazy About English! Season 2	Host
