= Kim Yuna's Kiss & Cry =

- Genre: Reality competition
- Starring: Yuna Kim; Shin Dong-yup; IU; Jin Ji-hee; Kim Byung-man; Krystal; Lee Ah-hyun; Lee Kyou-hyuk; Park Joon-geum; Seo Ji-seok; Son Dam-bi; U-Know Yun-ho
- Country of origin: South Korea
- Original language: Korean
- No. of episodes: 14

Original release
- Network: Seoul Broadcasting System
- Release: May 22 – August 21, 2011

Kim Yuna's Kiss & Cry (Korean: 김연아의 키스 & 크라이) was a South Korean figure skating/ice dancing competition/reality show. It aired from May 22 to August 21, 2011 as part of the Good Sunday line-up on SBS. While the professional skater can perform jumps within a program, the lifting restrictions (no lifts above the man's waist) meant this is mostly in line with ice dancing regulations.

== Cast ==
=== Hosts ===
- Yuna Kim
- Shin Dong-yup

=== Judges ===
- Yuna Kim
- Go Sunghee
- David Wilson
- Kim Jang-hoon
- Park Haebi

=== Skaters ===
No.	Star skaters	Professional skaters	Remarks
1	Krystal Jung (Singer - girl group f(x) and actress)	Lee Dong-whun (age:25)	Winner of K & C
2	Kim Byung-man (Comedian)	Lee Soo-kyung (age:29)	2nd placing of K & C
3	Lee Kyou-hyuk (Long track speed skater)	Choi Sun-young (age:26)	3rd placing of K & C
4	Son Dam-bi (Singer and actress)	Cha Oreum (age:21)	4th placing of K & C
5	Park Joon-geum (Actress)	Kim Doh-wan (age:26)	eliminated @ Ep 12
6	U-Know Yun-ho (Singer - pop duo TVXQ and actor)	Claudia Jin-joo Müller Choi (age:15)	left competition after Ep 11
7	Lee Ah-hyun (Actress)	Kim Hyun-chul (age:36)	eliminated @ Ep 11
8	Jin Ji-hee (Actress)	Cha Jun-hwan (age:11)	eliminated @ Ep 10
9	IU (Singer and actress)	Choi In-hwa (age:27)	eliminated @ Ep 8
10	Seo Ji-seok (Actor)	Yoo Sun-hye (age:28)	eliminated @ Ep 8
