= Dissolution (Olivia Block album) =

Studio album by Olivia Block
- Released: November 11, 2016
- Genres: Electronic music Experimental music Musique concrète Tape music
- Label: Glistening Examples GLEX1603

Dissolution is a 2016 LP by American musician and sound artist Olivia Block. It was released on 11 November 2016 by independent record label Glistening Examples on LP record.

== Background ==
Dissolution is composed of found sounds, instruments, microcassettes, and shortwave radio signals. The press release described it as "a reflection upon human 'webs of significance,' and an investigation into the ways that electronic communications technologies, both past and present, facilitate, complicate and transmute the formation of these webs."

== Track listing ==
=== LP release ===
No.	Title	Length
1.	"Dissolution"	17:06
2.	"Dissolution"	14:14

== Performances ==
On September 14, 2013, Block performed her composition Dissolution alongside Pauline Oliveros at the ISSUE Project Room in Brooklyn, New York. On October 26, 2016, Block performed in Ponce de Leon Hall Rotunda at Flagler College in St. Augustine, Florida. On February 1, 2017, Block played a multimedia performance at Arthur Ross Gallery on University of Pennsylvania campus in Philadelphia, Pennsylvania.

== Personnel ==
Production

- Shaun Flynn – clarinet
- Lesley Swanson – flute
- Jason Lescalleet – mastered by

== Reception ==
Professional ratings
Review scores
Source	Rating
Exclaim!	7/10 stars

In September 2013, The New York Times's Steve Smith reviewed her performance at the ISSUE Project Room in Brooklyn, New York involving contact microphones, microcassette recorders, and walkie-talkies; as "graceful, deliberate physicality of her gestures enhanced the ebb and flow of her aural assemblage, endowing what might have sounded abstract and cerebral with palpable sensations of volition and emotional involvement."

In October 2016, Tiny Mix Tapes's David Nadelle recommended preordering the LP. In November 2016, Exclaim!'s Nilan Perera said "While ostensibly ambient in nature, in terms of the general feel of the sound/music flows, one shouldn't make the mistake of listening and not expecting narrative — there is a linear and present one in each piece on Dissolution." Fluid Radio's Nathan Thomas reviewed the LP favorably stating "Trying to make sense of "Dissolution" is like trying to piece together an image of a contemporary civilisation from its already-ruined traces; it seems like all these broken shards of communication should come together to form a coherent picture, but consistently, tellingly, they don't."

In January 2017, musician Lawrence English listed Dissolution on his playlist for FACT called "Everything Turns Out Golden." In March 2017, The Quietus's Russell Cuzner praised its composition as "less a 'movie-for-the-ears' and more a 'music-for-the-mind'."
