= Kim Ki-duk =

South Korean film director (1960–2020)

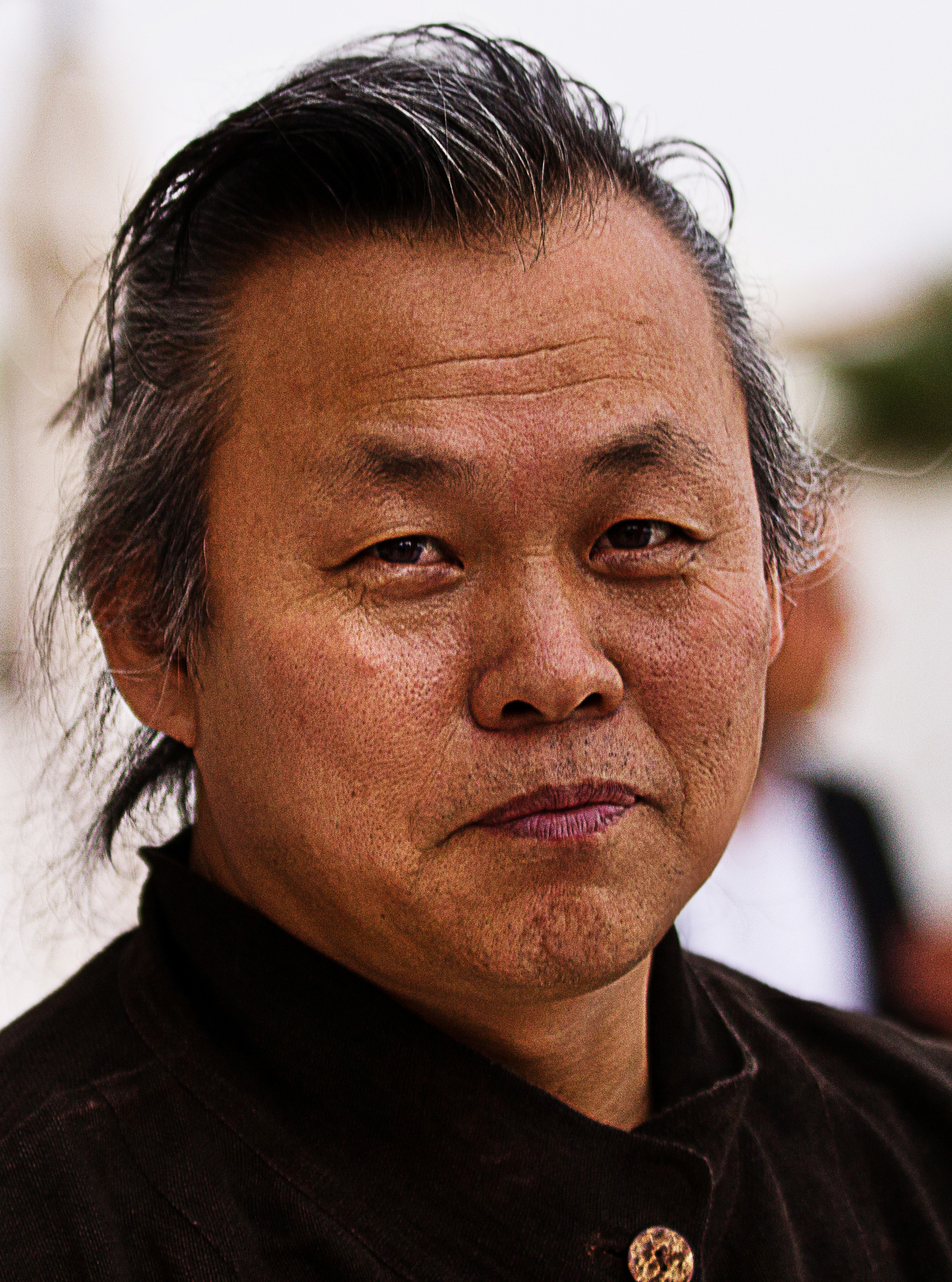
- Kim at the Venice International Film Festival in 2012
- Born: 20 December 1960; Ponghwa, South Korea
- Died: 11 December 2020 (aged 59); Riga, Latvia
- Occupations: Film director; screenwriter
- Years active: 1993–2020

Korean name
- Hangul: 김기덕
- Hanja: 金基德
- RR: Gim Gideok
- MR: Kim Kidŏk

Kim Ki-duk (Korean: 김기덕 [kim ɡidʌk̚]; 20 December 1960 – 11 December 2020) was a South Korean filmmaker, noted for his idiosyncratic art-house cinematic works. His films have received many distinctions in the festival circuit, rendering him one of the most important contemporary Asian film directors.

His major festival awards include the Golden Lion at 69th Venice International Film Festival for Pietà (2012), a Silver Lion for Best Director at 61st Venice International Film Festival for 3-Iron (2004), a Silver Bear for Best Director at 54th Berlin International Film Festival for Samaritan Girl (2004), and the Un Certain Regard prize at 2011 Cannes Film Festival for Arirang (2011). His most widely known feature is Spring, Summer, Fall, Winter... and Spring (2003), included in film critic Roger Ebert's Great Movies. Two of his films served as official submissions for the Academy Award for Best International Feature Film as South Korean entries. He gave scripts to several of his former assistant directors including Juhn Jai-hong (Beautiful and Poongsan) and Jang Hoon (Rough Cut).

== Early life and education ==
Kim was born on 20 December 1960 in Ponghwa, North Kyŏngsang. In 1990, he went to Paris to study fine arts, but instead he spent two years working there on the streets as a portrait painter. He served for five years in the South Korean marine corps, becoming a non-commissioned officer.

== Career ==
After returning to South Korea, Kim began his career as a screenwriter and won first prize in a screenplay contest held by the Korean Film Council in 1995. In the following year, Kim made his debut as a director with a low budget movie titled Crocodile (1996). The film received sensational reviews from movie critics in South Korea. Kim said that his international breakthrough occurred with The Isle at the Toronto International Film Festival. His 2000 film Real Fiction was entered into the 23rd Moscow International Film Festival.

In 2003, Kim released Spring, Summer, Fall, Winter... And Spring. The film was praised by numerous critics, including critic Peter Bradshaw, who considered the film to be his masterpiece and one of the great works of modern Korean cinema. "A potent and enigmatic parable which manages to be both serene and gripping at the same time [...] It is that rarest of things - a genuinely spiritual film." The film work is included in critic Roger Ebert's Great Movies.

In 2004, he received Best Director awards at two different film festivals, for two different films. At the Berlin International Film Festival, he was awarded for Samaritan Girl (2004), and at the Venice Film Festival he won for 3-Iron (also 2004). In 2011, his documentary film Arirang received an award for best film in the Un Certain Regard category from the Cannes Film Festival. In 2012, his film Pietà received the Golden Lion award at the Venice Film Festival.

== Personal life ==
=== Assault allegations ===
In August 2017, an actress referred to as "Actress "A" by prosecutors filed a complaint against Kim through Seoul Central District Prosecutor's Office. In the complaint the actress accused Kim of slapping her face and forcing her to do an unscripted sex scene on the set of his film Moebius. In December 2017, the Seoul Central District Prosecutor's Office fined Kim Ki-duk for $4,450 (KRW 5 million) for physical assault but didn't charge him otherwise citing lack of physical evidence.

On 6 March 2018, the South Korean TV channel MBC's investigative report series PD Notebook aired an episode titled "Movie director Kim Ki-duk, Master's Naked Face" with more accusations from Actress A and two others (Actress B and Actress C, as they are called in the episode). The actresses accused Kim and his frequent collaborator actor Cho Jae-hyun of verbal and physical sexual harassment and rape. In response, Kim filed false accusation and defamation suits against the accusers and PD Notebook.

After that, on 7 August 2018, MBC aired a second episode of the PD Notebook series focused on Kim, titled "Master's Naked Face. Aftermath", with more accusations from other actresses and staff members against Kim and Cho. In that episode, journalists interviewed a Seoul Metropolitan Police Agency's Special Investigation Unit on Sexual Violence official about the cases. The official explained that the police approached the survivors and established the facts behind accusations but could not indict actor Cho and director Kim because of the expired statute of limitations.

In January 2019, Seoul Central District Prosecutor's Office decided to drop the criminal lawsuits filed by Kim against actresses and PD Notebook because "there was neither proof that actress' initial accusation was false, nor was there evidence that the news show had been programmed with the purpose of defamation".

In March 2019, Kim filed another lawsuit in civil court against Actress A and PD Notebook seeking $885,740 (KRW 1 billion) in damages. The lawsuit was ruled by court in the defendants' favor on 28 October 2020. The court also ordered Kim to pay legal fees for the defendants.

=== Animal cruelty allegations ===
The British Board of Film Classification delayed the release of Kim's The Isle (2000) in the United Kingdom because of instances of animal cruelty in the film. Concerning scenes in which a frog is skinned after being beaten to death and fish are mutilated, the director stated, "We cooked all the fish we used in the film and ate them, expressing our appreciation. I've done a lot of cruelty on animals in my films. And I will have a guilty conscience for the rest of my life."

To a U.S. interviewer who suggested that scenes such as these are "very disturbing and [seem] to place an obstacle to the films [sic] reception, or... distribution, to other countries", Kim said, "Yes, I did worry about that fact. But the way I see it, the food that we eat today is no different. In America you eat beef, pork, and kill all these animals. And the people who eat these animals are not concerned with their slaughter. Animals are part of this cycle of consumption. It looks more cruel onscreen, but I don't see the difference. And yes, there's a cultural difference, and maybe Americans will have a problem with it - but if they can just be more sensitive to what is acceptable in different countries I'd hope they wouldn't have too many issues with what's shown on-screen."

== Death ==
On 11 December 2020, Kim died from complications caused by COVID-19 during the COVID-19 pandemic in Latvia at the age of 59, nine days before his 60th birthday.

== Filmography ==
Year	English title	Director	Producer	Writer	Editor	Notes/Ref.
1996	Crocodile	Yes		Yes		
1997	Wild Animals	Yes		Yes		
1998	Birdcage Inn	Yes		Yes		
2000	The Isle	Yes		Yes		
2000	Real Fiction	Yes		Yes		
2001	Address Unknown	Yes		Yes		
2001	Bad Guy	Yes		Yes		
2002	The Coast Guard	Yes		Yes		
2003	Spring, Summer, Fall, Winter... and Spring	Yes		Yes	Yes	"He also acts a major role (as the Adult Monk)"
2004	Samaritan Girl	Yes	Yes	Yes	Yes	
2004	3-Iron	Yes	Yes	Yes	Yes	
2005	The Bow	Yes	Yes	Yes	Yes	
2006	Time	Yes	Yes	Yes	Yes	
2007	Breath	Yes		Yes		
2008	Dream	Yes	Yes	Yes	Yes	
2008	Beautiful		Yes	Yes		
2008	Rough Cut		Yes	Yes		
2010	Secret Reunion			Yes		Uncredited
2011	Arirang	Yes	Yes	Yes	Yes	Dramatic documentary about himself
2011	Amen	Yes	Yes	Yes	Yes	Appears as "Masked Man"
2011	Poongsan		Yes	Yes		
2012	Pietà	Yes	Yes	Yes	Yes	
2013	Moebius	Yes	Yes	Yes	Yes	
2013	Rough Play		Yes	Yes		
2013	Red Family		Yes	Yes	Yes	
2014	One on One	Yes	Yes	Yes	Yes	
2014	Godsend		Yes	Yes		
2015	Stop	Yes	Yes	Yes	Yes	
2015	Made in China		Yes	Yes		
2016	The Net	Yes		Yes		
2017	Excavator		Yes	Yes		
2018	Human, Space, Time and Human	Yes		Yes	Yes	
2019	Dissolve	Yes		Yes	Yes	
2022	Call of God	Yes		Yes		Released after his death

== International awards ==
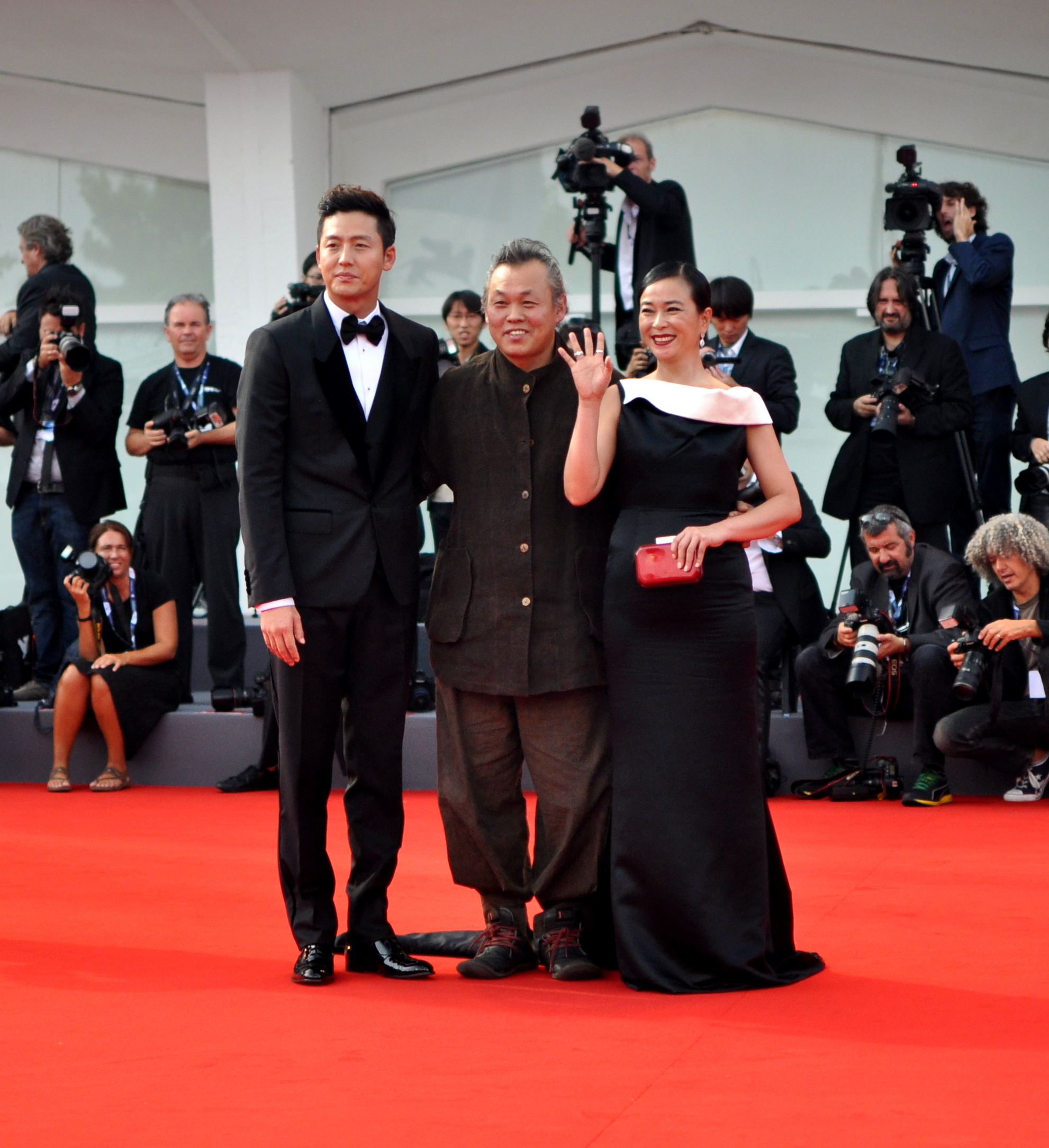
Lee Jung-jin, Kim and Jo Min-su in the 2012 Venice Film Festival

Year	Award	Category	Nominated work	Result	Ref.
2004	54th Berlin International Film Festival	Silver Bear (Best Director)	Samaritan Girl	Won	
2004	61st Venice Film Festival	Silver Lion (Best Director)	3-Iron	Won	
2011	Cannes Film Festival	Un Certain Regard Prize	Arirang	Won	
2012	Küstendorf Film and Music Festival	"Award for Future Movies"	Pietà	Won	
2012	69th Venice Film Festival	Golden Lion	Pietà	Won	
2014	71st Venice Film Festival	The Venice Days Best Film Award	One on One	Won	
