= Yūya Uchida (voice actor) =

Japanese voice actor (born 1965)

- 内田 夕夜
- Born: Hidekazu Uchida; December 3, 1965 (age 60); Saitama Prefecture, Japan
- Occupations: Actor; voice actor
- Years active: 1983–present
- Agent: Haiyuza Theatre Company
- Height: 173 cm (5 ft 8 in)

Hidekazu Uchida (内田 秀和, Uchida Hidekazu), known professionally as Yūya Uchida (内田 夕夜, Uchida Yūya; born December 3, 1965), is a Japanese actor and voice actor who has been managed by the Tokyo Actor's Consumer's Cooperative Society since 2021. He is a former member of the Haiyuza Theatre Company. He is best known for voicing Sam Winchester in Supernatural and its anime adaptation, Franken Stein in Soul Eater, Rinji and Tenji in Naruto: Shippuden, and Agnus in Devil May Cry 4. He has also performed dubbing roles for James McAvoy for X-Men film series, Cillian Murphy, Joseph Gordon-Levitt, Matt Damon, Ryan Gosling, Feng Shaofeng, Daniel Brühl, Ha Jung-woo, Shin Ha-kyun, Ji Sung, and many more.

== Filmography ==
=== Anime television series ===
- Eyeshield 21 (2006) (Shien Mushanokoji aka: "The Kid")
- Ghost in the Shell: Stand Alone Complex - Solid State Society (2006) (Tateaki Koshiki)
- Soul Eater (2008) (Franken Stein)
- La Corda d'Oro ~secondo passo~ (2009) (Akihiko Kira)
- Naruto: Shippuden (2009) (Rinji)
- Pandora Hearts (2009) (Rufus Barma)
- Spice and Wolf II (2009) (Rigoro)
- Supernatural: The Anime Series (2011) (Sam Winchester)
- Zetman (2012) (Black Suit A)
- Fairy Tail (2012) (Samuel, Kama)
- Aikatsu! (2014) (Camino Serio)
- Captain Earth (2014) (Masaki Kube)
- La Corda d'Oro Blue Sky (2014) (Daichi Sakaki, Akihiko Kira)
- Log Horizon (2014) (Zeldys)
- Psycho-Pass 2 (2014) (Kōichi Kuwashima)
- The Seven Deadly Sins (2014) (Hendrickson)
- Soul Eater Not! (2014) (Franken Stein)
- Tokyo Ghoul (2014) (Arata Kirishima)
- Tokyo Ghoul √A (2015) (Arata Kirishima)
- Blood Blockade Battlefront (2015) (Daniel Law)
- Utawarerumono: The False Faces (2015) (Mikazuchi)
- Maho Girls PreCure! (2016) (Headmaster)
- One Piece (2017) (Charlotte Perospero)
- Kokkoku: Moment by Moment (2018) (Shiomi)
- The Seven Deadly Sins: Revival of The Commandments (2018) (Hendrikson)
- No Guns Life (2019) (Cronen von Wolf)
- Bungo Stray Dogs 3 (2019) (Arthur Rimbaud)
- Kingdom Season 3 (2020) (Shun Shin Kun)
- The God of High School (2020) (Baek Seung-Cheol)
- Wonder Egg Priority (2021) (Acca)
- 86 (2021) (Ernst Zimmerman)
- Utawarerumono: Mask of Truth (2022) (Mikazuchi)
- Chainsaw Man (2022) (Violence Fiend)
- Mysterious Disappearances (2024) (Jikū no Ossan)
- My Happy Marriage Season 2 (2025) (Naoshi Usui)
- Orb: On the Movements of the Earth (2025) (Frei)
- Private Tutor to the Duke's Daughter (2025) (Professor)
- Daemons of the Shadow Realm (2026) (Mine)
- The Ghost in the Shell (2026) (Paz)
- Liar Game (2026) (Sho Kikuchi)

=== Original net animation (ONA) ===
- Terminator Zero (2024) (Malcom Lee)

=== Anime films ===
- Mushiking: The Road to the Greatest Champion (2005) (Dr. Nebu)
- Pretty Cure Dream Stars! (2017) (Headmaster)
- Chainsaw Man – The Movie: Reze Arc (2025) (Violence Fiend)

=== Video games ===
- Boku no Natsuyasumi 2 (2002) (Yasuda)
- Bokura no Kazoku (2005) (Jiji)
- Kiniro no Corda series (2007–present) (Kira Akihiko, Sakaki Daichi)
- Devil May Cry 4 (2008) (Agnus)
- Mobile Suit Gundam Battlefield Record U.C. 0081 (2009) (Erik Blanke)
- .hack//Link (2010) (Geist)
- Kamigami no Asobi (2013) (Akira Totsuka)
- Utawarerumono: Mask of Deception (2015) (Mikazuchi)
- Utawarerumono: Mask of Truth (2016) (Mikazuchi)
- Detroit: Become Human (2018, Japanese dub) (Markus)
- Nioh 2 (2020) (Takenaka Hanbei)
- One Piece: Pirate Warriors 4 (2020) (Charlotte Perospero)
- Monochrome Mobius: Rights and Wrongs Forgotten (2022) (Mikazuchi)
- Final Fantasy XVI (2023, Japanese dub) (Clive Rosfield; adult)
- Dissidia Duellum Final Fantasy (2026) (Clive Rosfield)
- The Adventures of Elliot: The Millennium Tales (2026) (Ikarus)
- Final Fantasy Resonance (2026) (Clive Rosfield)

=== Dubbing ===
==== Live-action ====
- Ryan Gosling
  - The Notebook (Noah Calhoun)
  - Lars and the Real Girl (Lars Lindstrom)
  - Drive (The Driver)
  - The Ides of March (Stephen Meyers)
  - Only God Forgives (Julian Thompson)
  - The Place Beyond the Pines (Julian)
  - The Nice Guys (Holland March)
  - La La Land (Sebastian Wilder)
  - Song to Song (BV)
  - First Man (Neil Armstrong)
  - The Gray Man (Courtland "Court" Gentry)
  - The Fall Guy (Colt Seavers)
  - Project Hail Mary (Dr. Ryland Grace)
- James McAvoy
  - Becoming Jane (Thomas "Tom" Lefroy)
  - Wanted (2019 BS Japan edition) (Wesley Gibson)
  - X-Men: First Class (Charles Xavier / Professor X)
  - X-Men: Days of Future Past (Charles Xavier / Professor X)
  - Victor Frankenstein (Doctor Victor Frankenstein)
  - X-Men: Apocalypse (Charles Xavier / Professor X)
  - Split (Kevin Wendell Crumb / The Horde)
  - Atomic Blonde (David Percival)
  - Glass (Kevin Wendell Crumb / The Horde)
  - Dark Phoenix (Charles Xavier / Professor X)
  - The Bubble (James McAvoy)
  - Speak No Evil (Paddy)
- Ha Jung-woo
  - The Chaser (Je Yeong-min)
  - The Yellow Sea (Gu-nam)
  - Assassination (Hawaii Pistol)
  - Tunnel (Lee Jung-soo)
  - 1987: When the Day Comes (Choi Hwan)
  - Along with the Gods: The Two Worlds (Gang-rim)
  - Along with the Gods: The Last 49 Days (Gang-rim)
  - Take Point (Ahab)
  - Ashfall (Captain Jo In-chang)
  - The Closet (Sang-won)
- Daniel Brühl
  - Good Bye, Lenin! (Alexander "Alex" Kerner)
  - Ladies in Lavender (Andrea Marowski)
  - Intruders (Father Antonio)
  - Burnt (Tony Balerdi)
  - Captain America: Civil War (Helmut Zemo)
  - The Alienist (Dr. Laszlo Kreizler)
  - The Cloverfield Paradox (Ernst Schmidt)
  - The Falcon and the Winter Soldier (Helmut Zemo)
  - The King's Man (Erik Jan Hanussen)
  - All Quiet on the Western Front (Matthias Erzberger)
- Cillian Murphy
  - Batman Begins (2008 Fuji TV edition) (Dr. Jonathan Crane / Scarecrow)
  - Breakfast on Pluto (Patrick/Patricia "Kitten" Braden)
  - The Wind That Shakes the Barley (Damien O'Donovan)
  - In Time (Timekeeper Raymond "Ray" Leon)
  - Peaky Blinders (Tommy Shelby)
  - Free Fire (Chris)
  - Anthropoid (Jozef Gabčík)
  - Dunkirk (Shivering Soldier)
  - A Quiet Place Part II (Emmett)
  - Oppenheimer (J. Robert Oppenheimer)
- Feng Shaofeng
  - Painted Skin: The Resurrection (Pang Lang)
  - Tai Chi 0 (Chen Zai Yang)
  - Tai Chi Hero (Chen Zai Yang)
  - Prince of Lan Ling (Gao Changgong)
  - Young Detective Dee: Rise of the Sea Dragon (Yuchi)
  - The Bodyguard (Doctor Hu)
  - The Monkey King 2 (Tang Sanzang)
  - The Monkey King 3 (Tang Sanzang)
  - Detective Dee: The Four Heavenly Kings (Yuchi Zhenjin)
- Leonardo DiCaprio
  - Titanic (2004 Fuji TV edition) (Jack Dawson)
  - The Departed (Billy)
  - Body of Lies (Roger Ferris)
  - Inception (Cobb)
  - The Great Gatsby (Jay Gatsby)
  - Don't Look Up (Dr. Randall Mindy)
- Matt Damon
  - Hereafter (George Lonegan)
  - Contagion (Mitch Emhoff)
  - Promised Land (Steve Butler)
  - No Sudden Move (Mike Lowen/Mr. Big)
  - Air (Sonny Vaccaro)
  - Drive-Away Dolls (Senator Gary Channel)
- Ji Sung
  - Kim Su-ro, The Iron King (Kim Su-ro)
  - Royal Family (Han Ji-hoon)
  - The Great Seer (Mok Ji-sang)
  - Whatcha Wearin'? (Hyun-seung)
  - Innocent Defendant (Park Jung-woo)
- Shin Ha-kyun
  - Surprise (In-hoo)
  - A Man Who Went to Mars (Lee Seung-jae)
  - Save the Green Planet! (Lee Byeong-gu)
  - Welcome to Dongmakgol (Pyo Hyun-Chul)
  - The Front Line (Kang Eun-Pyo)
- Joseph Gordon-Levitt
  - Looper (Joe)
  - Sin City: A Dame to Kill For (Johnny)
  - The Walk (Philippe Petit)
  - Snowden (Edward Snowden)
  - Mr. Corman (Josh Corman)
- 12 Rounds 2: Reloaded (Tommy Weaver (Tom Stevens))
- 20,000 Leagues Under the Sea (2002 NHK-BS2 edition) (Pierre Arronax (Patrick Dempsey))
- Adam (Adam Raki (Hugh Dancy))
- Æon Flux (Oren Goodchild (Jonny Lee Miller))
- Alfie (Alfie Elkins Jr. (Jude Law))
- Anchorman: The Legend of Ron Burgundy (Brick Tamland (Steve Carell))
- Antarctic Journal (Kim Min-jae (Yoo Ji-tae))
- Any Day Now (Rudy Donatello (Alan Cumming))
- At the End of the Tunnel (Joaquín (Leonardo Sbaraglia))
- Babylon (James McKay (Tobey Maguire))
- Basic (Levi Kendall (Giovanni Ribisi))
- The Bay (Andy Warren (Joe Absolom))
- The Best Exotic Marigold Hotel (Sonny Kapoor (Dev Patel))
- Brotherhood of Blades (Lu Jian Xing (Wang Qianyuan))
- Bullet to the Head (Taylor Kwon (Sung Kang))
- The Captive (Matthew Lane (Ryan Reynolds))
- Charlie Countryman (Charlie Countryman (Shia LaBeouf))
- The City of Your Final Destination (Pete (Hiroyuki Sanada))
- Closer (Dan Woolf (Jude Law))
- Criminal (Rodrigo (Diego Luna))
- Daredevil (Matt Murdock / Daredevil (Charlie Cox))
- Daredevil: Born Again (Matt Murdock / Daredevil (Charlie Cox))
- The Darjeeling Limited (Francis (Owen Wilson))
- The Day After Tomorrow (Jason Evans (Dash Mihok))
- Dear John (John Tyree (Channing Tatum))
- Elektra (Kirigi (Will Yun Lee))
- Elser (Georg Elser (Christian Friedel))
- The Endless (Aaron Smith (Aaron Moorhead))
- The Fabelmans (Burt Fabelman (Paul Dano))
- Freddy vs. Jason (Will Rollins (Jason Ritter))
- Friday the 13th (Clay Miller (Jared Padalecki))
- Frozen (Dan Walker (Kevin Zegers))
- Garfield: The Movie (Jon Arbuckle (Breckin Meyer))
- Garfield: A Tail of Two Kitties (Jon Arbuckle (Breckin Meyer))
- Gilmore Girls (Christopher Hayden (David Sutcliffe))
- God of Gamblers II (Michael Chan / Little Knife (Andy Lau))
- Grey's Anatomy (Jackson Avery (Jesse Williams))
- Gulliver's Travels (Prince August (Olly Alexander))
- Happy Together (Ho Po-wing (Leslie Cheung))
- Hostage (Marshall "Mars" Krupcheck (Ben Foster))
- I Spy (Special Agent Alex Scott (Owen Wilson))
- Jesus Revolution (Lonnie Frisbee (Jonathan Roumie))
- John Wick: Chapter 4 (Shimazu Koji (Hiroyuki Sanada))
- Jurassic Park III (Billy Brennan (Alessandro Nivola))
- Jurassic World: Fallen Kingdom (Eli Mills (Rafe Spall))
- King's War (Xiang Yu (Peter Ho))
- Kingdom of Heaven (Balian (Orlando Bloom))
- Krrish 3 (Krishna Mehra / Krrish and Rohit Mehra (Hrithik Roshan)
- Leatherheads (Carter Rutherford (John Krasinski))
- The Lovers (Jay Fennel and James Stewart (Josh Hartnett))
- Luther (Mark North (Paul McGann))
- Match Point (Chris Wilton (Jonathan Rhys Meyers))
- Mojin: The Lost Legend (Hu Bayi (Chen Kun))
- The Monkey King (Erlang Shen (Peter Ho))
- Mood Indigo (Colin (Romain Duris))
- The Motorcycle Diaries (Che Guevara (Gael García Bernal))
- Mr. Holmes (Tamiki Umezaki (Hiroyuki Sanada))
- On the Edge (Toby (Jonathan Jackson))
- Only Murders in the Building (Tim Kono (Julian Cihi))
- The Pale Blue Eye (Augustus Landor (Christian Bale))
- Penny Dreadful (Ethan Chandler (Josh Hartnett))
- Peter Rabbit (In-flight edition) (Thomas McGregor (Domhnall Gleeson))
- Playing by Heart (Mark (Jay Mohr))
- Pride & Prejudice (Mr. George Wickham (Rupert Friend))
- The Private Lives of Pippa Lee (Chris Nadeau (Keanu Reeves))
- Resident Evil: Extinction (Alex Slater (Matthew Marsden))
- The Rundown (Travis Alfred Walker (Seann William Scott))
- Rush Hour 3 (Kenji (Hiroyuki Sanada))
- The Sandlot 2 (David "Rocket" Durango (Max Lloyd-Jones))
- The Second Best Exotic Marigold Hotel (Sonny Kapoor (Dev Patel))
- She-Hulk: Attorney at Law (Matt Murdock / Daredevil (Charlie Cox))
- Silk (Hervé Joncour (Michael Pitt))
- The Skeleton Key (Luke Marshall (Peter Sarsgaard))
- Sky Fighters (Sébastien "Fahrenheit" Vallois (Clovis Cornillac))
- Son of God (Jesus Christ (Diogo Morgado))
- The Sorcerer and the White Snake (Xu Xian (Raymond Lam))
- The Sting (Johnny "Kelly" Hooker (Robert Redford))
- The Strangers (James Hoyt (Scott Speedman))
- Supernatural (season 3 onwards) (Sam Winchester (Jared Padalecki))
- Taking Lives (Martin Asher (Ethan Hawke))
- Terminator 3: Rise of the Machines (Scott Mason (Mark Famiglietti))
- There Will Be Blood (Paul Sunday and Eli Sunday (Paul Dano))
- Third Person (Rick (James Franco))
- The Third Way of Love (Lin Qizheng (Song Seung-heon))
- Thirteen Days (2003 TV Asahi edition) (Robert F. Kennedy (Steven Culp))
- Transcendence (Max Waters (Paul Bettany))
- A Very Long Engagement (Manech Langonnet (Gaspard Ulliel))
- Warm Bodies (R (Nicholas Hoult))
- Watchmen (Mr. Phillips (Tom Mison))
- Water for Elephants (Jacob Jankowski (Robert Pattinson))
- Whiplash (Andrew Neiman (Miles Teller))
- White House Farm (Colin Caffell (Mark Stanley))
- Xanadu (Sonny Malone (Michael Beck))
- XXX: State of the Union (Kyle Steele (Scott Speedman))
- You're Beautiful (Kang Shin-woo (Jung Yong-hwa))

==== Animation ====
- Batman: The Brave and the Bold (Green Arrow)
