= Cho Chang-ho (film director) =

South Korean film director and screenwriter

- Born: 1972 (age 53–54); Hongcheon County, South Korea
- Education: Seoul Institute of the Arts
- Occupations: Film director, screenwriter
- Years active: 1996-present

Korean name
- Hangul: 조창호
- RR: Jo Changho
- MR: Cho Ch'angho

Cho Chang-ho (born 1972) is a South Korean film director and screenwriter. Cho wrote and directed The Peter Pan Formula (2006) and Lovers Vanished (2010).

== Career ==
Born in 1972 in Hongcheon County, Cho Chang-ho studied film directing at the Seoul Institute of the Arts. He began his filmmaking career as an assistant director on Yim Soon-rye's Three Friends (1996), Kim Ki-duk's Birdcage Inn (1998) and Bad Guy (2002), and Byun Hyuk's Interview (2000). In 2002, Cho wrote and directed A Little Indian Boy, a short film about a disabled boy and his sister who live by the seashore.

He made his feature directorial debut in 2005 with The Peter Pan Formula, a coming-of-age film about a high school swimming prodigy who suddenly decides to quit, then faces skyrocketing credit card bills when his mother becomes comatose after a suicide attempt. It was invited to screen at several international film festivals, and it took the Jury Prize at the 9th Deauville Asian Film Festival, while Cho won Best Young Director (or Best First Feature Film) at the 27th Durban International Film Festival (On Joo-wan won Best Actor at DIFF as well). The Peter Pan Formula received a theatrical release in South Korea in 2006.

In 2007, alongside fellow directors Park Soo-young and Kim Sung-ho, Cho joined Fantastic Parasuicides, an omnibus of three short films that center on people who undergo surreal experiences in the moment they decide to kill themselves. In Cho's segment "Fly Away, Chicken!," Kim Nam-jin played a suicidal police officer who witnesses two men sexually assaulting a woman, then later uses two of the three bullets in his gun to kill them, leaving the last one for himself.

Cho then cast Kim Nam-gil and Hwang Woo-seul-hye in Lovers Vanished (2010), a moody melodrama about an HIV/AIDS-infected fugitive who becomes the chef of an emotionally withdrawn restaurateur. Cho said, "The first phrase that pops into mind when I think about this movie is 'maximization of emotion.' Vanished asks how a person overcome with despair can continue to exist and become curious about his future. I wanted to deliver that message by showing the process of how the two people try to achieve their love."

== Filmography ==
- Three Friends (1996) - assistant director
- Birdcage Inn (1998) - assistant director
- Interview (2000) - assistant director
- Bad Guy (2002) - assistant director
- A Little Indian Boy (short film, 2002) - director, screenwriter
- The Peter Pan Formula (2006) - director, screenwriter
- Fantastic Parasuicides (segment: "Fly Away, Chicken!") (2007) - director, screenwriter
- Lovers Vanished (2010) - director, screenwriter
- Another Way (2015) - director, screenwriter

== Awards ==
- 2006 27th Durban International Film Festival: Best Young Director (The Peter Pan Formula)
