= Monochrome Mobius: Rights and Wrongs Forgotten =

2022 video game

- Developer(s): Aquaplus; Design Act
- Publisher(s): JP: Aquaplus; WW: Shiravune (Win); WW: NIS America (PS4, PS5)
- Director(s): Kazuo Ninomiya
- Producer(s): Naoya Shimokawa
- Artist(s): Mi
- Writer(s): Munemitsu Suga
- Composer(s): Michio Kinugasa; Junya Matsuoka; Shinya Ishikawa; Huang Yanling; Hironori Mutoh
- Series: Utawarerumono
- Engine: Unity
- Platform(s): PlayStation 4; PlayStation 5; Windows
- Release: PlayStation 4, PlayStation 5: JP: November 17, 2022; NA: September 5, 2023; EU/AU: September 8, 2023; Windows: WW: November 17, 2022
- Genre(s): Role-playing
- Mode(s): Single-player

Monochrome Mobius: Rights and Wrongs Forgotten is a role-playing video game developed by Aquaplus and Design Act. A part of the Utawarerumono series, the game commemorates the series' 20th anniversary and was released on November 17, 2022 for the PlayStation 4 and PlayStation 5 in Japan, and Windows worldwide. A worldwide release for the PlayStation 4 and PlayStation 5 versions was in September 2023.

== Gameplay ==
A combat encounter early in the game.

The gameplay of Monochrome Mobius: Rights and Wrongs Forgotten features a turn-based combat system, fully 3D characters and free camera movement. It also features field exploration and plays like a traditional Japanese role-playing video game, in contrast to the grid-based tactical role-playing combat system and visual novel elements found in the previous mainline titles of the Utawarerumono series. The player can issue commands to characters to launch attacks, use tools and initiate combat tactics.

During combat encounters, a circle in the top-left corner of the game screen known as the "Action Ring" indicates the current turn order of units and comprises three inner rings. After each turn, the units rotate clockwise on the inner rings and the further they are from the end of an inner ring, the longer they will have to wait for their turn to commence. Units on the innermost ring will have the most frequent turns and players can manipulate the turn order to enter the innermost ring, either by staggering opponents and attacking them while they are in a staggered state to cause them to collapse, or activating an overcharged state from a filled gauge that accumulates through dealing damage, receiving damage or defending, and using the "Ascend" combat skill unlocked in that state.

== Plot ==
Monochrome Mobius: Rights and Wrongs Forgotten is set prior to the events in Utawarerumono: Mask of Deception. In the province of Ennakamuy that borders the Yamato Empire, the story follows Oshtor, who resides with his mother and younger sister. During an investigation assigned by his local lord, Oshtor encounters a mysterious girl by the name of Shunya who informs him that his father currently believed to be deceased is still alive. Shocked by this revelation, but catching a vestige of his father in Shunya and his determination to find the truth, Oshtor partners up with her and the pair travel to a country that cannot be found on the map, Arva Shulan, beginning the pursuit of his father.

== Development and release ==
In July 2019, Aquaplus COO and series producer Naoya Shimokawa confirmed that there were multiple video games in development for the Utawarerumono series for consoles, later reiterating this in January 2020. The game was officially revealed in November 2021 as Monochrome Moebius: Toki no Taika, slated for a 2022 release in Japan with platforms unannounced at the time.

The opening sequence was animated by White Fox, the studio that produced the animated opening sequences and anime adaptations of Utawarerumono: Mask of Deception and Utawarerumono: Mask of Truth, and features the theme song "Toki no Taika" sung by Suara. Returning staff members from the main trilogy of visual novels in the series include producer and music director Shimokawa, and writer Munemitsu Suga. Tatsuki Amaduyu and Misato Mitsumi are credited for the original character designs.

With the omission of the Utawarerumono series name from the game's title and its genre moving away from the grid-based tactical role-playing combat system found in the main visual novel trilogy, Aquaplus wanted the character designs to be distinguishable from past entries in the series to make the game feel like a brand new work, choosing Mi as its character designer for this reason. Taking care to ensure the new designs of returning characters from previous titles in their younger forms were not dramatically changed so as not to displease long-time fans, Amaduyu and Mitsumi, who both served as character designers for the visual novels were tasked with supervising Mi's artwork to maintain consistency with the original designs.

Music was a key element for Shimokawa as a composer and Aquaplus, placing significant emphasis on the soundtrack and environmental sound design matching the in-game scenes. Over 100 tracks have been recorded for the game's soundtrack. Shimokawa also reported that as of April 2022, the game's development was 90% finished with it being complete in content, and work in progress on tweaking the game balance and debugging.

The game was initially set to be released on September 8, 2022 in Japan for the PlayStation 4, PlayStation 5 and Windows, but was later delayed to October 20, 2022 for quality improvements, then to November 17, 2022 due to a COVID-19 infection among the development team. An English localization of the Windows version by Shiravune titled Monochrome Mobius: Rights and Wrongs Forgotten was released simultaneously with the Japanese release on Steam worldwide, with early purchasers receiving a digital artbook and a digital soundtrack containing 30 tracks as bonuses. NIS America released the PlayStation 4 and PlayStation 5 versions in North America on September 5, 2023, and in Europe and Oceania on September 8.

In November 2024, a game described as a continuation of Monochrome Mobius: Rights and Wrongs Forgotten was announced at the Great Aquaplus Festival -30th Anniversary- event for a scheduled late 2025 release in Japan. The game is titled Utawarerumono: Shiro e no Michishirube in Japanese.

== Reception ==
Siliconera's Josh Tolentino found the game's story and characterization strong while lacking in the depth of its combat, noting that fans of the previous Utawarerumono games would be more served by its worldbuilding than newcomers to the series. Thomas Knight of NookGaming agreed that the story is strong, calling it "excellent, if a bit slow at times in the second half" and indicated enjoyment of the battle system, despite being basic. Conversely, James Galizio of RPG Site noted that there are elements of the game which deserve credit, but criticized the strength of the narrative overall, the pacing, and the combat.

During the game's launch week in Japan, the PlayStation 4 version reached fourth place in game sales charts with 9,066 units sold and the PlayStation 5 version reached eleventh place with 4,950 units sold.
