= The People Upstairs =

The People Upstairs may refer to:

- The People Upstairs (2020 film), written and directed by Cesc Gay
- The People Upstairs (2025 film), directed by Ha Jung-woo
