= Nocturnal (2025 film) =

2025 film by Kim Jin-hwang

- Theatrical release poster
- Hangul: 브로큰
- Lit.: Broken
- RR: Beurokeun
- MR: Pŭrok'ŭn
- Directed by: Kim Jin-hwang
- Written by: Kim Jin-hwang
- Produced by: Lee Min-woo; Han Jae-deok
- Starring: Ha Jung-woo; Kim Nam-gil; Yoo Da-in; Jung Man-sik
- Cinematography: Park Jung-hoon
- Edited by: Kim Sang-bum
- Music by: Hwang Sang-jun
- Production companies: Eulji Planning; Sanai Pictures
- Distributed by: Barunson E&A
- Release date: February 5, 2025
- Running time: 99 minutes
- Country: South Korea
- Language: Korean
- Box office: US$1.2 million

Nocturnal (Korean: 브로큰) is a 2025 South Korean neo-noir crime thriller film written and directed by Kim Jin-hwang, starring Ha Jung-woo, Kim Nam-gil, Yoo Da-in, and Jung Man-sik. It follows Min-tae's relentless pursuit of the truth after his brother's death, his sister-in-law's disappearance, and a bestselling novel that eerily predicted the crime. The film was released on January 22, 2025.

== Plot ==
Seok-tae, a drug addict and gangster, is found dead under suspicious circumstances. His brother Min-tae, who has distanced himself from the criminal world, begins searching for the perpetrator. Around the same time, Seok-tae's wife, Cha Moon-young, and their child disappear. The police launch an investigation as tensions rise within the local underworld.

Prior to his death, Seok-tae had been involved in drug distribution connected to the son of a powerful CEO, who falls into a coma after consuming narcotics allegedly supplied by him. Chang-mo, Seok-tae's boss and Min-tae's former superior, warns Min-tae not to interfere, suggesting that influential figures are involved.

Suspicion gradually centers on Moon-young. It is revealed that she had endured years of domestic abuse at the hands of Seok-tae. Her connection to renowned novelist Kang Ho-ryeong further complicates the case. Kang's novel Nocturnal depicts events strikingly similar to Seok-tae's death and was written before the crime occurred. As investigators learn that the novel was inspired by Moon-young's experiences, both the police and Min-tae grow convinced that she may have played a role in orchestrating the murder.

Determined to find her, Min-tae recruits Byung-gyu, one of Chang-mo's subordinates, while Kang searches for Moon-young in an effort to protect her. After a series of confrontations, Moon-young secretly reveals her location to Kang. Min-tae follows him to a bus terminal, where Min-tae, Kang, Moon-young, and the police converge.

Before the truth can fully emerge, Byung-gyu suddenly kills Moon-young and flees. Enraged, Min-tae pursues him and discovers that the killing was ordered by Chang-mo. The revelation exposes Chang-mo as the true mastermind behind Seok-tae's murder. On the night of the incident, both Seok-tae and the CEO's son had consumed large quantities of drugs; when the CEO's son fell into a coma, Chang-mo executed Seok-tae to appease the CEO.

It is also revealed that Moon-young had been a direct witness to Seok-tae's murder and had long wished for his death after years of abuse. Chang-mo had spared her out of sympathy and on the condition that she disappear permanently. Following Seok-tae's funeral, Min-tae confronts Chang-mo, kills his men, and forces a confession confirming his responsibility and the gang's subservience to corporate influence. Min-tae ultimately kills Chang-mo and walks away.

== Cast ==
- Ha Jung-woo as Bae Min-tae, a former renowned gangster.
- Kim Nam-gil as Kang Ho-ryeong, a famous novelist and author of Nocturnal.
- Yoo Da-in as Cha Moon-young, Seok-tae's wife.
- Jung Man-sik as Seok Chang-mo, a local gang boss.
- Lim Seong-jae as Byung-gyu, a low-ranking gangster who works for Chang-mo.
- Heo Sung-tae as Team Leader Park.
- Lee Seol as Detective Min.
- Kim Chan-hyung as Jae-man, a lieutenant to Chang-mo.
- Jang Nam-bu as Kang-ho,a local gang boss.
- Park Jong-hwan as Bae Seok-tae,a gangster works for Chang-mo.
- Cha Rae-hyung as Yeong-seop.
- Seo Hyun-woo as Detective Son.
- Jung Jae-kwang as Cha Myung-woo.
- Seo Hye-rin as the teahouse owner.
- Cha Mi-kyung as the landlady.

== Production ==
Principal photography began in January 2021 and filming ended on April of the same year.

The film marks the second time Ha Jung-woo and Kim Nam-gil have appeared together in a work following The Closet.

== Release ==
Nocturnal premiered in South Korean theaters on January 22, 2025, released by Barunson E&A.

== Reception ==
The film was released on February 5, 2025, on 805 screens. It opened at first place at the South Korean box office with 42,562 running audiences.

As of February 9, 2025, the film has grossed US$814,912 from 128,926 admissions.
