= Boat (2009 film) =

- Theatrical poster
- Directed by: Kim Young-nam
- Written by: Aya Watanabe
- Produced by: Osaumo Kubota; Lee Juno; Min Jung-hwan
- Starring: Ha Jung-woo; Tsumabuki Satoshi
- Cinematography: Takahiro Tsutai
- Edited by: Kim Hyeong-ju
- Music by: Park Ji-woong
- Production companies: IMJ Pictures; Kraze Pictures
- Distributed by: Showbox Mediaplex; Phantom Film
- Release date: May 28, 2009
- Running time: 115 minutes
- Countries: Japan; South Korea
- Languages: Japanese; Korean
- Box office: ₩13,748 $69,314

Boat (Korean: 보트, translit. Boteu; Japanese: ノーボーイズ、ノークライ, alt. title No Boys, No Cry, formerly known as House) is a 2009 film directed by Kim Young-nam and starring Ha Jung-woo and Satoshi Tsumabuki in the lead roles. It is a South Korean-Japanese co-production. The film charts the experiences and cross cultural friendship of a couple of smugglers.

== Plot ==
Hyung-gu, a young smuggler, was raised by his boss Bo-kyeong after his mother left him when he was six years old. Hyung-gu's boss asks him to work with a Japanese man named Toru; Toru needs the money to support his younger sister. Hyung-gu and Toru are forced to live on Hyung-gu's boat and kidnap a Korean woman named Ji-su, which leads to trouble.

== Cast ==
- Ha Jung-woo as Hyung-gu
- Satoshi Tsumabuki as Toru
- Cha Soo-yeon as Ji-su
- Shihori Kanjiya as Toru's ex-girlfriend
- Eri Tokunaga as Toru's younger sister
- Lee Dae-yeon as Bo-kyeong
- Tasuku Emoto as Takashi
- Morio Agata
- Kim Bu-seon
