= 13th Korea Drama Awards =

2022 edition of award ceremony

- Date: October 8, 2022
- Hosted by: Kim Hwan, Gong Seo-young

The 13th Korea Drama Awards is an awards ceremony for excellence in television in South Korea. It was held on October 8, 2022 after a break of 2 years.

== Nominations and winners ==
The ceremony was held in Gyeongnam Culture and Arts Center on October 8, 2022.

Grand Prize (Daesang)	Best Drama
Ha Jung-woo – Narco-Saints; Kim Nam-gil – Through the Darkness; Park Eun-bin – Extraordinary Attorney Woo; Kim Tae-ri – Twenty-Five Twenty-One	Extraordinary Attorney Woo (ENA); D.P. (Netflix); Twenty-Five Twenty-One (tvN); Our Blues (tvN)
Lifetime Achievement Award	Best Director
Choi Bool-am	Park Joon-hwa – Alchemy of Souls; Jung Ji-hyun - Twenty-Five Twenty-One; Seong Jun-hae - Bravo, My Life; Oh Chung-hwan - Big Mouth
Top Excellence Award, Actor	Top Excellence Award, Actress
Kim Bum – Ghost Doctor; Im Si-wan – Tracer; Lee Jun-ho – The Red Sleeve; Ji Chang-wook – The Sound of Magic	Shin Hyun-been – Reflection of You; Park Min-young – Forecasting Love and Weather; Han So-hee – My Name; Jung So-min – Alchemy of Souls
Excellence Award, Actor	Excellence Award, Actress
Lee Ki-woo – My Liberation Notes; Heo Sung-tae – Adamas; Jung Sang-hoon – Becoming Witch; Jin Seon-kyu – Through the Darkness	Jeon So-min – Show Window: The Queen's House; Han Bo-reum – Insider; Uee – Ghost Doctor; Jin Kyung – Extraordinary Attorney Woo
Best Supporting Actor	Best Supporting Actress
Park Ho-san – Today's Webtoon; Lee Hyun-wook – Remarriage & Desires; Kim Kwang-kyu – Business Proposal; Yang Kyung-won – Big Mouth	Hwang Bo-ra – Kiss Sixth Sense; Ok Ja-yeon – Big Mouth; Kang Mal-geum – Military Prosecutor Doberman; Kim Shin-rok – If You Wish Upon Me
Best New Actor	Best New Actress
Kim Do-hoon – Today's Webtoon; Bae Hyun-sung – Our Blues; Tang Jun-sang – Racket Boys; Yang Been-lae – My Wonderful Life	Bona – Twenty-Five Twenty-One; Bae Woo-hee – Business Proposal; Cho Yi-hyun – All of Us Are Dead; Byeon Seo-yun – Hellbound
Global Excellence Award	Global Star Award
Lee Jae-wook – Alchemy of Souls	L – Royal Secret Agent
KDA Award	
Min Chae-eun
