= Through the Darkness (TV series) =

2022 South Korean television series

- Promotional poster
- Also known as: Those Who Read Hearts of Evil
- Hangul: 악의 마음을 읽는 자들
- Lit.: Those Who Read the Minds of Evil
- RR: Agui maeumeul ingneun jadeul
- MR: Agŭi maŭmŭl ingnŭn chadŭl
- Genre: Crime; Thriller
- Created by: Studio S; Wavve (production investment)
- Based on: Those Who Read the Minds of Evil by Kwon Il-yong and Ko Na-mu
- Developed by: Lee Seul-gi; Kim Mi-joo
- Written by: Seol Yi-na
- Directed by: Park Bo-ram
- Starring: Kim Nam-gil; Jin Seon-kyu; Kim So-jin
- Music by: Gaemi
- Country of origin: South Korea
- Original language: Korean
- No. of episodes: 12

Production
- Executive producer: Park Young-soo
- Producers: Han Jeong-hwan; Kim Si-hwan; Park Ki-yeol
- Production company: Studio S

Original release
- Network: SBS TV
- Release: January 14 – March 12, 2022

Through the Darkness (Korean: 악의 마음을 읽는 자들) is a 2022 South Korean television series starring Kim Nam-gil, Jin Seon-kyu and Kim So-jin. It is based on the 2018 non-fiction book of the same title co-written by Korea's first criminal profiler Kwon Il-yong and journalist-turned-author Ko Na-mu, which highlights Kwon's field experiences. It aired on SBS TV from January 14 to March 12, 2022, every Friday and Saturday at 22:00 (KST).

== Synopsis ==
Set during the early days of implementation of criminal behavior analysis in the South Korean law enforcement, the series is about the very first criminal profiler who struggles to determine the behavioural patterns of serial killers while trying to prove to society that criminal behavior analysis is the future of criminal investigation.

== Cast ==
=== Main ===
- Kim Nam-gil as Song Ha-young, profiler of the Criminal Behavior Analysis team at Seoul Metropolitan Police Agency's (SMPA) Scientific Investigation division.
  - Lee Chun-moo as young Song Ha-young
- Jin Seon-kyu as Gook Young-soo, leader of the Criminal Behavior Analysis team.
- Kim So-jin as Yoon Tae-goo, team leader of the Mobile Investigation Unit at SMPA.

=== Supporting ===
==== Criminal Behavior Analysis team ====
- Ryeoun as Jung Woo-joo, the person who provides information and analyzes various incident data. He later joins Ha-young and Young-soo's team.

==== Mobile Investigation Unit ====
- Lee Dae-yeon as Baek Jun-sik, head of SMPA's Criminal division.
- Kim Won-hae as Heo Gil-pyo, head of SMPA's Mobile Investigation Unit.
- Jeong Soon-won as Nam Il-young, the youngest member of Mobile Investigation Unit who respects and follows Tae-goo unconditionally.

==== Others ====
- Kim Hyun as Hwa-yeon's mother
- Gong Sung-ha as Choi Yoon-ji, a journalist from online media Fact Today.
- Kim Hye-ok as Park Young-shin, Ha-young's mother.

=== Extended ===
- Go Geon-han as Yang Yong-cheol, a man who claimed to be the "Red Hat" murderer.
- Seo Dong-gap as Kim Bong-sik, the first commander of the squadron.
- Hong Woo-jin as Oh In-tak, a forensic officer in SMPA's forensic team and is a junior of Young-soo.
- Oh Seung-hoon as Jo Kang-moo, a serial killer.
- Oh Hee-joon as Kang Yoo-min
- Han Joon-woo as Goo Young-chun, a psychopathic serial killer.
- Kim Jung-hee as Nam Ki-tae, a psychopathic serial killer.
- Na Cheol as Woo Ho-seong, a psychotic serial killer.

=== Special appearances ===
- Jung Man-sik as Park Dae-woong, crime squad leader.
- Hwang Jung-min as the key witness of a crime.
- Oh Kyung-ju as Bang Ki-hoon, a suspect who was investigated for killing his own girlfriend.
- Ha Do-kwon as Shin Ki-ho, the director of the online media Fact Today.

== Release ==
It was initially reported that the series was likely to be aired in October 2021. However, it was later confirmed in November that it would premiere on January 14, 2022.

== Original soundtrack ==
=== Part 1 ===
Released on January 15, 2022
No.	Title	Lyrics	Music	Artist	Length
1.	"Lullaby" (스윗해)	Midnight	Midnight	Nerd Connection	3:36
2.	"Lullaby" (스윗해; Inst.)		Midnight		3:36
Total length:					7:12

=== Part 2 ===
Released on January 29, 2022
No.	Title	Lyrics	Music	Artist	Length
1.	"Can't Run Away"	Gaemi; Lee Jun-hwa	Gaemi; Lee Jun-hwa	Hong Isaac	3:05
2.	"Can't Run Away" (Inst.)		Gaemi; Lee Jun-hwa		3:05
Total length:					6:10

=== Part 3 ===
Released on March 5, 2022
No.	Title	Lyrics	Music	Artist	Length
1.	"Bloom and Fall Alone" (홀로 피고 진 꽃)	Kwon Bin-ki	Kwon Bin-ki	Kim So-yeon	3:27
2.	"Bloom and Fall Alone" (홀로 피고 진 꽃; Inst.)		Kwon Bin-ki		3:27
Total length:					6:54

=== Part 4 ===
Released on March 12, 2022
No.	Title	Lyrics	Music	Artist	Length
1.	"The Leopard of Killimanjaro" (킬리만자로의 표범)	Yang In-ja	Kim Hee-gap	4Men	4:21
2.	"The Leopard of Killimanjaro" (킬리만자로의 표범; Inst.)		Kim Hee-gap		4:21
Total length:					8:42

== Viewership ==
Through the Darkness : South Korea viewers per episode (millions)

Season	Episode number												Average
Season	1	2	3	4	5	6	7	8	9	10	11	12	Average
1	1.210	1.398	1.533	1.726	1.442	1.388	1.508	1.056	1.610	1.251	1.411	1.426	1.413

Source: Audience measurement performed nationwide by Nielsen Korea.

Average TV viewership ratings
Ep.	Original broadcast date	Average audience share		
Ep.	Original broadcast date	Nielsen Korea		TNmS
Ep.	Original broadcast date	Nationwide	Seoul	Nationwide
1	January 14, 2022	6.2% (14th)	6.4%	5.2% (14th)
2	January 15, 2022	7.5% (7th)	8.1% (5th)	5.2% (17th)
3	January 21, 2022	7.9% (9th)	8.6% (9th)	5.6% (12th)
4	January 22, 2022	8.2% (5th)	8.6% (2nd)	6.2% (6th)
5	January 28, 2022	7.5% (10th)	8.6% (6th)	6.0% (9th)
6	January 29, 2022	6.9% (9th)	7.8% (6th)	5.1% (16th)
7	February 25, 2022 (Note: The series was suspended for three weeks due to the broadcast of 2022 Winter Olympics.)	7.4% (8th)	8.0% (5th)	6.6% (11th)
8	February 26, 2022	5.0% (19th)	5.1% (17th)	4.9% (18th)
9	March 4, 2022	8.3% (3rd)	8.9% (3rd)	6.8% (10th)
10	March 5, 2022	6.0% (12th)	6.2% (11th)	4.6% (17th)
11	March 11, 2022	7.3% (7th)	7.9% (6th)	6.3% (11th)
12	March 12, 2022	7.0% (8th)	7.6% (5th)	5.9% (11th)
Average		7.1%	7.7%	5.7%
In the table above, the blue numbers represent the lowest ratings and the red numbers represent the highest ratings.

== Awards and nominations ==
Name of the award ceremony, year presented, category, nominee of the award, and the result of the nomination
Award ceremony	Year	Category	Nominee	Result	Ref.
APAN Star Awards	2022	Top Excellence Award, Actor in a Miniseries	Kim Nam-gil	Nominated	
APAN Star Awards	2022	Excellence Award, Actor in a Miniseries	Jin Seon-kyu	Won	
Asian Television Awards	2022	Best Picture Award	Through the Darkness	Won	
Asian Television Awards	2022	Best Drama Series	Through the Darkness	Nominated	
Baeksang Arts Awards	2022	Best Actor – Television	Kim Nam-gil	Nominated	
Blue Dragon Series Awards	2022	Best Actor	Kim Nam-gil	Nominated	
Blue Dragon Series Awards	2022	Best Drama	Through the Darkness	Nominated	
Korea Drama Awards	2022	Grand Prize (Daesang)	Kim Nam-gil	Nominated	
Korea Drama Awards	2022	Excellence Award, Actor	Jin Seon-kyu	Nominated	
New York Festivals: TV & Film Awards	2023	Entertainment Program – Crime Drama	Through the Darkness	Finalist	
SBS Drama Awards	2022	Grand Prize (Daesang)	Kim Nam-gil	Won	
SBS Drama Awards	2022	Excellence Award, Actor in a Miniseries Genre/Fantasy Drama	Jin Seon-kyu	Won	
SBS Drama Awards	2022	Best New Actor	Ryeoun	Won	
SBS Drama Awards	2022	Best New Actress	Gong Sung-ha	Won	
SBS Drama Awards	2022	Director's Award	Kim Nam-gil	Nominated	
SBS Drama Awards	2022	Top Excellence Award, Actor in a Miniseries Genre/Fantasy Drama	Kim Nam-gil	Nominated	
SBS Drama Awards	2022	Top Excellence Award, Actress in a Miniseries Genre/Fantasy Drama	Kim So-jin	Nominated	
SBS Drama Awards	2022	Best Supporting Actor in a Miniseries Genre/Fantasy Drama	Kim Won-hae	Nominated	
SBS Drama Awards	2022	Best Supporting Team	Through the Darkness (Note: Kim So-jin, Kim Nam-gil, Jin Seon-kyu, Ryeoun, Kim Won-hae, Jung Se-woon and Lee Dae-yeon)	Nominated	
Seoul International Drama Awards	2022	Best Actor	Kim Nam-gil	Nominated	
