= Boss (2025 film) =

2025 film by Ra Hee-chan

- Theatrical release poster
- Hangul: 보스
- RR: Boseu
- MR: Posŭ
- Directed by: Ra Hee-chan
- Screenplay by: Ra Hee-chan; Lee Kyu-bok; Yoon Seo-hyun
- Based on: Once a Gangster by Felix Chong
- Produced by: Kim Won-kuk
- Starring: Jo Woo-jin; Jung Kyung-ho; Park Ji-hwan; Lee Kyu-hyung; Oh Dal-su; Hwang Woo-seul-hye; Jung Yoo-jin; Ko Chang-seok
- Cinematography: Yang Hyun-suk
- Music by: Mowg
- Production company: Hive Media Corp.
- Distributed by: Mindmark
- Release dates: September 18, 2025 (BIFF); October 3, 2025 (South Korea)
- Running time: 98 minutes
- Country: South Korea
- Language: Korean
- Box office: US$16.2 million

Boss (Korean: 보스) is a 2025 South Korean action comedy film directed by Ra Hee-chan. The film is a remake of the Hong Kong film Once a Gangster (2010). It stars Jo Woo-jin, Jung Kyung-ho, and Park Ji-hwan as gang members caught in a rivalry, torn between the fight for dominance within their ranks and the pursuit of their own personal ambitions. The cast also includes Lee Kyu-hyung, Oh Dal-su, Hwang Woo-seul-hye, Jung Yoo-jin, Ko Chang-seok, and Lee Sung-min.

The film had its world premiere at the 30th Busan International Film Festival on September 18, 2025 in Korean Cinema Today section. It was released in theatres on October 3, 2025, coinciding with Chuseok holidays.

== Synopsis ==
Three contenders vie for the boss' chair: Soon-tae, the top contender who dreams not of running the mob but of conquering the nation with his Chinese restaurant Mimiru; Kang-pyo, who has plenty of influence within the organization but staked his life on tango; and Pan-ho, the only one who truly desires to be boss yet no one thinks he is fit for the role. With undercover cop Tae-gyu infiltrating Mimiru as a delivery man, the fierce battle spirals into unpredictable chaos.

== Cast ==
- Jo Woo-jin as Soon-tae
- Jung Kyung-ho as Kang-pyo
- Park Ji-hwan as Pan-ho
- Lee Kyu-hyung as Tae-gyu
- Oh Dal-su as In-sul
- Hwang Woo-seul-hye as Ji-yeong, Soon-tae's wife
- Jung Yoo-jin as Yeon-im
- Ko Chang-seok as Manager Chu
- Lee Han-wi as Jang Chun-sik
- Joo Jin-mo as Bae Seok-dong
- Gil Hae-yeon as Mrs. Hong
- Lee Sung-min as Im Dae-soo, boss
- Jung Sang-hoon as bank clerk

== Production ==
In November 2022, the cast of the film was finalised. Filming began in 2023. The film was a remake of the 2010 Hong Kong film Once a Gangster directed by Felix Chong.

== Release ==
Boss had its world premiere in the 'Korean Cinema Today - Special Premiere' section at the 30th Busan International Film Festival on September 18, 2025. It was released in South Korean theaters on October 3, 2025 coinciding with Chuseok holidays.

In March 2024, Finecut acquired the international sales rights of the film and introduced it at the FilMart in Hong Kong.

== Reception ==
=== Box office ===
The film was released on October 3, 2025 on 1167 screens. It opened at the top, recording 238,895 viewers on its opening day at the Korean box office. The film surpassed one million viewers in 5 days of its release on October 7, 2025, and on October 12, in ten days, it surpassed 2 million cumulative viewers becoming the 6th Korean film of 2025 to do so.

As of December 3, 2025, the film has grossed US$15,904,838 from 2,437,328 admissions.
