= Kim Nam-gil =

South Korean actor (born 1980)

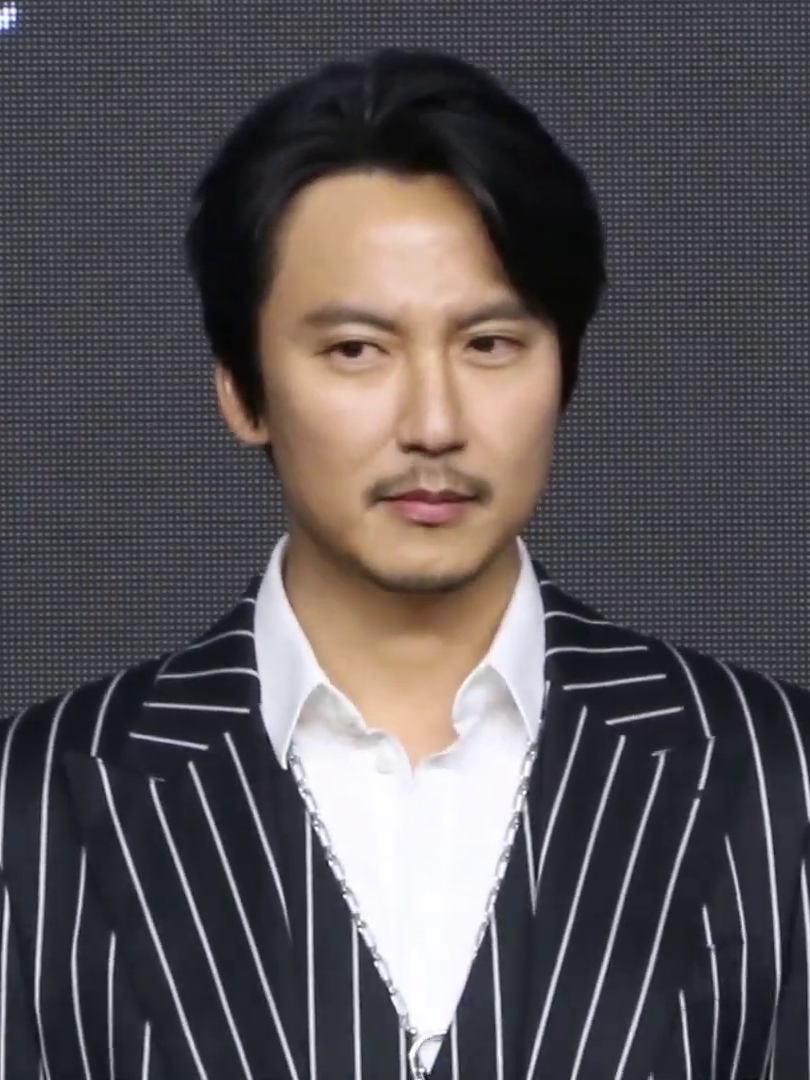
- Kim in December 2022
- Born: March 13, 1980 (age 46); Seoul, South Korea
- Education: Hankuk University of Foreign Studies
- Occupations: Actor; film producer; director; singer
- Years active: 1999–present
- Agent: Gilstory ENT
- Works: Filmography; discography; theater

Korean name
- Hangul: 김남길
- Hanja: 金南佶
- RR: Gim Namgil
- MR: Kim Namgil
- Website: gilstoryent.com/ko/artist_kimnamgil.php

Kim Nam-gil (Korean: 김남길; born March 13, 1980) is a South Korean actor, producer, director, singer and philanthropist. He had his breakthrough role as Silla politician Bidam in the historical series Queen Seondeok (2009), and became known for his roles in period drama Portrait of a Beauty (2008), adventure film The Pirates (2014), disaster blockbuster Pandora (2016), crime thriller Memoir of a Murderer (2017) and the crime-comedy television drama The Fiery Priest (2019).

Outside acting, Kim is the founder and CEO of a non-profit organization Gilstory that focuses on preserving cultural heritage, promoting arts and raising special purpose relief funds. Kim is known for his versatility as an actor and for often balancing projects with commercial value and roles that are artistic in nature. He was placed 17th in the top 40 most powerful stars in Korea 2020 by Forbes. On February 3, 2021, Kim launched Gilstory ENT, a comprehensive entertainment company, together with Han Jae Deok, head of film production company Sanai Pictures.

== Career ==
=== Beginnings ===
Kim began his acting career on television with a minor role in the 1999 KBS youth drama School 1. Four years later, he passed the 2003 Talent Audition conducted annually by MBC, and appeared in various minor roles on the network's shows, such as Be Strong, Geum-soon!. During this time, he was using the stage name Lee Han, which he made up to avoid confusion with Kang Nam-gil, another Korean actor with a similar name, and to give himself a more sophisticated image. In the following years he took on more supporting roles in television dramas, among them Goodbye Solo, Lovers, and When Spring Comes. Kim debuted on the big-screen in 2004 gangster movie Low life. In 2006, he made the bold decision to portray a homosexual character in the controversial queer indie No Regret in a role which included several gay sex scenes. The film was critically praised and traveled the film festival circuit, being shown among others in the Panorama section of the 57th Berlin Film Festival. He was then cast in 2008's Public Enemy Returns, where he worked with the actor Jung Jae-young. Kim had stated in interviews that Jung Jae-young, who attended the same high school he did, had been his role model as an actor. Upon the influence of the film's director Kang Woo-suk (but against the advice of his agent and manager), Kim stopped using the stage name Lee Han and reverted to his birth name. Later that year, he played his first leading role in a major commercial film, Portrait of a Beauty. Though his co-star Kim Min-sun garnered most of the attention for the erotic costume drama, Kim's strong performance did not go unnoticed.

=== Breakthrough and rising popularity ===
In 2009, Kim was cast as one of the supporting characters in the historical drama Queen Seondeok, in a role that would soon change his life. It became one of the highest-rated TV series of that year (reaching a peak of over 40%), and Kim became a household name and the series' breakout star. For his portrayal of the playful but tragic Bidam, Kim said he was inspired by comic book characters such as Han Bi-kwang in Ruler of the Land, Miyamoto Musashi in Vagabond, and Kang Baek-ho in Slam Dunk. The writers rewrote the script to respond to Bidam's popularity with the viewing audience, giving the character more screen time and emphasizing his romance with the titular Seondeok (despite the incredible historical inaccuracy), until there were two main male leads in the series. A horse-riding-related injury on set, and a brief hospitalization due to H1N1 flu, were minor negatives compared to the impact the series had on Kim's career. He won several awards for his performance, gained more local and international fans, received advertisement offers, and was flooded with film and TV scripts.

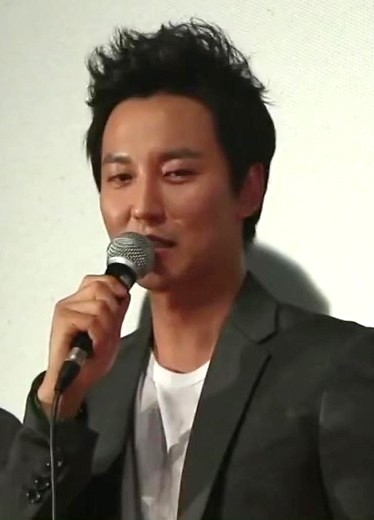
Kim in 2014

Another side benefit of Kim's popularity resulting from the Seondeok was the theatrical release in 2010 of his indie Lovers Vanished, a relationship drama which the director described as a "Korean Leaving Las Vegas." In 2010 he played an antihero lead role in Bad Guy, a dark melodrama about revenge, ambition, and fatal love. But while still in the middle of filming, Kim received his draft notice for mandatory military service. He tried to ask for deferment in order to wrap up the shoot for the series, but it was not granted. Kim shot as much as he could (his scenes were reduced, and a body double was also used) then entered the army two days later on July 15, 2010. He received four weeks of basic training at Nonsan, and served for two years as a public service worker.

Following his discharge from the army in 2012, Kim produced the film Ensemble, a music mockumentary about a group of classical musicians who form a group and take to the streets to perform outside their usual concert halls, showing their youthful passion in making music accessible. It premiered at the Jecheon International Music & Film Festival. He was also one of four celebrities in 2013 who directed a short film using smartphone Samsung Galaxy S4 with the theme "Meet a Life Companion"; his short Hello, Mom depicted the love between a mother and her daughter, and evoked the warm feeling of an analog film. This was followed by the 2014 period adventure film The Pirates, which reunited him with Shark costar Son Ye-jin. In 2013 Kim starred in the revenge TV series Shark (also known as Don't Look Back), from the makers of Resurrection and The Devil. He next starred opposite award-winning actress Jeon Do-yeon in the 2015 thriller The Shameless; Kim played a detective who falls for the girlfriend of the murderer he is investigating. The Shameless had its world premiere at 2015 Cannes Film Festival in the Un Certain Regard section. Nam Gil was next cast as powerful nobleman Heungseon Daewongun whose concubine takes up pansori in the period film The Sound of a Flower.

=== Critical and commercial success ===
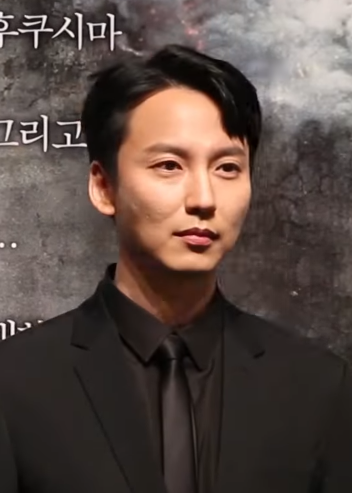
Kim in 2016

In 2016, Kim starred in disaster blockbuster Pandora portraying the aftermath of an explosion in a nuclear plant. Pandora premiered internationally at the International Film Festival and Awards Macao (IFFAM), receiving standing ovation. In 2017 Kim starred in the action thriller Memoir of a Murderer and romance drama film One Day. In 2019, Kim starred in the comedy film The Odd Family: Zombie On Sale. In 2020, Kim starred in the horror film The Closet.

In 2017, he starred in the time-slip medical drama Live Up to Your Name. In 2019 he headlined the comedy crime drama The Fiery Priest as a hot tempered priest. It was the first drama to air on Fridays and Saturdays on SBS and was well received by viewers, seeing a rapid rise in ratings and ending at a peak of 22%. Kim earned a Best Actor nomination at the 55th Baeksang Arts Awards, and went on to win eight awards for his performance including the Grand Prize (Daesang) at the 2019 SBS Drama Awards.

In 2022, Kim returned to the small screen with the SBS drama Through the Darkness as a criminal behavior analyst, which was his return to terrestrial television in three years, excluding Kim as a special appearance in the drama, SBS's One the Woman in which he appeared to support one of his previous co-star Lee Ha-nee.

In 2025, Kim starred in Netflix's action thriller television series Trigger wherein he portrayed Lee Do, a former military sniper turned police officer investigating the illegal firearms trade. In the same year, Kim starred in the neo-noir crime thriller film Nocturnal marking the second time he acted alongside Ha Jung-woo working with the 2020 film The Closet.

== Other ventures ==
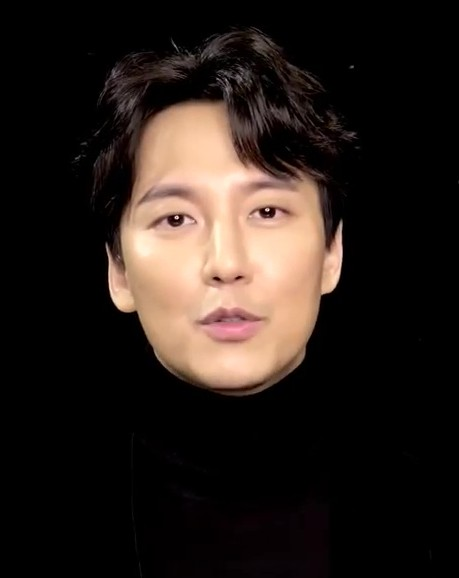
Kim in 2018

In 2012, Kim published a book titled Way Back to the Road, his memoir of the previous two years, which contained photos taken by himself. It also featured New Zealand scenery captured by photographer Cho Nam-ryong, and contributions from writer Lee Yoon-chul. In July 2013 he released his debut single in Japan. The title track is a cover of Kōji Tamaki's "Roman," and the single also included Kim's two songs from the Queen Seondeok soundtrack.

In 2022, Kim released CUP vol.1: How Personal Taste Inspires, an interview book collecting the stories of 10 creators about 'Inspiration', the source of creativity. In September 2022 he opened his personal Instagram account under username @namgildaero. In November 2022, the agency confirmed that bookings for the autograph donation show '2022 Kim Nam-gil's Universe's Strongest Show' was postponed from October 31 to November 8 due to the Seoul Halloween crowd crush.

=== Philanthropy ===
In January 2010, He went to Indonesia to do volunteer work at the recommendation of those around him. Kim was shocked by the lack of basic necessities he encountered during a relief trip with an MBC camera crew. He felt the camera's presence undermined his sincerity, and the PD advised him to use his popularity to draw more participation in the efforts. This experience led Kim to believe relief work should be more systematic, as short-term visits could leave people feeling empty or alone again. Kim discussed plans for "future work" that would not just provide immediate aid, but more importantly, instill in the people a belief that "they are not alone" - a fundamental approach he felt was more helpful than temporary relief.

In March 2012, Namgil Kim founded the cultural arts NGO Gilstory. It was officially established on April 8, 2013 and registered in Seoul in as a non-profit private organization with the goal of contributing to society through various cultural arts campaigns.

It was an organization he established after experiencing several overseas relief activities since 2010 and thinking about more sustainable social contribution activities. Gilstory has over 100 diverse experts including writers, painters, composers, photographers, IT experts, lawyers, accountants, and translators working pro bono (professionals in each field helping the socially disadvantaged).

In July 2024, Kim, has announced the launch of its 'Together' campaign to discover and support creators from aging out youth. (Note: Aging-out youth (aged-out orphan) is an orphan who reach the age of 18 years old and must leave the orphanage or foster care system to live independently.) The campaign aims to provide creative opportunities and artistic activity support to help these aging out youth achieve emotional independence, despite social and economic challenges. Gilstory is partnering with KB Kookmin Bank to sponsor creative funds and mentorship for talented young artists in the cultural arts field. Completed works will be publicly showcased, and the collaboration with the bank, which has consistently supported aging out youth, is especially meaningful in laying the groundwork for the economic independence of these young creators.

== Filmography ==
Key
†	Denotes films that have not yet been released

=== Film ===
Year	Title	Role	Notes	Ref.
2004	Low Life	Police officer at checkpoint		
2006	Don't Look Back	Seok-woo		
2006	No Regret	Song Jae-min		
2008	Public Enemy Returns	Park Mun-su		
2008	Modern Boy	Hidaka Shinsuke		
2008	Portrait of a Beauty	Kang-mu		
2009	Handphone	Jang Yoon-ho		
2010	Lovers Vanished	Im Su-in		
2012	Ensemble	—N/a	Producer	
2013	Hello, Mom	—N/a	Short film, Director	
2014	The Pirates	Jang Sa-jung		
2014	Glory for Everyone	narrator	Documentary	
2015	The Shameless	Jung Jae-gon		
2015	The Sound of a Flower	Heungseon Daewongun		
2016	Pandora	Kang Jae-hyeok		
2017	Memoir of a Murderer	Min Tae-joo		
2017	One Day	Lee Kang-soo		
2019	The Odd Family: Zombie On Sale	Park Min-gul		
2020	The Closet	Heo Kyung-hoon		
2020	Okay! Madam	NIS agent	Cameo	
2021	Emergency Declaration	Hyun-soo		
2022	Hunt	Tokyo branch agent 3	Cameo	
2023	A Man of Reason	Woo-jin		
2025	Nocturnal	Kang Ho-ryeong		
2026	Canvas of Blood †	Grand Prince Suyang		

=== Television series ===
Year	Title	Role	Notes	Ref.
1999	School 1	Min-soo		
2004	MBC Best Theater – "Kang Jang-soo's Love House"			
2004	Nonstop 4	Hyun-bin's friend		
2004	Sweet Buns	Hong Hye-jan's boyfriend		
2005	Be Strong, Geum-soon!	Noh Seong-hwan		
2005	5th Republic	Park Ji-man		
2005	My Lovely Sam Soon	Kim Byung-tae		
2006	Goodbye Solo	Yoo Ji-an		
2006	Lovers	Tae-San		
2007	When Spring Comes	Kim Joon-ki		
2007	Several Questions That Make Us Happy	Im Seok-joo		
2009	Queen Seondeok	Bidam		
2009	Tears of the Amazon	Narrator	Documentary	
2010	Haiti, Tears of Tragedy	Narrator	Documentary	
2010	Personal Taste	Man sitting in cafe	Cameo (episode 11)	
2010	Bad Guy	Shim Gun-wook		
2013	Don't Look Back: The Legend of Orpheus	Han Yi-soo		
2017	Live Up to Your Name	Heo Im / Heo Bong-tak		
2019	The Fiery Priest	Kim Hae-il		
2021	One the Woman	Male priest who leads to heaven	Cameo (episode 1)	
2022	Through the Darkness	Song Ha-young		
2022–2023	Island	Van	Part 1–2	
2023	Song of the Bandits	Lee Yoon		
2024	The Fiery Priest 2	Kim Hae-il		
2025	Karma	Yoon Jeong-min	Cameo (episode 6)	
2025	Trigger	Lee Do		
2026	Mad Concrete Dreams	Kim Kyun	Cameo (episode 1, 9)	

=== Television shows ===
Year	Title	Role	Notes	Ref.
2019	Trans-Siberian Pathfinders	Cast member		
2019	Life of Samantha	Narrator	Documentary	
2020	K-Ocean Pathfinders	Cast member		
2022	Living for an Empty House in a Fishing Village	Creator	Art Village project	
2023	Leave Anything	Cast Member	with Lee Sang-yoon	

=== Music video appearances ===
Year	Song title	Artist	Ref.
1999	"Gift" (선물)	Kim Jang-hoon	
2005	"Attention"	Lady	
2005	"Start"	M.Street	
2005	"Don't Forget, Don't Forget" (못잊어 못잊어)	The Red	
2007	"Just Ten Days" (열흘만)	J	

=== Hosting ===
Year	Title	Notes	Ref.
2018	23rd Busan International Film Festival	with Han Ji-min	
2022	31st Buil Film Awards	with Choi Soo-young	

== Theater ==
Year	Title	Role	Ref.
2000	A Midsummer Night's Dream		
2003	Park Mu-geun's Family		

== Discography ==
Album information	Track listing
Can't I Love You?: Track from Queen Seondeok Special OST; Released: January 8, 2010; Label: Star J Entertainment, Danal	Track listing: 1. 사랑하면 안 되니 ("Can't I Love You?"); 2. 사랑하면 안 되니 (Inst.)
You Don't Know: Track from Yawang OST, 2013); Released: January 14, 2013; Label: J & J Entertainment, Aijin Music, LOEN Entertainment	Track listing: 1. 너는 모른다 ("You Don't Know"); 2. 너는 모른다 (Inst.)
Roman: Single; Released: July 10, 2013; Label: Warner Music Japan	Track listing: 1. Roman; 2. 愛してはいけないの (Korean original ver.) ("Can't I Love You?"); 3. 지금 당신은 사랑하고 있습니까 (Korean original ver.) ("Do You Still Love Now"); 4. Roman (Inst.）; 5. 愛してはいけないの (Inst.)

== Photobook ==
Year	Title	Publisher	ISBN
2010	Into the Wild	The Book Company	ISBN 9788991317512
2012	Way Back to the Road	MCK Publishing	ISBN 9788996985402

== Ambassadorship ==
- Honorary Police Officers at the 75th Anniversary Ceremony of Forensic Investigation Day (2023)

== Accolades ==
=== Awards and nominations ===
Name of the award ceremony, year presented, category, nominee of the award, and the result of the nomination
Award ceremony	Year	Category	Nominee / Work	Result	Ref.
APAN Star Awards	2022	Top Excellence Award, Actor in a Miniseries	Through the Darkness	Nominated	
Asian Film Awards Special Awards	2014	Asian Rising Star	Kim Nam-gil	Won	
Baeksang Arts Awards	2010	Best New Actor – Television	Queen Seondeok	Won	
Baeksang Arts Awards	2016	Most Popular Actor (film)	Pandora	Nominated	
Baeksang Arts Awards	2019	Best Actor – Television	The Fiery Priest	Nominated	
Baeksang Arts Awards	2022	Best Actor – Television	Through the Darkness	Nominated	
Blue Dragon Film Awards	2008	Best New Actor	Public Enemy Returns	Nominated	
Blue Dragon Series Awards	2022	Best Leading Actor	Through the Darkness	Nominated	
Brand Customer Loyalty Awards	2023	Best Actor — OTT	Island	Won	
Brussels International Fantastic Film Festival	2021	Silver Raven Award	The Closet	Won	
Buil Film Awards	2015	Best Actor	The Shameless	Nominated	
Asia Contents Awards & Global OTT Awards	2019	Best Actor	The Fiery Priest	Won	
Grand Bell Awards	2009	Best Supporting Actor	Modern Boy	Nominated	
Grand Bell Awards	2009	Best New Actor	Modern Boy	Nominated	
Grimae Awards	2019	Best Actor	The Fiery Priest	Won	
KBS Drama Awards	2013	Top Excellence Award, Actor	Shark	Nominated	
KBS Drama Awards	2013	Excellence Award, Actor in a Mid-length Drama	Shark	Nominated	
Korean Broadcasters Association Awards	2019	Best Actor	The Fiery Priest	Won	
Korea Drama Awards	2022	Grand Prize (Daesang) (Note: A Daesang (Korean: 대상), which translates to "Grand Prize", is the highest honor given out at South Korean award ceremonies.)	Through the Darkness	Nominated	
Korean Culture and Entertainment Awards	2009	Best New Actor	Modern Boy	Won	
Korea PD Awards	2020	Performer Awards (Actor category)	The Fiery Priest	Won	
MBC Drama Awards	2009	Excellence Award, Actor	Queen Seondeok	Won	
MBC Drama Awards	2009	Best New Actor	Queen Seondeok	Nominated	
MBC Drama Awards	2009	Best Couple Award	Kim Nam-gil with Lee Yo-won; Queen Seondeok	Won	
SBS Drama Awards	2010	Top Excellence Award, Actor in a Drama Special	Bad Guy	Nominated	
SBS Drama Awards	2019	Grand Prize (Daesang)	The Fiery Priest	Won	
SBS Drama Awards	2019	Top Excellence Award in Mid-Length Drama (Actor)	The Fiery Priest	Nominated	
SBS Drama Awards	2019	Producer's Award	The Fiery Priest	Nominated	
SBS Drama Awards	2022	Grand Prize (Daesang)	Through the Darkness	Won	
SBS Drama Awards	2022	Director's Award	Through the Darkness	Nominated	
SBS Drama Awards	2022	Top Excellence Award, Actor in a Miniseries Genre/Fantasy Drama	Through the Darkness	Nominated	
SBS Drama Awards	2022	Best Supporting Team	Through the Darkness	Nominated	
SBS Drama Awards	2024	Grand Prize (Daesang)	The Fiery Priest 2	Nominated	
SBS Drama Awards	2024	Top Excellence Award, Actor in a Seasonal Drama	The Fiery Priest 2	Won	
Seoul International Drama Awards	2019	Outstanding Korean Actor	The Fiery Priest	Won	
Seoul International Drama Awards	2022	Best Actor	Through the Darkness	Nominated	
Style Icon Awards	2009	New TV Icon	Kim Nam-gil	Won	

=== State honors ===
Name of country, year given, and name of honor
Country or Organization	Year	Honor or Award	Ref.
South Korea (Note: Honors are given at the Korean Popular Culture and Arts Awards, arranged by the Korea Creative Content Agency and hosted by the Ministry of Culture, Sports and Tourism. They are awarded to those who have contributed to the arts and South Korea's pop culture.)	2019	Prime Minister's Commendation	

=== Listicles ===
Name of publisher, year listed, name of listicle, and placement
Publisher	Year	Listicle	Placement	Ref.
Forbes Korea	2020	Korea Power Celebrity 40	17th	
Korean Film Council	2021	Korean Actors 200 (Note: Introduces 200 actors that best represent the present and future of Korean cinema to the people in the film industry all over the world.)	Included	
The Screen	2019	2009–2019 Top Box Office Powerhouse Actors in Korean Movies	45th	
