= Lovers Vanished =

- Hangul: 폭풍전야
- Hanja: 暴風전야
- RR: Pokpungjeonya
- MR: P'okp'ungjŏnya
- Directed by: Cho Chang-ho
- Written by: Cho Chang-ho
- Produced by: Lee Tae-hun
- Starring: Kim Nam-gil; Hwang Woo-seul-hye
- Cinematography: Kim Yong-chul; Hong Seong-jin
- Edited by: Kim Hyung-joo
- Music by: Park Ji
- Distributed by: Opus Pictures
- Release date: April 1, 2010
- Running time: 104 minutes
- Country: South Korea
- Language: Korean
- Box office: US$348,797

Lovers Vanished (Korean: 폭풍전야; RR: Pokpungjeonya; lit. 'Before the Storm') is a 2010 South Korean film, directed by Cho Chang-ho as both a love story and a character drama. It stars Kim Nam-gil and Hwang Woo-seul-hye as two people who find love at the edge of life.

== Plot ==
Su-in, an ex master chef, gets falsely accused of murdering his wife and is sentenced to life in prison. After several failed attempts to escape and prove his innocence, he hears that prisoners with AIDS can be freed on compassionate grounds. Su-in approaches Sang-byung, an HIV positive inmate, and deliberately injects Sang-byung's blood into his body, only to discover too late that the rumor is untrue and merely results in his being transferred to the prison hospital. Sang-byung helps the desperate Su-in to escape on condition he pays a visit to a certain remote café by the coast in Jeju Island. Su-in succeeds in escaping and confronts his wife's lover and real murderer, who's since become a priest. But after confessing to the crime, the priest commits suicide by jumping over a cliff. With no hope of clearing his name and nowhere to turn, Su-in goes to café Luth, run by Mia, a beautiful magician with a painful past of her own. Mia ends up hiring Su-in as a chef, and the two slowly grow closer, knowing that their time together is limited.

== Cast ==
- Kim Nam-gil as Kim Su-in
- Hwang Woo-seul-hye as Yeo Mia
- Jung Yoon-min as Sang-byung
- Nam Sung-jin as Ki-yeon
- Kim Jeong-min as Min-jung
- Kim Jae-rok as priest
- Yoon Je-moon as Jo, the shopkeeper
- Oh Hye-seok as Jin-ho
- Baek Jung-hee as grandmother
- Jeon Jin-gi as detective
- Han Cheol-woo as detective
- Noh Tae-hyeon as Dong-yeol
- Moon Jeong-woong as hospital police officer

== Release ==
Filming took place in March to June 2009. Lovers Vanished initially found difficulty gaining a theatrical release, but with the popularity of actor Kim Nam-gil's 2009 television series Queen Seondeok, the film secured an April 1, 2010 release date.
