= Utawarerumono =

2002 visual novel and its franchise

- Cover of the Utawarerumono Windows game

うたわれるもの
- Genre: Adventure, Fantasy
- Video game
- Developer: Leaf (Windows); Sting (PS2/PSP/PS4/PSV)
- Publisher: JP: Aquaplus; WW: NIS America (PS4/PSV); WW: Shiravune (Windows)
- Directed by: Tsutomu Washimi; Tatsuki Amaduyu (PS4/PSV)
- Produced by: Naoya Shimokawa
- Music by: Junya Matsuoka; Shinya Ishikawa; Takahiro Yonemura
- Genre: Tactical role-playing game Visual novel Eroge (Windows)
- Platform: Windows, PS2, PSP, PS4, PSV
- Released: April 26, 2002: Windows; JP: April 26, 2002; WW: January 22, 2021 (Note: Port of the PS4/PSV remake.) PS2; JP: October 26, 2006 PSP; JP: May 28, 2009 PS4, PSV; JP: April 26, 2018; NA: May 26, 2020; EU: May 29, 2020
Further information
Manga
Written by	Aquaplus
Illustrated by	Arō Shimakusa
Published by	MediaWorks
Imprint	Dengeki Comics
Magazine	Dengeki G's Magazine
Original run	September 30, 2005 – November 30, 2006
Volumes	2
Anime television series
Directed by	Tomoki Kobayashi
Written by	Makoto Uezu
Music by	Hijiri Anze; Miyu Nakamura
Studio	OLM
Licensed by	NA: Crunchyroll LLC (Note: Formerly licensed by ADV Films. In 2008, this series was among the 30 titles transferred to Funimation Entertainment.)
Original network	Chiba TV, ABC, TV Aichi, TV Saitama, tvk, AT-X, Tokyo MX
English network	US: Anime Network
Original run	April 3, 2006 – September 25, 2006
Episodes	26
Manga
Utawarerumono Chiriyuku Mono e no Komoriuta
Written by	Aquaplus
Illustrated by	Minakuchi Takashi
Published by	ASCII Media Works
Imprint	Dengeki Comics
Magazine	Dengeki Maoh
Original run	December 2007 – October 2010
Volumes	3
Original video animation
Directed by	Kenichiro Katsura
Written by	Takamitsu Kōno
Studio	Aquaplus (Production); Chaos Project (Animation)
Licensed by	NA: Sentai Filmworks
Released	June 5, 2009 – June 23, 2010
Runtime	30 minutes each
Episodes	3
Video game
Utawarerumono: Mask of Deception
Developer	Aquaplus; Sting
Publisher	JP: Aquaplus; NA: Atlus USA; EU: Deep Silver; WW: Shiravune (Windows)
Directed by	Tatsuki Amaduyu
Produced by	Naoya Shimokawa
Music by	Michio Kinugasa; Junya Matsuoka; Shigeki Hayashi
Genre	Tactical role-playing game Visual novel
Platform	PlayStation 3 PlayStation 4 PlayStation Vita; Microsoft Windows
Released	PS3, PS4, PSV: JP: September 24, 2015; WW: May 23, 2017; Windows: WW: January 23, 2020
Anime television series
Utawarerumono: The False Faces
Directed by	Keitaro Motonaga
Written by	Takamitsu Kōno
Music by	Naoya Shimokawa; Michio Kinugasa; Junya Matsuoka; Shigeki Hayashi
Studio	White Fox
Licensed by	NA: Sentai Filmworks
Original network	Tokyo MX, TV Aichi, MBS, AT-X, BS11
Original run	October 3, 2015 – March 26, 2016
Episodes	25
Video game
Utawarerumono: Mask of Truth
Developer	Aquaplus; Sting
Publisher	JP: Aquaplus; NA: Atlus USA; EU: Deep Silver; WW: Shiravune (Windows)
Directed by	Tatsuki Amaduyu
Produced by	Naoya Shimokawa
Music by	Michio Kinugasa; Junya Matsuoka; Shinya Ishikawa
Genre	Tactical role-playing game Visual novel
Platform	PlayStation 3 PlayStation 4 PlayStation Vita; Microsoft Windows
Released	PS3, PS4, PSV: JP: September 21, 2016; WW: September 5, 2017; Windows: WW: January 23, 2020
Original video animation
Utawarerumono: Tuskur-kōjo no Karei Naru Hibi
Studio	White Fox
Released	April 26, 2018
Runtime	13 minutes
Video game
Utawarerumono: Zan
Developer	Tamsoft
Publisher	JP: Aquaplus; WW: NIS America (PS4); WW: Shiravune (Windows)
Genre	Hack and slash Role-playing game
Platform	PlayStation 4 Microsoft Windows
Released	PS4: JP: September 27, 2018; NA: September 10, 2019; EU: September 13, 2019; Windows: WW: December 16, 2025
Video game
Utawarerumono: Lost Flag
Developer	Tose
Publisher	Aquaplus
Genre	Role-playing game
Platform	iOS, Android
Released	JP: November 26, 2019
Video game
Utawarerumono: Zan 2
Developer	Tamsoft
Publisher	JP: Aquaplus; WW: Shiravune
Genre	Hack and slash Role-playing game
Platform	PlayStation 4 PlayStation 5 Microsoft Windows
Released	PS4, PS5: JP: July 22, 2021; Windows: WW: February 25, 2026
Anime television series
Utawarerumono: Mask of Truth
Directed by	Kenichi Kawamura
Written by	Itsuki Yokoyama
Music by	Aquaplus
Studio	White Fox
Licensed by	Crunchyroll
Original network	Tokyo MX, BS11, HTB, AT-X
Original run	July 3, 2022 – December 25, 2022
Episodes	28
Video game
Monochrome Mobius: Rights and Wrongs Forgotten
Developer	Aquaplus
Publisher	JP: Aquaplus; WW: Shiravune
Produced by	Naoya Shimokawa
Genre	Role-playing game
Platform	PlayStation 4 PlayStation 5 Microsoft Windows
Released	PS4, PS5: JP: November 17, 2022; NA: September 5, 2023; EU/AU: September 8, 2023; Windows: WW: November 17, 2022
Video game
Utawarerumono: Past and Present Rediscovered
Developer	Aquaplus
Publisher	JP: Aquaplus; WW: Shiravune
Produced by	Naoya Shimokawa
Genre	Role-playing game
Platform	Nintendo Switch 2 PlayStation 5 Microsoft Windows
Released	Switch 2, PS5: JP: May 2026; Windows: WW: May 2026
- icon

Utawarerumono (Note: Utawarerumono (Japanese: うたわれるもの)) is a Japanese tactical role-playing visual novel developed by Leaf, which released in April 2002 for Microsoft Windows as an adult game. It was later ported to the PlayStation 2, PlayStation Portable, PlayStation 4 and PlayStation Vita with the adult content removed. In releases subsequent to the initial 2002 version, it is known by its more specific title Utawarerumono: Prelude to the Fallen. (Note: Utawarerumono: Prelude to the Fallen (うたわれるもの 散りゆく者への子守唄, Utawarerumono: Chiriyuku Mono e no Komoriuta))

The game was highly successful in Japan and has since been adapted into a wide variety of other media, including several anime series, drama CDs, and Internet radio programs, and manga.

A sequel for the PlayStation 3, PlayStation 4 and PlayStation Vita titled Utawarerumono: Mask of Deception was released in Japan in September 2015, and worldwide in May 2017. The final chapter of the trilogy, titled Utawarerumono: Mask of Truth, was released in Japan in September 2016, and worldwide a year later. These second and third games were ported to Microsoft Windows in January 2020, and a PC port of the remake of the first followed in January 2021.

A spin-off hack and slash game developed by Tamsoft titled Utawarerumono: Zan, based on the events from Mask of Deception, was released in Japan in September 2018 for the PlayStation 4, and worldwide in September 2019. A sequel titled Utawarerumono: Zan 2 covering the events from Mask of Truth was released in Japan in July 2021 for the PlayStation 4 and PlayStation 5. Zan and Zan 2 were released worldwide on Windows in December 2025 and February 2026, respectively. A free-to-play mobile game developed by Tose, titled Utawarerumono: Lost Flag, was released in November 2019 in Japan for iOS and Android, incorporating elements from throughout the franchise. A new game commemorating the 20th anniversary of the series titled Monochrome Mobius: Rights and Wrongs Forgotten was released in Japan for PlayStation 4 and PlayStation 5, and worldwide for Microsoft Windows on November 17, 2022. A fifth and final game, Utawarerumono: Past and Present Rediscovered, was released in Japan on Nintendo Switch 2 and PlayStation 5 and worldwide on Windows in May 2026.

== Gameplay ==
Standard visual novel gameplay in Utawarerumono, depicting the main character Hakuowlo conversing with Eruruu

Much of Utawarerumono's gameplay is spent simply reading the text that appears on the game screen, which represents either dialogue or narration from the protagonist's point of view. At times, the player will come to a "decision point" and may choose from a single or multiple options. Unlike many other visual novels, these choices do not affect the outcome of the story, but influence the order in which scenes play out.

Utawarerumono also features a turn-based tactical role-playing battle system that centers on the player moving characters through a square-based grid to achieve objectives, which consist of either defeating a set number of enemies or moving one or all characters to a specific location. During each character's turn, the player may choose to have the character move, attack, or cast magic, of which only moving and attacking can be performed in succession, in that order. When a character attacks an enemy character, the player is given a chance to add additional attacks by clicking in the brief interval before a yellow circle on screen disappears. The number of attacks that the player can add to a character's attack is based on that character's current "technique" skill, and the maximum varies based on the character. After adding a certain number of attacks, the character will perform a special finishing attack should they have the required abilities. As characters defeat enemies and participate in battle, they gain battle points which are used to increase their abilities.

At the start of the game, the player is given a choice of four difficulty levels, which affects the difficulty of the battles. After completing the game once, the player is given two even more challenging difficulty levels to choose from and may choose to skip the dialogue.

== Plot ==
Utawarerumono is a story centering around the masked protagonist, Hakuowlo, who one day is found by a family of two girls and their grandmother in a nearby forest close to their village. He is badly injured and is soon found to have amnesia, so they take him to their home and treat him until he is well again. Hakuowlo is soon accepted into their village where he stays and lives with them, but before long Hakuowlo finds that life in this village is being oppressed by the greedy ruler of the land their village resides in. When these actions escalate into disaster, Hakuowlo leads a rebellion that culminates in his assumption of the throne of a new country, born from the ashes of the old, and named Tuskur after the grandmother of the two girls who helped save his life.

After taking and consolidating power, Hakuowlo soon learns that peace is difficult to maintain, and finds himself fighting a series of bloody battles to protect the peace of his country and his people. Along the way, Hakuowlo meets strong warriors from other countries and tribes and welcomes them into his growing family. The passage of time brings both laughter and hardship, but with Hakuowlo leading the way, all others are confident in their future.

The story's genre is at first a fantasy-style story with heavy Ainu influence, but later develops science-fiction themes. While it initially appears to take place in a fantasy world full of magical beings and new species of humans, it is later revealed that it takes place in Earth's distant future.

== Characters ==
Utawarerumono features a broad cast of characters from various backgrounds. The main characters are all connected to the male protagonist, Hakuowlo, a man found injured in a forest who wears an irremovable mask and has lost his memories. He is a charismatic man who has the power to rally people around him when it comes time to fight. After earning respect commanding a rebellion, Hakuowlo comes to rule the newly founded nation of Tuskur—named after the grandmother of Eruruu, the woman who initially found him. Eruruu is an apothecary-in-training who often helps Hakuowlo in much the same way a secretary or even a mother would. She has a forceful but caring personality, especially around her younger sister Aruruu, for whom she cares deeply. Aruruu is a playful young girl who is shy and quiet, usually only saying a word or two when spoken to. After the god of the forest, Mutikapa, is killed, Aruruu raises the tiger-beast's child as if it were her own, naming it Mukkuru, and the cub comes to regard her family as its own.

After Tuskur is founded, more warriors assemble under Hakuowlo's banner. The first is an impulsive and zealous dual-sword–wielding former bandit named Oboro. Dorry and Guraa are his two twin archer servants. Oboro has a younger sister, named Yuzuha, who has been sick with an unknown illness since birth and is usually bedridden because of it. The next man to join Hakuowlo is Benawi, a strong warrior who possesses a calm and logical personality—although he often gets irritated when Hakuowlo neglects his administrative duties. Benawi's right-hand man is Kurou, whose strength is comparable to Oboro's. There are several strong women who fight for Hakuowlo as well. Ulthury of the winged Onkamiyamukai tribe comes to Tuskur as a priestess sent to look out for the country's welfare. She and her younger sister Camyu, who comes to Tuskur as a stowaway with Ulthury's party, have powerful magic abilities extraordinary even among their own mystical people. Karulau, an enslaved warrior, is found after a shipwreck having slaughtered the soldiers who were holding her prisoner. Hakuowlo shows leniency, and she joins his cause, but keeps the great shackle around her neck as a memento. Karulau carries a ridiculously heavy custom-made black blade that only she can wield and has an affinity towards sake. Touka, of the noble-hearted Evenkuruga tribe, was first deceived into opposing Hakuowlo but joins him after the deception is revealed and her previous lord Orikakan is murdered by the ambitious conqueror Niwe. Touka is very protective of Hakuowlo, acting as his bodyguard. Her serious personality frequently leads her to regret her own natural clumsiness, though sometimes she is shown to have a softer side as well.

== Development ==
Washimi Tsutomu directed the Utawarerumono Windows game, Naoya Shimokawa was the producer, and Suga Munemitsu planned the scenario. Ama Tsuyuki provided the original character designs, and Matsuoka Junya, Takahiro Yonemura, and Shinya Ishikawa handled the music. Neko Iwashiro, Yokoo Kenichi, and Okawa Masato programmed the game. Lastly, AIC managed the production of the opening animation. Flight Plan helped in the development for the PlayStation 2 version.

The Utawarerumono series began as a Japanese video game for Windows on April 26, 2002, by Leaf and Aquaplus. A DVD-ROM edition was later released on December 12, 2003. The story was linear and contained no voice acting, and the original version of the game was never released outside Japan, although a fan translation patch for it exists. A PlayStation 2 port, titled Utawarerumono: Prelude to the Fallen (うたわれるもの 散りゆく者への子守唄, Utawarerumono: Chiriyuku Mono e no Komoriuta) and featuring a new battle system by Flight Plan (of the Summon Night series), was developed by Sting and released on October 26, 2006, in Japan. This port introduced full voice acting and several other enhancements, including a new story arc, while adult graphics and scenes present in the original PC release were removed, and the game was rated for ages 15 and up. A PlayStation Portable version of the game, Utawarerumono Portable, was released on May 28, 2009. A remake for the PlayStation 4 and PlayStation Vita, also titled Utawarerumono: Prelude to the Fallen, was released on April 26, 2018, in Japan, and in May 2020 in the west by NIS America, with a Windows port published by Shiravune releasing on January 22, 2021.

== Adaptations ==
Utawarerumono manga volume 1 cover

=== Manga ===
The first Utawarerumono manga series, illustrated by Arō Shimakusa, was serialized in the bishōjo magazine Dengeki G's Magazine between September 30, 2005, and November 30, 2006. Two bound volumes were released by ASCII Media Works under their Dengeki Comics imprint compiling the entire manga story. A second manga series illustrated by Minakuchi Takashi, titled Utawarerumono Chiriyuku Mono e no Komoriuta, was serialized in ASCII Media Works' Dengeki Maoh magazine between the December 2007 and October 2010 issues. Three tankōbon volumes were released between January 27, 2009, and November 27, 2010, under their Dengeki Comics imprint. A one-shot manga illustrated by Arō was published in ASCII Media Works' Dengeki G's Festival! Comic magazine in the June 2008 issue.

DNA Media Comics has published two Comic anthology series for Utawarerumono. The first anthology series, with the general title Utawarerumono Comic Anthology, consisted of three volumes (including a special edition) released between August 2002 and November 2006. A seven-volume anthology series, titled Utawarerumono Chiriyuku Mono e no Komoriuta Comic Anthology, was also published by DNA Media Comics between January and September, 2007; it was illustrated by various artists. Ohzora Shuppan has published a five-volume comic anthology series, titled Utawarerurmono Anthology Comics and released between August 2002 and March 2003 under their Twin Heart Comics imprint. Another anthology series, titled Game Comics Utawarerumono, was published by La Porte in two volumes between August and October 2002.

No.	Title	Release date	ISBN
1	Utawarerumono 01 (うたわれるもの 01)	July 27, 2006	4-8402-3534-1
2	Utawarerumono 02 (うたわれるもの 02)	January 27, 2007	978-4-8402-3746-8

No.	Title	Release date	ISBN
1	Utawarerumono Chiriyuku Mono e no Komoriuta 01 (うたわれるもの 散りゆく者への子守唄 01)	January 27, 2009	978-4-04-867552-9
2	Utawarerumono Chiriyuku Mono e no Komoriuta 02 (うたわれるもの 散りゆく者への子守唄 02)	June 26, 2009	978-4-04-868063-9
3	Utawarerumono Chiriyuku Mono e no Komoriuta 03 (うたわれるもの 散りゆく者への子守唄 03)	November 27, 2010	978-4-04-868981-6

=== Anime ===
The Utawarerumono anime aired in Japan between April 3 and September 25, 2006, and has 26 episodes. With the first DVD release of the anime on August 23, 2006, a short omake episode lasting about seven minutes was also included. Two pieces of theme music are used for the anime series: one opening theme and two ending themes. The opening theme is "Musōka" by Suara, the first ending theme used for the first twenty-five episodes is "Madoromi no Rinne" by Eri Kawai, and the second ending theme used for the final episode is "Kimi ga Tame" by Suara. The North American rights to the Utawarerumono anime were initially held by ADV Films for $109,201 effective August 1, 2006, who completed a full DVD release of the entire series. In July 2008, Funimation, now currently known as Crunchyroll LLC, announced that the license to Utawarerumono (and other titles formerly held by ADV) had transferred to them.

A three-episode Utawarerumono original video animation series was developed by the creators of the anime. These episodes focus on side stories from the game which were not covered in the TV series. The first OVA was released on June 5, 2009. The OVA's opening theme is "Adamant Faith" by Suara and its ending theme is "Yume no Tsuzuki" by Rena Uehara. In the first OVA, the episode focuses mainly on Ulthury's relationship with the child rescued from Niwe's attack, and how she refuses to give up the child to another family, going so far as to attack her friends. The second OVA was released on December 23, 2009. The third OVA was released on June 23, 2010.

The anime adaptation of Utawarerumono: The False Faces was announced on June 7, 2015. It is produced by White Fox and directed by Keitaro Motonaga, with Takamitsu Kōno supervising the series' scripts, Masahiko Nakata adapting the original character designs, and Naoya Shimokawa and Aquaplus composing the music. The series aired from October 3, 2015, to March 26, 2016, and it is streamed on Crunchyroll. (Note: Then owned by The Chernin Group and AT&T through Otter Media.) Suara performed the two opening theme songs "Fuantei na Kamisama" and "Ten Kakeru Hoshi," as well as the two ending theme songs "Yumekaotsutsuka" and "Hoshi Kudaru Sora Aogimite." After the acquisition of Crunchyroll by Sony Pictures Television, the parent company of Funimation in 2021, Utawarerumono: The False Faces, among several Sentai titles, was dropped from the Crunchyroll streaming service on March 31, 2022.

On April 26, 2018, an original anime titled Utawarerumono: Tuskur-kōjo no Karei Naru Hibi was released with the premium collection PS4/Vita remake of Utawarerumono: Prelude to the Fallen. White Fox returned to produce the anime.

On October 19, 2019, an anime adaptation of Utawarerumono: Mask of Truth was announced. In November 2021, it was revealed to be a television series adaptation produced by White Fox, with Kenichi Kawamura directing, Itsuki Yokoyama writing the series' scripts, Masahiko Nakata designing the characters and serving as chief animation director, and Aquaplus composing the music. The 28-episode series aired from July 3 to December 25, 2022, on Tokyo MX and BS11, with the first two episodes premiering back-to-back. (Note: Tokyo MX lists the series premiere at 25:00 on July 2, 2022, which is effectively 1:00 a.m. JST on July 3.) The opening theme song is "Hito Nanda", and the ending theme song is "Hyakunichisō", both performed by Suara. Crunchyroll has licensed the series in the English-speaking regions.

=== Drama CDs and radios shows ===
Four drama CDs based on the anime were published by Lantis and distributed from King Records. The first drama CD was released on July 26, 2006, the second was released on December 6, 2006, the third was released on February 21, 2007, and the fourth was released as an extra edition on May 23, 2007.

The first Internet radio show, called Utawarerumono Radio, was aired on Oto Izumi broadcast station from July 7, 2006, to July 2, 2007. A total of 51 broadcasts were made, with the addition of an extra edition. It was available on the net station Radio Kansai every Friday, and aired from October 6, 2006, to March 30, 2007. Hidaka Shigeki directed the radio show. Imagica Imageworks published the radio CDs for Utawarerumono Radio. Another internet radio show called Web Rajio Eruru no ko Heya IN Utawarerumono, was also aired on Oto Izumi broadcast station from April 16, 2009, to June 17, 2010. It would air every other Thursday. The radio show was also directed by Hidaka Shigeki. The Web Radio Eruru no Kobeya in Utawarerumono radio CDs were published by Frontier Works.

=== Other media ===
On March 28, 2004, an isometric scrolling fighting game for Windows, based on the Utawarerumono characters and storyline, was released by Leaf. A downloadable patch available on the official website adds additional characters to the game. Characters from Utawarerumono are also playable in Aquapazza: Aquaplus Dream Match, a fighting game developed by Aquaplus featuring characters from various Leaf games.

== Reception ==
Across the semi-monthly chart of top 50 best-selling bishōjo games sold nationally in Japan, the Windows version of Utawarerumono ranked first in the last two weeks of April 2004. It ranked second in the first two weeks and 27th in the last two weeks of May. It then ranked 16th and 29th in June before dropping out of the chart. The PlayStation version of the game sold over 82,000 units in four days. In an August 2007 survey conducted by Dengeki G's Magazine, Utawarerumono was voted the 15th most interesting bishōjo game by readers, tying with Kimi ga Nozomu Eien.

On Mania.com, the six volumes of the DVD set for the anime adaptation of Utawarerumono were reviewed and rated by Chris Beveridge. He gave volume one a 'B+' rating, and praised the anime saying, "Over the course of the five episodes, the series drew me in more and more until I became completely engaged in it and wished I had not only the next volume but all of the volumes on hand. These episodes turn into "page turners" pretty quickly and do a very solid and entertaining job as the first chapter of a larger story." He also gave volumes two and three a 'B+' rating, volume four an 'A−' rating, and volume five and six an 'A' rating. The anime received a mostly positive review from Stig Hogset of THEM Anime Reviews, saying, "A rather great fantasy piece. I can't really see it disappointing anyone." He gave Utawarerumono a four out of five star rating.

The tactical role-playing visual novel sequel, Utawarerumono: Mask of Deception, shipped over 100,000 copies on September 24, 2015, and sold 55,580 physical retail copies within its first week of release in Japan across PS3, PS4 and PS Vita platforms. Famitsu gave the game a review score of 32/40.

In the West, the PC releases of the sequel titles Utawarerumono: Mask of Deception and Utawarerumono: Mask of Truth were among the best-selling new releases on Steam in January 2020.
