= Take Point =

2018 South Korean action film by Kim Byung-woo

- Theatrical release poster
- Hangul: PMC: 더 벙커
- Lit.: PMC: The Bunker
- RR: PMC: deo beongkeo
- MR: PMC: tŏ pŏngk'ŏ
- Directed by: Kim Byung-woo
- Written by: Kim Byung-woo
- Produced by: Kang Myung-chan; Kim Young-hoon; Ha Jung-woo
- Starring: Ha Jung-woo; Lee Sun-kyun
- Cinematography: Kim Byung-seo
- Edited by: Kim Chang-ju
- Music by: Lee Ju-noh
- Production company: Perfect Storm Film
- Distributed by: CJ Entertainment
- Release date: December 26, 2018
- Running time: 124 minutes
- Country: South Korea
- Languages: English; Korean
- Box office: US$12.9 million

Take Point (Korean: PMC: 더 벙; lit. 'PMC: The Bunker') is a 2018 South Korean action film written and directed by Kim Byung-woo, starring Ha Jung-woo and Lee Sun-kyun. Featuring dialogue in English and Korean languages, the film was released on December 26, 2018.

== Plot ==
Fearing a third world war situation, CIA agent "Mac" Mackenzie recruits Ahab, the captain of an elite mercenary company named Black Lizard to infiltrate a secret underground bunker located 30 meters below the Korean DMZ and take out a target. However, it is soon revealed the target is King, the Supreme Leader of North Korea. Along with his team, Ahab attacks the forces surrounding King and takes everyone hostage. However, as they're about to leave after killing the hostages, one of Ahab's men, José is fatally shot and despite Logan's requests to wait and request for a medevac, Ahab is ordered to move. Arriving at his room, Ahab finds himself taken hostage by a teammate who offers him a better deal after shooting both Logan and King. However, after a brief firefight, Logan regains consciousness and kills him. Ahab then proceeds to the bathroom where he thinks King to be dead. He manages to set up the whole contact system there. Mac makes it clear that everyone dies if King does the same. However, Ahab is found to be crippled with an artificial right leg. Its being broken limits him from movement, and he orders his men to search for the doctor who came along with King. Using a motion camera, he manages to locate Dr. Yoon Ji-eui and his fellow members. His men save them from being attacked, while Yoon instructs Ahab to bring back King's heartbeat back. He tells him to transfer O+ blood into King's body, but finds the blood pouch useless. He then calls a wounded Logan to the bathroom and after injecting him, starts transferring blood from his body to that of the King despite Logan's constant requests to not do so. Soon, the bunker is bombed, leaving Ahab and Yoon trapped, Logan dead and Ahab's army fighting the rivals.

Ahab and Yoon manage to contact each other and the latter helps him with extracting a bullet from his thigh. However, Ahab ends up tearing an artery, following which he tapes up his wound and instructs Yoon to find the blood pouches. In the meanwhile, Ahab finds network on his phone and receives a call from Mac. He asks for backup but is shocked to learn that she's been stripped off her charges and a second bombing has been ordered. He's told that while he and King would be rescued with President McGregor's support, his team and the North Korean doctor would be eliminated. Ahab leads Yoon to the room where he finds blood pouches but is stopped by an agent who's attacked by the former. With his team slowly dying, Ahab and Yoon remain the only survivors being hunted for. They manage to meet at the bathroom where Yoon transfers his own blood to King's body upon finding the blood pouches destroyed. Another gunfight ensues when the rivals enter the bathroom but are then shot by the backup team sent by Mac. President McGregor declares Ahab as a hero who fought to rescue King from the enemies, and eventually wins public support. Ahab, King and Yoon are rescued and taken in a plane which is soon attacked. An unconscious Yoon falls out of the plane and Ahab jumps with a parachute, first saving King and then Yoon by holding him tight as they swiftly reach the surface. Both Ahab and Yoon survive, and the latter gives him a shoulder as they begin walking.

== Cast ==
- Ha Jung-woo as Ahab
- Lee Sun-kyun as Dr. Yoon Ji-eui
- Jennifer Ehle as Agent Mackenzie
- Kevin Durand as Markus
- Malik Yoba as Gerald
- Spencer Daniels as Logan
- Robert Curtis Brown as President McGregor
- Jeff Bosley as Dimitri
- Jorge-Luis Pallo as Pedro
- Dean Dawson as Strategic security analyst
- Markina Brown as CNBC anchor
- Kaden Vu as Bao
- Ines Laimins as Secretary of State
- Andreas Fronk as Alligator 47 captain
- Liviu Covalschi as Carlos
- Paul Meixner as Marcel
- Julián Juaquín as Jose
- Jack Lyons as Nelson
- Warzecha Wyka as JP
- Yaqub Khurram as Samir
- István Medvigy as CIA agent Charles
- Barri Tsavaris as CIA agent Diane
- Sun Wook-Hyun as King
- Shin Hyun-bin as Lee Ji-soo (special appearance)

== Production ==
Principal photography began on August 4, 2017, and wrapped on December 1, 2017.
