= The People Upstairs (2025 film) =

2025 film by Ha Jung-woo

- Theatrical release poster
- Hangul: 윗집 사람들
- RR: Witjip saramdeul
- MR: Witchip saramdŭl
- Directed by: Ha Jung-woo
- Screenplay by: Ha Jung-woo; Lee Cha-yeon; Seon Seung-yeon
- Based on: The People Upstairs by Cesc Gay
- Produced by: Lee Han-dae; Kim Young-hoon
- Starring: Ha Jung-woo; Gong Hyo-jin; Kim Dong-wook; Lee Hanee
- Cinematography: So Jeong-o
- Edited by: Kim Sang-bum; Kim Ho-bin
- Music by: Dalpalan
- Production companies: Walkhouse Company; Sidus Pictures
- Distributed by: By4M Studio
- Release dates: September 18, 2025 (BIFF); December 3, 2025 (South Korea)
- Running time: 107 minutes
- Country: South Korea
- Language: Korean
- Box office: US$3.6 million

The People Upstairs (Korean: 윗집 사람들) is a 2025 South Korean comedy-drama film directed by Ha Jung-woo, starring Ha with Gong Hyo-jin, Kim Dong-wook, and Lee Hanee. The film follows two married couples who meet due to noise complaints between apartments and the confusion that ensues as they have dinner together. The film is an adaptation of Cesc Gay's 2020 film of the same name, which itself was based on his play Los vecinos de arriba. It had its world premiere at the 30th Busan International Film Festival on September 18, 2025, and was released on December 3, 2025 in South Korea.

== Premise ==
The story depicts the events that unfold as the couple living downstairs, Jeong-ah and Hyun-soo, are disturbed by the noisy life of the couple living upstairs, Mr. Kim and Soo-kyung, and secrets begin to unravel when they end up having dinner together.

== Cast ==
- Ha Jung-woo as Mr. Kim
- Gong Hyo-jin as Jeong-ah
- Kim Dong-wook as Hyun-soo
- Lee Hanee as Soo-kyung
- Ahn So-hee as Son Hyun-joo
- Hyun Bong-sik as Ho-chan
- Ji Ye-eun and Cha Tae-hyun as 6th floor couple
- Oh Dal-su as man next door

== Production ==
On December 12, 2024 it was confirmed that Ha Jung-woo and Lee Hanee would be the lead couple of the film. Gong Hyo-jin and Kim Dong-wook also joined the cast as the other couple.

Principal photography began on January 7, 2025. and ended on February 8, 2025.

== Release ==
The People Upstairs had its world premiere in the 'Korean Cinema Today - Special Premiere' section at the 30th Busan International Film Festival on September 18, 2025.

It will have its International Premiere in Special Gala of the 10th London East Asian Film Festival on October 24, 2025. It is also selected in the Competition strand along with other seven films.

On September 8, releasing poster and trailer the release date of the film was announced as December 3, 2025 in South Korea.

== Reception ==
=== Box office ===
The film was released on December 3, 2025 on 752 screens. It opened at the 3rd place, recording 25,425 viewers on its opening day at the Korean box office.

As of December 31, 2025, the film has grossed US$3,650,704 from 546,433 admissions.

=== Critical response ===
James Marsh of South China Morning Post at the Busan International Film Festival rated the film with 3 stars and praised the film as a "cheeky comedy of manners" that unfolds entirely within a single apartment, giving it the feel of a stage play. He commended director Ha Jung-woo for maintaining a "breezy pace and lighthearted tone," and noted Ha's own performance as the uninhibited "Pikachu" Kim as one of the film's highlights. He observed that albeit the film explores themes of sexual openness and challenges conservative views, it remains "at its heart a wholesome film that reinforces monogamy and traditional family values." He emphasized that the risqué elements are conveyed through exaggerated sounds and fast-paced dialogue, with "nothing even vaguely considered erotic appearing on screen." Marsh described this as Ha's most accomplished directorial effort to date, showcasing improved technical skill and confidence while retaining his strength as a performer. Concluding his review Marsh felt the film "could have gone further," still he acknowledged its success in generating "plenty of big laughs at the expense of the prudish and closed-minded."

=== Accolades ===
Award	Date of ceremony	Category	Recipient(s)	Result	Ref.
Buil Film Awards	October 7, 2026	Art/Technical Award	Park Il-hyun	Pending	
