= Hwang Woo-seul-hye =

South Korean actress (born 1979)

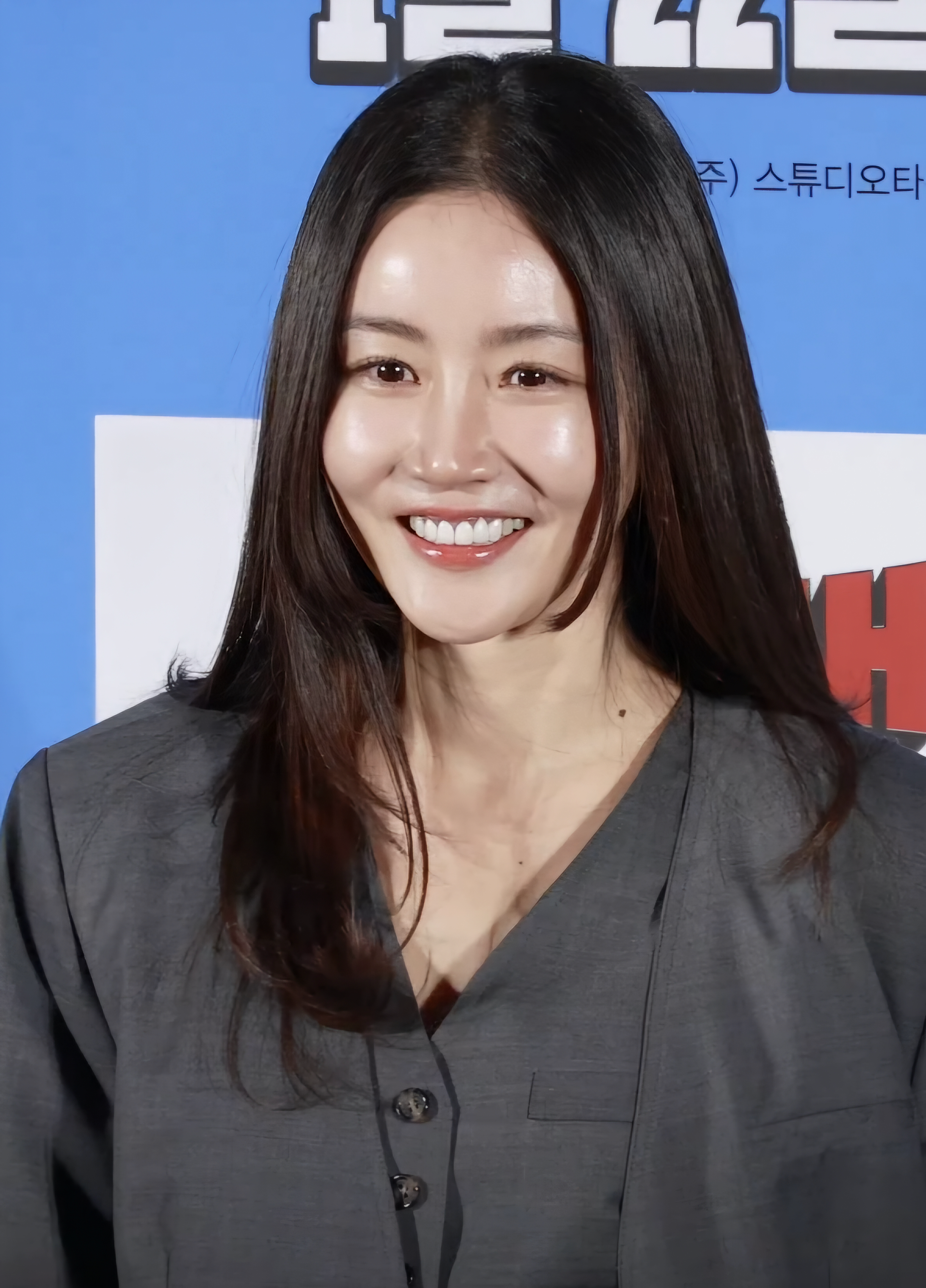
- Hwang in December 2024
- Born: Hwang Jin-hee; August 10, 1979 (age 47); Seoul, South Korea
- Education: Konkuk University (Film)
- Occupation: Actress
- Years active: 2008–present
- Agent: TH Company

Korean name
- Hangul: 황진희
- RR: Hwang Jinhui
- MR: Hwang Chinhŭi

Stage name
- Hangul: 황우슬혜
- RR: Hwang Useulhye
- MR: Hwang Usŭrhye

Hwang Jin-hee (Korean: 황진희; born August 10, 1979), better known by the stage name Hwang Woo-seul-hye (황우슬혜), is a South Korean actress. She made her acting debut as a "dumb blonde"-type character in the critically praised black comedy Crush and Blush (2008). Hwang has since played leading roles in the indie melodrama Lovers Vanished (2010), the TV sitcom I Need a Fairy (also known as Sent from Heaven, 2012), and the romantic comedy Virgin Theory: 7 Steps to Get On the Top (2014).

== Filmography ==
=== Film ===
Year	Title	Role	Ref.
2008	Crush and Blush	Lee Yoo-ri	
2008	Scandal Makers	Kindergarten teacher / Granny	
2009	Thirst	Whistle Girl	
2009	Searching for the Elephant	Ma-ri / Dr. Jang	
2010	Lovers Vanished	Yeo Mia	
2011	White: Melody of Death	Soon-ye	
2014	Virgin Theory: 7 Steps to Get On the Top	Kwon Mal-hee	
2015	Salut d'Amour	Miss Park	
2018	Love+Sling	Do-na	
2018	Sun-Kissed Family		
2020	Hitman: Agent Jun	Mi-na	
2025	Hitman 2	Mi-na	
2025	Boss	Ji-young	

=== Television series ===
Year	Title	Role	Notes	Ref.
2010	KBS Drama Special: "Our Slightly Risque Relationship"	Mo Nam-hee		
2011	Believe in Love	Choi Yoon-hee		
2012	I Need a Fairy	Chae-hwa		
2013	Drama Festival: "The Sleeping Witch"	Choi Ah-mi		
2014	Glorious Day	Jung Da-ae		
2015	The Great Wives	Oh Jung-mi		
2016	Drinking Solo	Hwang Jin-yi		
2019	Crash Landing on You	Do Hye-ji		
2019	Love with Flaws	Lee Kang Hee		
2021	So Not Worth It	Do You Know the Way lead actress	Cameo, Episode 3	
2021–2022	Uncle	Kim Yu-ra		
2022	Woori the Virgin	Obstetrician-gynecologist	Cameo, Episode 1	
2022	Café Minamdang	Lee Min-kyung		
2022	Curtain Call	Han Ji-won		
2024	Parole Examiner Lee	Choi Won-mi		

=== Variety show ===
Year	Title	Role	Notes	Ref.
2010	We Got Married - Season 2	Cast member	With Lee Sun-ho	
2025	Noona, You're my woman	Panelist		

== Awards and nominations ==
Year	Award	Category	Nominated work	Result
2008	29th Blue Dragon Film Awards	Best New Actress	Crush and Blush	Nominated
2009	45th Baeksang Arts Awards	Best New Actress	Crush and Blush	Nominated
2010	KBS Drama Awards	Best Actress in a One-Act Drama/Special	Our Slightly Risque Relationship	Nominated
2011	KBS Drama Awards	Best New Actress	Believe in Love	Nominated
