= Utawarerumono: Mask of Truth =

2016 video game

- Developer: Aquaplus
- Publishers: JP: Aquaplus; NA: Atlus USA; EU: Deep Silver; WW: DMM Games, ShiraVN (PC)
- Platforms: PlayStation 3; PlayStation 4; PlayStation Vita; Windows
- Release: September 21, 2016: PlayStation 3; JP: September 21, 2016 PlayStation 4, PlayStation Vita; JP: September 21, 2016; WW: September 5, 2017 Windows; WW: January 23, 2020
- Genres: Tactical role-playing, visual novel
- Mode: Single-player

Utawarerumono: Mask of Truth (Note: Japanese: うたわれるもの 二人の白皇, Hepburn: Utawarerumono Futari no Hakuoro) is a Japanese tactical role-playing visual novel developed by Aquaplus, which first released in September 2016 for the PlayStation 3, PlayStation 4 and PlayStation Vita. Utawarerumono: Mask of Truth is the third game in the Utawarerumono series.

An English version was published on September 5, 2017, by Atlus USA in North America and by Deep Silver in Europe. An anime adaptation of the game made by White Fox premiered in July 2022.

== Reception ==
Reception

Aggregate score
Aggregator	Score
Metacritic	PS4: 75/100

Review scores
Publication	Score
Famitsu	10/10, 8/10, 8/10, 8/10
RPGamer	4.5/5

Utawarerumono: Mask of Truth received "generally favorable" reviews, according to review aggregator Metacritic.

The game sold over 130,000 copies within its first day on sale in Japan.

== See also ==
- Utawarerumono
- Utawarerumono: Mask of Deception
