= Utawarerumono: Mask of Deception =

2015 video game

- Japanese PlayStation Vita cover art
- Developer: Aquaplus
- Publishers: JP: Aquaplus; NA: Atlus USA; EU: Deep Silver; WW: DMM Games, ShiraVN (PC)
- Platforms: PlayStation 3; PlayStation 4; PlayStation Vita; Windows
- Release: September 24, 2015: PlayStation 3; JP: September 24, 2015 PlayStation 4, PlayStation Vita; JP: September 24, 2015; WW: May 23, 2017 Windows; WW: January 23, 2020
- Genres: Tactical role-playing, visual novel
- Mode: Single-player

Utawarerumono: Mask of Deception (Note: Japanese: うたわれるもの 偽りの仮面, Hepburn: Utawarerumono Itsuwari no Kamen) is a Japanese tactical role-playing visual novel developed by Aquaplus, which first released in September 2015 for the PlayStation 3, PlayStation 4 and PlayStation Vita. Utawarerumono: Mask of Deception is the second game in the Utawarerumono series.

An English version of Utawarerumono: Mask of Deception was published on May 23, 2017, by Atlus USA in North America and by Deep Silver in Europe. An anime adaptation of Utawarerumono: Mask of Deception aired between October 2015 and March 2016.

== Plot ==
Utawarerumono: Mask of Deception follows a young man who awakens in a war-torn land with no memories of his past. He finds himself in the snowy plains of Shishiri Province in western Kujyuri. After being attacked by a monster known as a Boro-Gigiri, he is rescued by a traveling woman named Kuon, who gives him the name Haku.

Haku travels with Kuon toward the Imperial Capital. In Shishiri Province, they meet a warrior named Ukon and assist him with a Gigiri extermination job. When another Boro-Gigiri appears, they narrowly escape through cooperation. They later encounter Rulutieh, a Kujyuri princess escorting a gift to the emperor. Haku and Kuon join Ukon in escorting her to Yamato's capital. During the journey, they defeat the bandit Moznu and meet Oshtor, the Imperial General of the Right.

After arriving safely in the capital, Haku and Kuon stay at the inn Hakurokaku while searching for employment. Over time, the inn becomes a gathering place as they meet Nekone, Ukon's sister; Kiwru, prince of Ennakamuy; and Atuy, princess of Shyahoro. Oshtor later summons Haku and reveals that he and Ukon are the same person. He asks Haku to act as his substitute for a covert mission that he cannot perform due to his official status. With Kuon's approval, Haku accepts and begins working for Oshtor alongside Nosuri and Ougi, siblings who had previously assisted in Moznu's capture.

One night, Haku is summoned by a mysterious elderly man named Mito, who claims to be a former crêpe vendor and asks Haku to recount his travels. Anju, a princess of Yamato, soon begins visiting Hakurokaku and befriends the group. In an attempt to gain Oshtor's affection, she orchestrates a staged kidnapping with Nosuri's help. Although the plan fails, Haku gains recognition for rescuing her and is summoned by the Mikado, the emperor revered as a living god. The Mikado rewards Haku with the priestesses Uruuru and Saraana, who possess the power of the Kamunagi of Chains. During a later meeting, Haku realizes that Mito and the Mikado are the same person.

The northern nation of Uzurusha launches an invasion of Yamato, forcing Atuy to fight on behalf of her homeland. Haku's group encounters Jachdwalt, a swordsman coerced into fighting for Uzurusha as his adopted daughter Shinonon is held hostage. They persuade him to defect and rescue her. The invasion is ultimately repelled by Yamato's Eight Pillar Generals.

After the conflict, Mito orders Haku to investigate newly discovered ruins in Uzurusha. Deep within, the group finds a frozen humanoid figure that awakens as a Tatari and attacks them. They escape and seal the ruins, but Haku collapses from severe pain. While resting in Kuon's care, he recovers his lost memories and learns his true identity.

Haku is later summoned by Mito, who reveals the truth of the world's history. When the surface became uninhabitable, humanity retreated underground to conduct research aimed at survival. Haku had served as a test subject in his brother's experiments and was placed in suspended animation. A mysterious disease later transformed humans into Tatari. Haku's brother survived, ruled Yamato, and continued researching ancient ruins in hopes of finding him. As his life nears its end, he appoints Anju as his successor and entrusts Haku with continuing his work.

Envoys Aruruu and Camyu arrive from the neighboring nation of Tuskur and reveal that Kuon is also from Tuskur. After their departure, the emperor announces a policy shift and declares war on Tuskur, citing Yamato's previous passivity as the cause of Uzurusha's invasion. Mito later explains that the true objective is to locate the sacred ruins of Onkamiyamukai in Tuskur.

Before the campaign advances, Oshtor dispatches Haku to support General Munechika, who is struggling against Tuskur's forces. Shortly after their arrival, news reaches them that the emperor has died, prompting Yamato's retreat. Rumors soon spread that Oshtor poisoned both the emperor and Anju.

Haku's group storms the capital to rescue Oshtor and Anju, who is revealed to be alive. They are opposed by General Vurai, who refuses to recognize Anju's claim to the throne. After defeating him, the group flees to Ennakamuy. Vurai pursues them using the power of his Akuruturuka mask. Oshtor remains behind to confront him, instructing the others to escape.

Oshtor and Vurai transform into monstrous forms through their masks. When Vurai gains the advantage and threatens Nekone, Oshtor shields her and defeats him at the cost of his own life. Before disappearing, he entrusts his mask to Haku. Disguised as Oshtor, Haku announces that Haku has died and vows to protect Anju and Ennakamuy. Believing Haku dead, Kuon departs alone for Tuskur.

== Reception ==
Reception

Aggregate scores
Aggregator	Score
Metacritic	(PS4) 68/100 (VITA) 80/100
OpenCritic	29% recommend

Review score
Publication	Score
Famitsu	8/10, 8/10, 8/10, 8/10 (Vita)

Utawarerumono: Mask of Deception received "mixed or average" reviews for PlayStation 4 and "generally favorable" reviews for PlayStation Vita, according to review aggregator Metacritic. Fellow review aggregator OpenCritic assessed that the game received fair approval, being recommended by 29% of critics.

The game shipped over 100,000 copies on September 24, 2015, and subsequently sold 55,580 physical retail copies within its first week of release in Japan across all platforms.

== See also ==
- Utawarerumono
- Utawarerumono: Mask of Truth
