= The Closet (2020 film) =

2019 South Korean horror film

- Theatrical release poster
- Hangul: 클로젯
- RR: Keullojet
- MR: K'ŭllojet
- Directed by: Kim Kwang-bin
- Written by: Kim Kwang-bin
- Produced by: Kang Myeong-chan; Kim Young-hoon; Guk Soo-ran; Yoon Jong-bin; Ha Jung-woo
- Starring: Ha Jung-woo; Kim Nam-gil
- Cinematography: Choi Chan-min
- Edited by: Kim Sang-bum
- Music by: Cho Young-wook
- Production companies: Moonlight Film (Note: Acquired by and became a subsidiary of Kakao M in 2019); Perfect Storm Film
- Distributed by: CJ Entertainment
- Release date: February 5, 2020
- Running time: 98 minutes
- Country: South Korea
- Language: Korean
- Box office: US$9.2 million

The Closet (Korean: 클로젯; RR: Keullojet) is a 2020 South Korean horror film written and directed by Kim Kwang-bin, starring Ha Jung-woo and Kim Nam-gil. It follows a father's search for his missing daughter after she vanishes in their new home, and a mysterious man who claims to know the secret behind her disappearance. The film was released on February 5, 2020.

== Plot ==
Sang-won loses his wife in a sudden accident, leaving him alone with his daughter, Yi-na. In an effort to mend their strained relationship, he decides to move into a new house near the countryside. Despite Sang-won's attempts to grow closer to Yi-na, the emotional distance between them remains. One day, however, Yi-na starts smiling again, telling him she has made a new friend. But their peace is short-lived. Strange noises begin emanating from the closet in Yi-na's room, and she starts exhibiting unusual symptoms. Soon after, Sang-won himself begins having disturbing dreams. Then, without a trace, Yi-na disappears from within the house.

As Sang-won desperately searches for his daughter, a mysterious man named Kyung-hoon approaches him, claiming to know her whereabouts. The place he points to is none other than Yi-na's closet. Kyung-hoon, who has been investigating the disappearance of missing children for the past ten years, reveals an unbelievable story. Clinging to the hope of finding his daughter, Sang-won reaches out toward the closet.

Kyung-Hoon showed Sang-won detailed records of past missing children and a recording of his mother's encounter with one of the cases. His mother, in a video recording, slit her own throat during an encounter from the closet. He explains that the entity came from what he calls the dark realm, and a portal allowed them to come to our world.

Using specialty equipment, Kyung-Hoon set a trap to bait the entity from the dark realm. But the entity was wise and reversed the trap unto Kyung-Hoon and Sang-won. During this exchange, Kyung-Hoon realized the entity was Myung-jin, a girl missing from 20 years prior. Sang-won investigated Myung-jin past and realized she has been bringing children to the dark realm, as she believes that they are better off with her than their parents. Many of these children were abandoned, orphaned, and abused; Myung-jin was only protecting them.

With this understanding, Sang-won entered the dark realm to seek for Yi-na. When Myung-jin confronted Sang-won, he appealed that he wanted Yi-na back. Unconvinced, Myung-jin made Yi-na stab Sang-won but was distracted by Kyung-Hoon mimicing Myung-jin's mother. Myung-Jin broke down after seeing her mother.

Seeing the crying Myung-jin, Sang-won embraced the girl, apologizing for everything she experienced. A few moments later, Myung-jin disintegrated from the embrace. Sang-won carried Yina out of the closet, safe from the dark realm. After the whole debacle, Sang-won and Yi-na moved to a new place. Yi-na was not able to remember anything from the dark realm, which Sang-won preferred. At the ending scene, a young boy can be seen spirited away into an abandoned closet in an alley.

== Cast ==
- Ha Jung-woo as Sang-won, father of Yi-na
- Kim Nam-gil as Kyung-hoon, a self proclaimed exorcist
- Heo Yool as Yi-na, child of Sang-Won
- Kim Si-a as Myung-jin
- Shin Hyun-been as Seung-hee
- Kim Soo-jin as Myung-jin's mother
- Park Sung-woong as Myung-jin's father
- Park Ji-a as Shaman
- Lim Hyun-sung as Junior Colleague
- Kang Sin-cheol as Do-hyun
- Han Chang-min as Evil Spirit 21

== Production ==
Principal photography began on September 17, 2018, and wrapped on November 29, 2018.
