= Ha Jung-woo =

South Korean actor (born 1978)

- 하정우
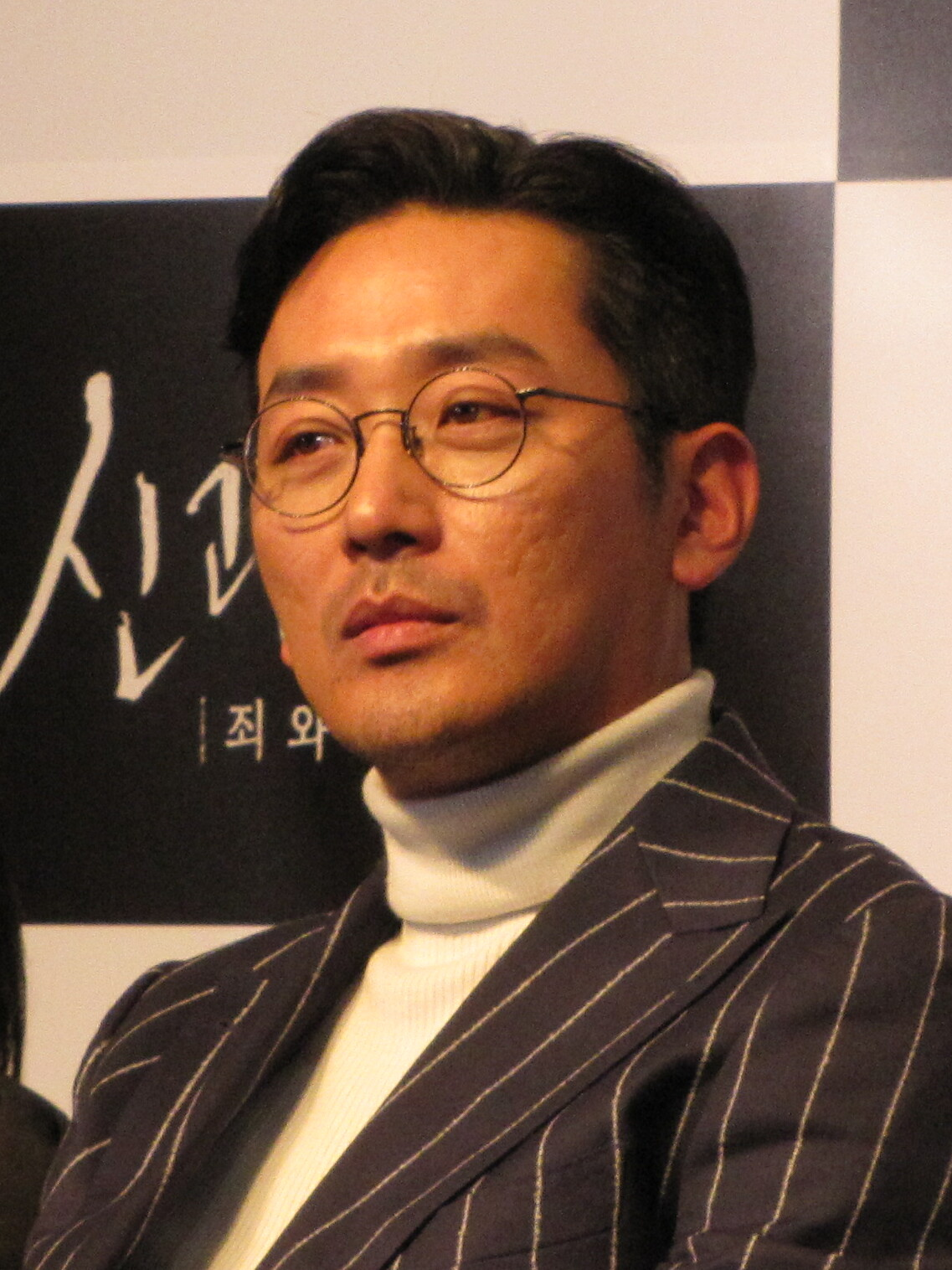
- Ha in 2017
- Born: Kim Sung-hoon; March 11, 1978 (age 48); Jamwon-dong, Seocho District, Seoul, South Korea
- Education: Chung-Ang University (School of Performing Arts and Media – Theater)
- Occupations: Actor; film director; screenwriter; film producer
- Years active: 2002–present
- Agent: Walk House Company
- Spouse: Cha Jung-won (m. 2026)
- Father: Kim Yong-gun
- Relatives: Cha Hyun-woo (brother) Hwang Bo-ra (sister-in-law)

Korean name
- Hangul: 김성훈
- Hanja: 金聖勳
- RR: Gim Seonghun
- MR: Kim Sŏnghun

Stage name
- Hangul: 하정우
- Hanja: 河正宇
- RR: Ha Jeongu
- MR: Ha Chŏngu

Kim Sung-hoon (Korean: 김성훈; born March 11, 1978), better known as Ha Jung-woo (하정우), is a South Korean actor and filmmaker. One of the highest grossing actors in South Korea, Ha's starring films have accumulated more than 100 million tickets. Only 3 other actors have reached this milestone, with Ha being nearly a decade younger than the rest when achieving this.

His breakthrough to stardom came with the role in Na Hong-jin's serial killer film The Chaser (2008). One of the leading actors of his generation in Korean cinema, Ha showcased his versatility across films of various genres: sports film Take Off (2009), action thrillers The Yellow Sea (2010) and The Terror Live (2013), gangster saga Nameless Gangster: Rules of the Time (2012), spy actioner The Berlin File (2013), period action film Kundo: Age of the Rampant (2014), and disaster thriller Tunnel (2016). Ha is also known for his role as grim reaper Gang-rim in the fantasy action film Along with the Gods: The Two Worlds (2017) and its 2018 sequel.

He made his directorial debut through the comedy film Fasten Your Seatbelt (2013), followed by Chronicle of a Blood Merchant (2015), Lobby and The People Upstairs (both 2025).

== Early life ==
Born as Kim Sung-hoon, Ha Jung-woo came from an acting family. His father Kim Yong-gun is a well-known veteran actor who has appeared in many movies and television series, while his younger brother Kim Young-hoon (stage name: Cha Hyun-woo) is an aspiring actor. Ha has said that since he was 4 or 5 years old, he has always dreamed of becoming an actor like his father. Before entering college, Ha studied at a private acting institute and at one point had actor Lee Beom-soo as his instructor. He then enrolled at Chung-Ang University as a theater major, where he acted on the stage.

In 1998, Ha began his military service, working in the Armed Forces Public Relations Department. He put his acting experience to good use during this time, appearing in 10 promotional films for the military.

== Personal life ==
In October 14, 2026, Jungwoo Ha's agency, Workhouse Company, and Cha Jung-won's agency, Saram Entertainment, officially announced that the couple will hold a private wedding on December 13.

== Career ==
=== 2002–2007: Beginnings ===
Kim Sung-hoon made his acting debut in the 2002 SBS sitcom Honest Living and his feature film debut in the 2003 film Madeleine. For the next few years, Kim's acting career was relatively low-key, appearing in several supporting roles, but not receiving a lot of attention. In 2005, Kim signed with talent agency SidusHQ and on their recommendation adopted the stage name "Ha Jung-woo." He then appeared in his first starring role in the indie film The Unforgiven, a blistering critique of the physical and psychological violence within military ranks.

Ha's subsequent roles in controversial arthouse director Kim Ki-duk's Time and Breath brought more notice to his acting talents in Korea and overseas. His portrayal of a cool-headed prosecutor who is romantically involved with a feisty police officer played by Go Hyun-jung in the popular MBC drama series H.I.T attracted female fans and gained him popularity among the masses. He also starred in the American indie film Never Forever opposite Vera Farmiga, which garnered praise from the film festival circuit.

=== 2008–2009: Breakthrough ===
Ha's breakout came in the 2008 film The Chaser, in which he played a psychopath character loosely based on serial killer Yoo Young-chul. The movie became a huge hit at the Korean box office, raking in over 5 million ticket sales, while also garnering high praise from critics and numerous awards from local award-giving bodies. American director Martin Scorsese, rumored to be attached to a Hollywood remake of The Chaser, has complimented Ha as having as much potential as his The Departed stars Leonardo DiCaprio and Matt Damon. Ha followed this up with a portrayal of a charming scoundrel in My Dear Enemy that same year, showcased his versatility and elevated his status as one of the most sought-after actors in the Korean film industry. From 2008 to 2009, he took on diverse but compelling roles in The Moonlight of Seoul, Boat, and Take Off. Take Off, based on the Korean national ski jumping team, became one of the biggest box office hits of 2009.

=== 2010–2018: Commercial and critical success ===
Ha reunited with his The Chaser director Na Hong-jin and costar Kim Yoon-seok in Na's sophomore feature The Yellow Sea, which netted Ha Best Actor awards from the Asian Film Awards, Baeksang Arts Awards and the Korean Association of Film Critics. Ha then starred in the legal thriller The Client, which evoked his early days of theater, and the director praised Ha for his "moments of true brilliance and genius" during the production. In early 2012, Samsung Electronics produced an ambitious PPL-frequent-film project featuring Galaxy Note, their latest Tablet hybrid mobile. Titled as Cine Note, the giant project comprises three shorts by directors Kang Hyeong-cheol, Jang Hoon and E J-yong. Ha played the leading role for all the three of the films, while celebrated musician Lee Seung-chul produced music using the device, and noted webtoon artists Son Jae-ho and Lee Gwang-soo created the film's animated content.

Nameless Gangster: Rules of the Time was Ha's third collaboration with longtime friend director Yoon Jong-bin, also starring acclaimed veteran actor Choi Min-sik. This was followed shortly by the unconventional romantic comedy Love Fiction opposite Gong Hyo-jin. Both were box office hits. After wrapping Love Fiction, Ha along with Gong and 14 other actors went on a cross-country walking trip from Seoul to Haenam, South Jeolla Province. Their journey was chronicled in the documentary 577 Project, denoting the total distance covered in kilometers. Ha was in charge of three aspects of the production including planning, acting and casting. He said he did it to thank fans for their support after he won back-to-back Best Actor awards at the 2010 and 2011 Baeksang Arts Awards. In Ryoo Seung-wan's The Berlin File, Ha starred as a North Korean agent in Berlin who is betrayed and cut loose in the midst of a financial espionage intrigue. He then appeared the action thriller The Terror Live, playing a news anchor with an exclusive, live broadcast on a terrorist attack.

Ha then made his directorial debut with Rollercoaster (released internationally as Fasten Your Seatbelt), based on his own screenplay about the comic interactions between the cabin crew and passengers (including an arrogant Hallyu star played by Jung Kyung-ho) of a flight from Tokyo to Gimpo International Airport which becomes in danger of crashing when the plane hits a major storm. The film was a box office success.

Working with Yoon Jong-bin again, Ha played a Joseon era butcher-turned-outlaw in the period action film Kundo: Age of the Rampant. In 2015, Ha directed, wrote and starred in Chronicle of a Blood Merchant, a film adaptation of Chinese author Yu Hua's 1995 novel. He then appeared in one of the biggest domestic hits of the year, Choi Dong-hoon's Assassination about resistance fighters given orders to kill a Japanese army commander in the colonial era.

In 2016, Ha starred again in two box office hits; Park Chan-wook's The Handmaiden, an adaptation of the Sarah Waters novel Fingersmith that changed the setting from Victorian England to 1930s Korea;, and survival thriller The Tunnel.

In 2017, Ha starred in Kim Yong-hwa's Along With the Gods: The Two Worlds, an adaptation of the webtoon Along With the Gods, about a court in the afterlife where the deceased undergo multiple trials for 49 days, and 1987: When the Day Comes, about a political crisis that led to the June Democratic Uprising in 1987 which ended the military regime of President Chun Doo-hwan.

He reprised his role as Gang-rim in the 2018 sequel, Along with the Gods: The Last 49 Days. In the same year, Ha starred in the action thriller Take Point, reuniting with The Terror Live director Kim Byung-woo.

=== 2019–present: Career fluctuations and continued directional feats ===
In 2019, Ha was cast in the science fiction action film Ashfall alongside Lee Byung-hun. The blockbuster grossed over $61 million worldwide, becoming South Korea's fourth highest-grossing domestic film of 2019. In 2020, Ha starred in the horror film The Closet.

Ha received significant recognition for his role in the 2022 Netflix series Narco-Saints. He won the Grand Prize (Daesang) at the 13th Korea Drama Awards for his performance in the series. The following year, he was nominated for Best Actor in Television at the 21st Director's Cut Awards and secured the Best Actor award at the 2nd Blue Dragon Series Awards. Furthermore, he was honored with the Best Actor in a Leading Role (National Winners – Korea) at the Asian Academy Creative Awards. In 2023, Ha starred in the sports drama film Boston 1947, which tells the story of the 1947 Boston International Marathon.

In 2024, Ha starred in the disaster film Hijack 1971, which is based on the real-life hijacking of a Korean Air flight to North Korea. In 2025, Ha made his directional comeback after ten years with the comedy films Lobby and The People Upstairs. That year, he also starred in the film Nocturnal, marking his return to the crime-thriller genre.

== Other activities ==
Ha is also an artist. Though it began as a hobby in his university days, Ha began painting in earnest in 2007. His paintings, all done in a hybrid of Pop art and Expressionist styles, have been displayed in several solo art exhibitions. Critics have said his paintings, with their strong colors and interesting composition are reminiscent of those by American artist Jean-Michel Basquiat. "Life as an actor is like living through an invisible war. Paintings soothe me and make me rational. It is too extravagant to say that painting is my hobby; it is rather a way for me to survive as an actor," said Ha.

In 2011, he published a compilation of essays titled Ha Jung-woo, Good Feeling. Besides his musings on life, Ha also wrote his thoughts on famous artists such as Pablo Picasso. The book also included about 60 of his own drawings.

== Filmography ==
Key
†	Denotes films that have not yet been released

=== Film ===
==== Acting roles ====
Year	Title	Role	Notes	Ref.
2003	Madeleine	Joon-ho	Bit part	
2004	Superstar Mr. Gam	Kim Yoo-weol		
2005	She's on Duty	Detective Jo		
2005	The Unforgiven	Yoo Tae-jeong		
2006	Time	Ji-woo		
2006	The Fox Family	Son fox		
2007	Never Forever	Kim Ji-ha		
2007	Breath	Yeon's husband		
2008	Forever the Moment	Blind date man		
2008	The Chaser	Je Yeong-min		
2008	Beastie Boys	Jae-hyun		
2008	Our School's E.T.	Handsome doctor	Bit part	
2008	My Dear Enemy	Jo Byung-woon		
2009	Like You Know It All	Mr. Cho		
2009	Boat	Hyung-gu		
2009	Take Off	Cha Heon-tae / Bob		
2010	Parallel Life	Jang Soo-young		
2010	The Yellow Sea	Gu-nam		
2011	Come Rain, Come Shine	Other man	Voice appearance	
2011	The Client	Kang Sung-hee		
2012	Nameless Gangster: Rules of the Time	Choi Hyung-bae		
2012	Love Fiction	Goo Joo-wol / Detective Ma Dong-wook		
2012	577 Project	Himself		
2013	The Berlin File	Pyo Jong-seong		
2013	The Terror Live	Yoon Young-hwa		
2014	Kundo: Age of the Rampant	Dolmuchi / Dolchi		
2015	Chronicle of a Blood Merchant	Heo Sam-gwan		
2015	Assassination	Hawaii Pistol		
2016	The Handmaiden	Count Fuijiwara		
2016	Tunnel	Jung-soo		
2017	Along With the Gods: The Two Worlds	Gang-rim		
2017	1987: When the Day Comes	Choi Hwan		
2018	Along with the Gods: The Last 49 Days	Gang-rim		
2018	Take Point	Ahab		
2019	Miss and Mrs. Cops	Motel Desk Clerk	Cameo	
2019	Ashfall	Jo In-chang		
2020	The Closet	Sang-won		
2023	Ransomed	Lee Min-jun		
2023	Road to Boston	Sohn Kee-chung		
2024	Hijack 1971	Tae-in		
2025	Nocturnal	Bae Min-tae		
2025	Lobby	Yoon Chang-wook		
2025	The People Upstairs	Mr. Kim		

==== Filmmaking credits ====
Year	Title	Director	Writer	Producer	Ref.
2013	Fasten Your Seatbelt	Yes	Yes	No	
2015	Chronicle of a Blood Merchant	Yes	Yes	No	
2017	A Single Rider	No	No	Yes	
2018	Take Point	No	No	Yes	
2019	Ashfall	No	No	Yes	
2020	The Closet	No	No	Yes	
2023	Rebound	No	No	Yes	
2025	Lobby	Yes	Yes	Yes	
2025	The People Upstairs	Yes	Yes	No	

=== Television series ===
Year	Title	Role	Notes	Ref.
2002	Honest Living	Ha Jung-woo		
2003–2004	Age of Warriors	Lee Ji-gwang		
2005	Lovers in Prague	Ahn Dong-nam		
2007	H.I.T	Kim Jae-yoon		
2016	Entourage	Himself	Cameo, ep.1	
2022	Narco-Saints	Kang In-gu		
2026	Mad Concrete Dreams	Ki Su-jong		

=== Web shows ===
Year	Title	Role	Notes	Ref.
2023	Bros On Foot	Cast Member	with Ju Ji-hoon, Choi Min-ho, and Yeo Jin-goo	
2023	Our Game: LG Twins	Storyteller	Sports Documentary	

=== Music video appearances ===
- "Betrayal" (Big Mama, 2007)

== Theater ==
- Othello (2003)
- Waiting for Godot (2002)
- The Glass Menagerie (2002)
- The Good Doctor (2001)
- Carmen (2001)
- Be Strong, Geum-soon! (2000)

== Discography ==
=== Soundtrack appearances ===
- "Alaska" (Romantic Chimpanzee feat. Ha Jung-woo - Love Fiction OST, 2012)

== Book ==
- Ha Jung-woo, Good Feeling (essays, 2011)
- Walker, Ha Jung-woo (essays, 2018)

== Accolades ==
=== Awards and nominations ===
Year presented, name of the award ceremony, award category, nominated work and result of the nomination
Year	Award	Category	Nominated work	Result	Ref.
2005	25th Korean Association of Film Critics Awards	Best New Actor	The Unforgiven	Won	
2005	8th Director's Cut Awards	Best New Actor	The Unforgiven	Won	
2005	Cine 21 Awards	Best New Actor	The Unforgiven	Won	
2006	42nd Baeksang Arts Awards	Best New Actor – Film	The Unforgiven	Nominated	
2006	27th Blue Dragon Film Awards	Best New Actor	The Unforgiven	Nominated	
2006	5th Korean Film Awards	Best New Actor	The Unforgiven	Nominated	
2006	1st Pyeongtaek Film Festival	Best New Actor	The Unforgiven, Time	Won	
2007	27th Oporto International Film Festival	Best Actor	Time	Won	
2008	3rd A-Awards (Arena Homme + and Audi Korea)	Man of the Year (Intelligence category)	—N/a	Won	
2008	11st Director's Cut Awards	Best Actor	The Chaser, My Dear Enemy	Won	
2008	17th Buil Film Awards	Best Actor	The Chaser, Beastie Boys	Nominated	
2008	16th Chunsa Film Art Awards	Best Actor	The Chaser	Won	
2008	Premiere Rising Star Awards	Best Actor	The Chaser	Won	
2008	44th Baeksang Arts Awards	Best Actor – Film	The Chaser	Nominated	
2008	9th Korea Visual Arts Festival	Photogenic Award	The Chaser	Won	
2008	45th Grand Bell Awards	Best Actor	The Chaser	Nominated	
2008	31st Golden Cinematography Awards	Best Actor	The Chaser	Won	
2008	29th Blue Dragon Film Awards	Best Leading Actor	The Chaser	Nominated	
2008	Cine 21 Awards	Best Actor	The Chaser	Won	
2008	7th Korean Film Awards	Best Actor	My Dear Enemy	Nominated	
2009	10th Busan Film Critics Awards	Best Actor	My Dear Enemy	Won	
2009	18th Buil Film Awards	Best Actor	My Dear Enemy	Won	
2009	45th Baeksang Arts Awards	Best Actor – Film	My Dear Enemy	Nominated	
2009	3rd Asian Film Awards	Best Actor	The Chaser	Nominated	
2009	3rd Mnet 20's Choice Awards	Hot Movie Star - Male	Take Off	Won	
2009	17th Chunsa Film Art Awards	Ensemble Acting Award (Cast)	Take Off	Won	
2009	46th Grand Bell Awards	Best Actor	Take Off	Nominated	
2009	5th University Film Festival of Korea	Best Actor	Take Off	Won	
2009	30th Blue Dragon Film Awards	Best Leading Actor	Take Off	Nominated	
2009	30th Blue Dragon Film Awards	Popular Star Award	Take Off	Won	
2010	5th Max Movie Awards	Best Actor	Take Off	Won	
2010	46th Baeksang Arts Awards	Best Actor – Film	Take Off	Won	
2011	5th Asian Film Awards	Best Actor	The Yellow Sea	Won	
2011	47th Baeksang Arts Awards	Best Actor – Film	The Yellow Sea	Won	
2011	20th Buil Film Awards	Best Actor	The Yellow Sea	Nominated	
2011	31st Korean Association of Film Critics Awards	Best Actor	The Yellow Sea	Won	
2012	16th Puchon International Fantastic Film Festival	Producer's Choice Award	—N/a	Won	
2012	5th Style Icon Awards	Top 10 Style Icon	—N/a	Won	
2012	55th Asia-Pacific Film Festival	Best Supporting Actor	Nameless Gangster: Rules of the Time	Nominated	
2012	21st Buil Film Awards	Best Actor	Nameless Gangster: Rules of the Time	Nominated	
2012	7th Pierson Movie Festival	Best Actor	Nameless Gangster: Rules of the Time	Won	
2012	33rd Blue Dragon Film Awards	Best Leading Actor	Nameless Gangster: Rules of the Time	Nominated	
2012	33rd Blue Dragon Film Awards	Popular Star Award	Nameless Gangster: Rules of the Time	Won	
2013	7th Asian Film Awards	Best Supporting Actor	Nameless Gangster: Rules of the Time	Nominated	
2013	49th Baeksang Arts Awards	Best Actor – Film	The Berlin File	Won	
2013	8th A-Awards (Arena Homme + and Audi Korea)	Charismatic Award	—N/a	Won	
2013	14th Busan Film Critics Awards	Best Actor	The Terror Live	Won	
2013	22nd Buil Film Awards	Best Actor	The Terror Live	Nominated	
2013	34th Blue Dragon Film Awards	Best Leading Actor	The Terror Live	Nominated	
2014	9th Max Movie Awards	Best Actor	The Terror Live	Nominated	
2014	34th Golden Cinema Film Festival	Grand Prize (Daesang)	The Terror Live	Won	
2014	50th Baeksang Arts Awards	Best New Director – Film	The Terror Live	Nominated	
2014	50th Baeksang Arts Awards	Best New Director – Film	Fasten Your Seatbelt	Nominated	
2014	9th Osaka Asian Film Festival	Most Promising Talent	Fasten Your Seatbelt	Won	
2014	9th Osaka Asian Film Festival	Grand Prix Award	Fasten Your Seatbelt	Nominated	
2015	20th Chunsa Film Art Awards	Best Actor	Kundo: Age of the Rampant	Won	
2015	35th Hawaii International Film Festival	Renaissance Award	—N/a	Won	
2015	52nd Grand Bell Awards	Best Actor	Assassination	Nominated	
2016	37th Blue Dragon Film Awards	Best Leading Actor	The Tunnel	Nominated	
2016	53rd Grand Bell Awards	Best Actor	The Tunnel	Nominated	
2017	53rd Baeksang Arts Awards	Best Actor – Film	The Tunnel	Nominated	
2017	22nd Chunsa Film Art Awards	Best Actor	The Tunnel	Won	
2018	52nd Taxpayers' Day	Presidential Commendation	—N/a	Won	
2018	Florence Korea Film Fest	Cultural Award	—N/a	Won	
2018	7th Marie Claire Film Awards	BestPioneer Award	Along With the Gods: The Two Worlds	Won	
2018	2nd The Seoul Awards	Best Actor (Film)	Along With the Gods: The Two Worlds	Won	
2018	39th Blue Dragon Film Awards	Best Leading Actor	Along With the Gods: The Two Worlds	Nominated	
2018	23rd KCA Consumer Day Awards	Best Film Actor	Along With the Gods: The Two Worlds	Won	
2018	3rd Asia Artist Awards	Artist of the Year	—N/a	Won	
2018	3rd Asia Artist Awards	Best Artist	—N/a	Won	
2018	3rd Asia Artist Awards	Fabulous Award	—N/a	Won	
2019	3rd Korea–China International Festival	Best Actor (Korea Film Contribute)	Take Point	Won	
2021	Brussels International Fantastic Film Festival	Silver Crow Award	The Closet	Won	
2022	13th Korea Drama Awards	Grand Prize (Daesang)	Narco-Saints	Won	
2023	21st Director's Cut Awards	Best Actor in Television	Narco-Saints	Nominated	
2023	2nd Blue Dragon Series Awards	Best Actor	Narco-Saints	Won	
2023	Asian Academy Creative Awards	Best Actor in A Leading Role (National Winners – Korea)	Narco-Saints	Won	
2024	29th KCA Consumer Day Awards	Best Film Actor	Hijack 1971	Won	
2025	10th London Asia Film Festival	LEAFF Honorary Award	The People Upstairs	Won	

=== State honors ===
Name of country, year given, and name of honor
Country	Ceremony	Year	Honor Or Award	Ref.
South Korea	Korean Popular Culture and Arts Awards (Note: Honors are given at the Korean Popular Culture and Arts Awards, arranged by the Korea Creative Content Agency and hosted by the Ministry of Culture, Sports and Tourism. They are awarded to those who have contributed to the arts and South Korea's pop culture.)	2012	Prime Minister Commendation	
South Korea	52nd Taxpayer's Day (Note: Honors are given at the Taxpayers' Day, organized by National Tax Service, Taxpayers' Day in Korea is March 3. An award ceremony is held annually, during which individuals and corporations receive commendation for being model taxpayers.)	2018	Presidential Commendation for Exemplary Tax Payer	

=== Listicles ===
Name of publisher, year listed, name of listicle, and placement
Publisher	Year	Listicle	Placement	Ref.
Forbes	2010	Korea Power Celebrity 40	17th	
Forbes	2015	Korea Power Celebrity 40	27th	
Forbes	2016	Korea Power Celebrity 40	23rd	
Forbes	2017	Korea Power Celebrity 40	31st	
Forbes	2018	Korea Power Celebrity 40	34th	
Forbes	2019	Korea Power Celebrity 40	38th	
Herald Business Daily	2013	Pop Culture Power Leader Big 30	7th (Note: Tied with Song Kang-ho)	
The Screen	2019	2009–2019 Top Box Office Powerhouse Actors in Korean Movies	1st	
Sisa Journal	2008	Next Generation Leader—Film Industry	6th	
