= Busan Award for Best Actor =

Award given to the best performance at the Busan International Film Festival

- 2026 recipient: Zhou Xun and Kashun Himeno
- Awarded for: Best acting performance
- Country: South Korea
- Presented by: Busan International Film Festival
- First award: 2025
- Currently held by: Zhou Xun for The First Taste of Loneliness; Kashun Himeno for Satoko Always

The Busan Award for Best Actor (Korean: 부산 어워드 배우상) is an award given at the Busan International Film Festival. It was first awarded in 2025. The prize is presented to two performers in recognition of their outstanding performances in films competing in the Competition section. Each recipient receives a cash prize of KRW 10 million.

== History ==
In 2025, to mark its 30th anniversary, the Busan International Film Festival introduced a new competition section and presented several awards under the Busan Awards category, including Best Film, Best Director, the Special Jury Prize, Best Actor (awarded to two individuals), and the Artistic Contribution Award.

Korean actress Lee Ji-won for her performance in the film En Route To and the ensemble of Japanese actors for their performances in Baka's Identity including Takumi Kitamura, Go Ayano and Yuta Hayashi were the prizes inaugural winners at the 30th edition. At the 31st edition, the first edition of the festival to receive FIAPF accreditation as an A-list film festival, Chinese actress Zhou Xun and Japanese actress Kashun Himeno won the prize for their roles in The First Taste of Loneliness and Satoko Always, respectively.

== Winners ==
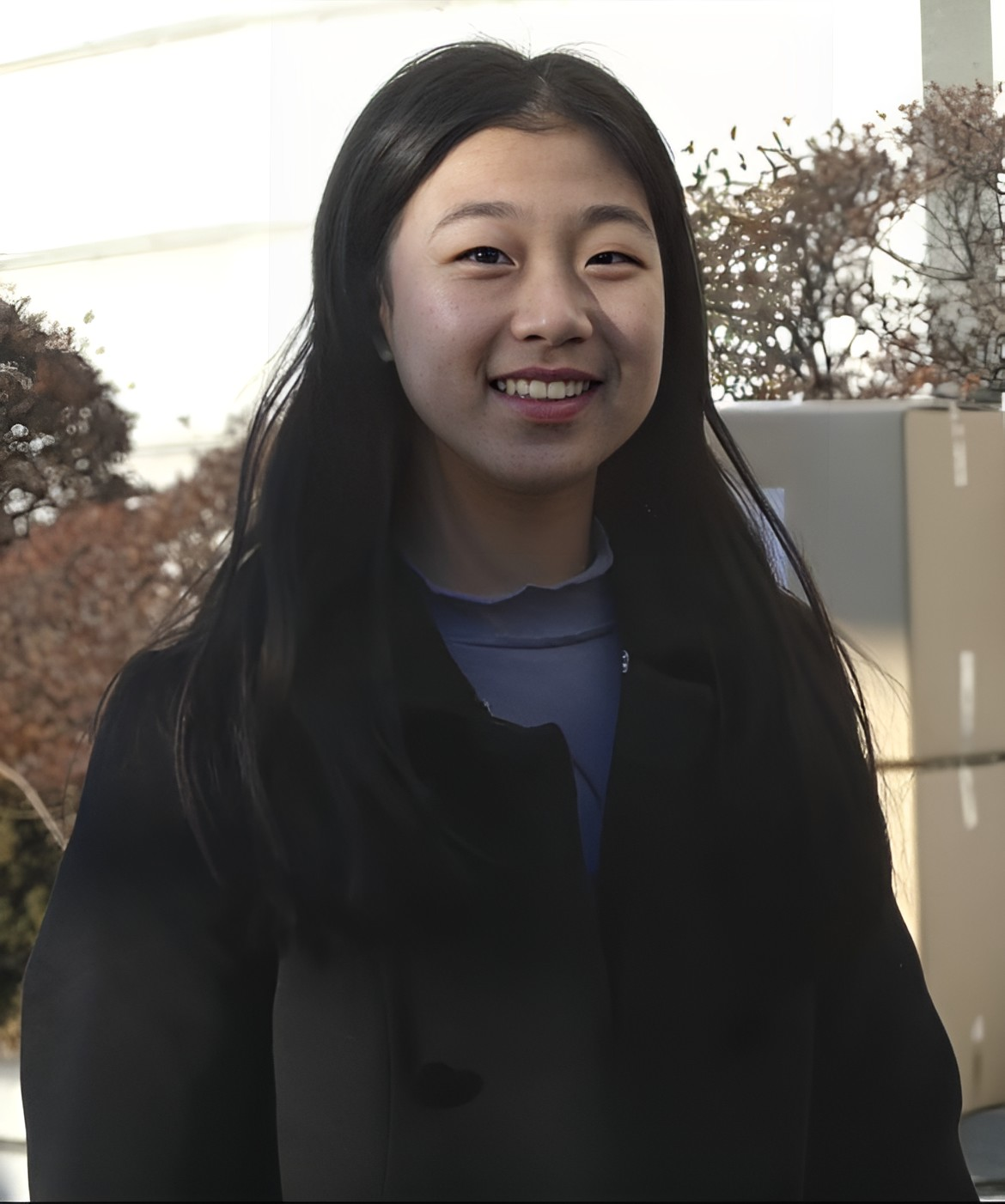
Lee Ji-won was one of the first recipient for En Route To (2025)

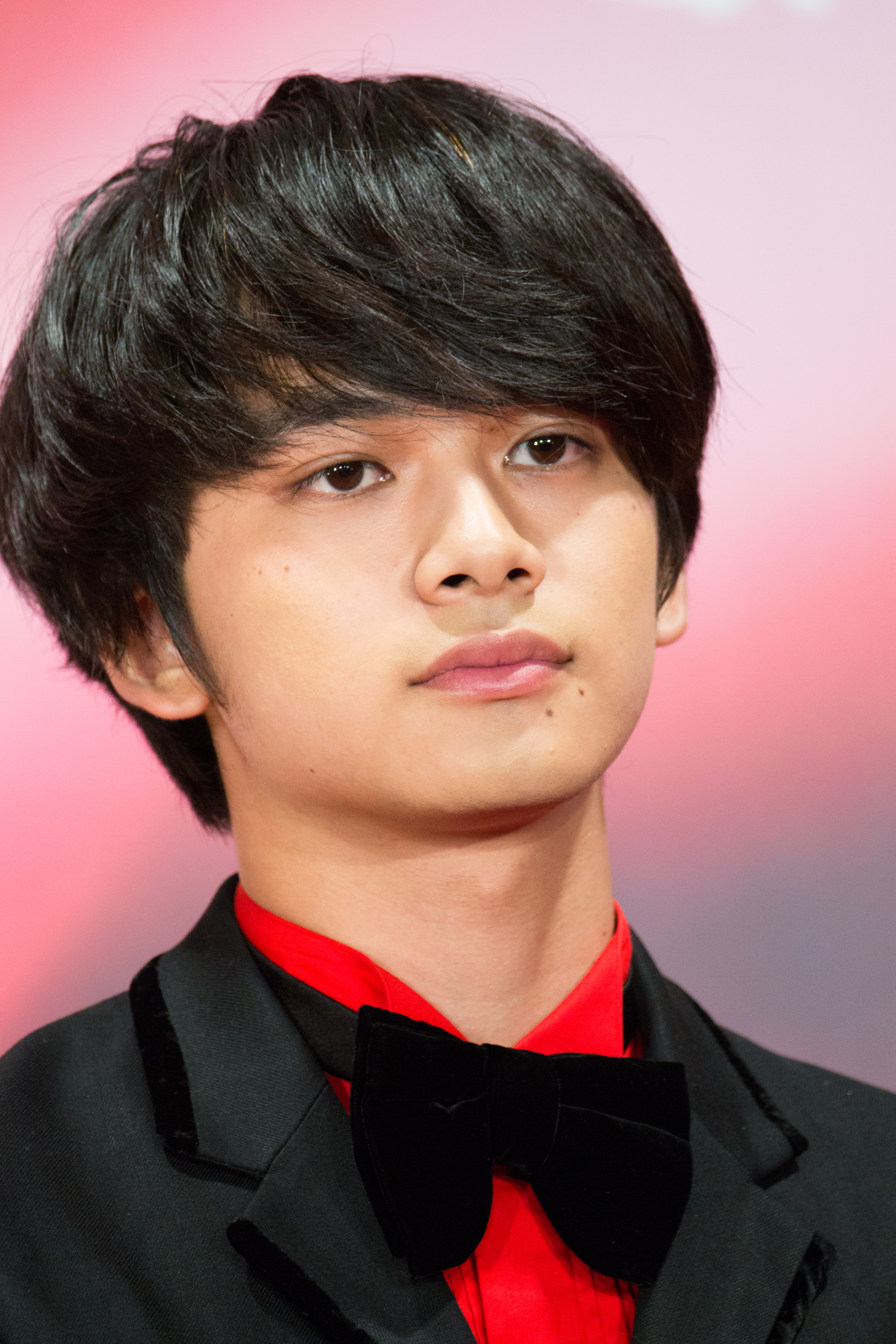
Takumi Kitamura was one of the first recipient for Baka's Identity (2025)

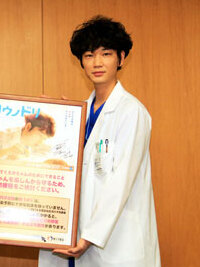
Go Ayano was one of the first recipient for Baka's Identity (2025)

Zhou Xun won for The First Taste of Loneliness (2026), the first edition of the festival to receive FIAPF accreditation as an A-list film festival

Kashun Himeno won for Satoko Always (2026), the first edition of the festival to receive FIAPF accreditation as an A-list film festival

Year	Performer	Role(s)	English title	Original title	Ref.
2025	Lee Ji-won	Kyung-sun	En Route To	지우러 가는 길	
2025	Takumi Kitamura	Takuya Matsumoto	Baka's Identity	愚か者の身分	
2025	Yuta Hayashi	Mamoru Kakizaki	Baka's Identity	愚か者の身分	
2025	Go Ayano	Kenshi Kajitani	Baka's Identity	愚か者の身分	
2026	Zhou Xun	Jiang Yue	The First Taste of Loneliness	初次尝到寂寞	
2026	Kashun Himeno	Satoko Nakai	Satoko Always	さとこはいつも	
