= 30th Busan International Film Festival =

2025 edition of film festival

- BIFF official poster
- Opening film: No Other Choice by Park Chan-wook
- Closing film: Gloaming in Luomu by Zhang Lü
- Location: Busan Cinema Center
- Founded: 1995
- Awards: Busan Awards; Camellia Award: Sylvia Chang; New Currents Award; The Asian Filmmaker of the Year: Jafar Panahi; Korean Film Achievement Award: Chung Ji-young
- Directors: Jung Han-seok
- Hosted by: Korean Film Council; Supported by: Ministry of Culture, Sports and Tourism; Metropolitan City of Busan
- Artistic director: Choi Soon-dae
- No. of films: 241 official Selection
- Festival date: Opening: September 17, 2025; Closing: September 26, 2025
- Website: www.biff.kr/eng/

Busan International Film Festival
- 31st 29th

The 30th Busan International Film Festival (Korean: 제30회 부산국제영화제) was held from September 17 to September 26, 2025, at the Busan Cinema Center in Busan. The festival celebrating its 30th anniversary, opened with the South Korean black comedy thriller film No Other Choice by Park Chan-wook. Na Hong-jin, South Korean film director, producer and screenwriter served as President of the Competition jury.

In celebration of the 30th anniversary, festival started a new competition segment featuring approximately 14 Asian films, and presented various 'Busan Awards' such as Best Film, Best Director, Special Jury Prize, Best Actor for two individuals, and an Artistic Contribution accolade. The current New Currents and Kim Jiseok categories were merged into this updated competitive section. The festival has also broadened its scope, featuring 241 films compared to 224 previously, and adding more screening locations. It also extended the Midnight Passion segment from two to four nights, revamping the Vision category, and bringing back the Asian Cinema 100 project, which originally debuted in 2015.

On September 25, Busan Vision Awards' winners were announced. 2025 Indonesian drama film On Your Lap by Reza Rahadian, a story of a Kopi pangku waitress, won four awards including KB Vision Audience Award, Fipresci Award, Bishkek International Film Festival's Central Asia Cinema Award, and the Face of the Future Award.

The festival closed on September 26, with closing ceremony hosted by Claudia Kim. Zhang Lü's Chinese road film Gloaming in Luomu won the best film while Shu Qi won the best director award for her 2025 coming-of-age drama film Girl.

== Overview ==
The film registration for the festival began in March 2025 with the closing date for submission fixed for July 2, 2025. To celebrate its 30th anniversary, the festival opened public voting for its popular 'Request Cinema' program on July 15, 2025. While the main screenings took place at the Busan Cinema Center in the Haeundae District, selected films are also shown at various venues across the southeastern port city. The festival programme was announced in a press conference on August 26, 2025.

- The New Currents Award

Although 'The New Currents' section was merged into the newly created Competition and Vision sections, the festival retained the New Currents Award, recognizing a debut feature by a first-time filmmaker chosen from entries in the Competition and Vision categories. A dedicated jury oversaw the selection for this award. In addition, the festival overhauled its opening and closing ceremonies: the closing event now highlights the awards for the competition section, followed by a screening of the Best Film winner in place of a separate closing title. This year's ceremonies will be helmed by the South Korean director Min Kyu-dong.

- Trophy

To mark the introduction of its first competitive section, the festival has commissioned a newly designed trophy by the Thai filmmaker and installation artist Apichatpong Weerasethakul.

- Poster

This year's official poster crafted by art director Choi Soon-dae encapsulates 30 years of shared passion between audiences and filmmakers. Featuring a central seal embedded in red sand, it symbolizes the festival's identity and legacy. The dynamic calligraphic "30," brushed in traditional style, bridges heritage with modern design, reflecting both the history and evolving spirit of the festival.

- Again, Asking the Path of Asian Cinema

In its 30th year, the festival and the Jiseok Film Institute will host "Forum BIFF" from September 18 to 21 at the Film Industry Center. This four-day event will examine the present and future of Asian cinema amid global content shifts, featuring discussions on industry, policy, criticism, technology, and education. Filmmakers, producers, critics, and scholars from across Asia will gather to address key trends and challenges shaping the region's film landscape.

- European Women Filmmakers Take Center Stage

As part of the festival's commitment to promoting diverse cinematic perspectives, 16 films directed by European women have been officially selected for screening under the program EUROPE! VOICES OF WOMEN+ IN FILM. The program is presented in partnership with European Film Promotion (EFP) and showcases a wide range of genres, styles, and narratives that reflect the richness of contemporary European cinema.

30th Eve

The '30th Eve' event to wish the success of the festival was held on September 16, at the outdoor stage of BIFF Square in Nampo-dong. The event was hosted by South Korean acor Lee Jong-hyuk and South Korean singer, actress, and radio personality, Park Gyu-ri. The event opened with a performance by South Korean singer-songwriter, composer, musical actress and television presenter BADA. Two South Korean film directors from Busan, Yoon Je-kyoon and Jung Woo were honoured with the ‘Busan’s Beloved Film Icon’ award.

Screening venues

- Busan Cinema Center
- CGV Centum City
- Lotte Cinema Centum City
- KOFIC Theater
- Dongseo University Sohyang Theatre ShinhanCard Hall
- Busan Community Media Center
- Community BIFF:
  - Megabox Busan Theater
  - Catholic Center Space101.1

Honorary awards

In the opening ceremony, Jafar Panahi, Iranian film director, screenwriter, and editor received 'The Asian Filmmaker of the Year' award for his "significant contribution to the development of the Asian film industry and culture", whereas Chung Ji-young, South Korean film director and screenwriter was conferred with the Korean Film Achievement Award, while the Camellia Award was awarded to Sylvia Chang, Taiwanese actress, singer, and director.

Final report

238,697 total visitors attended the festival, including 63,000 people who were part of various events held throughout the festival. 328 films including, official Selection of 241 films from 64 countries and 87 Community BIFF films were screened.

== Jury ==
=== Competition jury ===
The festival announced seven Jury members for the Competition section on September 3, presided over by Na Hong-jin.

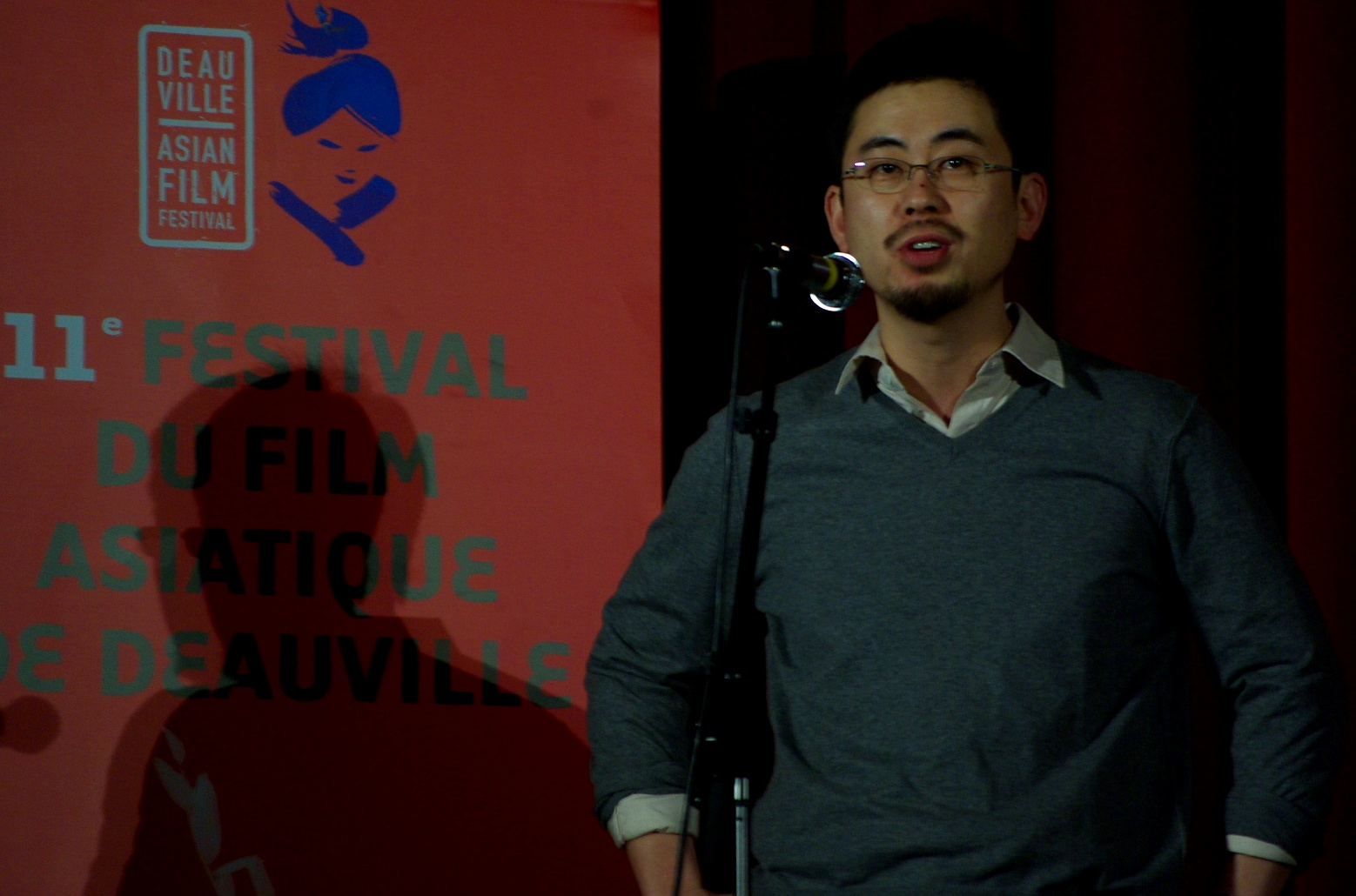
Na Hong-jin, President of the Competition jury

- Na Hong-jin, South Korean film director, producer and screenwriter, (President of jury)
- Tony Leung Ka-fai, Hong Kong actor
- Nandita Das, Indian actress and director
- Marzieh Meshkini, Iranian cinematographer, film director and writer.
- Kogonada, American filmmaker
- Yulia Evina Bhara, Indonesian film and theatre producer
- Han Hyo-joo, South Korean actress

=== New Currents Award Jury ===
Emerging Asian Filmmakers

- Jessica Kiang, Berlin based critic
- Alexandre Koberidze, Georgian filmmaker and screenwriter
- Oh Seung-uk, South Korean director

=== Documentary Competition – BIFF Mecenat Award Jury ===
- Ito Shiori, Japanese journalist-filmmaker
- Kim Mire, director
- Basil Tsiokos, Senior Programmer for Documentaries at the Sundance Film Festival.

=== Korean, Asian Short Film Competition – Sonje Award Jury ===
- Ratchapoom Boonbunchachoke, Thai director
- Byun Young-joo, South Korean film and television director
- Lee Hong-chi, Taiwanese actor, director

=== Vision - Asia – NETPAC Award Jury ===
- Diana Ashimova, a member of the NETPAC, producer, and festival programmer
- Baek Jae-ho, Chairperson of the Association of Korean Independent Film & Video
- Teng Lee Yein, producer

=== Vision - Asia – FIPRESCI Award Jury ===
- Narendra Bandabe, Journalist, film critic
- Sofía Ferrero Cárrega, film critic from Argentina
- Kim Mee-hyun, Professor at Sungkyunkwan University, researcher on Korean film history

=== Actor of the Year Award ===
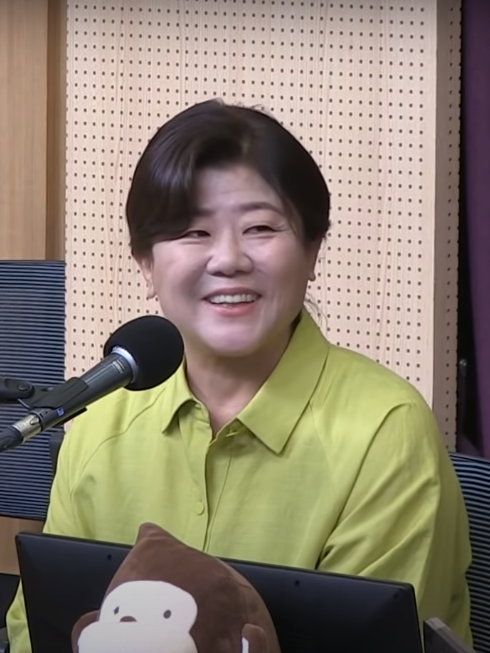
Lee Jung-eun, Actor of the Year Award jury member

- Lee Jung-eun, South Korean actress
- Teo Yoo, South Korean actor

=== DGK PLUS M Award ===
- Kim Jung-ho, South Korean director
- Nam Yeon-woo, South Korean actor, director
- Seo Yoo-min, South Korean film director

=== KBS Independent Film Award ===
- Kim Bo-nyun, South Korean programmer and critic
- Roh Deok, South Korean film director and screenwriter
- Ahn Gooc-jin, South Korean film director and screenwriter

=== Critic b Award ===
- Park In-ho, South Korean Critic
- Lee-Dongyun, South Korean Critic
- Lee Ha-neal, South Korean Critic

=== CINE21 Award Juries ===
- Chang, Yeong-yeop, CEO, Cine21
- Song Hyeong-guk, Journalist, Critic for KBS
- Oh Jin-woo, Critic

== Opening and closing ceremonies ==
=== Opening ceremony ===
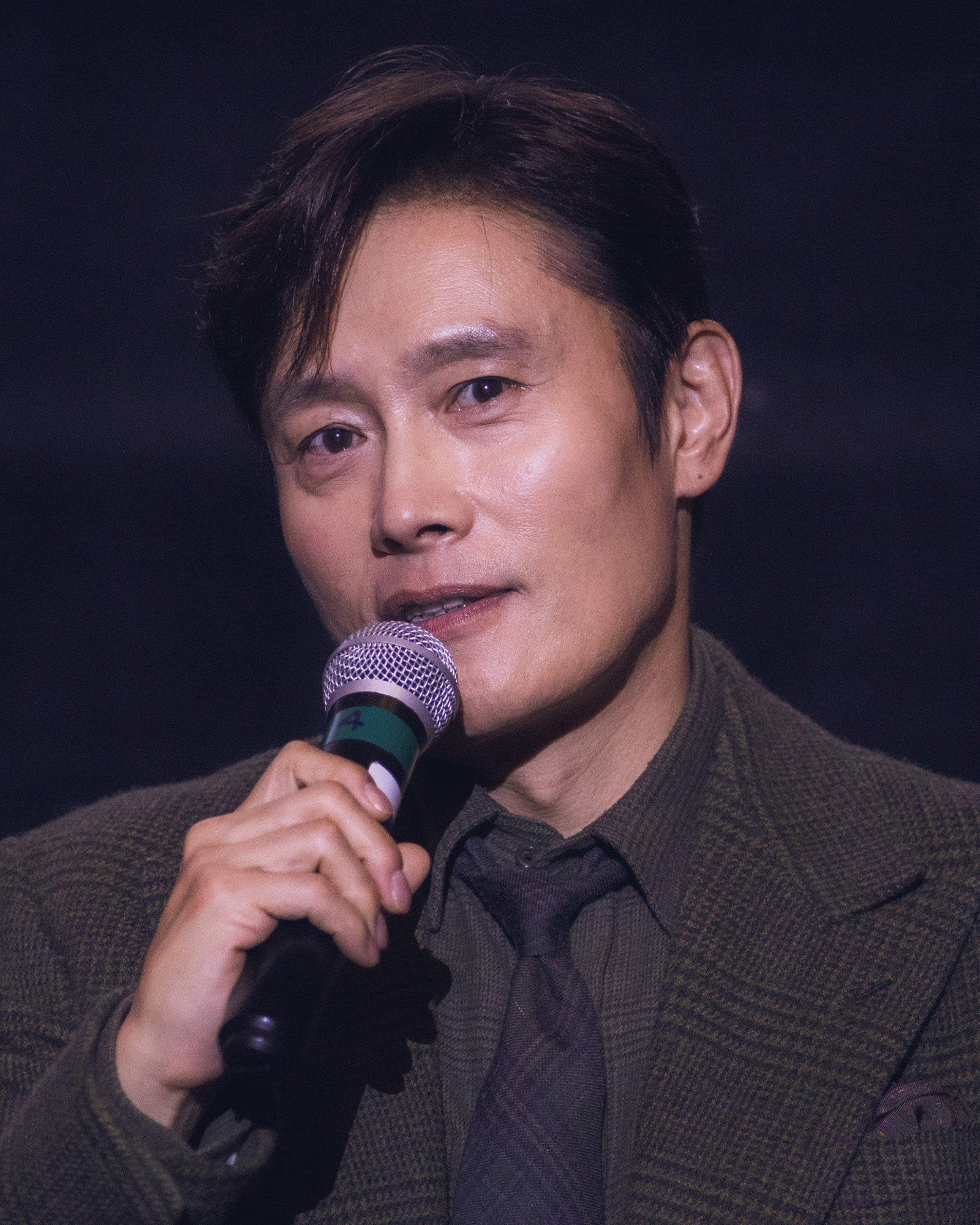
Lee Byung-hun host of the opening ceremony

The opening ceremony of the festival was held on 17 September at the Busan Cinema Center Outdoor Theater in Haeundae and was broadcast live on Naver TV, CHZZK and YouTube. The event was hosted by actor Lee Byung-hun and attended by several Korean and international film stars, including Milla Jovovich, Tony Leung Ka-fai, Kentaro Sakaguchi, Ken Watanabe, Jafar Panahi, Guillermo del Toro, Kogonada, Sylvia Chang, Michael Mann, and Maggie Kang. Sylvia Chang received the Camellia Award "for breaking boundaries across generations and roles, expanding the path for Asian women in cinema." Jafar Panahi was presented with the Asian Filmmaker Award, and Chung Ji-young received the Korean Film Achievement Award.

=== Closing ceremony ===
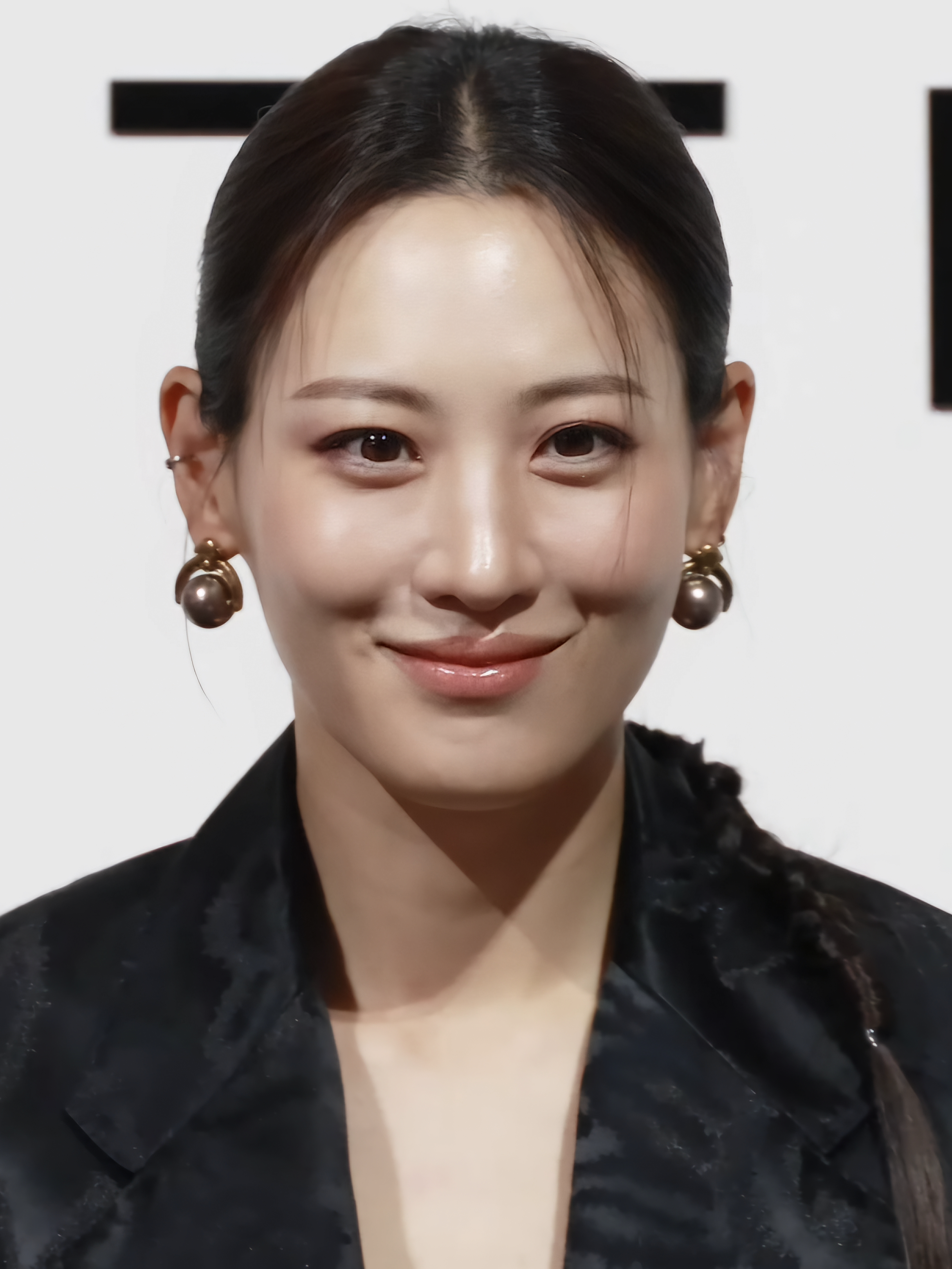
Claudia Kim host of the closing ceremony

Claudia Kim hosted the closing ceremony on September 26, 2025. It featured award presentations by prominent filmmakers, recognizing excellence across various categories. During the ceremony, the award-winning films were also officially presented. It was broadcast live on Naver TV, CHZZK and YouTube.

== Events ==
=== 'K-Pop Demon Hunters' Sing-Along Screening ===
The special sing-along screening of KPop Demon Hunters, a 2025 American animated musical urban fantasy film will be held at Dongseo University's Sohyang Theater Shinhan Card Hall, Centum Campus, Haeundae District, Busan as an event of the festival.

=== Commemorative stamp album ===
On August 25, 2025, the festival unveiled a commemorative stamp album featuring personalized stamps, along with a special edition postcard, created in collaboration with the Busan Regional Post Office.

=== Actors House ===
In this edition the following actors will share unknown behind-the-scenes stories and their future plans with the audience:

- Lee Byung-hun, South Korean actor
- Son Ye-jin, South Korean actress
- Kim You-jung, South Korean actress
- Kazunari Ninomiya, Japanese singer, songwriter, actor, voice actor, presenter and radio host

=== Creative Asia ===
Netflix in partnership with the Festival will host Creative Asia for its second year on September 20, highlights are:

- Masters of Imagination: Guillermo del Toro and Yeon Sang-ho in Conversation
- Behind the Scenes of KPop Demon Hunters with Maggie Kang
- Breaking the Mold of Period Filmmaking with Yui Miyamori
- Shifting the Lens: Directing Film vs. Series with Leste Chen

== Program sections ==
The following sections will be there in the anniversary edition:

- Competition
- Gala Presentation
- Icons
- Vision
- A Window on Asian Cinema
- Korean Cinema Today - Special Premiere
- Korean Cinema Today - Panorama
- World Cinema
- Flash Forward
- Wide Angle
- Open Cinema
- Midnight Passion
- On Screen
- Special Program in Focus
  - Our Little History, Please Take Care of Our Future!
  - Decisive Moments in Asian Cinema
  - 'Carte Blanche'
  - Special Screening

=== Opening film ===
No Other Choice starring Lee Byung-hun and Son Ye-jin, a story of Man-su and "his own war of survival." was selected as opening film of the festival.

English title	Original title	Director(s)	Production country(ies)
No Other Choice	어쩔수가없다	Park Chan-wook	South Korea

=== Competition ===
The competition section of the festival features 14 Asian films selected for their artistic merit and regional significance. These entries will vie for the 'Busan Awards', which are presented in five categories: Grand Prize, Best Director, Special Jury Prize, Best Actor, and Best Artistic Contribution.

Highlighted title indicates award winner

English title	Original title	Director(s)	Production country(ies)
Seven O'Clock Breakfast Club for the Brokenhearted	실연당한 사람들을 위한 일곱 시 조찬모임	Lim Sun-ae	South Korea
Another Birth		Isabelle Kalandar	Tajikistan, United States, Qatar
Baka's Identity	愚か者の身分	Koto Nagata	Japan
By Another Name		Lee Je-han	South Korea
En Route To	지우러 가는 길	Yoo Jae-in	South Korea
Funky Freaky Freaks	충충충	Han Chang-rok	South Korea
Girl	女孩	Shu Qi	Taiwan, China
Gloaming in Luomu	罗目的黄昏	Zhang Lü	China
Left-Handed Girl	左撇子女孩	Shih-Ching Tsou	Taiwan
Leave the Cat Alone	猫を放つ	Daisuke Shigaya	Japan
Spying Stars		Vimukthi Jayasundara	Sri Lanka, France, India
Resurrection	狂野时代	Bi Gan	China, France
Two Seasons, Two Strangers	旅と日々	Sho Miyake	Japan
Without Permission		Hassan Nazer	Iran, United Kingdom

=== Gala Presentation ===
In this section 4 films will be presented by their directors and casts, attending the presentation.

English title	Original title	Director(s)	Production country(ies)
Frankenstein		Guillermo del Toro	United States
Good News	굿뉴스	Byun Sung-hyun	South Korea
It Was Just an Accident	یک تصادف ساده	Jafar Panahi	Iran, France, Luxembourg
Kokuho	国宝	Lee Sang-il	Japan

=== Icons ===
This section showcases the latest works by masters. It now has 33 film, 16 more than last year.

English title	Original title	Director(s)	Production country(ies)
Alpha		Julia Ducournau	France, Belgium
A Big Bold Beautiful Journey		Kogonada	United States
A House of Dynamite		Kathryn Bigelow	United States
A Magnificent Life	Marcel et Monsieur Pagnol	Sylvain Chomet	France, Canada, Belgium, Luxembourg, United States
Back Home		Tsai Ming-liang	Taiwan
Below the Clouds	Sotto le nuvole	Gianfranco Rosi	Italy
Bugonia		Yorgos Lanthimos	Ireland, South Korea, United States
Dracula		Radu Jude	Romania, Austria, Luxembourg
Dreams		Michel Franco	Mexico, United States
Dreams (Sex Love)	Drømmer	Dag Johan Haugerud	Norway
Duse		Pietro Marcello	Italy, France
Eagles of the Republic		Tarik Saleh	Sweden, France, Denmark, Finland
Enzo		Robin Campillo	France, Italy, Belgium
Father Mother Sister Brother		Jim Jarmusch	United States, Ireland, France
Franz		Agnieszka Holland	Czech Republic, Poland, Germany, France, Turkey
Jay Kelly		Noah Baumbach	United Kingdom, United States
La grazia		Paolo Sorrentino	Italy
Magellan	Magalhães	Lav Diaz	Portugal, Spain, Philippines, France
Miroirs No. 3		Christian Petzold	Germany
Nouvelle Vague		Richard Linklater	France
Orphan	Árva	László Nemes	Hungary, France, Germany, United Kingdom
Romería		Carla Simón	Spain, Belgium, Germany
Sentimental Value	Affeksjonsverdi	Joachim Trier	Norway, France, Germany, Denmark, Sweden, United Kingdom
Sirāt		Oliver Laxe	Spain, France
The Lost Bus		Paul Greengrass	United States
The Love That Remains	Ástin Sem Eftir Er	Hlynur Pálmason	Iceland, Denmark, France, Finland, Sweden
The Mastermind		Kelly Reichardt	United States, United Kingdom
The Secret Agent	O Agente Secreto	Kleber Mendonça Filho	Brazil, France, Germany, Netherlands
Silent Friend	Stille Freundin	Ildikó Enyedi	Germany, France, Hungary
The Stranger	L'Étranger	François Ozon	France
The Wizard of the Kremlin	Le mage du Kremlin	Olivier Assayas	France
Young Mothers	Jeunes mères	Jean-Pierre and Luc Dardenne	Belgium, France
Two Prosecutors	Два прокурора	Sergei Loznitsa	Latvia, France, Germany, Netherlands, Romania, Lithuania

=== Vision ===
23 independent films from Asia, including Korea, will be showcased in this expanded and revamped section.

English title	Original title	Director(s)	Production countrie(s)
Vision – Asia
All Greens	万事快調 オール・グリーンズ	Takashi Koyama	Japan
Black Rabbit, White Rabbit		Shahram Mokri	Tajikistan, United Arab Emirates
Girlfriends	女孩不平凡	Tracy Choi	Macau, Taiwan, Hong Kong, Thailand
If on a Winter's Night		Sanju Surendran	India
Kok Kok Kokoook		Maharshi Tuhin Kashyap	India
Kurak		Erke Dzhumakma Tova, Emil Atageldiev	Kyrgyzstan
Malika		Natalia Uvarova	Kazakhstan, Moldova, Ireland
Mothernet	Esok Tanpa Ibu	Ho Wi-ding	Indonesia, Singapore
On Your Lap	Pangku	Reza Rahadian	Indonesia, Saudi Arabia
Shape of Momo		Tribeny Rai	India, South Korea
Tiger	Taiga	Anshul Chauhan	Japan
Vision – Korea
The Accordion Door	8 아코디언 도어	Son Kyeong-su	South Korea
Beautiful Dreamer	단장	Lee Kwang-kuk	South Korea
Coming of Age	철들 무렵	Jeong Seung-o	South Korea
The Gorals	산앙들	Yoo Jaewook	South Korea
Journey There	12 흐르는 여정	Kim Jinyu	South Korea
The Love of Truman	트루먼의 사랑	Kim Dukjoong	South Korea
Maze	미로	Shin Sun	South Korea
(the) Mutation	사랑의 탄생	Shin Su-won	South Korea
The Observer's Journal	관찰자의 일지	Lim Jung-hwan	South Korea
The Second Child	두 번째 아이	Yu Eun-jeong	South Korea
Two Voices Into the Echo	9 우아한 시체	Kim Kyung-rae	South Korea
Winter Days	겨울날들	Choi Seung-woo	South Korea

=== A Window on Asian Cinema ===
English title	Original title	Director(s)	Production countrie(s)
A Dance in Vain	李鴻其	Lee Hong-chi	China
A Useful Ghost	ผีใช้ได้ค่ะ	Ratchapoom Boonbunchachoke	Thailand, France, Singapore, Germany
After Dreaming	Երազելուց հետո	Christine Haroutounian	Armenia, United States, Mexico
Amoeba		Tan Siyou	Singapore, Netherlands, France, Spain, South Korea
Bayaan		Bikas Mishra	India
Becoming		Zhannat Alshanova	France, Kazakhstan, Netherlands, Lithuania, Sweden
Becoming Human		Polen Ly	Cambodia
The Botanist		Yi Jing	China
Dear Stranger	ディア・ストレンジャー	Tetsuya Mariko	Japan, Taiwan, United States
Don't Tell Mother		Anoop Lokkur	India, Australia
The Fox King		Woo Ming Jin	Malaysia, Indonesia
Full Plate		Tannishtha Chatterjee	India
Human Resource		Nawapol Thamrongrattanarit	Thailand
In the Land of Arto	Le Pays D'arto	Tamara Stepanyan	France, Armenia
Ky Nam Inn	Quán Kỳ Nam	Leon Le	Vietnam
Love on Trial	恋愛裁判	Koji Fukada	France, Japan
The President's Cake	مملكة القصب	Hasan Hadi	Iraq, Qatar, United States
Raindrops on a Roof		Zhou Jiali	China
Rangga & Cinta		Riri Riza	Indonesia
Renoir	ルノワール	Chie Hayakawa	Japan, Australia, France, Singapore, Philippines, Indonesia
The River That Holds Our Hands	擁啊擁	Chen Jianhang	Hong Kong, Vietnam, South Korea
Sai: Disaster	災 劇場版	Yutaro Seki, Kentaro Hirase	Japan
Sand City		Mahde Hasan	Bangladesh
The Sun Rises on Us All	日挂 終天	Cai Shangjun	China
Whisperings of the Moon		Lai Yuqing	Hong Kong, Cambodia, India

=== Korean Cinema Today - Special Premiere ===
This year, the section will screen five films, including four world premieres.

English title	Original title	Director(s)
Audition 109	오디션109	Jung Woo, Oh Seong-ho
Boss	보스	Ra Hee-chan
The Great Flood	대홍수	Kim Byung-woo
The People Upstairs	윗집 사람들	Ha Jung-woo
Project Y	프로젝트 Y	Lee Hwan

=== Korean Cinema Today - Panorama ===
English title	Original title	Director(s)
My Home	완벽한 집	Jeong Yong-ki
The Old Woman with the Knife	파과	Min Kyu-dong
People and Meat		Yang Jong-hyun
Time of Cinema	극장의 시간들	Lee Jong-pil, Yoon Ga-eun

=== World Cinema ===
English title	Original title	Director(s)	Production country(ies)
Adam's Interest	L'intérêt d'Adam	Laura Wandel	Belgium, France
Don't Let the Sun		Jacqueline Zünd	Switzerland, Italy
Dry Leaf	ხმელი ფოთოლი	Alexandre Koberidze	Germany, Georgia
God Will Not Help	Bog Neće Pomoći	Hana Jušić	Croatia, Italy, Romania, Greece, France, Slovenia
Islands		Jan-Ole Gerster	Germany
Lovely Day	Mille secrets mille dangers	Philippe Falardeau	Canada
Meteors	Météors	Hubert Charuel	France
No Beast. So Fierce.	Kein Tier. So Wild.	Burhan Qurbani	Germany, Poland, France
Phantoms of July	Sehnsucht in Sangerhausen	Julian Radlmaier	Germany
Sound of Falling	In die Sonne schauen	Mascha Schilinski	Germany
Sweetheart	Gioia mia	Margherita Spampinato	Italy
That Summer in Paris	Le rendez-vous de l'été	Valentine Cadic	France
The Blue Trail	O Último Azul	Gabriel Mascaro	Brazil, Mexico, Chile, Netherlands
The Chronology of Water		Kristen Stewart	France, Latvia, United Kingdom, United States
The Currents	Las Corrientes	Milagros Mumenthaler	Argentina, Switzerland
The Great Arch	L’inconnu de la Grande Arche	Stéphane Demoustier	France
The Little Sister	La Petite Dernière	Hafsia Herzi	France, Germany
The Voice of Hind Rajab	صوت هند رجب	Kaouther Ben Hania	Tunisia, France
The Wedding Banquet		Andrew Ahn	United States

=== Flash Forward ===
English title	Original title	Director(s)	Production country(ies)
A Year of School	Un anno di scuola	Laura Samani	Italy, France
Hana Korea		Frederik Sølberg	Denmark, South Korea
Her Will Be Done	Que ma volonté soit faite	Julia Kowalski	France, Poland
I Only Rest in the Storm	O Riso e a Faca	Pedro Pinho	Portugal, Brazil, France, Romania
Lucky Lu		Lloyd Lee Choi	United States, Canada
My Father's Shadow		Akinola Davies Jr.	United Kingdom, Ireland, Nigeria
Omaha	Estrada para o Desconhecido	Cole Webley	United States
Reedland	Rietland	Sven Bresser	Netherlands, Belgium
Strange River	Estrany riu	Jaume Claret Muxart	Spain, Germany
The Last One for the Road	Le città di pianura	Francesco Sossai	Italy, Germany
The Mysterious Gaze of the Flamingo	La misteriosa mirada del flamenco	Diego Céspedes	Chile, France, Germany, Spain, Belgium
Wild Foxes	La danse des renards	Valéry Carnoy	Belgium, France

=== Korean Short Film Competition ===
English title	Original title	Director(s)	Production country(s)
A Man Who Takes Pictures of Flowers	꽃 사진을 찍는 남자	Yoo Lee	United States
Backpike	백파이크	Kim Eun-seo	South Korea
Fadeout Cosmos	사라지는 세계	Lim Jin-hwan	South Korea
In Our Sunset	해질무렵	Kim Soyeon	South Korea
Into The Light	빛 속으로	Lee Nakyung	South Korea
Poetic License / Into The Night	시적허용	Jung Dabin	South Korea
It Sounds Louder On Rainy Days	비 오는 날 소리는 더 크게 들린다	Kim Sang-yun	South Korea
Noise Cancellation	노이즈 캔슬링	Choi Jihye	South Korea
Poetry Syndrome	이상현상	Oh Seyeon	South Korea
The Cheat	포섭	Kim Keon-woo	South Korea
Very Very Strange Love	베리 베리 스트레인지 러브	Song Heesook	South Korea
Yellow Ghost	노란 옷의 유령	Pyun Seokhoon	South Korea

=== Asian Short Film Competition ===
English title	Original title	Director(s)	Production country(s)
Ambush	Kameen	Yassmina Karajah	Jordan, Canada
Delay	远方延误	Wang Han-xuan	China
Fruit	Buah	Jen Nee Lim	Singapore
In the Valley	鳥，飛行中	Lim Han Loong	Malaysia
INTERFACE	幽明の虫	Kawazoe Aya	Japan
karinji	കരിഞ്ഞി	Sheethal N. S.	India
No Island in the Sea	原來海上沒有島	Wang Zhi-xiang	Taiwan
Please P(r)ay Attention	ก้มกราบสามครั้งหลังอาหาร	Vasupol Suwanjuta	Thailand
Rihanna		Suraj Paudel	Nepal
Throughout These Cages	Sekat Sekat	Aaron Pratama	Indonesia

==== Documentary Competition ====
English title	Original title	Director(s)	Production country(s)
10s Across The Borders		Chan Sze-Wei	Philippines, Singapore, Germany
In the Sea of Strange Thoughts	기이한 생각의 바다에서	Choi Jeong-dan	South Korea
Baima Boy		Ye Bingjun	United States, China, France
Habibi Hussein		Alex Bakri	Palestine, Germany,Saudi Arabia, Sweden
Ikaino		Lee Wonsik	South Korea
Panic Button		Samara Sagynbaeva	Kyrgyzstan, Czech Republic
Raining Dust		Ju Romi, Kim Taeil	South Korea
Relay Race		Ko Hyoju	South Korea
Singing Wings		Hemen Khaledi	Iran, Georgia, Belgium
Where We Stay For A While		Wang Mincheol	South Korea

==== Documentary Showcase ====
English title	Original title	Director(s)	Production country(s)
Coexistence, My Ass!		Amber Fares	United States, France
Hair, Paper, Water...	Tóc, Giấy và Nước...	Nicolas Graux and Minh Quý Trương	Belgium, France, Vietnam

=== Open Cinema ===
English title	Original title	Director(s)	Production country(s)
5 Centimeters Per Second	秒速5センチメートル	Yoshiyuki Okuyama	Japan
Arco		Ugo Bienvenu	France
Audition 109	오디션109	Jung Woo, Oh Seong-ho	South Korea
Bring Him Down to a Portable Size	兄を持ち運べるサイズに	Ryōta Nakano	Japan
The Final Piece	盤上の向日葵	Naoto Kumazawa	Japan
The Lovers on the Bridge	Les Amants du Pont-Neuf	Leos Carax	France
Measure in Love	他年她日	Kung Siu Ping	Hong Kong, Taiwan
The Shadow's Edge	捕風追影	Larry Yang	Hong Kong, China

=== Midnight Passion ===
English title	Original title	Director(s)	Production country(s)
Bride of the Covenant	Khế Ước Bán Dâu	Le-Van Kiet	Vietnam
Exit 8	8番出口	Genki Kawamura	Japan
Exterior Night	Esterno notte	Marco Bellocchio	Italy, France
The Furious	火遮眼	Kenji Tanigaki	Hong Kong
Halabala	Halabala: Rừng Ma Tế Xác	Eakasit Thairaat	Thailand
The Holy Boy	La valle dei sorrisi	Paolo Strippoli	Italy, Slovenia
Honey Don't!		Ethan Coen	United States
My Home!		Jeong Yong-ki	South Korea
Protector	Protetora	Adrian Grunberg	United States, South Korea
Weapons		Zach Cregger	United States

=== On Screen ===
This year's line-up features six series—three from South Korea and two from Japan and one from Taiwan. 2 episodes of the series will be screened in this section.

English title	Original title	Director(s)	Production country(ies)	Platform / Network
As You Stood By	당신이 죽였다	Lee Jeong-lim	South Korea	Netflix
Dear X	친애하는 X	Lee Eung-bok and Park So-hyun	South Korea	TVING
Last Samurai Standing	イクサガミ	Michihito Fujii and Kento Yamaguchi	Japan	Netflix
The Murky Stream	탁류	Choo Chang-min	South Korea	Disney+
The Resurrected	回魂計	Chao-jen Hsu and Leste Chen	Taiwan	Netflix
Romantics Anonymous	匿名の恋人たち	Sho Tsukikawa	Japan	Netflix

== Special program in focus ==
=== Our Little History, Please Take Care of Our Future! ===
It showcases five emerging female Korean directors, each selecting a Korean film that significantly influenced their approach to filmmaking.

Year	English title	Original title	Director(s)	Emerging woman director
1998	Art Museum by the Zoo	미술관 옆 동물원	Lee Jeong-hyang	Yoon Ga-eun
2003	Jealousy Is My Middle Name	질투는 나의 힘	Park Chan-ok	Yoon Dan-bi
1999	Memento Mori	여고괴담 두번째 이야기	Kim Tae-yong, Min Kyu-dong	Kim Se-in
2001	Take Care of My Cat	고양이를 부탁해	Jeong Jae-eun	Lim Oh-jeong
2001	Waikiki Brothers	와이키키 브라더스	Yim Soon-rye	Kim Cho-hee

=== Decisive Moments in Asian Cinema ===
As part of the special "Asian Cinema 100" program, the festival will invite masters of Asian cinema to showcase their signature work.

Year	English title	Original title	Director(s)	Production country(ies)
2000	The Day I Became a Woman	روزی که زن شدم	Marzieh Meshkini	Iran
2003	Goodbye, Dragon Inn	不散	Tsai Ming-liang	Taiwan
2003	Oldboy	올드보이	Park Chan-wook	South Korea
2003	Tie Xi Qu: West of the Tracks	鐵西區	Wang Bing	China
2004	Nobody Knows	誰も知らない	Hirokazu Kore-eda	Japan
2005	Election	黑社會	Johnnie To	Hong Kong
2006	Still Life	三峡好人	Jia Zhangke	China
2011	This Is Not a Film	فیلم نیست این	Jafar Panahi, Mojtaba Mirtahmasb	Iran
2018	Burning	버닝	Lee Chang-dong	South Korea, Japan
2021	Drive My Car	ドライブ・マイ・カー	Ryusuke Hamaguchi	Japan

=== 'Carte Blanche' ===
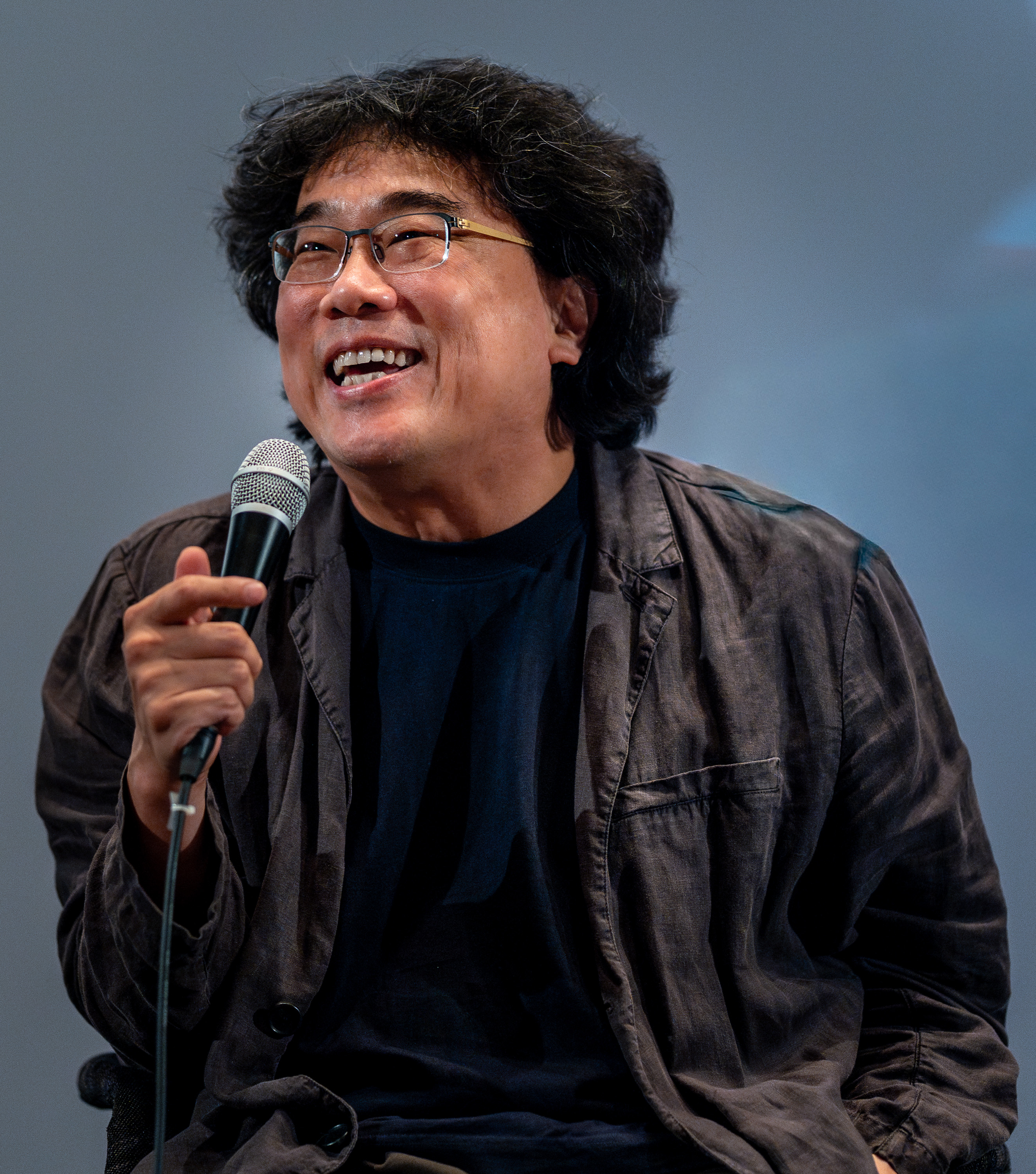
Bong Joon Ho at the festival

The program includes screenings of films selected by notable individuals from the film and cultural sectors, followed by audience discussions featuring their personal experiences and analytical insights.

Year	English title	Original title	Director(s)	Production country	Selected by
2000	Eureka		Shinji Aoyama	Japan	Bong Joon Ho
2006	The Host	괴물	Bong Joon Ho	South Korea	Maggie Kang
2009	Jeon Woo-chi: The Taoist Wizard	전우치	Choi Dong-hoon	South Korea	Gang Dong-won
2022	Small, Slow but Steady	ケイコ 目を澄ませて	Sho Miyake	Japan, France	Eun Heekyung
1975	Dog Day Afternoon		Sidney Lumet	United States	Sohn Suk-hee

=== Special Program in Focus - Marco Bellocchio, the filmmaker who never stopped raising his fist ===
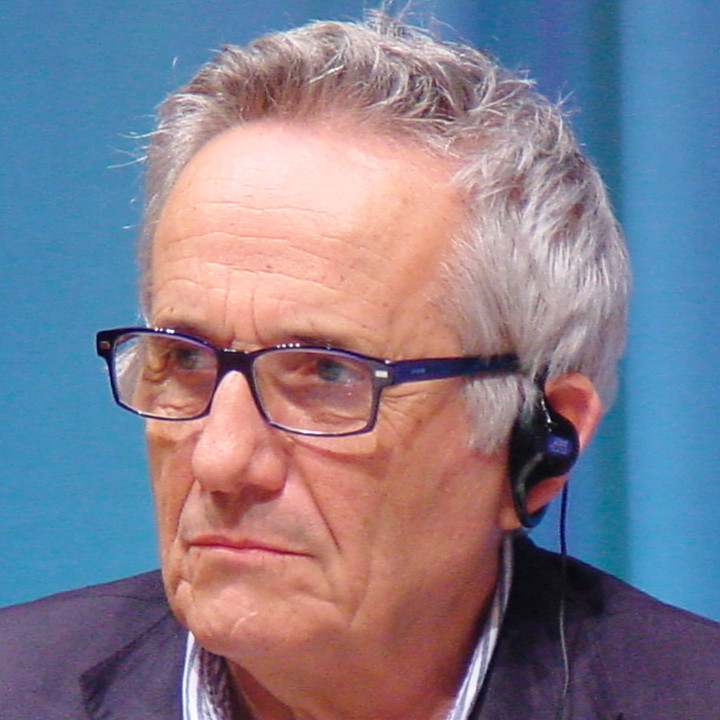
Marco Bellocchio

This year the festival will present the films of Marco Bellocchio, an Italian film director, screenwriter, and actor in a special programme.

Year	English title	Original title	Production country(ies)
1980	A Leap in the Dark	Salto nel vuoto	Italy, France, Germany
1986	Devil in the Flesh	Il diavolo in corpo	Italy
2022	Exterior Night	Esterno notte	Italy, France
1965	Fists in the Pocket	I pugni in tasca	Italy
2003	Good Morning, Night	Buongiorno, notte	Italy
2022	Marx Can Wait	Marx può aspettare	Italy
2025	Portobello (episodes 1 and 2)		Italy, France
2009	Vincere		Italy, France

=== Special Program in Focus - Juliette Binoche, Between Motion and Emotion ===
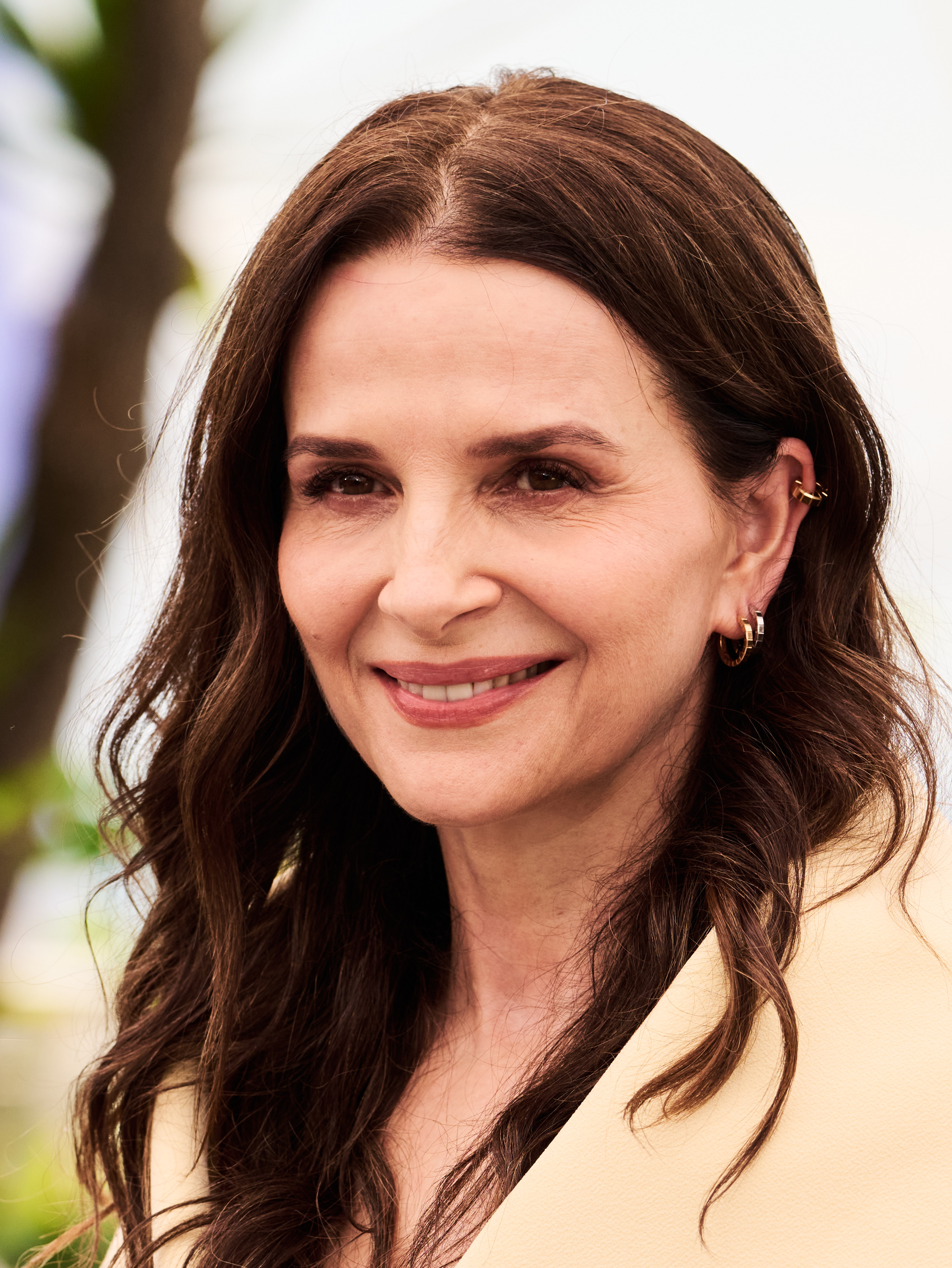
Juliette Binoche in 2025

This year the festival will present the films of the French actress Juliette Binoche in a special programme.

Year	English title	Original title	Director(s)	Production country(ies)
2025	In-I in Motion		Juliette Binoche	France
1991	The Lovers on the Bridge	Les Amants du Pont-Neuf	Leos Carax	France
1993	Three Colours: Blue	Julie Vignon de Courcy	Krzysztof Kieślowski	France, Poland, Switzerland

=== Special Screening ===
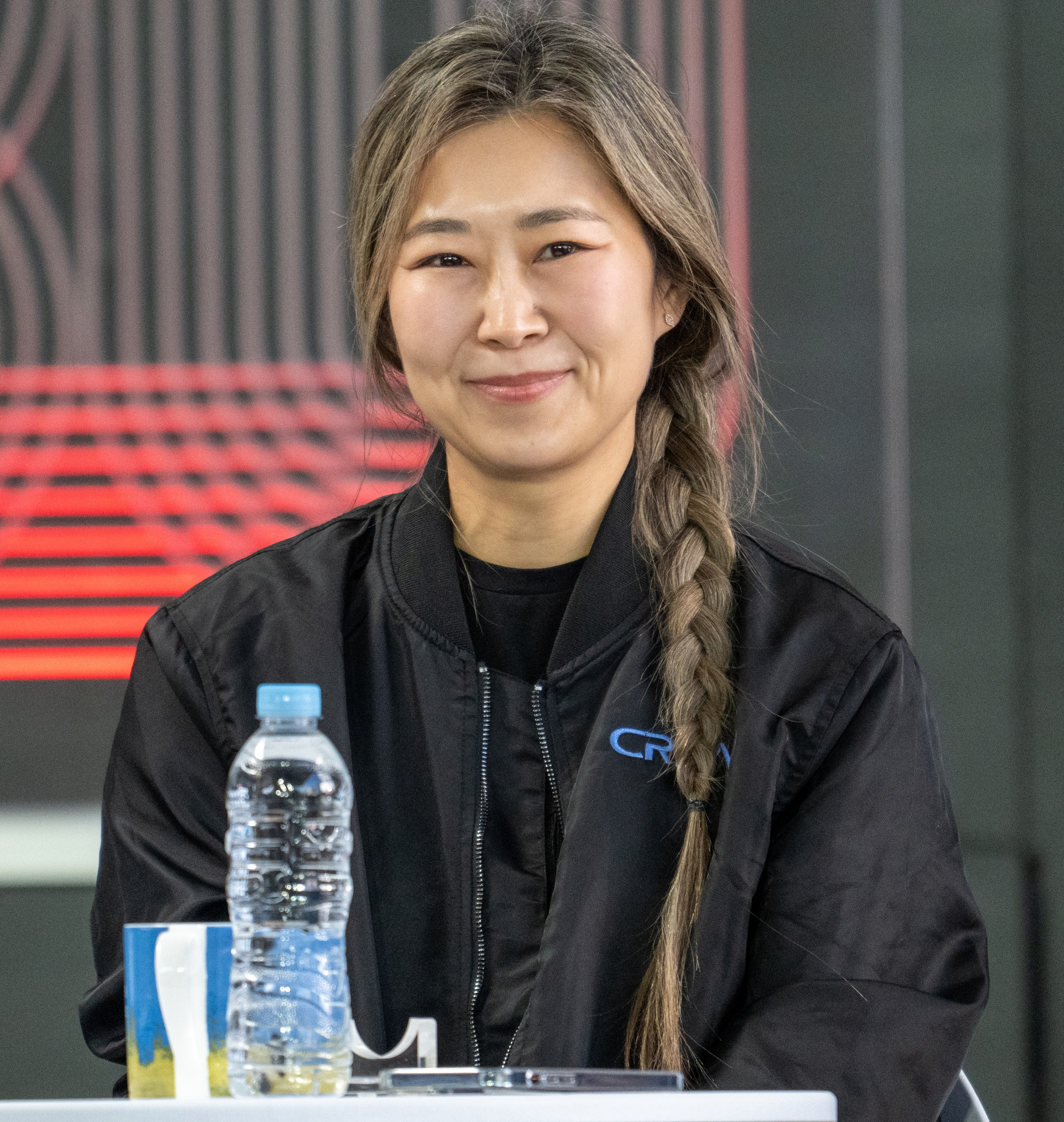
Maggie Kang at the festival

Year	English title	Original title	Director(s)	Production country(ies)
2024	Dancing Village: The Curse Begins	Badarawuhi di Desa Penari	Kimo Stamboel	Indonesia
1995	Heat		Michael Mann	United States
2025	KPop Demon Hunters		Maggie Kang, Chris Appelhans	United States
1994	Life and Death of the Hollywood Kid	헐리우드 키드의 생애	Chung Ji-young	South Korea
2025	Mr. Kim Goes to the Cinema	미스터김, 영화관에 가다	Kim Dong-ho	South Korea

== Awards and winners ==
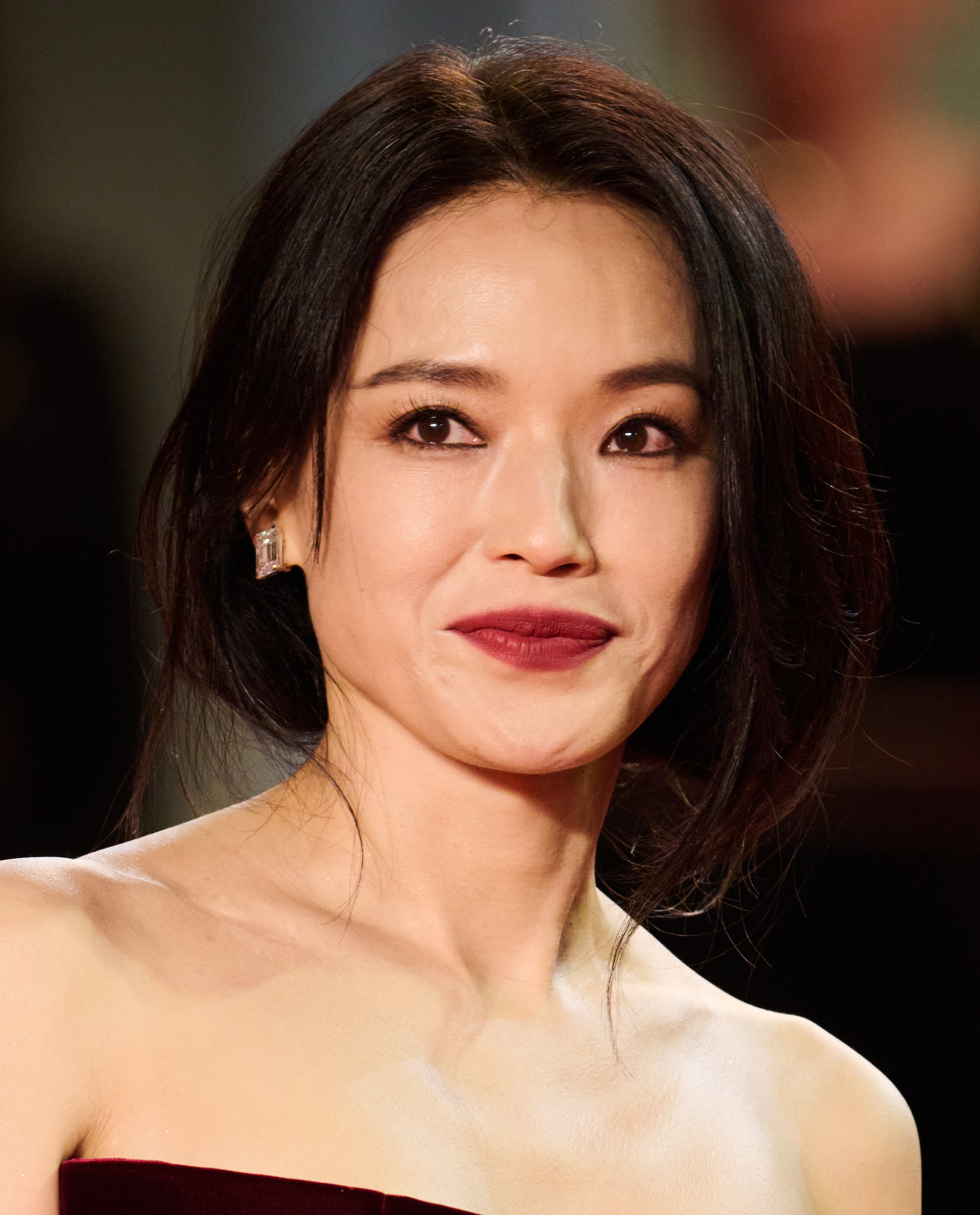
Shu Qi, Best Director Award winner

The following awards were presented at the 30th edition:

=== Busan Awards ===
- Best Film Award: Gloaming in Luomu by Zhang Lü
- Special Jury Award: Han Chang-rok for Funky Freaky Freaks
- Best Director Award: Shu Qi for Girl
- Best Actor Award:
  - Lee Ji-won for En Route To
  - Takumi Kitamura, Ayano Go, Hayashi Yuta for Baka's Identity
- Artistic Contribution Award: Liu Qiang, Tu Nan for Resurrection by Bi Gan
- New Currents Award: En Route To by Yoo Jae-in
- BIFF Mecenat Award:
  - Korea: Raining Dust
  - Asia: Singing Wings
  - Special Mention: Relay Race
- Sonje Award:
  - Korea: It Sounds Louder on Rainy Days
  - Asia: Delay
  - Special Mention: INTERFACE

=== Busan Vision Awards ===
- Actor of the Year:
  - Lee Seung-yeon for The Gorals
  - Moon Woo-jin for The Accordion Door
- Flash Forward Audience Award: Hana Korea by Frederik Sølberg
- KB Vision Audience Award: On Your Lap by Reza Rahadian
- FIPRESCI Award: On Your Lap by Reza Rahadian
- NETPAC Award: Malika by Natalia Uvarova
- CGV Award: Beautiful Dreamer by Lee Kwang-kuk
- DGK PLUS M Award:
  - Coming of Age by Jeong Seung-o
  - Journey There by Kim Jinyu
- KBS Independent Film Award: Journey There by Kim Jinyu
- Critic B Award: The Observer's Journal Lim Jung-hwan
- Songwon Citizen Critic's Award: Coming of Age by Jeong Seung-o
- Hylife Vision Award:
  - Tiger by Anshul Chauhan
  - If on a Winter's Night by Sanju Surendran
- Songwon Vision Award: Shape of Momo by Tribeny Rai
- International Film Festival of India-Vision Asia Award: Black Rabbit, White Rabbit by Shahram Mokri
- Bishkek International Film Festival-Central Asia Union Award: On Your Lap by Reza Rahadian
- Bangladesh July Memorial Prize: Kurak by Erke Dzhumakma Tova, Emil Atageldiev
- Taipei Film Commission Award: Shape of Momo by Tribeny Rai
- Vision of Jiseok Award: Kurak by Erke Dzhumakma Tova, Emil Atageldiev
- Face of the Future Award: On Your Lap by Reza Rahadian
- CINE21 Award: The Accordion Door by Son Kyeong-su
- Busan Cinephile Award: I, Poppy by Vivek Chaudhary
- Documentary Audience Award: Where We Stay For A While by Wang Mincheol

=== Honours ===
- The Asian Filmmaker of the Year
  - Jafar Panahi, Iranian film director, screenwriter, and editor.

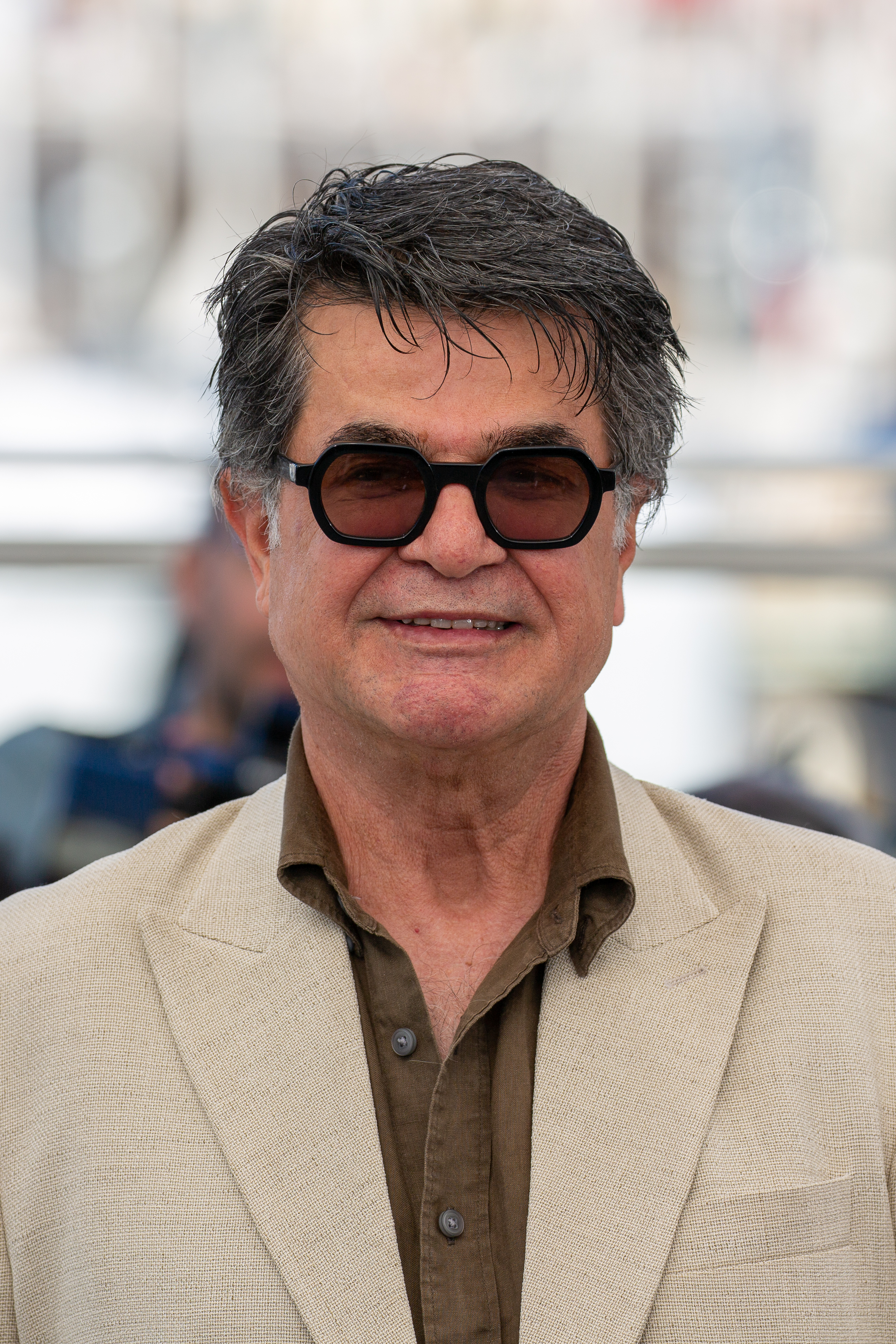
Jafar Panahi recipient of The Asian Filmmaker of the Year award

- Korean Film Achievement Award:
  - Chung Ji-young, South Korean film director and screenwriter.

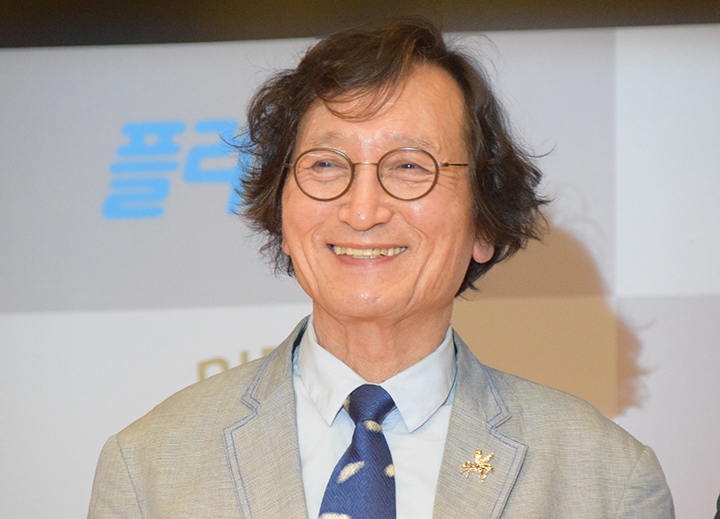
Chung Ji-young recipient of Korean Cinema Award of the Year award

- Camellia Award:
  - Sylvia Chang, Taiwanese actress, singer, director, screenwriter, and producer

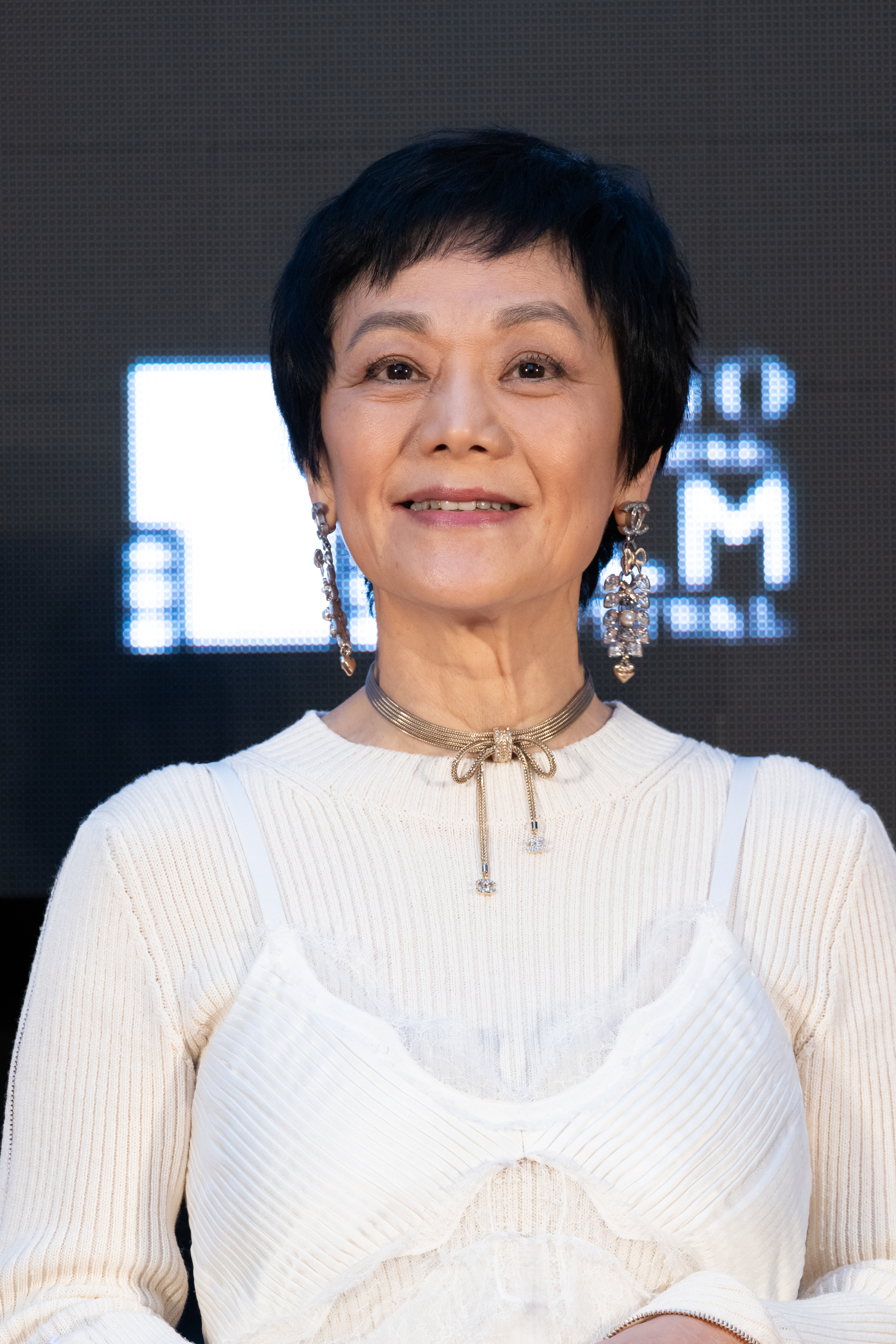
Sylvia Chang recipient of Camellia Award

- BIFF Cinema Master Honorary Award:
  - Marco Bellocchio, Italian film director, screenwriter, and actor
