= Edie & Thea: A Very Long Engagement =

2009 American documentary film

- DVD cover
- Directed by: Susan Muska; Gréta Ólafsdóttir
- Produced by: Susan Muska; Gréta Ólafsdóttir
- Starring: Edith Windsor; Thea Spyer
- Cinematography: Susan Muska; Gréta Ólafsdóttir
- Edited by: Susan Muska; Gréta Ólafsdóttir
- Music by: Karl Henry
- Distributed by: Breaking Glass Pictures
- Release date: June 2009
- Running time: 61 minutes
- Country: United States
- Language: English

Edie & Thea: A Very Long Engagement is a 2009 American documentary film directed and produced by Susan Muska and Gréta Ólafsdóttir for their company Bless Bless Productions, in association with Sundance Channel. The film tells the story of the long-term lesbian relationship between Edie Windsor and Thea Spyer, including their respective childhoods, their meeting in 1963, their lives and careers in New York City, Thea's diagnosis with multiple sclerosis and Edie's care for her partner, and their wedding in Toronto, Canada, in May 2007, because gay marriage was not then legal in their home state of New York.

Upon its initial release, the film was screened primarily at LGBTQ film festivals in 2009 and 2010. The Edie in the film's title was Edith Windsor, who after the death of Thea Spyer on February 5, 2009, was hit with an estate tax bill of $363,053 from the IRS. Had Thea been a man, Edie would have been exempt from this tax due to the marital exception. But the U.S. Defense of Marriage Act (DOMA), which defined marriage as limited to a man and a woman, was in effect at the time. Windsor filed suit against the federal government on November 9, 2010, which ultimately made its way to the Supreme Court of the United States as United States v. Windsor. In June 2013, the Supreme Court upheld the lower court rulings in Windsor's favor and declared that DOMA was unconstitutional.

During the course of the various court cases, the film garnered even more attention and was screened at mainstream film festivals, Jewish film festivals, churches, colleges and universities, libraries, and many other events and locations including a cruise ship. The documentary has also been included as a film resource in scholarly books having to do with sociology or social work, gay marriage, or LGBT families.

The film aired on the Sundance Channel on June 28, 2010, and again on April 25, 2012. It was also included in the Xfinity LGBT History Month programming in October 2017, as a "must-see" documentary.

== Synopsis ==
The film opens with Edie Windsor and Thea Spyer viewing and commenting on photographic slides taken on their travels in the early years of their relationship. In an interview scene, they tell the story of how they first met in 1963 at a New York City restaurant frequented by lesbians. The film cuts to the present (2007), in a swimming pool at their cottage in the Hamptons, with Edie assisting Thea's exercises to help with Thea's multiple sclerosis symptoms. With voice-overs from their interviews, we see them in a park in the present, with Edie walking beside Thea in her wheelchair, describing how they used to dance together at parties when they first met. This pattern of visuals from old still photographs juxtaposed with contemporary footage including interviews, with Thea's physical disability on display, is repeated throughout the film to show the length and depth of their relationship.

They each share biographical information, with Windsor telling her story of growing up in Philadelphia, her brief marriage to a man, and then her move to New York City after their divorce. Spyer tells of her childhood in Amsterdam, her privileged Jewish family's migration to England in 1939 to escape the Nazis, and then emigration to the United States in the early 1940s. Viewers see photos and hear their separate stories of going to college, graduate school, and their early careers during the very closeted 1950s and 1960s. Then each tells her version of the story of how they became romantically involved in The Hamptons in 1965.

They recall how, in 1967, Spyer got down on one knee and proposed to Windsor. Although Windsor was friendly with her colleagues at IBM, she was still closeted at work and so instead of an engagement ring, which would invite questions about her fiancé, Spyer gave her a pin with a circle of diamonds. The two women discuss Spyer's diagnosis in 1977 of multiple sclerosis, and photographs reveal the progression of the disease leading to Spyer using a wheelchair. The film includes footage of the two-hour procedure it took Windsor each night to get Spyer safely into bed. After Spyer was told she had about one year to live, the couple planned a trip to Toronto, Canada, to get married, as same-sex marriage had been previously ruled legal there by the courts. The film includes footage of their civil ceremony held on May 22, 2007. The film ends with Edie and Thea back in New York after the wedding, with Spyer saying she could die now. The closing credits state that Spyer died at home on February 5, 2009.

== Production ==
The feature film took just over two years to complete. The directors were introduced to the subjects by a mutual friend, Brendan Fay from the organization Civil Marriage Trail, shortly before Windsor and Spyer's trip to Canada to be married. Once the directors met the subjects, they said they "saw right away that these women were special and had a unique story". They shot their initial footage on the trip to Canada as well as the wedding ceremony, and then later went back and filled in the backstory with interviews and comments from Windsor and Spyer as they viewed the Kodachrome slides that were primarily taken by Spyer throughout their relationship. The story is presented without any narration or third-party commentary.

The directors' original plan was to create a short film about Windsor and Spyer that they thought would be popular at LGBT film festivals, and inexpensive to produce. They made a trailer for this short film that was seen by someone at the Sundance Channel, who provided funding and persuaded the directors to make a feature-length documentary. It was after the decision was made to scrap the idea of a short film that Windsor and Spyer shared with the directors their extensive collection of photographs, slides, and other memorabilia of their lives separately and together that make up the heart of the film.

== Critical response ==
As of January 2019, there are no reviews or scores collected on Rotten Tomatoes or Metacritic for this film.

Reviews while the film was making its run on the film festival circuit were generally positive. In a review of the film prior to its inclusion in the Washington, D.C., Reel Affirmations Film Festival, the local gay press gave the film 5 out of 5 stars and declared it a Critic's Pick, writing that the film "is a small marvel of documentary filmmaking, pulling you completely into their lives as, after a decades long relationship, they are finally able to marry in Canada". A Durham, North Carolina newspaper wrote of the film prior to its screening as part of the North Carolina Gay & Lesbian Film Festival in August 2010 that it is "more than a love story" and it "is a first person historical record of what it was like to be a lesbian woman in a time when it was not acceptable to be so in public, anywhere in society".

But not all reviews of the film during its festival run were positive. In the Philadelphia Weekly alternative newspaper's reviews of the films included in QFest 2010, reviewer Matt Prigge described the film as "too-pleasant" and stated that it was "too busy being upbeat to truly convey the feeling of being a lesbian in decidedly less understanding times".

After the release of the DVD, which happened a few weeks after Windsor filed her lawsuit against the federal government, more reviews were published and they were also generally positive.

Ms. magazine published a very brief review of the DVD, stating that "The documentary captures the couple's joyfulness" and calls the film "refreshing". In an Austin Chronicle review of the DVD, Julie Gillis wrote "all the opposition's words and supposed logic about the history of marriage and legalities and so forth and so on wind up making no real sense when you see a video like this".

Basil Tsiokos, documentary programming associate for the Sundance Film Festival, reviewed the DVD upon its release and wrote that the directors "craft a loving portrait of these outspoken community activists" and that the film "enters a select group of important non-fiction projects that chronicle the history of LGBT lives that for too long went untold". A review posted to the DVD Talk website states that the film's story "is a gripping, endearing tale of romance and perseverance" and that the film "isn't a politically charged document, but the conclusion paints a vivid picture of the struggle for same-sex unions".

But Richard Propes from The Independent Critic website only gave the film 2.5 out of 4 stars and wrote in 2010 that it is "a genre film that will have limited appeal to a wider audience beyond those who will appreciate the film's heartfelt portrayal of its lesbian relationship and the ways in which Edie & Thea approach the issue of disability within the film".

Shortly before Windsor's case was argued before the U.S. Supreme Court, Gregg Shapiro wrote in Houston's LGBTQ magazine OutSmart that the film is "a substantial argument for same-sex marriage if there ever was one" and that it is "a beautifully rendered story of dancing and romancing, paralleling the couple's own coming-out stories with that of the LGBT community".

In a 2014 review of the DVD, after the Supreme Court ruling in the Windsor case, the gay magazine Out in Jersey stated "This is a lovely documentary, and like Edie and Thea, it is told with grace and dignity".

A review in Library Journal, which helps librarians with purchasing decisions, stated "Eschewing politics or polemics, this documentary presents one of the strongest arguments for gay marriage this reviewer has ever seen" and concluded with "highly recommended". A review in another library journal also recommended the film for both college and public libraries. As of February 2019, the film is held in 336 libraries worldwide.

== Film festival screenings, 2009–2010 ==
The film was initially shown primarily, but not exclusively, at LGBTQ film festivals between 2009 and 2010. The film's directors and occasionally Edie Windsor were present at several of the screenings listed below, which were held prior to Windsor's lawsuit filed in November 2010.

- San Francisco International Lesbian and Gay Film Festival (Frameline) (World premiere: June 21, 2009)
- Outfest Los Angeles (July 2009)
- Reykjavík International Film Festival, Iceland (September 17, 2009)
- Reel Pride Film Festival, Fresno, California (September 20, 2009)
- Pikes Peak Lavender Film Festival, Colorado Springs, Colorado (September 20, 2009)
- Reel Affirmations, Washington, D.C. (October 17, 2009)
- Southwest Gay and Lesbian Film Festival, Albuquerque, New Mexico (October 2009)
- St. Louis International Film Festival (November 15, 2009)
- Savannah Gay & Lesbian Film Society (February 14, 2010)
- Thessaloniki Documentary Festival, Greece (March 18, 2010)
- Melbourne Queer Film Festival, Australia (March 2010)
- Out! For Reel's Lesbian Film Fest, Northampton, Massachusetts (April 16, 2010)
- Out! For Reel: The LGBT Film Series for New England, Northampton, Massachusetts (May 22, 2010)
- Connecticut Gay & Lesbian Film Festival, Hartford, Connecticut (May 29, 2010)
- Fairy Tales Queer Film Festival, Calgary, Alberta, Canada (June 3, 2010)
- QDoc, Portland, Oregon (June 5, 2010)
- Queer Takes: Alt Families Film Festival, Minneapolis, Minnesota (June 10, 2010)
- Provincetown Film Festival, Provincetown, Massachusetts (June 2010)
- Long Island Gay and Lesbian Film Festival, Huntington, New York (July 15, 2010)
- Philadelphia QFest (July 2010)
- North Carolina Gay & Lesbian Film Festival (August 13 and 14, 2010)
- Espoo Ciné International Film Festival, Finland (August 24, 2010)
- Pittsburgh International Lesbian and Gay Film Festival (October 23, 2010)
- Bangalore Queer Film Festival (2010 and 2014)

== Awards and honors ==
The film's official website states that the documentary was the winner of 24 jury and audience awards at film festivals in the United States and internationally.

Specific awards include:

- 2009: Won the Audience Award for Outstanding Documentary Feature Film at Outfest, the Los Angeles LGBT film festival
- 2009: Won both the Jury Award for Best Documentary and the Audience Award for Favorite Documentary at the Seattle Lesbian and Gay Film Festival
- 2009: Won the Jury Prize for Best Documentary at LesGaiCineMad, the Madrid International Gay and Lesbian Film Festival
- 2009: Won the Dokula award for Best Documentary at the Hamburg International Gay and Lesbian Film Festival
- 2009: Won the Audience Award for Best Feature Documentary at Skeive Filme, Oslo Norway
- 2009: Won the Audience Award and Director's Club Award for Best Documentary at Reel Pride Film Festival, Fresno, California
- 2009: Won the Audience Award for Best Independent Feature Documentary at ImageOut: The Rochester Lesbian and Gay Film & Video Festival
- 2009: Won the Audience Award for Best Documentary at Festival internacional de cinema gai i lèsbic de Barcelona (FICGLB), Barcelona Spain
- 2009: Won the Audience Award for Best Documentary at the Southwest Gay and Lesbian Film Festival, Albuquerque, New Mexico
- 2010: Won the Audience Award for Best Documentary and the overall Audience Favorite Film at the Roze Filmdagen, the Amsterdam Gay & Lesbian Film Festival
- 2010: Won the Audience Award for Best Documentary at Internationales Frauen Film Festival, Dortmund/Köln, Germany
- 2010: Won the Audience Award for Best Documentary at the Pink Apple Film Festival, Zürich, Switzerland
- 2010: Won the Audience Award for Best Documentary at the Miami Gay and Lesbian Film Festival
- 2010: Won the Audience Award for Best Documentary at OutFilm, the Connecticut Gay and Lesbian Film Festival
- 2010: Won both the Jury Award and the Audience Award for Best Documentary at the Philadelphia QFest
- 2010: Won the Audience Award for Favorite Documentary at the Pittsburgh International Lesbian & Gay Film Festival
- 2010: Won the Audience Choice Award for Best Documentary at the Melbourne Queer Film Festival, Australia
- 2010: Runner-up for Best Documentary from AARP's Movies for Grownups Awards
- 2011: Won the Audience Award for Best Documentary at the Vues d'en Face in Grenoble, France
- 2011: Won the Publikumspreis (Audience Award) for Best Documentary at the Identities Queer Film Festival in Vienna, Austria
- 2011: Nominated for Outstanding Documentary by GLAAD Media Awards
- 2012: Honorable mention in the LA Weekly list of Top 12 LGBT Movies of all time

== Home media ==
The film was first released on DVD on November 30, 2010, by QC Cinema with distribution by Breaking Glass Pictures.

DVD extra features include an interview with Judge Harvey Brownstone, the first openly gay judge in Canada who performed the marriage ceremony in Toronto, a feature with the film directors and Edie Windsor about the festival circuit, a segment about the film from September 2009 on the PBS TV series In The Life, a "Coping with Disability" featurette, a segment with Windsor entitled "Life After Thea", Windsor's reading of an essay she wrote about Spyer for a writing class, and a photo gallery.
