= Hitman: Agent Jun =

2020 South Korean action comedy film

- Theatrical release poster
- Hangul: 히트맨
- RR: Hiteumaen
- MR: Hit'ŭmaen
- Directed by: Choi Won-sub
- Written by: Choi Won-sub; Shin Joong-ryul
- Produced by: Gu Tae-jin; Jang You-joung
- Starring: Kwon Sang-woo; Jung Joon-ho; Hwang Woo-seul-hye; Lee Yi-kyung; Lee Ji-won
- Cinematography: Park Se-seung
- Edited by: Kim Chang-ju
- Music by: Park Gi-heon
- Production company: Berry Good Studio
- Distributed by: Lotte Cultureworks
- Release date: January 22, 2020
- Running time: 110 minutes
- Country: South Korea
- Language: Korean
- Budget: ₩9 billion
- Box office: US$17.6 million

Hitman: Agent Jun (Korean: 히트맨; RR: Hiteumaen; lit. 'Hitman') is a 2020 South Korean action comedy film directed by Choi Won-sub, starring Kwon Sang-woo, Jung Joon-ho, Hwang Woo-seul-hye, Lee Yi-kyung and Lee Ji-won. It was released on January 22, 2020.

== Plot ==
Jun, a webtoon artist and a worker at a construction site, gets sick about negative comments on his published comics as they were not "fun and entertaining". In a drunken state, Jun draws a webtoon about a secret agent and the webtoon becomes a huge success. It was a very happy moment for Jun's family to finally escape from obscurity, but Jun faces bigger problems as it is revealed that the webtoon is actually based on Jun's life as a secret agent.

Past: Jun, an orphan with excellent fighting and drawing skills, is approached by a person to become a NIS agent. Jun agrees and later became an NIS agent with the title of Elite Assassin. However, Jun's passion for webtoons still remained and usually drew pictures in his spare time, while on duty. Realizing that drawing occasionally was not enough to achieve his true goal, Jun fakes his death by jumping out of a helicopter on a stormy night and disguises himself to achieve his dream as a webtoon artist.

Present: Jun realizes about his family's condition and soon publishes the webtoon's next episode. The NIS agency soon discover that the episode of the webtoon is actually based on a previous top-secret operation, where they realize that Jun is alive. The NIS agents tracks down Jun and interrogates him, but Jun receives a call from his nemesis Jason, who is the antagonist in the second episode, that his wife is held hostage and demands to bring Chief Cheon.

The NIS agents capture Jun's daughter, but Jun's former colleague Cheol escapes with her and heads to Jun's location. Cheol and Chief Cheon teams up with Jun and the trio realize that Jason wants to avenge his brother's death by Jun and Chief Cheon. Jun, Cheol and Chief Cheon tracks down Jason's location, where they finally finishes Jason and his henchmen. Jun is finally proven innocent and lives a peaceful life with his family, where he also begins to write the third episode of the webtoon.

== Cast ==
=== Main ===
- Kwon Sang-woo as Jun
- Jung Joon-ho as Deok-gyu
- Hwang Woo-seul-hye as Mi-na
- Lee Yi-kyung as Cheol
- Lee Ji-won as Ga-young

=== Supporting ===
- Heo Sung-tae as Hyung-do
- Jo Woon as Jason
- Heo Dong-won as Jerome
- Lee Jun-hyeok as Gyu-man
- Lee Joong-ok as Foreman

=== Others ===
- Joo Seo-eun as Eun
- Oh Ja-hoon as Young-joon
- Kim Hee-min as situation room NIS agent
- Choi Yo-han as PC bang boss
- Han Chul-woo as helicopter pilot
- Lee Sang-won as Seong-tae
- Kim Gil-dong as Jason's subordinate
- Bae Jin-woong as Jason's subordinate
- Kim Seon-hyeok as NIS informant
- Park Doo-shik as Simon
- Kim Poong as himself
- Hwang Byung-gook as orphanage director

== Production ==
Principal photography began on May 21, 2019, and filming ended on September 11, 2019.

== Reception ==
The film surpassed 1 million moviegoers five days after its release.

As of May 19, 2020, the film has reached 2,406,232 total admissions grossing $16,814,256 in revenue.

== Sequel ==
The sequel was released on January 22, 2025. Kwon Sang-woo, Jung Joon-ho, Hwang Woo-seul-hye, Lee Yi-kyung, and Lee Ji-won reprised their roles, and are joined by Kim Sung-oh.
