= By Another Name =

By Another Name is a 2025 South Korean independent film directed by Lee Jea-han which follows a young director after he has diagnosed with terminal cancer. It had its world premiere in the competition section of the 2025 Busan International Film Festival (BIFF).

It is Lee’s third feature, with the previous two having played in the BIFF’s Korean Cinema Today section.
