= Harvey Brownstone =

Canadian judge

The Honourable Mr. Justice Harvey Brownstone
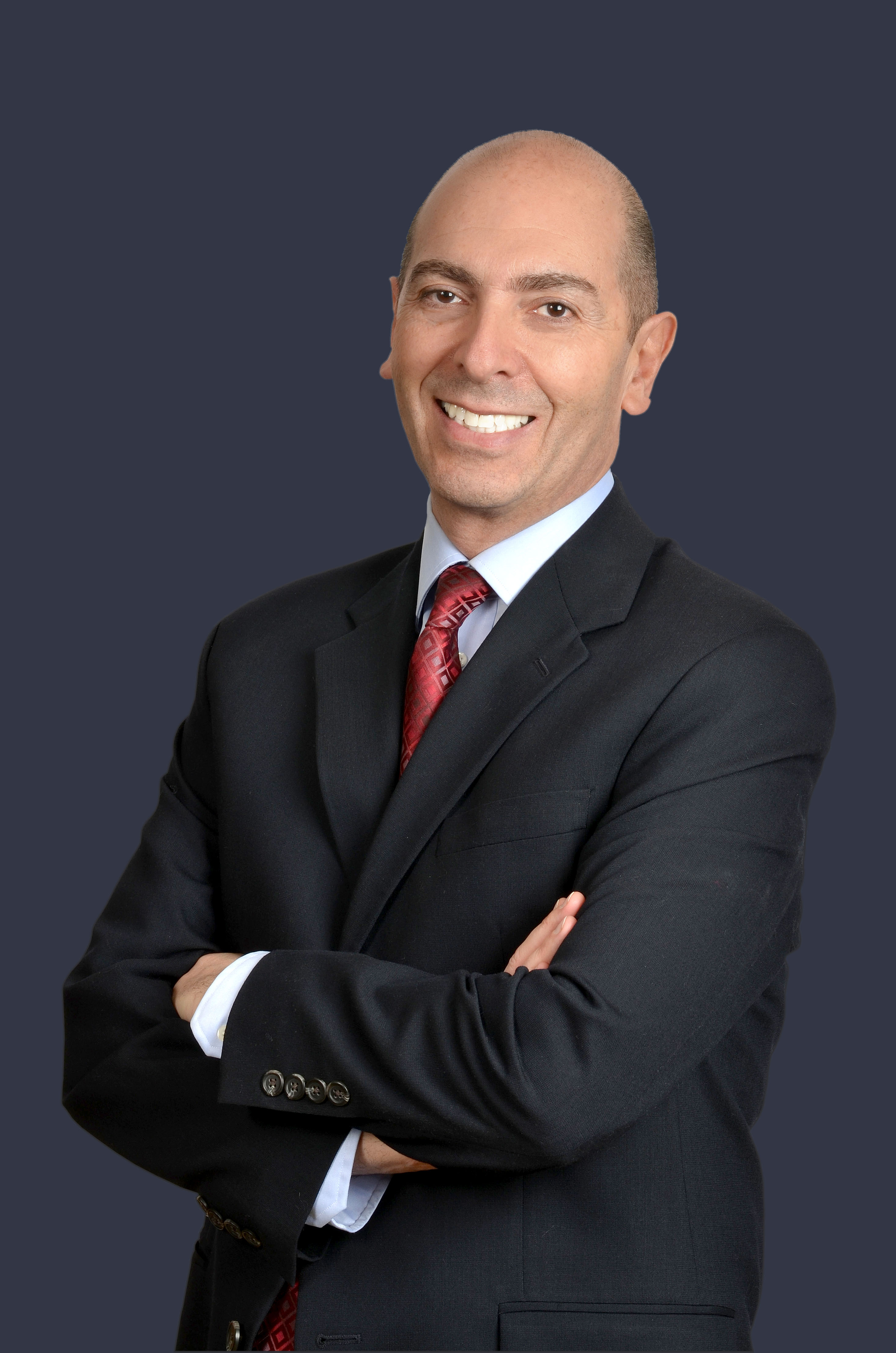

Judge of the Ontario Court of Justice
- In office March 13, 1995 – December 31, 2021

Personal details
- Born: July 24, 1956 (age 70) Paris, France
- Education: Queen's University
- Occupation: Retired judge, talk show host, author
- Website: harveybrownstoneinterviews.com

Harvey Brownstone (born July 24, 1956) is a retired lawyer and judge of the Ontario Court of Justice, and the first openly gay judge in Canada. He is also a bestselling author and host of an internet talk show. His first book, Tug of War: A Judge's Verdict on Separation, Custody Battles and the Bitter Realities of Family Court, was published by ECW Press in 2009. His memoir, Without Prejudice: My Life as a Gay Judge, was published by ECW Press in May 2026. A feature film directed by Shane Stanley and based on the memoir is scheduled for release in 2027.

== Early life and education ==
Brownstone was born on July 24, 1956, in Paris, France. After his mother split from his birth father, they relocated to Hamilton, Ontario.

His adoptive father, Sam Brownstone, was the director of the Hamilton Jewish Community Centre for many years. His mother, Odette Brownstone, was a French-Algerian Holocaust survivor and owned "Odette de Paris", a French womenswear business.

Brownstone experienced severe bullying beginning in the fourth grade. Brownstone attended Adelaide Hoodless Elementary School and Scott Park Secondary School.

At age 19, during his first year at university, he came out as gay to his parents and was forced to leave his family home. Following his departure from home, Brownstone relied on social assistance for five years.

He received his LL.B. degree from Queen's University in Kingston, Ontario, in 1980. He was called to the Bar of Ontario in 1983 after articling with criminal lawyers Leo Adler and William A. Gorewich.

== Legal career ==
After graduating from Queen's University's Faculty of Law, Brownstone worked as a legal aid duty counsel lawyer in Toronto from 1983 to 1985, before entering private practice in criminal law. In 1987, he joined the Research Facility of the Ontario Legal Aid Plan, as the head of the Family Law section.

In 1989, Brownstone joined the Ministry of the Attorney General's Support and Custody Enforcement Branch as counsel, rising to legal director in 1991 and director of the entire program in 1992. During his tenure, the program implemented child and spousal support enforcement mechanisms, including support deduction orders, also known as automatic wage deduction, and the suspension of driver's licenses for defaulting payors. These enforcement tools were the first of their kind in a Canadian jurisdiction.

Brownstone served on the Mayor of Toronto's Committee on Community and Race Relations from 1990 to 1993, and chaired the first Subcommittee on Gay Issues. This appointment was featured as the cover story in the October 11, 1991 issue of Xtra Magazine.

== Judicial career ==
Brownstone was appointed a judge of the Ontario Court of Justice on March 13, 1995. He became the first openly gay judge in Canada. Brownstone presided in both criminal court and family court.

From April 4, 1995 until October 15, 2018, he was the only provincial judge in the Toronto region who heard family court cases in both English and French.

From 1999 to 2001, Brownstone served as Local Administrative Judge of the Toronto Metro West Family Court, before transferring to the Toronto North Family Court and working there from 2001 to 2012. In 2006, he advocated for the Court Services Division of the Ministry of the Attorney General to hire a full-time staff mediator at the Family Court. Brownstone began presiding exclusively in criminal court in December 2013, and transferred to the Niagara criminal court in 2019.

Brownstone was on the Board of Directors of the Ontario Family Law Judges Association from 1995 to 1999, and on the Board of Directors of the Ontario Conference of Judges from 1999 to 2002. He was a member of the Ontario Family Rules Committee from 1991 to 1994 and again from 1999 to 2011.

== Community advocacy and recognition ==
In 1997, Brownstone gave a speech at the University of Toronto Faculty of Law about self-represented litigants appearing in Family Court, urging the Law School and legal community to provide services to these clients. This speech inspired the creation of Pro Bono Students Canada's Family Law Project, which now provides assistance to self-represented litigants in Family Courts throughout Canada. Brownstone is regularly called upon to speak at events organized by Pro Bono Students Canada. On May 13, 2016 Brownstone was presented with a Pro Bono Students Canada Supporter Award at the organization's 20th-anniversary gala dinner held at the Law Society of Upper Canada's Convocation Hall.

On June 14, 2008, at New York City Hall, Brownstone was presented with a proclamation signed by New York State Senator Thomas Duane in recognition of Brownstone's role in having officiated at hundreds of same-sex weddings for New York citizens who travelled to Toronto to get married.

In August 2010, Brownstone received the Colleague in the Spotlight award from the Canadian Bar Association Judges' Forum.

The following year, he contributed a chapter highlighting Ontario's case management system to a book entitled Innovations for Self-Represented Litigants published in the United States by the Association of Family and Conciliation Courts. His commentary on the family justice system has been cited in relation to subsequent reforms enacted by the Attorney General.

In 2015, Brownstone was a candidate for the position of Chief Justice of the Ontario Court of Justice, a role that was ultimately awarded to Lise T. Maisonneuve. National Post journalist Christie Blatchford described a "judicial smear campaign" aimed at derailing Brownstone's candidacy. Following his retirement from the judiciary, Brownstone publicly criticized the recruitment and selection process for the position in a December 2022 media interview describing it as "a fiasco".

== Retirement from the judiciary ==
Brownstone retired from the judiciary in December 2021 to devote his full attention to his online talk show, Harvey Brownstone Interviews.

Following his retirement from the judiciary, Brownstone wrote a memoir in which he criticized aspects of the Canadian family and criminal justice systems. He has also been critical of the judiciary's toxic culture of "institutional inertia" and misplaced priorities, arguing that some judges focus on career advancement rather than actively resolving problems for litigants appearing before them.

Brownstone is the recipient of two Distinguished Alumni Awards from Queen's University Faculty of Law, making him the only alumnus of Queen's University Law School to receive two Distinguished Alumni Awards.

== LGBTQ2+ advocacy ==
In 2007, Brownstone officiated the marriage of Edith Windsor and Thea Spyer in Toronto, a marriage which triggered the constitutional litigation at the United States Supreme Court regarding same-sex marriage (United States v. Windsor). He has been recognized for playing an instrumental role in raising Canada's profile in the evolution of marriage equality law in the United States.

Brownstone reflected on his experiences as Canada's first openly gay judge and his role in the legal evolution of same-sex marriage in a chapter of LGBTQ2+ Law: Practice Issues and Analysis (Emond Publishing, 2019).

On June 5, 2023, Brownstone was chosen to officially launch Pride Month in New York City with a special event at the Stonewall Inn.

== Media and books ==
Although judges rarely speak publicly about their work or engage with the media, Brownstone was a notable exception to this norm. His media appearances and public outreach made him prominent within the Canadian justice system. Legal commentators have described him as a pioneer in shifting the public image of the judiciary. Brownstone frequently speaks at universities and legal conferences, often focusing on public education regarding divorce and family law. Following an appearance on the CBC Radio program Out in the Open, his interview received widespread engagement. In October 2020, Brownstone hosted, Examination in Chief, a 5-part podcast series exploring the relationship between the criminal justice system and the LGBTQ2+ community.

=== Harvey Brownstone Interviews ===
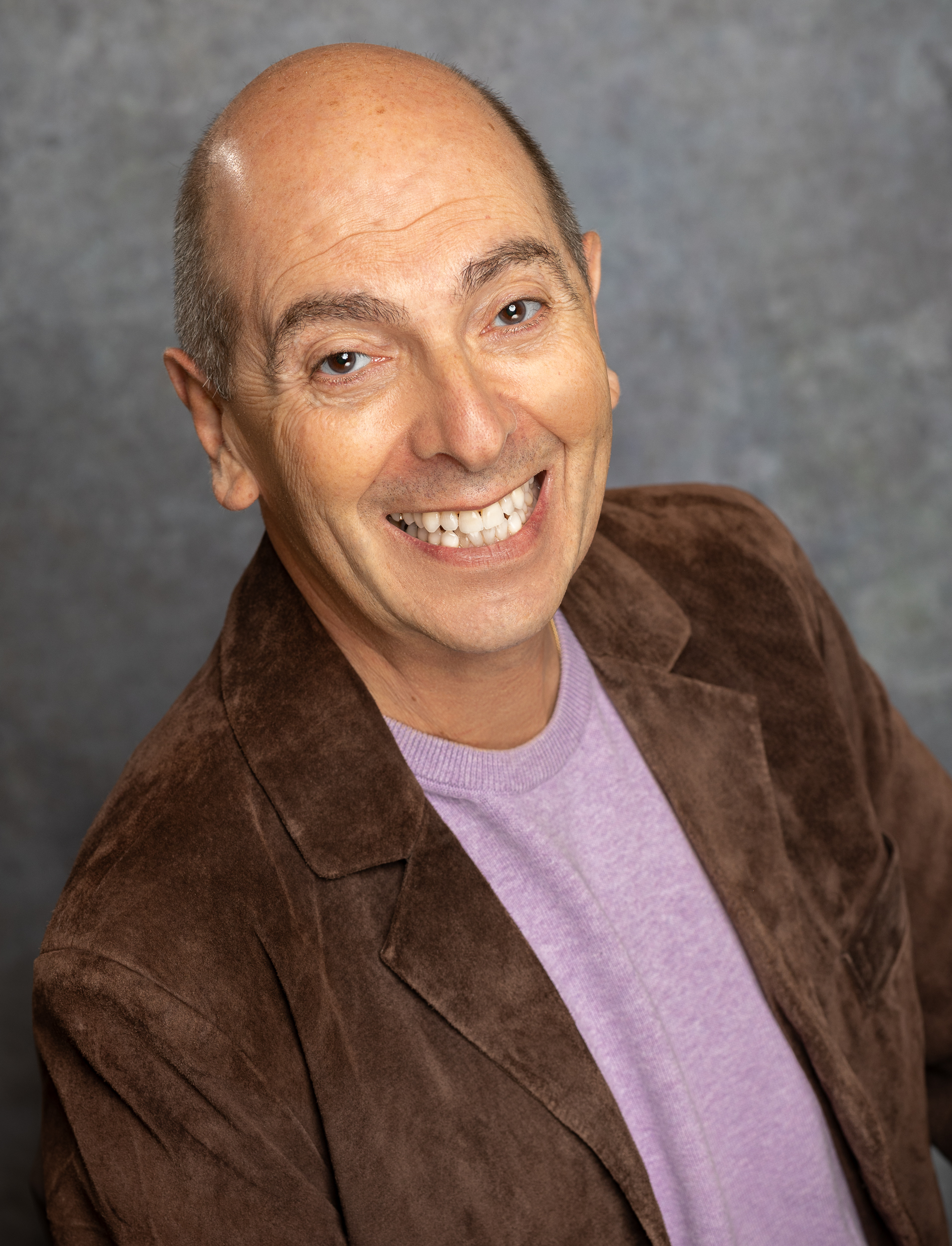
Photo by Dan Lane Williams, New York

In 2021, Brownstone launched Harvey Brownstone Interviews, an online talk show featuring interviews with notable individuals. It is broadcast via Youtube and podcast apps, is and televised on XPTV1 in the United Kingdom. Notable guests on his program include Robert Wagner, Louis Gossett Jr., Tim Rice, Ann-Margret, William H. Macy, and Tina Sinatra. He has interviewed the children of cinematic legends including Errol Flynn, Orson Welles, Hedy Lamarr, Boris Karloff, and John Garfield.

Brownstone has appeared as a guest on podcasts, television shows, and media print articles.

=== Without Prejudice: My Life as a Gay Judge ===
Brownstone's memoir, Without Prejudice: My Life as a Gay Judge, published by ECW Press, was released on May 26, 2026. The book, which has been described as "an unfiltered reckoning with the family and criminal courts, and the judiciary that runs them", became a national bestseller on June 11, 2026, and is the subject of a feature film directed by Shane Stanley scheduled for release in 2027. The film has won eight Accolade Global Film Awards.

=== Tug of War ===
Brownstone serves as a commentator on family law and divorce issues in the Canadian national media. He authored the book Tug of War, examining family law and divorce. The publication received endorsements from members of the Canadian and American judiciary, including a cover blurb from retired Supreme Court of Canada Justice Claire L'Heureux-Dubé.

The book has been cited internationally by legal academics and jurists. In the United Kingdom, commentators advocating for multidisciplinary training in social work and mediation for legal professionals have referenced Tug of War to support integrated approaches to family law education. All the royalties from the book are donated directly to the Children's Wish Foundation of Canada.

=== Family Matters ===
In 2010, Brownstone hosted an online talk show, Family Matters with Justice Harvey Brownstone, making him the first sitting Canadian judge to host a talk show. The initial eight-episode season was distributed online and focused on foundational family law topics, including child support, mediation, and prenuptial agreements.

In September 2011, Family Matters transitioned into a television show, broadcasting 15 episodes on CHCH TV and other independent Canadian TV stations, in addition to being available online. The television format addressed broader social and legal issues, such as domestic violence, parental alienation, and grandparents' rights. It often featured guest appearances from Canadian lawyers and provincial judges.

A 16-episode second season was filmed in Toronto and Victoria, and was released in May 2013 on CHEK TV and CHCH TV. The second season introduced a viewer question-and-answer segment and covered topics ranging from high-conflict divorce to estate planning.

All episodes of the series continue to be available on YouTube. Brownstone participated in the production without financial remuneration, covering his own travel and accommodation expenses.

=== Edie & Thea: A Very Long Engagement ===
Brownstone has spoken publicly and written about the role he played in officiating Edith Windsor and Thea Spyer's historic marriage. In Edith Windsor's autobiography, published posthumously, she writes about the impact of having Brownstone officiate at her wedding. Brownstone was featured in the critically acclaimed documentary Edie & Thea: A Very Long Engagement.

Windsor, at age 85, made a return trip to Toronto to celebrate WorldPride, and was cited by Brownstone as "the Rosa Parks of the gay rights movement". Brownstone and Windsor made an appearance together on CTV's Canada AM and gave a joint presentation at the WorldPride International Human Rights Conference on June 25, 2014.

== Personal life ==
In 2019, Brownstone moved to Niagara Falls, Ontario, after living in Toronto for 40 years. As of 2010, Brownstone was married and had been with his partner for 25 years.

== Awards and honours ==
- 2002: Queen Elizabeth II Golden Jubilee Medal
- 2008: Xtra Award for Best Behind-the-Scenes Champion
- 2008: New York State Senate Proclamation
- 2010: Canadian Bar Association Judges' Forum Colleague in the Spotlight Award
- 2016: Queen's University Faculty of Law Justice Thomas Cromwell Distinguished Public Service Award
- 2024: Queen's University Faculty of Law J.A. Corry Distinguished Alumni Award

== Published works ==
- Tug of War: A Judge's Verdict on Separation, Custody Battles and the Bitter Realities of Family Court (ECW Press, 2009).
- "The Homosexual Parent in Custody Disputes", Queen's Law Journal, vol. 5, no. 2.
- Without Prejudice: My Life as a Gay Judge (ECW Press, 2026).
