= Gloaming in Luomu =

2025 Chinese drama film

- Promotional poster
- Simplified Chinese: 罗目的黄昏
- Literal meaning: Luo Mu's dusk
- Directed by: Zhang Lü
- Screenplay by: Zhang Lü
- Produced by: Peng Jin
- Starring: Bai Baihe; Liu Dan; Huang Jianxin
- Cinematography: Piao Songri
- Edited by: Liu Xinzhu
- Production company: Chengdu Lu Films Co. Ltd.
- Release date: 21 September 2025 (Busan)
- Running time: 99 minutes
- Country: China
- Language: Mandarin

Gloaming in Luomu (Chinese: 罗目的黄昏) is a 2025 Chinese drama film written and directed by Korean-Chinese filmmaker Zhang Lü and stars Bai Baihe, Huang Jianxin and Liu Dan. The film follows a dancer Xiaobai, who after receiving a postcard from her boyfriend, who left without saying goodbye three years ago, travels to the town of Luomu to find out the reason.

It had its world premiere at the 30th Busan International Film Festival in Competition on 21 September 2025, where it won Busan Award for the best film.

== Synopsis ==
Xiao Bai comes to the small town of Luomu, carrying an old postcard from her ex-boyfriend Wang that says 'Gloaming in Luomu.' As she explores the town with the postcard, she finds signs of Wang in different spots. She hopes for a peaceful, short visit, but things change quickly when she meets locals and guests, such as Liu, the wine-loving guesthouse owner, Liu’s boyfriend Huang, and her fun-loving friend Peng.

== Cast ==
- Bai Baihe as Xiaobai
- Liu Dan as Sister Liu
- Huang Jianxin as Old Huang
- Wang Chuanjun

== Production ==
The film was shot in the locations at Luomu Town, on the rear part of the foothills of Mount Emei.

== Release ==
Gloaming in Luomu competed in the Competition section of the 30th Busan International Film Festival on 21 September 2025 for 'Busan Awards'.

It was presented in 'From The Festivals - 2025' section of the 56th International Film Festival of India in November 2025.

== Accolades ==
The film competed for various Vision Awards at Busan International Film Festival.

Award	Date of ceremony	Category	Recipient(s)	Result	Ref.
Busan International Film Festival	September 26, 2025	Busan Awards: Best Film	Gloaming in Luomu	Won	
