= Leave the Cat Alone =

- Directed by: Daisuke Shigaya
- Written by: Daisuke Shigaya
- Produced by: Hiro Itaya
- Starring: Soma Fujii, Yukino Murakami, Ran Taniguchi, Meiry Mochizuki, Naoyuki Miyahara, Daikichi Sugawara, Shinsuke Kato, Kei Sato, Gai-gai Dada, Konosuke Furuya
- Cinematography: Ryo Hirai, Fumiya Mishiro
- Edited by: Takahiro Sakata
- Music by: Soma Fujii
- Production company: HUT Pictures Inc.
- Release date: September 20, 2025
- Country: Japan

Leave the Cat Alone is a 2025 Japanese film directed by Daisuke Shigaya. It had its world premiere at the 2025 Busan International Film Festival in the first official competition section.

The film was cited by festival director Jung Hanseok, as an example of a movie which gained a sales agent after it was announced as a film in competition at Busan.

== Plot ==
Mori, a musician with lethargy and insomnia, is unable to find inspiration in creating music. At the same time, his relationship with his wife, Maiko, a successful and driven photographer, is filled with unease. After a chance encounter with his former lover, Asako, the two confront diverging accounts of their past memories. Asako returns to her partner with new inspiration for her paintings, while Mori goes to Maiko's exhibition and discovers himself captured within her photographs. The entire story takes place over the course of three days and two nights.

== Cast ==
- Soma Fujii as Mori
- Yukino Murakami as Asako
- Ran Taniguchi as Maiko
- Meiry Mochizuki as Chika

== Production ==
Leave the Cat Alone is the debut feature film from writer and director Daisuke Shigaya, who has previously won awards for his short films. Shigaya had originally began work on the film seven years prior to its release, planning to work on it as a self-produced feature. This was before Hiro Itaya of HUT Pictures became attached, with leads Fujii and Taniguchi joining in 2024.

Musician Soma Fujii, who portrays Mori, also provides the music for the film.

Nikkatsu secured the international sales rights to the film ahead of its world premiere at BIFF. The film will be distributed in Japan by Iha Films.

== Release ==
The film premiered on September 20, 2025 in the inaugural competition section at the Busan International Film Festival.

== Reception ==
Wendy Ide of ScreenDaily opines “This is subdued, introspective filmmaking which sidesteps moments of emphatic drama and finality to focus on the quiet storms of domestic life.” She notes “It’s an assured, if deliberately understated debut feature from director Daisuke Shigaya.”

Clarence Tsui of The Film Verdict writes, “Understated in its aesthetics but surprisingly sturdy in its emotional depth, the film will certainly resonate with millennials struggling with their hopes of nurturing sweet love, slow lives and sublime literary pursuits.” Tsui also notes, “Steering clear of melodrama, Shigaya has delivered a poised and poetic exploration about how one creates – not just works of art, but also a matching mindset which might stimulate creativity in the most mundane of circumstances.”
