= Another Birth =

- Directed by: Isabelle Kalandar
- Written by: Isabelle Kalandar
- Produced by: Isabelle Kalandar, Shahnoz Eronshoh
- Starring: Shukrona Navruzbekova, Isabelle Kalandar, Shoira Abdulgaezkhonova
- Cinematography: Janis Brod, Vladmir Usoltsev
- Edited by: Kseniia Filippova, Aleksei Reidel
- Music by: Noah K, Rosie K
- Release date: 2025
- Running time: 66 minutes
- Countries: Tajikistan; United States; Qatar
- Language: Tajik

Another Birth is a 2025 film directed by Isabelle Kalandar which follows the life of an eight-year-old girl with an absent father in Tajikistan. It had its world premier in the competition section of the 2025 Busan International Film Festival.

== Premise ==
The film is not plot-driven, instead pairing vignettes with the work of Iranian poet Forugh Farrokhzad, whose verses are recited by the cast both on and off-screen. The title of the movie is taken from a line of poetry by Farrokhzad and alludes to the opening scene of the film, where a woman is seen going through a painful childbirth from the vantage point of the young girl, Parastu.

== Plot ==
The film takes place in a rural village in the mountains of Badakhshan. It follows the journey of Parastu, portrayed as a mature and sensitive eight-year-old girl. This is also a reference to Farrokhzad, in which her poem ‘Age Seven’, refers to that point of a child's life as “a magnanimous moment of departure.”

Parastu approaches this turning point in her life when she believes her ailing grandfather, Bobo Ali, is suffering because of his longing for his missing son. While her mother is apathetic to her concerns, Parastu continues to worry about her grandfather's condition. This leads to her setting out to find her father with her best friend, Guliston, to look for a mythical spirit, Pari. This is for the hope that the spirit could help bring her father, whom she has never met, home. Together with Guliston, the two children travel across rugged mountain terrain, encountering a fairy, a sage man, gravestones, and rivers with spirits.

== Cast ==
- Shukrona Navruzbekova as Parastu
- Isabella Kalandar as Parvin, Parastu's mother
- Shoira Abdulgaezkhonova as Guliston

== Production ==
The film is categorized as a Tajikistan, U.S. and Qatar coproduction. It was backed by the Doha Film Institute and produced by Kalandar and Shahnoz Eronshoh.

It is the first of the “On Exile” trilogy by Kalandar. The second and third episodes are tentative titled Still We Must Live and When Soft Voices Die.

== Reception ==
In a positive review, Amber Wilkinson of ScreenDaily wrote “This drama is likely to find an audience with those who favour quiet contemplation over plot development and is elevated by careful framing and a strong sense of place.” Wilkinson noted that the director created striking visuals and that while the film contains an inherent sadness, Kalandar “also captures the hopeful determination of her young protagonist” and resilience.
