= Baka's Identity =

- Film poster
- Japanese: 愚か者の身分
- Directed by: Koto Nagata
- Screenplay by: Kosuke Mukai
- Based on: Orokamono no Mibun by Jun Nishio
- Produced by: Akira Morii; Kumi Kobata; Kazuya Shimomura
- Starring: Takumi Kitamura; Yuta Hayashi; Go Ayano
- Cinematography: Tomoo Ezaki
- Edited by: Ryūji Miyajima
- Music by: Yoshiaki Dewa
- Production companies: The Seven; Lat-Lon
- Distributed by: The Seven; Showgate
- Release date: October 24, 2025 (Japan)
- Running time: 130 minutes
- Country: Japan
- Language: Japanese

Baka's Identity is a 2025 Japanese crime film directed by Koto Nagata and written by Kosuke Mukai, based on Jun Nishio's 2019 novel Orokamono no Mibun. The plot explores Japanese youth poverty in criminal underworld through the perspectives of a trio of young men who work as internet scammers.

The film premiered at the 2025 Busan International Film Festival in competition and was theatrically released in Japan on October 24, 2025.

== Premise ==
The movie stars Takumi Kitamura, Go Ayano, and Yuta Hayashi as three young men who make a living by pretending to be young women and tricking men out of their identity papers that they can resell to others trying to establish a new life.

Mamoru (Yuta Hayashi) and Takuya (Kitamura) as a pair chat up young men online, while sending in their female associate (Mizuka Yamashita) to convince men to sell their identities to “her”. The three work under their boss Sato (Goichi Mine). The film tracks the descent of the three protagonists as they fool others and are scammed themselves.

“Baka” is the Japanese word for idiot or fool, referring to the victims of the trio's Internet scams.

== Cast ==
- Takumi Kitamura as Takuya Matsumoto
- Yuta Hayashi as Mamoru Kakizaki
- Mizuki Yamashita as Kisara Makihara
- Yuma Yamoto as Haruto Egawa (Yuto Taniguchi)
- Haruka Kinami as Yuika
- Kazuya Tanabe as George (Joji Ichioka)
- Goichi Mine as Sato
- Masaki Kaji as Kaizuka
- Yuya Matsuura as Toshio Maeda (Todoroki)
- Go Ayano as Kenshi Kajitani

== Development ==
Jun's 2019 novel, which told the story of youth in Tokyo's Kabukicho red light district, was a sprawling narrative with numerous interconnected characters. Nagata and screenwriter Kosuke Muka chose to focus the script on three characters.

== Accolades ==
Award	Category	Recipient(s)	Result	Ref.
30th Busan International Film Festival	Busan Award for Best Film	Baka's Identity	Nominated	
30th Busan International Film Festival	Busan Award for Best Actor	Takumi Kitamura	Won	
30th Busan International Film Festival	Busan Award for Best Actor	Yuta Hayashi	Won	
30th Busan International Film Festival	Busan Award for Best Actor	Go Ayano	Won	
47th Yokohama Film Festival	Best Newcomer	Yuta Hayashi	Won	
38th Nikkan Sports Film Awards	Best Actor	Takumi Kitamura	Nominated	
38th Nikkan Sports Film Awards	Best Newcomer	Yuta Hayashi	Won	
80th Mainichi Film Awards	Best Newcomer	Yuta Hayashi	Won	
80th Mainichi Film Awards	Best Screenplay	Kosuke Mukai	Nominated	
68th Blue Ribbon Awards	Best Actor	Takumi Kitamura	Nominated	
