= Lee Ji-won =

South Korean actress (born 2001)

Lee Jiwon
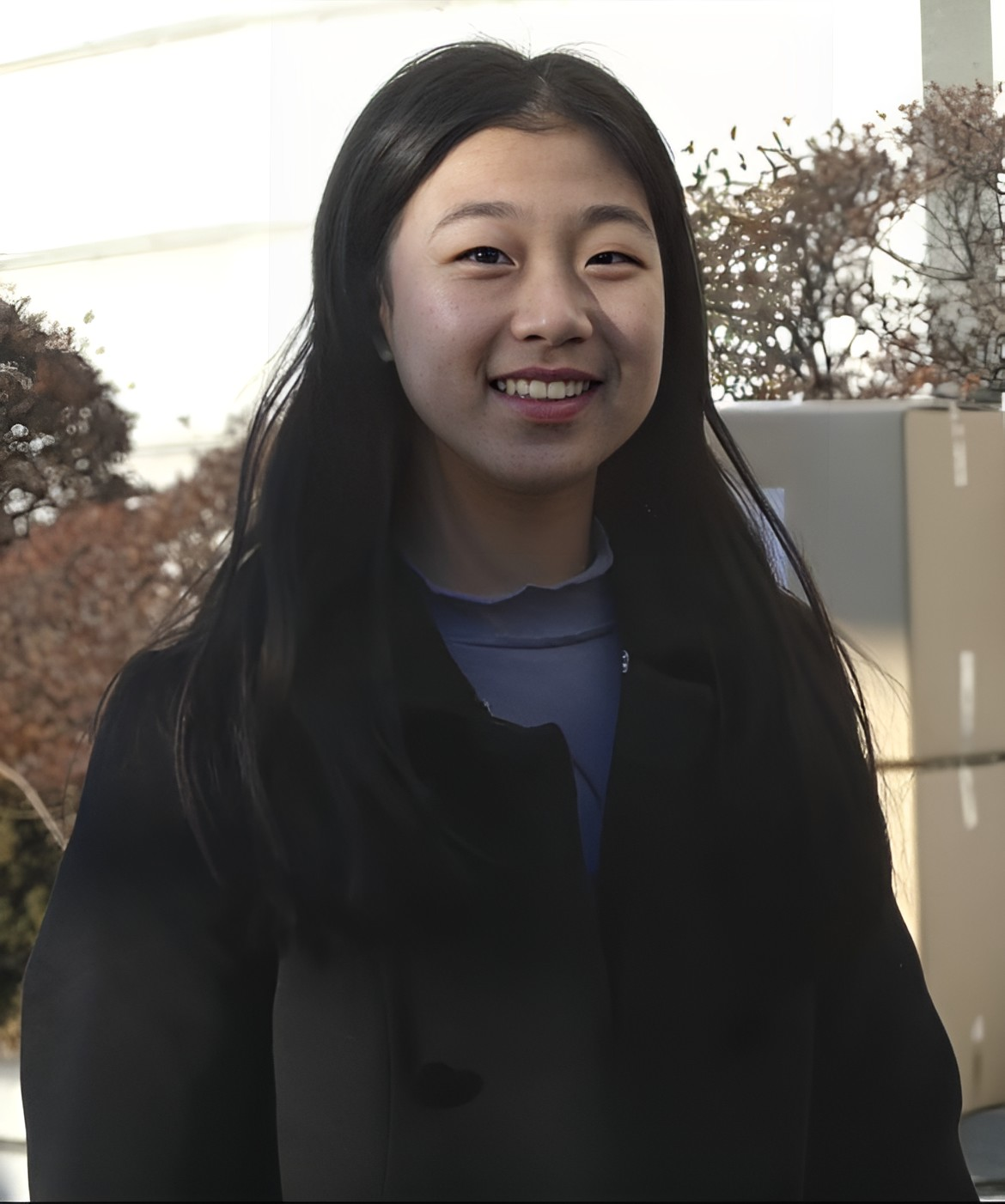
- Lee in January 2019
- Born: August 30, 2006 (age 20); Gimhae, South Korea
- Years active: 2014–present
- Agent: Lead Entertainment

Korean name
- Hangul: 이지원
- Hanja: 李智媛
- RR: I Jiwon
- MR: I Chiwŏn

Lee Ji-won (Korean: 이지원; born August 30, 2006) is a South Korean actress. She is mostly known for her role as Kang Ye-bin in Sky Castle.

== Filmography ==
=== Film ===
Year	Title	Role	Notes	Ref.
2014	Thuy	Hyun-jung		
2014	How to Steal a Dog	Chae-rang		
2017	RV: Resurrected Victims	Myung Eun-ji		
2018	The Discloser	Park Shi-won		
2018	Omok Girl	Jo Young Nam		
2018	Soldier's Mementos	Yun-yi	Cameo	
2020	Hitman: Agent Jun	Ga-young		
2025	Hitman 2	Ga-young		
2025	En Route To	Kyung-sun	Best Actor Award at 30th Busan International Film Festival	

=== Television series ===
Year	Title	Role	Notes	Ref.
2015	The Producers	Tak Ye-jin (young)	Guest role	
2017	Ms. Perfect	Chae Ri		
2018	Sky Castle	Kang Ye-bin		
2019	Romance Is a Bonus Book	Hong Jae-hee		
2020–2023	The Uncanny Counter	Im Joo-yeon	Season 1–2	
2021	Racket Boys	Lee Han-sol		

== Awards and nominations ==
Name of the award ceremony, year presented, category, nominee of the award, and the result of the nomination
Award ceremony	Year	Category	Nominee / Work	Result	Ref.
SBS Drama Awards	2021	Best Supporting Team (Note: with Kim Min-ki, Lee Ji-won, Jung Min-seong, Kim Kang-hoon, Cha Mi-kyung and Shin Cheol-jin)	Racket Boys	Won	
Busan International Film Festival	2025	Busan Award for Best Actor	En Route To	Won	
