= Satoko Always =

2026 Japanese comedy-drama film

- Film poster

Japanese name
- Kanji: さとこはいつも
Transcriptions
- Romanization: Satoko wa Itsumo
- Directed by: Shūichi Okita
- Screenplay by: Shūichi Okita
- Produced by: Ryohei Tsutsui; Miyuki Sato; Suguru Kubota; Yuya Tanaka
- Starring: Kasumi Arimura; Hikari Ishida; Kashun Himeno
- Cinematography: Akiko Ashizawa
- Edited by: Masaya Ozaki
- Music by: Yuta Orisaka; Satoko Shibata
- Production company: Amuse Studio
- Distributed by: Hakuhodo DY Music & Pictures
- Release date: 18 September 2026 (Japan)
- Running time: 139 minutes
- Country: Japan
- Language: Japanese

Satoko Always (Japanese: さとこはいつも, Hepburn: Satoko wa Itsumo) is a 2026 Japanese comedy-drama film directed by Shūichi Okita. It follows the lives of three women named Satoko — a middle-schooler (Kashun Himeno), a young working woman (Kasumi Arimura), and a middle-aged housewife (Hikari Ishida), all pursuing a love of writing, with intersecting storylines.

== Plot ==
Satoko (聡子) Nakai, a 15-year-old middle schooler, unexpectedly meets classmate Hayase in a clinic, upon which she develops a crush on him. On a school trip to see a Kabuki performance, Satoko falls asleep, and, when handed an assignment to write about the performance, fabricates a story. Her teacher, the cold Terao, notices she has a talent for writing, and gives her a notebook from which she assigns essays. For the first essay, Satoko write a love letter to her favorite food, Shiokara. Next, she has to write a will for herself. Terao, now Satoko's role model, sees the fictional aspects of her "will" and encourages her to write a novel. Suddenly, Terao resigns from the school, having been found with a male student in her house. Satoko continues writing, creating a story about Hayase, her, and a group of children playing baseball.

35-year-old Satoko (沙都子) Nishida works in film distribution for Korean productions. She is obsessed with K-dramas, watching them every night, and is in the process of making marketing materials for a new melodramatic baseball film from a famous director about a coach who inspires a team. Her lover, Muramoto, invites her out for dinner. After that, they have sex at her apartment, and Satoko tells Muramoto about a childhood experience similar to that with Terao, but replacing Kabuki with Akira Kurosawa's Dreams. Muramoto leaves, and Satoko resumes watching her romantic K-Dramas, but she suddenly notices Muramoto's wife at the window. Breaking in, she stabs Satoko. Hospitalized, Satoko meets an older woman in the same room who offers her oranges and talks to her. Satoko begins writing a story on her laptop about her six-year-long affair with Muramoto, stylized in the film like a K-drama. Upon returning to work, Satoko is put together with a new hire, Shima, who shares her hobbies. Satoko and Shima grow close on an assignment, and they have sex at her apartment. While Shima is sleeping, Satoko goes to her laptop and deletes the story.

Satoko (里子) Iijima is a 55-year-old housewife living with her husband and the youngest of her three sons, who has just graduated high school and decided to move out for university. One day, at a clinic, she meets the young Satoko Nakai, whom she sees writing her "will" — talking with her about writing, she tells the younger Satoko that she once dreamed of being a novelist, having lived in a tiny village in Hokkaido with only one bookstore — she developed a crush on the man working there, and soon her love of books exceeded her love of him. Now freed from her responsibilities, she starts writing in her notebook about her childhood in Hokkaido — however, instead of using herself, she sees a bird outside her window, inspiring her to make the main character a bird, which is stop motion animated in the film's depiction of it. Satoko's husband reads a draft while she is sleeping. The next day, Satoko's husband requests to go to the trampoline gym she attends regularly with her, and apologizes to her for cutting off her dream — they had had their first child at 23 and Satoko had to abandon writing to be a mother. He encourages her to write more, and send the draft to her sons. One day, at the trampoline gym, the trampoline under Satoko breaks, and she is rushed to the hospital. There, she shares a room with Satoko Nishida, and she is revealed to be the older woman who gave her the orange. She gives her draft to the younger Satoko, and they discuss writing.

Satoko Iijima signs up for a creative writing class at a university, and her husband makes her a lunch congratulating her on her first class. Soon after she arrives, Satoko Nishida also comes, and seeing Iijima, sits at her table. Then, they are joined by Satoko Nakai, whom Iijima recognizes from the clinic. The three Satokos sit together, intently listening to the lecture.

== Cast ==
- Kashun Himeno as Satoko Nakai
- Kasumi Arimura as Satoko Nishida
- Hikari Ishida as Satoko Iijima
- Yō Yoshida as Chiho Terao
- Daisuke Kuroda as Keigo Nakai
- Toharu Ogawa as Yuu Hayase
- Joe Odagiri as Kengo Muramoto
- Yuzu Aoki as Yuusuke Shima
- Michitaka Tsutsui as Shigeaki Iijima
- Kanata Hosoda as man in bookstore

== Casting ==
Regarding the casting of the actors for Satoko Nakai, director Shūichi Okita said that he had looked for an actor who could evoke the same kind of emotion as Elliot Page in Juno, and said that in her audition, he liked her awkward pauses, which could contribute to the film's dialogue, and the fact that she found the "will" to be funny and engaging. For the role of Satoko Nishida, Okita said that he chose Kasumi Arimura because he had always associated her with cool characters, and wanted to see her getting stabbed in a role. For Satoko Iijima, Okita had been a fan of Hikari Ishida for a long time, and had her practice on a trampoline.

== Themes ==
The main theme of the film is that of writing, as each Satoko has to confront their personal problems in order to pursue their dreams of writing novels.

Okita originally conceived of the film as focusing on only the middle-schooler Satoko, but expanded it to include three different women who could be interpreted as one. The film, inspired by Before the Rain (1994), was intended to be looping in a "Möbius strip"-like way, where each story loosely connects with the other, which "captures the way people influence each other". As an example, Okita cites Ms. Terao reading Satoko Iijima's book, which is anachronistic to the storyline. Reviewer Mark Schilling calls the characters "not-always-reliable protagonists" in a "discombobulating multilayered story". James Marsh calls it "playing with the viewer's comprehension of what is unfolding", and describes the film's themes as "indulging our yearning to open our hearts and tell stories, not for the entertainment of others or financial reward, but as a creative and emotional outlet to nurture one’s own sanity and well-being". Amber Wilkinson says that the film also includes themes of love, "from the women’s newly or rediscovered passion for creativity to the quiet care that goes into a message carefully written in sauce on top of rice in a lunchbox", while concurring with other reviews in saying that the lines between fiction and reality are blurred.

== Release ==
The film was released and screened early in select theaters, starting from August 27, when it had an early screening at Toho Cinemas Namba in Osaka. It was released domestically on September 18 starting at Toho Cinemas Nihonbashi in Tokyo. The film had its international premiere at Busan International Film Festival on October 7.

== Critical reception ==
Mark Schilling, writing for The Japan Times, gave the film a three out of five stars, praising the narrative threads that link the three protagonists, who could be "essentially the same person at different stages of life" and calling it "delightfully loopy and empathetic". James Marsh, writing for Variety, praised the "wonderfully woven screenplay, together with its triumvirate of stellar performances". For Screen International, reviewer Amber Wilkinson said that "the director has a light touch but he smuggles in more serious ideas", praising Himeno's performance and calling it a "whimsical and inventive comedy drama" with "enjoyable complexity around notions of creativity". Karen Park, writing for the Busan International Film Festival, called the film "warm, bittersweet, and undeniably resonant". Clarence Tsui, writing for The Film Verdict, called it "a subtle celebration of the transformative power of the written word" and "injecting warmth and inspiration into the lives of characters contending with solitude and anxiety, a celebration of craftmanship in the age of automation." Robert Daniels, writing for RogerEbert.com, called the film "often surprising and immensely delightful", and earning "resonance by simply depicting the joy writing brings to these three characters". Although he noted that the film seemed that it was "making it all up as it goes along", he praised this adventurousness "required to produce something special."

== Accolades ==
Name of the award ceremony, year presented, category, nominee of the award, and the result of the nomination
Award	Date of ceremony	Category	Recipient(s)	Result	Ref.
Nikkan Sports Film Awards	27 December 2026	Best Actress	Kashun Himeno	Pending	
Nikkan Sports Film Awards	27 December 2026	Best Newcomer	Kashun Himeno	Pending	
