= En Route To =

2025 independent South Korean film

- Hangul: 지우러 가는 길
- RR: Jiureo ganeun gil
- MR: Chiurŏ kanŭn kil
- Directed by: Yoo Jae-in
- Screenplay by: Yoo Jae-in
- Produced by: Kim Ji-hyoung
- Starring: Sim Su-bin; Lee Ji-won; Jang Sun
- Cinematography: Baek Jae-ryung
- Music by: Lee Eun-joo
- Production company: Korean Academy of Film Arts
- Distributed by: Hive Filmworks Inc
- Release date: September 19, 2025 (Busan)
- Running time: 108 minutes
- Country: South Korea
- Language: Korean

En Route To is a 2025 independent South Korean coming-of-age film written and directed by Yoo Jaein about a teenage pregnancy. It had its world premiere in competition at the 2025 Busan International Film Festival, where it was awarded best actress for Lee Jiwon. At the festival, director Yoo also received the New Currents Award.

== Premise ==
The film touches on themes of teenage pregnancy, parental abandonment, abusive teachers, and suicide.

It follows Yoon-ji, a first-year high school student who becomes pregnant after an affair with her married homeroom teacher. Following the pregnancy, her teacher suddenly disappears without notice. Despite wanting a family, Yoon-ji decides to get an abortion, believing that this might bring back the return of her teacher.

Without money, Yoon-ji is brought to steal the savings of her roommate Kyeong-seon to purchase illegal abortion pills in order to terminate her pregnancy. While this initially causes strife with Kyeong-seon, who has been illegally selling vape cartridges to classmates, she soon starts to help Yoon-ji when she realizes the reason for Yoon-ji's theft.

== Cast ==
- Sim Su-bin as Yun-ji
- Lee Ji-won as Kyung-sun
- Jang Sun as Min-yeong

== Production ==
The film is Yoo's graduation project at the Korea Academy of Film Arts. It marks her feature directorial debut. Yoo also wrote the screenplay.

Yoo had previously directed short films including Happyhappy Cookingtime, Hey, How Are You?, Return To Sender, and Ghwa The Last Name, the ladder of which had won the best short film prize at the 2023 Blue Dragon Awards.

== Release ==
En Route To competed in the Competition section of the 30th Busan International Film Festival on September 19, 2025, for 'Bosan Awards'.

Hive Filmworks acquired the sales rights of the film in September 2025.

== Reception ==
Dennis Harvey of Variety praised the “strong Korean debut”, noting that the film takes an “assured, unpredictable path through seriocomic coming-of-age territory”, while also commenting on the “impressive narrative journey”. On Yoo, he writes she “takes risk she pulls off with admirable dexterity” while “maintaining unobtrusive control over her adept performers, set-pieces and pacing”.

Pierce Conran of ScreenAnarchy writes that “Yoo's film stands apart from its peers not just for its humour” but also for its “fleet-footed pacing and editing”.

== Awards and nominations ==
Award ceremony	Date of ceremony	Category	Recipient	Result	Ref.
Busan International Film Festival	September 26, 2025	Best Actor	Lee Ji-won	Won	
