= Basil Tsiokos =

Basil Tsiokos is a documentary programmer for film festivals. He is currently a senior programmer for documentaries at the Sundance Film Festival.

== Education ==
Tsiokos attended Stanford University for college, graduating in 1995. After graduation, Tsiokos took a year off to do “his own film school” where he read on cinema studies, before going to graduate school at New York University.

== Career ==
Tsiokos had originally intended to become professor in film studies, but while in graduate school he interned at NewFest film festival and was later elevated to become artistic director within two years. He eventually stayed with NewFest for 12 years, before starting work at Doc NYC, where he worked from 2010 until 2021. During that time, Doc NYC became the largest documentary film festival in the U.S.

In 2021, Tsiokos took a full-time position as senior programmer at Sundance Film Festival, where he had previously worked as a screener and programming consultant. He has said the team curates with an emphasis on discovery, with an effort to showcase films that have not sold for distribution yet. He has also said that his team focuses on nonfiction, watching and tracking film projects that can be accessible and connective, and draw in different audiences.

He has also written for IndieWire and worked as a film program director for the Nantucket Film Festival.
