= 2026 Annecy International Animation Film Festival =

2026 film festival

- Official poster by Randall Finnerty.
- Opening film: Minions & Monsters
- Location: Annecy, France
- Awards: Cristal for Best Feature Film: The Violinist; Contrechamp Grand Prix: Blaise
- Festival date: 21–27 June 2026

Annecy International Animation Film Festival
- 2027 2025

The 2026 Annecy International Animation Film Festival took place from 21 to 27 June 2026, in Annecy, France. Pierre Coffin's American animated comedy film Minions & Monsters served as the opening film for the festival.

The international co-production The Violinist, directed by Ervin Han and Raúl García, won the Cristal Award for Best Film, while French film Blaise, directed by Dimitri Planchon and Jean-Paul Guigue, won the Contrechamp Grand Prix.

== Background ==
The complete Annecy International Animation Film Festival lineup was announced on 28 April 2026. Alongside the films for each section, special presentations of upcoming projects were also announced. These include works from various film studios such as: Illumination with Minions & Monsters as the festival's opening film; Pixar with the presentation of a behind-the-scenes look of Enrico Casarosa's Gatto; Netflix with a special presentation of Brad Bird's Ray Gunn, a preview of Ben Hibon and Elliot Kalan's Ghostbusters series, and a sneak peek of the series Alley Cats alongside a masterclass from creator and voice cast member Ricky Gervais; Laika with a sneak peek of Travis Knight's Wildwood; Walt Disney Animation Studios with the presentation of previously unseen footage of Hexed, directed by Fawn Veerasunthorn, Jason Hand and Josie Trinidad, along with the premiere of Lilo & Stitch short film Lilo & Scratch, directed by Veerasunthorn and Malcon Pierce; Warner Bros. Animation with Jeff Wamester's Batman: Knightfall Part 1: Knightfall.

Two recipients for the Honorary Cristal Lifetime Achievement Award were announced: American animator, director and writer Mike Judge and American stop-motion animators and filmmaking duo Brothers Quay. Judge, creator of the series King of the Hill presented a preview of the upcoming 15th season of the series alongside co-creator Greg Daniels and showrunner Saladin K. Patterson. Both recipients of the award also gave masterclasses during the festival. The official poster for the festival was designed by Canadian visual artist Randall Finnerty and features different animals and native birds from the Haute-Savoie region gathering in a spiral.

== Official Competition ==
=== Feature films ===
The following films were selected to be screened:

English title	Original title	Director(s)	Production countrie(s)
Decorado		Alberto Vázquez	Spain
In Waves		Phuong Mai Nguyen	France, Belgium
Iron Boy	Le Corset	Louis Clichy	France, Belgium
Lucy Lost	Lucy perdue	Olivier Clert	France
Nobody	浪浪山小妖怪	Shui Yu	China
The Sunrise File		Rupert Wyatt, Émilie Phuong	France, Luxembourg
Tana		Ji Zhao, Ke Er Zhu	China
Tangles		Leah Nelson	Canada, United States
The Violinist	La Violoniste	Ervin Han, Raúl García	Singapore, Spain, Italy
Viva Carmen	Carmen, l'Oiseau Rebel	Sébastien Laudenbach	France
We Are Aliens	我々は宇宙人	Kohei Kadowaki	Japan, France

=== Contrechamp ===
The following films were selected to be screened:

English title	Original title	Director(s)	Production countrie(s)
58th		Carl Joseph Papa	Philippines
Blaise		Dimitri Planchon, Jean-Paul Guigue	France
Muyi	Muyi, la légende du village des femmes	Julien Chheng	France
A New Dawn	花緑青が明ける日に	Yoshitoshi Shinomiya	Japan, France
The Obsessed	トリツカレ男	Wataru Takahashi	Japan
The Orbit of Minor Satellites		Christopher Sullivan	Japan
Peleliu: Guernica of Paradise	ペリリュー -楽園のゲルニカ-	Gorō Kuji	Japan
The Son of a Bitch	O filho da puta	Érica Maradona, Otto Guerra, Tania Anaya, Sávio Leite	Brazil
Spacetime Chronicles		Stefano Bertelli	Italy
Welcome to Dolly's House		Seven Ych, Rady Fu, Tree Muta	Taiwan
Winnipeg, the Seed of Hope	Winnipeg, el barco de la esperanza	Beñat Beitia, Elio Quiroga	Spain, Chile, Argentina

=== Short films ===
The following short films were selected to be screened:

English title	Original title	Director(s)	Production countrie(s)
How to Walk		Zak Margolis	United States
Blessed		Birute Sodeikaite	Canada
The Quinta's Ghost	El fantasma de la quinta	James A. Castillo	Spain
What We Leave Behind	Ce qu'on laisse derrière	Jean-Sébastien Hamel, Alexandra Myotte	Canada
God is Shy	Dieu est timide	Jocelyn Charles	France
Motherhood		Anca Damian	Belgium, France, Romania
Hag		Anna Ginsburg	United Kingdom
The Spring Sea	春の海	Kōji Yamamura	Japan
Winter in March	Lumi saadab meid	Natalia Mirzoyan	Armenia, Belgium, Estonia, France
Water Girl	Fille de l'eau	Sandra Demazières	France, Netherlands, Portugal
Paper Trail		Don Hertzfeldt	United States
The Little White Queen	La Petite Reine blanche	Théo Hanosset, Mathieu Georis	Belgium, France
Cosmonauts		Leo Černic	Slovenia, Italy
Ultra Strong	Ultra forte	Catherine Lepage	Canada
The Picture of Dorian Gray		Georges Schwizgebel	Switzerland
The Berry Picker	De Bramenplukker	Pieter Coudyzer	Belgium
Creation	Alkotás	Béla Klingl	Hungary
Virgem Fandango		Marcy Page	Canada, Portugal
Daughters of the Late Colonel		Elizabeth Hobbs	United Kingdom, Germany
Cartoon Physics		Ru Kuwahata, Max Porter	France, Netherlands, Switzerland
Adgwa-Ata		Zsuzsanna Kreif	Hungary, France
Please		Anna Mantzaris	Sweden, France, Czechia, Norway, Finland
Two Ice Creams Please		Jasmine Elsen	Belgium
Balconada	Балконада	Iva Tokmakchieva	France, Belgium
When the Sea was Calm		Mamuka Tkeshelashvili	Georgia
My Bellyaching Skin	Les Pelures d'estomac	Etienne Bonnet	France
Uka-Uka		Henri Veermäe	Estonia
Night Song	Canción de noche	Karla Castañeda	Mexico
Lake Messejana	Lagoa do abandono	Diego Maia	Brazil
Penguin	Pingviin	Kaspar Jancis	Estonia, France
Black Box		Anton Dyakov	France, Norway
Danse macabre		Hisko Hulsing	Netherlands, France, Belgium, Hungary
To the Woods	Une fugue	Agnès Patron	France
Invisible Harvests		Stephanie Dudley	Canada

=== Television ===
The following productions were selected to be screened:

English title	Episode	Director(s)	Production countrie(s)
SpongeBob SquarePants	"Go Fetch!"	Adam Paloian	United States
Christmas in the Boonies		Mikki Mägi	Estonia
Wolly Wolly	"The New Kid"	Emmanuel Linderer	France, Canada
The Great Dreamscape		Rémi Durin	Belgium, France
Chip Joins a Cult		Maddie Brewer	United States
Dino Does It Wrong?		Danna Galeano	Canada, Colombia, Egypt
Il Baracchino		Nicolò Cuccì, Salvo Di Paola	Italy
The Chosen One		Yong Yang	China
Candy Caries		Tomoki Misato	Japan
The Doomies	"Night of the Fishing Dead"	Andrés Fernandez	France
Takopi's Original Sin		Shinya Iino	Japan
Pol the Pirate Mouse	"Cave Monster"	Bouwine Pool	Netherlands
Ling Cage		Xiangbo Dong	China
Doggie and Pussycat		Barbora Dlouhá	Czechia
Ewilan's Quest	"On the Road"	Fabien Daphy, Eve Ceccarelli-Moing, Justine Mettler	France, Belgium
Jaadugar: A Witch in Mongolia		Naoko Yamada, Abel Góngora	Japan
The Broos		David Mirailles	France
Blooming Wanders		Inès Bernard-Espina, Mélody Boulissière, Clémentine Campos	France
Puissances noires		Cécile Bonneau	France
Max & Bunny		Clément Céard	France
Song of the Storms		Caroline Attia	France, Belgium
YaYa's Band		Chun-Chien Lien, Pohan Lee	Taiwan
Love, Death + Robots	"How Zeke Got Religion"	Diego Porral	United States
Sparks of Tomorrow	"Episode 1"	Minoru Ōta	Japan
Wuthering Hearts		Laura Jayne Hodkin	United Kingdom, United States
Long Story Short	"Shira Can't Cook"	Jack Shih, Katie Rice, Ryan Quincy	United States
My Brother the Minotaur	"Episode 10"	Maurice Joyce	Ireland, United States
Not a Box	"It's a Boat"	Siri Melchior	United Kingdom, United States
Star Wars: Maul – Shadow Lord	"Chapter 9: Strange Allies"	Brad Rau	United States

=== Commissioned Films ===
Title	Director(s)	Production countrie(s)
The Magic Palm Theatre – Feinaki Beijing Animation Week 2025	Lei Lei	China
Snoop Dogg featuring Jelly Roll: "Last Dance with Mary Jane"	Dave Meyers, Ravach Kelzang, Marion Castéra	United States, France
You Are an Idiot	Inari Sirola	Sweden, United Kingdom
Design and Animation School	Natia Nikolashvili	Georgia
How Smart are Crows	Irida Zhonga	Greece, United States
Siamés: "The Phoenix"	Mary Yanko, Marlène Ciampossin	France
Oberka: "Wildbait"	Lee Oz, Eliška Oz	Czechia
Detention's Ripple Effect: Why Inhumanity Breeds Hatred	Ahmad Mohammad Nady	Egypt
16th Anibar International Animation Festival Trailer: "WTF?!"	Joni Männistö	Finland
Wonder Studios Ident	Stefan Falconer, Mathieu Durand	United Kingdom
A$AP Rocky: "Helicopter"	Daniel Streit	United States
Odezenne: "Aïe aïe aïe"	Vladimir Mavounia-Kouka	France
El Cuarteto de Nos: "En el cuarto de Nico"	Julia Conde	Argentina
Unloved	Illogic Studio, Victor Caire, Lucas Navarro, Théophile Dufresne	France
Ricoré	Victor Haegelin	France
Here's to 100 Years of Circuit Breakers	Alan Smith, Adam Foulkes	France, Germany, Italy, Spain, United Kingdom
La Ride Partie 2	Edern van Hille	France
Friss Kakas Animation Film Days Spot	Máté Horesnyi	Hungary
Christmas Legend	Quentin Fachon, François Hogue	Canada
Equity in the Workplace: The Experiences of Black Irish Women in Academia and Teaching Profession	Sandra Vivas	Dominica, Ireland, Venezuela
Cœur Vert Nez Rouge	Fabienne Le Loher, Juliette Hamon Damourette	France
Eco Beat	Eva Bienert, Max Mörtl	Austria, Germany
La Petite Robe noire: le Parfum	Elsa Snakers	France
Teleton Changes Everything	Mario Muñoz	Mexico
Spot MONSTRA 2025	Vasco Casula	Portugal
Little Nightmares: Broken Promises	Sofia Carrillo, Juan J. Medina	France, Mexico
Flea featuring Thom Yorke: "Traffic Lights"	Nespy 5Euro	Mexico, Italy, United States
Future Islands: "The Moon is Blue"	Wandrille Mauroury	France
Pune Design Festival 2026	Nijin Nazeem	India
Devil May Cry: "Opening Credits"	Arthur Chaumay, Simon Duong van Huyen	France
Anima Festival Trailer 2025	Raman Djafari	Germany
Arrigo Barnabé: "Clara Crocodilo, 1980"	Samuel Mariani, Camila Kater	Brazil
Paul Kalkbrenner: "Cronitis Boy"	Raman Djafari	Germany
Reply 2 H8	Simón Wilches-Castro	United States
The Notebook	Aghil Hosseinian, Sogol Sanagoo	Iran

=== Off-Limits ===
English title	Original title	Director(s)	Production countrie(s)
XYZ		Alexandre Alagôa	Portugal
Core Dump		Alona Rodeh	Germany
Evacuations		Lilli Carré	United States
The Stars Watch from Long Ago		Stacey Steers	United States
From Apple to Egg	Ab mala usque ab ovo	Nadiia Pliamko	Estonia
Symbionts		Quirjin Dees	Switzerland
Merrimundi		Niles Atallah	Chile
Adage		Jack Barrett	United Kingdom

=== Perspectives ===
English title	Original title	Director(s)	Production countrie(s)
The Comet	La Comète	Julie Charette	Canada
Rest		Ryotaro Miyajima	Japan
The Travails of Ajadi		Adetunji Adeoye	Nigeria
Misophonia		Michelle Gruppetta	Malta
Decay	Decaer	Juan Camilo González	Colombia
Paper Daughter		Cami Kwan	United States
City of Roses	Cidade das rosas	Siso Barros, Barca Bogante	Brazil
Acid City		Jack Wedge, Will Freudenheim	United States
Once in a Body	Una vez en un cuerpo	María Cristina Pérez González	Colombia, United States
That Night		Hoda Sobhani	Iran, United States
Bucketman		Yakata Kanata	Japan
Because Today is Saturday	Porque hoje é sábado	Alice Eça Guimarães	Brazil
Entelechy	Entelequía	Marcos Sánchez	Chile
Three Paraih Cats	Tres gatos parias	Iván Sierra	Colombia
Hold It Together	Sundruð	Fan Sissoko	Iceland, France, Belgium
Chance		Pooya Afzali	Iran
The Boa Woman	La mujer boa	Stephanie Boyd, Miguel Araoz Cartagena	Peru

=== Young Audiences ===
English title	Original title	Director(s)	Production countrie(s)
On the Matt Outside My Door	Vor meiner Tür auf einer Matte	Antje Heyn	Germany
Aller & Retour		Lucia Bulgheroni, Michele Greco	Italy
Grounded		Chris Callus	New Zealand
Piccolo Piccolo		Marta Gennari	France, Switzerland
Cloud Fish	Poisson nuage	Noé Garcia	France, Belgium
Bats & Bugs		Lena von Döhren	Switzerland
Eeny, Meeny, Miny, Moe!	En, ten, týky!	Andrea Szelosová	Slovakia, Czechia
Into the Forest	Vers la forêt	Antonin Niclass	Switzerland
Cosmonaut	Cosmonaute	Zoltán Horváth	Switzetland
A Dog's Life	Hondenleven	Sophie Olga de Jong, Sytake Kok	Netherlands

=== Graduation Films ===
English title	Original title	Director(s)	Production countrie(s)	Institution(s)
A Body without a Horse?		Lara Fuke	Belgium, Brazil, Finland, Portugal	RE:ANIMA
The 12 Inch Pianist		Lucas Ansel	United States	Rhode Island School of Design
Nursing Room		Tianjing Yuan, Sijia Wang	China	Rhode Island School of Design
Cold Bathroom		Eleni Aerts	Belgium, Switzerland	Royal Academy of Fine Arts of Ghent
Tethered		Alessandro Cino Zolfanelli	United Kingdom	National Film and Television School
Eyeliner		Aisha Boudjillouli	United Kingdom	National Film and Television School
Fisheye		Łukasz Rygal	Poland	Jan Matejko Academy of Fine Arts
Foreign Bodies		Lysander Wong	United Kingdom	Central Saint Martins
Ball Face		Laurence Thérien	United Kingdom	Royal College of Art
Mis-Angel		Wyatt Carson	United Kingdom	Royal College of Art
A Bloody Situation		Nerian Keywan	United Kingdom	Royal College of Art
Oldies of the Coast		Clarence Fennessy	Australia	Royal Melbourne Institute of Technology
Tar		Fariba Farzanfar, Kaveh Sistani	Iran	University of Art
L'Œuf noir		Ousmane Cissé	France	EMCA
Awaken Night	Une nuit debout	Julie-Ann Déry	Canada	Mel Hoppenheim School of Cinema
Mom		Camille de Vulpillieres	Belgium	La Cambre
Insecticide	Insecticida	Paula Gallego González	Spain	Technical University of Valencia
The Day I Licked a Pebble	Le jour où j'ai léché un caillou	Flavie Eliézer, Chloé Bernuchon, Goli Atefi, Maud Kolasa, Marie Pijollet	France	École MOPA
The Amazing Kitsuverse		Leo Neumann	Germany	Film Academy Baden-Württemberg
Gently	Křehce	Jamaica Kinglová	Czechia	Film and TV School of the Academy of Performing Arts in Prague
Dying Embers	Les Dernières Braises	Léa Pulini	France	La Poudrière
Jincheng Driving School		Bing Hao Jiao	China	China Academy of Art
I Am Li Yangqiao	我叫李杨桥	Yiquian Ma, Quinai Lin, Xihan Yin, Zhiyan Chen, Ruizhe Pan	China	Communication University of China
The Rossini Garden	Le Jardin Rossini	William Burger, Siméon Jacob, Garance Mondamert, Mathilde Vergereau, Arthur Wong, Odelia Laine, Tara Rewal	France	Gobelins, l'école de l'image
Gauze		Noran Alezabi, Nicholas Arujah, Xinyue Ma, Yulin Yue, Xiaonan Zhou	France	Gobelins, l'école de l'image
Agathe Must Go	Agathe doit partir	Dylan Hall, Maya Matar	France	Atelier de Sèvres
The Sound of the Jaguar	El canto del jaguar	Antonia Sofía Silva Alvardo	Mexico	National School of Cinematic Arts
Free Food Race		Swan Brocher	France	École Émile-Cohl
Mauruuru Roa		Ysoline Despierre	France	École Émile-Cohl
Plankton α	プランクトン α	Yini Guo	Japan	Tokyo University of the Arts
So He Grabbed the Knife	そしてナイフを手にした	Sam Kuwa	Japan, China	Tokyo University of the Arts
Queens of the Pampa	Reinas de la pampa	Millaray Isella Arriagada	Chile	University of Development
False Door	Ślepe Wrota	Oktawia Derybowska	Poland	University of Fine Arts, Poznań
The Mother's Voice	Da Mor Ghag	Mian Ijlal Ahmad	Pakistan	National College of Arts
Bonefuzz		Márk László	Hungary	Moholy-Nagy University of Art and Design
Immature		Eddy Wu	Netherlands, Taiwan	AKV St. Joost
Fingerbang		Yeonwoo Kim	South Korea	Hongik University
Aïcha Kandicha		Fayrouz Harmatallah Sbaï	France, Morocco	École nationale supérieure des arts décoratifs
Slap	ビンタ	Yiling Wang	Japan	Tama Art University
Taming Phenomena		Shunyuan Yao	Estonia	Estonian Academy of Arts
From Narva with Love		Paulina Belik	Estonia	Estonian Academy of Arts
The Mirage of a Dream	Mareechika	Kalyani B	India	National Institutes of Design
The Sea Spirit	Havsanden	Edwin Ivemark Kihlström	Sweden	Konst & Kulturakademien

==== Immersive Works ====
English title	Original title	Director(s)	Production countrie(s)
A Long Goodbye		Kate Voet, Victor Maes	Belgium, Luxembourg, Netherlands
Fallax		Owen Hindley	Iceland, United Kingdom
Insider Outsider		Philippe Cohen Solal	France
Lesbian Simulator		Iris van der Meule	Belgium, Canada, Netherlands
Lúcido		Vier	Portugal
Reversal		Lena Herzog	United States
The Baby Factory Is Closed		Deepa Mann-Kler	United Kingdom
The Dollhouse		Charlotte Bruneau, Dominic Desjardins	Luxembourg, Canada
The World Came Flooding In		Isobel Knowles, Van Sowerwine	Australia
Voooooo---Peeeeee---	부우우---피이이---	Hyeunjoo Woo, Jiyun Park	South Korea

=== Out of competition ===
==== Screening Events ====
Title	Director(s)	Production countrie(s)
Rogue Trooper	Duncan Jones	United Kingdom
Paw Patrol: The Dino Movie	Cal Brunker	Canada
Dive into The Ghost in the Shell (Note: Exclusive presentation of behind the scenes footage from the series The Ghost in the Shell alongside director Mokochan and producers Kôhei Sakita, Kengo Abe, and Daichi Sasa.)		Japan
Lysistrata (Note: Screening of the posthumous film Lysistrata by Richard Williams, who passed away in 2019.)	Richard Williams	United Kingdom
Batman: Knightfall Part 1: Knightfall	Jeff Wamester	United States
Next on Netflix Animation: From Ghostbusters to Brad Bird's Ray Gunn (Note: Exclusive preview of a new series from the Ghostbusters franchise, directed by Ben Hibon and Elliot Kalan, as well as a presentation of Brad Bird's Ray Gunn.)		United States
Fleur	Rémi Chayé	France
Wildwood (Note: Sneak peek of Travis Knight's latest Laika film Wildwood.)	Travis Knight	United States
Warner Bros. Pictures Animation - A New Chapter (Note: Showcase of future projects from the studio including exclusive footage from the film The Cat in the Hat, directed by Alessandro Carloni and Erica Rivinoja; a new Looney Tunes short film Daffy Season, directed by Todd Wilderman and Hamish Grieve; and the movie Bad Fairies.)		United States
Discovering Nakalimutan, the Forgotten Island (Note: Showcase of the work behind DreamWorks Animation latest film Forgotten Island, directed by Joel Crawford and Januel Mercado.)		United States
Lights, Camera, Aardman (Note: Special celebration of Aardman's history and films, with special guests including Peter Lord, Nick Park and David Sproxton.)		United Kingdom
Walt Disney Animation Showcase (Note: World premiere of the short film Lilo & Scratch, directed by Fawn Veerasunthorn and Malcon Pierce. Presentation of exclusive behind the scenes footage of the film Hexed, directed by Fawn Veerasunthorn, Jason Hand and Josie Trinidad.)		United States
Pixar Animation Studios (Note: Presentation of exclusive behind the scenes footage of Gatto, directed by Enrico Casarosa.)		United States
A Masterclass with Ricky Gervais, writer and director of Netflix's Alley Cats		United States
Minions & Monsters	Pierre Coffin	United States
King of the Hill Season 15 Exclusive Screening (Note: Exclusive screening of the King of the Hill season 15 premiere, followed by a Q&A with Mike Judge, Greg Daniels, and Saladin K. Patterson.)		United States

==== Annecy Presents ====
English title	Original title	Director(s)	Production countrie(s)
Brave Cat		Gabriel Osorio	Chile
Julián		Louise Bagnall	Ireland
Born in the Jungle		Edmunds Jansons	Latvia, Poland, Czech Republic
Dante		Linda Hambäck	Sweden, Denmark, Norway
Poupelle of Chimney Town: The Clock Tower of Promise	約束の時計台	Yusuke Hirota	Japan
Dudley & the Invasion of the Space Slugs		Cherifa Bakhti	Luxembourg, Belgium, France, India
The Ribbon Hero	リボンヒーロー	Yuuki Igarashi	Japan
Girl in the Clouds	La Fille dans les nuages	Philippe Riche	France, Belgium
Little Trang Quynh: The Legend of the Golden Buffalo		Tranh Lam Tung	Vietnam
The Last Whale Singer		Reza Memari	Germany, Czech Republic, Canada
Monster Mia		Verena Fels	Austria, Spain, Germany
Samurai Ballerina	L'étoile de Paris en fleur / パリに咲くエトワール	Gorō Taniguchi	Japan
The Keeper of the Camphor Tree	クスノキの番人	Tomohiko Itō	Japan
Yugly		Yanis Belaid, Jérémie Degruson	Belgium

==== Midnight Specials ====
English title	Original title	Director(s)	Production countrie(s)
Grey		Xiaobei Song	United States
Carla and Her Legs	Carla und ihre Beine	Christoph Büttner	Germany
Tenebras		Francisco Rojas	Dominican Republic
Eclosión		Luis Morillo	Dominican Republic, Spain
Soul Shift		Christian Franz Schmidt	Germany
CALM, the Last Tale of Horacio Quiroga	CALM, el último cuento de Horacio Quiroga	María Ruisánchez, Álvaro León	Spain, Argentina, Mexico
Love You More Than I Will Die	螳螂	Joe Hsieh	Hong Kong, Taiwan
My Name is Lilith	Mon nom est Lilith	Leo Luna Robert-Tourneur	Belgium, France
The Flesh Dress	La robe peau	Joachim Hérissé	France
Hambre		Imanol Ortíz López	Spain
Dawn at Terezinha Building	Madrugada no Edifício Terezinha	César Cabral, Renato José Duque	Brazil
A Trip to the Ear	귀(耳)로의 여행	Park Jee-youn	South Korea
Wolpie of the Woods		Kat Messing	United States
Dinner		Haeji Jeong	South Korea
A Couple Clucking Chickens Were Still Kickin' in the Schoolyard	庭には二羽ニワトリがいた	Tatsuki Fujimoto	Japan
Builder		Ryoji Yamada	Japan
Best in Show		Niklas Dahlqvist	Sweden
Company Sports Day	직장인 체육대회	Lee Yong-seon	South Korea
Gregor		Manu Gómez	Belgium, France
Zsazsa Zaturnnah		Avid Liongoren	Philippines, France
Sekiro: No Defeat		Kenichi Kutsuna	Japan

==== Work in Progress ====
English title	Original title	Director(s)	Production countrie(s)
Seraphine		Sarah Van Den Boom	France, Luxembourg, Switzerland
The Wolf	Le Loup	Benjamin Massoubre, Fursy Teyssier	France, Luxembourg
Desechable		Carlos Gómez Salamanca	Colombia, Spain
Snoopy Unleashed		Steve Martino	Canada, United Kingdom
Ogresse		Cécile McLorin Salvant	Belgium, Canada, Switzerland, United States
Le Projet Shiatsung		Brigitte Archambault	Canada
Baahubali: The Eternal War		Ishan Shukla	India
Steps		Alyce Tzue, John Ripa	United States
Common Side Effects (season 2)		Benjy Brooke	United States
Igi		Natia Nikolashvili	Georgia, Greece
A Gwei		Hui Yi	China
Astro Boy Reboot		Nicolas Hess	France, Germany, Japan
Hide and Seek		Fabienne Giezendanner	Switzerland, France
Killtube		Kazuaki Kuribayashi	Japan
Cars: Lightning Racers		Nathan Chew, Travis Braun, Frank Montagna	United States
Monkey Quest		David N. Weiss	Japan, United States

== Awards ==
The following awards were presented:

=== Feature Films ===
- Cristal for Best Feature Film: The Violinist by Ervin Han and Raúl García
- Jury Award: Iron Boy by Louis Clichy
- Contrechamp Grand Prix: Blaise by Dimitri Planchon and Jean-Paul Guigue
- Contrechamp Jury Award: A New Dawn by Yoshitoshi Shinomiya
- Gan Foundation Award for Distribution: Iron Boy by Louis Clichy
- Audience Award for a Feature Film: Iron Boy by Louis Clichy
- Paul Grimault Award: Decorado by Alberto Vázquez

=== Short Films ===
- Cristal for Best Short Film: Paper Trail by Don Hertzfeldt
- Jury Award: God is Shy by Jocelyn Charles
- Audience Award for a Short Film: God is Shy by Jocelyn Charles
- Off-Limits Award: Core Dump by Alona Rodeh
- Jean-Luc Xiberras Award for a First Film: Please by Anna Mantzaris
- Alexeïeff – Parker Award: My Bellyaching Skin by Etienne Bonnet

=== TV and Commissioned Films ===
- Cristal for Best TV Production: The Great Dreamscape by Rémi Durin
- Cristal for Best Commissioned Film: Unloved by Illogic Studio, Victor Caire, Lucas Navarro, and Théophile Dufresne
- Jury Award for a TV Series: Takopi's Original Sin by Shinya Iino
- Jury Award for a TV Special: Song of the Storms by Caroline Attia
- Jury Award for a Commissioned Film: Eco Beat by Eva Bienert and Max Mörtl
- Audience Award for a TV Production: The Broos by David Mirailles

=== Graduation Films ===
- Cristal for Best Graduation Film: Ball Face by Laurence Thérien
- Jury Award: Dying Embers by Léa Pulini
- Lotte Reiniger Award: Gently by Jamaica Kinglová

=== VR Works ===
- Cristal for Best Immersive Work: A Long Goodbye by Kate Voet and Victor Maes

=== Special prizes ===
- SACEM Award for Best Original Soundtrack in a Feature Film: The Violinist by Ervin Han and Raúl García
- SACEM Award for Best Original Soundtrack in a Short Film: God is Shy by Jocelyn Charles
- Annecy Presents Audience Award: Brave Cat by Gabriel Osorio
- CANAL+ Junior Jury Award: Piccolo Piccolo by Marta Gennari
- Young Audience Award: Into the Forest by Antonin Niclass
- André Martin Award for a French Short Film: Hold It Together by Fan Sissoko
- ARTE Award for a European Short Film: Uka-Uka by Henri Veermäe
- Festivals Connexion Award for an Immersive Work: Voooooo---Peeeeee---' by Hyeunjoo Woo and Jiyun Park
- Vimeo Staff Pick Award for a Short Film: Creation by Béla Klingl
- Warner Bros. Animation Award for a Graduation Film: The 12 Inch Pianist by Lucas Ansel
- Midnight Shorts Award: Eclosión by Luis Morillo
- City of Annecy Award: Because Today is Saturday by Alice Eça Guimarães
- Titmouse WTF Award: You Are Not Part of the Cake by Ting-Jui Chen
- Titmouse WTF Jury Distinction: I Have A by Rory Waudby-Tolley
