= List of Singaporean films of 2026 =

This is a list of films produced in Singapore ordered by release in 2026.

== January–March ==
Opening		Title	Production company	Cast and crew	Ref.
J A N U A R Y	23	Filipiñana	Potocol, Ossian International, Epicmedia, Easy Riders, Idle Eye	Rafael Manuel (director)	
J A N U A R Y	24	Levitating	Rekata Studio, Masih Belajar Pictures, Momo Film Co, Les Contes Modernes, Aview Images	Wregas Bhanuteja (director)	
J A N U A R Y	29	A Good Fortune (百万红包)	Harvest9 Films, Eight And A Half	Jason Lee (director)	
J A N U A R Y	31	Ah Girl	Aggregate Films, Kusu Films	Ang Geck Geck Priscilla (director)	
J A N U A R Y	31	A Singapore Dementia Story	Lien Foundation, Dementia Singapore	Raymus Chang, Jenny Ng, Viknesh Saravaran, Gavin Lim, Andie Chen (directors)	
F E B R U A R Y	12	3 Good Guys (老婆，我爱你！)	B-01 Films, Clover Films	Boi Kwong (director)	
F E B R U A R Y	14	Not a Hero	Flying River Films, Akanga Film Asia	Rima Das (director)	
F E B R U A R Y	14	Sleep No More	Palari Films, Giraffe Pictures, Hassaku Lab, In Good Company, Apsara Films	Edwin (director)	
F E B R U A R Y	16	We Are All Strangers	Giraffe Pictures	Anthony Chen (director)	
F E B R U A R Y	16	Panda	Levo Films, Hong Kong Spark Peak Entertainment Group	Zhang Xinyang (director)	
F E B R U A R Y	17	Liang Po Po vs Ah Beng (梁婆婆 VS 阿炳)	Dreamax Entertainment, The Film Engine, Asia Tropical Films, ACO, GSC Movies, J Team Productions	Matt Lai (director)	
F E B R U A R Y	17	Luck My Life! (我的人生我自摸)	Cande Pictures	Eric Wong (director)	
M A R C H	19	Kong Tao (蠱降)	Mega Films Distribution, Infinity Picture, De Kangaroo Production, Distinct Entertainment, Amphibia Film, King Kong Media Production, Clover Films, Think Media, Sing Lian Ping	Peiji Goh, Yong Choon Lin (directors)	

== April–June ==
Opening		Title	Production company	Cast and crew	Ref.
A P R I L	10	Uncle Odyssey (No Good 欧吉桑)	順效投資股份有限公司, 文化內容策進院, 龍英投資有限公司, 萬騰文化創意股份有限公司, 聯合出品公司, 自由海豚影像館, King Kong Media Production	Chang Ching-feng (director)	
M A Y	13	Nagi Notes	Hassaku Lab, Survivance, Momo Film Co, Star Sands, Nathan Studio, Wonderstruck	Koji Fukada (writer-director), Takako Matsu, Kenichi Matsuyama, Shizuka Ishibashi, Kawaguchi Waku, Kiyora Fujiwara, Sawako Fujima, Ron Mizuma, Shin Seo-gye	
M A Y	19	9 Temples to Heaven	Kick The Machine Films, At A Time, E&W Films, petit chaos, Needle in the Haystack	Sompot Chidgasornpongse (director)	
M A Y	27	Dream Stall (梦想小店)	mm2 Entertainment, Plannette	Annette Lee (director)	
J U N E	7	Ephemera (浮浮游游)	Sporadic Writing School, Seesaw Productions, Cineaste Production House, Some Studios, Tiny Volcano Studio	Shan Jiang (writer-director)	
J U N E	11	Garuda: Dare to Dream	BASE Entertainment, KAWI Animation, Springboard, BolaLob, AHHA Production, BRD Studio, PK Films, Dasun Pictures, Barunson E&A, IFI Sinema, Arendi, Robot Playground Media	Ronny Gani (director)	
J U N E	22	The Violinist	Robot Playground Media, TV ON Producciones, Altri Occhi	Ervin Han, Raúl García (directors)	

== July–September ==
Opening		Title	Production company	Cast and crew	Ref.
A U G U S T	9	Trace Project	FizzDragon	FizzDragon (director team)	
A U G U S T	10	Thính Giác (Hearing)	Sensory Ocean Films, E&W Films, Kongchak Pictures	Lê Bảo (writer-director)	
A U G U S T	13	Magic Atlas (魔法星图)	Trail Mix Media, Pi Animation Studio	Sun Xun (director)	
A U G U S T	14	The House on the Moon	Momo Film Co, Aview Images, Weydemann Bros., 9lb films inc., KawanKawan Media	Nelson Yeo (director)	
A U G U S T	28	Peluru Senja (The Ghost and the Gun)	Films Positive, Limbo Pictures, Viking Sunset Studios, Misfit, Amra Bangladeshi, Auras, LDNO Productions, Felix Studios	Anshul Tiwari (director)	
S E P T E M B E R	7	Yak Mai (The Burning Giants)	Diversion, 13 Little Pictures, Nord-Ouest Films, Sluizer Film Productions	Phuttiphong Aroonpheng (writer-director)	
S E P T E M B E R	13	Four Seasons in Java	Forka Films, Ici et Là Productions, Lemming Film, Storm Films, Brandlink, PFX, Giraffe Pictures	Kamila Andini (writer-director)	
S E P T E M B E R	19	Will You Still Be My Friend (日光)	InLight Film Studio, Verdant Peak Films	Lu Po-Shun (writer-director)	
S E P T E M B E R	24	Bisikan Desa Gringsing (Whispers Of Fatimah)	Mandela Pictures, Oceanus Media Global (OMG Studios)	Ivander Tedjasukmana (writer-director)	

== October-December ==
Opening		Title	Production company	Cast and crew	Ref.
O C T O B E R	8	Pace (脚踏实地)	Clover Films, Dropkick, Throne Inc., Ember, Karawan Pictures	Jonathan Choo (writer-director)	
O C T O B E R	26	On Memories of Countless Days Away (山林記憶)	Cinemovement	Elysa Wendi, Liao Jiekai (directors)	
