= Temporary =

Temporary or Temporaries may refer to:

- Temporaries, also titled Richelieu, a 2023 Canadian drama film directed by Pier-Philippe Chevigny
- Temporary, a TV series created by Cyrina Fiallo and Chrissie Fit in 2017
- "Temporary" (song), a song by Eminem from the 2024 album The Death of Slim Shady
- "Temporary", a song by 6lack from the 2023 album Since I Have a Lover
- Temporary (album), a 2025 studio album by Everything Is Recorded

== See also ==
- Temp (disambiguation), short for "temporary"
