= Temp =

Temp or Temps may refer to:

- Temperature
  - Weather, by association
- Temporary file, in computing
  - Temporary folder
  - Temporary variable
- Temp track, or temp score or temp music, audio used during editing of TV and film production
- Temp, a temporary worker, a person engaged in temporary work
- Temp., for tempore, denoting a period during which a person whose exact lifespan is unknown
- Temp (air base), on Kotelny Island, Russia
- TEMP (meteorology), a meteorological code for upper air soundings
- Test and evaluation master plan, in project management
- Persol Holdings, rebranded from Temp Holdings, a Japanese human resource management company
- RT-21 Temp 2S, a Soviet intercontinental ballistic missile
- TR-1 Temp, a Soviet mobile theatre ballistic missile
- Temps, a musical collective founded by comedian James Acaster

== See also ==
- The Temp (disambiguation)
- Template (disambiguation)
- Tempe, Arizona, a city in the U.S.
- Tempo, the speed or pace of a piece of music
- Time (French: temps)
- El Temps, a Valencian news magazine
- Le Temps (disambiguation)
- Ephemeral (disambiguation)
- Ephemera (disambiguation)
