= Ephemera (disambiguation) =

Ephemera is transitory written and printed matter.

Ephemera may also refer to:

== Music ==
- Ephemera (band), an all-female Norwegian pop music group
- Ephemera (Pepper Adams album)
- Ephemera (Little Green Cars album)
- "Ephemera", a song by the band Delphic, featured on Acolyte.
- "Ephemera", a song by Caligula's Horse from the album Moments from Ephemeral City
- "Ephemera", a song by Kamelot from the album The Awakening

== Other uses ==
- Ephemera (Dungeons & Dragons) a group of creatures in the Dungeons & Dragons fantasy setting
- Ephemera (mayfly), a genus of mayfly
- Ephemera (film), a 2026 independent romantic drama film

== See also ==
- Ephemeral (disambiguation)
- Ephemeris, a publication giving the positions of astronomical objects in the sky
- Ephemeron, a data structure
- Plectrohyla ephemera, a species of frog
- Temp (disambiguation)
