= Ephemeral (disambiguation) =

Ephemerality is the quality of existing only briefly.

Ephemeral may also refer to:

- Ephemeral messaging, images or text that self-deletes a short time after receipt, or upon viewing by the recipient
- Ephemeral (EP), a 2009 EP by Pelican
- Ephemeral, a 2013 EP by Insomnium
- Ephemeral, a 2019 album by Mr.Kitty
- Ephemeral, a 1997 album by Synæsthesia (Canadian band)
- Ephemeral, the 100th episode of Miraculous: Tales of Ladybug & Cat Noir.
- An ephemeral port is a short-lived transport protocol port for Internet Protocol (IP) communications
- An ephemeral plant is a plant with a very short life cycle or very short period of active growth

== See also ==
- Ephemera (disambiguation)
- Ephemeron, a data structure
- Ephemeris, a publication giving the positions of astronomical objects in the sky
- Temp (disambiguation)
