= A New Dawn (film) =

Anime film by Yoshitoshi Shinomiya

- Theatrical release poster

Japanese name
- Kanji: 花緑青が明ける日に
- Literal meaning: The Day Paris Green Dawns
Transcriptions
- Revised Hepburn: Hanarokushō ga Akeru Hi ni
- Directed by: Yoshitoshi Shinomiya
- Written by: Yoshitoshi Shinomiya
- Produced by: Fumie Takeuchi; Pierre Baussaron; Emmanuel-Alain Raynal
- Starring: Riku Hagiwara; Kotone Furukawa; Miyu Irino; Takashi Okabe
- Cinematography: Anna Tomizaki
- Edited by: Megumi Uchida
- Music by: Shūta Hasunuma
- Production companies: Asmik Ace; Miyu Productions; Studio Outrigger
- Distributed by: Asmik Ace
- Release dates: February 18, 2026 (Berlinale); March 6, 2026 (Japan)
- Running time: 76 minutes
- Countries: Japan; France
- Language: Japanese

A New Dawn (Japanese: 花緑青が明ける日に, Hepburn: Hanarokushō ga Akeru Hi ni; lit. 'The Day Paris Green Dawns') is a 2026 animated drama film written and directed by Yoshitoshi Shinomiya. As shown in the sample storyboard within the official pamphlet on page 15, the original title was 新しい夜明け (lit. A New Dawn).

A New Dawn was animated by Studio Outrigger, who produced with Asmik Ace and Miyu Productions. It stars Riku Hagiwara, Kotone Furukawa, Miyu Irino, and Takashi Okabe. The film had its world premiere at the main competition of the 76th Berlin International Film Festival on February 18, 2026, where it was nominated for the Golden Bear. It was released nationwide in Japan by Asmik Ace on March 6.

== Plot ==
The story of A NEW DAWN revolves around Taitou Fireworks, a fireworks factory that is about to be closed and evicted from the site where it has done business for 330 years. The story focuses on two days in the lives of three young people who lived and grew up near the factory and their encounter with Shuhari, a legendary "ghost fireworks shop".

== Voice cast ==
Character	Japanese	English
Keitarō Tatewaki	Riku Hagiwara	TBA
Kaoru Shikimori	Kotone Furukawa	TBA
Sentarō Tatewaki	Miyu Irino	TBA
Keitarō's father	Takashi Okabe	TBA

== Production ==
In April 2024, it was reported that Yoshitoshi Shinomiya would be writing and making his directorial debut on a new anime film, internationally co-produced by Japan and France, titled A New Dawn. In March 2025, Riku Hagiwara, Kotone Furukawa, Miyu Irino, and Takashi Okabe joined the cast.

== Release ==
A New Dawn had its world premiere in competition at the 76th Berlin International Film Festival on February 18, 2026, before its Japan premiere on February 24. It was later released nationwide in Japan on March 6, 2026.

== Reception ==
The film won the Contrechamp Jury Award at the 2026 Annecy International Animation Film Festival.
