= The Violinist =

- Directed by: Ervin Han; Raúl García
- Written by: Ervin Han; Jordan Katherine See
- Starring: Tan Kheng Hua; Ayden Sng; Fang Rong; Adrian Pang; Tanabe Kazuya; Enrique Arce
- Music by: Ricky Ho; Isabel Latorre
- Production companies: Robot Playground Media; TV ON Producciones; Altri Occhi
- Distributed by: Golden Village Pictures (Singapore); Wanda Visión (Spain)
- Release dates: June 2026 (Annecy); 17 September 2026 (Singapore); 13 November 2026 (Spain)
- Running time: 95 minutes
- Countries: Singapore; Spain; Italy
- Language: English

The Violinist is a 2026 animated period drama film directed by Ervin Han and Raúl García.

== Summary ==
The film spans eight decades of Singaporean history, following two musically gifted childhood friends in colonial Singapore whose lives are upended by World War II and the subsequent Japanese occupation.

== Production ==
The Violinist is a three-way multinational co-production between Singapore's Robot Playground Media, Spain's TV ON Producciones, and Italy's Altri Occhi.

== Release ==
Crew of The Violinist attending the 2026 Seminci

France TV Distribution handled international sales. The film world premiered at the 2026 Annecy International Animation Film Festival, where it won the Best Film category.

Following its Gala Premiere at the Capitol Theatre on 3 September 2026, The Violinist was released nationwide in Singapore cinemas on 17 September 2026. It was presented in competition at the 71st Valladolid International Film Festival (Seminci) on 26 October 2026. Wanda Visión is scheduled to release theatrically the film in Spain on 13 November 2026.

== Reception ==
Wendy Ide of ScreenDaily deemed the film to be an "unapologetically old-fashioned and extremely sincere blend of melodrama and wartime thriller".

Juan Pando of Fotogramas rated the film 4 out of 5 stars, lauding its ability to stir emotions in the audience.

== Accolades ==
Year	Award	Category	Nominee(s)	Result	Ref.
2026	2026 Annecy International Animation Film Festival	Cristal For Best Film		Won	
2026	19th Asia Pacific Screen Awards	Best Animated Film		Won	
2026	17th Hollywood Music in Media Awards	Best Original Score — Animated Film	Ricky Ho	Nominated	
2026	9th Lola Gaos Awards	Best Animation Film		Pending	
2026	9th Lola Gaos Awards	Best Original Score	Isabel Latorre Sáez, Ricky Ho	Pending	
2026	32nd Forqué Awards	Best Animation Film		Pending	
2026	63rd Golden Horse Awards	Best Animated Feature	Ervin Han, Raúl García	Won	
2026	63rd Golden Horse Awards	Best Adapted Screenplay	Ervin Han, Jordan Katherine See	Won	

== Reactions ==
During the National Day Rally 2026, Singapore Prime Minister Lawrence Wong commended the producer/director Ervin Han's perseverance in producing this film over a decade without giving up despite multiple setbacks. He also announced that Ervin had 'done Singapore proud' for being the first Singaporean production that won the top prize at the Annecy International Animation Film Festival.

Chinese Ambassador to Singapore Cao Zhongming was invited by Singaporean Chinese language newspaper Lianhe Zaobao to the Mandarin-language premiere of The Violinist in Singapore. He described the film as having "a moving story, sincere emotions, and delicate execution", adding that its background music was "particularly well-produced and impressive".

== See also ==
- List of Singaporean films of 2026
- List of Spanish films of 2026
