= That Night (2025 film) =

2025 documentary film by Hoda Sobhani

- Directed by: Hoda Sobhani
- Screenplay by: Jack Rowles; Robert Wallace *
- Story by: Neda Naji
- Produced by: Hoda Sobhani; Elle Toussi; Suzanne Kianpour
- Narrated by: Neda Naji
- Edited by: Alex Ezorsky; Michael Flowe
- Music by: Benjamin Sturley
- Animation by: Beatriz Felix
- Release date: November 14, 2025
- Running time: 11 minutes
- Country: United States
- Languages: Persian; English

That Night is a 2025 American/Iranian documentary film directed by Hoda Sobhani, with story and narration by Neda Naji, who relates her personal experience in an Iranian prison. The film was released on November 14, 2025.

== Production ==
Director/producer Hoda Sobhani, a filmmaker, a friend of Naji, and a member of the Iranian diaspora, said she made the film to "amplify" the voices of the victims of the Iranian regime, especially the prisoners of Evin Prison.

Citing "dangers posed by the repressive Iranian regime," Sobhani decided that creating a traditional documentary would be impossible -- instead choosing animation to present those experiences "creatively and safely," and make the focus on the "human" aspect of the story, rather than abstract headlines and statistics.

Sobhani said her goal was to "foster empathy and [to] inspire" -- among "the Iranian diaspora" and throughout "the international community" -- "recognition" for "the sacrifices made [by protesters] for freedom and human rights," hoping the film would "galvanize support and encourage action" that would result in "a more just and free society."

== Plot ==
In Iran, during the 2022 "Woman, Life, Freedom" movement, thousands of Iranians were imprisoned, tortured, and/or killed by the authorities and their surrogates. Among the imprisoned was Neda Naji, an Iranian woman who was held in Evin Prison in Teheran. A fatal fire erupted at the prison, on the night of October 15, 2022, while Naji was there. She survived, and was eventually released from the prison, later leaving Iran. The animated film is her prisoner's-view account of the event and surrounding events, detailing what she and her fellow prisoners endured, and how they survived.

== Recognition and reception ==
That Night has been selected for presentation at various film festivals, including:

- 41st Santa Barbara International Film Festival
- Annecy International Animation Film Festival
- "She Stories" film festival, DOC NYC
- 53rd Athens International Film + Video Festival
- Denver Film Festival's "Women+Film Festival" program

Journalist-commentator Christiane Amanpour, in her television segment about the film, interviewing the director, described the film as "powerful".

In reviewing the film, the Italian newspaper La Voce described it as "not just a film, [but] an archive of living memory... a complaint that transcends borders," and especially "an urgent record for the world."
