= Ling Cage =

- Also known as: Ling Cage: INCARNATION
- 灵笼
- Genre: sci-fi,Action
- Created by: Dong Xiangbo 董相博; Ruan Rui 阮瑞; Chen Wei 陈威 (S1); Wang Chenwei 汪晨微(S2)
- Directed by: Dong Xiangbo 董相博
- Music by: Yang Bingyin 杨秉音
- Country of origin: China
- Original language: Mandarin Chinese
- No. of seasons: 2
- No. of episodes: 28

Production
- Executive producers: Chenwei 陈威 (S1); Zhang Shengyan 张圣宴; Luo Yanyan 骆艳艳 (S1)
- Animator: YHKT Entertainment
- Running time: 30–40 min. approx. (no ads)
- Production company: YHKT Entertainment

Original release
- Network: Bilibili
- Release: July 13, 2019

Ling Cage (Chinese: 灵笼, pinyin: líng lóng) is an original sci-fi action animation series produced by YHKT Entertainment (艺画开天, yì huà kāi tiān). Created and directed by Dong Xiangbo, Season 1 was released on July 13, 2019 on Bilibili. Season 2 was released on the same platform on May 23, 2025. Across its two seasons, Ling Cage explores power, identity, and the cost of survival in a world reshaped by disaster. YHKT Entertainment has announced that the third season is expected to be released in 2026.

== Premise ==
In the future, as humans continue to advance their technologies, a sudden catastrophic geological change arrives, leaving the Earth's surface in ruins. Decades later, Mana Ecosystem, a biological network of monstrous, mutated creatures, takes over the land. Earth is believed to be unsurvivable. A group of people who were on a giant flying fort survived the disaster. They named the fort — Lighthouse. However, survival on Lighthouse depends on strict social hierarchy and regulation. Citizens are divided into upper and lower levels based on their genetic quality, and order is maintained through three core doctrines: gene optimization, collective education, and elder expedition.

== Setting ==
=== Lighthouse (introduced in S1) ===
In the Old World, Lighthouse was originally called Tartarus. It was an aerial prison over the North Pole. It held felons, individuals powerful enough to escape law, secret agents, and researchers in mind areas. After escaping the geological catastrophe on the ground, the first Lighthouse Master eased the conflict between guards and prisoners. Tartarus was renovated into Lighthouse, meaning the hope for humanity's future. Initially, Lighthouse unconditionally took in survivors from the ground. After the invasion by surface forces in Lighthouse Year 5, Lighthouse shifted to a conditional rescue policy. In Year 11, Lighthouse confirmed the ground surface was not suitable for human survival.

After years of development and facing the crisis of resource shortage, Lighthouse issued the Three Core Doctrines: gene optimization, collective education, and elder expedition. Citizens are divided into upper and lower levels based on their genetic quality. The upper citizens (superiors) hold key social roles, while the lower ones (laborers) perform tedious manual labor in exchange for limited resources.

==== The Hunters ====
Specialized unit in charge of gathering resources from the Earth's surface. The team is equipped with heavy firepower and Heavy-Duty Mechas to fight the Extremozoans.

==== Light and Shadow Society ====
Religious institution on Lighthouse. It worships The Lord of Light and Shadow. In charge of enforcing the Three Core Doctrines and punishing those who violate the regulations. The doctrine of the church is: "Light breeds all living, all living follow shadow. Light cleans my soul, shadow shields my body. Using ethics to suppress desire, joy but not dissipated. Rather to give up my body, but to follow light and shadow."

==== Lighthouse Defense Force ====
The military and security body in charge of maintaining order and operational stability within Lighthouse.

==== Ecology Research Institute ====
Research organization studying Mana Ecosystem and its biological mechanisms.

==== Laborer ====
Residents who fail to meet the genetic-quality standard. Perform labor work and live in the hanging lower levels of Lighthouse known as the Pigeon Cage.

=== LongGu Village (introduced in S2) ===
A place founded and led by Bai Yuekui, housing hundreds of people. The village accepts ground survivors and does not control villagers' emotions. Here, people can form families. The eligible couples who pass the parental test are permitted to reproduce. The villagers train to manipulate their inner Life Substance, transform it into power that one can control. There are three steps to reach Substance Potential: generate intent-force, compress Life Substance, and initiate potential power. Those who activate Life Substance power are called Awakeners. Through practice, the villagers can hide their presence from Extremozoans by entering the Guiyuan mode. The village uses Shielded Towers to keep the Extremozoans away. The towers have frequency filters to capture the special magnetic field released by an unknown source and use plasma emitters to magnify the field.

=== Mana Ecosystem (introduced in S1) ===
After the catastrophic geological change, a new ecosystem, Mana, emerged. Extremozoans surfaced from beneath the Earth's crust. Mana produces Scarlet Pheromone (腥荭素) that will cause hallucinations in humans and threaten human lives. The Extremozoans (噬极兽) in Mana subtract Life Substance from humans and then deliver gathered Life Substance to Mana Flora, which will then deliver the substances to the entire ecosystem, driving Mana evolution. It is said that the key to defeating Mana lies at its center, where only Mana creatures can enter. The Extremozoans can generate energy through photosynthesis.

== Characters and Voice Cast ==
=== Main ===
==== The Hunters ====
- Marc (马克, mǎ kè). S1 voice by Li Yuantao 李元韬, S1 youth voice by Jiang Jingju 蔣靜菊, S2 voice by Tutehameng 图特哈蒙, S2 youth voice by Ye Zhiqiu 叶知秋. Superior, commander of the Hunters, widely respected by the public. During one collection operation, he is betrayed by 4068 and parasitized by a Spinal Centipede. After surgery, he mutates into a combination of human and mana creature. Believed to be the key to defeating Mana Ecosystem.
- Ran Bing (冉冰, rǎn bīng). Voice by Tao Dian 陶典. Superior. The Hunters' top sniper and Marc's lieutenant. Casual in demeanor but highly perceptive.
- Mo Cheng (墨城, mò chéng). S1 voice by Zhong Wei 钟巍, S2 voice by Gu Jiangshan 谷江山. Superior, responsible for scouting and skilled at operating vehicles in complex environments. Capable of close-combat engagement with Extremozoans without Heavy-Duty Mecha.
- Erika (艾丽卡, ài li kǎ). S1 voice by Bao Xiaoqi 包小柒, S2 voice by Shen Nianru 沈念如. Superior. Heavy-Duty Mecha operator providing heavy fire support and defense.
- Jeff (杰夫, jié fū). Voice by Su Xin 苏鑫. Superior. Heavy-Duty Mecha operator specializing in medium-range fire support and assistance.
- Fei Xue (飞雪, fēi xuě). S1 voice by Chong Chong 虫虫, S2 voice by Duan Yixuan 段艺璇. Superior. Heavy-Duty Mecha operator skilled in long-range precision fire.
- Elon (埃隆, āi lóng). S1 voice by Cheng Yuzhu 程玉珠, S2 voice by Liu Ruoban 刘若班. Superior. Instructor of the Hunters and in charge of population control and education on Lighthouse. Sent on the elder expedition in S1.
- Kun Jie (昆杰, kūn jié). S1 voice by Liu Shengbo 刘圣博, S2 voice by Liu Cong 刘琮. Hunter, Hong Kou's former teammate.
- Carol (卡罗, kǎ luó). Introduced in S2. Voice by Tang Zhouchen 汤舟沉. Superior. Skilled in using a butterfly knife.
- Xien (西恩, xī ēn). Introduced in S2. Voice by Zhang Enze 张恩泽. Superior.
- Su Li (苏黎, sū lí). Introduced in S2. Voice by He Wenxiao 贺文潇. Superior.

==== Church of Light and Shadow ====
- Charles (查尔斯, chá ěr sī). S1 voice by Liang Dawei 梁达伟, S2 voice by Teng Xin 藤新, S2 youth voice by Jiang Yingjun 姜英俊. Bishop of Light and Shadow Society. Son of Morgen. Was seriously injured by unconscious mutated Marc and infected with Scarlet Phermone. Lost his left arm and right eye.
- Fan Di (梵蒂, fán dì). S1 voice by Yang Menglu 杨梦露, S2 voice by Chang Rongshan 常蓉珊. Binger of the Light in charge of law enforcement. Loyal only to Charles.
- Sharif (沙力夫, shā lì fū). Voice by Ma Yang 马洋. Executioner of Light and Shadow Society, nicknamed Big Dog.
- Bree (布里, bù lǐ). S1 voice by Meng Xianglong 孟祥龙, S2 voice by Qiao Muxin 乔木心. Chief Prayer of Light and Shadow Society.
- Fan Lyu (梵律, fán lyù). Introduced in S2. Voice by Gong Dafang 巩大方. Bringer of the Light, takes care of Charles.

==== Lighthouse Defense Force ====
- Morgen (摩根, mó gēn). S1 voice by Zhang Xin 张欣, S2 voice by Zhao Mingzhou 赵铭洲. Master of Lighthouse. He proposed and issued the Three Core Doctrines.
- Victor (维克多, wéi kè duō). S1 voice by Meng Xianglong 孟祥龙. S2 voice by Tang Shuiyu 汤水雨. Commander of Lighthouse Defense Force, reports directly to Morgen.
- Jing Nan (镜南, jìng nán). S1 voice by Huang Ying 黄莺, S2 voice by Ji Guanlin 季冠霖. Morgan's adopted daughter. Chief commander of Navigation Control Room, overseeing Lighthouse flight operations and route planning.
- Senger (森格, sēn gé). S1 voice by Liu Shengbo 刘圣博, S2 voice by Fan Zhechen 范哲琛. Captain of Lighthouse Defense Force. In S2 promoted to Commander of Defense Force.
- Jessica (杰西卡, jié xī kǎ). S1 voice by Zong Cong 宗琮, S2 voice by Nie Xiying 聂曦映. Head of Innovation Center. Expert in Heavy-Duty Mecha design.

==== Lowborns ====
- 4068/Sui Ying (随影, suí yǐng). S1 voice by Xu Xiang 徐翔, S2 voice by Liu Mingyue 刘明月. A laborer who aspires to become a Hunter. Lured by Charles with the promise of becoming a superior. After completing the task, he becomes a superior and the new commander of the Hunters.
- 4277. S1 voice by Huang Ying 黄莺, S2 voice by Tang Xiaoxi 唐小喜. Laborer, a young woman who loves old-world objects. Friend of 4068 and 4079.
- 4079. S1 voice by Hu Yi 胡艺, S2 voice by Li Qingyang 李轻扬. Laborer, a smooth-talking young man. Friend of 4068 and 4277.
- 8925. S1 voice by Yao Sujuan 姚苏娟, S2 voice by Yan Meme 阎么么. Young laborer. 9033 and 9027's friend. Follows Sui Ying in S2.

==== Others on Lighthouse ====
- Carrie (嘉莉, jiā lì). S1 voice by Zhang Hui 张惠, S2 voice by Liu Qianhan 刘芊含. Head of Medicine and Ecology Department, in charge of studying Mana Ecosystem and Linyuan Armor.
- Ewan (尤恩, yóu èn). Introduced in S2. Voice by Wang Chenguang 王晨光. Head of Resource Allocation.
- Flin (弗林, fú lín). Introduced in S2. Elder voice by Gao Zengzhi 高增志, middle-aged voice by Lin Qiang 林强. Superior. Former Clotho researcher.

==== LongGu Village ====
- Bai Yuekui (白月魁, bái yuè kuí). Voice by Xia Yike 夏一可. Brain scientist in the old world. After surviving the catastrophe, she discovers how Life Substance can be converted into controllable power. Leader of LongGu village, aiming to defeat Mana.
- Xia Dou (夏豆, xià dòu). S1 voice by Cai Shujing 蔡书瑾, S2 voice by Gong Dafang 巩大方. Awakener. Young girl who is able to hack into Extremozoan's mind and control its movement with a gamepad-shaped controller.
- Sui Xing (碎星, suì xīng). S1 voice by Yao Sujuan 姚苏娟, S2 voice by Zhang Yuxi 张雨曦. Natural-born villager. Awakener. Archer with extreme perception and accuracy.
- Shan Da (山大, shān dà). S1 voice by Jia Qiu 贾邱, S2 voice by Zhang Zhankun 张占坤. Awakener. Able to generate concentrated Life Substance. Xia Hua's husband.
- Gua Yan (寡言, guǎ yán). S1 voice by Wang Yuhang 王宇航, S2 voice by Zhang Ruobing 张若冰. Awakener. Has non-Newtonian fluid cells capable of absorbing attack.
- Xu Tong (胥童, xū tóng). S1 voice by Sun Ye 孙晔, S2 voice by Liu Zhenyan 刘真颜. Awakener. A skinny man in mask, able to absorb Mana substance.
- Nan Jixing (南极星, nán jí xīng). Introduced in S2. Voice by Xiao Tan 笑谈. Living Resource Organizer at LongGu Village.
- Xia Tianlai (夏天来, xià tiān lái). Introduced in S2. Voice by Guo Zhengjian 郭政建. Researcher of Life Substance at LongGu Village.
- Wulan Maiduo (乌兰麦朵, wū lán mài duǒ). Introduced in S2. Voice by Xu Jiaqi 徐佳琦. Awakener. Natural-born villager. Able to share eyesight with her pet Cha Gai and communicate with animals, good at using spear.
- Jiu Ge (酒歌, jiǔ gē). Introduced in S2. Voice by Ding Shiying 丁诗莹. Awakener. Able to heal others through kiss.
- Qian Li (千里, qiān lǐ). Introduced in S2. Voice by Shi Bei 石贝. Awakener. Taken in by the village. Able to materialize Life Substance for defense.
- Ahmuer (阿沐尔, ā mù ěr). Introduced in S2. Voice by Miao Zhuang 苗壮. Awakener. Able to generate high-frequency sound.
- Shan Shihui (山石灰, shān shí huī). Introduced in S2. Voice by Zhao Shuang 赵爽. Student at LongGu Village. Son of Shan Da and Xia Hua.
- Jiang Ya (姜雅, jiāng yǎ). Introduced in S2. Voice by Jiang Yingjun 姜英俊. Student at LongGu Village.
- Qiu Shi (秋实, qiū shí). Introduced in S2. Voice by Zhang Lu 张璐. Principal of LongGu School.
- Wulan Aodeng (乌兰敖登, wū lán áo dēng). Introduced in S2. Voice by Ye Baohua 叶保华. Guiyuan status instructor at LongGu Village. Wulan Maiduo's father.
- Kholova (科洛娃, kē luò wá). Introduced in S2. Voice by Cai Na 蔡娜. Awakener. Able to submerge into and manipulate water. In love with Po Kong.
- Po Kong (破空, pò kōng). Introduced in S2. Voice by Lyu Kong 吕空. Awakener. Able to generate electric force.
- Pelienkhov (别连科夫, bié lián kē fū). Introduced in S2. Voice by Wan Li 万力. Weapons builder.
- Wulan Haisang (乌兰海桑, wū lán hǎi sāng). Introduced in S2. Voice by Guo Haoran 郭浩然. Awakener. Wulan Maiduo's elder brother.

=== Recurring ===
==== Introduced in S1 ====
- Penny(佩妮, pèi nī). Voice by Tang Yajing 唐雅菁. Hunter. Longs for the old-world order and has a crush on Donny.
- Donny (唐尼, táng ní). Voice by Yang Yang 杨旸. Hunter.
- 1225. Voice by Zhang Hui 张惠. Lighthouse laborer. Hopes to use her heart to save her seriously injured husband Luke, a superior.
- Corey (科里, kē lǐ). Voice by Liu Shengbo 刘圣博. Hunter and Heavy-Duty Mecha operator.
- Hong Kou (红蔻, hóng kòu) Voice by Tang Yajing 唐雅菁. Marc's foster sister. Former Hunter commander. Executed for her relationship with Po Xiao.
- Po Xiao (破晓, pòxiǎo). Voice by An Zhi 安志. Hunter, Hong Kou's lieutenant. Executed for his relationship with Hong Kou.
- 9033. Voice by Hua Ling 花玲. Girl inferior. Friend of 8925 and 9027. Has genetic disease.
- 9027. Voice by Tang Yajing 唐雅菁. Boy inferior. Friend of 8925 and 9033.
- Xue Feng (雪峰, xuě fēng). Voice by Huang Xianjun 黄贤骏. Hunter, Hong Kou's former teammate.
- Gavin (盖文, gài wén). Voice by Li Yang 李洋. Hunter, Hong Kou's former teammate.
- Hadji (哈吉, hā jí). Voice by Ling Quan Ye Yue 冷泉夜月. Hunter, Hong Kou's former teammate.
- Gog (高格, gāo gé). Voice by Li Chengyuan 李程远. Hunter, Hong Kou's former teammate.
- 0609. Voice by Huang Xianjun 黄贤骏. Oldest laborer on Lighthouse.
- Lottie (洛蒂, luò dì). Voice by Xu Hui 徐慧. General practitioner at Superior Medical Area.
- Fang Ning (方宁, fāng níng). Voice by Tang Yajing 唐雅菁. Hunter.
- Jade (洁德, jié dé). S1 voice by Pan Danni 潘丹妮, S2 voice by Chu Yue 楚越. Hunter.
- Lita (丽塔, lì tǎ). S1 voice by Yao Sujuan 姚苏娟, S2 voice by Yan Yeqiao 闫夜桥. Hunter.
- Jianjian (健健, jiàn jiàn). S1 voice by Cai Shujing 蔡书瑾, S2 voice by Zhang Biyu 张碧玉. Intelligent medical robot produced by Nirvana Company.
- Luke (鲁克, lú kè). Voice by Su Xin 苏鑫. Originally superior, 1225's husband in the old world.
- Ahfu (阿福, ā fú). S2 voice by Qiao Muxin 乔木心. Hunter and Heavy-Duty Mecha operator.

==== Introduced in S2 ====
- Er Tong (二筒, èr tǒng). Voice by Li Chengfeng 李乘风. LongGu villager. Awakener. Training Creature Repairer, able to turn invisible.
- Xia Hua (夏花, xià huā). Voice by Tang Yuhe 唐雨荷. LongGu villager. Awakener. Shan Da's wife.
- Fang Yuan (方圆, fāng yuán). Voice by Qiao Shiyu 乔诗语. LongGu villager. Awakener.
- Tasia (塔西娅, tǎ xī yǎ). Voice by Xie Yihui 谢轶辉. Natural-born LongGu villager and researcher. Awakener. Able to teleport and good at using revolver.
- Dulu (嘟噜, dū lǔ). Voice by Wu Yongye 吴永业. LongGu villager who runs an arcade room.
- Mana Origin. Voice by Yang Rui 杨瑞. The giant entity that breeds the Mana system. Attempts to persuade Marc to become part of Mana.
- Wu Men (无门, wú mén). Voice by Qiao Yaohui 乔耀辉. LongGu villager. Awakener. Able to penetrate objects.
- Bai Yuetian (白月天, bái yuè tiān). Voice by Li Qingyang 李轻扬. Bai Yuekui's elder brother, whose mind has been transferred to the cloud.
- Siltar (希尔达, xī ěr dá). Voice by Zhong Ke 钟可. Defense Force soldier.
- Holland (奥兰德, ào lán dé). Voice by Wang Qingyao 王清曜. Defense Force soldier.
- Hong Lu (红鹭, hóng lù). Voice by Wang Xiaoqian 王潇倩. Former Defense Force commander. Hong Kou's elder sister.
- Mei Wei (梅薇, méi wēi). Voice by Ji Guanlin 季冠霖. Former Minister of Civil Affairs. Morgen's wife.
- Drake (德雷克, dé léi kè). Voice by Guo Haoran 郭浩然. Former head of the Department of Justice.

== Episodes ==
Season	Episodes	Originally released	
Season	Episodes	First released	Last released
1	16	July 13, 2019	May 15, 2021
2	12	May 23, 2025	August 1, 2025

=== Season 1 (2019—2021) ===
No. overall	No. in season	Title	Original release date
1	1	"EPISODE 001"	July 13, 2019
Due to resource shortage on Lighthouse, Marc and his team are sent to the R-49 Spaceship Site on the Australia-Asia New Continent. During the mission, laborer 4068 draws the attention of a Spinal Centipede while attempting to retrieve a watch from a corpse, triggering an attack. In the chaos, Donny is exposed to Scarlet Pheromone, causing him to see illusions and accidentally kill Penny. The gunfire quickly attracts Extremozoans. Marc and Ran Bing cover the rest of the team to evacuate from the site with the required supplies. On Lighthouse, laborer 1225 sneaks into the Main Hall of Light and Shadow Society during a prayer ceremony. 1225 begs Charles for permission to donate her heart to her husband, a superior, to save his life. The Society refuses her request and sends her out.
2	2	"EPISODE 002"	July 27, 2019
The Hunters receive a warm welcome upon returning to Lighthouse, especially Marc. While the laborers are unloading the resources in the Resource Distribution Chamber, 4068 argues with Jeff, who accuses 4068 of touching Hunter weapons as a laborer. Fan Di, a Bringer of the Light, sentences 4068 to twelve floggings. Marc intervenes to stop future punishment on 4068. Marc and Ran Bing later attend the central meeting to deliver their mission report as other department heads give updates on each section. During the briefing, Charles questions Marc about whether the heavy casualties this time resulted from the Hunters’ negligence. Marc briefs on the mission. As Lighthouse hadn’t figured out how to kill Extremozoans permanently, the team suffered severe loss even under the support of fierce firepower and Heavy-Duty Mechas. But this time, they have a huge discovery about the ground environment.
3	3	"EPISODE 003"	August 10, 2019
After the Hunters retrieved from the site, they continued battling the Extremozoans. 4068 managed to enter and operate a Heavy-Duty Mecha and helped a car of laborers escape under Mo Cheng and Fei Xue’s covering fire. Marc cut down several Extremozoans, but the creatures revived after a short time. However, Marc’s effort bought time for the rest of the team to retreat. On their way back to Lighthouse, Marc and Ran Bing saw a white-haired woman in black heels standing atop a huge Extremozoan. At the central meeting, Marc reports the fast evolution of Extremozoans and the existence of humankind on the ground surface. Everyone is surprised except for Morgen, the Master of Lighthouse. Morgen announces Marc as his successor and will become the new Master in seven days. After the meeting, Morgen asks Marc to safeguard Lighthouse’s future. Marc mentions that Morgen once had a better choice — his sister Hong Kou. Morgen points out that what Hong Kou did violated the Three Core Doctrines. After Marc leaves, Morgen orders Victor to have Carrie resume the Linyuan Armor experiment. Late at night, Marc reflects on Hong Kou, the former Hunter Commander: how she fought fearlessly against Extremozoans, how she took care of him, and how she was executed by Lighthouse for her relationship with her lieutenant, Po Xiao.
4	4	"EPISODE 004"	August 24, 2019
The next morning at the Armament Servicing Room, the hunters undergo their routine training. Elon, instructor of the Hunters, tells Marc that he has been selected for the upcoming elder expedition. Elon warns Marc that compared to Extremozoans, the true danger comes from the minds of humans. The Hunters visit Corey, who was seriously injured from the last operation. They use their credit points to cover his treatment. On her way out, Ran Bing enters the Breeding Corridor, where she witnesses a woman begging to see her newborn just once. Her request is denied without hesitation. Meanwhile, on the lower levels, laborers 4068, 4277, and 4079 gather in one room and share the stolen alcohol and food. 4068 gives 4277 the watch he brought back from the last operation. In the passage of the Fuel Storage Area, two laborers suffering from Scarlet Pheromone Syndrome rob superior's food. Drunk, 4277 interrupts the conflict and tries to stop Fan Di from executing the laborers, but the watch falls out of her pocket. In order to protect his friends, 4068 steps forward. His words catch the attention of Charles, who happens to be passing by.
5	5	"EPISODE 005"	September 7, 2019
Charles questions Morgen why he’s not being selected as the next Master. Morgen explains that the decision was made for the survival of humanity during the apocalypse. Charles pretends to accept his father’s choice, but when Morgen mentions he’ll also pass Light and Shadow Society to Marc, Charles changes his mind. On Lighthouse Lifting Platform, the new elder expedition ceremony takes place. Marc bids farewell to Elon, who tells him that to learn about the past and the ground, he should visit the Data Room where documenter Gordon preserves some information. At night, Marc and Ran Bing sneak into Central Data Room with Jing Nan’s help. They discover that Lighthouse was once called Tartarus, an aerial prison over the North Pole for felons. In the documents, they see a portrait of a short-haired woman similar to the one they saw on the ground. The rest of the document is damaged. To learn more, Marc visits 0609, the eldest laborer on Lighthouse. 0609 recalls that during the ground mission in Year 12, a mysterious silver-haired girl in armor skills the Extremozoan crowd and saved the Hunters on the mission. Morgen, then Hunter commander, invited her to Lighthouse. But soon after, the girl disappeared with the armor. Meanwhile, from Penny’s diary, Ran Bing knows about Penny’s realization of her crush on Donny. As she begins to understand love through Penny’s words, Ran Bing receives a notice about her assigned reproduction mission at Dawn Lobby.
6	6	"EPISODE 006"	September 21, 2019
4068 is sentenced to light torture for violating Lighthouse rules. 4068 explains that he used the Heavy-Duty Mecha only to protect resources. Charles notes that Marc never reported the information, planting the seed of doubt in 4068, who once admired Marc. Charles offers 4068 a superior meal. During their conversation, Charles takes out the watch 4068 gave to 4277. At the Medicine and Ecology Department, Carrie continues her research on Mana. Victor comes and gives her the Linyuan Armor to resume her previous experiment. In the corridor, Ran Bing meets with three inferior children and learns that the girl, 9033, is about to die due to her genetic disease. Hearing her wish to see the entire Lighthouse, Ran Bing takes her on a slider ride. As they pass over the sky farm, turbulence hits, and the slider nearly crashes. Marc rushes in and saves the two. Ran Bing asks Marc what he would do if they had the chance to live on the ground and talks about the old family system, trying to know Marc’s feelings towards her. She confesses her crush on him. Marc chooses not to answer, haunted by the memory of Hong Kou’s death. Ran Bing tells him that she’s going to perform the assigned reproduction mission tonight.
7	7	"The Middle Chapter"	November 17, 2019
Mark recalls his past with Hong Kou and Po Xiao in the training room. Hong Kou once told him that true happiness is living freely on the ground with someone you truly like. 1225 steals a gun and asks Marc to bring her into the Superior Medical Center. Marc rejects her request. 1255 fire a shot into her belly. In her final moments, 1225 tells Marc about her past with her husband on the ground. Touched by her words, Marc asks Lottie to transplant 1225’s heart to her husband. On the other side, Ran Bing enters Dawn Hall to fulfill her reproduction mission. Marc breaks in, only to find Ran Bing has killed everyone in the room and is shivering on the bed. Marc confesses his love for Ran Bing. The two are captured by Senger on their way out. Marc asks to see Morgen, who calls a central meeting following Charles’s suggestion. At the meeting, Marc rebels against Lighthouse’s ruthless living regulations. When Morgen questions how Lighthouse could survive without the rules, Marc proposes his idea of returning to the ground. Morgen, in great fury, claims that the woman Marc saw on the ground cannot be counted as human, which shocks everyone. Marc asks Morgen to send him and Ran Bing on expedition. Morgen suddenly fainted from a heart attack. According to Lighthouse’s rule, Morgen is judged to be unqualified for medical resources under the Life Formula. But believing everyone deserves to live, Marc decides to take on the mission to gather the necessary medicine Morgen needs. The Hunters gather their best equipment and assemble to follow Marc. Marc gives a speech on the right to live, which motivates the crowd. The team departs.
8	8	"EPISODE 007"	July 31, 2020
The Hunters land on the ground, quickly surrounded by Extremozoans. Hong Kou’s former teammates warn Marc that if Light and Shadow Society seizes full control of Lighthouse, Charles will never allow him and Ran Bing to survive. The best choice for Marc is to become the next Master. On the way, the team encounters massive crowds of Snake-dogs and Roarers. Overwhelmed by the aggressive Extremozoans, the Hunters can only buy themselves time by using heavy firepower. On Lighthouse, 9033 is dying. Inspired by what Marc did for 1225, the laborers rush into the Superior Medical Area. Lottie, a general practitioner who has just finished surgery on 1225’s husband, asks Light and Shadow Society to punish her for what she did. At the same time, 0609 is shot by the guards for breaking into the Superior Medical Area. Before dying, 0609 tells Lottie that doctors in the past did not decide who to save based on genes.
9	9	"EPISODE 008"	August 14, 2020
The Hunters arrive at their destination, Nirvana — a deserted biomedical company. The site contains Mana plants but no signs of active Extremozoans. The Hunters split into squads to search for the required medicine, with Squad 2 remaining on standby at the lobby. One squad encounters a laboratory mouse but fails to recognize the creature. They then accidentally activate a leftover 3D projection introducing Nirvana, which focused on biological beauty and anti-aging research. The company was specialized in early-stage cell regeneration technology. Another group, led by the senior Hunters, enters a storage room filled with human replicas for organ sales. They are shocked to find that every replica looks identical to little Marc. On Lighthouse, Jing Nan reports the medical-area incident to Victor. While searching the site, 4068 finds and repairs a medical robot called Jianjian. Jianjian notes telomere abnormality in Marc. Noticing burn damage on 4068, Jianjian guides the squad to the medicine storehouse. However, the storehouse is occupied by Mana Flora. When the other teams return to the lobby, they find it empty except for a huge egg-shaped biomass. It turns out Squad 2 was absorbed by this unknown Mana creature.
10	10	"EPISODE 009"	August 28, 2020
The egg-shaped form is revealed to be part of an Extremozoan, Calyx, which has absorbed Life Substances from Squad 2 members. From the darkness, more Extremozoans, Sharp Eels, emerge. Facing the massive Calyx, Ahfu abandons Lita and retreats. Just as the Calyx is about to swallow Lita, Mark arrives and rescues her. The remaining Hunters launch a new round of attacks under Marc’s command. In the storehouse, 4068 is accidentally scratched and his blood activates Las Morass, which begins hunting the squad. To secure the medicine, the rest of the team closes the gate despite knowing 4068 is still inside. On the battlefield, the Extremozoans reborn and the Sharp Eels help the Calyx complete its final evolution. Facing the fully evolved Calyx, Marc chooses to fight it alone to cover the Hunters' retreat.
11	11	"EPISODE 010"	September 11, 2020
As Marc battles the Calyx, he notices a group of people, led by the white-haired woman, watching from the top of the site. On the ground, a Sharp Eel corpse decays, revealing its damaged core. 4068 escapes from the storehouse through the air duct and reaches the battlefield remains. There, he sees the dead Calyx gripping Marc’s Heavy-Duty Mecha. 4068 climbs up and slashes Marc’s throat. Marc’s blood attracts a Spinal Centipede. The Hunters return and find Marc, but the Extremozoans revive. The white-haired woman leads her team to divert the Extremozoans into another direction using a massive cluster of Life Substance bait. The Hunters rush back to Lighthouse with the medicine and severely injured Marc. On the way, 4068 remembers his conversation with Charles, who used 4277’s life to coerce him into killing Marc during the mission. On Lighthouse, Ran Bing hears about Marc’s injury and rushes to Lifting Platform. The crowd discovers that Marc has been parasitized by the Spinal Centipede. Carrie and her team come and take Marc to the experimental center for emergency surgery. On the ground, the masked man from the mysterious team absorbs Mana fog in Nirvana. The team confronts the Mana Flora.
12	12	"EPISODE 011"	September 25, 2020
Morgen awakens in the Medical Area and learns that Marc brought back the medicine that saved him, making himself the first person to violate the Life Formula. In the lab, Carrie discovers that Marc’s cells are absorbing those of the Spinal Centipede. Morgen orders her to perform surgery on Marc to replace his spinal system with the Spinal Centipede’s, saying Marc will be the hope for Lighthouse to return to the ground. As the medical team tries to kill the Spinal Centipede, it emits cries resembling those of a human baby and even speaks human language. The surgery succeeds, and Marc’s life data stabilizes. Meanwhile, Fan Di promotes 4068 to a superior following Charles’s promise, though his name remains unchanged. On the ground, the Extremozoans seem to sense the change on Lighthouse. Marc’s heartbeat suddenly stops, and he is declared dead by the medical team. The Hunters send his body to the incinerator. After the others leave, Morgen stays in front of the incinerator, regretting that he has failed to uncover the mystery surrounding Marc as his teacher once told him. In the incinerator, Marc is reborn and mutated into a fusion of human and Extremozoan.
13	13	"EPISODE 012"	October 9, 2020
Charles questions Morgen why he showed no surprise when the Spinal Centipede spoke a phrase in Sanskrit, meaning “a greater catastrophe is approaching.” Out from Morgen’s room, Charles becomes the Acting Master and promotes Senger to Vice Commander of Defense Force. He sends clergymen to monitor the original Lighthouse council members. In the lab, Carrie tests Marc’s emotional responses using different pictures, verifying that Marc has preserved his consciousness. Senger orders the Defense squad to use Marc for weapon testing. Overwhelmed by anger during the test, Marc breaks free from the chains. Seeing how original Marc’s gene sequence is different from humankind’s, Carrie realizes why Morgen says Marc is the hope for Lighthouse. She quickly hypnotizes Marc. In Light and Shadow Society’s Main Hall, Ran Bing asks Charles to let her take Marc out of Lighthouse. Charles agrees, on the condition that they complete the expedition ceremony. In the Medical Area, Charles informs Luke that 1225 donated her heart to him and declares that he is now the new 1225. On the ground, the Survivors reveal that the Mana Ecosystem under Lighthouse is about to evolve. Someone called Master Lai has told them that Marc is capable of entering Mana.
14	14	"ENDING·I"	May 1, 2021
Charles was saved by a person covered in a cape from a massive Extremozoan in his childhood, whom he believed to be the Lord of Light and Shadow. During a previous talk, Morgen brought Charles into the Core Control Room, where the Clotho System — a half-biological, half-mechanical brain — was stored. Lighthouse, then Tarturus, was guided by Clotho and escaped the great catastrophe. Hoping to know how to face Mana, the first Master obtained a coordinate from Clotho, where an infant — Marc — was found. Morgen realized that instead of being a great soldier to defeat Mana, Marc may become the bridge between humanity and Mana. Back to the present, on Lifting Platform, the ceremony for Ran Bing and Marc’s expedition is being held. On their way, 1225 rushes to the cloth-covered truck and exposes mutated Marc to the public. Panic erupts in the crowd, causing chaos. Just then, Charles appears and gives the execution order, claiming to follow the public will. Marc is sent to the Burning Execution Arena. As the execution begins, the Hunters intervene and protect Marc, planning to take him to the ground and live together. Just as everything is settled, the Hunters are captured by the Bringers and Executioners from Light and Shadow Society. Charles confesses that 1225, Ran Bing’s reproduction mission, and the assassination of Marc were all his arrangements. Severely wounded, Marc loses his consciousness and is overtaken by his Extremozoan instincts. Ran Bing embraces and calms him, but her Life Substance is absorbed by Marc, turning her into flesh dust. With her Life Substance, Marc recovers from the injury, and his consciousness returns.
15	15	"ENDING·II"	May 5, 2021
In Marc’s memory, little Ran Bing accompanied him to recover from the heartbreak of witnessing Hong Kou’s death. But back in reality, Marc realizes Ran Bing is truly gone. Just as Marc is about to reach Ran Bing’s remains, Sharif shoots Ran Bing into ashes. Marc is irritated and rushes towards Charles. Witnessing Marc’s Extremozoan behavior, Charles realizes why Morgen said Marc could be the bridge between humanity and Mana. Marc kills Sharif and slices off Charles’s left arm. Charles gives the order to capture Marc alive, even at the cost of causing severe damage to Lighthouse. In the chaos, Marc breaks into the Central Control Room and seizes Charles. Charles tells Marc that his emotions make him predictable. He reveals that severe emotional turbulence will cause Life Substance in human bodies to be more detectable for Extremozoans. This is exactly why Morgen published the Three Core Doctrine. Charles tries to convince Marc to join him in uncovering the truth about Mana. Witnessing his companions’ death, 8925 picks up a gun and fires at Marc, questioning why he turns into an Extremozoan and kills everyone. Crushed by guilt and despair, Marc throws himself off Lighthouse. But Jeff catches him with his Heavy-Duty Mecha and protects Marc from the crash. On Lighthouse, people who once supported Marc are captured. The order is restored. The injured are sent on expeditions. Those who want to defy the system jump from the platform.
16	16	"SPECIAL"	May 15, 2021
In Light and Shadow Society, Charles, who is now the new Master, appoints 4068 as the new commander of the Hunters and gives him the name Sui Ying — following shadow. His first mission is to bring Marc back to the Lighthouse. Marc, who has lost his consciousness, enters the Wrong Way Alley, a core Mana area, seemingly drawn by Mana like other Extremozoans. It is the time for the Extremozoans to deliver absorbed Life Substances to Mana. Bai Yuekui and her team are already waiting for Marc. As Mana Flora attempts to absorb Ran Bing’s Life Substance, Marc’s regains his consciousness and resists. His defiance irritates the rest of Extremozoans. Recognizing Marc still has the human side, Bai Yuekui and her team exit Guiyuan mode, using their Life Substance-based powers to combat the Extremozoans. Xia Dou hacks into an Extremozoan’s mind and collaborates with Shan Da, who generates a large wave of Life Substance that interrupts the substance delivery process. Xu Tong marks each Extremozoan’s core, and Sui Xing destroys them with her arrows. To fight back, Mana uses Las Morass to control Marc. As Marc is about to hit Sui Xing, Bai Yuekui intervenes. She uses her expertise in martial arts to defeat Marc and removes Las Morass from his body using an acupuncture jar. The team brings Marc to LongGu Village. Bai Yuekui comforts Marc with her words and persuades Marc to join her plan to crack the Mana Ecosystem. She explains that Marc is the only one who can enter the Mana Core to uncover its secrets. Bai Yuekui shows Marc the village. Here, people can control their emotions and Life Substance, turning it into the power they can utilize. On Lighthouse, Clotho is revived. Within the Mana Core, a new type of Extremozoan is born.

=== Season 2 (2025) ===
No. overall	No. in season	Title	Original release date
17	1	"Eden of the Apocalypse"	May 23, 2025
At LongGu Village, Marc starts his new attempt to activate his Substance Potential to utilize Life Substance. Xia Tianlai and Xiadou assist him by applying electric stimulants, triggering him to enter the Substance-generating state. However, during the process, Marc experiences fragmented first-person memories happened in the old world when the disaster first stuck. Showing unstable body signals, Marc’s attempt again fails. Meanwhile, on Lighthouse, Sui Ying summons the Hunters for a mission to locate Marc. Sui Ying requests the participation of Marc’s former team members and puts bomb-implanted chokers on their neck to ensure their compliance. Marc and the villagers return to LonogGu village.
18	2	"First Waves Arise"	May 23, 2025
Life in LongGu village is peaceful, with villagers practicing different occupations. Shan Shihui challenges Marc to the King of Fighters game and defeats him. When Marc enters a local restaurant, it turns out that he is not welcomed by all villagers. Bai Yuekui tells Marc that his motivation to activate his Substance Potential is not enough from just regretting what he did to Ran Bing. Bai Yuekui asks Marc to attend a ground mission to repair a Shielded Tower in a deserted amusement park. On their way to the mission, the Awakeners record video notes in case they sacrifice in the mission. On Lighthouse, Charles is weak due to his Scarlet Pheromone infection and is kept alive through regularly subtracting the substances from his body. On the ground, the Awakeners fix the tower’s plasma emitter and clear the Mana buds at the site. Marc tells Bai Yuekui about the memories he saw during his last test, noting the woman in the memory looks like her but with black hair. He questions whether their first encounter was planned by Bai while he was still a Hunter. Bai Yuekui explains that LongGu Village isn’t the only surviving community on the ground. When Lighthouse enters this continent, all the communities are monitoring. As night falls, a group of Sharp Eels breaks into the site.
19	3	"The Blazing Spear"	May 30, 2025
The Awakeners rush to repair the Shielded Tower. A large bird-like Extremozoan, Coverage, approaches the tower. Bai Yuekui begins restarting the tower. However, Maiduo exits the Guiyuan mode while trying to save Cha Gai from Coverage and is exposed to the Extremozoans. The team battles the Extremozoans, using their own unique powers and collaborating tightly. During the fight, Marc is bitten by Coverage, and his blood spills onto a seemingly dead Mana bud. The Bud absorbs his blood. Maiduo and Marc block the entrance where the Extremonzoans are coming. Shan Da and Xu Tong release the Life Substance bait, but Coverage breaks it and does not fall for it. As it breaks the bait, Xia Dou and Maiduo’s Life Substance are interrupted. Fang Yuan is severely injured and dies in the mission. On the ground, Sui Ying leads the team toward Marc, guided by Jian Jian. The team falls into a trap set by Extremonzoan Spawnbearers. During the fight, Mo Cheng, Kun Jie, Fei Xue, and Erika enter Sui Ying’s vehicle and question him about whether he is related to Marc’s assassination. Not to affect the combat, Kun Jie replies to Rita’s report and guides her on how to make the Extremozoans repel, ordering the team to retreat. Just as Kun Jie is about to shoot Sui Ying, believing that he’s the one who killed Marc, 8925 rushes out and pulls the chocker bomb trigger.
20	4	"Awakening of the Wanderer"	June 6, 2025
Bai Yuekui regenerates the Life Substance bait and defeats Coverage, but she suffers from the backlash of overusing her power. The Bud that had absorbed Marc’s blood disappears. At the entrance, Maiduo is stabbed by a Sharp Eel. She asks Marc to subtract her Life Substance to bring her home. Marc follows her will. The Shielded Tower restarts, forcing the Sharp Eels to retreat. On the other side, Kun Jie is injured from the explosion. Sui Ying removes the chokers from Fei Xue, Erika, and Mo Cheng, asking them to help the team retreat from the Spawnbearers.
21	5	"Voyage Beyond the Rainbow"	June 13, 2025
LongGu Village holds a farewell ceremony for Fang Yuan and Maiduo. They store Fang Yuan’s Life Substance and play the video message left by the two. The entire village sings along to Maiduo’s message. As the leader of the children in LongGu Village, Maiduo appoints Marc to be her successor. Wulan Haisang confronts Marc, blaming him for Maiduo’s death. But Wulan Aodeng stops him and says that LongGu Village has the technique to subtract Life Substance from Mana using the Oscillator. Though the technique is not perfected, Marc agrees to participate. In a hidden corner, the Bud that absorbed Marc’s blood witnesses what happens in the village. Bai Yuekui puts Marc into Gulu’s arcade room to strengthen his neuronal connections, thus getting familiar with controlling his Extremozoan body. To qualify for the experiment, Marc must pass all the games. Dulu and Bai also note that Shan Shihui is the village’s weakest player, stimulating Marc to practice. After endless day-and-night practice, Marc sees little improvement. Bai Yuekui advises him that treating the games as mere games will not help. True practice comes form integrating effort into daily life. By changing his mindset, Marc finally gains the level of control over his body as Bai required.
22	6	"Convergence of Souls"	June 20, 2025
Xia Tianlai conducts the Life Substance subtraction experiment on Marc. Entering his body through consciousness, Marc uses a sphenoid bone-like controller to navigate his core and locate Maiduo’s Life Substance. In the core, Marc appears as his younger self, breaking from an experimental jar. He enters his core world, similar to the real-world ruins. Just as an Extremozoan is about to swallow him, teenage Ran Bing appears and saves him. The two go on the journey to find Maiduo. In the deepest part of Marc’s core is a decayed remnant of a giant pregnant woman, who tells him they share the same origin and that he has been blinded by lies. To get what he lost, he should return her. As she speaks to Marc, Clotho on Lighthouse starts to act autonomously, shutting down Lighthouse’s central system and causing Lighthouse to fall. Under Jing Nan’s guidance, the Control Room staffs and laborers together initiate the emergency stop procedure. In a deep cave within his core, Marc finds Maiduo’s Life Substance and releases her. The overexposure of his core to the Oscillator causes Marc to faint. In the real world, the villagers use acupuncture to save him. In his mind, Ran Bing performs PCR to revive little Marc. Just as Lighthouse is about to crash, the emergency stop activates. But the joy of surviving from crisis on Lighthouse attracts large crowds of Extremozoans. Little Marc tells Ran Bing everything he experienced after her death. Ran Bing gives Marc the final farewell, knowing that she’ll gradually weaken while remaining inside Marc’s core.
23	7	"The First Unraveling"	June 27, 2025
Bai Yuekui discovers that the Mind Control Room, where Marc navigates his consciousness, could allow him to enter the Mana core without delivering Life Substance to the ecosystem. However, her discussion with the village elders reveal that Lu Sheng — whose memory Marc saw — once attempted this method but was seduced by Mana. Bai Yuekui brings the elders to the Core of the Sheilded Tower. On Lighthouse, Jing Nan discusses how to deal with the system shutdown caused by Clotho with Charles. She proposes connecting human brain to Clotho for communication. Facing the approaching Extremozoans, Carrie suggests using healthy human bodies to speed up the Linyuan Armor experiment. Facing the crisis, Charles decides to permit the weapon Defense Force requires and Carrie’s experiment requests. He lets Jing Nan visit Morgen to find more information about Clotho. In the Shielded Tower Core lies the real remnant of Mana Origin, whose magnetic field is used to keep the Extremozoans away. Lu Sheng was born from Mana Origin’s Left Brain and saved by Bai Yuekui from biological experiments, but inevitably returned to Mana. The conversation between Bai and the elders confirms that Marc is one of Lu Sheng’s replicas. Bai Yuetian, Bai Yuekui’s brother, with his mind uploaded to the cloud, monitors Mana Origin’s activity in the Core. He warns that Marc is already connect to Mana Origin and urges Bai yuekui to avoid repeating what happened to Lu Sheng. Bai Yuekui promises to kill Marc if necessary. Bai Yuetian surrenders and gives them a monitor to detect Marc’s connection stage with Mana Origin. Morgen now live in a secret room left by Mei Wei, Morgen’s wife. His mind is restracted to decades earlier. Victor gives Jing Nan the notes on Clotho Morgen left for her. In the past, Clotho intruded on Lighthouse’s central system and saved the people. However, when Jing Nan suggests connecting human brain to Clotho, Morgen rejects her words. On the ground, the Hunters approach a LongGu experimental site and are stopped by Sui Xing. Sui Ying expresses their intention to find Marc. Under Lighthouse, the Extremozoans begin climbing on one another and form a mountain approaching the bottom of Lighthouse.
24	8	"Storm Approaching"	July 4, 2025
4079 visits 4277, who is now pregnant and hiding in a secret room on Lighthouse. Using his authority as Hunter commander, Sui Ying provided 4277 with a repair room. He also brought superior food for 4079 and 4277 and relocated 4079 to a safer laborer section. Just as the two asked him how he became a superior, Sui Ying got angry as he remembered his dirty deal with Charles. At LongGu experimental site, the Awakeners clash with the Hunters at night. By splitting into two teams, the Hunters manage to break into the site. Marc learns that Xia Tianlai once attempted to revive his wife by putting her Life Substance back into her body. She turned into a human-flesh-dust hybrid, unable to control herself. Marc tells Bai Yuekui that the voice in his mind says she can revive Ran Bing. Bai tells him not to believe the words. Receiving updates on the Hunters’ attack, Bai and Marc head to the site. Meanwhile, on Lighthouse, Carrie continues her experiment on Linyuan Armor. Using a healthy laborer, the Armor can operate briefly, but it is not controllable and eventually halts after depleting the laborer’s energy.
25	9	"Shadow, Ashes, and Remnants"	July 11, 2025
The Hunters fight with the Awakeners, both having casualties. The way Awakeners utilize their Life-Substance-based powers confuses the Hunters. However, with the numerical advantage, the Hunters reach the center of the site. There, Kholova and the rest of the team take down many Hunters. However, as Mo Cheng and the supply team reach the site, the Awakeners are taken hostage. Sui Xing tells the fact that she once saw Mo Cheng during the ground operation. Together with Kholova, Sui Xing reveals the truth behind Marc’s assassination in a vivid tone, stirring suspicion among the Hunters toward Sui Ying. Without anyone’s notice, Kholova enters a control cube and initiates a human-shaped battle armor similar to Linyuan. She drags Sui Ying into the fight room and beats him. Her position is being detected by the Hunters, but Erika and Fei Xue control the Hunters. The grenades thrown out by Carol hurt Kholova, making her unable to control the armor, which emits Mana substance and starts to act on its own. Just at the moment, Bai Yuekui and Marc arrive, bringing the rest of the team to take hostage of the Hunters. Bai Yuekui sends Marc to confront the armor. With his new skill using his Mind Control Room, Marc defeats the armor. From Qian Li’s words, the Hunters realize that the Extremozoan-shaped creature is Marc, and they had been opposing those who had saved Marc. Marc reunites with his old teammates. Feeling ignored by Marc, Sui Ying admits his role in Marc’s assassination. Marc tells Sui Ying that if he had told him Charles’s plan, maybe things would have been different.
26	10	"For Whom We Fight"	July 18, 2025
The Hunters are escorted back to LongGu Village. During the journey, Sui Ying recalls his past with 4277 on Lighthouse. Bai Yuekui decides to admit the Hunters into the village. Beneath Lighthouse, the Extremozoans are about to reach the bottom. The Defense Force is having their last meal before the battle. Jing Nan visits Doctor Flin to consult about connecting human brain to Clotho. Flin warns that Jing Nan will need to be injected with Mana Substance to establish the connection. Senger’s battle strategy only momentarily halts the Extremozoans. The Extremozoan mountain is supported by a giant Double Calyx. Through Holland’s suicide attack, the Defense Force destroys a part of the mountain. Charles denies Senger’s request to activate the central laser. Meanwhile, a group of Extremozoans manages to get onto the bottom of Lighthouse. Skipping Senger’s order, Siltar gives the order to retreat. She is immediately executed by Light and Shadow Society supervisor for violating regulations. Senger decides to dismantle the lowest section of Lighthouse and withdraw to the upper levels.
27	11	"Fearlessness"	July 25, 2025
The Awakeners and Hunters arrive at LongGu Village. When Jianjian scans the human-shaped weapon armor, it identifies it as patient Marc, but is quickly turned down by Bai Yuekui. The villagers inform Bai Yuekui that on the west side of the village, a massive crowd of Extremozoans is gathering. The story flashes back to decades ago: little Charles is awakened by the howling wind and walks down the corridor. In the meeting room, Morgen is holding a meeting with the key managers on Lighthouse. He declares that Lighthouse will initiate gene separation to allocate limited resources. Family relationships will be abolished, and only individuals with matching qualified genes can reproduce under allocation. Morgen also declares the Three Core Doctrines: gene optimization, collective education, and elder expedition. To ease potential fear in the public, Morgen decides to change the Department of Justice into the Light and Shadow Society, as some public have believed Charles’s experience of being saved by the Lord of Light and Shadow. Hong Lu suggests that maybe there are other ways to face the Extremozoans, as they once ignored a Hunter who had frontal lobe damage. However, Morgen decides to hide the truth and enforce the implementation of the Three Core Doctrines. To ensure the procedure, under Morgen’s order, Elon guides the Hunters in executing all the managers who object to the Doctrines. Hundreds are killed, and the massacre is covered up as a sudden monster attack. Charles becomes the bishop of Light and Shadow Society. Back to the present, Senger breaks into Light and Shadow Society and questions why Charles refuses his request. Senger brings the Linyuan Armor, using Morgen’s life to threaten Charles to step into it. Somehow, Charles survives and controls Linyuan.
28	12	"Game of Fate"	August 1, 2025
LongGu Village notices that Lighthouse is hunted by Extremozoans all over the continent. Bai Yuekui sends Bai Yuetian back to the Shielded Tower Core. On the way, she proposes that Clotho is behind the abnormal summoning of Extremozoans. At night, Sui Ying tells Marc that Jianjian guides them to the experimental site and recognizes the weapon armor as Marc. Marc recalls an earlier conversation with Fei Xue, who tells him that Kun Jie once found a storage room full of human replicas that look the same as Marc. Marc enters Bai Yuekui’s chamber and is followed by the Mana Bud. Inside, he sees failed versions of himself combined with Mana in jars, alongside stored Spinal centipedes. Marc reads through the documents on Mana Origin, Lu Sheng, and Bai’s past experiments. He gets to know that the Spinal Centipede parasitizing him was intentionally released by Bai Yuekui, as he’s the only replica version that has Life Substance. Mana Origin communicates with Marc via the Bud, continuing to lure him. The Bud enters Marc’s body and entwines his core. Feeling betrayed, Marc leaves the village. Bai Yuekui captures Marc and brings him to outer space in order to cut Mana’s connection to him. But she fails. The two fight against each other. In the end, Marc cuts down Bai Yuekui’s left hand, but Bai Yuekui cuts Marc into pieces. At Marc’s dying moment, Bai Yuekui reveals that the catastrophe on Earth is due to humanity’s rapid biomedical technology development towards eternal life and is suppressed by the higher dimensions. She questions why humankind is like a chess piece, manipulated by someone over a chessboard. The Bud inside Marc activates, transforming Marc’s double-stranded DNA into triple-stranded form, which is exactly Bai’s plan. She allowed Marc’s entrance into her chamber from her terminal. Severely injured, Bai Yuekui drifts into space. Marc returns to the Earth.

== Production ==
Ling Cage was developed initially by a 150-person team. Pre-production — including scriptwriting, art design, storyboarding, and asset development — lasted a year and a half, with official production beginning in November 2018. The story focuses on "humanity" as the core to the story, delivering hope in desperation. The team chose 3D production for its ability to handle long action sequence with complex camera movement. The central creative concept of Ling Cage is: courage nourishes hope.The project contains the ideal of community of common destiny, eastern philosophy, and apocalyptic ethics. It draws inspiration from Chinese culture including meridian, traditional martial arts, and Taoism. The setting of "Life Substance" in the animation as the combination of information, energy, and data. To ensure technical accuracy, the production team 3D-printed models of items such as heavy-duty mecha and vehicles to support animation workflow.

The animation technique of Ling Cage elevated in Season 2 and the team experimented various storytelling techniques such adding more music-action sequence to the show and playing with different editing styles. The show is selected as “2024–2025 NRTA ‘Outstanding Online Audiovisual Works Creation & Promotion Project.’”

For Season 3, the production team visited science labs such as Huairou Science City, Institute of Vertebrate Paleontology and Paleoanthropology to invite scientific consultant for topics such as Brain-Computer Interface and further solidifying the setting of Extremozoans and Mana Ecosystem.

== Broadcast ==
=== Release ===
February 8, 2018, YHKT released the first 17-minute PV for Ling Cage. On March 28, 2025, new PV was released, confirming Ling Cage would be released March 15, 2019.

On November 4, 2023, 30-minute preview PV for Ling Cage Season 2 was released, telling the story about how Bai Yuekui finds Lu Sheng, AI intelligence Ash, Mana origin, and origin of Clotho.

On March 27, 2025, Ling Cage announced Season 2 would be released on May 23, 2025 on a weekly basis. To help the audience to recap on Season 1, a 5-episode refined version was released.

Ling Cage doesn't have official overseas distribution. Creative coordinator Ruan Rui mentioned in one interview that the overseas platform require Japanese dubbed version if not for English version.

=== Manga Book ===
Starting from May 28, 2021, YHKT releases manga Ling Cage· Story about Yuekui, which follows the story of Bai Yuekui in the old world when the geological catastrophe first broke out. The manga adds in more settings about Ling Cage world view.

=== Soundtrack ===
Ling Cage Season 1 Original Soundtrack
No.	Title	Writer(s)	Artist(s)	Length
1.	"INCARNATION"	Music: Yang Bingyin 杨秉音; Lyrics: Wang Xiaoqian 王晓倩	Zhang Liangying 张靓颖
2.	"重生" (Reborn)	Music: Yang Bingyin 杨秉音; Lyrics: Lin Qiao 林乔, Wang Xiaoqian 王晓倩	Liu Mu 刘牧
3.	"我们活着" (We're Alive)	Music: Yang Bingyin 杨秉音; Lyrics: Ruan Rui 阮瑞	Liu Mu 刘牧
4.	"雪人" (Snowman)	Music: Yang Bingyin 杨秉音; Lyrics: Wang Xiaoqian 王晓倩	Zhou Ziqi 周梓琦
5.	"握空" (Holds Nothing)	Music: Yang Bingyin 杨秉音; Lyrics: Lin Qiao 林乔, Liu Enxun 刘恩汛	Xu Bingchao 徐炳超
6.	"洁白的悲伤" (White Sadness)	Music: Yang Bingyin 杨秉音; Lyrics: Wang Xiaoqian 王晓倩	Liu Mu 刘牧
7.	"抉择" (Choice)	Yang Bingyin 杨秉音
8.	"沉睡的未来" (Future in Sleep)	Yang Bingyin 杨秉音
9.	"冰冻的烈日" (Frozen Sun)	Yang Bingyin 杨秉音
10.	"罪子" (Sinner)	Yang Bingyin 杨秉音
11.	"禁锢之地" (The Trapped)	Yang Bingyin 杨秉音
12.	"洞中人" (People in Cave)	Yang Bingyin 杨秉音
13.	"荒芜之上" (Beyond the Wasteland)	Yang Bingyin 杨秉音
14.	"佩妮的日记" (Penny's Diary)	Yang Bingyin 杨秉音
15.	"猎荒归来" (Returning from the Hunt)	Yang Bingyin 杨秉音
16.	"夜曲2X18" (Nocturne 2X18)	Yang Bingyin 杨秉音
17.	"红炎" (Red Flame)	Yang Bingyin 杨秉音
18.	"远山" (Distant Mountain)	Yang Bingyin 杨秉音
19.	"激斗回想" (Battle Recall)	Yang Bingyin 杨秉音
20.	"玛娜的叙事诗其一·摩耶" (Mana's Epic Poem I·Maya)	Yang Bingyin 杨秉音
21.	"晨钟" (Morning Bell)	Yang Bingyin 杨秉音

Ling Cage Season 1 ENDING Original Soundtrack
No.	Title	Writer(s)	Artist(s)	Length
1.	"祂的谎言" (Its Lie)	Music: Yang Bingyin 杨秉音; Lyrics: Liu Jun 刘骏, Yang Bingyin 杨秉音	Zhang Guwei 张顾卫
2.	"没有答案的人" (Man with No Answer)	Music: Yang Bingyin 杨秉音; Lyrics: Lin Qiao 林乔, Wang Xiaoqian 王晓倩	Yang Bingyin 杨秉音
3.	"克罗托的选择" (Clotho's Choice)	Yang Bingyin 杨秉音
4.	"审判" (Trial)	Yang Bingyin 杨秉音
5.	"天引" (Fortale)	Yang Bingyin 杨秉音
6.	"英雄之旅" (Hero's Journey)	Yang Bingyin 杨秉音
7.	"逾越善恶" (Cross Good and Evil)	Yang Bingyin 杨秉音
8.	"大黑天" (Dark Day)	Yang Bingyin 杨秉音
9.	"寻迦南" (Find Canaan)	Yang Bingyin 杨秉音
10.	"命运之轮(8bit版)" (Wheel of Fate (8bit Ver.))	Yang Bingyin 杨秉音
11.	"祂的谎言(伴奏)" (Its Lie (Instr.))	Yang Bingyin 杨秉音
12.	"没有答案的人(伴奏)" (Man with No Answer (Instr.))	Yang Bingyin 杨秉音

Ling Cage Season 2 Original Soundtrack
No.	Title	Writer(s)	Artist(s)	Length
1.	"末日留守者" (Watcher in Apocalypse)	Music: Yang Bingyin 杨秉音; Lyrics: Zhang Jiayu 张家钰, YHKT	Kenji Wu 吴克群
2.	"倒放的一生" (Life Playing Backward)	Music: Li Sihan 李思瀚; Lyrics: Wu Xiatian 武夏添, YHKT	Ella Chen 陈嘉桦，Wu Yaotao 吴垚滔
3.	"颂赞" (Praise)	Music: Yang Bingyin 杨秉音; Lyrics: Wang Chenwei 汪晨微, YHKT	Wu Mochou 吴莫愁
4.	"第一推动力" (First Driving Force)	Music: VNTA, Tobi Weiss; Lyrics: Zhang Jiayu 张家钰, YHKT	Wang Xiaokun 王啸坤
5.	"道" (The Way)	Music: Yang Bingyin 杨秉音; Lyrics: Zhang Jiayu 张家钰, YHKT	Yang Bingyin 杨秉音
6.	"挣脱" (Break Free)	Music: Yang Bingyin 杨秉音; Lyrics: Zhang Jiayu 张家钰, YHKT	Zhou Ziqi 周梓琦
7.	"长夜尽头" (End of Long Night)	Music: Yang Bingyin 杨秉音; Lyrics: Zhang Jiayu 张家钰, YHKT	Liu Mu 刘牧
8.	"红梅花的菜" (Red Plum Blossom's Type)	Music: Yang Bingyin 杨秉音; Lyrics: Chen Long 陈龙, YHKT	克隆人CLON
9.	"彩虹远航 (单人清唱版)" (Voyage of Rainbow (Solo Ver.))	Music: Yang Bingyin 杨秉音; Lyrics: Wu Xiatian 武夏添, YHKT	Xu Jiaqi 徐佳琦,
10.	"彩虹远航 (阿卡贝拉版)" (Voyage of Rainbow (Acapella Ver.))	Music: Yang Bingyin 杨秉音; Lyrics: Wu Xiatian 武夏添, YHKT	Xu Jiaqi 徐佳琦, 合不拢嘴音乐 Why not Studio
11.	"未知域" (Unknown Domain)	Yang Bingyin 杨秉音
12.	"烟火气" (Liveliness)	Yang Bingyin 杨秉音
13.	"正义班长的爱" (Love from the Justice Class Leader)	Yang Bingyin 杨秉音
14.	"跑六枪" (The Running Spear)	Yang Bingyin 杨秉音
15.	"孩子的仇恨" (Child's Hate)	Yang Bingyin 杨秉音
16.	"诘问" (Interrogation)	Yang Bingyin 杨秉音
17.	"独一无二的存在" (Unique Existence)	Yang Bingyin 杨秉音
18.	"负子兽的围剿" (Spawnbearer's Hunt)	Yang Bingyin 杨秉音
19.	"希望予你" (Giving You the Hope)	Yang Bingyin 杨秉音
20.	"重力体出击" (Heavy-Mecha Attack)	Yang Bingyin 杨秉音
21.	"谁更值得被珍惜" (Who Deserves to Be Cherished More)	Arther Brouns
22.	"小庵赢了" (Xiaoan Won)	Yang Bingyin 杨秉音
23.	"在游戏厅输了陆佰肆拾叁次的时候你在想什么" (What Were You Thinking When You Lost 643 Times at the Arcade Room)	Yang Bingyin 杨秉音
24.	"回到从前" (Back to the Past)	Yang Bingyin 杨秉音
25.	"进入灵息籽" (Into the Core)	Yang Bingyin 杨秉音
26.	"克罗托的阴谋" (Clotho's Conspiracy)	Yang Bingyin 杨秉音
27.	"边境之外" (Beyond Borders)	Yang Bingyin 杨秉音
28.	"无法言说的真相" (Truth Can Not Be Told)	Yang Bingyin 杨秉音
29.	"平原之战" (Battle of the Plains)	Yang Bingyin 杨秉音
30.	"力量的祭品" (Offering of Power)	Yang Bingyin 杨秉音
31.	"解禁" (Lifting the Ban)	Yang Bingyin 杨秉音
32.	"年轻的新王" (Young New King)	Yang Bingyin 杨秉音
33.	"美人鱼的尾鳍" (Mermaid's Tail)	Yang Bingyin 杨秉音
34.	"信仰的回馈" (Feedback of Faith)	Yang Bingyin 杨秉音
35.	"祂的谎言(揭秘版)" (Its Lie)	Music: Yang Bingyin 杨秉音; Lyrics: Liu Jun 刘骏, Yang Bingyin 杨秉音	Zhang Guwei 张顾卫
36.	"零度逃亡" (Zero Escape)	Yang Bingyin 杨秉音
37.	"致命红光" (Lethal Red Light)	Yang Bingyin 杨秉音
38.	"绝地反杀" (Comeback Win)	Yang Bingyin 杨秉音
39.	"蚁民街" (Ant Street)	Yang Bingyin 杨秉音
40.	"末日留守者(伴奏)" (Watcher in Apocalypse (Instr.))	Yang Bingyin 杨秉音
41.	"倒放的一生(伴奏)" (Life Playing Backward (Instr.))	Yang Bingyin 杨秉音
42.	"赞颂(伴奏)" (Praise (Instr.))	Yang Bingyin 杨秉音
43.	"第一推动力(伴奏)" (First Driving Force (Instr.))	Yang Bingyin 杨秉音
44.	"道(伴奏)" (The Way (Instr.))	Yang Bingyin 杨秉音
45.	"长夜尽头(伴奏)" (End of Long Night (Instr.))	Yang Bingyin 杨秉音
46.	"红梅花的菜(伴奏)" (Red Plum Blossom's Type (Instr.))	Yang Bingyin 杨秉音

== Reception ==
Ling Cage's first episode received 660,000 views and 18,000 reviews in the first day, setting a record on Bilibili. Within the first ten minutes of the premiere, the series drew 1.6 million views and 1.5 million subscriptions. As the first season wrapped, Ling Cage received over 400 million views with 9.6/10 rating on Bilibili, 8.3/10 on Douban, and 8.2/10 rating on IMDb.

Due to the long release intervals between episodes, viewers began posting the phrase “Guk, I’m here” in bullet comments whenever a new episode dropped. The phrase mirrors the Light and Shadow Society’s line “For this reason, I stay” in Mandarin, while also referencing Bilibili slang that calls creators with irregular updates “pigeons.”

Season 2 wrapped with 320 million views with over 11.19 million subscriptions. It received 8.9/10 rating on Douban, 9.8/10 rating on Bilibili, and 9.4/10 on IMDb. On Bilibili, more than 170,000 creators produced content related to the series, helping establish an active Ling Cage fan community. During the release of Episode 12 “Game of Fate” 390,000 viewers watched the episode simultaneously on Bilibili.

=== Accolades ===
Awards	Date	Category	Nominee(s)	Result	Ref
2025 China Radio & Television Premium Audiovisual Night	November 14, 2026	Annual Recommended Animation	Ling Cage 2	Won	
12th Cyber Sousa	November 15, 2019	Best Animation Series Golden Prize	Ling Cage: INCARNATION	Won	
16th CACC Golden Dragon Awards	September 6, 2019	Best Animation Series	Ling Cage: INCARNATION	Won	
11th Cyber Sousa	November 15, 2018	Creative Animation Short	Ling Cage: INCARNATION	Won	
