= Raúl García (animator) =

Spanish animator

García in 2026

Raúl García is a Spanish animator. He directed Extraordinary Tales and The Violinist. His 2012 film The Fall of the House of Usher was one of the last films to feature Christopher Lee. García previously worked at Hanna-Barbera and was credited for his work on Disney's Aladdin, The Lion King, and Pocahontas.
