= The Temp =

The Temp may refer to:

- The Temp (film), a 1993 thriller film starring Timothy Hutton and Lara Flynn Boyle
- "The Temp", a 1999 Fairly OddParents short
- A nickname for the character Ryan Howard from the US television series The Office
- A nickname for the Canadian TV personality Rick Campanelli
- "The Temp" (Futurama), an episode of the eighth production season of Futurama
