= Blaise (film) =

- Directed by: Jean-Paul Guigue; Dimitri Planchon
- Written by: Dimitri Planchon; Clémence Lebatteux
- Starring: Léa Drucker; Jacques Gamblin; Timéo; Nina Blanc-Francard
- Production company: KG Production
- Release date: May 14, 2026 (Cannes)
- Running time: 83 minutes
- Country: France
- Language: French

Blaise is a French animated film directed by Jean-Paul Guigue and Dimitri Planchon. The film premiered in the ACID sidebar of the 2026 Cannes Film Festival. It won for best animation at the 2026 Fantasia International Film Festival.
