= Spacetime Chronicles =

2025 Italian animated film

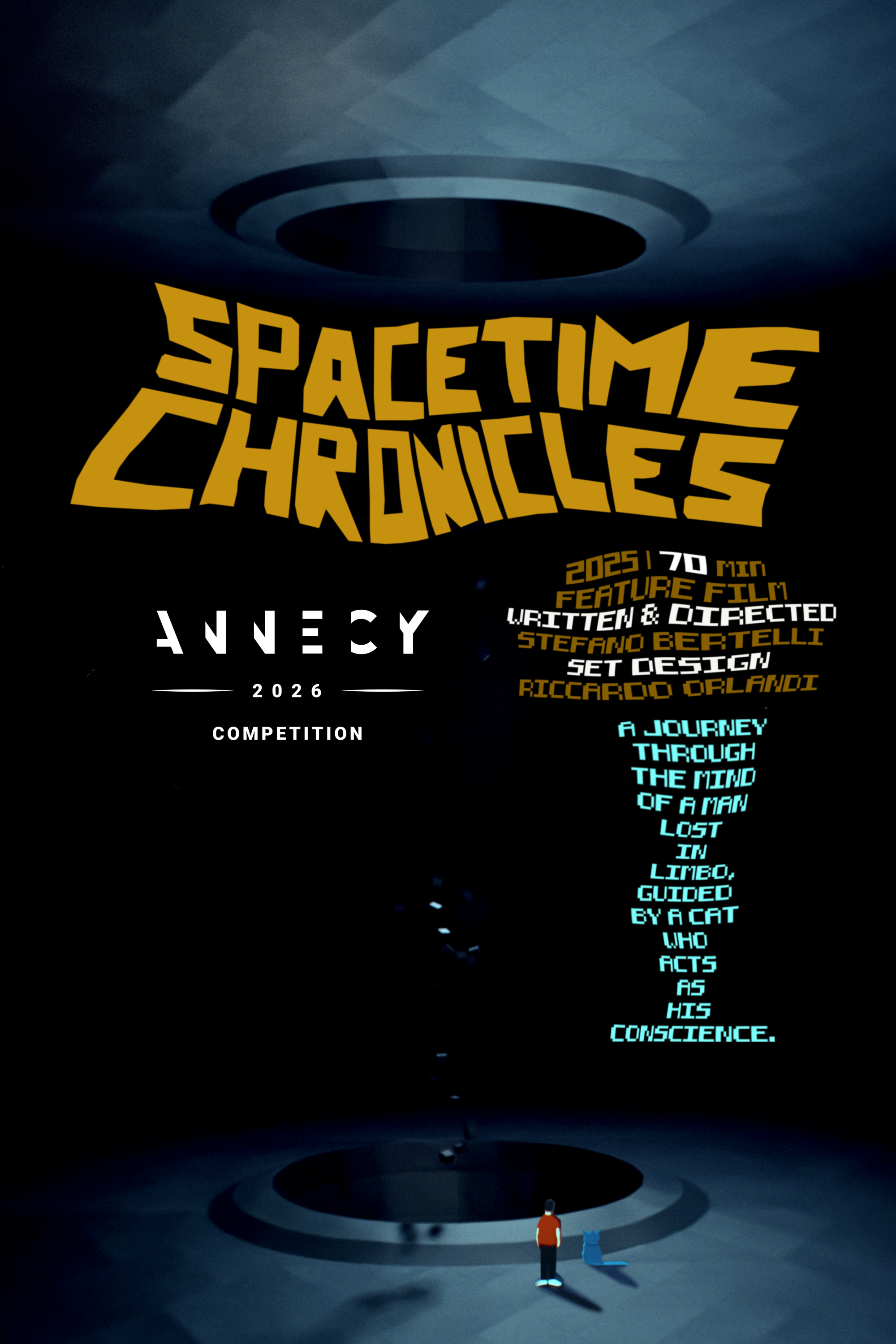
- Film poster
- Directed by: Stefano Bertelli
- Produced by: Stefano Bertelli; Riccardo Orlandi
- Production company: Seenfilm
- Distributed by: Urban Sales
- Release date: 2025
- Running time: 70 minutes
- Country: Italy
- Language: Italian

Spacetime Chronicles is a 2025 Italian animated film directed by Stefano Bertelli. The film was selected for the Contrechamp competition section at the Annecy International Animation Film Festival in 2026.

== Plot ==
The film follows Fred, a man suspended between dreams and memories, guided by a cat representing his conscience.

== Production ==
The film was produced using a handmade paper animation technique combining stop motion and slow-motion photography.

== Release ==
The film was selected for international film festivals including Annecy, Fantasia, Anima Brussels, BAFICI and Sitges in 2026. In 2026, the French sales company Urban Sales acquired international sales rights for the film.
