= Siamés =

Argentine electropop rock band

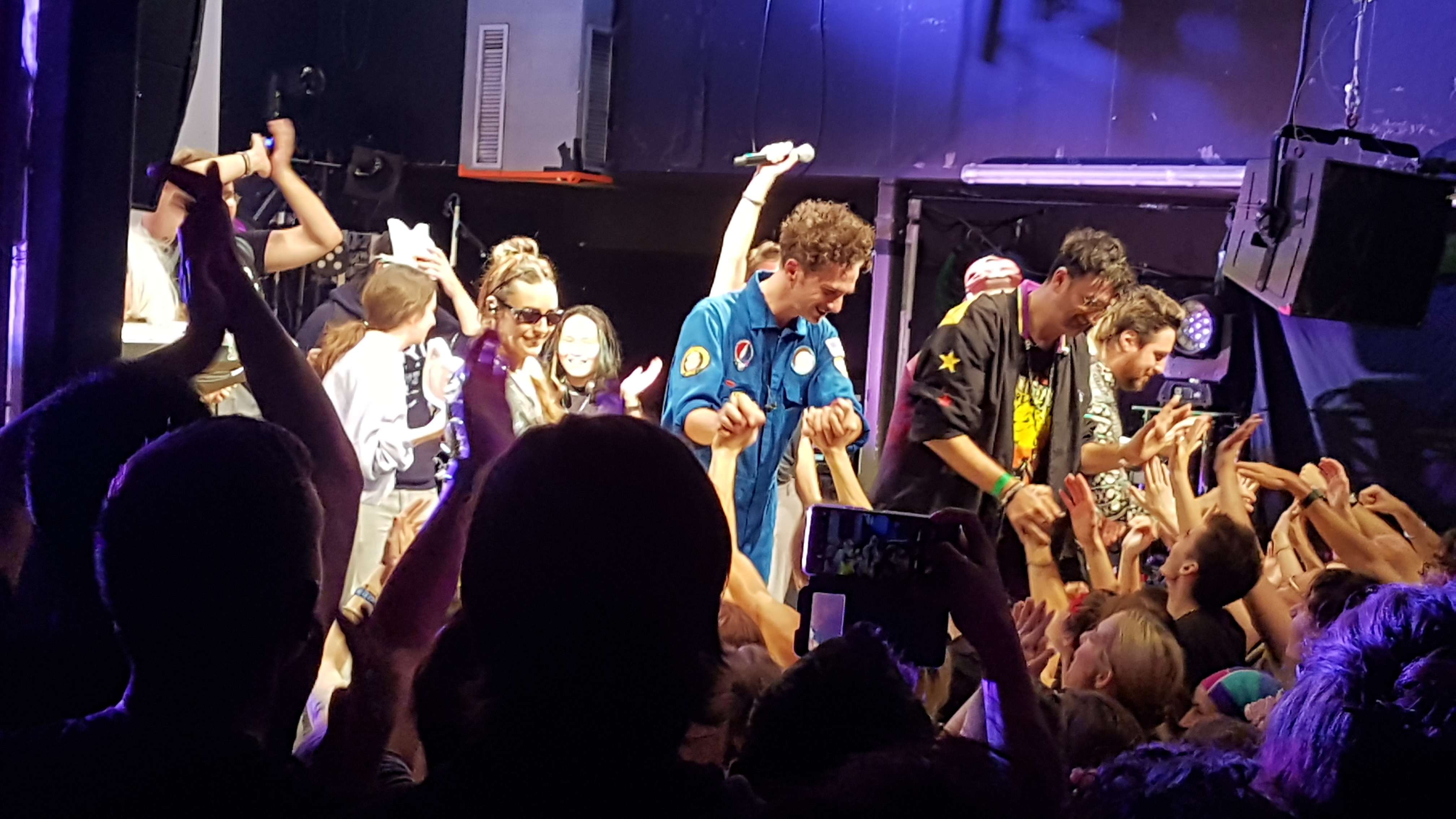
- Siamés, at their 2023 concert in Paris

Background information
- Origin: Buenos Aires, Argentina
- Genres: Electropop, rock
- Years active: 2013–present
- Members: See Band members

Siamés (stylized in all caps or as SIAMÉƧ) is an Argentine electropop rock band established in 2013 by Guillermo "Stoltz" Stölzing as vocalist and guitarist and Juan Manuel "Blakk" Kokollo as keyboardist and synthesizer. Additional band members were included during the production of the band's first album and after, with the members including Barbie Williams (vocalist), Gonzo Rooster (guitar), Tish Planes (vocalist), Lucas "Gato" Hernández (drums), Hutter Von Fonk (bass), and Walter C. (guitar).

== History ==
=== 2013–2019: Formation and Bounce into the Music ===
Stoltz and Blakk began working on music together in 2013, after meeting at a party at the Roxy club in Buenos Aires. The duo were playing at the venue for a party event called Roxtar, with Stoltz playing as a member of his former band MoodyMan, and Blakk acting as the programmer for other bands. The duo began making songs in English, despite their Spanish-speaking background.

In 2015, the duo began taking their music more seriously, around the same time that MoodyMan disbanded. They first put together the song "As You Get High" and then quickly produced ten more songs that were eventually compiled into the band's first album, Bounce Into The Music, released in August 2016.

After playing in multiple concerts and as opening acts for bands such as The B-52's and The Magic Numbers, the two creators decided in 2015 to take a risk and develop "Argentina's first anime music video". They contracted a producer, Guillermo Porro, the Rudo Company as artists, and a director, Fernando Suniga, to make the video. The first single on the album, titled "The Wolf", was released alongside said animated music video for the song, which has amassed over 237 million views on YouTube as of April 2026. They attribute the syncopation style mashup of the song with the video and the chorus to the style of French film director Michel Gondry.

=== 2019–2023: "Summer Nights" & Home ===
In June 2019, Siamés released "Summer Nights" featuring Barbie Williams, the first single and music video to promote their upcoming album. In November, two more promotional singles were released, "No Lullaby" and "I Can't Wait", and the album was re-titled Home. Two months later, Siamés released "Easier" and "Young & Restless". On March 13, 2020, Siamés released Home. The inspiration for Home was based around the idea that people want to fight for their dreams and be allowed to love the things they're interested in, while also combating the darkness in their life and their desire for hope.

In December 2022, the band held their second United States tour, followed by a tour of Mexico in March 2023. In February 2023, prior to the anticipated Mexican tour, the band announced that Stöltz was leaving the group, without giving detailed reasons. His replacement was announced to be Argentine singer Sergio Bufi.

=== 2024–present: "The Phoenix" & Melodramatic ===
In April 2024, Siamés released "The Phoenix" featuring Sergio Bufi, the first single and lyric video to promote their new upcoming album, Melodramatic. On July 25, 2024, "Alone In The Darkness" was released alongside an animated music video for the song. The music video was created by artists at Make Visual and directed by Danny Robashkin, owner of the company.

== Band members ==
=== Current members ===
- Mr. Blakk – songwriting, production, piano (2013–present)
- Gonzo Rooster – songwriting, bass guitar, guitar (2013–present)
- Tish Planes – vocals (2016–present)
- Walter C – guitar (2016–present)
- Lucas "Gato" Hernandez – drums (2016–present)
- Hutter Von Fonk – bass (2016–present)
- Sergio "Serge" Buffi – vocals (2023–present)
- Sasha Conte – (2023–present)

=== Former members ===
- Guillermo Stöltzing – vocals, songwriting, graphic art (2013–2023)
- Barbie Williams – vocals (2019–2026)

== Discography ==
Studio albums

- Bounce Into The Music (2016)
- HOME (2020)
- MELODRAMATIC (2024)

== Tours ==
The band held their first United States tour in January and February 2020 with an additional stop in Mexico City. In December 2022, they held their second United States tour, and in March 2023 they toured Mexico. So far, they have toured to multiple countries, including Germany, Denmark, France, and the UK.

== Awards and honors ==
A music competition held in December 2016 named True Sounds and hosted by Ballantine's was won by Siamés out of 270 independent bands.
