= Le Temps (disambiguation) =

Le Temps (French for The Time) may refer to:

- Le Temps, a Swiss newspaper
- Le Temps (Paris), a former French newspaper (1861–1942)
- Le Temps (1829), a former French newspaper (1829–1842)
- Le Temps (Tunisia), a Tunisian newspaper founded in 1975
- Le Temps (Ivory Coast), a newspaper in Côte d'Ivoire
- Le Temps stratégique, a former Swiss bimonthly
- Le Temps (Montreal), a former newspaper in Montreal, Quebec, founded in 1883
