= Ephemera (film) =

- Directed by: Shan Jiang
- Written by: Shan Jiang
- Produced by: Shan Jiang; Yinx Zhou; Sol Ye
- Starring: Yvonne Shuyu Zhang; Shu-Yi
- Cinematography: Feixue Tang
- Edited by: Shan Jiang; Hazel McKibbin
- Music by: Annie Hart
- Production company: Sporadic Writing School
- Release date: June 7, 2026 (Tribeca Festival)
- Running time: 82 minutes
- Countries: United States; Singapore
- Languages: English; Mandarin; Chinese

Ephemera is a 2026 independent romantic drama film written and directed by Shan Jiang. It stars Yvonne Shuyu Zhang and Shu-Yi.

The film premiered at the Tribeca Festival on June 7, 2026.

== Premise ==
In post-pandemic Shanghai, two women — one leaving, one staying — share a single electric night wandering the city. A tender, breezy queer love story where chemistry, connection and bittersweet goodbyes feel thrillingly alive.

== Cast ==
- Yvonne Shuyu Zhang as Asher
- Shu-Yi as Tori

== Production ==
Principal photography had been completed in 2025, on a romantic drama film titled Ephemera by filmmaker Shan Jiang. It starred Yvonne Shuyu Zhang and Shu-Yi, and it is a US-Singapore co-production. In April 2026, the film was selected to screen at the Tribeca Festival.

== Release ==
Ephemera premiered at the Tribeca Festival on June 7, 2026.
