= 31st Busan International Film Festival =

2026 edition of film festival

- BIFF official poster
- Opening film: The Table: Day and Night by Kim Jong-kwan
- Location: Busan Cinema Center
- Founded: 1995
- Awards: Busan Awards: Best Film: Midday Meal by Majid Majidi; Special Jury Award: My Mother by Eddie Cahyono; Best Director: Lee Yun-chan for To Be Ordinary; Best Actor: Zhou Xun for The First Taste of Loneliness; Kashun Himeno for Satoko Always; Artistic Contribution Award: Li Danfeng for The First Taste of Loneliness; Camellia Award: Ann Hui; New Currents Award: Shashank Walia; The Asian Filmmaker of the Year: Michelle Yeoh
- Directors: Jung Han-seok
- Hosted by: Korean Film Council; Supported by: Ministry of Culture, Sports and Tourism; Metropolitan City of Busan
- Artistic director: Choi Soon-dae
- No. of films: 316
- Festival date: Opening: October 6, 2026; Closing: October 15, 2026
- Website: www.biff.kr/eng/

Busan International Film Festival
- 32nd 30th

The 31st Busan International Film Festival (Korean: 제31회 부산국제영화제) was held from October 6 to October 15, 2026, at the Busan Cinema Center in Busan. Zhang Yimou, Chinese filmmaker served as President of the seven-member Competition jury. The opening ceremony held on October 6 was hosted by Kim Min-ha, South Korean actress, where, Michelle Yeoh, Malaysian actress was honoured with The Asian Filmmaker of the Year Award, and Ann Hui received the Camellia Award to honor her lifelong contributions to elevating women in cinema.

The opening ceremony was followed by the world premiere of 2026 South Korean romantic drama anthology film The Table: Day and Night by Kim Jong-kwan.

The festival concluded with a closing ceremony, hosted by Yim Si-wan, held at the Busan Cinema Center on October 15. Majid Majidi’s Iranian drama Midday Meal won the Busan Award for best film and qualified for consideration for Oscars' best international feature. Indonesian drama film My Mother by Eddie Cahyono won Special jury prize, while Taiwan's Lee Yun Chan won best director award for coming-of-age drama film To Be Ordinary. The festival presented 316 films comprising 246 films from 59 countries, which includes 95 World Premieres, and 10 International Premieres. 69 films were screened at the Community BIFF at the festival.

== Festival overview ==
This section sums up the main things taking place during the festival:

- 'A'-list classification

The festival is classified as 'A'-list festival from 2026, joining prestigious competitive festivals such as Cannes, Berlin, Venice, Locarno and San Sebastian, under the revamped accreditation process by the International Federation of Film Producers' Associations.

- Oscars for Asian Cinema!

The winner of the Busan Award – Best Film Award of the festival's Competition section, has been included in a new eligibility pathway for the Academy Award for International Feature Film. As per The Academy of Motion Picture Arts and Sciences revised rules, films awarded the Golden Bear for Best Film, Busan Award for Best Film, Palme d’Or, World Cinema Grand Jury Prize, Platform Prize and Golden Lion are eligible for consideration in the International Feature Film category without the need for official national selection.

- Poster

This year's official poster also crafted by art director Choi Soon-dae encapsulates 30 years of shared passion between audiences and filmmakers. The core motif of the poster is a "group portrait," capturing the audience who attended last year's festival. The Art Director Choi said, "What has completed the film festival is always the presence of the audience filling the seats."

- Programme

On September 1, in a press conference full programme with guest list was announced. In this edition Isabelle Huppert, Maggie Gyllenhaal, Kore-eda Hirokazu, Fan Bingbing and Michelle Yeoh will attend the festival.

- Final report

277,027 total visitors attended the festival, including 76,984 people who were part of various events held throughout the festival. 316 films including, official Selection of 246 films from 59 countries and 69 Community BIFF films were screened.

== Jury ==
=== Competition jury ===
The festival announced seven Jury members for the Competition section on September 17, presided over by Zhang Yimou.

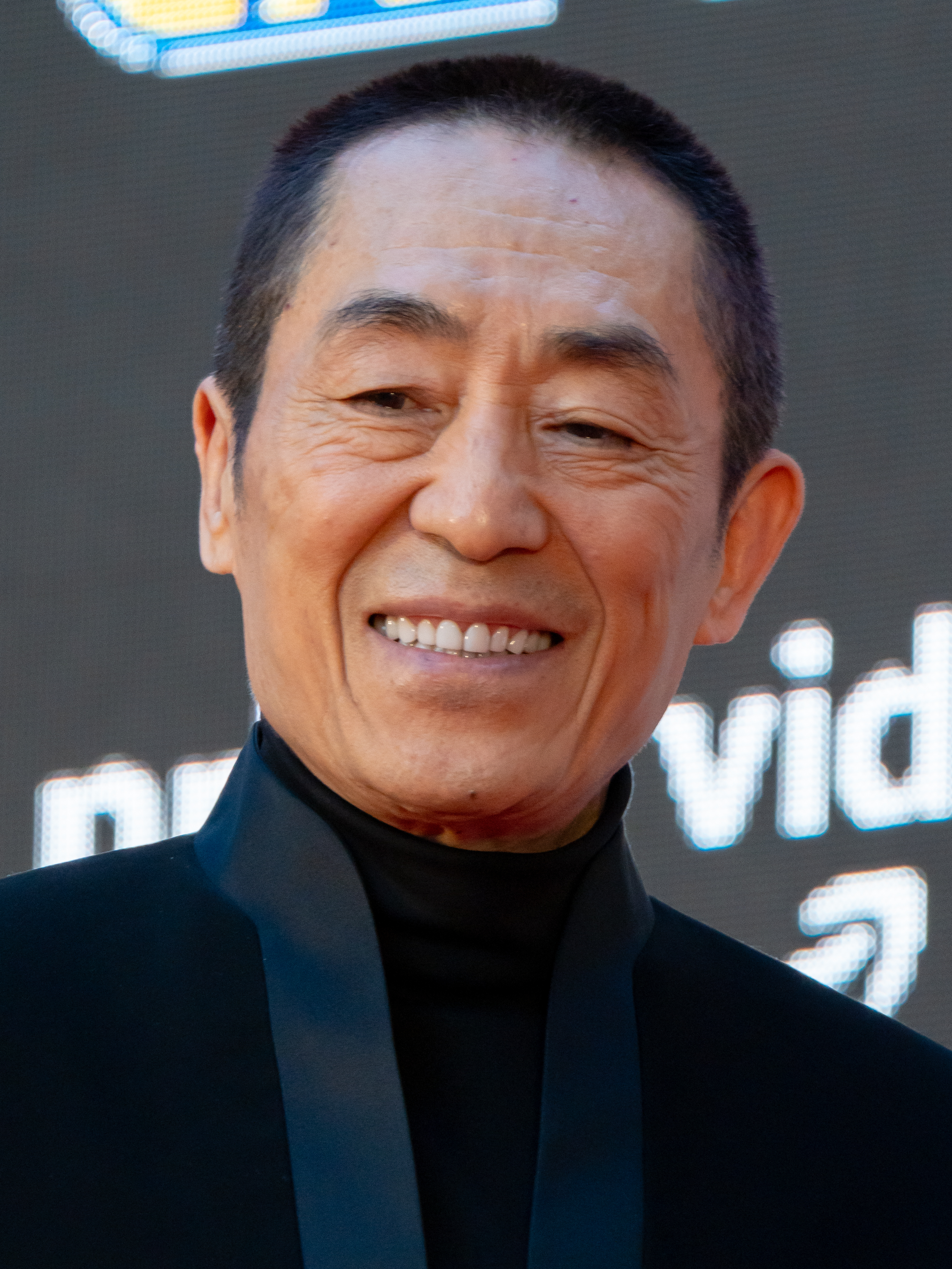
Zhang Yimou, President of the Competition jury

- Zhang Yimou, Chinese filmmaker. A leading figure of China's Fifth Generation directors, (President of jury)
- Choi Hee-seo, South Korean actress
- Bi Gan, Chinese film director, screenwriter, poet, and photographer.
- Samal Yeslyamova, Kazakhstani actor
- Kei Ishikawa, Japanese director and writer
- Jung Joo-ri, South Korean film director and screenwrite
- Tran Thi Bich Ngoc, Vietnamese producer, Project Market and Talent Project at the Da Nang Asian Film Festival

=== Major awards ===
The festival announced Jury members for the major awards on September 16, 2026.

==== Documentary Competition – BIFF Mecenat Award Jury ====
- Rintu Thomas, Academy Award nominated documentary filmmaker and director-producer from India
- Kim Taeil, director, cinematographer and editor
- Zhou Hao, former journalist

==== Korean, Asian Short Film Competition – Sonje Award Jury ====
- Anuparna Roy, Indian film director and screenwriter
- Abinash Bikram Shah, Nepalese director, writer and producer
- Lee Ran-hee, South Korean director and screenwriter

==== Vision - Asia – NETPAC Award Jury ====
- Nina Kochelyaeva, documentary filmmaker and programmer
- Matthew Poon, Senior Project Manager, HKIFF Industry
- Lee Dongha, Chairperson of the Producers Guild of Korea

==== Vision - Asia – FIPRESCI Award Jury ====
- Ma Xingxu, film critic and editor
- Teresa Vena, journalist and curator across art and film
- Roh Chul-hwan, professor of Theater and Film Studies at Inha University

=== New Currents Award Jury ===
The New Currents Award jury selects one debut film by a new director and awards a prize of ₩20 million.

- Rima Das, Indian filmmaker
- Shan Zuolong, Chinese film producer
- Shim Eun-kyung, South Korean actress

=== Actor of the Year Award ===
- Yoo Yeon-seok, South Korean actor
- Go Ah-sung, South Korean actress

=== DGK PLUS M Award ===
- Kim Mi-jo, South Korean director
- Kim Yong-wan, South Korean director
- Shin Joon, South Korean film director

=== KBS Independent Film Award ===
- Nam Daeun, South Korean critic
- Shin Yeon-shick, South Korean film director and screenwriter
- Lee Ji-won, South Korean film director

=== Critic b Award ===
- Go Min-gyu, South Korean Critic
- Kim Min-woo, South Korean Critic
- Hong Eun-mi, South Korean Critic

=== K-Movie Award ===
- Lee Won-jae, Vice President of K-MOVIE ENTERTAINMENT
- Billy Acumen, CEO of B.A. Entertainment
- Jeon Hye-jung, festival director of London East Asia Film Festival

=== NETPAC ===
- Matthew Poon, Senior Project Manager, HKIFF Industry
- Nina Kochekyaeva, Head of Department for the Development and Approbation of Film Education Methods at VGIK
- Lee Dong-ha, CEO of REDPETER FILMS, Chairperson of the Producers Guild of Korea(PGK)

=== FIPRESCI ===
- Ma Xingxu, Chinese critic
- Roh Chul-hwan, professor at Inha University.
- Teresa Vena, Swiss film critic

== Screening venues ==
- Busan Cinema Center, Centum City, Busan, South Korea
- CJ CGV, Centum City
- Lotte Cinema
- Centum City, Haeundae-gu, Busan
- KOFIC Theater
- Sohyang Theater, Woori Bank Hall
- Busan Community Media Center Open Hall
- Community BIFF: MEGABOX Busan Theater, Busan Catholic Center, Space 101.1

== Events ==
=== Actors House ===
In this edition the following actors shared unknown behind-the-scenes stories and their future plans with the audience:

- Kim Go-eun, South Korean actress
- Kim Min-ha, South Korean actress
- Shin Min-a, South Korean actress
- Ryu Seung-ryong, South Korean actor
- Lee Min-ho, South Korean actor and singer
- Ju Ji-hoon, South Korean actor and model

=== Talk-to-Talk Scene Stealers: Steal the Spotlight ===
The actors shared their work, creative process, their journey as performers, and the behind-the-scenes effort that goes into creating a single unforgettable moment on the screen:

- Kim Gook-hee
- Kim Jae-chul
- Gong Min-jeung, South Korean actress
- Park Ji-yeon
- Im Seong-jae
- Kim Jun-han

=== Master class ===
A lecture program that offers an in-depth look into the film philosophies and creative experiences of world-renowned following filmmakers:

- Na Hong-jin, South Korean director
- Lav Diaz, Filipino filmmaker, actor, and former film critic
- Bertrand Mandico, French film director and screenwriter
- Rintaro, Japanese anime director

=== Cine Class ===
Audiences met the following creators and experts up close:

- Zhang Lü, is a Korean Chinese filmmaker
- Seifollah Samadian, Iranian photographer
- Judith Godrèche, French actress, author and feminist activist
- Billy Acumen, film producer
- Bi Gan, Chinese film director, screenwriter, poet, and photographer
- Shim Eun-kyung, South Korean actress
- Charlotte Gainsbourg, Muse of French Chic: French screen icon and musician Charlotte Gainsbourg will talk about her four-decade career across cinema, fashion, and music on October 8.

=== Special Talk: In-Depth Conversations with Guests ===
A dialogue program held alongside film screenings, where following directors, and actors, discussed the significance and behind-the-scenes stories of their works:

- Kim Tae-ho, South Korean television director
- Ann Hui, Hong Kong filmmaker and actress
- Jung Sung-il, South Korean actor
- Special Talk of Charlotte Gainsbourg with Jung Eun-chae: Following the screening of 2011 science fiction drama film Melancholia by Lars von Trier on October 8, Charlotte Gainsbourg, the star of the film talked with South Korean actress Jung Eun-chae and discussed behind-the-scenes stories of Melancholia. Jung had worked with Gainsbourg's late mother, Jane Birkin, in Hong Sang-soo's 2013 film Nobody's Daughter Haewon.

== Opening and closing ceremony ==
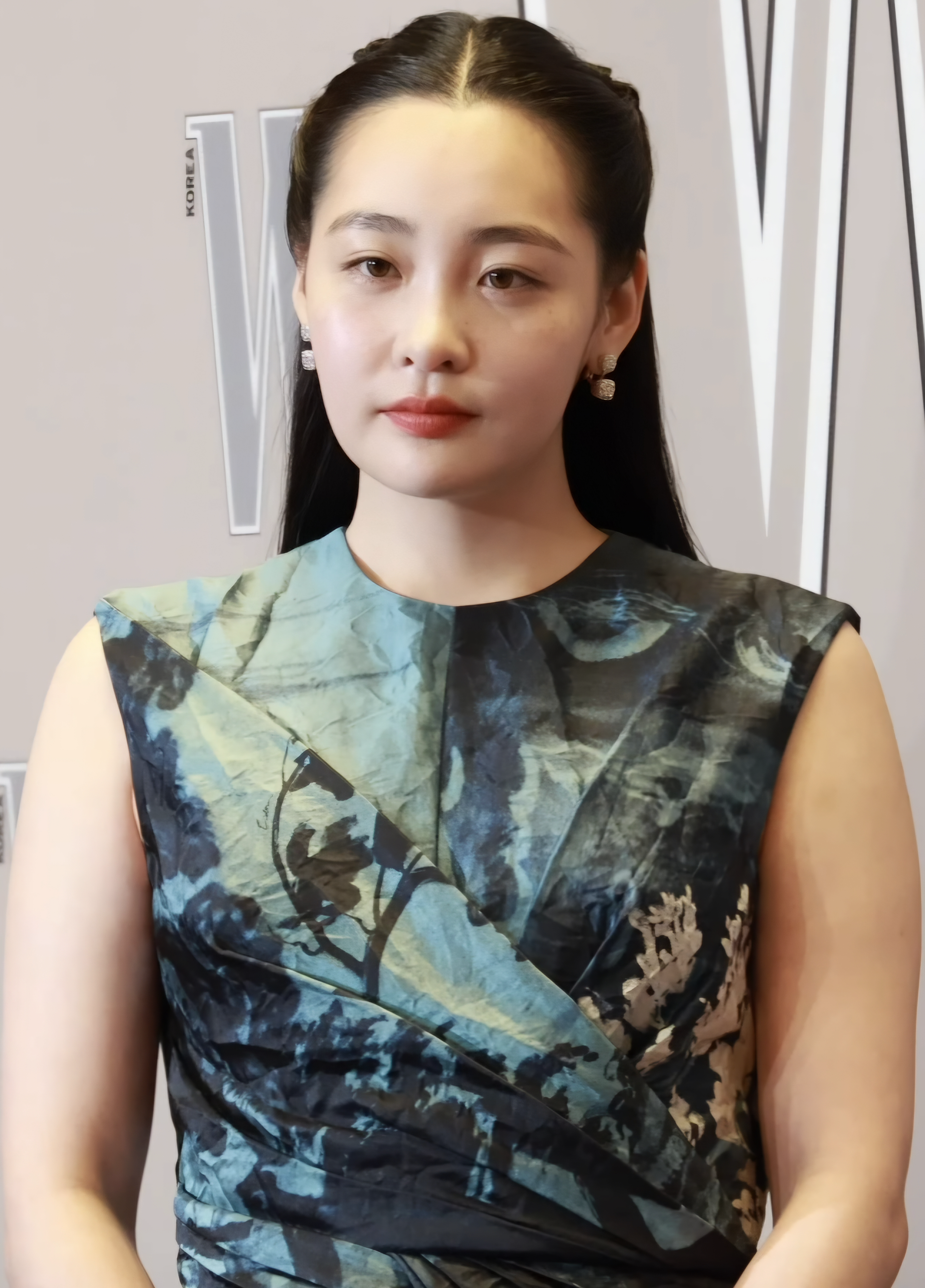
Kim Min-ha host of the opening ceremony

The opening ceremony of the festival hosted by actress Kim Min-ha was held on October 6, at the Busan Cinema Center Outdoor Theater in Haeundae. Chinese actress Fan Bingbing and Japanese directors Koji Fukada and Hirokazu Koreeda, French actor and musician Charlotte Gainsbourg, Mexican filmmakers Alfonso Cuarón, and his son Jonás Cuarón attended the red carpet. The Asian Filmmaker of the Year Award was presented to Michelle Yeoh, while Ann Hui received the Camellia Award for her contribution to advancing women in cinema. The Korean Cinema Award went to BIFF founder Kim Dong-ho.

The opening ceremony concluded with the introduction of the seven-member Competition jury, chaired by Zhang Yimou and featuring Choi Hee-seo, Bi Gan, Samal Yeslyamova, Kei Ishikawa, July Jung, and Tran Thi Bich Ngoc.

=== Closing ceremony ===
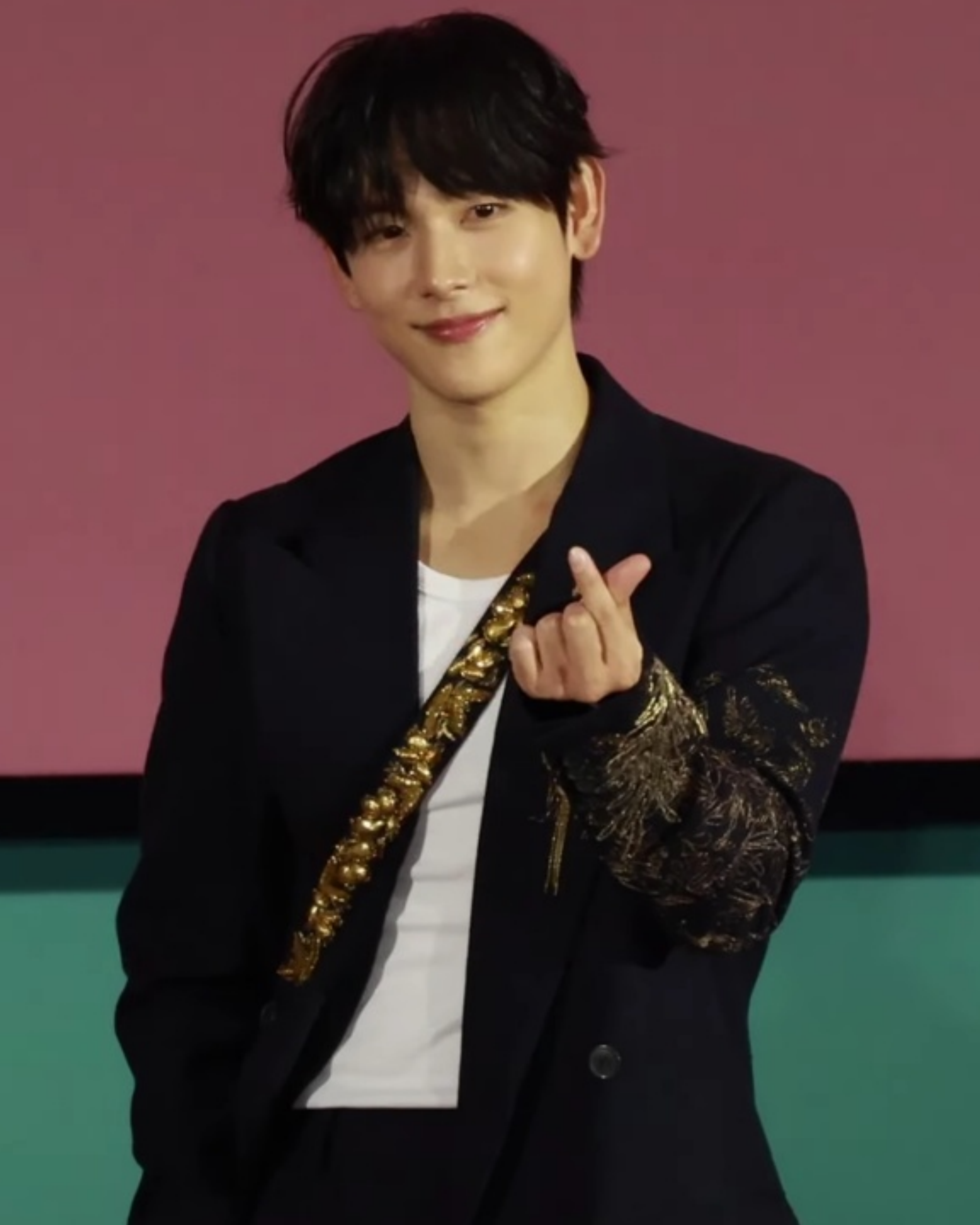
Yim Si-wan host of the closing ceremony

Yim Si-wan hosted the closing ceremony on October 15, 2026, where various awards were announced.

== Program sections ==
The programme for the festival was announced on September 1, with competition section featuring 14 films from Korea, Japan, China, Taiwan, Iran, Uzbekistan, and Indonesia.

The following sections will be there in the edition:

- Competition
- Gala Presentation
- Icons
- Vision
- A Window on Asian Cinema
- Korean Cinema Today - Special Premiere
- Korean Cinema Today - Panorama
- World Cinema
- Flash Forward
- Wide Angle
- Open Cinema
- Midnight Passion
- On Screen
- Special Program in Focus
  - ‘Those Beautiful Years, Ahn Sung-ki’
  - 'Carte Blanche'
  - Everything Everywhere All for Michelle
  - Japanese Animation Special: Masterpieces of Madness, Exhilarating Prospects 12+1
  - Special Screening

=== Opening film ===
English title	Original title	Director(s)	Production country(ies)
The Table: Day and Night	낮과 밤은 서로에게	Kim Jong-kwan	South Korea

=== Competition ===
The competition section of the festival features 13 Asian films selected for their artistic merit and regional significance.

† Indicates award winner.

English title	Original title	Director(s)	Production country(ies)
Beach Fictions	그날의 태주	Lim Ha-yeon	South Korea
Between Two Lovers	このごにおよんで愛など	Nanako Hirose	Japan
The Day After Sunday	日曜のあと	Takuya Kato	Japan
The First Taste of Loneliness	初次尝到寂寞	Gu You	China
Hilol	Ҳилол	Botir Abdurakhmanov	Uzbekistan
Long Long Night	긴긴밤	Youm Kyu-bock	South Korea
Midday Meal †	غذای نیمروز	Majid Majidi	Iran
My Mother	IBUKU	Eddie Cahyono	Indonesia, Japan
Satoko Always	さとこはいつも	Shuichi Okita	Japan
The Sea Speaks His Name	Laut Bercerita	Yosep Anggi Noen	Indonesia
Shaving	면도	Kim Jung-hoon	South Korea
silver express	シルバー・エクスプレス	Miki Tanaka	Japan
To Be Ordinary	有用的人	Lee Yun-chan	Taiwan

=== Gala Presentation ===
In this section five films will be presented by their directors and casts, attending the presentation.

English title	Original title	Director(s)	Production country(ies)
All About Corinne	Ni vue, ni connue	Marc Fitoussi	France, Belgium
Dora	도라	July Jung	South Korea, France, Luxembourg
A Girl's Story	Mémoire de Fille	Judith Godrèche	France
It's My Time	魔方小姐	Bai Xue	China
Look Back	ルックバック	Hirokazu Kore-eda	Japan
Paradise Lost	실낙원	Yeon Sang-ho	South Korea

=== Icons ===
This section showcases 35 latest works by veteran filmmakers.

English title	Original title	Director(s)	Production country(ies)
All of a Sudden	Soudain / 急に具合が悪くなる	Ryusuke Hamaguchi	France, Japan, Germany, Belgium
Back to Buenos Aires	Ritorno a Buenos Aires	Marco Bechis	Italy, Brazil
The Beloved	El ser querido	Rodrigo Sorogoyen	Spain, France
Bitter Christmas	Amarga Navidad	Pedro Almodóvar	Spain
Bucking Fastard		Werner Herzog	Ireland, United States
Coward		Lukas Dhont	Belgium, France, Netherlands
The Diary of a Chambermaid	Le Journal d'une Femme de Chambre	Radu Jude	France, Romania
Dust	微塵	Tsai Ming-liang	Taiwan, Spain
The Echo Chamber		Andrea Pallaoro	Italy, Belgium
Fatherland	Vaterland	Paweł Pawlikowski	Poland, France, Italy, Germany
Fjord		Cristian Mungiu	Romania, Norway, Denmark, Finland, France, Sweden
From Inside Out – The Architecture of Peter Zumthor		Wim Wenders	Germany, Switzerland
It Will Happen Tonight	Succederà questa notte	Nanni Moretti	Italy, France, Spain
Let Us Through, Dear Ancestors	Makikiraan po	Lav Diaz	Philippines
A Long Winter		Andrew Haigh	Canada, United Kingdom
The Man I Love		Ira Sachs	United States, France
Minotaur	Минотавр	Andrey Zvyagintsev	France, Latvia, Germany
Mother Mary		David Lowery	United States, Germany
Moulin		László Nemes	France
My Wife Cries	Meine Frau weint	Angela Schanelec	Germany, France
Nagi Notes	ナギダイアリー	Koji Fukada	Japan, Singapore, Philippines, Thailand, France
Nowhere to Lay My Eyes	눈둘데가 없네	Hong Sang-soo	South Korea
Orange-Flavoured Wedding	Mariage au goût d'orange	Christophe Honoré	France
Paper Tiger		James Gray	United States, Brazil
Parallel Tales	Histoires Parallèles	Asghar Farhadi	France, United States, Italy, Belgium
Possible Love	가능한 사랑	Lee Chang-dong	South Korea
Ray Gunn		Brad Bird	United States
Red Rocks	Les Roches Rouges	Bruno Dumont	France, Belgium, Italy, Portugal
Roma Elastica		Bertrand Mandico	France, Italy
Tender Loving Care		Mike Leigh	United Kingdom
Thanks for Coming	Merci d'Être Venu	Alain Cavalier	France
The Unknown	L'Inconnue	Arthur Harari	France
Wild Horse Nine		Martin McDonagh	United Kingdom, United States, Chile
Yellow Letters	Gelbe Briefe	İlker Çatak	Germany, France, Turkey
Zi		Kogonada	United States, Hong Kong

=== Vision ===
23 independent films from Asia, including Korea, will be showcased in this section.

English title	Original title	Director(s)	Production countrie(s)
Vision – Asia
1982		Nguyễn Hoàng Điệp	Vietnam
After the Song	はじまりのさよなら	Kumamoto Ryohei	Japan
Birds in the Dark	Hanere de Panchi	Shashank Walia	India
Bua		Intira Charoenpura, Phensiri Klangsurin	Thailand
The Cord		Darkhan Tulegenov	Kazakhstan
Dead End	被殺的那天	Isabella Lam Lok-hin	Hong Kong
Hinotama: Ball of Fire		Yaza Takenoshin	Japan
Ria		Arvin Belarmino	Philippines, Netherlands, Norway, Saudi Arabia, Japan
Selvi		Sailesh Rathnakumar	India, Saudi Arabia
Slumber		Mani Moghaddam	Iran
Zogsool		Sakhya Byamba	Mongolia, Germany
Vision – Korea
BALER	베일러	Oh Se-hyun	South Korea
Beyond Love’s Horizon	사랑의 지평선 너머로	Park Song-yeol	South Korea
The Birds	새	Son Hyun-rok	South Korea
Cosmic Trace	우주의 흔적	Jang Woo-jin	South Korea
Earbug	귀벌레	Park Kun-young	South Korea
Full Moon	풀문	Jung Ji-hye	South Korea
The Flower	화곡사	Kim Si-jin	South Korea
Not For You	당신을 위한 것은 아닌	Shin Dong-min	South Korea
Nothing Has Happened Yet	아직 아무 일도 일어나지 않은	Shin Sun	South Korea
Some Detective	모종의 탐정	Kim Mi-young	South Korea
Space	스페이스	Park Kun-young	South Korea
Things I Left at the Theater	극장에 두고 온 것들	Park Geun-young	South Korea

=== A Window on Asian Cinema ===
English title	Original title	Director(s)	Production countrie(s)
9 Temples to Heaven	9 วัด สู่สวรรค์	Sompot Chidgasornpongse	Thailand, Singapore, France, Norway, China, Hong Kong, Indonesia, Qatar
About an Intimate Matter		Sandeep Kumar Paul	India, United States, United Kingdom
Big Little Things		Michelle Zhou	Hong Kong, United States
Birds on Ice		Sahil H. Shah	India
The Burning Giants	ยักษ์ไหม้	Phuttiphong Aroonpheng	Thailand, Singapore, France, Netherlands
Dhara		Anuruddha Jayasingha	Sri Lanka, Canada
Diary of a Mad Old Man		Wayne Wang	United States
Elephants in the Fog	तिनीहरू	Abinash Bikram Shah	Nepal, France, Germany, Brazil, Norway
Filipiñana		Rafael Manuel	Singapore, United Kingdom, Philippines, France, Netherlands
Four Seasons in Java	Empat Musim Pertiwi	Kamila Andini	Indonesia, France, Netherlands, Norway, Poland, Saudi Arabia, Singapore
The Gate of Murder	殺人の門	Kanai Ko	Japan
A Girl Unknown	无名女孩	Zou Jing	China, France
Gu Shi		Amie Song	United States, Hong Kong, Thailand
Happily Ever After		Feng-I Fiona Roan	Taiwan
Head to Head		Ghasideh Golmakani	Iran, Germany
Hearing	Thính Giác	Lê Bảo	Singapore, Vietnam, Norway, France, Indonesia, Saudi Arabia, Cambodia, Thailand, Taiwan
In My Father's Room	無用の人	Harada Maha	Japan
In Winter		Yerlan Nurmukhambetov, Nursultan Nuskabekov	Kazakhstan
Khoriya		Vishwendra Singh	India
Lovers in the Blue Night		Anuparna Roy	India, United States
No Good Men	Kabul Jan	Shahrbanoo Sadat	Germany, France, Norway, Denmark, Afghanistan
Not a Hero	Kein Held	Rima Das	India, Singapore
Promised Spaces		Ivan Marković	France, Cambodia, Serbia, Germany
The Soul Whisperer	Chevittorma	Leo Thaddeus	Australia, India, France, Bangladesh
Spirit Guardians: The Last Secret of the First Emperor	Hộ Linh Tráng Sĩ: Bí ẩn mộ Vua Đinh	Nguyen Phan Quang Binh	Vietnam
The Violinist		Ervin Han, Raúl García	Singapore, Spain, Italy
Will You Still Be My Friend	日光	Lu Po-Shun	Taiwan, Singapore
You, Like a Star	汝、星のごとく	Michihito Fujii	Japan

=== Korean Cinema Today - Special Premiere ===
English title	Original title	Director(s)
Cattle Run	정가네	Kim Ji-hyun
Sapiens	사피엔스	Lee Hoo-bin
The Sorry Generation	세대유감	Kim Sung-yoon

=== Korean Cinema Today - Panorama ===
English title	Original title	Director(s)
Final Interview	최종면접	Kim Joung-hoon
Hope	호프	Na Hong-jin
Sinner	자필	Hong Sung-min
Still Shining	여전히 찬란하게	Song Il-gon
Ugly Duckling Ms. Maeng	수능, 출제의 비밀	Lee Yong-jae
The World Before	첫세계	Yoon Dan-bi

=== World Cinema ===
English title	Original title	Director(s)	Production country(ies)
Ben'Imana		Marie Clémentine Dusabejambo	Rwanda, Gabon, France, Norway, Ivory Coast
By Any Means		Elegance Bratton	United States
Clarissa		Arie Esiri and Chuko Esiri	United States, Nigeria, Egypt
Club Kid		Jordan Firstman	United States
Everybody Digs Bill Evans		Grant Gee	Ireland, United Kingdom
Everytime		Sandra Wollner	Austria, Germany
The Fire Within You	Il fuoco che ti porti dentro	Edoardo De Angelis	Italy
Gentle Monster		Marie Kreutzer	Austria, France, Germany
La Gradiva		Marine Atlan	France, Italy
La Perra		Dominga Sotomayor	Chile, Brazil
A Place to Heal	15/18	Cédric Kahn	France
Rose		Markus Schleinzer	Austria, Germany
Salvation	Kurtuluş	Emin Alper	France, Greece, Netherlands, Saudi Arabia, Sweden, Turkey
Woman Unknown	Kvinde ukendt	May el-Toukhy	Denmark

=== Flash Forward ===
English title	Original title	Director(s)	Production country(ies)
Bedford Park		Stephanie Ahn	United States
Black Church Bay		Rhys Marc Jones	United Kingdom
A Day in the Life of Jo: Chapter Phaedra	Mia mera sti zoi tis tzo: kefalaio Faidra	Jacqueline Lentzou	Greece, Germany, France
Eklipse		Manuel Wetscher	Austria, Italy
Föa - Once Upon a Future	Föa	Margherita Ferrari	Italy
La bola negra		Javier Calvo and Javier Ambrossi	Spain, France
A Man of His Time	Notre Salut	Emmanuel Marre	Belgium, France
The Meltdown	El deshielo	Manuela Martelli	Chile, United States, Spain, Mexico
Oasis	Oase	Jannis Lenz	Germany, Austria
Titanic Ocean		Konstantina Kotzamani	Greece, Germany, Romania, France, Spain
What Belongs to Others	Cudze rzeczy	Grzegorz Dębowski	Poland

=== Korean Short Film Competition ===
English title	Original title	Director(s)	Production countrie(s)
Afternoon on the Bridge		Ha Ji-hyung	South Korea
Amateur Energy		Tae Jiwon	South Korea
Baby Doe		Cho Heesoo	South Korea
The Boy Who Fell to Earth		Jung Jaeseo	South Korea
Dear Sunshine		Goo Jiyoon	South Korea
The Distant Home		Gong Seonjeong	South Korea
All of Her		KIM Nam-hyeon	South Korea
Tale of Tails		Shim Sujeong	South Korea
TOE′S		YUN Taerang	South Korea
Tomato Pasta Recipe		An Whae	South Korea
An Uninvited Neighbor		Cho Haein	France
The Variety		Chang Hyungyun	South Korea

=== Asian Short Film Competition ===
English title	Original title	Director(s)	Production countrie(s)
Beneath the Barren		Rajendra Budha	Nepal
Chumpa: A Doll Under the Basket		Rajesh Prasad Khatri	Nepal
Downwind		Chen Hung	Taiwan
Fatima		Soroush Shahpouri	Iran
In Our Panic		Xu Jianming	China
Salt Electric		Paromita Dhar	India, Canada, Estonia, France
She Said		Ivan Tan	Singapore
The Things That Vanish		Ikeda Kenta	Japan
Wild No More		Chang Ting Wei	Taiwan
αLPα		Dhiwangkara Seta	Indonesia

==== Documentary Competition ====
English title	Original title	Director(s)	Production countrie(s)
771 Days		Zainab Entezar	Afghanistan
ACROSS: Anatomy of the Forgotten War		Kim Ji	South Korea, Italy
AGAAR		Yang Bo	China, France
Can I Talk to You?		Yi Seungjun	South Korea
Dreams of the Wild Oaks		Marjan Khosravi	Iran, France, Spain
On the Road with Abbas Kiarostami		Seifollah Samadian	Iran
Recovery		Im Yeonjeong	South Korea
Revolving Lanterns		Matsui Itaru	Japan, United States
Soundweave		Yoon Juyoung	South Korea
A Woman Dancing on the Waves		Choi Se-dam	South Korea

==== Documentary Showcase ====
English title	Original title	Director(s)	Production countrie(s)
58th		Carl Joseph Papa	Philippines
Annyeong, Stellar		Ahn Jee-hwan	South Korea
Baby Jackfruit Baby Guava		Nong Nhat Quang	Vietnam, South Korea
The Best Days		Kim Byoungsoo	South Korea
Birds of War		Janay Boulos, Abd Alkader Habak	United Kingdom, Syria, Lebanon
Colors of White Rock		Khoroldorj Choijoovanchig	Mongolia, France
From Dawn to Dawn		Xisi Sofia Ye Chen	Spain, France
Gabin		Maxence Voiseux	France, Germany, Switzerland
Homesick		Taekyung Tanja Inwol Sørensen	South Korea, Denmark, Finland
Kim Yun Shin Punches In		Lim Sunae	South Korea
A Life of an Artist: Kwon Jinkyu		Min Hwanki	South Korea
Our Wish, Our Colors		Lee Yeo-jin	South Korea
Rehearsals for a Revolution		Pegah Ahangarani	Czech Republic, Spain, Iran
Time and Tide		Vee Shi	Australia
Union Town		Barbara Kopple	United States

=== Open Cinema ===
English title	Original title	Director(s)	Production country(s)
All About Corinne	Ni vue, ni connue	Marc Fitoussi	France, Belgium
The Holy Boy	La Valle dei Sorrisi	Paolo Strippoli	Italy, Slovenia
Inherit	คุณยายวรนาฏ	Banjong Pisanthanakun	Thailand
In the Clear Moonlit Dusk	うるわしの宵の月	Kentarō Takemura	Japan
Just an illusion	Juste une illusion	Éric Toledano	France
Look Back	ルックバック	Hirokazu Kore-eda	Japan
The Sorry Generation	세대유감	Kim Sung-yoon	South Korea
The Spiral	L'estranea	Paolo Strippoli	Italy, France, Belgium
The Violinist		Raul Garcia, Ervin Han	Spain, Singapore

=== Midnight Passion ===
English title	Original title	Director(s)	Production country(s)
Angel's Egg	天使のたまご	Mamoru Oshii	Japan ka
The Chain of Roses	薔薇の鎖	Sakichi Sato	Japan
Jim Queen	Jim Queen à la recherche de la Chloroqueer	Marco Nguyen, Nicolas Athané	France, Belgium
L'Autre		Alexandre Franchi	Canada
~~Red Thread~~	~~Sợi Chỉ Đỏ~~	~~Ham Tran~~	~~Vietnam~~
Sapiens	사피엔스	Lee Hu-bin	South Korea
The Scar-Faced Cat: Way of Asura	花臉貓：修羅道	Wang I-Fan	Taiwan
The Spiral	L'estranea	Paolo Strippoli	Italy, France, Belgium
Welcome to Dolly′s House	Huanyíng lái dào duo lì zhi jia	Seven Ych, Rady Fu, Tree Muta	Taiwan

=== On Screen ===
Two to four episodes of the series will be screened in this section.

English title	Original title	Director(s)	Production country(ies)	Platform / Network
The Remarried Empress	재혼 황후	Jo Soo-won	South Korea	Disney+
Dead-End Job	꿀알바	Han Jun-hee, Kim Da-min	South Korea	Netflix
The Blue Road	푸른길	Han Jun-hee	South Korea	Netflix

== Special program in focus ==
=== ‘Those Beautiful Years, Ahn Sung-ki’ ===
In a special program in collaboration with the Korean Film Archive to revisit the life of actor Ahn Sung-ki, who died in January 2026, the festival will run 6 films.

Year	English title	Original title	Director(s)
1980	A Fine, Windy Day	바람 불어 좋은 날	Lee Jang-ho
1984	Whale Hunting	고래사냥	Bae Chang-ho
1988	Chilsu and Mansu	칠수와 만수	Park Kwang-su
1988	Gagman	개그맨	Lee Myung-se
1992	White Badge	하얀전쟁	Chung Ji-young
1996	Festival	축제	Im Kwon-taek

=== 'Carte Blanche' ===
The program includes screenings of films selected by notable individuals from the film and cultural sectors, followed by audience discussions featuring their personal experiences and analytical insights.

Year	English title	Original title	Director(s)	Production country	Selected by
1979	Mad Max		George Miller	Australia	Kim Jee-woon
2016	The Handmaiden	아가씨	Park Chan-wook	South Korea	Fan Bingbing
1993	Three Colours: Blue	Trois couleurs: Bleu	Krzysztof Kieślowski	France, Poland, Switzerland	Hong Kyung-pyo

=== Everything Everywhere All for Michelle ===
Year	English title	Original title	Director(s)	Production country
2010	Reign of Assassins	劍雨	John Woo	China, Hong Kong, Taiwan
2022	Everything Everywhere All at Once		Daniel Kwan and Daniel Scheinert	United States
2026	Sandiwara		Sean Baker	United States, Malaysia

=== Japanese Animation Special: Masterpieces of Madness, Exhilarating Prospects 12+1 ===
English title	Original title	Director(s)	Production countrie(s)
Belladonna of Sadness	哀しみのベラドンナ	Eiichi Yamamoto	Japan
ghost – end of night		Shingo Natsume	Japan
Kakurenbo	カクレンボ	Shuhei Morita	Japan
The King and the Mockingbird	Le Roi et l'Oiseau	Paul Grimault	France
Memories		Katsuhiro Otomo, Koji Morimoto, Tensai Okamura	Japan
Metropolis	メトロポリス	Rintaro	Japan
Mind Game	マインド・ゲーム,	Masaaki Yuasa	Japan
A New Dawn	花緑青が明ける日に	Yoshitoshi Shinomiya	Japan, France
Phoenix 2772	火の鳥2772 愛のコスモゾーン, Hi no Tori 2772	Osamu Tezuka	Japan
Shiranui		Ryo Katanosaka	Japan
We Are Aliens		Kohei Kadowaki	Japan, France
The White Snake Enchantress	白蛇伝	Taiji Yabushita	Japan

=== Special Screening ===
Year	English title	Original title	Director(s)	Production country(ies)
1956	Bus Stop		Joshua Logan	United States
2026	Cold War 1994	寒戰	Longman Leung	Hong Kong
2026	Flesh Impact		Maggie Gyllenhaal	United States
2013	Gravity		Alfonso Cuarón	United States
2016	The Handmaiden	아가씨	Park Chan-wook	South Korea
2007	M (4K Remastering)	엠	Lee Myung-se	South Korea
2011	Melancholia		Lars von Trier	Denmark, Sweden, France, Germany

== Asian Contents & Film Market ==
The 21st edition of film market, a parallel event of the festival will run from October 10 to 13 at the Exhibition Center 2, of the Busan Exhibition and Convention Center, Busan. Japan is selected as the "Country of the Year – Producer Hub", as such ten Japanese producers will visit the market to introduce their country's projects and explore cooperation from producers of the various nations.

== Awards and winners ==
Busan Awards were announced in closing gala on October 15, 2026.

=== Busan Awards ===
- Best Film Award: Midday Meal by Majid Majidi
- Special Jury Award: My Mother by Eddie Cahyono
- Best Director Award: Lee Yun-chan for To Be Ordinary
- Best Actor Award:
  - Zhou Xun for The First Taste of Loneliness
  - Kashun Himeno for Satoko Always
- Artistic Contribution Award: Li Danfeng (sound director) for The First Taste of Loneliness
- New Currents Award: Birds in the Dark by Shashank Walia
  - New Currents Award (Special Mention): Beach Fictions by Lim Ha-yeon

=== Busan Vision Awards ===
Busan Vision Awards were announced on October 14.

- Actor of the Year:
  - Won Hyang-ra for Beyond Love′s Horizon
  - Kang Seung-ho for Cosmic Trace
- Flash Forward Audience Award: La Bola Negra by Javier Calvo and Javier Ambrossi
- Documentary Audience Award: Recovery by Im Yeonjeong
- BIFF Mecenat Award:
  - Korea: Can I Talk to You?
  - Asia: AGAAR
  - Special Mention: A Woman Dancing on the Waves
- Sonje Award:
  - Korea: TOE′S
  - Asia: Fatima
  - Special Mention: The Boy Who Fell to Earth
- NETPAC Award: Zogsool by Sakhya Byamba
- FIPRESCI Award: Zogsool by Sakhya Byamba
- Bishkek International Film Festival-Central Asia Union Award: There Will Be Snow by Chen Jianying (Story)
- Face of the Future Award: After the Song by Kumamoto Ryohei
- The Heart of Eurasia Award: Ria by Arvin Belarmino
- Hylife Vision Award:
  - Zogsool by Sakhya Byamba
  - Selvi by Sailesh Rathnakumar
- International Film Festival of India-Vision Asia Award: The Cord by Darkhan Tulegenov
- Songwon Vision Award: Birds in the Dark by Shashank Walia
- Taipei Film Commission Award: Selvi by Sailesh Rathnakumar
- Vision of Jiseok Award: Zogsool by Sakhya Byamba
- DGK PLUS M Award: The Flower by Kim Si-jin
- CGV Award: FULL MOON by Jeong Ji-hye
- KBS Independent Film Award: Beyond Love′s Horizon by Park Songyeol
- Critic B Award: Beyond Love′s Horizon by Park Songyeol
- Busan Cinephile Award: Birds of War by Janay BOULOS, Abd ALKADER HABAK
- Citizen Critic's Award: BALER by Oh Sehyeon
- K-MOVIE Award: FULL MOON by Jeong Ji-hye
- Jeong-in Award: BALER by Oh Sehyeon
- Songwon Vision Audience Award - Korea: FULL MOON by Jeong Ji-hye

=== Honours ===
- The Asian Filmmaker of the Year
  - Michelle Yeoh, Malaysian actress

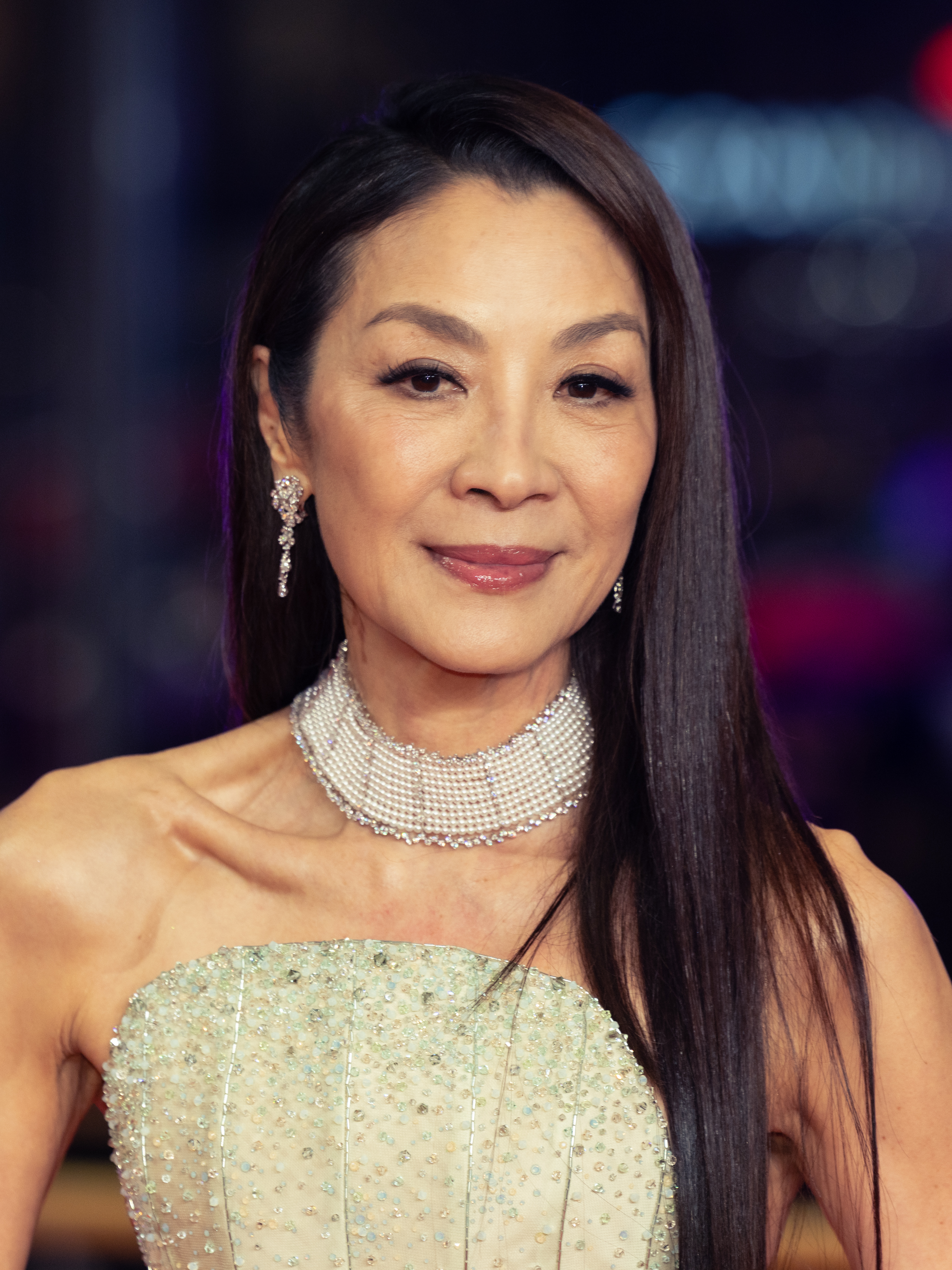
Michelle Yeoh recipient of The Asian Filmmaker of the Year award

- Camellia Award:
  - Ann Hui, Hong Kong filmmaker and actress

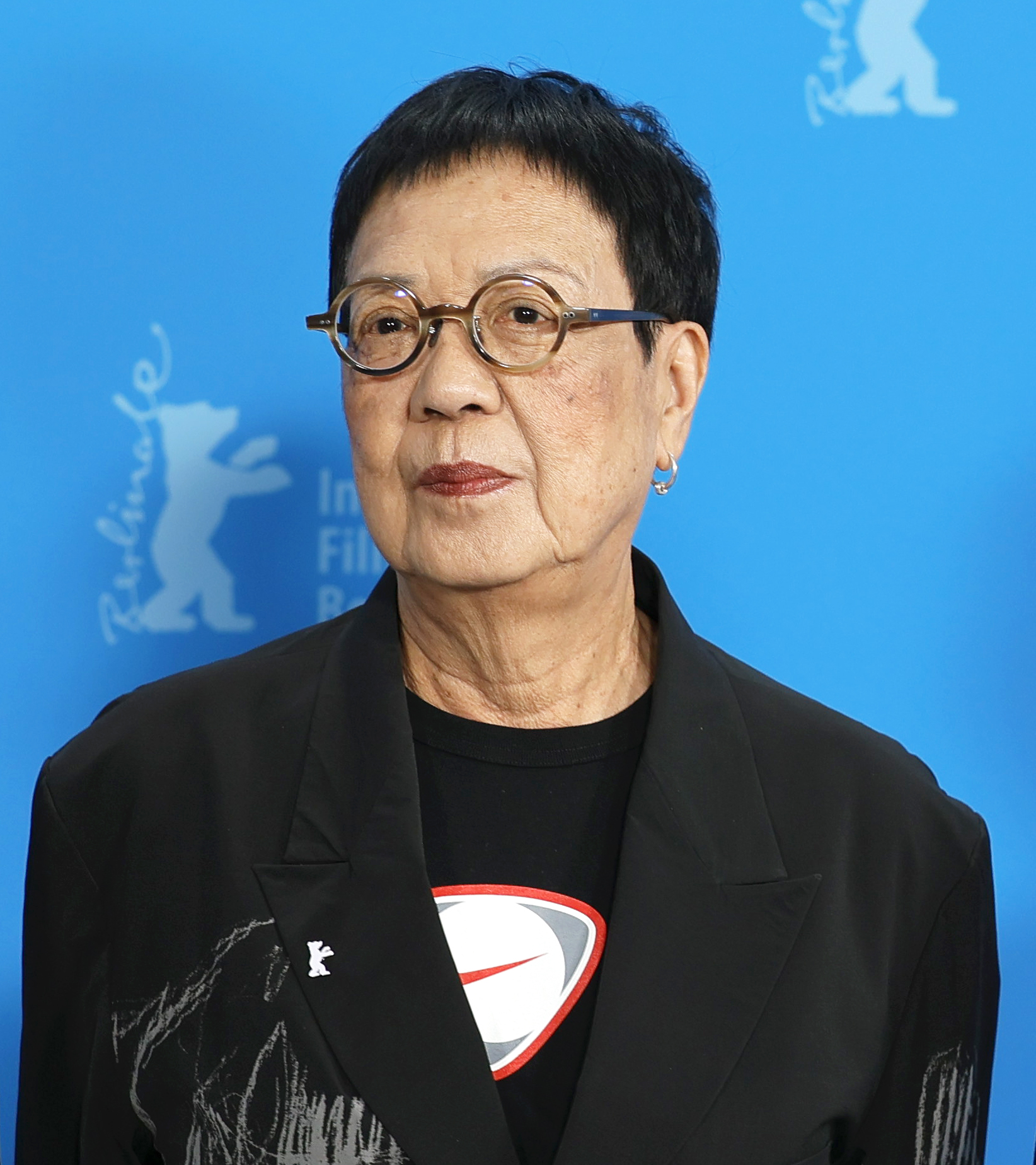
Ann Hui recipient of Camellia Award

- Korean Film Achievement Award:
  - Kim Dong-ho, former Chairman of the Busan International Film Festival
