= The First Taste of Loneliness =

- International teaser poster
- Simplified Chinese: 初次尝到寂寞
- Hanyu Pinyin: Chūcì cháng dào jìmò
- Directed by: Gu You
- Written by: Gu You; Yang Yikun
- Produced by: Shan Zuolong; Du Kexin; Mathieu Robinet
- Starring: Zhou Xun; Xi Meijuan; Wang Shengdi; Zhou Yiwei; Mu Zhicheng; Xu Chaoying
- Cinematography: Mikiya Takimoto
- Edited by: Liu Xinzhu
- Music by: Sylvian Wang
- Production companies: Tandem Films; Hangzhou Enlightenment Films
- Distributed by: Tandem Films; Les Films du Losange
- Release date: October 7, 2026 (BIFF)
- Running time: 135 minutes
- Countries: China; France
- Language: Mandarin

The First Taste of Loneliness (Chinese: 初次尝到寂寞; formerly titled A Moon for Every River) is a 2026 Chinese-France drama film co-written and directed by Gu You, starring Zhou Xun, Xi Meijuan, Wang Shengdi, Zhou Yiwei, Mu Zhicheng and Xu Chaoying. The Chinese title refers to "The First Taste of Loneliness (初次尝到寂寞)", a song by Teresa Teng that is featured near the end of the film. The film follows three generations of women as they navigate grief and loneliness after the death of a beloved father. It is the last instalment of Gu's "Shan-Shui (Landscape) trilogy" following Dwelling in the Fuchun Mountains (2019) and Dwelling by the West Lake (2023).

The film had its world premiere in the Main Competition section at the 31st Busan International Film Festival on October 7, 2026, where it won the Busan Award for Best Actor for Zhou Xun and the Busan Award for Artistic Contribution for sound director Li Danfeng.

== Synopsis ==
The film tells the story of Jiang Yue (Zhou Xun), a middle-aged woman, struggles with grief following the death of her father. As she gradually comes to terms with her loss, she discovers that her mother (Xi Meijuan) has quietly begun a new relationship and finds a wish list left by her father before his death. These discoveries reveal the emotional connections between three generations of women. Spanning the lives of the elderly, middle-aged, and younger generations, the film explores themes of loneliness, love, death, and healing.

== Cast ==
- Zhou Xun as Jiang Yue
- Xi Meijuan as Luna (Jiang Yue's mother)
- Wang Shengdi as Mu En (Jiang Yue's daughter)
- Zhou Yiwei
- Mu Zhicheng
- Xu Chaoying as Mr. Xu

== Production ==
Principal photography officially began in Hangzhou on May 15, 2025. Filming wrapped on June 16, 2025. In October 2025, the project was shortlisted for the "Red Sea Souk Works-in-Progress" section at the Red Sea Souk Project Market 2025 during 2025 Red Sea International Film Festival.

== Release ==
Producer Du Kexi, director Gu You, actresses Wang Shengdi and Zhou Xun, producer Shan Zuolong, cinematographer Mikiya Takimoto and sound director Li Danfeng during the press conference at the 31st Busan International Film Festival

The First Taste of Loneliness had its world premiere in the Main Competition section of the 31st Busan International Film Festival on October 7, 2026, the first edition of the festival to receive FIAPF accreditation as an A-list film festival.

The film was also screened in the International Feature Competition section of the 32nd Geneva International Film Festival on November 4, 2026, competeing for Reflet d'Or for Best Feature.

== Reception ==
=== Critical response ===
Allan Hunter of Screen Daily praised the film's nuanced exploration of love, loss and the meaning of life, noting how it gradually develops beyond its initial sentimentality into a philosophical reflection on grief and the passage of time. He commended Zhou Xun's understated performance, writing that she imbued Yue with "a sense of accumulated wisdom and a generosity of spirit that is immensely appealing", and highlighted her chemistry with co-star Xi Meijuan. Meanwhile, Le Hong Lam of Cine21 writing from the Busan International Film Festival commended the film's poetic and contemplative portrayal of loss, loneliness and healing through the experiences of three generations of women. He highlighted Gu You's restrained storytelling, lengthy long takes and visual imagery, describing the film as a fitting conclusion to his Landscape trilogy. Zhou was particularly praised for her restrained portrayal of a single mother attempting to move forward after loss.

=== Accolades ===
The film competed for various Vision Awards at Busan International Film Festival.

Award	Date of ceremony	Category	Recipient(s)	Result	Ref.
Busan International Film Festival	October 15, 2026	Busan Award for Best Film	The First Taste of Loneliness	Nominated	
Busan International Film Festival	October 15, 2026	Busan Award for Best Actor	Zhou Xun	Won	
Busan International Film Festival	October 15, 2026	Busan Award for Artistic Contribution	Li Danfeng (sound director)	Won	
Geneva International Film Festival	November 8, 2026	Reflet d'Or for Best Feature	The First Taste of Loneliness	Nominated	
