= Uprising (2024 film) =

2024 film by Kim Sang-man

- Release poster
- Hangul: 전,란
- Hanja: 戰,亂
- Lit.: War and Revolt
- RR: Jeon,ran
- MR: Chŏn,ran
- Directed by: Kim Sang-man
- Written by: Shin Cheol; Park Chan-wook
- Produced by: Park Chan-wook; Yoon Suk-chan; Baek Ji-sun; Go Dae-suk
- Starring: Gang Dong-won; Park Jeong-min; Kim Shin-rok; Jin Seon-kyu; Jung Sung-il; Cha Seung-won
- Cinematography: Ju Sung-rim
- Edited by: Han Mi-yeon
- Music by: Jo Yeong-wook
- Production companies: Moho Film; Semicolon Studio
- Distributed by: Netflix
- Release dates: October 2, 2024 (BIFF); October 11, 2024 (Netflix)
- Running time: 126 minutes
- Country: South Korea
- Language: Korean

Uprising (Korean: 전,란; RR: Jeon,ran) is a 2024 South Korean historical war action film directed by Kim Sang-man, written by Shin Cheol and Park Chan-wook, and starring Gang Dong-won, Park Jeong-min, Kim Shin-rok, Jin Seon-kyu, Jung Sung-il, and Cha Seung-won. The film depicts the lives of two childhood friends-turned-adversaries during Japanese invasions of Korea. It had its first premiere as opening film of the 29th Busan International Film Festival on October 2, 2024, and was released on Netflix on October 11, 2024.

== Plot ==
Cheon Yeong, a slave with remarkable martial prowess who struggles to break free from an unjust servitude, and Jong-ryeo, Cheon Yeong's master, meet again as enemies of King Seonjo's closest military officer and volunteer soldier during a time of chaos.

== Cast ==
- Gang Dong-won as Cheon Yeong, a man with the best swordsmanship skills
  - Jin Jae-hee as young Cheon Yeong
- Park Jeong-min as Lee Jong-ryeo, the son of Joseon's highest military official and King Seonjo's closest military officer
  - Lee Yoon-sang as young Jong-ryeo
- Cha Seung-won as Seonjo of Joseon.
- Kim Shin-rok as Beom-dong, a member of the civilian militia
- Jin Seon-kyu as Kim Ja-ryeong, a civilian militia leader
- Jung Sung-il as Genshin, the cruel vanguard of the Japanese army
- Oh Yoon-hong as Jong-ryeo's mother
- Kim Hyun

== Production ==
In June 2023, Park Chan-wook revealed that he was writing the film's script "for a long time, but [he] finished it in 2019". Because Park was busy filming HBO's The Sympathizer, Kim Sang-man directed the film instead.

On June 7, 2023, Netflix confirmed production of the film with the casting of Gang Dong-won, Park Jeong-min, Cha Seung-won, Kim Shin-rok, Jin Seon-kyu, Jung Sung-il.

== Release ==
Uprising was confirmed to first premiere as an opening film of the 29th Busan International Film Festival on October 2, 2024. The film was released on October 11, 2024.

== Accolades ==
Award	Year	Category	Recipient(s)	Result	Ref.
Baeksang Arts Awards	2025	Best Film	Uprising	Nominated	
Baeksang Arts Awards	2025	Best Supporting Actor	Park Jeong-min	Nominated	
Baeksang Arts Awards	2025	Best New Actor	Jung Sung-il	Won	
Baeksang Arts Awards	2025	Best Screenplay	Shin Cheol, Park Chan-wook	Won	
Baeksang Arts Awards	2025	Best Technical Achievement	Jo Yeong-wook (Score)	Won	
Blue Dragon Film Awards	2025	Best New Actor	Jung Sung-il	Nominated	
Blue Dragon Film Awards	2025	Best Screenplay	Shin Cheol, Park Chan-wook	Nominated	
Blue Dragon Film Awards	2025	Best Cinematography and Lighting	Ju Sung-rim, Choi Jong-ha	Nominated	
Blue Dragon Film Awards	2025	Best Art Direction	Lee Na-kyum	Won	
Blue Dragon Film Awards	2025	Best Music	Jo Yeong-wook, Lee Myeong-ro, Kwon So-hyun, Shin Hyun-ji	Nominated	
Buil Film Awards	2025	Best Film	Uprising	Nominated	
Buil Film Awards	2025	Best Supporting Actor	Park Jeong-min	Won	
Buil Film Awards	2025	Best Screenplay	Shin Cheol, Park Chan-wook	Nominated	
Buil Film Awards	2025	Best Cinematography	Joo Sung-rim	Nominated	
Buil Film Awards	2025	Best Art/Technical Award	Jo Sang-kyung	Nominated	
Buil Film Awards	2025	Best Music	Jo Yeong-wook	Nominated	
Director's Cut Awards	2025	Best New Actress (Film)	Kim Shin-rok	Nominated	
