= To Be Ordinary =

2026 coming-of-age Taiwanese film

- Promotional poster
- Chinese: 有用的人
- Literally: Useful person
- Directed by: Lee Yun-chan
- Screenplay by: Lee Yun Chan; Wang Ginger
- Produced by: Lin inch; Chang Alvin
- Starring: Weber Yang; Winnie Chang; Liang Hsiu-shen
- Cinematography: Lee Ming
- Edited by: Su Ling Tu
- Music by: Cicada
- Production company: Goer Film Co. Ltd
- Distributed by: Mandarin Vision Co. Ltd
- Release dates: October 11, 2026 (BIFF); October 30, 2026 (Japan)
- Running time: 112 minutes
- Country: Taiwan
- Language: Mandarin

To Be Ordinary (Chinese: 有用的人) is a 2026 Taiwanese coming-of-age drama film co-written and directed by Lee Yun-chan. Starring Weber Yang and Winnie Chang, it follows an urban family, which is destabilised when an unexpected accident breaks their balance.

The film had its world premiere and competed in the Competition section of the 31st Busan International Film Festival on October 11, 2026 for 'Busan Awards', where it won Best Director award for Lee Yun-chan.

== Synopsis ==
Yu Jie, a 22-year-old college student and part-time web designer, meets a motorcycle accident while returning home from work. The accident leaves him permanently dependent on a wheelchair. The elderly driver responsible for the accident, overwhelmed by guilt, transfers ownership of his house to Yu Jie's family and provides money for his medical treatment and living expenses. These actions help ease the family's financial difficulties, but, he continues to blame himself for what happened. Yu Jie's father, who has been unemployed for several years, becomes his main caregiver, while his mother devotes herself to looking after her children. The family, which had been struggling both financially and emotionally, gradually begins to reconnect, sharing dinner together every evening in their new home. Yu Jie also develops a close relationship with his caregiver Yi-han, who also quietly develops feelings for him.

However, Yu Jie's younger sister gradually understands the painful reality behind the family's improved circumstances, which came at the cost of her brother's life being permanently changed by the accident.

== Cast ==
- Weber Yang
- Winnie Chang
- Liang Hsiu-shen
- Junior Hsieh
- Chen Pin Hsuan

== Release ==
To Be Ordinary had its World Premiere in the Competition section of the 31st Busan International Film Festival on October 11, 2026 and vied for 'Busan Awards'.

The film will be screened for Japanese Premiere on 30 October 2026 in the World Focus section of the 39th Tokyo International Film Festival.

Taiwanese production and sales company Mandarin Vision acquired the International sales rights in September 2026, before the Busan International Film Festival premiere of the film.

== Accolades ==
The film competed for various Vision Awards at Busan International Film Festival.

Award	Date of ceremony	Category	Recipient(s)	Result	Ref.
Busan International Film Festival	15 October 2026	Busan Awards: Best Film	To Be Ordinary	Nominated	
Busan International Film Festival	15 October 2026	Busan Awards: Best Director	Lee Yun-chan	Won	

== Reception ==
The film premiered in the Competition section of the 31st Busan International Film Festival on 11 October 2026 and won the Best Director award for Lee Yun-chan at the festival's closing ceremony on 15 October 2026. It was the only Taiwanese film in the festival's competition line-up.
