= Birds in the Dark =

2026 Indian Intersectional Narrative Film

- Promotional poster
- Directed by: Shashank Walia
- Written by: Shashank Walia
- Produced by: Reema Kaur; Hansal Mehta; Sahil Saigal
- Starring: Navdeep Bajwa
- Cinematography: Shashank Walia
- Edited by: Reema Kaur
- Production companies: Two Black Squares; True Story Films
- Release date: 10 October 2026 (BIFF)
- Country: India
- Language: Punjabi

Birds in the Dark (Hanere de Panchi) is a 2026 Indian Punjabi-language film written, directed and cinematographed by Shashank Walia. Produced by Reema Kaur, Hansal Mehta and Sahil Saigal, it is set in rural Punjab, and features dialects of Punjabi, Kashmiri and Urdu. It had its world premiere at the 31st Busan International Film Festival, in the Vision Asia section on 10 October 2026, where it won New Currents Award for Shashank Walia.

== Premise ==
A disillusioned police informer and a man he once wrongly captured find their way back to each other in a caste-divided village, where a landless woman's fight for land unsettles the old order, pulling their lives into a gathering struggle of desire and solidarity.

== Cast ==
- Mauli Singh
- Sapna Das
- Harwinder Singh Aujila
- Navdeep Bajwa
- Shahnawaz Bhat

== Production ==
In March 2025, it was reported that Hansal Mehta would produce the film with Reema Kaur and Sahil Saigal, which is directed by Shashank Walia, and co-produced by Mauli Singh, and Gagan Deep Kaur.

Post-Production

The film's sound design by Shashank Kothari is noted for its atmospheric, textured and layered soundscape.

== Release ==
Birds in the Dark had its world premiere at the 31st Busan International Film Festival in the Vision – Asia section on 10 October 2026.

The poster of the film was released on 5 October before the world premiere at the Busan International Film Festival. The poster art is designed by Siva Chand M S, with typography by Sudarshan Devadoss. It depicts the film's focus on how caste, class, gender, land and work shape people's lives, while also highlighting broader themes that run through the story.

== Accolades ==
The film will compete for the Vision Awards at the 31st Busan International Film Festival.

Award	Date of ceremony	Category	Recipient(s)	Result	Ref.
Busan International Film Festival	15 October 2026	Vision Awards: Songwon Vision Award	Birds in the Dark	Won	
Busan International Film Festival	15 October 2026	New Currents Award	Shashank Walia	Won	
