= Busan Award for Best Film =

Highest prize of the Busan International Film Festival

- 2026 recipient: Midday Meal by Majid Majidi
- Country: South Korea
- Presented by: Busan International Film Festival
- First award: 2025
- Currently held by: Midday Meal by Majid Majidi (2026)

The Busan Award for Best Film (Korean: 부산 어워드 대상) is the highest prize awarded for the best film at the Busan International Film Festival. It was first awarded in 2025. The prize is given to the most outstanding film in Competition, recognizing exceptional aesthetic achievement. The director and the producer of winning film equally shares a grand prize of KRW 50 million.

== History ==
In 2025, to mark its 30th anniversary, the Busan International Film Festival introduced a new competition section and presented several awards under the Busan Awards category, including Best Film, Best Director, the Special Jury Prize, Best Actor (awarded to two individuals), and the Artistic Contribution Award.

Since 2026, the winner of the Busan Award - Best Film Award of the festival's Competition section, has been included in a new eligibility pathway for the Academy Award for Best International Feature Film. As per The Academy of Motion Picture Arts and Sciences revised rules, films awarded the Golden Bear for Best Film, Busan Award for Best Film, Palme d’Or, Sundance Film Festival - World Cinema Grand Jury Prize, Platform Prize and Golden Lion are eligible for consideration in the Best International Feature Film category without the need for official national selection. In the same year, Busan International Film Festival was also recognized as an "A Festival" under the revised accreditation framework of the International Federation of Film Producers Associations (FIAPF) and is one of 17 film festivals worldwide to hold the designation. After automatically qualified under the category's new rules as the 2026 Busan Award for Best Film winner, Majid Majidi's Midday Meal are submitted for consideration in the Best International Feature Film category at the 99th Academy Awards.

== Winners ==
Year	English title	Original title	Director(s)	Production country	Ref.
2025	Gloaming in Luomu	罗目的黄昏	Zhang Lü	China	
2026	Midday Meal	غذای نیمروز	Majid Majidi	Iran	
