= Winnie Chang =

Taiwanese actress

- Chang Shih-Ying, actress, at the 2026 Busan International Film Festival (BIFF) in Busan, South Korea for "To Be Ordinary".
- Born: Taiwan
- Other name: Zhang Shiying
- Education: Taipei National University of the Arts
- Occupation: Actress
- Years active: 2002–present

Chinese name
- Traditional Chinese: 張詩盈
Transcriptions
Standard Mandarin
- Hanyu Pinyin: Zhāng Shīyíng

Winnie Chang Shih-ying is a Taiwanese actress. She began her career on stage in 2002 and became known for her role in the 2010 film Seven Days in Heaven. In 2019, she starred in the film The Teacher and won the Golden Horse Award for Best Supporting Actress.

== Selected filmography ==
=== Film ===
Year	English title	Original title	Role	Notes
2010	Seven Days in Heaven	父後七日	Chin	
2012	Flying Dragon, Dancing Phoenix	龍飛鳳舞	Shi-ying	
2012	Cha Cha for Twins	寶米恰恰	Mei-chia	
2014	Anywhere Somewhere Nowhere	到不了的地方	Head nurse	
2014	Live at Love	活路：妒忌私家偵探社	Feng Shih-hui	
2015	Love in Vain	獨一無二	Hui-chen	
2016	Black Sheep	兒子老子	Liang Yue-fen	
2018	The Outsiders	鬥魚	Instructor	
2019	The Teacher	我的靈魂是愛做的	Gao's wife	
2024	Yen and Ai-Lee	小雁與吳愛麗	Linda	
2026	To Be Ordinary	有用的人		

=== Television series ===
Year	English title	Original title	Role	Notes
2011	Way Back Into Love	愛。回來	Vironica Kuan	
2013	Love SOS	愛情急整室	Mei-hsiu	
2014	Apple in Your Eye	妹妹	A&Z employee	
2016	The Age of Innocence	多桑の純萃年代	Young A-xue	
2016	House of Toy Bricks	植劇場－積木之家	Liu Ya-ling	
2017	Fragrance of Family Love	稻香家味	Yue-hong	
2018	Befriend	人際關係事務所	Ting Chu-di	
2019	The Making of An Ordinary Woman	俗女養成記	Hui-ping	

== Awards and nominations ==
Year	Award	Category	Nominated work	Result
2010	12th Taipei Film Awards	Best Supporting Actress	Seven Days in Heaven	Won
2010	47th Golden Horse Awards	Best Supporting Actress	Seven Days in Heaven	Nominated
2010	47th Golden Horse Awards	Best New Performer	Seven Days in Heaven	Nominated
2019	56th Golden Horse Awards	Best Supporting Actress	The Teacher	Won
