= Sinner (2026 film) =

- Hangul: 자필
- Lit.: Handwritten
- RR: Japil
- MR: Chap'il
- Directed by: Hong Sung-min
- Written by: Hong Sung-min
- Produced by: Song Hyo-jung; Yang Yun-sik; Lee Na-ra; Moon Hyun-sung
- Starring: Jung Sung-il; Park Ji-hyun
- Production companies: Blue Fire Studio; StoneV Studio
- Distributed by: Redice Entertainment
- Release date: October 7, 2026; (BIFF)
- Running time: 110 minutes
- Country: South Korea
- Language: Korean

Sinner (Korean: 자필) is a 2026 South Korean drama film written and directed by Hong Sung-min for his feature film directorial debut. The film follows Kim Seok-gyu, a Minister of Justice nominee preparing for his confirmation hearing, as he reveals the truth behind a former criminal case through letters penned by Hong Sun-hwa, South Korea's last death row inmate. The film had its world premiere at the 31st Busan International Film Festival on October 7, 2026, as part of the Korean Cinema Today - Panorama section.

== Synopsis ==
When prosecutor Kim Seok-gyu is nominated for Minister of Justice, the opposition party raises questions about the 1994 "Migeum Arson-Murder Case”. They allege that he conducted a coercive investigation against the illiterate suspect Hong Sun-hwa and sought the death penalty. The controversy subsides when a letter left by Hong comes to light. However, after reading her plea for her innocence to be conveyed to her son Eun-su, Seok-gyu begins to reinvestigate the closed case.

== Cast ==
- Jung Sung-il as Kim Seok-gyu
- Park Ji-hyun as Hong Sun-hwa
- Lee Jun-young as Eun-su
  - Yang Woo-hyuk as young Eunsu

Sun-hwa’s son.

== Production ==
Filming concluded on August 26, 2025.

The film was included in the 2026 Cannes Film Market lineup.

== Release ==
Sinner is set to premiere as part of the Korean Cinema Today - Panorama section at the 31st Busan International Film Festival on October 7, 2026.
