= Long Long Night =

2026 South Korean animated film

- Promotional poster
- Hangul: 긴긴밤
- RR: Ginginbam
- MR: Kin'ginbam
- Directed by: Youm Kyu-bock
- Screenplay by: Youm Kyu-bock
- Based on: 긴긴밤 by Ruri
- Produced by: Kyoung Hee Jung; Dae Il Kang
- Starring: Bae Suzy; Park Ki-wook; Kim Gyu-na
- Narrated by: Bae Suzy
- Cinematography: Sung In Cho
- Edited by: Sun Hee Chu
- Music by: Hyun Joo Kim
- Animation by: Chung Shik Park
- Production companies: GOOGGOOG STUDIO; STUDIO EON; The Contents On
- Distributed by: Finecut Co. Ltd
- Release dates: September 12, 2026 (TIFF); October 8, 2026
- Running time: 99 minutes
- Country: South Korea
- Language: Korean

Long Long Night (Korean: 긴긴밤) is a 2026 South Korean 3D animated drama film directed by Youm Kyu-bock. Based on children's book of the same name by Ruri and narrated by Bae Suzy, the film chronicles the moving lives of a rhino and a penguin as they traverse a vast, ever-changing wilderness brimming with natural beauty and human-generated danger.

The film had its world premiere at the Centrepiece section of the 2026 Toronto International Film Festival on September 12, 2026.

== Synopsis ==
Norden, a white boulder rhinoceros, is raised by a herd of elephants after being separated from his own kind. As he grows older, he leaves the sanctuary and travels through the wilderness, and eventually finds other rhinoceroses, falls in love and becomes a father, but his family is destroyed by poaching. Later, Norden finds an abandoned penguin egg and protects it until it hatches. He and the young penguin form an unlikely bond and set out to find the ocean, facing predators, captivity and human poachers along the way.

== Voice cast ==
- Bae Suzy
- Park Ki-wook voice of Norden, white boulder rhino
- Kim Kyu-na voice of Penguin
- Um Sang-hyun
- So Jung-hwan
- Jeon Tae-yeol

== Release ==
Long Long Night had its world premiere at the Centrepiece section of the 2026 Toronto International Film Festival on September 12, 2026.

Subsequently it had its Korean Premiere in the Competition section of the 31st Busan International Film Festival on October 8, 2026 and vied for 'Busan Awards'. It was also screened in Anima't section on 17 October 2026 at the 59th Sitges Film Festival.

Finecut acquired the international sales rights of the film and presented it at European Film Market in February 2026. Japan based Geek Pictures acquired Japanese rights of the film in September 2026.

== Reception ==
=== Critical response ===
Christopher Llewellyn Reed of Film Festival Today rated the film 3.5 out of 5 stars. He praised the film's underlying message but felt that its emotional impact was sometimes weakened by excessive sentimentality, particularly in the musical score, though he found no major fault with the music apart from its overemphasis sometimes. Reed appreciated the film's message and concluded that its portrayal of sorrow reflected a bleak outlook on humanity's future.

=== Accolades ===
The film competed for various Vision Awards at Busan International Film Festival.

Award	Date of ceremony	Category	Recipient(s)	Result	Ref.
Busan International Film Festival	15 October 2026	Busan Awards: Best Film	Long Long Night	Nominated	
