= Selvi (2026 film) =

2026 Indian drama film

- Promotional poster
- Directed by: Sailesh Rathnakumar
- Screenplay by: Sailesh Rathnakumar; Bargav Sridhar
- Produced by: Anjali Patil
- Starring: Anjali Patil; Swathy Krishnan; Vinoth Kishan; Raja Krishnamoorty; Semmalar Annam; Archana Padmini; Mekha Rajan
- Cinematography: Bargav Sridhar
- Edited by: A. Sreekar Prasad
- Music by: Suren Vikhash
- Production company: Anahat Films
- Release date: 9 October 2026 (BIFF)
- Countries: India; Saudi Arabia
- Language: Tamil

Selvi is a 2026 Indian Tamil-language drama film co-written, and directed by Sailesh Rathnakumar. Starring Anjali Patil in titular role it follows a home-care nurse through the emotional and social realities of caregiving, duty, and survival.

It had its world premiere at the 31st Busan International Film Festival, in the Vision section on 9 October 2026.

== Premise ==
Selvi, a homecare nurse is taking care of her family's needs, her patients' care, and her dreams. But personal and professional problems push her to the edge.

== Cast ==
- Anjali Patil as Selvi
- Swathy Krishnan as Kavitha
- Vinoth Kishan as Purushothaman
- Raja Krishnamoorty as Vinod Kumar
- Semmalar Annam as Kamali
- Archana Padmini as Rincy
- Mekha Rajan as Anu Prabha

== Production ==
In March the project was selected at the 24th Hong Kong-Asia Film Financing Forum. It is co-produced by the Red Sea Fund, a Red Sea International Film Festival initiative, and supported by Hong Kong Asia Film Financing.

== Release ==
Selvi had its world premiere at the 31st Busan International Film Festival in the Vision – Asia section on 9 October 2026.

== Accolades ==
The film will compete for the Vision Awards at the 31st Busan International Film Festival.

Award	Date of ceremony	Category	Recipient(s)	Result	Ref.
Busan International Film Festival	15 October 2026	Vision Awards: Hylife Vision Award	Selvi	Won	
