= My Mother (2026 film) =

2026 Indonesian drama film

- Promotional poster
- Indonesian: IBUKU
- Directed by: Eddie Cahyono
- Screenplay by: Eddie Cahyono
- Produced by: Tika Bravani; Shin Yamaguchi
- Starring: Christine Hakim; Ayushita; Landung Simatupang
- Cinematography: Muhammad Firdaus
- Edited by: Greg Arya
- Music by: Krisna Purna
- Production companies: Talenta Media; Yasa Buana Film; Knockonwood
- Release date: October 8, 2026 (BIFF)
- Running time: 96 minutes
- Countries: Indonesia; Japan
- Language: Indonesian

My Mother (Indonesian: IBUKU, stylized in all uppercase) is a 2026 Indonesian drama film written and directed by Eddie Cahyono. The film depicts the struggles of a mother trying to reach her daughter in Saudi Arabia. It stars Christine Hakim, Ayushita, and Landung Simatupang.

The film had its world premiere and competed in the Competition section of the 31st Busan International Film Festival on 8 October 2026 for 'Busan Awards'.

== Synopsis ==
Sumiati used to be a well-known Kuda Lumping dancer when she was young, but now she is an elderly widow living alone. Her husband lost everything because of gambling and eventually took his own life, leaving her with his debts. To survive, Sumiati is forced to marry off her only daughter, Sri, hoping the marriage will help repay what her husband owed. But Sri's husband turns out to be violent and constantly drunk. Unable to protect her daughter, Sumiati watches Sri run away to Saudi Arabia to work as a migrant labourer. There, Sri is abused by her employer, and in a moment of desperation she kills him. She is arrested and sentenced to death. When Sumiati finally hears about her daughter's terrible fate, she decides, despite everyone's cold reactions and objections, to travel and see Sri herself, driven by a mother's last hope and courage.

== Cast ==
- Christine Hakim as Sumiati
- Ayushita as Sri
- Landung Simatupang as village chief Djatmiko

== Production ==
The film project won the Arte International Prize of €6,000 at the 2015 Asian Project Market run with 2015 Busan International Film Festival from 4 to 6 October. It also offered the opportunity to meet international leading film industry professionals.

In November 2025, the work-in-progress project was selected at the JAFF Future Project, where the production team seeks crucial industry partnerships. It was run along with 20th Jogja-NETPAC Asian Film Festival in Yogyakarta, Indonesia.

== Release ==
My Mother had its World Premiere in the Competition section of the 31st Busan International Film Festival on 8 October 2026 and vied for 'Busan Awards'.

Asian Shadows acquired the International sales rights of the film before Busan premiere.

== Accolades ==
The film competed for various Vision Awards at Busan International Film Festival.

Award	Date of ceremony	Category	Recipient(s)	Result	Ref.
Busan International Film Festival	15 October 2026	Busan Awards: Special Jury Award	My Mother	Won	
