= Unmasked (TV series) =

2025 South Korean television series

- Promotional poster
- Hangul: 트리거
- Lit.: Trigger
- RR: Teurigeo
- MR: T'ŭrigŏ
- Genre: Workplace comedy; Crime thriller
- Written by: Kim Gi-ryang
- Directed by: Yoo Sun-dong
- Starring: Kim Hye-soo; Jung Sung-il; Joo Jong-hyuk
- Music by: Primary
- Country of origin: South Korea
- Original language: Korean
- No. of episodes: 12

Production
- Executive producers: Jo Ji-hoon; Park Seong-hye; Kim Moo-ryung
- Production companies: KeyEast; Ordinary Gem; Banzakbanzak Film Production

Original release
- Network: Disney+
- Release: January 15 – February 19, 2025

Unmasked (Korean: 트리거) is a 2025 South Korean workplace comedy crime thriller television series written by Kim Gi-ryang, directed by Yoo Sun-dong, and starring Kim Hye-soo, Jung Sung-il, and Joo Jong-hyuk. Set in modern-day Seoul, the series follows a team of investigative journalists racing against the clock to save their careers. It was released on Disney+ from January 15, to February 19, 2025.

== Synopsis ==
A group of investigative journalists are in danger of losing their jobs after releasing a highly contentious report that enraged sponsors. Solving a 20-year-old cold case involving the enigmatic disappearance of a well-known actor is the team's last chance to salvage their careers. The group is pushed to the limit and forced to face the moral conundrums of their line of work as they pursue the investigation further and discover a web of secrets and conspiracies.

== Cast and characters ==
- Kim Hye-soo as Oh So-ryong

A passionate team leader PD of Trigger program that fiercely pursues cases and accidents that even the prosecution and the police cannot solve.

- Jung Sung-il as Han Do

A rookie PD with zero social skills.

- Joo Jong-hyuk as Kang Gi-ho

The youngest PD on the Trigger team.

== Production ==
=== Development ===
Yoo Sun-dong PD took the megaphone right after finishing the filming for The Uncanny Counter 2: Counter Punch (2023). KeyEast signed a production supply contract with The Walt Disney Company Korea.

=== Casting ===
Kim Hye-soo and Jung Sung-il were cast in June and November 2023, respectively. Kim and Jung along with Joo Jong-hyuk were confirmed to appear after Disney+ released the actors' still cuts in February 2024.

=== Filming ===
Principal photography began in January 2024.

== Release ==
Disney+ announced that Unmasked was one of the five Korean originals slated to be released in 2024. The series was supposed to be released in the second half of 2024, but due to lineup changes it was moved to 2025. It was confirmed to premiere on January 15, 2025.
