= Gu Xiaogang =

Chinese film director (born 1988)

- Gu at the 31st Busan International Film Festival in 2026
- Born: August 11, 1988 (age 38); Fuyang, China
- Occupations: Film director; Screenwriter
- Years active: 2010–present

Gu Xiaogang (Chinese: 顾晓刚; pinyin: Gù Xiǎogāng, sometimes Gu You; born August 11, 1988, in Fuyang) is a Chinese film director. He is best known for his feature films Dwelling in the Fuchun Mountains (2019), Dwelling by the West Lake (2023) and The First Taste of Loneliness (2026).

== Career ==
Gu's first feature film, Dwelling in the Fuchun Mountains, closed the 58th edition of the Critics' Week at the 2019 Cannes Film Festival. During the filming, he discovered that a family member had fallen victim to a fraudulent pyramid scheme, which became the catalyst for his second film, Dwelling by the West Lake. In 2023, Dwelling by the West Lake was shortlisted for the Akira Kurosawa Award at the 36th Tokyo International Film Festival. In 2024, his feature Spring Comes Along was the main promotional film at the 14th Beijing International Film Festival.

== Filmography ==
Year	English title	Original title	Notes
2019	Dwelling in the Fuchun Mountains	春江水暖	
2023	Dwelling by the West Lake	草木人间	
2026	The First Taste of Loneliness	初次尝到寂寞	
