= Dwelling in the Fuchun Mountains (film) =

- Chinese: 春江水暖
- Directed by: Gu Xiaogang
- Release date: 22 May 2019 (Cannes)
- Running time: 150 minutes
- Country: China
- Languages: Fuyang dialect; Mandarin Chinese

Dwelling in the Fuchun Mountains (Chinese: 春江水暖; pinyin: Chūnjiāng Shuǐnuǎn) is a 2019 drama film directed by Gu Xiaogang. The English title of the film is borrowed from a painting by Huang Gongwang.

== Reception ==
On the review aggregator website Rotten Tomatoes, 100% of 9 critics' reviews are positive, with an average rating of 9.5/10.
