= Marc Fitoussi =

French film director and screenwriter

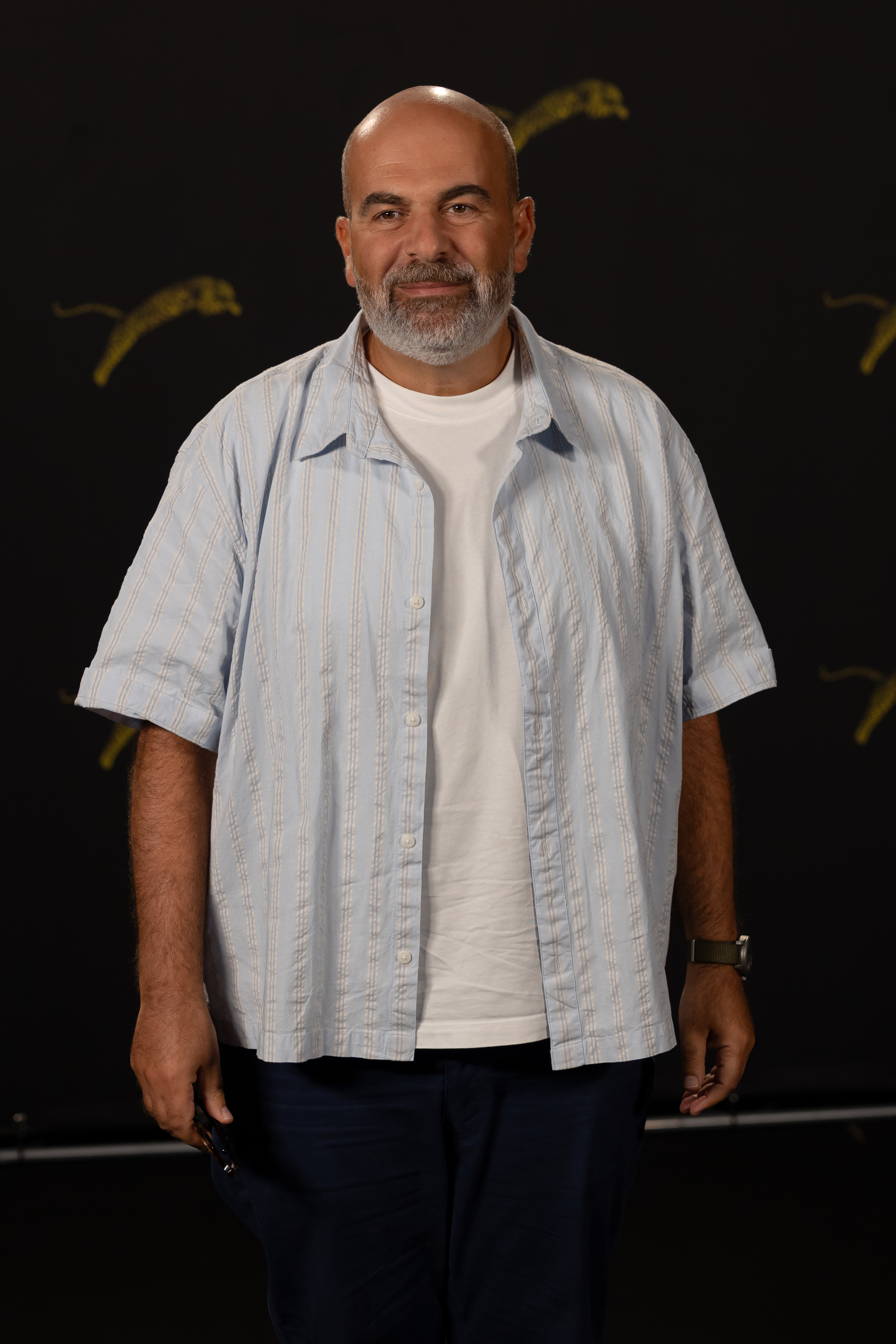
- Marc Fitoussi in 2026
- Born: 20 July 1976 (age 50)
- Occupations: Film director, screenwriter
- Years active: 1998–present

Marc Fitoussi (born 20 July 1976) is a French film director and screenwriter.

== Life and career ==
After a university degree course in English and art history, Fitoussi joined the Conservatoire européen d'écriture audiovisuelle (CEEA) (European Conservatory for screen writing). It was there that he developed his screenwriting trade. He began also a parallel career as film director, making several short features including Illustre Inconnue and Bonbon au poivre which earned him a nomination for César Award for Best Short Film in 2007. The same year, he directed his first long film La Vie d'artiste, with Sandrine Kiberlain, Denis Podalydès and Émilie Dequenne in the lead rôles. This film won the Prix Michel-d'Ornano for the best work of French fiction at the Deauville American Film Festival. In 2010, his second long film was released, Copacabana, whose action takes place in the Belgian town of Ostend, starring Isabelle Huppert and her daughter Lolita Chammah in the lead parts as mother and daughter.

== Filmography ==
=== Cinema ===
Screenwriter and director

- 1999 : Ma vie active, co-directed with Elsa Barrère (short)
- 2002 : Sachez chasser, co-directed with Elsa Barrère (medium)
- 2004 : Illustre Inconnue (short)
- 2005 : Bonbon au poivre (medium)
- 2007 : La Vie d'artiste
- 2010 : Copacabana
- 2012 : Pauline détective
- 2014 : Paris Follies
- 2016 : Trainee Day
- 2020 : Selfie
- 2022 : Two Tickets to Greece
- 2026 : All About Corinne

Scriptwriter

- 1998 : Les Fleurs de l'Algérien dir. Nader Takmil Homayoun (short)

=== Television ===
- 2006 : L'Éducation anglaise (documentary on French adolescents on a language exchange in England)
