= Jung Sung-il (actor) =

South Korean actor (born 1980)

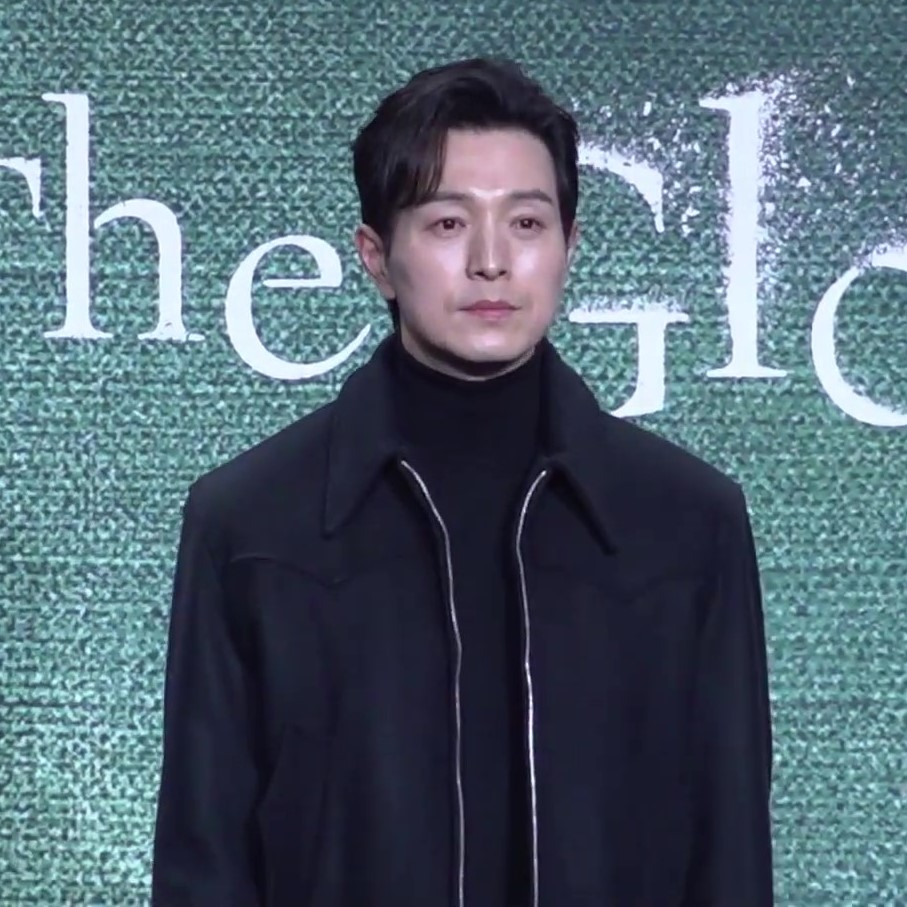
- Jung in December 2022
- Born: February 3, 1980 (age 46); Daegu, South Korea
- Occupation: Actor
- Years active: 2000–present
- Agent: Billions
- Spouse: Unknown (m. 2016; div. 2025)
- Children: 1

Korean name
- Hangul: 정성일
- RR: Jeong Seongil
- MR: Chŏng Sŏngil

Jung Sung-il (Korean: 정성일; born February 3, 1980) is a South Korean actor. He gained recognition for his appearance in the Netflix original series The Glory (2022–2023).

== Personal life ==
Jung married in 2016. On October 14, 2025, his agency announced that the couple had amicably divorced. The two have one son together.

== Filmography ==
Key
| † | Denotes films that have not yet been released |

=== Film ===
| Year | Title | Role | Ref. |
|---|---|---|---|
| 2008 | A Frozen Flower | Royal Guard | |
| 2013 | Rough Play | | |
| 2014 | The Con Artists | | |
| 2017 | The Chase | young Pyung-dal | |
| 2022 | Take Care of My Mom | | |
| 2022 | Project Wolf Hunting | Detective Jung Pil-sung | |
| 2024 | Uprising | Genshin | |
| 2025 | Omniscient Reader: The Prophecy | Cheon In-ho | |
| 2025 | Murderer Report | Young-hoon | |
| 2026 | Sinner † | Seok-gyu | |

=== Television ===
| Year | Title | Role | Ref. |
|---|---|---|---|
| 2009 | The Return of Iljimae | Kotaro | |
| 2019 | Different Dreams | Jin-soo | |
| 2019 | Woman of 9.9 Billion | Baek Seung-jae | |
| 2020 | Stranger Season 2 | Park Sang-mu | |
| 2020 | Birthcare Center | Lee Seon-woo | |
| 2021 | Times | Kang Sin-wook | |
| 2021–2022 | Bad and Crazy | Shin Ju-hyeok | |
| 2021–2022 | Moonshine | King Lee Kang | |
| 2022 | Our Blues | Kim Tae-hoon | |
| 2022–2023 | The Glory | Ha Do-yeong | |
| 2024 | Begins ≠ Youth | Kim Chang-jun han | |
| 2024 | Unmasked | Han Don | |

== Theater ==
| Year | Title | Role | Ref. |
|---|---|---|---|
| 2000 | A Praise of Youth | | |
| 2007 | Fool of The River | a constant | |
| 2008 | Happy Tears | | |
| 2010 | Liar Part 1 | John Smith | |
| 2011 | Not in Nanjoong Diary | Sasuke | |
| 2011 | Fantasy Couple | Billy Park | |
| 2013 | Dramatic Night | Han Jeong-hoon | |
| 2015 | I would like to see | Dok-hee | |
| 2015 | Sheer Madness | Oh Jun-su | |
| 2016 | Brother's Night | | |
| 2017 | Jamaica Health Club | Hwanggangbong | |
| 2018–2019 | Get off Work at 6 | Noh Joo-yeon | |
| 2019 | Unchain | Mark | |
| 2019 | Everybody Wants Him Dead | Producer | |
| 2019 | Turn Back and Leave | Sang-sang | |
| 2020 | Unchain | Mark | |
| 2020 | Nanseol | Yi Dal | |
| 2020–2022 | Mio Fratello | Sunny Boy | |
| 2023 | Beautiful Sunday | Oh Jung-jin | |
| 2023 | Interview | Eugene Kim | |

== Awards and nominations ==
| Award | Year | Category | Nominee / Work | Result | Ref. |
|---|---|---|---|---|---|
| Baeksang Arts Awards | 2025 | Best New Actor – Film | Uprising | Won | |
| Blue Dragon Film Awards | 2025 | Best New Actor | Uprising | Nominated | |
| Chunsa Film Art Awards | 2025 | Best New Actor | Uprising | Won | |
| Global OTT Awards | 2026 | Best Supporting Actor | Made in Korea | Won | |
