= All About Corinne =

2026 French comedy film

- Film poster
- French: Ni vue, ni connue
- Directed by: Marc Fitoussi
- Written by: Marc Fitousso
- Produced by: Caroline Bonmarchand
- Starring: Isabelle Huppert; Sandrine Kiberlain
- Cinematography: Jérôme Alméras
- Edited by: Jérôme Alméras
- Music by: Bertrand Burgalat
- Production companies: Avenue B Productions; Beside Productions; Egérie Productions; Les Films du Camélia
- Distributed by: Memento
- Release dates: 15 August 2026 (Locarno); 7 October 2026 (France)
- Running time: 115 minutes
- Country: France
- Language: French

All About Corinne (French: Ni vue, ni connue, lit. "Neither Seen Nor Known") is a French comedy film, directed by Marc Fitoussi and released in 2026. The film stars Isabelle Huppert as Corinne Maclou, a background actress who aspires to break through to starring roles, and befriends actress Sandrine Kiberlain in the hopes of achieving her dream.

The cast also includes Diane Kruger, Emmanuelle Bercot, Anne Marivin, Ana Girardot, Vincent Dedienne and Thomas Jolly, most of whom are playing fictionalized versions of themselves.

== Release ==
The film premiered on 15 August in the Piazza Grande competition at the 79th Locarno Film Festival, followed by a gala screening at the 2026 Toronto International Film Festival.

It has also been announced as the opening film of the 2026 Festival International du Film Francophone de Namur.

Distributed by Memento, it was released theatrically in France on 7 October 2026.

The film was purchased by Cohen Media Group for release in the United States, with a date to be announced.

== Reception ==
Award	Date of ceremony	Category	Recipient(s)	Result	Ref.
Toronto International Film Festival	September 13, 2026	TIFF Tribute Performer Award	Isabelle Huppert	Honored	
